= 1924 in Nordic music =

The following is a list of notable events and compositions of the year 1924 in Nordic music.

== Events ==
- 24 March – Jean Sibelius conducts the world premiere of his 7th and last symphony as Fantasia sinfonica No. 1 in Stockholm.
- unknown date – Spanish-born Olallo Morales joins the programme committee of Swedish Public Radio and also temporarily replaces Hugo Alfvén as director of music at Uppsala University.

== New works ==
- Hugo Alfvén – Kantat vid Världspostunionens halvsekels jubileum 1924
- Sigvaldi Kaldalóns – Klukknahljóð
- Ture Rangström – Vinden och trädet
- Hilding Rosenberg – Violin concerto no. 1, op. 22

== Popular music ==
- Carl Nielsen – "Der er et yndigt land" (Nielsen's setting of the Danish national anthem, to lyrics by Adam Oehlenschläger)
- Evert Taube – "Sjuttonde balladen"

== Births ==
- 26 January – Alice Babs, Swedish popular singer (died 2014)
- 6 June – Gunnar Brunvoll, Norwegian impresario and opera administrator (died 1999)
- 23 August – Edvard Fliflet Bræin, Norwegian conductor and composer (died 1976)
- 10 September – Putte Wickman, Swedish jazz clarinetist (died 2006)
- 18 October – Egil Hovland, Norwegian composer (died 2013)
- 7 December – Bent Fabric, Danish pianist and composer (died 2020)
- 20 December – Arne Domnérus, Swedish jazz saxophonist and clarinetist (died 2008)

== Deaths ==
- 17 February – Oskar Merikanto, Finnish pianist, conductor and composer (born 1868)
- 27 February – Carolina Östberg, Swedish opera singer and teacher (born 1853)
- 12 April – Sjur Helgeland, Norwegian hardingfele fiddler and composer (born 1858)
- 13 September – P. J. Hannikainen, Finnish composer (born 1854)
- 2 December – Emmy Achté, Finnish operatic mezzo-soprano (born 1850)
- 7 December – Rudolph Sophus Bergh, Danish composer (born 1859)

== See also ==
- 1924 in Denmark
- 1924 in Iceland
- 1924 in Norwegian music
- 1924 in Sweden
