= 1968 in Nordic music =

The following is a list of notable events and releases that happened in Scandinavian music in 1968.

== Events ==
- 8 February – Rued Langgaard's Violin Concerto, originally written in 1943-44) is premiered on Danish radio, with Kai Laursen as soloist and the Odense Symphony Orchestra.
- 6 April – The 13th Eurovision Song Contest is held in London, UK, and is won by Spain. Of the three competing Scandinavian countries, Sweden finish in 5th place, Norway 13th and Finland 16th.

== New works ==
- Carl-Olof Anderberg – The Emigrant from Brisbane
- Bo Nilsson – Attraktionen, for string quartet
- Per Nørgård
  - Rejse ind i den gyldne skærm (Voyage into the Golden Screen)
  - Concerto for Accordion, "Recall"
- Einojuhani Rautavaara – Cello Concerto No.1

== Popular music ==
- Rauno Lehtinen – "Muistan kesän", performed by Kai Hyttinen
- Peter Himmelstrand – "Det börjar verka kärlek, banne mig", performed by Claes-Göran Hederström (#1 Sweden;)

== Hit albums ==
- Hep Stars – It's Been a Long Long Time

== Recordings ==
- Egil Kapstad Choir & Orchestra – Syner (Norsk Jazzforum)
- Various artists – Perspectives '68

== Film and television music ==
- Björn Ulvaeus and Benny Andersson – The Seduction of Inga
- Sven Gyldmark – Min søsters børn vælter byen

== Musical films ==
- Under ditt parasoll, featuring the Sven-Ingvars orchestra

== Births ==
- 22 March – Øystein Aarseth, Norwegian black metal guitarist and music producer (died 1993)
- 30 March – Jon Øivind Ness, Norwegian composer
- 7 April – Stein Torleif Bjella, Norwegian singer and songwriter

== Deaths ==
- 14 April – Bjarne Amdahl, Norwegian composer and orchestra conductor (born 1903)
- 14 June – Karl-Birger Blomdahl, Swedish composer (born 1916)
- 30 July – Jón Leifs, Icelandic composer, pianist, and conductor (lung cancer; born 1899)
- 17 September – Jolly Kramer-Johansen, composer (born 1902)
- 18 October – Eyvin Andersen, Danish organist and composer (born 1914)
- 29 October – Marius Ulfrstad, Norwegian conductor and composer (born 1890).
- 9 November – Jan Johansson, Swedish jazz pianist (car crash; born 1931)
- 23 November – Reinhold Svensson, Swedish jazz pianist, Hammond organist and composer (born 1919)
- 26 December – Inger Bang Lund, Norwegian pianist and composer (born 1876)

== See also ==
- 1968 in Denmark
- 1968 in Iceland
- 1969 in Norwegian music
- 1969 in Sweden
