= 1976 in Nordic music =

The following is a list of notable events and releases that happened in Scandinavian music in 1976.

== Events ==
- 28 February – At the 18th Annual Grammy Awards, a recording of Così fan tutte featuring Swedish tenor Nicolai Gedda wins the Grammy Award for Best Opera Recording.
- 4 March – ABBA arrive at Sydney airport for a promotional tour in Australia.
- 3 April – At the 21st Eurovision Song Contest, Finland is the best-performing Scandinavian country, finishing in 11th place. Norway, the only other competing Scandinavian country, finishes 18th.
- 18 June – ABBA perform "Dancing Queen" for the first time in Sweden at a gala concert in the Royal Swedish Opera, Stockholm, on the eve of the wedding of King Carl XVI Gustaf to Silvia Sommerlath.
- unknown date – Iceland's Atli Heimir Sveinsson is awarded the Nordic Music Prize.

== New works ==
- Einar Englund – Symphony No. 4, "Nostalgic" (in memory of Shostakovich)
- Per Nørgård
  - Frostsalme
  - Winter Cantata
- Ib Nørholm – Sonata No. 1, Op. 69, for guitar

== Hit singles ==
- ABBA
  - "Fernando" (No. 1 Australia, Austria, Belgium, Netherlands, Portugal, Switzerland, UK, etc)
  - "Money, Money, Money" (No. 1 Australia, Belgium, France, Netherlands, New Zealand, etc)
- Fredi and the Friends – "Pump-Pump"
- Harpo – "Horoscope" (No. 1 Denmark; No. 3 Germany)
- Chrisse Johansson – "R-A-K-A-S"
- Veikko Lavi – "Jokainen ihminen on laulun arvoinen"

== Hit albums ==
- ABBA – Arrival
- Megas – Fram Og Aftur Blindgötuna
- Thorleifs – Skänk mig dina tankar (No. 1 Sweden)

== Film and television music ==
- Julius Jacobsen – Hello Baby

== Musical films ==
- Christer Boustedt – Sven Klang's Combo

== Births ==
- 22 January – Sivert Høyem, Norwegian rock singer
- 22 March – Marita Sølberg, Norwegian opera singer
- 10 April – Jan Werner Danielsen, Norwegian singer (died 2006)
- 23 July – Øyvind Torvund, Norwegian composer
- 24 December – Sveinn Rúnar Sigurðsson, Icelandic musician

== Deaths ==
- 31 January – Evert Taube, Swedish composer and singer (born 1890)
- 20 February – Erling Kjellsby, Norwegian organist and composer (born 1901).
- 30 April – Edvard Fliflet Bræin, Norwegian composer and music conductor (born 1924).
- 2 May – Karin Juel, Swedish singer (born 1900)
- 12 May – Sverre Hagerup Bull, Norwegian composer (born 1892)
- 7 June – Leif Rustad, Norwegian cellist and radio pioneer (born 1903).
- 6 September – Berit Brænne, Norwegian actress, children's writer and songwriter (born 1918)
- 25 September – Gjermund Haugen, Norwegian fiddler (born 1914)

== See also ==
- 1976 in Denmark
- 1976 in Iceland
- 1976 in Norwegian music
- 1976 in Sweden
