= 1880 in Nordic music =

The following is a list of notable events that occurred in the year 1880 in Nordic music.

== Events ==
- September – Edvard Grieg becomes artistic director of the Bergen Philharmonic Orchestra.
- unknown date – Sextus Miskow first appears as a bass singer at the Danish Royal Theatre, playing Jacob in the opera Joseph (Josef og hans Brødre) by Étienne Méhul.

== New works ==
- Elfrida Andrée – Fem smärre tonbilder, Op. 7
- Niels Gade – Violin concerto in D minor
- Edvard Grieg – 2 Elegiac Melodies, Op.34
- Robert Kajanus – 7 Songs from Tannhäuser, Op. 3
- Ludwig Norman – Symphony No. 3 in D Minor, Op. 58
- Emil Sjögren – Kullervon surumarssi (Kullervo's Funeral March), Op. 3

== Births ==
- 29 April – Sigvart Høgh-Nilsen, Norwegian pianist and composer (died 1919)
- 8 June – Theodor Larsson, Swedish songwriter and comedian (died 1937)
- 14 July – Gustav Fonandern, Swedish architect and singer (died 1960)
- 21 October – Viking Eggeling, Swedish filmmaker, pioneer of visual music (died 1925)

== Deaths ==
- 14 February – Wilhelmina Enbom, Swedish opera singer, 75
- 9 May – Hermann Berens, German-born Swedish pianist and composer, 54
- 17 August – Ole Bull, Norwegian violinist and composer, 70
- 7 October – Fredrika Stenhammar, Swedish opera singer, 44
- 8 October – Magnus Brostrup Landstad, Norwegian clergyman, psalmist and poet, 78
- 8 November – Andreas Peter Berggreen, Danish organist and composer, 79
