= 1969 in Nordic music =

The following is a list of notable events and releases that happened in Scandinavian music in 1969.

== Events ==
- 1 March – At the 1969 Melodifestivalen, Anni-Frid Lyngstad finishes in second place with the song "Härlig är vår jord". During the event, she meets Benny Andersson, whom she would later marry and perform with in ABBA.
- 29 March – The 14th Eurovision Song Contest is held in Madrid, Spain, and is won jointly by four countries: France, Netherlands, Spain and UK. Of the three competing Scandinavian countries, Sweden finish in 9th place, Finland 12th and Norway 16th.

== New works ==
- Ulf Grahn – Cinq Preludes
- Vagn Holmboe – String Quartet no. 10, Op. 102
- Lars-Erik Larsson – Quattro Tempi — Divertimento for wind orchestra
- Einojuhani Rautavaara – Piano Concerto no 1
- Leif Thybo – Concerto for Violin and Orchestra

== Popular music ==
- Benny Andersson, Stig Anderson and Björn Ulvaeus – "Ljuva sextital", performed by Brita Borg (#2 Sweden)
- Jan Johansson – "Här kommer Pippi Långstrump", performed by Inger Nilsson
- Toivo Kärki & Juha Vainio – "Mä en muista mitään"
- Birthe Kjær – "Casatschok" (#1 Denmark)
- Tommy Körberg – "Judy min vän" (#1 Norway)

== Hit albums ==
- Jan Erik Vold & Jan Garbarek – Briskeby Blues (#2 Norway)
- Pugh Rogefeldts – Ja, dä ä dä

== Recordings ==
- Jan Garbarek Quartet – Esoteric Circle

== Film and television music ==
- Henrik Otto Donner and Kaj Chydenius – Ruusujen aika
- Thorstein Bergman – "Balladen om kråkguldet" (theme from Kråkguldet

== Musical films ==
- Midt i en jazztid, with music by Bent Fabricius-Bjerre

== Births ==
- 21 February – Bosson, Swedish singer-songwriter
- 13 March – Susanna Mälkki, Finnish cellist and orchestra conductor
- 8 August – Øyonn Groven Myhren, Norwegian folk musician
- 19 September – Jóhann Jóhannsson, composer (died 1969)
- 22 September – Tuomas Kantelinen, Finnish composer

== Deaths ==
- 24 January – Pauline Hall, Norwegian music critic and composer (born 1890)
- 11 April – Ludvig Irgens-Jensen, Norwegian composer (born 1894)
- 8 June – Aino Sibelius (née Järnefelt), Finnish memoirist (born 1871)
- 9 August – Reidar Bøe, Norwegian singer and composer (born 1921)
- 18 August – Laci Boldemann, Swedish composer (born 1921)
- 11 December – Jens Gunderssen, Norwegian pianist and music teacher (born 1912)
- 16 December – Leo Mathisen, Danish pianist, composer, arranger, singer, and bandleader (born 1906)
- 24 December – Mary Barratt Due, Norwegian pianist and music teacher (born 1888)

== See also ==
- 1969 in Denmark
- 1969 in Iceland
- 1969 in Norwegian music
- 1969 in Sweden
