= 1919 in Nordic music =

The following is a list of notable events and compositions of the year 1919 in Nordic music.

== Events ==
- February/March – Jean Sibelius resumes work on his Fifth Symphony, partly in tribute to his friend Axel Carpelan.
- 27 September – The re-founded Oslo Philharmonic Orchestra (Filharmonisk Selskaps Orkester) gives its first concert, with the Norwegian royal family in attendance. Johan Halvorsen, its main conductor, begins work on his Norwegian Rhapsodies.
- 24 November – The final revised version of Sibelius's Fifth Symphony is premièred by the Helsinki Philharmonic, conducted by the composer.

== New works ==
- Hugo Alfvén – Symphony No. 4 in C minor, Op. 39, "Från havsbandet"
- Natanael Berg – Violin concerto in E minor
- Hakon Børresen – Den Kongelige Gæst (The Royal Guest) (opera)
- Carl Nielsen – Aladdin (for theatre)
- Jean Sibelius – Symphony No. 5 in E-flat major, Op. 82 (final revised version)
- Wilhelm Stenhammar – Lodolezzi sjunger suite

== Popular music ==
- Evert Taube – "Fritiof Andersson"

== Births ==
- 15 February – Stephan Henrik Barratt-Due, Norwegian violinist and music teacher (died 1985).
- 11 August – Dan Fog, Danish music antiquarian and publisher (died 2000)
- 24 August – Niels Viggo Bentzon, Danish composer (died 2000)
- 8 September – Johan Kvandal, composer and music critic (died 1999)
- 16 September – Sven-Erik Bäck, composer (died 1994)
- 28 September – Fred Lange-Nielsen, Norwegian jazz musician and medical specialist (died 1989)
- 20 December – Reinhold Svensson, Swedish jazz pianist, organist and composer (died 1968)

== Deaths ==
- 27 February – Zulamith Wellander, Swedish operatic mezzo-soprano (born 1857)
- 11 March – Harald Fryklöf, Swedish composer and teacher (born 1882; pneumonia)
- 24 March – Axel Carpelan, Finnish nobleman, friend and supporter of Sibelius (born 1858)
- 7 July – Adèle Almati, German-born Swedish mezzo-soprano (born 1861)
- 10 September – Helena Munktell, Swedish composer (born 1852)
- 17 October – Sven August Körling, Swedish organist and composer (born 1842)

== See also ==
- 1919 in Denmark
- 1919 in Finland
- 1919 in Iceland
- 1919 in Norwegian music
- 1919 in Sweden
