= 1894 in Nordic music =

The following is a list of notable events that occurred in the year 1894 in Nordic music.

== Events ==
- 14 March – The première of Carl Nielsen's Symphony No. 1 takes place, with Johan Svendsen conducting the Chapel Royal Orchestra and Nielsen himself among the second violins. The concert is attended by King Christian IX of Denmark and his family.
- 14 March – The première of Wilhelm Stenhammar's Piano Concerto No. 1 takes place at the Svenska Teatern, Stockholm, with the composer as soloist.

== New works ==
- Agathe Backer-Grøndahl
  - Norske Folkeviser og Folkedanse, Op.33
  - Norwegian Folk Songs, Op.34
  - 3 Claverstykker, Op.35
- Edvard Grieg – Barnlige Sange (Children's Songs)
- Jean Sibelius – Spring Song (Kevätlaulu)

== Births ==
- 13 April – Ludvig Irgens-Jensen, Norwegian composer (died 1969)
- 14 July – Osvald Helmuth, Danish singer and actor (died 1966)

== Deaths ==
- 1 June – Sophie Dedekam, Norwegian composer and diarist (born 1820)
- 15 July – Amanda Röntgen-Maier, Swedish violinist and composer (born 1853; tuberculosis)

== See also ==
- 1894 in Denmark
- 1894 in Norwegian music
- 1894 in Sweden
