= 1939 in Nordic music =

The following is a list of notable events and compositions of the year 1939 in Nordic music.

== Events ==
- 1 January – Jean Sibelius conducts his orchestral version of Andante festivo in a live broadcast to the New York World's Fair.
- 17 June – The earliest surviving recording of the "Säkkijärven polkka", a folk song made popular by Finnish accordionist Viljo "Vili" Vesterinen is made at the German school in Helsinki, with former members of the Dallapé Orchestra.
- unknown date – Eric Bengtson ceases to conduct the Svensk Filmindustri orkestern and becomes principal conductor of the Gävle Symphony Orchestra.

== New works ==
- John Fernström – A Chinese Rhapsody
- Hilding Rosenberg – String Quartet No. 4

== Popular music ==
- Adolf Kristoffer Nielsen & Holger Sinding – "Fjellsangen"
- Nils "Jokern" Perne och Sven Paddock – "Vårat gäng"

== Film music ==
- Nathan Görling – Kalle på Spången
- Adolf Kristoffer Nielsen – Gjest Baardsen, starring Alfred Maurstad
- Jules Sylvain – Emilie Högquist

== Births ==
- 21 March – Christer Boustedt, Swedish saxophonist and actor (died 1986)
- 13 May – Kari Løvaas, Norwegian operatic soprano (died 2025)
- 22 June – Heikki Sarmanto, Finnish jazz pianist and composer
- 9 August
  - Odd Børre, Norwegian singer (died 2023)
  - Ove Stokstad, Norwegian saxophonist (died 2018)
- 18 August – Harald Heide-Steen Jr., Norwegian actor and singer (died 2008)

== Deaths ==
- 11 February – Gustav Fredrik Lange, Norwegian violinist, composer and music teacher (born 1861)
- 3 May – Jørgen Ditleff Bondesen, Danish composer and music theorist (born 1855)
- 10 May – Sigfús Einarsson, Icelandic organist and composer (born 1877)
- 4 June – Carl Cohn Haste, blind Danish pianist, organist and composer (born 1874)
- 3 August – August Enna, Danish composer (born 1859)
- 16 October – Ludolf Nielsen, Danish violinist, pianist, conductor and composer (born 1876)

== See also ==
- 1939 in Denmark
- 1939 in Iceland
- 1939 in Norwegian music
- 1939 in Sweden
