= 1882 in Nordic music =

The following is a list of notable events that occurred in the year 1882 in Nordic music.

== Events ==
- Autumn – Iver Holter takes over from Edvard Grieg as conductor of the Bergen Philharmonic Orchestra in Norway.
- unknown date
  - Martin Wegelius establishes the Helsingfors Musikinstitut, the forerunner of the Sibelius Academy.
  - Finnish composer Robert Kajanus founds the Helsinki Philharmonic Orchestra, Scandinavia's first permanent professional orchestra.
  - Norwegian cellist and composer Anton Jörgen Andersen becomes a member of the Royal Swedish Academy of Music (Kungliga Musikaliska Akademien).
  - Danish flautist and composer Joachim Andersen co-founds the Berlin Philharmonic with 53 other musicians.

== New works ==
- Niels Gade – Psyche
- Johan Svendsen – Polonaise
- Karl Valentin – "Erste Liebe" from Åtta sånger ur Fahrendes Volk (Eight songs from Fahrendes Volk), with words by Arthur Fitger, translated into Swedish by Gustaf Lagercrantz

== Births ==
- 11 February
  - Arne Bjørndal, Norwegian composer and painter (died 1965)
  - Paul von Klenau, Danish composer (died 1946)
- 14 June – Anna Karolina Larsson (Lena Larsson), Swedish traditional folk singer (died 1967)
- 17 July – Christian Leden, Norwegian ethno-musicologist and composer (died 1957).
- 14 September – Harald Fryklöf, Swedish composer and teacher (died 1919)
- 21 September – Alf Hurum, Norwegian composer and painter (died 1972).

== Deaths ==
- 22 October – Oscar Ahnfelt, Swedish composer of hymn-tunes, 69
- 29 December – Josabeth Sjöberg, Swedish painter, composer and music teacher, 70

== See also ==
- 1882 in Denmark
- 1882 in Norwegian music
- 1882 in Swedish music
