= Black Soul Choir =

Black Soul Choir may refer to:

- The Black Soul Choir, whose EP Cardinal was released on Init Records
- "Black Soul Choir", song by 16 Horsepower from Sackcloth 'n' Ashes, covered by DevilDriver on their album Beast
- Black Soul Choir (album), Wolves Like Us 2014
