= 1890 in Nordic music =

The following is a list of notable events that occurred in the year 1890 in Nordic music.

== Events ==
- February – Carl Nielsen obtains a scholarship worth 1800 Danish kroner.
- 23 April – Icelandic composer Sveinbjörn Sveinbjörnsson marries his Scottish wife, Eleanor.
- October – In Berlin, on his way to Vienna, Jean Sibelius meets two other young Scandinavian composers, Carl Nielsen and Armas Järnefelt.

== New works ==
- Edvard Grieg
  - Gammel norsk melodi med variasjoner
  - Klaverstykker etter egne sanger, hefte II
- Johan Halvorsen – Suite for Violin and Piano
- Carl Nielsen – String Quartet No. 2 in F minor
- Jean Sibelius – Piano Quintet in G minor
- Christian Sinding – Symphony No. 1 in D minor

== Popular music ==
- Johan Halmrast (lyrics) & Kristian Wendelborg (music) – "Å, salige stund uten like"

== Births ==
- 12 March – Evert Taube, Swedish composer and singer (died 1976)
- 4 April – Per Kvist, Norwegian entertainer and revue writer (died 1947)
- 5 August – Pauline Hall, Norwegian music critic and composer (died 1969).
- 8 September – Bjørn Talén, Norwegian operatic tenor (died 1945).
- 11 September – Marius Ulfrstad, composer, organist and music teacher (died 1968).
- 13 October – Gösta Nystroem, Swedish composer (died 1966)

== Deaths ==
- 7 January – Hans Matthison-Hansen, Danish organist and composer (born 1817)
- 21 December – Niels Gade, Danish conductor and composer (born 1817)

== See also ==
- 1890 in Denmark
- 1890 in Norwegian music
- 1890 in Sweden
