= 1911 in Nordic music =

The following is a list of notable events and compositions of the year 1911 in Nordic music.

== Events ==
- 3 April – Jean Sibelius conducts the world première of his Symphony No. 4, given by the Philharmonia Society in Helsinki.
- unknown date
  - Aino Ackté, Oskar Merikanto and others found the Kotimainen Ooppera, which later becomes the Finnish National Opera.
  - Armas Järnefelt becomes Chief Conductor of the Royal Court Orchestra in Stockholm.

== New works ==
- Hugo Alfvén – Nocturne for piano
- Sverre Jordan – Suite in the Old Style, Op 4
- Erkki Melartin – Walzer-miniaturen, Op. 49
- Carl Nielsen – Concerto for Violin and Orchestra
- Jean Sibelius – Symphony No. 4

== Popular music ==
- Oskar Merikanto – "Nälkämaan laulu", setting of a poem by Ilmari Kianto

== Births ==
- 1 January – Arne Hendriksen, Norwegian operatic tenor (died 1996).
- 5 February – Jussi Björling, Swedish tenor (died 1960)
- 1 April – Anne-Marie Ørbeck, Norwegian pianist and composer (died 1996)
- 21 April – Zilas Görling, Swedish jazz saxophonist (died 1960)
- 24 May – Egil Storbekken, Norwegian folk musician (died 2002)
- 2 July – Anja Ignatius, Finnish violinist and music teacher (died 1995)
- 19 September – Allan Pettersson, Swedish composer (died 1980)
- 24 November – Erik Bergman, Danish composer (died 2006)
- 17 December – Cissi Cleve, Norwegian opera singer and composer (died 1993).

== Deaths ==
- 15 January – Rosa Asmundsen, Norwegian actress and singer (born 1846)
- 28 January – Wilhelmina Fundin, Swedish operatic soprano (born 1819)
- 14 June – Johan Svendsen, Norwegian violinist, conductor and composer (born 1840)
- 10 August – Carl Christian Lumbye, Danish composer, son of Hans Christian Lumbye
- 29 August – Hildegard Werner, Swedish musician, conductor and journalist (born 1834)

== See also ==
- 1911 in Denmark
- 1911 in Norwegian music
- 1911 in Sweden
