= Sigvaldi =

Sigvaldi is an Icelandic masculine given name. Notable people with the name include:

- Sigvaldi Guðjónsson (born 1994), Icelandic handball player
- Sigvaldi Kaldalóns (1881–1946), Icelandic composer and doctor
- Sigvaldi Strut-Haraldsson (10th century), Chieftain of the fabled Jomsvikings
