= 1931 in Nordic music =

The following is a list of notable events and compositions of the year 1931 in Nordic music.

== Events ==
- 13 January – Jussi Björling makes an early starring appearance as Jonatan in Carl Nielsen's opera Saul og David.
- 24 April – Carl Nielsen's last major work, Commotio, is privately premièred at Christiansborg Palace, Copenhagen.
- unknown date – Robert Kajanus takes a Finnish orchestra to London, where Jean Sibelius's First and Second Symphonies are recorded by EMI, to be issued by the "Sibelius Society".

== New works ==
- Hugo Alfvén – Swedish Rhapsody No. 3 (Dalarapsodien), for orchestra, op. 47
- Kurt Atterberg – Suite No. 8, for orchestra (Suite pastorale in modo antico), op. 34
- Vagn Holmboe
  - Allegro affettuoso, for piano
  - Allegro sostenuto, for violin and piano
  - Chamber Music No. 1, for chamber orchestra
  - Choral Pieces, for children's chorus
  - Concerto for chamber orchestra
  - Concerto, for solo piano
  - Duets, for two recorders
  - Provinsen [The Provinces], for soprano, alto, tenor, baritone, choir, flute, oboe, violin, and cello
  - Requiem, for children's voices, children's chorus, and chamber orchestra
- Edvin Kallstenius – Dalarapsodi (1st Swedish rhapsody)
- Sigvaldi Kaldalóns – "Á föstudaginn langa" (hymn)
- Yrjö Kilpinen – Piano Sonata No. 1, Op. 81, unpublished
- Uuno Klami
  - Hommage à Haendel, for orchestra
  - Scenes from a Puppet Theatre, for orchestra
  - Rag-Time and Blues, for two violins, clarinet, trumpet, and piano
  - Cheremis Fantasia, for cello and orchestra
- Lars-Erik Larsson – Duo, for violin and viola, op. 6
- Jón Leifs
  - Íslendingaljóð [Poems of Icelanders], for male choir, op. 15a
  - Íslenskir söngdansar [Icelandic Dance-Songs], for voices with ad lib instrumental accompaniment, op. 17a
  - Ný rímnadanslög [New Icelandic Dances], for piano, op. 14b
  - Preludes (Three), for organ, op. 16
  - Sjávarvísur [Ocean Verses], for male choir, op. 15b
- Carl Nielsen
  - Allegretto, in C major, for two recorders
  - Commotio, for organ, op. 50
  - "Kvadet om Nordens harpe", for TTBB choir
- Wilhelm Peterson-Berger
  - Danslek ur Ran [Dance Game from Ran], for choir a capella or choir and piano
  - Jämtlandssången [Song of Jämtland], for unison choir and piano
- Harald Sæverud – Variazioni piccole (50), for orchestra, op. 8
- Yngve Sköld – Alla Leggenda

== Popular music ==
- Carl Nielsen – "Det som lysner over vangen", for voice and piano
- Jules Sylvain – "Beate-Christine"

== Film music ==
- Kai Normann Andersen – Hotel Paradis
- Eric Bengtson – Röda dagen
- Einar Fagstad – Skepparkärlek
- Helge Lindberg – Kärlek och landstorm
- Ragnar Nordin – Flickan från Värmland
- Jules Sylvain – Dantes mysterier

== Births ==
- 26 January – Kaare Ørnung, Norwegian pianist, music teacher (died 2013)
- 20 February – Margareta Hallin, Swedish actress, opera singer and composer (died 2001)
- 4 March – Sonya Hedenbratt, Swedish jazz singer (died 2001)
- 9 March – Thore Skogman, Swedish popular singer (died 2007)
- 20 June – Arne Nordheim, Norwegian composer (died 2010)
- 31 August – Brita Koivunen, Finnish schlager singer (died 2014)
- 16 September – Jan Johansson, Swedish jazz pianist (died 1968)
- 16 September – Ferry Graf, Austrian singer who held Finnish citizenship (died 2017)

== Deaths ==
- 20 January – Margrethe Munthe, Norwegian teacher, children's writer, songwriter, and playwright (born 1860)
- 3 May – Otto Winter-Hjelm, Norwegian musician, conductor, writer, composer, and music critic (born 1837)
- 18 August – Johan Fridolf Hagfors, Finnish music critic and composer (born 1857)
- 3 October – Carl Nielsen, composer (born 1865)

== See also ==
- 1931 in Denmark
- 1931 in Iceland
- 1931 in Norwegian music
- 1931 in Sweden
