= Viderø =

Viderø is a surname. Notable people with the surname include:

- Finn Viderø (1906–1987), Danish organist
- Kristian Osvald Viderø (1906–1991), Faroese clergyman,
