= Jørgen Ditleff Bondesen =

Danish composer and music theorist (1855–1939)

- Born: 7 April 1855
- Died: 3 May 1939 (aged 84)
- Education: The Royal Danish Academy of Music
- Occupation: Composer
- Known for: Founded Aarhus Academy of Music

Jørgen Ditleff Bondesen (7 April 1855 – 3 May 1939) was a Danish composer and music theorist.

He was a student at The Royal Danish Academy of Music 1873–1875 under E. Neupert, V. Tofte G. Matthison-Hansen, J.P.E. Hartmann and Niels W. Gade. From 1876–1886, he was assistant organist in Holmen Church. From 1883–1901 he worked as a teacher at the conservatory in piano and theory. Among his students were the pianists Johanne Stockmarr, Frederick Schnedler-Pedersen George Høeberg, organist Camillo Carlsen, and the composers Ludolf Nielsen and Siegfried Salomon.

In 1901 Bondesen moved to Aarhus, where he founded Aarhus Academy of Music, which he led from 1902 to 1926. Both times in Copenhagen and later he wrote numerous music theory books, used much today. Moreover, he cooperated with the Angul Hammerich for his book Music Kjoebenhavns 1867-92 from 1892.

As a composer Bondesen published song music (romantic and spiritual songs and choir music). His works are as follows:

== Works ==
- Richters Harmonilære (1883)
- Lobes Musikens Katechismus (1885)
- Orchesterinstrumenterne og deres Omfang samt Plads i Partituret (1885)
- Harmonilære (1897)
- Kjøbenhavns Musikkonservatorium 1892–97
- Opgaver til Harmonilæren (1897)
- Læren om Contrapunkt (1902)
- Kortfattet Haandbog i Harmonilære (1920)
- Nye Opgaver til Harmonilæren (1923)
- Fortegnelse over Niels W. Gades Compositioner
