= 1925 in Nordic music =

The following is a list of notable events and compositions of the year 1925 in Nordic music.

== Events ==
- 1 January – On the first day of radio broadcasting in Sweden, Gaston Borch conducts the Skandia Cinema Orchestra in a broadcast of orchestral music.
- 14 September – Jacob Gade introduces his new work, "Jalousie", as the score to the silent film Don Q, Son of Zorro, himself conducting the orchestra of the Palads Cinema in Copenhagen.
- 5 December – Carl Nielsen's final symphony, Symphony No. 6, the Sinfonia semplice, is completed, six days before its première in Copenhagen. Despite suffering from heart problems, the composer conducts the first performance himself.

== New works ==
- John Fernström – String Quartet No. 1
- Jean Sibelius
  - Everyman Suite
  - The Tempest (incidental music)

== Popular music ==
- Jacob Gade – "Jalousie"
- Gustaf Wennerberg – "En borde inte sova/Man borde inte sova"

== Film music ==
- Helmer Alexandersson – Ingmarsarvet

== Births ==
- 20 February – Hans-Jørgen Holman, musicologist and educationalist (died 1986)
- 11 July – Nicolai Gedda, Swedish operatic tenor (died 2017)

== Deaths ==
- 2 February
  - Gustaf Hägg, Swedish organist and composer (born 1867)
  - Emmy Köhler, Swedish hymn-writer (born 1867)
- 18 February – August Schønemann, Norwegian singer, actor and comedian (born 1891)
- 11 March – Andreas Hallén, Swedish conductor and composer (born 1846)
- 19 May – Viking Eggeling, Swedish filmmaker, pioneer of visual music (born 1880)
- 5 July – Hjalmar Borgstrøm, Norwegian composer and music critic (born 1864)
- 19 October – Richard Henneberg, German-born Swedish composer (born 1853)
- 26 November – Johannes Haarklou, Norwegian composer, organist, conductor, and music critic (born 1847)

== See also ==
- 1925 in Denmark
- 1925 in Iceland
- 1925 in Norwegian music
- 1925 in Sweden
