= 1993 in Nordic music =

The following is a list of notable events and releases that happened in Nordic music in 1993.

== Events ==
- 10 April On the first day of Norway's 20th Vossajazz festival, Ole Hamre is awarded the festival prize.
- 15 May – At the 38th Eurovision Song Contest, Norway is the best-performing of the Scandinavian countries, finishing in 5th place. Sweden finishes seventh, Iceland 13th, Finland 17th and Denmark 22nd.
- August – Norwegian heavy metal musician Varg Vikernes is arrested and charged with the murder of another musician, Euronymous.
- unknown date – Finnish metal group Children of Bodom is founded by guitarist Alexi Laiho and drummer Jaska Raatikainen, under the name "Inearthed".

== Classical works ==
- Ulf Grahn – as time passes by
- Oliver Kentish – Mitt Folk
- Niels Marthinsen – Panorama for Orchestra

== Film and TV scores ==
- Kjetil Bjerkestrand – Hodet over vannet
- Bengt Palmers – Drömkåken

== Hit singles ==
- Ace of Base
  - "Happy Nation" (#1 Denmark, Finland, France; #4 Sweden)
  - "The Sign" (#1 Australia, Denmark, Germany, Spain, US)
- A-ha – "Dark Is the Night for All" (#4 Norway)
- Björk – "Play Dead" (#1 Iceland; #7 Sweden; #10 Norway)
- Cut 'N' Move – "Give It Up" (#1 Denmark, Australia; #2 Norway)
- Flexx – "Wake Up" (#4, Sweden)
- Klamydia – "Lahja" (#1 Finland)
- Kolmas Nainen – "Onpa kadulla mittaa!" (#1 Finland)
- Leif "Loket" Olsson – "Vart tog tomten vägen?"
- Rob'n'Raz – "In Command" (#1 Sweden; #4 Finland)
- Roxette – "Almost Unreal" (#7 Denmark, UK; #9 Iceland)

== Eurovision Song Contest ==
- Denmark in the Eurovision Song Contest 1993
- Finland in the Eurovision Song Contest 1993
- Iceland in the Eurovision Song Contest 1993
- Norway in the Eurovision Song Contest 1993
- Sweden in the Eurovision Song Contest 1993

== Births ==
- 28 February – Emmelie de Forest, Danish singer
- 21 October – Käärijä, Finnish singer and rapper

== Deaths ==
- 25 January – Irma Björck, Swedish operatic mezzo-soprano (born 1898)
- 4 June – Erna Tauro, Swedish-Finnish pianist and composer (born 1916)
- 10 August – Øystein Aarseth, aka Euronymous, black metal guitarist of Mayhem fame (born 1968; murdered)
- 1 September – Eugen Malmstén, Finnish musician, singer, conductor and composer (born 1909)
- 6 September – Bjarne Liller, Danish singer-songwriter (born 1935)
- 23 October – Ulf Björlin, Swedish conductor and composer (born 1933)
- 18 November – Arvid Fladmoe, Norwegian composer and conductor (born 1915)
- 27 December – Cissi Cleve, Norwegian opera singer and composer (born 1911)
