= Marthinsen =

Marthinsen is a surname. Notable people with the surname include:

- Finn Kristian Marthinsen (born 1946), Norwegian politician
- Jim Marthinsen (born 1956), Norwegian ice hockey player
- Karl Marthinsen (1896–1945), Norwegian Army commander
- Mariann Marthinsen (born 1984), Norwegian cross-country skier and swimmer
- Marianne Marthinsen (born 1980), Norwegian politician
- Niels Marthinsen (born 1963), Danish composer
- Ole Marthinsen (1928–2003), Norwegian bandy player
