= 2008 in Nordic music =

The following is a list of notable events and releases that happened in Nordic music in 2008.

== Events ==
- 1 January – Making her début as a concert pianist, German violinist Julia Fischer chooses Edvard Grieg's Piano Concerto in A minor at the Alte Oper, Frankfurt, Germany.
- 14 March – Norwegian guitarist Mads Berven is awarded the Vossajazzprisen 2008 at the Vossajazz festival.
- 20 May – On finally leaving Viking metal band Stratovarius after 20 years, Norwegian lead vocalist and band founder Timo Tolkki agrees to sign over his right to use the band's name, giving other members the option to continue without him.
- 11 September – Christian Älvestam leaves the band Scar Symmetry and begins a solo career.
- 18 September – Peter Wichers returns to Swedish band Soilwork, replacing Daniel Antonsson.
- 7 October – The Spotify on-demand music streaming service is launched in Sweden, where it was founded two years earlier.
- 9 October – Singer Denny Axelsson leaves Swedish band The Blinded.
- November – Norwegian black metal vocalist Gaahl reveals that he is gay, in an interview with the magazine Rock Hard.
- unknown date – Stefan Klaverdal wins first prize at the International Competition for Electroacoustic Music in Bourges, for his score for the film SIDA 33.

== Classical works ==
- Kalevi Aho –Minea. Concertante Music for Orchestra
- Bo Holten – The Visit of the Royal Physician (opera), published

== Albums released ==
=== January ===
Day	Artist	Album	Label	Notes	Ref.
2	In Mourning	Shrouded Divine	Aftermath Music	Debut album	
14	The Dø	A Mouthful	Cinq 7	Debut album	
30	Lykke Li	Youth Novels	LL Recordings	Produced by Björn Yttling	

=== February ===
Day	Artist	Album	Label	Notes	Ref.
8	Behexen	My Soul for His Glory	Hammer of Hate Records	Limited edition	
13	Norther	N	Century Media Records	Last Norther album with Petri Lindroos	

=== March ===
Day	Artist	Album	Label	Notes	Ref.
10	Bloodbath	Unblessing the Purity	Peaceville Records	First album with Mikael Åkerfeldt on vocals since 2002	
10	Nortt	Galgenfrist	Avantgarde Music	Recorded 2006-7	
21	Korpiklaani	Korven Kuningas	Nuclear Blast Records	First album with Nuclear Blast	

=== April ===
Day	Artist	Album	Label	Notes	Ref.
15	Ketil Bjørnstad	Life in Leipzig	ECM Records	Recorded in 2005; featuring Terje Rypdal	

=== May ===
Day	Artist	Album	Label	Notes	Ref.
20	Broder Daniel	Cruel Town	EMI Distribution	Re-release of last studio album before disbanding	
21	Bang Gang	Ghosts from the Past	Cool Music		
30	Communic	Payment of Existence			
30	Opeth	Watershed			
30	Pyramaze	Immortal	Locomotive Music	Last album with Matt Barlow as vocalist	
30	Sabaton	The Art of War	Black Lodge Records	Based on The Art of War by Sun Tzu	

=== June ===
Day	Artist	Album	Label	Notes	Ref.
2	Bloodbath	The Wacken Carnage	Peaceville records	Live album	
2	Satyricon	My Skin Is Cold	Roadrunner Records	EP	
10	Unleashed	Hammer Battalion	Steamhammer		

=== July ===
Day	Artist	Album	Label	Notes	Ref.
14	Basshunter	Now You're Gone – The Album	Hard2Beat, Warner Music Sweden, Ultra Records	First English-language album	

=== August ===
Day	Artist	Album	Label	Notes	Ref.
8	Nina Kreutzmann Jørgensen	Eqqissineq	Atlantic Music	First solo album	
13	Machinae Supremacy	Overworld	Spinefarm Records		

=== September ===
Day	Artist	Album	Label	Notes	Ref.
1	Volbeat	Guitar Gangsters & Cadillac Blood	Mascot Records, Rebel Monster	#1 in Danish and Finnish album charts	
17	Swallow the Sun	Plague of Butterflies	Spinefarm	EP	
22	Omnium Gatherum	The Redshift	Candlelight Records	Produced by Dan Swanö	

=== October ===
Day	Artist	Album	Label	Notes	Ref.
20	Darkthrone	Dark Thrones and Black Flags	Peaceville Records		
24	Darkane	Demonic Art	Nuclear Blast, Massacre Records		
24	Lordi	Deadache	The End Records		

=== November ===
Day	Artist	Album	Label	Notes	Ref.
3	Satyricon	The Age of Nero	Roadrunner Records		
3	Turisas	A Finnish Summer with Turisas	Century Media	DVD (documentary film)	
13	Dag Arnesen Trio	Norwegian Song 2	Resonant Music		

=== Unknown date ===
Day	Artist	Album	Label	Notes	Ref.
	Anne Linnet	Anne Linnet	Sony BMG		

== Deaths ==
- 10 February – Inga Nielsen, Danish operatic soprano (born 1946; cancer)
- 15 March – Fredrik Friis, Norwegian composer, singer, and lyricist (born 1923)
- 16 March – Ola Brunkert, Swedish drummer, session drummer for ABBA (born 1946; accidental fall)
- 19 March – Eivind Solberg, Norwegian jazz trumpeter (born 1933)
- 30 March – Anders Göthberg, Swedish guitarist (born 1975)
- 3 July – Harald Heide-Steen Jr., Norwegian actor and singer (born 1939)
- 18 July – Tauno Marttinen, Finnish composer (born 1912)
- 25 August – Pehr Henrik Nordgren, Finnish composer (born 1944; cancer)
- 6 October – Paavo Haavikko, Finnish poet and librettist (born 1931)
- 26 November – Pekka Pohjola, Finnish multi-instrumentalist and composer (born 1952; epileptic seizure)
