= 1916 in Nordic music =

The following is a list of notable events and compositions of the year 1916 in Nordic music.

== Events ==
- 1 February – Carl Nielsen conducts the première of his Symphony No. 4, the Inextinguishable, in Copenhagen.
- 5 November – A Finnish-language version of Hugo von Hofmannsthal's 1911 play Jedermann is premièred at the Finnish National Theatre in Helsinki, with Robert Kajanus conducting the Helsinki Philharmonic Orchestra in the incidental music by Jean Sibelius.
- unknown date – Carl Nielsen begins teaching at the Royal Danish Academy of Music.

== New works ==
- Kurt Atterberg – Symphony no. 3, "West Coast Pictures"
- Ludvig Holm – Concerto for violin and orchestra in G major
- Erkki Melartin – Symphony no 5 in A minor, Op. 90 ("Sinfonia brevis")
- Ture Rangström – Kronbruden
- Siegfried Salomon – Concerto for Violin and Orchestra in G minor
- Jean Sibelius
  - Everyman
  - Five Pieces, Op. 85

== Popular music ==
- Hugo Alfvén & K. G. Ossiannilsson – "Sveriges flagga"
- Emil Sjögren – "Födelsedagsmarsch" (for piano)

== Births ==
- 28 February – Svend Asmussen, Danish jazz violinist (died 2017)
- 17 June – Einar Englund, Finnish composer (died 1999)
- 19 October – Karl-Birger Blomdahl, Swedish composer and conductor (died 1968)
- 15 November – Greta Gynt, Norwegian singer, dancer and actress (died 2000)
- 19 December – Ørnulf Gulbransen, Norwegian flautist and music teacher (died 2004)

== Deaths ==
- 26 February – Abraham Ojanperä, Finnish singer and teacher (born 1856)
- 11 May – Christian Cappelen, Norwegian organist and composer (born 1845)
- 14 July – Lars August Lundh, Swedish composer (born 1838)
- 7 October – Amalia Hjelm, Swedish composer (born 1846)

== See also ==
- 1916 in Denmark
- 1916 in Norwegian music
- 1916 in Sweden
