= 1976 in Norwegian music =

The following is a list of notable events and releases of the year 1976 in Norwegian music.

== Events ==
=== April ===
- 9 – The 3rd Vossajazz started in Vossavangen, Norway (April 9 – 11).

=== May ===
- 19
  - The 24th Bergen International Festival started in Bergen, Norway (May 19 – June 2).
  - The 4th Nattjazz started in Bergen, Norway (May 19 – June 2).

=== June ===
- 20 – The 7th Kalvøyafestivalen started at Kalvøya near by Oslo.

== Albums released ==
=== Unknown date ===
B

Odd Børretzen

- På Den Ene Siden (Camp Records), with Julius Hougen

E

Jan Eggum

- Trubadur (CBS Records)

F

Flying Norwegians

- Wounded Bird (Sonet Records)

K

Karin Krog

- Different Days Different Ways (Philips Records)
- Hi-Fly (Compendium Records) with Archie Shepp

N

Bjarne Nerem

- Everything Happens To Me (RCA Victor)

Lillebjørn Nilsen

- Hei-Fara! (Polydor Records)

R

Terje Rypdal

- After the Rain (ECM)

S

Øystein Sunde

- På Sangens Vinger (Philips Records)

== Deaths ==
February

- 20 – Erling Kjellsby, organist and composer (born 1901).

April

- 30 – Edvard Fliflet Bræin, composer and music conductor (born 1924).

June

- 6 – Ragnar Danielsen, pianist and composer (born 1917).
- 7 – Leif Rustad, cellist and radio pioneer (born 1903).

September

- 6 – Berit Brænne, actress, children's writer and songwriter (born 1918).

== Births ==
January

- 10 – Freddy Wike, jazz drummer.
- 22 – Sivert Høyem, vocalist, Madrugada.

February

- 13 — Thomas Hansen, musician known as "Saint Thomas" (died 2007).
- 14 – Liv Kristine Espenæs, singer/songwriter.
- 22 – Ian Kenneth Åkesson, black metal drummer, Dimmu Borgir.
- 26 – Karl Strømme, jazz trumpeter.

March

- 1 – Andreas Mjøs, multi-instrumentalist, record producer and composer, Jaga Jazzist.
- 10 – Ane Brun, singer and songwriter.
- 13 – Marianne Thorsen, classical violinist.
- 16 – Erlend Jentoft, saxophonist and composer.
- 19 – Thom Hell, singer and songwriter.
- 22 – Marita Solberg, soprano.

April

- 10 – Jan Werner Danielsen, singer (died 2006).
- 17 – Kjetil Steensnæs, jazz guitarist.
- 28 – Ivar "Ravi" Johansen, vocalist, keyboardist, trumpeter, composer, journalist and program manager.

May

- 13 – Lars Nedland, black metal vocalist, drummer, and keyboardist, Solefald.

June

- 3
  - Hilde Louise Asbjørnsen, jazz singer, songwriter, cabaret artist.
  - Roger Arntzen, jazz upright bassist, In The Country.
- 14 – Brynjard Tristan, bassist and songwriter.
- 17 – Kjetil Møster, jazz saxophonist and clarinetist and composer.
- 21 – Jarle Bernhoft, singer, multi-instrumentalist, composer and lyricist.
- 25 – Desirée Sparre-Enger, bubblegum dance singer.

July

- 14 – Erik Dæhlin, composer and performance artist.

August

- 8 – Olaf Olsen, drummer, BigBang.

September

- 9 – Kristoffer Rygg, vocalist, keyboardist and programmer.
- 25 – Morten "Opaque" Aasdahl Eliassen, rapper and songwriter.

October

- 1 – Ivar Grydeland, jazz guitarist and composer.
- 10 – Stella Getz, pop singer.
- 17 – Kjartan Salvesen, pop singer.
- 19 – Jostein Gulbrandsen, jazz guitarist and composer.

November

- 13 – Nell Sigland, singer.
- 18 – Stian Shagrath Thoresen, vocalist and multi instrumentalist, Dimmu Borgir.

December

- 6 – Ole Børud, singer, songwriter and instrumentalist.
- 18 – Shaun Bartlett, singer, lyricist and composer.
- 23 – Natalia Strelchenko, Russian born Norwegian concert pianist (died 2015).

Unknown date

- Håkon Thelin, upright bass player and composer.
- Johannes Sæbøe, pop/rock guitarist.
- Kjell-Ole Haune, composer and music producer.
- Øyvind Torvund, composer.

== See also ==
- 1976 in Norway
- Music of Norway
- Norway in the Eurovision Song Contest 1976
