= 1921 in Nordic music =

The following is a list of notable events and compositions of the year 1921 in Nordic music.

== Events ==
- January–March – Jean Sibelius makes the last of his four visits to Britain.
- 26 November – Rued Langgaard's Music of the Spheres is performed for the first time, at the Konzerthaus, Karlsruhe, Germany. After 1921, it is not performed again until the 1960s, after Langgaard's death.

== New works ==
- Hakon Børresen – Kaddara (opera)
- Rued Langgaard – Music of the Spheres
- Wilhelm Stenhammar – Sången. En symfonisk kantat

== Popular music ==
- Gustaf Nordqvist & Edvard Evers – "Jul, jul, strålande jul"

== Births ==
- 7 May – Reidar Bøe, Norwegian singer and composer (died 1969)
- 18 October – Willy Andresen, Norwegian jazz pianist and orchestra leader (died 2016).
- 13 November – Joonas Kokkonen, Finnish composer (died 1996)
- 21 November – Margrethe Schanne, Danish ballerina (died 2014)
- 7 December – Arne Dørumsgaard, Norwegian composer, poet, translator and music collector (died 2006).

== Deaths ==
- 22 November – Christina Nilsson, Swedish operatic soprano and composer (born 1843)
- 5 December – Ellen Bergman, Swedish musician and singing teacher (born 1842)
- unknown date – Hilda Sandels, Swedish opera singer (born 1830)

== See also ==
- 1921 in Denmark
- 1921 in Iceland
- 1921 in Norwegian music
- 1921 in Sweden
