= 2014 in Nordic music =

The following is a list of notable events and releases that happened in Nordic music in 2014.

== Events ==
=== January ===
- 16 January
  - The Ice Music Festival opens in Geilo, Norway, lasting until 19 January.
  - Swedish band In Mourning announce that drummer Christian Netzell has left the band.
- 22 January – The Bodø Jazz Open opens in Bodø, Norway, lasting until 26 January.
- 24 January
  - The Nordlysfestivalen opens in Tromsø, Norway, running until 2 February.
  - Anne-Lise Sollied Allemano (soprano) is awarded the Nordlysprisen at Nordlysfestivalen.
- 30 January – Kristiansund Opera Festival opens, running until 15 February.

=== February ===
- 5 February – The Polarjazz Festival opens in Longyearbyen, Norway, running until 9 February.
- 21 February – Per ‘Sodomizer’ Eriksson leaves Katatonia, to be temporarily replaced by Bruce Soord (The Pineapple Thief, Wisdom of Crowds) and Tomas Åkvik (Nale).
- 28 February – Swedish DJ Avicii's single Wake Me Up becomes the first song in history to surpass 200 million listeners on Spotify, making it the platform's most-streamed track at the time. The song will remain the most-played track on the platform for 506 days until overtaken in May 2015.

=== March ===
- 14 March – The Narvik Winter Festival opens in Norway (March 14 – 23).

=== April ===
- 2 April – In Mourning announce that Mattias Bender will be their new drummer.
- 3 April – The two-day Tape to Zero event starts at Victoria, National jazz scene in Oslo.
- 11 April – Vossajazz opens at Vossavangen, Norway, running until 13 April.
- 12 April
  - Sigbjørn Apeland is awarded the Vossajazzprisen 2014.
  - Mats Eilertsen performs the commissioned work Rubicon for Vossajazz 2014.
- 16 April – Inferno Metal Festival 2014 opens in Oslo (April 16–19).
- 17 April – Daniel Liljekvist leaves Katatonia, and is temporarily replaced by JP Asplund and Daniel Moilanen (ex-Engel) in succession.
- 23 April – SoddJazz opens in Inderøy Municipality, Nord-Trøndelag, Norway, running until 27 April.

=== May ===
- 10 May – The final of the Eurovision Song Contest 2014 takes place in Copenhagen, Denmark, presented by Danish television presenter Lise Rønne, musician Nikolaj Koppel and actor Pilou Asbæk. The best-performing of the Scandinavian countries is Sweden, who finish in third place with "Undo" performed by Sanna Nielsen.
- 21 May – The Festspillene i Bergen opens in Norway (May 21 – June 4).

=== June ===
- 11 June – Bergenfest opens in Bergen, Norway, lasting until 15 June.
- 21 June – Festspillene i Nord-Norge opens in Harstad, Norway, lasting until 28 June.

=== July ===
- 2 July – The Kongsberg Jazzfestival opens at Kongsberg, Norway, running until 5 July.
- 5 July – Mathias Eick receives the Kongsberg Jazz Award or DNB.prisen 2014 at the Kongsberg Jazzfestival.
- 10 July – The Stavernfestivalen opens in Stavern, Norway, lasting until 12 July.
- 14 July – Moldejazz opens in Molde, Norway, with Sidsel Endresen as artist in residence (July 14–19).
- 15 July – Norwegian trio Monkey Plot win the JazzIntro 2014 award.

=== August ===
- 11 August – The Oslo Jazzfestival opens in Norway, running until 16 August.
- 12 August – Odd André Elveland receives the Ella-prisen 2014 at the Oslo Jazzfestival.
- 31 August – The Danish National Symphony Orchestra announces the appointment of Fabio Luisi as its next principal conductor on a 3-year contract from 2017.

=== September ===
- 1 September – The Helsinki Philharmonic Orchestra announces the appointment of Susanna Mälkki as its next chief conductor on a 3-year contract from autumn 2016.
- 4 September – The Punktfestivalen opens in Kristiansand, Norway, running until 6 September.
- 10 September – The Ultima Oslo Contemporary Music Festival 2014 starts in Oslo, Norway, running until 20 September.
- 17 September – Nordic Music Days 2014 begins in Oslo, Norway, running until 20 September; it is hosted by the Ultima Oslo Contemporary Music Festival for the Norwegian Society of Composers.

=== October ===
- 17 October – The Ekkofestival opens in Bergen, Norway, running until 25 October.
- 20 October – The Asker Jazz Festival opens in Asker Municipality, Norway, running until 26 October.
- 23 October – The Insomnia Festival opens in Tromsø, Norway, running until 26 October.

=== November ===
- 12 November – The Vardø Blues Festival (Blues i Vintermørket) opens in Norway, running until 15 November.
- 13 November – The 9th Barents Jazz, Tromsø International Jazz Festival opens in Tromsø, Norway, running until 15 November.

=== December ===
- 11 December – The Nobel Peace Prize Concert is held at Telenor Arena in Oslo, Norway.

== New works ==
- Kaija Saariaho – Maan Varjot

== Albums released ==
=== January ===
Day	Artist	Album	Label	Notes	Ref.
6	Jan Gunnar Hoff	Fly North	Losen Records		
10	Arve Henriksen	Chron	Rune Grammofon		
17	Tord Gustavsen Quartet	Extended Circle	ECM Records	Produced by Manfred Eicher	
20	The Haunted	Eye of the Storm		EP	
21	Persuader	The Fiction Maze	Inner Wound Recordings	EP	
27	Kampfar	Djevelmakt	Indie Recordings		
27	Hildegunn Øiseth	Valencia	Losen Records		
27	Sister	Disguised Vultures	Metal Blade		
31	Grand Magus	Triumph and Power	Nuclear Blast		

=== February ===
Day	Artist	Album	Label	Notes	Ref.
7	Espen Berg	Acres Of Blue	Atterklang		-

=== March ===
Day	Artist	Album	Label	Notes	Ref.
4	Wolves Like Us	Black Soul Choir	Prosthetic Records		
7	Motorpsycho with Reine Fiske	Behind The Sun	Rune Grammofon		
11	Nocturnal Breed	Napalm Nights	Agonia Records	First album for 7 years	
21	Avicii	True: Avicii By Avicii	Rune Grammofon	Remix	
28	Stian Westerhus & Pale Horses	Maelstrom	Rune Grammofon		
28	Paul Bley	Play Blue (Oslo Concert)	ECM Records	Produced by Manfred Eicher	

=== April ===
Day	Artist	Album	Label	Notes	Ref.
7	Baker Hansen	Chet På Norsk / Ei Som Deg	NorCD		
11	Hedvig Mollestad Trio	Enfant Terrible	Rune Grammofon		
25	Marius Neset	Lion	ACT Music		

=== May ===
Day	Artist	Album	Label	Notes	Ref.
16	Jacob Young	Forever Young	ECM Records	Produced by Manfred Eicher	

=== June ===
Day	Artist	Album	Label	Notes	Ref.
30	Sanna Nielsen	7	Parlophone, Warner Music Group		

=== July ===
Day	Artist	Album	Label	Notes	Ref.
1	Sonic Syndicate	Sonic Syndicate			
1	25	Crystal Eyes	Killer	Massacre Records	

=== August ===
Day	Artist	Album	Label	Notes	Ref.
22	The Nature of Connections	Arve Henriksen	Rune Grammofon		

=== September ===
Day	Artist	Album	Label	Notes	Ref.
19	Karl Seglem	Som Spor	NorCD		

=== October ===
Day	Artist	Album	Label	Notes	Ref.
3	Eple Trio	Universal Cycle	Shipwreckords		
14	Scar Symmetry	The Singularity (Phase I – Neohumanity)			
17	Bjørn Alterhaug Quintet	Innocent Play	Ponca Jazz Records		
17	In the Country & Frida Ånnevik	Skogenes Sang	Grappa Music		
24	Lumen Drones (Nils Økland, Per Steinar Lie, Ørjan Haaland)	Lumen Drones	ECM		
24	Liv Kristine	Vervain	Napalm Records		
24	Ketil Bjørnstad	A Passion For John Donne	ECM Records		
24	Terje Isungset & Arve Henriksen	World Of Glass	All Ice Records		

=== November ===
Day	Artist	Album	Label	Notes	Ref.
1	Gisle Torvik and Hardanger Big Band	Kryssande	NorCD		
6	Larz-Kristerz	40 mil från Stureplan	Sony Music		
10	Christer Fredriksen	Trademark	Losen Records		
7	Sidsel Endresen & Stian Westerhus	Bonita	Rune Grammofon		
7	Albatrosh	Night Owl	Rune Grammofon		
28	Kristoffer Eikrem & Kjetil Jerve	Feeling // Emotion	NorCD		

=== December ===
Day	Artist	Album	Label	Notes	Ref.
5	Mors Principium Est	Dawn of the 5th Era	AFM Records		
8	Taake	Stridens hus	Dark Essence Records	All tracks by Hoest	
25	The Project Hate MCMXCIX	There Is No Earth I Will Leave Unscorched			

== Deaths ==
- 24 July – Christian Falk (52), Swedish record producer and musician
- 15 August – Svein Nymo (61), Norwegian violinist and composer
- 19 August – Kåre Kolberg (78), Norwegian composer.
- 29 August – Jan Groth (68), Norwegian vocalist (cancer)
- 10 October – Olav Dale (55), Norwegian jazz saxophonist, composer and orchestra leader
- 11 October – Mats Rondin (54), Swedish cellist and composer (heart attack)
- 8 December – Knut Nystedt (99), Norwegian composer.
- 12 December – John Persen (73), Norwegian composer.
