= Jack Noren =

American jazz drummer and vocalist

Jack Noren (October 19, 1929, in Chicago – March 17, 1990, in Chicago) was a jazz drummer and vocalist born in America but best known for his work in Sweden.

Noren was born in Chicago to parents of Swedish ancestry. He played with Gene Ammons and others in the middle of the 1940s before moving with his family to Sweden in 1946. There he worked as a lumberjack briefly before joining a Swedish jazz band as a replacement for a sick drummer. This led to time spent touring and/or recording with Thore Jederby (1948–50), Nisse Skoog (1948), Seymour Österwall (1949), Arne Domnérus and Rolf Ericson (1950–52), and Lars Gullin (1951–53). In addition to playing with Swedish musicians and ensembles such as Reinhold Svensson (1949), Gösta Törner (1949), Swede Starband (1950), Expressens Elitorkester (1950, 1952), Leonard Feather's Swinging Swedes (1951) Bengt Hallberg (1952), Putte Wickman (1952), Åke Persson, and the Scandia All Stars (1953). He also recorded as a vocalist with Jederby (1949), Domnérus/Ericson (1951), and the drummer Anders Burman (1952). Noren's reputation in Sweden was such that he was frequently called upon by visiting American musicians, such as James Moody (1949, 1951), Charlie Parker (1950), Zoot Sims (1950), Stan Getz (1951), Lee Konitz (1951), Clifford Brown (1953), and George Wallington (1953).

In 1954 Noren returned to Chicago, playing with Eddie Higgins (1958) and Marty Rubenstein (1959–60). In 1960 he went once more to Sweden, playing with Monica Zetterlund (1960) and Nisse Sandström; he also recorded with the radio band of Harry Arnold. After moving back to the United States a few years later, his career dips into obscurity.

Jack Noren is survived by his kids and grand kids. One grandson (Shane Noren) currently plays in the Rock band To Begin Anew.
