= 2000 in Nordic music =

The following is a list of notable events and releases that happened in Nordic music in 2000.

== Events ==
- 14 April – On the first day of Norway's annual Vossajazz festival, Ivar Kolve is awarded the festival prize.
- 13 May – The 45th Eurovision Song Contest final is held in Stockholm's Globe Arena, is won by Denmark's Olsen Brothers and the song "Fly on the Wings of Love".
- 25 May – At the 53rd Cannes Film Festival, Icelandic singer Björk wins the Best Actress Award for her performance in Dancer in the Dark.
- 6 October – The Ultima Oslo Contemporary Music Festival opens in Norway, running until 15 October. It includes works by Wolfgang Rihm, Gyorgy Kurtag and Morton Feldman, as well as Finland's Kaija Saariaho.

== Classical works ==
- Magnus Lindberg – Corrente (revised); China Version
- Aulis Sallinen – Kuningas Lear (opera)
- Benjamin Staern – 3The Threat of War for symphony orchestra

== Film and television scores ==
- Bent Fabricius-Bjerre – Blinkende Lygter
- Søren Hyldgaard – Hjælp, Jeg er en Fisk

== Top hit singles ==
- Aqua – "Cartoon Heroes" (#1 Denmark, Italy, Norway, Spain)
- Creamy – "Den Bedste Jul I 2000 År" (#1 Denmark)
- Darude – "Sandstorm" (#1 Canada, Norway; #3 Denmark, Finland, UK)
- DJ Aligator – "Lollipop" (#1 Denmark; #8 Sweden; #9 Norway)
- Olsen Brothers – "Smuk som et stjerneskud" (#1 Denmark, Sweden)

== Eurovision Song Contest ==
- Denmark in the Eurovision Song Contest 2000
- Finland in the Eurovision Song Contest 2000
- Iceland in the Eurovision Song Contest 2000
- Norway in the Eurovision Song Contest 2000
- Sweden in the Eurovision Song Contest 2000

== Births ==
- 20 April – Klara Hammarström, Swedish singer
- 23 October – Hanna Ferm, Swedish singer
- 20 December – Gaboro, Swedish rapper and songwriter (died 2024)
- 26 December – Isac Elliot, Finnish actor, dancer, singer and songwriter

== Deaths ==
- 29 January – Beate Asserson, Norwegian operatic mezzo-soprano (born 1913)
- 6 March – Ole Jacob Hansen, Norwegian jazz drummer (born 1940)
- 3 April – Greta Gynt, Norwegian dancer, singer and actress (born 1916)
- 25 April – Niels Viggo Bentzon, Danish composer (born 1919)
- 28 April – Kim Borg, Finnish operatic bass, teacher and composer (born 1919)
- 22 June – Svein Finnerud, Norwegian pianist and artist (born 1945)
- 31 August – Dan Fog, Danish music antiquarian and publisher (born 1919)
- 11 October – Sture Nordin, Swedish jazz bassist (born 1933; heart failure)
- 17 October – Joachim Nielsen, Norwegian rock musician, poet and songwriter (born 1964; heroin overdose)
