= 1937 in Nordic music =

The following is a list of notable events and compositions of the year 1937 in Nordic music.

== Events ==
- 5 April – Finnish conductor Georg Schnéevoigt arrives in Australia, hoping to encourage interest in Finnish music. He is said to be the first musician to travel from the UK to Australia by air.
- unknown date
  - Peder Gram becomes director of music at the Danish Broadcasting Corporation.
  - Jón Leifs resigns as musical director of the Icelandic National Broadcasting Service after two years in post, and returns to Germany.

== New works ==
- Uuno Klami – Intermezzo, for cor anglais and chamber orchestra
- Rued Langgaard – Symphony No. 15 "Søstormen" (Storm at Sea)
- Lars-Erik Larsson – Symphony No. 2

== Recordings ==
- Karlakór Reykjavíkur (Reykjavík Men's Choir) – Á aðventu með Karlakór Reykjavíkur

== Popular music ==
- Jules Sylvain & Åke Söderblom – "Klart till drabbning"

== Film music ==
- Kai Gullmar – Familjen Andersson
- Jules Sylvain – Sara lär sig folkvett
- Olof Thiel – Häxnatten

== Musical films ==
- Frk. Møllers jubilæum, starring Victor Borge, with music by Victor Cornelius & Karen Jønsson

== Births ==
- 27 January – Fred Åkerström, Swedish folk guitarist and singer (died 1985)
- 7 February – Svante Thuresson, Swedish jazz musician (died 2021)
- 6 March – Arild Nyquist, Norwegian writer and musician (died 2004)
- 10 March – Alfred Janson, Norwegian pianist and composer (died 2019)
- 6 July – Vladimir Ashkenazy, Soviet-born pianist and conductor, Icelandic citizen
- 8 August – Cornelis Vreeswijk, Dutch-born singer-songwriter who worked mainly in Sweden (died 1987)
- 20 September – Monica Zetterlund, Swedish singer and actress (died 2005)
- 18 December – Knut Skram, Norwegian operatic baritone

== Deaths ==
- 30 January – Anna Bergström-Simonsson, Swedish singing teacher (born 1853)
- 14 February – Erkki Melartin, Finnish composer (born 1875)
- 22 March – Thorvald Aagaard, Danish organist and composer (born 1877)
- 17 October – Ludvig Birkedal-Barfod, Danish organist and composer (born 1850)
- 15 November – Eero Järnefelt, Finnish artist, brother of Armas Järnefelt and Aino Sibelius (born 1863)

== See also ==
- 1937 in Denmark
- 1937 in Iceland
- 1937 in Norwegian music
- 1937 in Sweden
