= Emilius Bangert =

Danish musician (1883–1962)

Emilius Bangert (19 August 1883 – 19 August 1962) was a Danish composer, organist, and professor. He played the organ at Roskilde Cathedral and also composed orchestral and chamber music.

== Biography ==
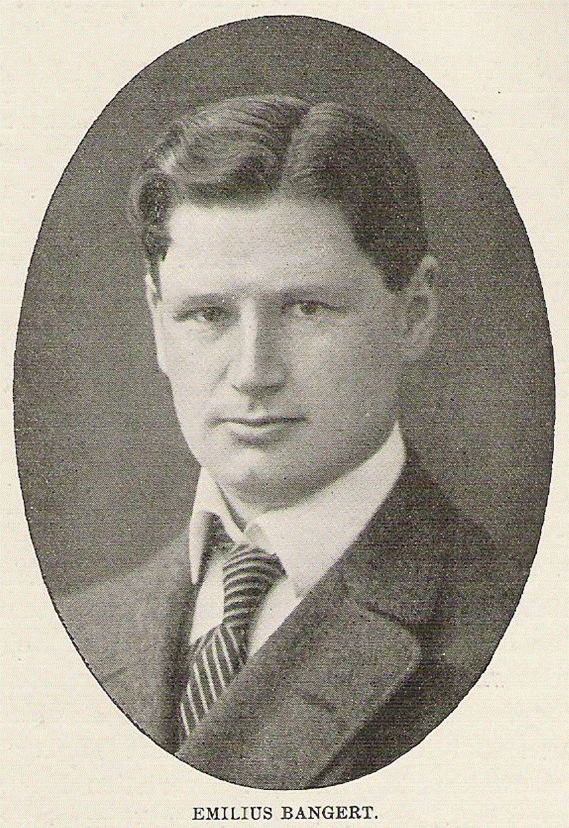
Emilius Bangert

Emilius Ferdinand Caspar Bangert was born in Copenhagen, the son of Conrad Bangert and Ida Anderson. In 1902, he graduated from Borgerdydskolen (School of Civic Virtue), Copenhagen’s most prestigious private school. He acquired a cand. phil. degree in 1903. He was a private pupil in theory and composition with Carl Nielsen 1902–07. He contributed several times to compositions that Nielsen had received orders for either transcript, instrumentation, or directly as a composer. Emilius Bangert also had piano lessons with Henrik Knudsen and organ lessons with Edgar Henrichsen and Eugene Gigout in Paris. In 1913 he received the Ancker Award scholarship (Det anckerske Legat) and went on study tour to Germany and Italy.

In 1908 he took the exam organist. From 1915, he was organist at various churches, the first being Skovshoved church (Skovshoved kirke) and the last being Roskilde Cathedral (Roskilde Domkirke) to 1955. In the years 1908–09, he conducted Bangert Academic Orchestra. From 1912, he was music critic for the Copenhagen newspaper Hovedstaden. He taught organ at the Royal Danish Academy of Music (Danske Musikkonservatorium) in 1925 and was a professor from 1949–55, where Leif Thybo was amongst his pupils. In 1931 he gave the first performance of Carl Nielsen's Commotio.

His compositions included a symphony, overture, string quartet, sonatas, choral works and songs. Emilius Bangert transcribed compositions by Dieterich Buxtehude and published them in 1942. Today the original transcriptions are in the Royal Danish Library (Det Kongelige Bibliotek). Emilius Bangert was made a Knight of the first degree of Order of the Dannebrog.

== Selected works ==
- Violinsonate i c-mol (1905)
- Strygekvartet i D-dur (1906)
- Symfoni i C-dur (1907)
- Willemoes (1908) – with Carl Nielsen
- Kantate ved landsudstillingen i Århus (1909) – with Carl Nielsen
- en række sange (1910)
- Jeg vælger mig april (koncertouverture) (1913)
- Violinsonate i A-dur (1926)

== Other sources ==
- Buxtehude, Dietrich Klavervaerker / udg. af Emilius Bangert (Wilhelm Hansen. 1944)
