= Commotio (Nielsen) =

Music composition by Carl Nielsen

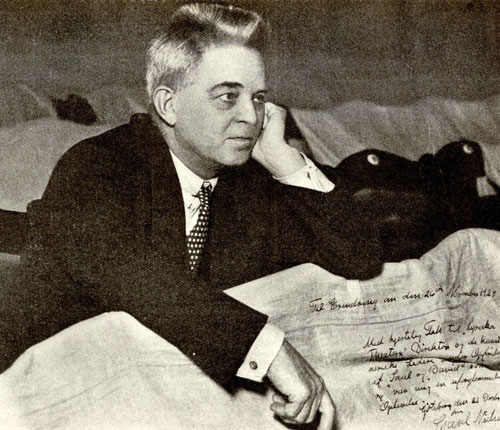
Carl Nielsen in 1928

Carl Nielsen's Commotio or Commotio for Organ, Opus 58, was composed between June 1930 and February 1931. The composer's last major work, it was first performed privately on 24 April 1931 in the chapel at Christiansborg Palace in Copenhagen.

== Background ==
Commotio was considered by Nielsen to be a particularly important work. In a letter to his son-in-law Emil Telmányi on 24 February 1931 he wrote: "None of my other works has demanded such great concentration as this: an attempt to reconstitute what is truly the only valid organ style, the polyphonic music that is especially suited to this instrument, which for a long time has been regarded as a kind of orchestra, which it absolutely is not." Nielsen also commented on the length of the piece: at 22 to 24 minutes, it was longer than any of Bach's organ works.

There was great interest in the piece by Danish organists, resulting in several private performances. In addition to that at the Christiansborg Palace Chapel, there were two performances by Peter Thomsen, two by Finn Viderø on 14 June on the Marcussen organ in St Nikolai's Church, Copenhagen, one a week later by Emilius Bangert in Roskilde Cathedral and yet one more by Peter Thomsen in July.

== Reception ==
The first public performance was in Aarhus Cathedral on 14 August 1931 where the organist was Emilius Bangert. Despite poor health due to heart problems, Nielsen was present. There do not appear to be any reviews of this performance.

After news of the new organ work reached Germany, Erwin Zillinger, an organist from Schleswig, asked Bangert and Nielsen whether Commotio could be played at the Nordic-German Organ Week to be held in Lübeck that October. Nielsen had hoped to be present but weakness resulting from poor health prevented him from travelling. Bangert, who had been selected as the organist, travelled alone to Lübeck where, a day or two later, he heard of Nielsen's death. The concert therefore suddenly became a valedictory performance.

The review by Svend-Ove Møller in Dansk Kirkemusiker-Tidende conveyed the emotional experience: “Mixed with the melancholy feelings that fill us on the death of Nielsen, is gratitude that it was granted him to complete this work, which we may designate without exaggeration as the most significant production in recent organ literature. Nielsen understood as few others did how to deploy the resources of his time such that they do not appear modern in the negative sense. His mode of expression, peculiar and distinctive as it may be, feels quite natural; not for an instant does one get the impression that he sought out new paths simply to get away from the well known roads; the affectation which so often characterizes modern music is not to be found in Carl Nielsen; his thoroughly wholesome musical idiom and his ability to create living music has produced here an organ work of enduring value. Emilius Bangert gave Nielsen’s work a masterly performance..."

== Music ==
In connection with the Lübeck performance, Nielsen was invited to provide programme notes. First explaining in a footnote that Commotio meant "Movement, also spiritual", he continued (translated from Nielsen's German): "The Latin word Commotio really applies to all music, but the word is used more specifically here as an expression of self-objectification. In a major work for the mighty instrument that is called the organ, whose sound is determined by the natural element we call air, the composer must attempt to suppress all personal, lyrical feelings. The expression becomes great and rigorous and demands a kind of dryness instead of the emotional, and must rather be gazed at with the ear than embraced by the heart. The work is borne up by two fugues, to which an introduction, intervening movements and coda cling like climbing plants to the tree-trunks of the forest; however, the composer thinks that further analysis is superfluous."

== Discography ==
The table below lists commercially available recordings of Commotio:

No.	Organist	Time	Rec. (Note: Refers to the year in which the performers recorded the work; this may not be the same as the year in which the recording was first released to the general public.)	Recording venue	Label	Ref.
1	Finn Viderø	21:12	1960	Battell Chapel	Danacord	
2	Elisabeth Westenholz	21:00	1979	Grundtvig's Church	BIS	
3	Ulrik Spang-Hanssen	22:42	1987	Church of Our Lady, Assens	Paula	
4	Paul Trepte	?	1992	Ely Cathedral	Heritage	
5	Christopher Herrick	20:47	1993	Turku Cathedral	Hyperion	
6	Kevin Bowyer	21:07	1996	Odense Cathedral	Nimbus	
7	Knud Vad	25:13	1996	Sorø Abbey Church	Danacord	
8	Grethe Krogh	23:50	?	Holmens Kirke	Danacord	
9	David Goode	21:17	1998	Christ Church Cathedral, Oxford	Herald	
10	Friedhelm Flamme	20:15	2008	Stiftskirche, Bad Gandersheim	cpo	
11	Philip Schmidt-Madsen	23:44	2012	Christiansborg Slotskirke	Naxos	
12	Keith John	22:20?	2012	Gloucester Cathedral	Willowhayne	
13	Anders Eidsten Dahl	23:05	?	Bragernes Church	LAWO	
14	Søren Johannsen	21:44	2015	Christian's Church, Copenhagen	Naxos	
15	Bine Katrine Bryndorf	23:27	2016	Nikolaj Kunsthal	Dacapo	
16	Inge Bønnerup	22:53	?	Vartov Church	CDKlassisk	
17	Kevin Duggan	25:13	2019	Dunblane Cathedral	Odradek	
18	Egor Kolesov	21:00	?	?	Base2 Music	
19	James Hicks	?	?	?	Pro Organo	
20	Marko Kupari	?	?	?	Pilfink	

== Orchestrations ==
Two orchestral versions of Commotio were made in recent years, by Bo Holten, who conducted the Odense Symphony Orchestra himself in 2007, as well as Hans Abrahamsen, whose version was performed by conductor Fabio Luisi and the Danish Radio Symphony Orchestra in 2016.
