= Karl Valentin (composer) =

Swedish composer

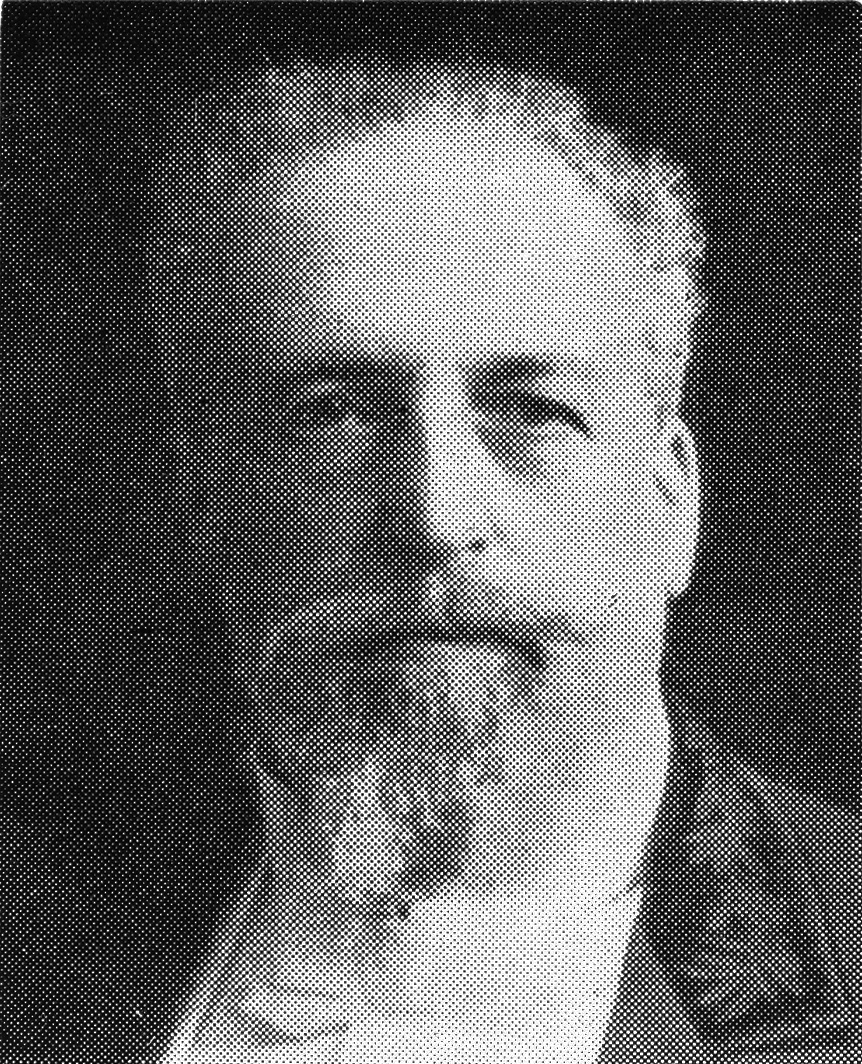
Karl Valentin.

Karl Fritjof Valentin (30 May 1853 – 1 April 1918) was a Swedish composer, the son of Isaac Philip Valentin. Valentin was born in Gothenburg. He worked a few years for Julius Bagge in Stockholm. From 1879, he was a student at the Leipzig Conservatory of Music in Germany, where he defended his Ph.D. thesis Studien über die schwedischen Volksmelodien ("Studies on the Swedish Folk Melodies") in 1884. On 20 December 1897, he was elected member no. 492 of the Royal Swedish Academy of Music. Valentin was the Academy's secretary from 1901 to 1918. At the Academy, he taught music history and aesthetics from 1903 to 1918. In 1897, he was awarded the Litteris et Artibus. His son was the Swedish author and journalist Guido Valentin.
