= 1894 in Norwegian music =

The following is a list of notable events and releases of the year 1894 in Norwegian music.

== Events ==
- Pianist Erika Nissen (1845-1903) is granted an artist's scholarship by the Norwegian state.

== Deaths ==
June

- 1 – Sophie Dedekam, composer and diarist (born 1820).

== Births ==
April

- 13 – Ludvig Irgens-Jensen, twentieth-century composer (died 1969).

== See also ==
- 1894 in Norway
- Music of Norway
