= Adèle Almati =

German-Swedish opera singer (1861–1919)

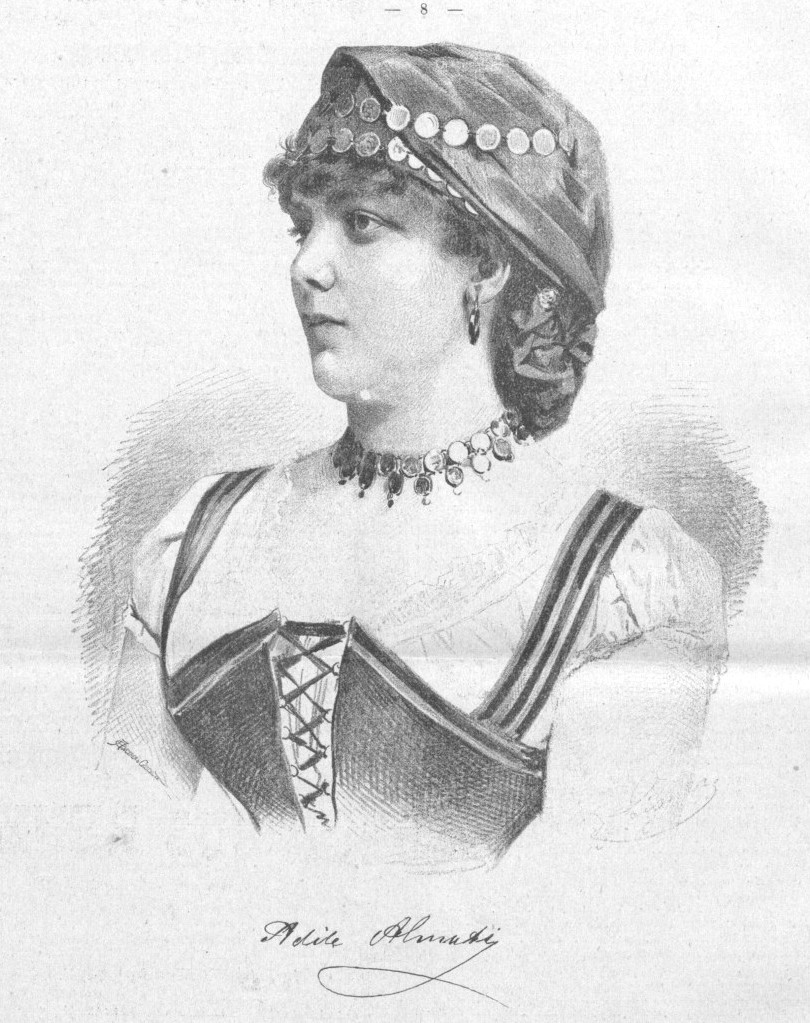
Adèle Almati

Alma Adèle Louise Almati née Heitmann (1861–1919) was a German-born Swedish mezzo-soprano opera singer who sang at the Royal Swedish Opera between 1886 and 1897. Important roles included Amneris in Aida, Azucena in Il trovatore and Brünhilde in Die Walküre.

== Biography ==
Born in Jersey City on 23 February 1861, Adèle Heitmann was the daughter of the German sea captain Berthold Hein Heitmann and Emma Henrietta Gercken. Following the death of her parents, she was adopted by the Swedish telegraph executive Alfred Harald Emil Fich and his wife who moved to Stockholm in 1868. After completing her schooling, she was taught solo singing at the Royal Swedish Conservatory under the opera singers Julius Günther and Isidor Dannström, with training in drama by Signe Hebbe. She received further voice training under Leocadie Gerlach in Copenhagen and from Mathilde Marchesi in both Vienna and Paris.

After engagements in both Vienna and Budapest, using the name of Almati, she made her operatic début as Azucena in Il trovatore, performing the role in Berlin, Copenhagen and Hamburg. Thereafter she returned to Stockholm in 1886, where she played Carmen at the Royal Theatre. Apart from a study trip to Italy in 1889, she continued to perform there until her retirement in 1897. She then moved abroad. In 1895, she married the Swedish opera director, Ernst Axel Rundberg who died in 1901. In 1910, she married the German concert singer Gustav Adolf Henkels.
