= String Quartet No. 2 (Nielsen) =

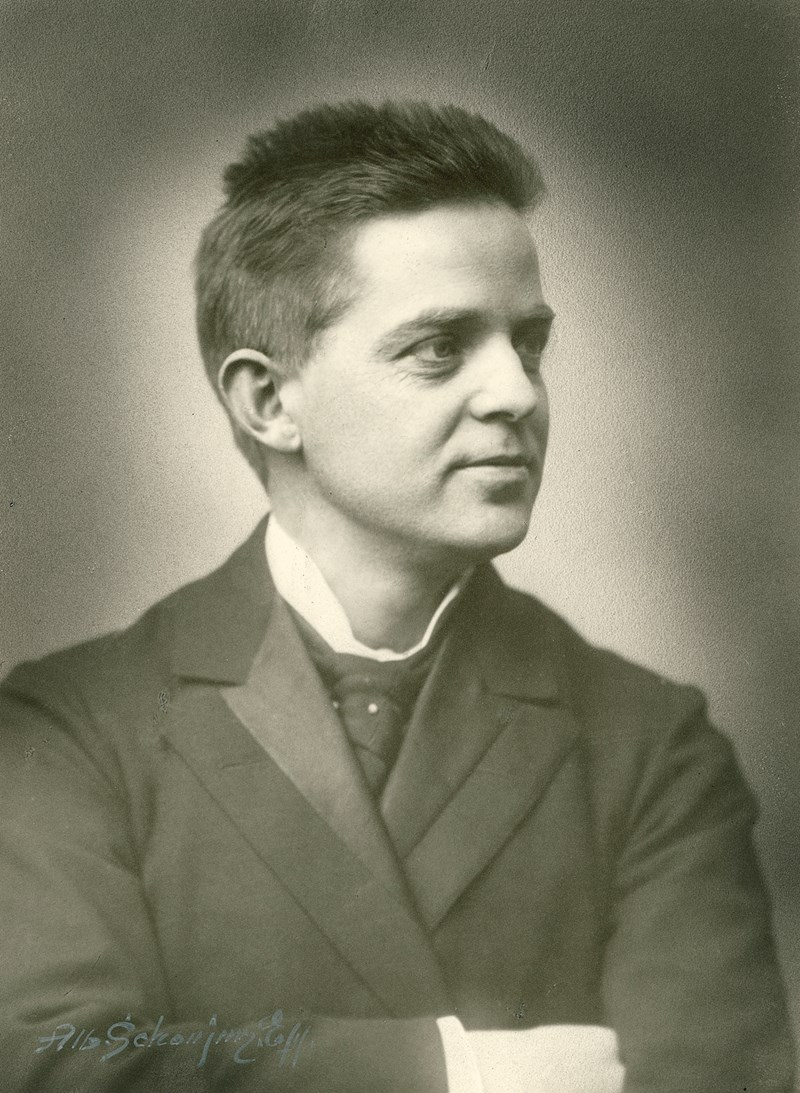
Carl Nielsen in 1901

Carl Nielsen's String Quartet No. 2 in F minor, Op. 5, was composed in 1890, partly in Denmark but mostly in Germany where the composer was travelling on a stipend. The second of Nielsen's four string quartets in the official series, it was first performed privately for Joseph Joachim on 18 November 1890 at the Hochschule für Ausübende Tonkunst in Berlin.

== Background ==
Nielsen reported in an interview that he was inspired to write the first movement of his second quartet when the theme suddenly occurred to him on a crowded tram in Copenhagen. In July 1890, in a letter written at his childhood home at Nørre Lyndelse, on the island of Funen, to his teacher Orla Rosenhoff, he indicated that the first movement had been completed and was ready for fair copying. A diary entry on 29 September states that he had just completed the third movement in Dresden. But the second movement caused him considerable trouble and it was not until 5 November, when he was in Berlin, that he reported: "Today got further at last in the Andante (later Poco adagio) for the quartet on which I have long stood still." He told Rosenhoff in a letter dated 24 November: "I have rewritten the Andante three times." However, it was only on 28 November that he wrote: "Have finished the Andante in the quartet today. At last! What that piece has cost me!" He had already completed the fourth movement before he left Dresden on 13 November.

Despite five rehearsals, Nielsen was still nervous about performing the quartet for the famous Joseph Joachim during the afternoon of 18 December. Immediately after the performance he wrote; "We had held five rehearsals and yet it still sounded very mediocre; it is extremely difficult to play well, since there are so many modulations, often enharmonic affairs that have to be played so cleanly that half the difficulty would have been enough. If you add to this the fear of playing for Joachim, you can imagine that it did not go all that well." Joachim did however offer encouragement, "praising (him) greatly for the parts he liked". Later he explained how much he admired the "imagination and talent" with which the music had been written. Although Joachim suggested that the composer should rework the places he considered best in his work, Nielsen understandably refused to do so and Joachim finally conceded: "Well, my dear Mr. Nielsen, perhaps I am just an old Philistine. Write as you wish, as long as that is how you feel it."

== Reception ==
The second quartet was first performed in public in Copenhagen on 8 April 1892 in the smaller hall at the Odd Fellows Mansion with Anton Svendsen, Holger Møller, Christian Petersen and Frits Bendix. The work was well received and the reviews were good. The often critical Charles Kjærulf wrote in Politiken: "It emerged as clearly as anything that this talent is already capable of a quite remarkable tour de force: so fertile and swelling that it truly warms one’s heart and makes the blood course faster." Berlinske Aftenavis was equally encouraging, believing the piece "went on to show that Mr. Carl Nielsen is a young composer from whom one seems justified in expecting something significant." The piece was performed once more at Nielsen's composer's evening on 28 April 1892 with even more enthusiastic reviews.

During his lifetime, Nielsen's Quartet in F minor became one of his most frequently played works, not only in Denmark, but also, for example in Amsterdam, Rotterdam, Berlin, Leipzig, Manchester, Mexico and Buenos Aires. Nielsen dedicated the work to Anton Svendsen, leader of the Neruda Quartet, who played it on several occasions at the Kammermusikforeningen (Chamber Music Society).

== Music ==
- The turbulent opening of the Allegro non troppo ma energico, with the syncopated rhythm of the main theme, contrasts with the romantic second theme played first by the cello and then by the violin.
- The rather sad second movement, Un poco adagio, precedes
- an appealing Allegretto scherzando.
- The finale, Allegro appassionato, presents an innovative adventure in tonality backed by the repeated opening theme on the violin.
