= Zulamith Wellander =

Swedish operatic mezzo-soprano

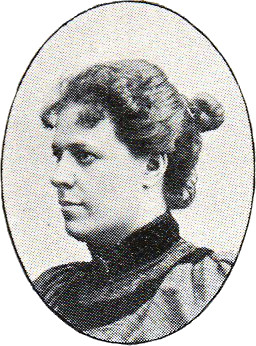

Background information
- Born: 2 April 1857
- Died: 27 February 1919 (aged 61)
- Genres: opera
- Instruments: mezzo-soprano

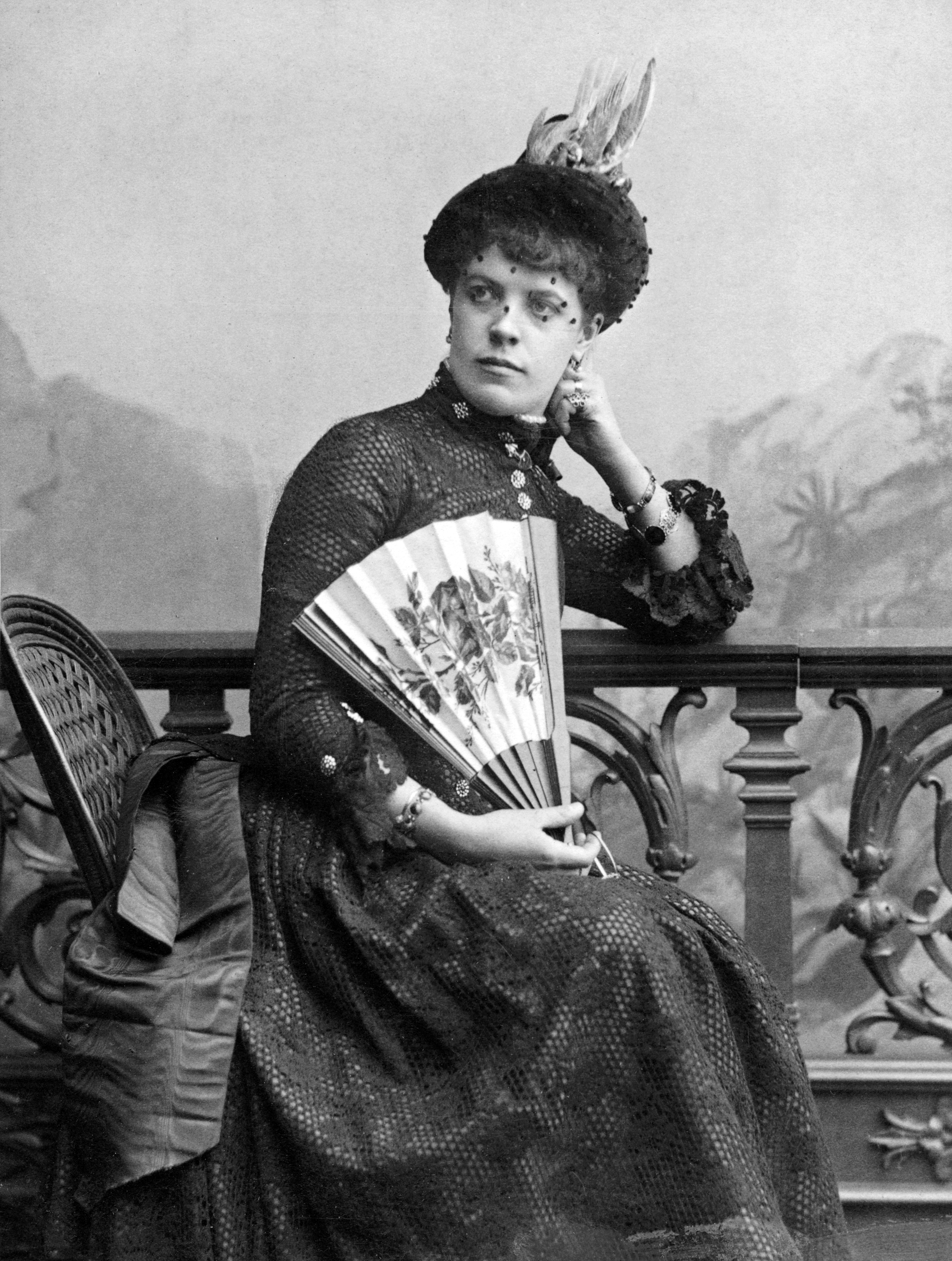
Zulamith Wellander (1884)

Zulamith Maria Wellander-Svaneskog (2 April 1857 – 27 February 1919) was a Swedish operatic mezzo-soprano who performed at the Royal Theatre in Stockholm from 1877 to 1889, also taking engagements in Augsburg, Berlin, Kassel and Copenhagen during the same period. On retiring from the stage, she became a voice teacher in Stockholm.

== Biography ==
Born in Härnösand, Wellander moved to Stockholm when she was 15 to study music with support from Lilly Bächström. She completed her education abroad in 1879 under Lilli Lehmann and Mathilde Marchesi.

After returning to Sweden after performing in various opera used in Germany, she performed at the Royal Theatre from 1885 to 1888. Her roles included Ortrud in Lohengrin, Bergadrottningen in Den bergtagna, Martha in Faust and Asuzena in Il trovatore.

On retirement from the stage, Zulamith Wellander worked as a voice teacher in Stockholm where she died on 27 February 1919.
