= 1924 in Norwegian music =

The following is a list of notable events and releases of the year 1924 in Norwegian music.

== Events ==
- Kringkastningselskapet A/S was founded. This was the predecessor to the Norwegian Broadcasting Corporation, established in 1933.

== Deaths ==
April

- 12 – Sjur Helgeland, hardingfele fiddler and composer (born 1858).

== Births ==
June

- 6 – Gunnar Brunvoll, impresario and opera administrator (died 1999).

August

- 23 – Edvard Fliflet Bræin, composer and conductor (died 1976).

October

- 18 – Egil Hovland, composer (died 2013).

== See also ==
- 1924 in Norway
- Music of Norway
