= 1960 in Nordic music =

The following is a list of notable events and compositions of the year 1960 in Nordic music.

== Events ==
- 12 March – The 5th Eurovision Song Contest is held in the UK. For the first time, three Scandinavian countries compete: Norway finish fourth, Denmark and Sweden (joint 10th).
- 15 March – Swedish tenor Jussi Björling has a heart attack while performing at Covent Garden, London, but insists on continuing.
- 20 March – Danish tenor Lauritz Melchior gives a special concert in Copenhagen to mark his 70th birthday.
- 20 August – Jussi Björling gives his final concert performance, in Stockholm.
- unknown date – Aulis Sallinen becomes administrator of the Finnish Radio Symphony Orchestra.

== New works ==
- Einojuhani Rautavaara – Symphony No. 3
- Hilding Rosenberg
  - Riflessioni no. 2 for string orchestra
  - Riflessioni no. 3 for string orchestra

== Popular music ==
- Erling Ágústsson – "Oft er fjör í Eyjum"
- Thøger Olesen & Vidar Sandbeck – "Heksedansen", performed by Raquel Rastenni
- Swe-Danes – "Scandinavian Shuffle"

== New recordings ==
- Per Asplin – Julekos (Christmas EP)
- Otto Brandenburg – This is Otto Brandenburg
- Dag Wirén / Bo Nilsson / Sven-Erik Bäck / Ingvar Lidholm – Ny Svensk Kammarmusik

== Film music ==
- Erik Nordgren – På en bänk i en park

== Births ==
- 9 January – Haukur Tómasson, Icelandic composer
- 28 April – Rolf Graf, Norwegian singer, guitarist, composer and record producer (died 2013)
- 29 April – Kari Kriikku, Finnish clarinetist
- 12 May – Lena Willemark, Swedish fiddler, singer and composer
- 1 October – Per Bergersen, Australian-born Norwegian singer-songwriter (died 1990)
- 29 October – Jens Winther, Danish jazz trumpeter (died 2011)

== Deaths ==
- 21 January – Launy Grøndahl, Danish conductor and composer (born 1886)
- 11 April – Zilas Görling, Swedish jazz saxophonist (born 1911)
- 8 May – Hugo Alfvén, Swedish violinist, conductor and composer (born 1872)
- 9 September – Jussi Björling, Swedish operatic tenor (born 1911)

== See also ==
- 1960 in Denmark
- 1960 in Iceland
- 1960 in Norwegian music
- 1960 in Sweden
