= Baker Hansen =

Norwegian family-owned bakery

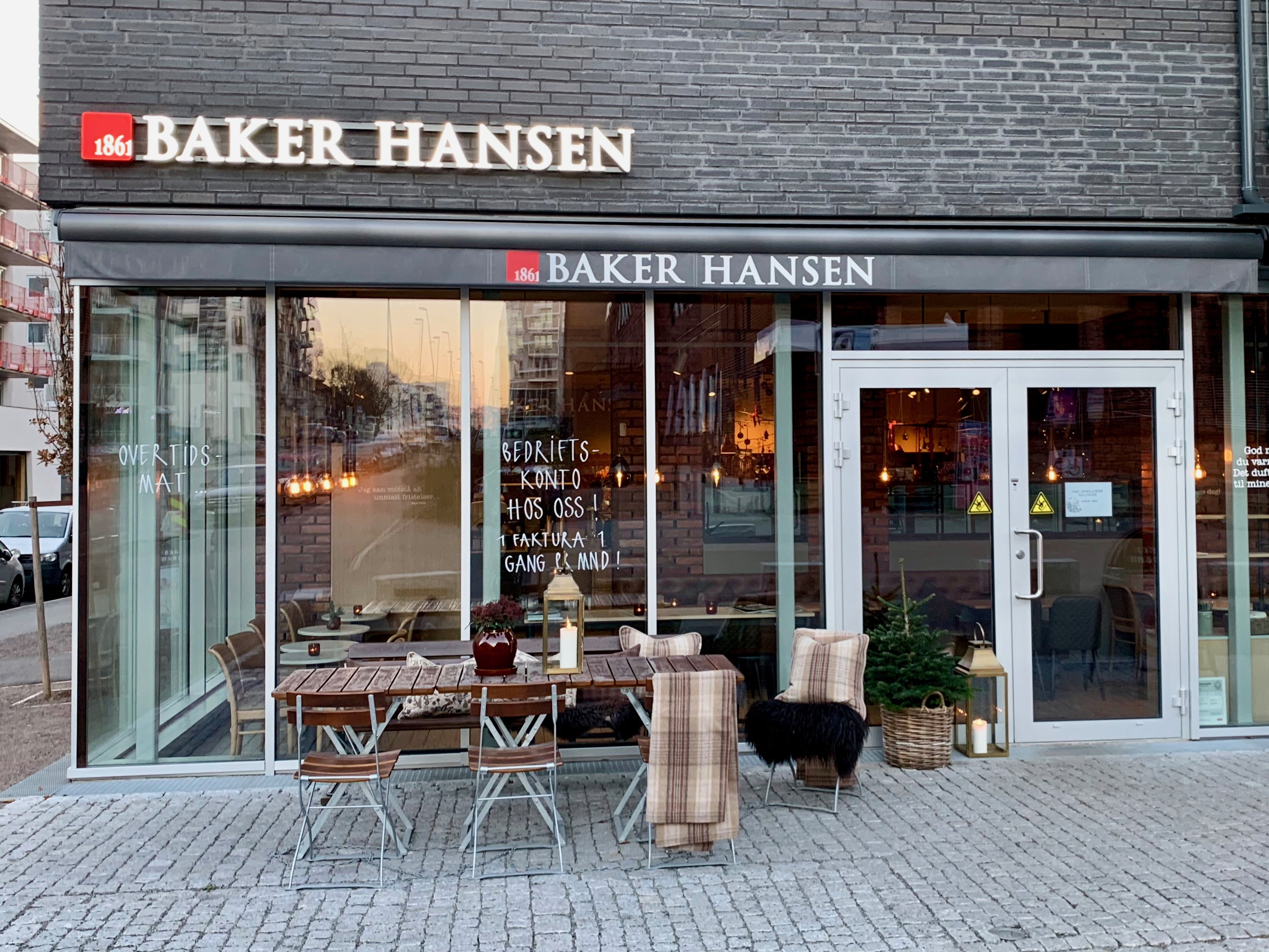
- Formerly: A. Hansen Bakeri
- Company type: Aksjeselskap
- Industry: Bakery
- Founded: 1861
- Founder: Arnt Hansen
- Headquarters: Bærum, Akershus, Norway
- Key people: Magnus Alexander Hals (managing director); Cathrine Alsaker (chair)
- Products: Bread, pastries, baked goods

Baker Hansen is a Norwegian family-owned bakery with outlets run on a franchise model in many places in the Oslo area. The bakery was founded in 1861 by the master baker Arnt Hansen as A. Hansen Bakeri. Baker Hansen introduced the Kneippbrød to Norway in 1895 and is the oldest continuously operating bakery company in Norway.

== History ==
Arnt Hansen was born in Kvikne but grew up in Verdal. He qualified as a journeyman from the bakers' guild in Trondheim, and from 1861 he was a master baker in Christiania (now Oslo), with a sales outlet at Jernbanetorget. The next outlet was in Raadhusgaten, and as the business expanded it took premises in Storgaten and Universitetsgaten as well.

=== German-Austrian influences ===
Arnt Hansen died in 1889, and his widow Thona Hansen, who had been central to building up and running the business, carried it on. Their son Haakon took over in 1892 after completing baker's training in Germany and Austria. Drawing on experience from Vienna among other places, Haakon developed Baker Hansen into a modern bakery, introducing German kneading and dough machines and water-tube ovens with pull-out carriages for loading and removing the bake. He shared his knowledge with competing bakers, who were able to come and learn modern machines and methods.

Baker Hansen also led the shift from white bread to wholemeal by launching the bread of the priest and naturopath Sebastian Kneipp, based on wholemeal flour, in Norway. The recipe was shared with other bakers, and the first industrial bakeries in Norway were Kneipp bakeries. Kneipp's original certificate and approval, signed by Dr. Kneipp on 21 December 1895, is still in Baker Hansen's possession.

Haakon Hansen was also a leading organizer in the bakery industry for many years, giving the largest bakeries in Bergen, Oslo, and other towns a common voice. He also organized fellow bakers in the purchasing and production of yeast, among other things, by founding Bagernes Gjær- og Spritfabrik in Moss.

=== Central bakery and a network of franchise branches ===
In 1913 the bakery moved from Pilestredet to Bogstadveien 54 by Valkyrie plass. In the postwar period a number of new outlets were established on the franchise model, which the third generation, Arnt Hansen, had come to know in Germany. Baker Hansen became the franchisor, providing the product range, logo and trademark, and a concept for premises, fittings, and clothing, while the operators of each branch, the franchisees, owned the operating company with their own share capital.

Baker Hansen kept to craft traditions and did not join the large industry mergers of the 1960s, which built big bread factories for mass production geared to the dominant grocery chains. Instead it made its central bakery more efficient, and from 2014 moved from Bogstadveien to Østerås Næringspark in Bærum, continuing to focus on its own distribution within its own branch network.

The concept for the outlets developed toward cafés, as these grew in Oslo from the 1990s, with "Italian" coffee, small baked goods, open sandwiches, and more seating. In 2024 there were 36 outlets in Oslo, Akershus, and Buskerud.
