= Lena Larsson (singer) =

Swedish ballad singer

Anna Karolina Larsson (14 June 1882 – 20 November 1967), generally known as "Lena" Larsson, was a Swedish ballad singer with a contralto voice.

She was born in Ytterby to Kristina Karlsson and her husband Karl August, who worked as farmers with a secondary income from fishing. Because of the need to help on the farm, Lena had little education, but her whole family were singers, and her younger brother recorded some of the lyrics of her songs and sent them to an archive. In 1935, aged 53, she married Gustaf Larsson, a smallholder, and moved to Gullö in the province of Bohuslän. After her husband's death in 1956, she continued to run his small farm and also brought up the children of one of her younger sisters, who had died.

In 1957, Lena Larsson made her first recordings, encouraged by Ulf Peder Olrog, who became the founder of Swedish Radio’s folk music collection. Over a period she recorded 250 ballads for Swedish radio. Along with fellow folk-singers Ulrika Lindholm and Svea Jansson, her voice was recorded for posterity between 1952 and 1963 and can be heard on commercially available recordings. Larsson's voice on the recordings is described as "dark and low, her tempo slow", and her performance as "meditative rather than extrovert". She performed at concerts, festivals, and on radio and television.

Larsson died on stage, aged 85, after suffering a heart attack during a performance.
