= Spring Song (Sibelius) =

Tone poem by Jean Sibelius

- Tone poem by Jean Sibelius
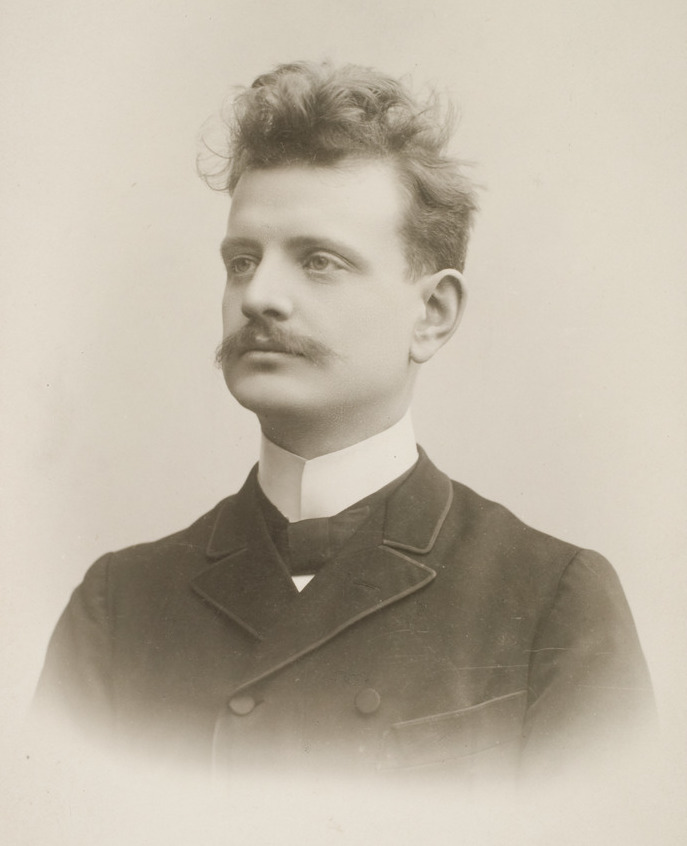
- The composer (c. 1895)
- Native name: Vårsång
- Opus: 16
- Composed: 1894, rev. 1895
- Publisher: Fazer & Westerlund (1903) (Note: On 20 July 1905, the Helsinki-based music publisher Fazer & Westerlund (Helsingfors Nya Musikhandel) sold its Sibelius holdings (the publishing rights and printing plates) to the German firm of Breitkopf & Härtel.)
- Duration: 8 mins. (orig. 10 mins.)

Premiere
- Date: 21 June 1894
- Location: Vaasa, Grand Duchy of Finland
- Conductor: Jean Sibelius
- Performers: Orchestra of the Song Festival

Spring Song (in Swedish: Vårsång; in Finnish: Kevätlaulu), Op. 16, is a single-movement tone poem for orchestra written in 1894 by the Finnish composer Jean Sibelius.

== History ==
The piece was initially composed as Improvisation for Orchestra, in the key of D major. It was premiered on 21 July 1894 at an outdoor festival in Vaasa, organized by the Society for Popular Education (Kansanvalistusseura). Short, lyrical, and delicately scored, Sibelius's piece was ill-suited for the open-air concert, and the audience received it less enthusiastically than another work on the program: Korsholm, by Sibelius's brother-in-law and friend Armas Järnefelt. Shortly therefore, Sibelius withdrew Improvisation for revision. In 1895, he recast it in F major and retitled the work Spring Song (Vårsång), appending the subtitle "The Sadness of Spring" to that (unpublished) version.

== Instrumentation ==
Spring Song is scored for the following instruments, organized by family (woodwinds, brass, percussion, and strings):

- 2 flutes (each doubling piccolo), 2 oboes, 2 clarinets (in B♭), and 2 bassoons
- 4 horns (in F), 3 trumpets (in F), 3 trombones, and tuba
- Timpani and tubular bells ("glocken")
- Violins (I and II), violas, cellos, and double basses

The piece contains an optimism that is relatively rare among Sibelius' works. It is known for its prominent use of tubular bells at the end of the song.

== Structure ==
Spring Song takes about 8 minutes to play.

Measures 5–12

== Discography ==
The sortable table below lists commercially available recordings of Spring Song:

No.	Conductor	Orchestra	Rec. (Note: Refers to the year in which the performers recorded the work; this may not be the same as the year in which the recording was first released to the general public.)	Time	Recording venue	Label	Ref.
1	Paavo Berglund	Bournemouth Symphony Orchestra	1973	8:21	Southampton Guildhall	EMI Classics	(Note: P. Berglund–EMI Classics (5 69773 2) 1997)
2	Sir Charles Groves	Royal Liverpool Philharmonic Orchestra	1975	6:56	Liverpool Philharmonic Hall	EMI Classics	(Note: C. Groves–EMI Classics (5 85532 2) 2003)
3	Sir Alexander Gibson	Royal Scottish National Orchestra	1977	7:10	Glasgow City Halls	Chandos	(Note: A. Gibson–Chandos (CHAN 8395/6) 1985)
4	Neeme Järvi (1)	Gothenburg Symphony Orchestra (1)	1986	8:17	Gothenburg Concert Hall	BIS	(Note: N. Järvi–BIS (CD–384) 1988)
5	Vassily Sinaisky	Moscow Philharmonic Orchestra	1991	8:19	Mosfilm Studios	Brilliant Classics	(Note: V. Sinaisky–Brilliant Classics (BC9212) 2010)
6	Neeme Järvi (2)	Gothenburg Symphony Orchestra (2)	1994	7:46	Gothenburg Concert Hall	Deutsche Grammophon	(Note: Neeme. Järvi–DG (00028947755227) yyyy)
7	Osmo Vänskä (1)	Lahti Symphony Orchestra (1)	1999	8:14	Ristinkirkko	BIS	(Note: O. Vänskä–BIS (CD–1125) 2000)
8	Shuntaro Sato	Kuopio Symphony Orchestra	2002	8:32	Kuopio Music Centre	Finlandia	(Note: S. Sato–Finlandia (0927–49598–2) 2003)
9	Osmo Vänskä (2)	Lahti Symphony Orchestra (2)	2007	7:34	Sibelius Hall	BIS	(Note: O. Vänskä–BIS (SACD–1645) 2009)
10	Leif Segerstam	Helsinki Philharmonic Orchestra	2007	8:56	Finlandia Hall	Ondine	(Note: L. Segerstam–Ondine (ODE 1112–2) 2007)
11	Edward Gardner	Bergen Philharmonic Orchestra	2018	7:45	Grieg Hall	Chandos	(Note: E. Gardner–Chandos (CHSA 5217) 2021)
12	Sakari Oramo	BBC Symphony Orchestra	2018	9:03	Watford Colosseum	Chandos	(Note: S. Oramo–Chandos (CHAN 20136) 2019)

== Notes, references, and sources ==
Notes

Sources

- Barnett, Andrew (2007). Sibelius. New Haven: Yale University Press. ISBN 978-0-300-11159-0.
- Dahlström, Fabian [in Swedish] (2003). Jean Sibelius: Thematisch-bibliographisches Verzeichnis seiner Werke [Jean Sibelius: A Thematic Bibliographic Index of His Works] (in German). Wiesbaden: Breitkopf & Härtel. ISBN 3-7651-0333-0.
- Tawaststjerna, Erik (2008) [1965/1967; trans. 1976]. Sibelius: Volume I, 1865–1905. Translated by Layton, Robert. London: Faber and Faber. ISBN 978-0-571-24772-1.
