= Marita Sølberg =

Norwegian soprano (born 1976)

Marita Kvarving Sølberg (born 22 March 1976) is a Norwegian soprano. She became a soloist with the Norwegian National Opera in 2008.

== Education ==
Sølberg studied at the "National College of Operatic Art" in Oslo and at the "Norwegian Academy of Music" in Oslo.

== Career ==
Sølberg has worked with Marc Minkowski, Zubin Mehta, Michel Plasson and other conductors. From 2006 to 2008 Solberg was a principal singer at the Staatsoper, Stuttgart. Other opera engagements include Gran Teatre del Liceu, Barcelona, Teatro Real, Madrid, Komische Oper, Berlin and the Norwegian National Opera.

=== Operatic roles ===
- Michaela in Carmen
- Pamina in Die Zauberflöte (2008, 2009)
- Servilia in La clemenza di Tito
- Title role in Zaide (2008)
- Zerlina in Don Giovanni
- Celia in Lucio Silla
- Gretel in Hänsel und Gretel (2008)
- Marzelline in Fidelio
- Charmion in Massenet's Cléopatre
- The angel in Messiaen's Saint François d'Assise.
- Bellezza in George Frideric Handel's Il Trionfo del tempo e del disinganno (Rinaldo Alessandrini.)

=== Orchestral and chamber music ===
- Gustav Mahler's Symphony No. 2 (Zubin Mehta).
- Una voce dal cielo from Don Carlo
- Wolfgang Amadeus Mozart, arias (Norwegian National Opera gala concert)
- Handel, Messiah, in Moscow (Peter Neumann)
- Felix Mendelssohn, Elijah, with Gothenburg Symphony Orchestra (Rafael Frühbeck de Burgos)

== Awards ==
In August 2001, Solberg won first prize at the Queen Sonja Singing Competition in Oslo. In July 2004, Solberg won third prize as well as the "International Media Jury Award" at the "International Hans Gabor Belvedere Singing Competition" in Vienna.

== Reception ==
A 2016 review in the American Record Guide said that Sølberg "displays a voluptuous and rich voice with a creamy tone that caresses the music and the listener".

== Discography ==
- Grieg - Peer Gynt (The Complete Incidental Music), BIS, (June, 2005)
- Grieg - Olav Trygvason / Orchestral Songs, 2006
