= Black Soul Choir (album) =

Studio album by Wolves Like Us
- Released: February 24, 2014
- Genre: Heavy Metal
- Label: Prosthetic

Wolves Like Us chronology
Late Love (2010)	Black Soul Choir (2014)

Professional ratings
Aggregate scores
Source	Rating
Metacritic	67/100
Review scores
Source	Rating
This Is Fake DIY	3/5 stars

Black Soul Choir is the second studio album by Norwegian heavy metal band Wolves Like Us. It was released in February 2014 under Prosthetic Records.

== Track list ==
No.	Title	Length
1.	"Days of Ignorance"
2.	"Three Poisons"
3.	"I Don't Need To Be Forgiven"
4.	"A Wish of Fools"
5.	"When Will We Ever Sleep"
6.	"Your Word is Law"
7.	"Dig With Your Hands"
8.	"Lovescared"
9.	"Under"
10.	"We Were Blood"
11.	"Thanatos Wins Again"
