= Leif Rustad =

Norwegian cellist and radio pioneer

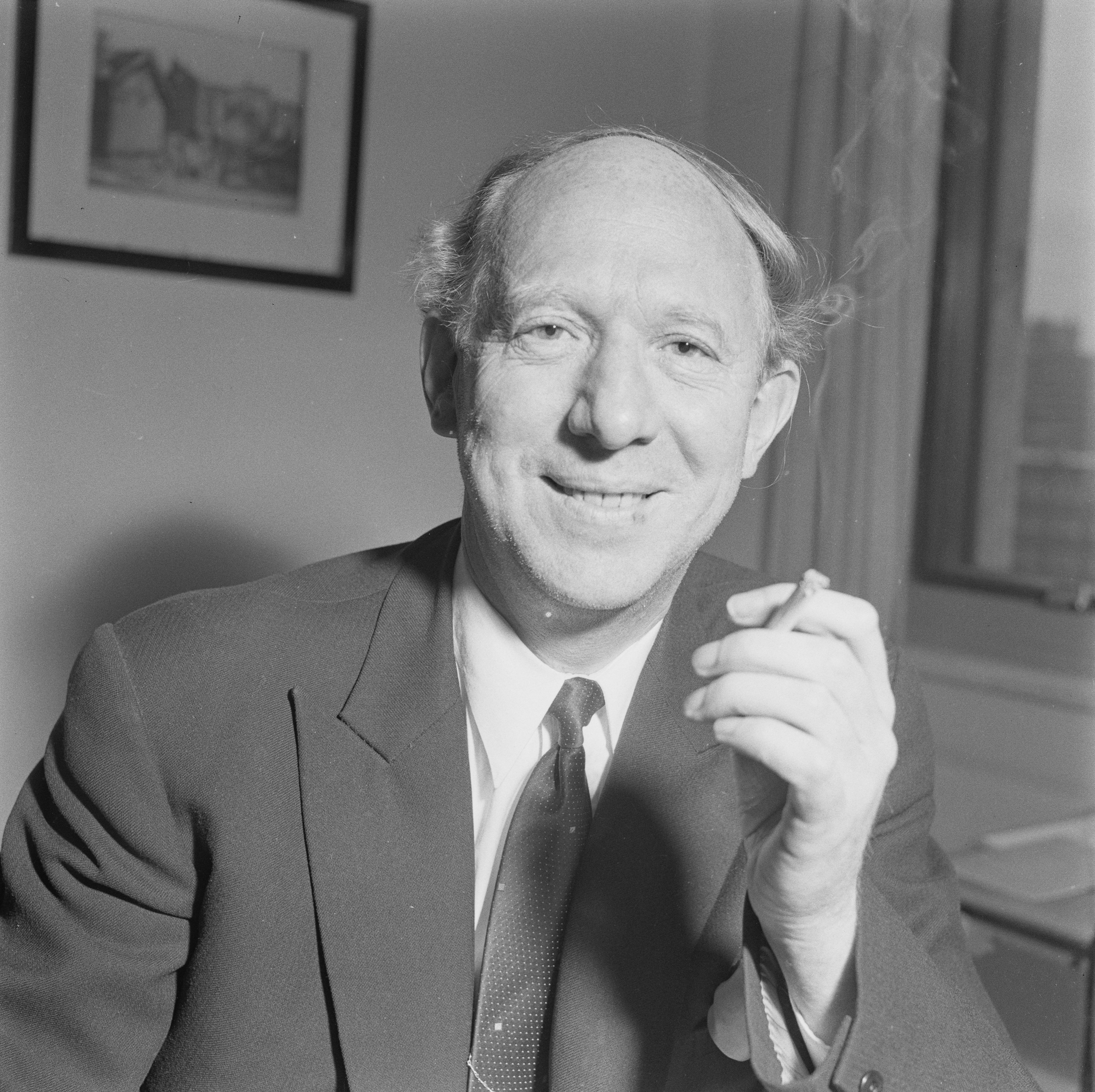
- Born: 30 October 1903; Kristiansand, Norway
- Died: 17 June 1976 (aged 72)
- Occupation(s): Cellist and radio pioneer
- Employer: NRK

Leif Rustad (30 October 1903 – 17 June 1976) was a Norwegian cellist and radio pioneer. He was born in Kristiansand. He was responsible for the music department in the early days of the Norwegian Broadcasting Corporation (NRK). From 1930 he was responsible for the development of NRK's record archive. He also served as a program presenter, and hosted several radio shows, including Rundtomkring, Store Studio and Hobbyklubben.
