= Marius Ulfrstad =

Norwegian composer

- Born: Marius Moaritz Ulfrstad; 11 September 1890
- Died: 29 October 1968 (aged 78)
- Era: Romantic

Marius Moaritz Ulfrstad (11 September 1890 – 29 October 1968) was a composer, organist and music teacher. His compositions were well known at his time, but are largely forgotten today.

== Biography ==
Ulfrstad was born in Ellingsøya, the son of teacher Mauritz Ulvestad (1858-1919) and Lisa Kvalstein (1861–97). After middle school exam and teacher education Ulfstad started at the Conservatory of Music in Kristiania and completed an organist examination there in 1911. In 1912 he settled in Ålesund as a singer and organist, but studied later composition in Germany, France, and Italy. In 1914 he became organist in Kragerø, and in 1917 he moved to Kristiania, where he worked as a music analyst, conductor, and music teacher.

Ulfrstad debuted as a composer in 1919, the same year as he was first married to the singer Ragnhild Albertha Hovde (1895-1978), the marriage was canceled in 1940. He started at the Music Academy in Kristiania in 1922, he was a board member of the Composer Association and a time chairman of the Young Tone Society. His work was part of the art competitions at the 1924 Summer Olympics and the 1928 Summer Olympics.

In 1943 Ulfstad was injured in a fire, which characterized him the rest of his life. Then in 1948 he married Solveig Emilie (“Molle”) Heidenreich Mehus (1910-1994), the marriage was canceled in 1952. He is registered with the last name Ulvestad in the census both in 1900 and 1910, so the change to Ulfrstad may have happened after this. The address book for Oslo in 1927 the name Ulfrstad is used. Ulfrstad received the Norwegian state artist's salary in 1936. He died in Oslo, where he is buried at Vestre gravlund.
