= Niels Marthinsen =

Danish composer

Niels Marthinsen (born 1963) is a Danish composer in the classical tradition. He studied composition at the Royal Academy of Music in Aarhus from 1982 to 1990 as a student of Per Nørgård. Other teachers include Hans Abrahamsen, Steen Pade, Karl Aage Rasmussen and Poul Ruders.

He received the Victor Borge Prize in 1993, the H. C. Lumbye Prize in 2008. The 2006 Danish National Opera production of Marthinsen's opera Skriftestolen received the Danish Reumert Prize in 2007 for Opera of the Year.

== List of works ==
- 1986 Erscheinungen (orchester)
- 1988 Airborne (flute, piano, violon, and cello)
- 1988 Echoes of a Dove
- 1988 Sept Poèsies des saisons japonaises
- 1989 Olé
- 1990 Vulcan's Forge
- 1990 Burst
- 1992 Rhapsodie Espagnole
- 1992 Cradle Song
- 1992 Concerto
- 1992 Wildlife
- 1992 Minotaurus
- 1992 Shadow Figures
- 1993 Den Forstenende Skov
- 1993 Abgesang
- 1993 Chimes at Midnight
- 1993 Heldenleben
- 1993 Panorama
- 1994 Columbus
- 1994 Bolero
- 1994 Cupid and Death
- 1994 Reveille
- 1994 Slagtøjskoncert
- 1994 Tubakoncert
- 1995 Devil in Disguise
- 1995 Strygekvartet
- 1995 En Miniature
- 1996 Symphony
- 1996 Lyriske stykker
- 1996 Angels and Insects
- 1996 Heroisk Etude
- 1996 A Bright Kind of High
- 1997 Love and Treachery
- 1997 Klavertrio
- 1997 Kærlighed og forræderi
- 1998 Moonwalk
- 1998 Byen og øjnene
- 1999 Canto alla secunda Giornata
- 1999 Introduction and Three Allegros
- 1999 Outland
- 2001 Maestro
- 2003 Et Familieselskab i Helsingør
- 2004 Skriftestolen - operatrailer i fire afsnit
- 2004 Monstersymfoni
- 2004 Maestrovariationer
- 2005 Den gamle vandrende Ridder
- 2006 Hul igennem
- 2006 Skriftestolen
- 2007 The Monkey
- 2007 The Poet
- 2008 Burning Fiery Furnace
- 2008 Syndfloden over Norderney
- 2009 Kongen af Himmelby - Demo
- 2009 Symfoni nr. 2 - Snapshot Symphony
- 2009 Frøen
- 2009 In the Shadow of the Bat
- 2009 Atlantis Revisited
- 2009 Kongen af Himmelby
