= Ludolf Nielsen =

Danish composer, violinist, conductor and pianist

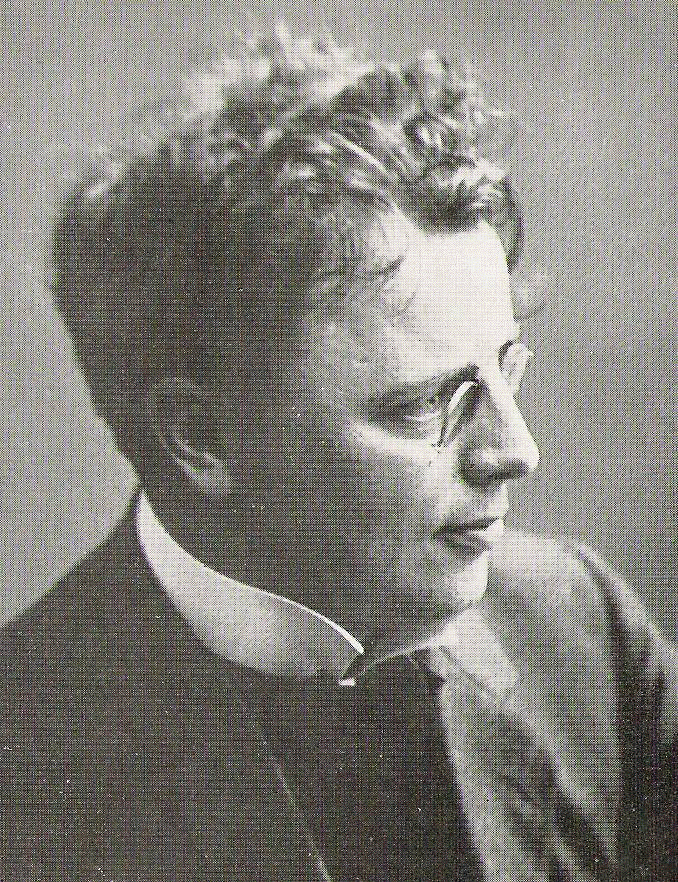
Photograph of Nielsen, taken before 1917

Karl Henrik Ludolf Nielsen (29 January 1876 – 16 October 1939) was a Danish composer, violinist, conductor, and pianist. Today he is considered one of the most important Danish composers of the early 1900s (together with the more famous Carl Nielsen).

== Life ==
Nielsen was born in Nørre Tvede, Denmark. Although his family lacked any musicians, Ludolf took to music at a very young age. After a few years of violin lessons from local fiddlers, at eight he was playing at local festivals and other country occasions. In his mid-teens, he moved to Copenhagen, which exposed him to a much broader musical milieu. At 19, he won a scholarship to the Danish Royal Academy of Music. There, he studied violin, piano, and music theory. His composing talents were apparently self-developed.

When about 20, Nielsen started composing, at the same time as Tivoli Orchestra hired him as a violinist. Some of his works were performed in 1899, but his first major success was with the symphonic poem Regnar Lodbrog, which gained him an additional scholarship that gave him the opportunity to spend time in the musically rich city of Leipzig, where he composed a few string quartets and had them published. He returned to Copenhagen and became conductor of the Tivoli Orchestra. In 1902, he composed his First Symphony, and the tone poem From the Mountains between 1903 and 1905. Just after his marriage in 1907, Nielsen composed a Romance for Violin (1908) and his Second Symphony (1907 – 1909).

Like many other artists, World War I had a very profound effect on Nielsen; He wrote little until 1914, which saw his Third Symphony. After the War, he became a private music teacher and eventually returned to composing. The two most important works from this period are his ballet Lackschmi (1922) and the orchestral suite Skovvandring (Forest Journey), along with almost 100 Lieder.

Between 1926 and 1939, Ludolf worked as a programmer for the Danish National Radio Corporation and, with the exception of a few radio plays, he ceased composing. On 16 October 1939, at the age of 63, Nielsen died in Copenhagen.

== Selected works ==
- Symphony No. 1 in B minor, Op. 3 (1903)
- String Quartet No. 2 in C minor, Op. 5 (1904)
- Berceuse for Violin and Strings, Op. 9 (1905)
- From the Mountains, Orchestral Suite, Op. 8 (1905)
- Concert Overture in C major, Op. 13 (1906)
- Romance for Violin and Orchestra, Op. 20 (1908)
- Symphony No. 2 in E major, Symphony of Joy (Glaedenssymfoni), Op. 19 (1909)
- Serenade for Solo Viola d'Amore in D major (1911)
- Symphony No. 3 in D major, Op. 32 (1914)
- The Tower of Babel, Cantata Op. 35 (1914)
- String Quartet No. 3 in C major, Op. 41 (1920)
- Forest Walk (Skovvandring), Symphonic Suite (1922)
- Lyric Nocturne for Violin and Orchestra, Op. 48 (1923)
- Hjortholm. Symphonic Poem, Op. 53 (1923)
