= Wolves Like Us =

Norwegian band

- Origin: Oslo, Norway
- Genres: rock, heavy metal
- Years active: 2010–2025
- Labels: Prosthetic Records, Pelagic Records
- Members: Lars Kristensen; Espen Helvig; Torgeir Kjeldaas; Jonas Thire
- Website: www.facebook.com/wolveslikeusss

Wolves Like Us was a Norwegian hard rock band from Oslo. Formed in 2010 they were signed to Prosthetic Records after only a few months, producing their first album Late Love in June 2011. Their second album, Black Soul Choir was released February 24, 2014.

== History ==
Formed in Oslo, Norway in 2010 the band members already had experience from previous music projects. Jonas Thire played in two bands previous to Wolves, JR Ewing in 2002 and Amulet a few years after. He met his fellow band members through Amulet, when they decided to postpone their side projects to work together on Wolves Like Us and give the music business another shot. They briefly mention a third band, Infidels Forever, in an interview but there is not much known about it.

Larsh mentions in one interview that despite being in a successful band, each member still has a normal day job. He works as a bartender, and the others do similar jobs to be able to pay the bills. Whatever money they make goes straight into funding another tour, or making another album. They are in the business of making music because it is something they love to do and they love their fans. Fellow labelmate Phil Labonte has a similar claim. In an interview he states that while his band, All That Remains, is markedly successful they do not make much money off it. They remain with it because they love to make music and they love their band, and their fans.

When the band had just gotten together they were discovered by Prosthetic Records. It was only their fourth or fifth show, and the scout from the record label was originally there to see another band. They signed to the label a few weeks later. They played in Fluff Fest in 2011, and a few summer festivals that Norway is known for.

=== Deathless ===
In 2012 Wolves Like Us released a 7" vinyl featuring two songs: "Deathless" on side A and "Burns Like a Paper Rose" on side B, which would later be the first track on their album Late Love. The vinyl is still being sold online.

=== Late Love ===
With the help of their label, Prosthetic Records, Wolves Like Us produced their first full-length studio album in June 2011. Under the Gun review describes it as a "sprawling success, with an imaginative and colourful sound" and that it deserves to reach a wide audience. They rated it an 8 out of 10.

The album itself goes from haunting and ominous to more of a straight rock sound. Wolves Like Us showcase their experience and their talent in putting together the album as a whole. Larsh says that the band is very happy with how the record turned out, and that they still genuinely enjoy playing the songs on the record. He goes on to say that as musicians they are always looking forward and focus on making the next record better.

=== Get Gone ===
In 2013 the band released a 10" vinyl with a brand new song called "Get Gone" on side A, and a cover of Quicksand's "Too Official" on side B. It was a limited edition release.

=== Black Soul Choir ===
In between their jobs and touring to promote their earlier releases, Wolves Like Us has been recording the start of their second studio album, Black Soul Choir. They have kept much of the information under wraps, but music reviewers who have heard it claim that it is a promising album, and that the boys have not lost their touch. The band teamed up with producer Mike Hartung and Propeller Studios in Oslo through the summer to work on it. Through the 11 songs it's described as having powerful vocals, major riffs, harmonious rhythms and booming percussion.

It was released worldwide on February 24, 2014 on CD, digital download, and vinyl.

=== Brittle Bones ===
The band's 3rd full length Brittle Bones was released on October 25, 2019, on Pelagic Records.

== Members ==
- Espen Helvig – guitar (2010–2025)
- Toy Kjeldaas – bass guitar (2010–2025)
- Lars Kristensen – vocals, guitar (2010–2025)
- Jonas Thire – drums (2010–2025)

== Discography ==
=== Releases ===
Title	Album details
Deathless	* Released: August 7, 2010: Label: Prosthetic Records; Formats: 7" Vinyl, digital download
Late Love	* Released: June 21, 2011: Label: Prosthetic Records; Formats: LP, CD, digital download
Get Gone	* Released: June 24, 2012: Label: Prosthetic Records; Formats: 10" vinyl
Black Soul Choir	* Released: February 2014: Label: Prosthetic Records; Formats: LP, CD, digital download
Brittle Bones	* Released: October 2019: Label: Pelagic Records; Formats: LP, digital download
