= Finn Viderø =

Danish organist

Finn Viderø (born Poulsen) (15 August 1906 – 13 March 1987) was a Danish organist, who was one of the first organists to become known outside the country, primarily due to his recordings of classic organ works.

Viderø was born in Fuglebjerg, Næstved. He was the organist at the Reformed Church in Copenhagen from 1928 to 1941, the Jægersborg Church from 1942 to 1947, the Trinitatis Church in Copenhagen from 1947 to 1971 and St. Andreas Church in Copenhagen from 1971 to 1977. He was guest lecturer at Yale University and held an honorary doctorate from the Åbo Akademi University in Finland. In 1933, he co-published with Oluf Ring a widely used organ primer. His organ playing was uncompromising and many believed that Viderø's musical interpretations were as close to the authentic, artistic and historical representation intended by the composer as one could get. He died in Copenhagen.
