= Siegfried Salomon =

Danish composer

Siegfried Salomon (3 August 1885 – 29 October 1962) was a Danish composer.

Salomon was born in Copenhagen. In 1899 he entered the Conservatory in Leipzig and studied there for four years. He also spent some time in Paris studying with Paul Le Flem. From 1903 he worked as an orchestral cellist and violist and appeared as a soloist in Copenhagen, Paris and Stockholm. His greatest success as a composer and conductor was with the opera Leonora Christina which premiered at Det Kongelige Teater in 1926. The opera was successful due to its use of popular style and the performance of the soprano Tenna Frederiksen Kraft in the title role. His output includes two other operas, Duen og slangen (Doves and Serpents; 1925) and Dronning Dagmar (Queen Dagmar; 1928). Among his other works is a Violin Concerto in g, opus 26 from 1916, a cello concerto in D minor, and a piano concerto in A minor. He died in his native city of Copenhagen.

== Sources ==
- Danish Violin Concertos Vol 3 Danacord 465-466 Kai Laursen, Violin
- Torben Schousboe. The New Grove Dictionary of Opera, edited by Stanley Sadie (1992), ISBN 0-333-73432-7 and ISBN 1-56159-228-5
- The Oxford Dictionary of Opera, by John Warrack and Ewan West (1992), ISBN 0-19-869164-5
