= 1969 in Norwegian music =

The following is a list of notable events and releases of the year 1969 in Norwegian music.

== Events ==
=== May ===
- The 17th Bergen International Festival started in Bergen, Norway.

=== June ===
- 19 – The 6th Kongsberg Jazz Festival started in Kongsberg, Norway (June 27 – July 1).

=== July ===
- The 9th Moldejazz started in Molde, Norway.

== Albums released ==
=== Unknown date ===
G

Jan Garbarek

- Esoteric Circle (ECM Records), with Terje Rypdal, Arild Andersen and Jon Christensen

K

Karin Krog

- Open Space (MPS Records), the Down Beat Poll Winners in Europe

V

Jan Erik Vold

- Briskeby Blues (Philips Records), with Jan Garbarek Quartet

== Deaths ==
January

- 24 – Pauline Hall, writer, music critic, and composer (born 1890).

April

- 11 – Ludvig Irgens-Jensen, twentieth-century composer (born 1894).

August

- 9 – Reidar Bøe, singer and composer (born 1921).

December

- 11 – Jens Gunderssen, pianist and music teacher (born 1912).
- 24 – Mary Barratt Due, pianist and music teacher (born 1888).

== Births ==
February

- 3
  - Berit Cardas, violinist.
  - Bjørg Lewis, cellist.
- 4 – Sven Erik Kristiansen, black metal singer, guitarist, and bassist
- 12 – Anneli Drecker, singer, songwriter, and actress
- 18 – Bent Sæther, bass guitarist and lead vocalist (Motorpsycho).
- 22 – Ståle Storløkken, jazz keyboardist and composer.

March

- 6 – Aslag Guttormsgaard, musician, screenwriter and actor.

April

- 23 – Trude Eick, French hornist and composer.
- 29 – Thomas Winther Andersen, jazz bassist and composer.

May

- 6 – Mathilde Grooss Viddal, saxophonist, clarinetist, and composer.
- 12 – Erlend Skomsvoll, jazz pianist, band leader, composer, and music arranger.

June

- 21 – Håkon Gebhardt, drummer, multi-instrumentalist, and record producer (Motorpsycho).

July

- 7 – Svein Olav Herstad, jazz pianist and composer (Funky Butt).
- 14 – Arvid Solvang, guitarist, songwriter, and record producer.

August

- 8 – Øyonn Groven Myhren, traditional folk musician and composer.
- 18 – Susanne Lundeng, traditional folk fiddler and composer.
- 25
  - Olga Konkova, jazz pianist and composer.
  - Øyvind Brække, jazz trombonist, composer, music arranger, and band leader (Bodega Band).

October

- 7 – Per Mathisen, jazz bassist and composer.
- 8 – Gulleiv Wee, bassist (The September When).
- 9 – Lene Grenager, contemporary composer and cellist.

November

- 25 – Kim Ofstad, drummer and composer (D'Sound).
- 29 – Lars Håvard Haugen, guitarist and songwriter (Hellbillies).

December

- 31 – Hans Magnus Ryan, prog-rock guitarist and vocalist (Motorpsycho).

== See also ==
- 1969 in Norway
- Music of Norway
- Norway in the Eurovision Song Contest 1969
