= Reinhold Svensson =

Swedish composer

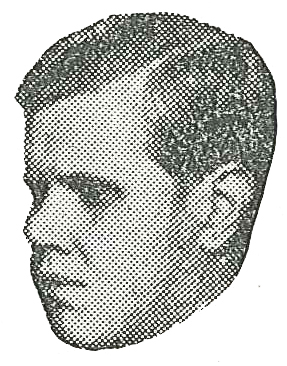
Reinhold Svensson

Reinhold Svensson (20 December 1919 – 23 November 1968) was a Swedish jazz pianist, Hammond organist and composer.

Svensson was born in Husum, Sweden. He recorded as a solo artist in 1941-1942, then joined the ensemble of violinist Hasse Kahn. In 1948, Putte Wickman took leadership of the group, and Svensson worked with it until 1960 as a performer, arranger, and composer.

Svensson appeared at the Paris Jazz Festival in 1949, worked with Arne Domnerus's orchestra, and played with Charlie Norman in 1950-1951 as a duo under the names Ralph & Bert Berg and the Olson Brothers. He also recorded with his own ensembles (including under the name Ragtime Reinhold); Domnerus, Jack Noren, Simon Brehm, and Thore Jederby were sidemen of his in the late 1940s and early 1950s. He died in Stockholm.
