= Dan Fog =

Danish music antiquarian and publisher

Dan Fog (11 August 1919 – 31 August 2000) was a Danish music antiquarian and publisher who is remembered principally for his Danish music catalogues and biographies of Scandinavian composers.

After matriculating from Ordrup School in 1937 where he specialized in modern languages, Fog trained as an antiquarian bookseller while studying musicology at the Royal Danish Academy of Music. He also took organ lessons with Søren Sørensen. In 1953, he acquired the publishing and antiquarian business which had been founded by Knud Larsen in 1906 (Knud Larsens Musikforlag og Musikantikvariat). He published comprehensive catalogues of the works of Danish composers, including Peter Heise, Carl Nielsen, Niels Gade, A.P. Berggreen, C.E.F. Weyse, J.P.E. Hartmann and H.C. Lumbye.
