= Sigvaldi Kaldalóns =

Icelandic composer and doctor (1881–1946)

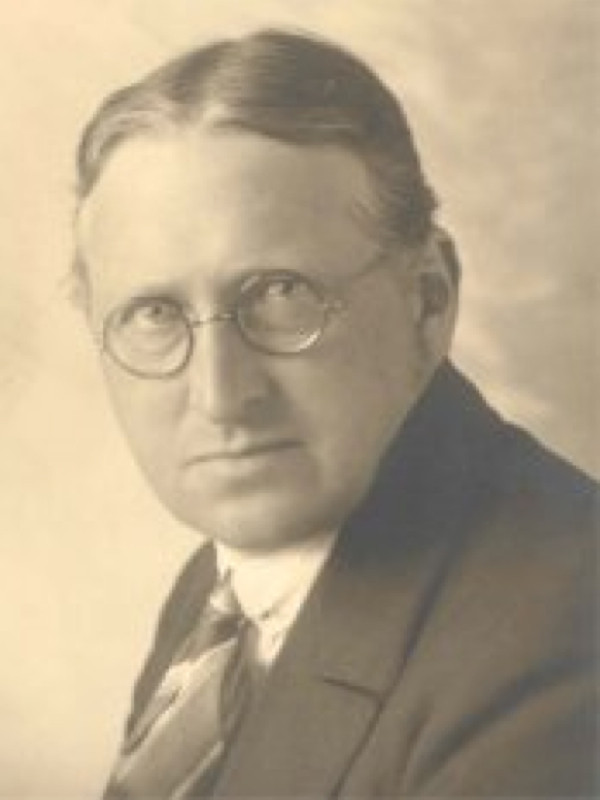
Sigvaldi Kaldalóns

Sigvaldi Kaldalóns (Stefánsson) (13 January 1881 – 28 July 1946) was an Icelandic composer and doctor. Unlike the avant-garde composers of his day, he wrote in a traditional romantic style and composed many of Iceland's most famous and widely performed songs, many of which are now wrongly assumed to be folk songs. His particular skill was in capturing the spirit of poems in his melodies, making him Iceland's foremost lyric composer. Since the end of 2016, his works have entered the public domain in Iceland.

== Life ==
He was born in Garðastræti, Vaktarabær in the Grjóti neighbourhood of Reykjavík, the son of Stefán Egilsson, a mason, and Sesselja Sigvaldadóttir, a midwife. He attended the Reykjavík Latin School, matriculating in 1902 and gained a diploma in medicine in 1908 from the medical school in Reykjavík. He then travelled to Denmark, where he graduated in Copenhagen. On 16 September 1909 he married Karen Margrethe Thomsen (née Mengel), a Danish nurse.

== Works ==
Kaldalóns wrote about 350 songs. Among his best-known compositions are:

- Ave María, to a poem by Indriði Einarsson (instrumental performance by Víkingur Ólafsson available on YouTube)
- Ísland ögrum skorið (Iceland Deeply Carved) to a poem by Eggert Ólafsson (performance available on YouTube)
- Á Sprengisandi (Ride Hard Across the Sands) to a poem by Grímur Thomsen (performance available on YouTube)
- Suðurnesjamenn (performance available on YouTube)
- Svanasöngur á heiði (performance available on YouTube)
- Heimir (performance available on YouTube)
- Erla, góða Erla
- Draumur hjarðsveinsins
- Þú eina hjartans yndið mitt
- Ég lít í anda liðna tíð
