= 2006 in Nordic music =

The following is a list of notable events and releases that happened in Nordic music in 2006.

== Events ==
- 13–15 January – The inaugural Ice Music Festival is held in Geilo, Norway.
- 25 March – Christofer Johnsson leaves Swedish extreme metal band Demonoid; the band replaces him with Emperor Magus Caligula of Dark Funeral.
- 7 April – On the first day of Norway's Vossajazz festival, Yngve Moe receives the Vossajazzprisen.
- 8 April – On the second day of Vossajazz 2006, Trygve Seim performs the commissioned work Reiser.
- 12 May – Drummer Martin Lopez leaves Swedish progressive metal band Opeth, and Martin Axenrot is hired as his replacement.
- 20 May – The Eurovision Song Contest, held in Athens, is won by Finland, with the song "Hard Rock Hallelujah" performed by Lordi. It is the country's first ever win at Eurovision.
- 1 December – The second MGP Nordic is held in Sweden. Denmark emerge winners with the song "Tro på os to", performed by SEB.
- 25 November – Markus Fagervall wins Sweden's third series of Idol.
- 11 December – The Nobel Peace Prize Concert is held in Oslo. Featured artists include Morten Abel, Renée Fleming and Lionel Richie.

== Classical works ==
- Birgitte Alsted – Dance with Bells
- Victoria Borisova-Ollas – Open Ground
- Ulf Grahn – Concerto for Piano and Orchestra
- Ilkka Kuusisto – Vapauden vanki (opera)
- Magnus Lindberg – Violin Concerto No. 1
- Per Nørgård – 7th Symphony
- Kaija Saariaho
  - Adriana Mater (opera)
  - La Passion de Simone (oratorio)
  - Notes on Light

== Major hit singles ==
- Basshunter – "Boten Anna" (#1 Denmark and Sweden, #3 Norway, #4 Finland)
- Aleksander Denstad With – "A Little Too Perfect" (#1 Norway)
- Markus Fagervall – "Everything Changes" (#1 Sweden)
- Marit Larsen – "Don't Save Me" (#1 Norway)
- Lordi – "Hard Rock Hallelujah" (#1 Finland, #8 Norway, #9 Sweden)
- Veronica Maggio – "Nöjd?" (#6 Sweden)
- Nylon – ""Losing A Friend" (#1 Iceland)
- Sonata Arctica – "Replica 2006" (#1 Finland)
- Ola Svensson – "Brothers" (#4 Sweden)

== Eurovision Song Contest ==
- Denmark in the Eurovision Song Contest 2006
- Finland in the Eurovision Song Contest 2006
- Iceland in the Eurovision Song Contest 2006
- Norway in the Eurovision Song Contest 2006
- Sweden in the Eurovision Song Contest 2006

== Deaths ==
- 20 January – Dave Lepard, singer-songwriter and guitarist (born 1980; suicide)
- 14 February – Putte Wickman, Swedish jazz musician (born 1924)
- 13 March – Arne Dørumsgaard, Norwegian composer, poet and record collector (born 1921)
- 24 April – Erik Bergman, Finnish composer (born 1911)
- 16 August – Jon Nödtveidt, Swedish rock vocalist (born 1975; suicide)
- 3 September – Eva Knardahl, Norwegian pianist (born 1927)
- 4 September – Astrid Varnay, Swedish operatic soprano (born 1918)
- 28 September – Jan Werner Danielsen, Norwegian singer (born 1976; heart failure)
- 24 December – Kenneth Sivertsen, Norwegian guitarist and composer, (born 1961; complications from epilepsy)
