= 1853 in music =

== Events ==
- March 5 – The American-German piano company Steinway & Sons is founded by Heinrich Engelhard Steinweg.
- October – Louis Niedermeyer reorganizes and re-opens the choristers' school known as the École Choron, which becomes the École Niedermeyer de Paris.
- October 1 – The piano manufacturer C. Bechstein Pianofortefabrik is founded by Carl Bechstein in Berlin.
- October 22 – The overture to Tannhäuser is performed in Boston Music Hall by the Germania Musical Society conducted by Carl Bergmann. It is the first American performance.
- November 1 – Richard Wagner begins composing the music for The Ring of the Nibelung.
- Louis Moreau Gottschalk returns to the United States after eleven years in Europe.
- The 20-year-old Brahms meets Joseph Joachim and Robert and Clara Schumann. Robert Schumann writes an article in the October 28 Neue Zeitschrift für Musik titled "Neue Bahnen" ("New Paths"), hailing Brahms as a musical genius "called to give expression to his times in ideal fashion".
- Julius Blüthner founds Blüthner (piano manufacturer) in Leipzig, Germany.

== Published popular music ==
- Danmarks gamle Folkeviser collected by Svend Grundtvig
- "Farewell My Lilly Dear" by Stephen Foster
- "My Cottage Home" w.m. Alice Hawthorne
- "My Old Kentucky Home" by Stephen Foster
- "P'tit quinquin" (in Picard) by Alexandre Desrousseaux
- "The Yellow Rose of Texas"

== Classical music ==
- Franz Berwald
  - Piano Trio No. 4 in C major
  - Piano Quintet No. 1 in C minor
- Johannes Brahms – Piano Sonata No. 1, Piano Sonata No. 3
- Ida Henriette da Fonseca
  - Der Abschied
  - Byrons Statue
  - Die Erwartung
  - Granen ved Lougen
  - Regnbuen
  - Wechsellied zum Tanze
  - Zum neuen Jahr
- William Henry Fry – Santa Claus, Christmas Symphony
- Louis Moreau Gottschalk – The Banjo, Op. 15
- Charles Gounod – Méditation sur le Premier Prélude de Piano de S. Bach, later known as Ave Maria (Bach/Gounod)
- Franz Liszt
  - Piano Sonata in B minor
  - Hungarian Rhapsodies 1–15
  - Ballade No. 2
- Camille Saint-Saëns
  - Piano Quartet in E major
  - Symphony No. 1 in E♭ major
- Robert Schumann - Gesänge der Frühe
- Robert Schumann, Johannes Brahms and Albert Dietrich – F-A-E Sonata
- Henryk Wieniawski – Violin Concerto No. 1

== Opera ==
- Victor Massé – Les noces de Jeannette
- Karel Miry – Anne Mie (opera in 1 act, premiered on October 9 in Antwerp)
- Giuseppe Verdi
  - Il trovatore (premiered on January 19 at Teatro Apollo in Rome)
  - La traviata (premiered on March 6 at La Fenice in Venice)

== Births ==
- February 3 – Maria Westberg, ballerina (d. 1893)
- April 5 – Alfonso Rendano, pianist (d. 1931)
- May 17 – Carolina Östberg, opera singer (d. 1929)
- July 24 – Alessandro Parisotti, composer and music editor (d. 1913)
- November 23 – Giuseppina Bozzachi, ballerina (d. 1870)
- December 22 – Teresa Carreño, pianist, singer, conductor and composer (d. 1917)
- December 30 – André Messager, composer (d. 1929)

== Deaths ==
- January 16 – Matteo Carcassi, guitarist and composer (b. 1792)
- March 15 – Giovanni Ricordi, violinist (b. 1785)
- October 3 – George Onslow, composer (b. 1784)
- October 29 – Pierre-Joseph-Guillaume Zimmermann, pianist, composer and music teacher (b. 1785)
- October 30 – Pietro Raimondi, composer (b. 1786)
- December 5
  - Johann Peter Heuschkel, oboist, organist and composer (b. 1773)
  - Jeanette Wässelius, operatic soprano
- date unknown – James Hill, folk musician (b. c. 1811)
