= 1912 in Nordic music =

The following is a list of notable events and compositions of the year 1912 in Nordic music.

== Events ==
- 28 February – Carl Nielsen conducts the première of his Symphony No. 3 (the Sinfonia espansiva) and his Violin Concerto in Copenhagen. The soloist in the Violin Concerto is Peder Møller, for whom it was written.
- 3 July – The Savonlinna Opera Festival is founded by Aino Ackté in Finland.
- unknown date
  - Swedish composer Helmer Alexandersson writes the inauguration music for the Olympic Games in Stockholm.
  - Hanna Hallberg-Norlind becomes director of the South Swedish music conservatory.

== New works ==
- Hugo Alfvén – Incidental music for a production of Plautus's Mostellaria, for solo flute
- Erkki Melartin – Aino (opera)
- Ture Rangström – Suite in modo antico, for violin and piano
- Jean Sibelius – The Bells of Kallio Church

== Popular music ==
- Fridolf Lundberg & Kalle i Dalen – "Flickorna i Småland"
- Göran Svenning and David Hellström – "Beväringsvals från Backamo"

== Births ==
- 1 January – Svein Øvergaard, Norwegian jazz saxophonist and percussionist (died 1986)
- 6 January – Johnny Bode, Swedish singer, composer and fraudster (died 1983)
- 23 April – Veikko Lavi, Finnish singer, songwriter and writer (died 1996)
- 19 May – Jens Gunderssen, Norwegian singer, songwriter, actor, producer, and theatre director (died 1969)
- 21 May – Lille Bror Söderlundh, Swedish composer and singer (died 1957)
- 6 June – Robert Levin, Norwegian pianist and composer (died 1996).
- 27 September – Tauno Marttinen, Finnish composer (died 2008)
- 26 November – Gunnar Sønstevold, Norwegian pianist and composer (died 1991).
- 12 December – Thorbjørn Egner, Norwegian actress, children's writer, songwriter, playwright and illustrator (died 1990)
- 29 December – Thore Ehrling, Swedish jazz trumpeter, bandleader and composer (died 1994)

== Deaths ==
- 17 January – Karen Holmsen, Norwegian opera singer (born 1832)
- 12 June – Carl David af Wirsén, Swedish poet, secretary of the Swedish Academy, member of The Hymn Book committee of the Church of Sweden
- 28 December – Ola Mosafinn, Norwegian hardingfele fiddler and composer (born 1828)

== See also ==
- 1912 in Denmark
- 1912 in Norwegian music
- 1912 in Sweden
