= 1909 in Nordic music =

The following is a list of notable events and compositions of the year 1909 in Nordic music.

== Events ==
- 23 January – The first performance of Jean Sibelius's Night Ride and Sunrise takes place in St Petersburg, and reception is hostile.
- 13 February – Sibelius conducts a performance of Finlandia at the Queen's Hall in London, UK.
- unknown date – Composer Armas Järnefelt becomes a Swedish citizen.

== New works ==
- Hugo Alfvén – Wedding March
- Kurt Atterberg – Scherzo and Adagio for string quartet
- Erkki Melartin – Lyrik I, Op.59
- Carl Nielsen – De unges Sang, CNW 291
- Jean Sibelius – String Quartet in D minor (Voces intimae)
- Christian Sinding – Serenade No. 2, Op. 92

== Popular music ==
- Jean Sibelius – "Giv mig ej glans, ej guld, ej prakt" ("Julvisa"), setting of lyric by Zacharias Topelius

== Births ==
- 11 January – Gunnar Berg, Swiss-born Danish composer (died 1989)
- 10 February – Peter L. Rypdal, Norwegian fiddler and traditional folk music composer (died 1988)
- 21 March – Miff Görling, Swedish bandleader, trombonist, arranger, and composer (died 1988)
- 14 October – Kalervo Tuukkanen, Finnish composer (died 1979)
- 18 October – Jan Wølner, Norwegian classical pianist (died 1991).
- 18 November – Valdemar Söderholm, Swedish composer (died 1980)
- 15 December – Randi Heide Steen, Norwegian operatic soprano (died 1990)
- 20 December – Vagn Holmboe, Danish composer and teacher (died 1996)

== Deaths ==
- 7 May – Joachim Andersen, Danish flautist, conductor and composer (born 1847)
- 19 July – Leopold Rosenfeld, Danish composer and singing teacher (born 1849)
- 22 July – Oscar Byström Swedish composer (born 1821)
- 10 November – Ludvig Schytte, Danish composer, pianist and teacher (born 1848)
- 4 December – Christian Teilman, Norwegian organist, pianist, and composer (born 1843)

== See also ==
- 1909 in Denmark
- 1909 in Norwegian music
- 1909 in Sweden
