= 1988 in Nordic music =

The following is a list of notable events and releases that happened in Nordic music in 1988.

== Events ==
- 25–27 March – At the 15th Vossajazz festival, Ole Thomsen's commissioned work, "Usynlige danser", is premièred, with Nina Seim and other musicians.
- 28 April – Ulf Grahn's Encore for Piano is premièred in Washington, D.C., USA, with Ingrid Lindgren as soloist.
- 30 April – At the 33rd Eurovision Song Contest, Denmark is the most successful of the Scandinavian countries, finishing third. Norway comes fifth, Sweden 12th, Iceland 16th and Finland 20th.
- November – Elisabeth Andreasson releases Älskar, älskar ej, her first solo album after the breakup of Bobbysocks.
- unknown date – Per Yngve Ohlin and Jan Axel Blomberg join Norwegian band Mayhem.

== Classical works ==
- Vagn Holmboe – Symphony No. 12, M. 338
- Frederik Magle – We Are Afraid (Vi er bange), cantata for choir and chamber orchestra
- Carin Malmlöf-Forssling – String Quartet No. 1, "Silverkvartetten"
- Per Nørgård – Orfeus: Den uendelige sang (opera)
- Kaija Saariaho – Petals for cello and electronics
- Bent Sørensen
  - Angels' Music for string quartet
  - Camelot by Night for bass flute and guitar
  - La Notte for piano and orchestra
  - Minnewater

== Hit singles ==
- A-ha – "Stay on These Roads" (#1 Denmark, Italy, Norway)
- Eppu Normaali – "Afrikka, sarvikuonojen maa"
- Karoline Krüger – "For vår jord" (#8 France under English title)
- Roxette – "Dressed for Success" (#2 Sweden; #3 Australia)
- Sanne Salomonsen – "Den jeg elsker" (#1 Denmark, Sweden)
- Sleepy Sleepers – "Nykäsen Matti" (#1 Finland)
- Triad – "Tänd ett ljus" (#1 Sweden)

== Eurovision Song Contest ==
- Denmark in the Eurovision Song Contest 1988
- Finland in the Eurovision Song Contest 1988
- Iceland in the Eurovision Song Contest 1988
- Norway in the Eurovision Song Contest 1988
- Sweden in the Eurovision Song Contest 1988

== Births ==
- 28 July – Cecilia Damström, Finnish composer

== Deaths ==
- 9 January – Peter L. Rypdal, Norwegian fiddler and traditional folk music composer (born 1909)
- 24 February – Miff Görling, Swedish bandleader, trombonist, arranger, and composer (born 1909)
- 30 March – Taneli Kuusisto, Finnish composer (born 1905)
- 3 April – Kai Ewans, Danish jazz musician (born 1906)
- 1 July – Robert Riefling, Norwegian classical pianist and teacher (born 1911).
- 6 August – Håkan Parkman, Swedish composer, arranger and choral director, 33 (drowned)
- 20 October – Mogens Wöldike, Danish conductor (born 1897)
- 8 December – Thore Swanerud, Swedish jazz pianist, vibraphonist, arranger, conductor, and composer (born 1919)
