= 1989 in Nordic music =

The following is a list of notable events and releases that happened in Nordic music in 1989.

== Events ==
- February – Yngwie Malmsteen plays several dates in Leningrad. A live recording is released later in the year as Trial by Fire: Live in Leningrad.
- 6 May – At the final of the 34th Eurovision Song Contest in Switzerland, Denmark is the most successful of the Scandinavian countries, finishing third. Sweden finish fourth, with Finland 7th, Norway 17th and Iceland in 22nd place.
- 4 July – Ulf Grahn's Fantasia for organ (composed in 1982) receives its first public performance, at Leksand Church, with Rolf Eriksson as the soloist.
- 20 September Icelandic band the Sugarcubes release their second studio album Here Today, Tomorrow Next Week!, which eventually reaches number 15 on the UK Albums Chart and number one on the UK Indie Albums chart.
- unknown date – Swedish band Dark Tranquillity is formed in Gothenburg.

== Classical works ==
- Anders Eliasson – Sinfonia concertante: Symphony No. 3 for Alto-Saxophone and Orchestra
- Einar Englund – Wind Quintet
- Einojuhani Rautavaara – Piano Concerto No. 2
- Jan Sandström – Motorbike Odyssey

== Film and TV scores ==
- Ragnar Bjerkreim – Kamilla and the Thief II

== Hit singles ==
- MC Einar – "Jul det' cool" (#1 Denmark)
- Kim Lönnholm – "Minä olen muistanut"
- Birthe Kjær – "Vi maler byen rød"
- Tommy Nilsson – "En dag" (#3 Sweden)
- Rob'n'Raz & Leila K – "Got to Get" (#1 Iceland; #8 UK)
- Roxette – "The Look" (#1 Denmark, Finland, Norway, Netherlands, Germany)
- Stone – "Back to the Stone Age" (#1 Finland)
- Magnus Uggla – "Jag mår illa" (#1 Sweden; #9 Norway)

== Eurovision Song Contest ==
- Denmark in the Eurovision Song Contest 1989
- Finland in the Eurovision Song Contest 1989
- Iceland in the Eurovision Song Contest 1989
- Norway in the Eurovision Song Contest 1989
- Sweden in the Eurovision Song Contest 1989

== Births ==
- 8 September – Avicii, Swedish DJ, remixer, and record producer (died 2018)

== Deaths ==
- 29 April – Else Schøtt, Danish operatic soprano (born 1895)
- 23 July – Martti Talvela, Finnish operatic bass (born 1935; heart attack)
- 5 August – Valter Aamodt, Norwegian composer and music critic (born 1902)
- 25 August – Gunnar Berg, Swiss-born Danish composer (born 1909)
- 31 August – Conrad Baden, Norwegian organist, composer, music educator, and music critic (born 1908)
- 28 December – Fred Lange-Nielsen, jazz bassist and vocalist (born 1919)
