= 1904 in Nordic music =

The following is a list of notable events and releases of the year 1904 in Nordic music.

== Events ==
- 24 April – Pikku pyhimys (translation of Hervé's Mam'zelle Nitouche), starring Aino Haverinen, is the first operetta to be performed in the Finnish language, in Viipuri.
- 10 May – Hugo Alfven's Swedish Rhapsody for orchestra, Midsommervaka, is premiered in Stockholm.
- December – Adolf Østbye, a Norwegian revue artist, becomes the first musician to make a gramophone record in Norway.
- unknown date – Finnish soprano Alma Fohström (probably) makes her only known recording.

== New works ==
- Hakon Børresen – Concerto for Violin and Orchestra in G major
- Armas Järnefelt – Berceuse (Kehtolaulu)
- Johan Halvorsen – Fossegrimen, Op. 21
- Carl Nielsen – Søvnen, Op.18
- Jean Sibelius
  - Cassazione
  - Violin Concerto, Op. 47

== Births ==
- 1 February – Lea Piltti, Finnish operatic soprano (died 1982)
- 7 September
  - Ernst Glaser, Norwegian violinist, orchestra conductor, and music teacher (died 1979)
  - Ragnar Steen, Norwegian guitarist (died 1958).
- 11 September – Hans Jacob Højgaard, Faroese composer (died 1992)
- 26 October – Torbjørn Knutsen, Norwegian composer and violinist (died 1987).

== Deaths ==
- 15 January – Eduard Lassen, Danish-born composer and conductor (born 1830)
- 18 March – Carl Johan Frydensberg, Danish composer (born 1835)
- 22 March – Julius Günther, Swedish opera singer and choirmaster (born 1818)
- 29 May – Maria Paulina Åhman, Swedish harpist (born 1812)
- 30 September – Sigurd Lie, Norwegian violinist, composer, and orchestra conductor (born 1871)
- 6 December – Johan Bartholdy, Danish composer (born 1853)

== See also ==
- 1904 in Norway
- 1904 in Sweden
