= 1990 in Nordic music =

The following is a list of notable events and releases that happened in Nordic music in 1990.

== Events ==
- 6 April – Knut Kristiansen is awarded the festival prize at Norway's annual Vossa Jazz festival.
- 5 May – In the final of the 35th Eurovision Song Contest, held in Zagreb, Iceland finish in fourth place to become the most successful of the Scandinavian countries. Denmark finish 8th, Sweden 16th and Finland and Norway joint 21st.
- unknown date – Guitarists Dan Nilsson & Micke Bargstörm, bassists Martin Persson and drummer Rille Even, all original members of Opeth, leave the band, after Mikael Åkerfeldt is recruited without their knowledge.

== Classical works ==
- Kaija Saariaho – ...à la Fumée
- Aulis Sallinen – Symphony No. 6, "From a New Zealand Diary"
- Jan Sandström – Det är en ros utsprungen
- Haukur Tómasson – Offspring

== Film and TV scores ==
- Frans Bak – Lad Isbjørnene Danse
- Kjartan Kristiansen – Døden på Oslo S

== Hit singles ==
- a-ha – "Crying in the Rain" (#1 Norway; #13 UK)
- Bubber – "Bubbers Badekar" (#1 Denmark)
- Anders Glenmark – "Hon sa" (#9 Sweden)
- Kim Larsen & Bellami – "Tarzan Mamma Mia" (#1 Denmark)
- Eppu Normaali – "Sydän tyhjää lyö" (#1 Finland)
- Lili & Susie – "What's the Colour of Love?" (#3 Sweden)
- Roxette – "It Must Have Been Love" (#1 Australia, Canada, Denmark, Norway, Spain, Switzerland)
- The Sugarcubes – "Planet"

== Eurovision Song Contest ==
- Denmark in the Eurovision Song Contest 1990
- Finland in the Eurovision Song Contest 1990
- Iceland in the Eurovision Song Contest 1990
- Norway in the Eurovision Song Contest 1990
- Sweden in the Eurovision Song Contest 1990

== Births ==
- 27 April – Robin Bengtsson, Swedish singer
- 29 October – Eric Saade, Swedish singer-songwriter

== Deaths ==
- 2 February – Sigbjørn Bernhoft Osa, Norwegian Hardanger fiddler and folk musician (born 1910)
- 27 February – Arthur Österwall, Swedish jazz band leader, composer, vocalist, and upright bassist (born 1910)
- 18 May – Eje Thelin, Swedish jazz trombonist (born 1938)
- 28 June – Per Bergersen, Norwegian songwriter and illustrator (born 1960; shot)
- 15 August – Ingrid Lang-Fagerström, Swedish harpist (born 1897)
- 18 August – Grethe Ingmann, Danish singer (born 1938)
- 6 October – Asser Fagerström, Finnish jazz pianist, composer, and actor (born 1912)
- 12 November – Randi Heide Steen, Norwegian operatic soprano (born 1909)
- 24 December – Thorbjørn Egner, Norwegian playwright, songwriter and illustrator (born 1912)
- 29 December – Aulikki Rautawaara, Finnish operatic soprano (born 1906)
