= 1910 in Nordic music =

The following is a list of notable events and compositions of the year 1910 in Nordic music.

== Events ==
- January – Carl Nielsen attends the funeral of 30-year-old artist Oluf Hartmann, for which he writes At the Bier of a Young Artist.
- unknown date – Jean Sibelius revises his 1902 cantata The Origin of Fire.

== New works ==
- Johan Amberg – Fantasiestücke, Op.12
- Erkki Melartin
  - Nocturne, Op. 64 No. 1
  - String Quartet No. 4
  - Traumgesicht
- Oskar Merikanto – Kappaleet, Op. 73
- Carl Nielsen
  - Hagbarth og Signe
  - Paaske-Liljen (choral work)
- Jean Sibelius
  - In Memoriam, Op. 59
  - The Dryad

== Popular music ==
- Alice Tegnér – "Sankt Hans"

== Births ==
- 3 May – Sigbjørn Bernhoft Osa, Norwegian Hardanger fiddler and folk musician (died 1910)
- 24 May – Nils-Eric Fougstedt, Finnish conductor and composer (died 1961)
- 26 April – Erland von Koch, Swedish composer (died 2009)
- 14 August – Konsta Jylhä, Finnish folk fiddler (died 1984)
- 27 August – Erkki Aaltonen, Finnish composer (died 1990)
- 14 September – Lasse Dahlquist, Swedish singer, songwriter and actor (died 1970)
- 12 October – Brita Bratland, Norwegian folk singer (died 1975)
- 14 November – Jens Book-Jenssen, Norwegian singer and songwriter (died 1999)

== Deaths ==
- 18 February – Johanna Sundberg, Swedish ballerina (born 1828)
- 29 March – Fritz Andersen, Danish pianist, organist and composer (born 1829)

== See also ==
- 1910 in Denmark
- 1910 in Norwegian music
- 1910 in Sweden
