= 1906 in Nordic music =

The following is a list of notable events and releases of the year 1906 in Nordic music.

== Events ==
- 11 November – Carl Nielsen's opera Maskarade, with a libretto by Vilhelm Andersen, is given its first performance at the Royal Danish Theatre, Copenhagen.
- 3 December – Hugo Alfvén's Symphony no. 3 in E major is performed for the first time in Gothenburg by the Gothenburg Orchestral Society, with the composer conducting.
- 6 December – The Oscarsteatern, one of Stockholm's premier private theatres, opens with a Swedish-language production of Jacques Offenbach's operetta Frihetsbröderna (Les brigands).
- 29 December – Jean Sibelius's symphonic tone poem Pohjola's Daughter is given its première in Saint Petersburg, with the composer conducting.
- unknown date – Sara Wennerberg-Reuter begins a 40-year tenure as organist at Sofia Church in Stockholm.

== New works ==
- Hugo Alfvén – Fosterlandspsalm
- Edvard Grieg – 4 Psalms, Op. 74
- Erkki Melartin – Surullinen Puutarha, Op.52
- Carl Nielsen
  - String Quartet No. 4 Op 44
  - Maskarade, CNW 2
  - Hr. Oluf han rider, CNW 7
  - Fædrelandssang, CNW 288
- Jean Sibelius
  - Pohjola's Daughter
  - Belshazzar's Feast
- Emil Sjögren – Böndir skulu kluckara fa

== Popular music ==
- "Krummavísa" (first published; passed down by folklorist Olafur Davidsson)

== Births ==
- 21 January – Gunnar Johansen, Danish pianist and composer (died 1991)
- 2 May – Aulikki Rautawaara, Finnish operatic soprano (died 1990)
- 19 July – Klaus Egge, Norwegian composer and music critic (died 1979)
- 1 September – Aksel Schiøtz, Danish lieder singer (died 1975)
- 10 October – Leo Mathisen, Danish jazz musician, singer and bandleader (died 1969)

== Deaths ==
- 22 March – Martin Wegelius, Finnish composer and musicologist (born 1846)
- 8 June – C. F. E. Horneman, Danish conductor, composer and music publisher (born 1840)
- 16 November – Wilhelmina Josephson, Swedish pianist (born 1816)

== See also ==
- 1906 in Denmark
- 1906 in Norwegian music
- 1906 in Sweden
