= 1928 in Nordic music =

The following is a list of notable events and compositions of the year 1928 in Nordic music.

== Events ==
- June – Kurt Atterberg's Sixth Symphony wins the 1928 International Columbia Graphophone Competition, sponsored by the Columbia Graphophone Company, and is one of the first major classical works to be premiered on record.
- 14 September – Carl Nielsen's Clarinet Concerto is given its first performance.

== New works ==
- Uuno Klami
  - Karelian Rhapsody
  - Symphonie enfantine
- Lars-Erik Larsson – Symphony No. 1
- Oskar Lindberg – Advent Hymn
- Carl Nielsen – Tre Klaverstykker (only two were performed in 1928)

== Popular music ==
- Valdemar Dalquist & Sten Njurling – Sista man på skansen"
- Eino Kettunen – "Ievan polkka" (traditional Finnish polka tune)

== Film music ==
- Music by Edvard Grieg is used, uncredited, in the score of an American film, The Viking.

== Births ==
- 29 January – Bengt Hambraeus, Swedish-born organist, composer and musicologist (died 2000)
- 14 April – Egil Monn-Iversen, Norwegian pianist and composer (died 2017)
- 4 May – Lars Gullin, Swedish saxophonist (died 1976)
- 14 July – Ole Schmidt, Danish conductor and composer (died 2010)
- 10 August – Per Asplin, Norwegian pianist, singer, composer and actor (died 1996).
- 3 October – Erik Bruhn, Danish dancer and choreographer (died 1986)
- 9 October – Einojuhani Rautavaara, Finnish composer (died 2016)
- 25 November – Alf Andersen, Norwegian flautist (died 1962).

== Deaths ==
- 1 March – Jacob Adolf Hägg, Swedish composer (born 1850)
- 13 March – Valborg Aulin, Swedish pianist and composer (born 1860)
- 8 April – Ludvig Holm, Danish violinist and composer (born 1858)
- 17 June – Torgrim Castberg, Norwegian violinist (born 1874)
- 7 July – Jón Laxdal, Icelandic composer (born 1865)
- 13 September – Olena Falkman, Swedish contralto (born 1849)

== See also ==
- 1928 in Denmark
- 1928 in Iceland
- 1928 in Norwegian music
- 1928 in Sweden
