= 1996 in Nordic music =

The following is a list of notable events and releases that happened in Nordic music in 1996.

== Events ==
- 29 March – On the first day of Norway's Vossajazz festival, Terje Isungset is awarded the festival prize.
- April – Swedish band Rednex feature on the German charity single "Children", as part of the supergroup "Hand in Hand for Children".
- 18 May – The annual Eurovision Song Contest is held in Oslo, Norway, at the Oslo Spektrum. Norway is the best-performing of the Scandinavian countries, finishing second; Sweden finishes third with "Den vilda", performed by the band One More Time. Iceland, represented by Anna Mjöll, finishes in 10th place, Finland 22nd, and Denmark 25th.
- 27 July – Swedish drummer Adrian Erlandsson and guitarist Patrik Jensen form the band The Haunted.

== Classical works ==
- Torstein Aagaard-Nilsen – Trumpet Concerto No. 2
- Frederik Magle – Christmas cantata: A newborn child, before eternity, God!
- Per Nørgård – Nuit des Hommes (opera)

== Hit singles ==
- Henrik Åberg – "Du är alltid en del utav mej" (#28 Sweden)
- Apulanta – "Anna mulle piiskaa" (#1 Finland)
- Aqua – "Roses Are Red" (#1 Denmark; #2 Norway; #5 Sweden)
- Jumper – "När hela världen står utanför" (#12 Sweden)
- Anna Mjöll – "Sjúbídú"
- One More Time – "Den vilda" (#7 Sweden)
- Trine Rein
  - "Just Missed the Train" (#4 Norway)
  - "Torn" (#10 Norway)
- Whigfield – "Sexy Eyes" (#4 Spain; #6 Australia)

== Eurovision Song Contest ==
- Denmark in the Eurovision Song Contest 1996
- Finland in the Eurovision Song Contest 1996
- Iceland in the Eurovision Song Contest 1996
- Norway in the Eurovision Song Contest 1996
- Sweden in the Eurovision Song Contest 1996

== Film and television music ==
- Morten Olsen – Portland

== Births ==
- 29 January – Nora Foss al-Jabri, Norwegian singer
- 15 June – Aurora, Norwegian singer
- 10 October – Oscar Zia, Swedish singer-songwriter
- 1 November – Line, Danish singer

== Deaths ==
- 23 February – Birgit Brüel, Danish singer and actress (born 1927)
- 14 March – Maj Sønstevold, Swedish composer (born 1917)
- 22 May – Veikko Lavi, Finnish singer, songwriter and writer (born 1912)
- 5 June – Anne-Marie Ørbeck, Norwegian pianist and composer (born 1911)
- 1 September – Vagn Holmboe, Danish composer (born 1909)
- 16 September – Rolf Graae, Danish church architect and designer of organs (born 1916)
- 2 October – Joonas Kokkonen, Finnish composer (born 1921)
- 9 October – Per Asplin, Norwegian pianist, singer, composer and actor (born 1928)
- 29 October – Robert Levin, Norwegian classical pianist and composer (born 1912)
