= Heteka =

Brand name for a steel-framed bed

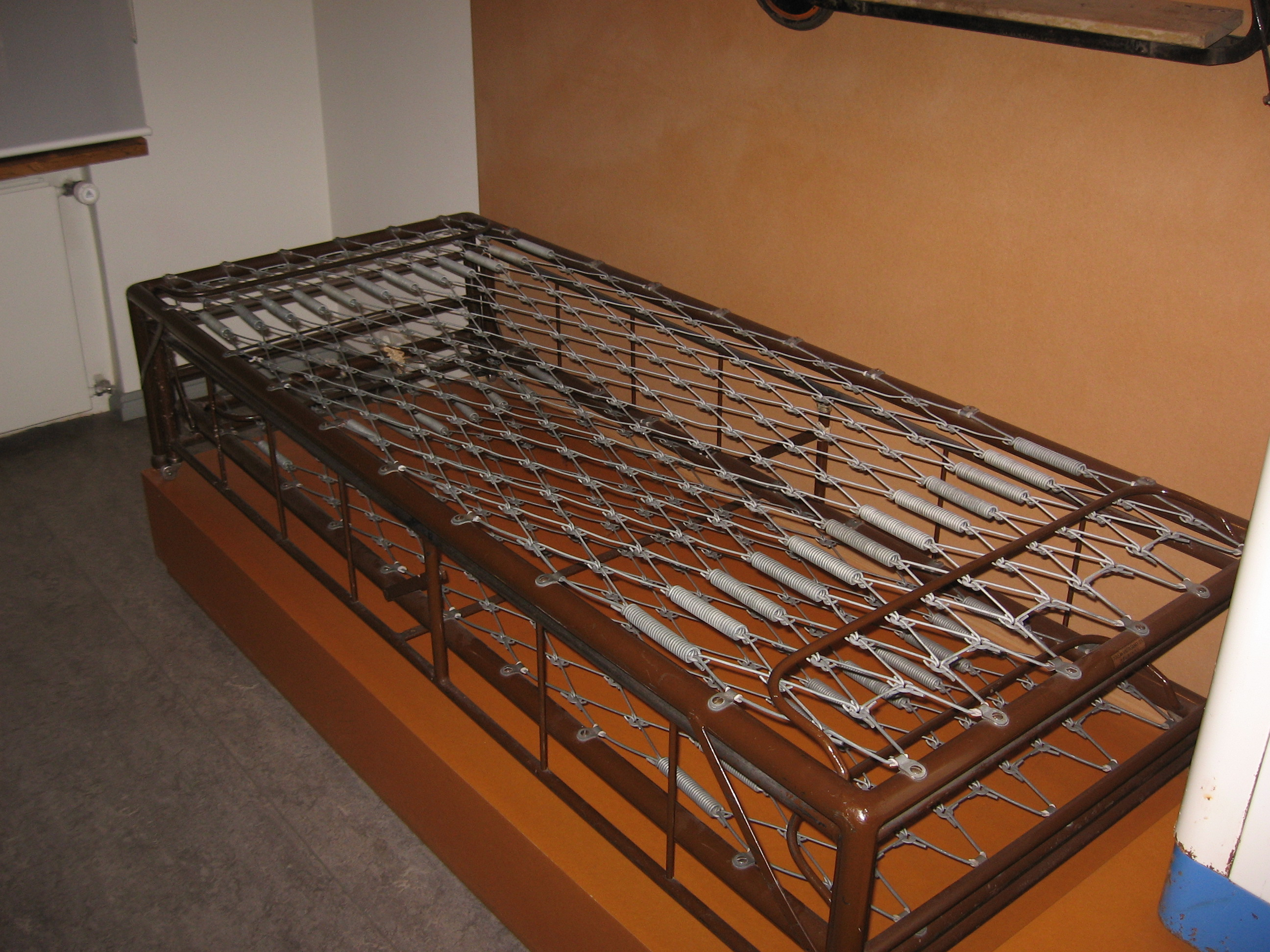
A Heteka bed on display at the National Museum of Finland

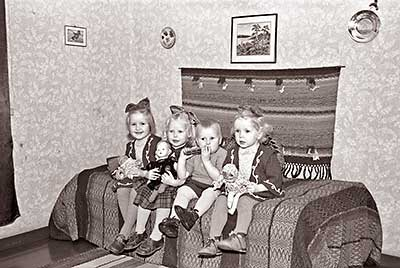
Children sitting on a Heteka bed in the 1950s

Heteka is a Finnish brand name for a steel-framed bed with springs. The name comes from the company Helsingin Teräshuonekalutehdas ("Helsinki Steel Furniture Factory") founded by Kalle Kärkkäinen, which started producing Heteka beds in 1932. Production of Heteka beds has been discontinued, but contrary to popular belief the name "Heteka" still remains a registered trademark. Before the Winter War there were six factories in Finland producing double couchette beds of iron, of which Helsingin Teräshuonekalutehdas fared the best.

A Heteka bed consists of two beds inside each other, of which the inner one can be pulled out from under the outer one. The beds have a steel pipe frame and a metal lattice bottom, and the inner bed usually has small wheels. The bottom of the inner bed is lifted up at nighttime, producing another bed. At daytime the bottom is put back down and the bed with its linens is pushed back inside the outer bed. Covered in bedcovers, the Heteka bed now becomes a couch to sit on, without a back rest or arm rests.

Heteka was advertised as repelling bed bugs, because bed bugs and other pests which thrived in old wooden beds could not nestle in beds made of a steel frame.

Ihannevuoteessa on nyt

12 JALKAA!
PÄIVÄ- JA YÖJALAT ERIKSEEN!
Heteka 37:n sisäsänky on päivisin ja siirrettäessä pyöräjaloillaan. Yöllä se pysyy vankasti paikoillaan tärinää eristävillä ja lattiaa säästävillä kumitulppajaloillaan. Sen vuode voidaan jo aamulla sijata, yöjaloille nostettaessa se nousee normaalikorkeudelle.
Yläsängyn toinen reunaputki on taivutettu alaspäin, niin että se ei paina sängyn laidalla istuttaessa. – Kierukkajoustinpohjat ovat äärimmäisen lujia ja äänettömiä. Runko ja jalat paksua, umpisaumaista teräsputkea.

The ideal bed now has

12 LEGS!
SEPARATE LEGS FOR DAY AND NIGHT TIME!
The inner bed of the Heteka 37 can be moved on its wheeled legs at daytime. At nighttime it stays firmly put on its rubber-footed legs that isolate tremors and spare the floor from damage. Its bed can be made already in the morning, by lifting it onto its night legs it rises to normal height.
One of the edge pipes on the upper bed has been bent downwards, so that it does not press into you when sitting on the edge of the bed. - The spiral spring bottoms are extremely strong and silent. The frame and the legs are made of thick, welded steel pipe. (From a Heteka advertisement from the late 1930s)

Heteka enjoyed great success from the 1930s to the 1950s. A total of two million beds were produced before Helsingin Teräshuonekalutehdas was discontinued in 1964, and nearly every Finnish home had a Heteka bed. In smaller homes, which lacked a separate bedroom, a Heteka bed usually functioned as a couch at daytime and was spread out to form a double bed in the evening.

At first Heteka beds used a spiral spring bottom made of small-twisted steel wire, which was as silent as the advertisements promised. The legs of the outer bed were also silenced with rubber feet. Later, apparently for cost reasons during wartime, the bottom was changed to a sparse wire lattice, which creaked noisily especially in older beds. Continual sleeping caused the lattice bottom to become warped and lose its shape. Back doctors were critical of worn-out Heteka beds and advised patients to fix them with plywood plates. Some models even lost the rubber feet, causing the legs to scratch the floor. During wartime even the steel frame was sometimes replaced with a wooden one.

== In popular culture ==
The Heteka bed has left its mark in Finnish popular culture. It has inspired several schlager and pop music songs: "Serenadi hetekalle" by Veikko Lavi (1978) and "Vanha heteka" by Kunto Korlin (1992); "Rottinkihetekka" (a slight misspelling of the trademarked name) by the band Ilona (1987) can also be counted. The Heteka is also mentioned in Juha Vainio's song "Eräänlainen sotaveteraani": "Mä oon vain yksinäinen sotaveteraani, eikä kukaan lämmitä mun hetekaani" ("I am just a lonely war veteran, and no one is warming my Heteka bed"). Pekka Ruuska's song "Matalassa majassa" contains the verse: "On hetekan syli niin hellä, se mua kannattaa kainosti kitisten - on kuin lepäisi höyhenellä." ("The embrace of the Heteka bed is so gentle, it supports me creaking modestly - it's as if I were resting on a feather.") Reino Palmroth, known as "Palle", sang: "Vaikk' näyttää että yhdelle, se antaakin unen kahdelle. Ihme tavaton tuo hetekamme on." ("Although it looks like it seats only one, it gives sleep to two. Such a miracle is our Heteka bed.") Before the time of wellie wanging and wife-carrying humorous sports in Finland included Heteka bed pushing and Heteka bed pulling (more specifically, pulling the inner wheeled Heteka bed).
