= Wilhelmine Holmboe-Schenström =

Norwegian singer (1842–1938)

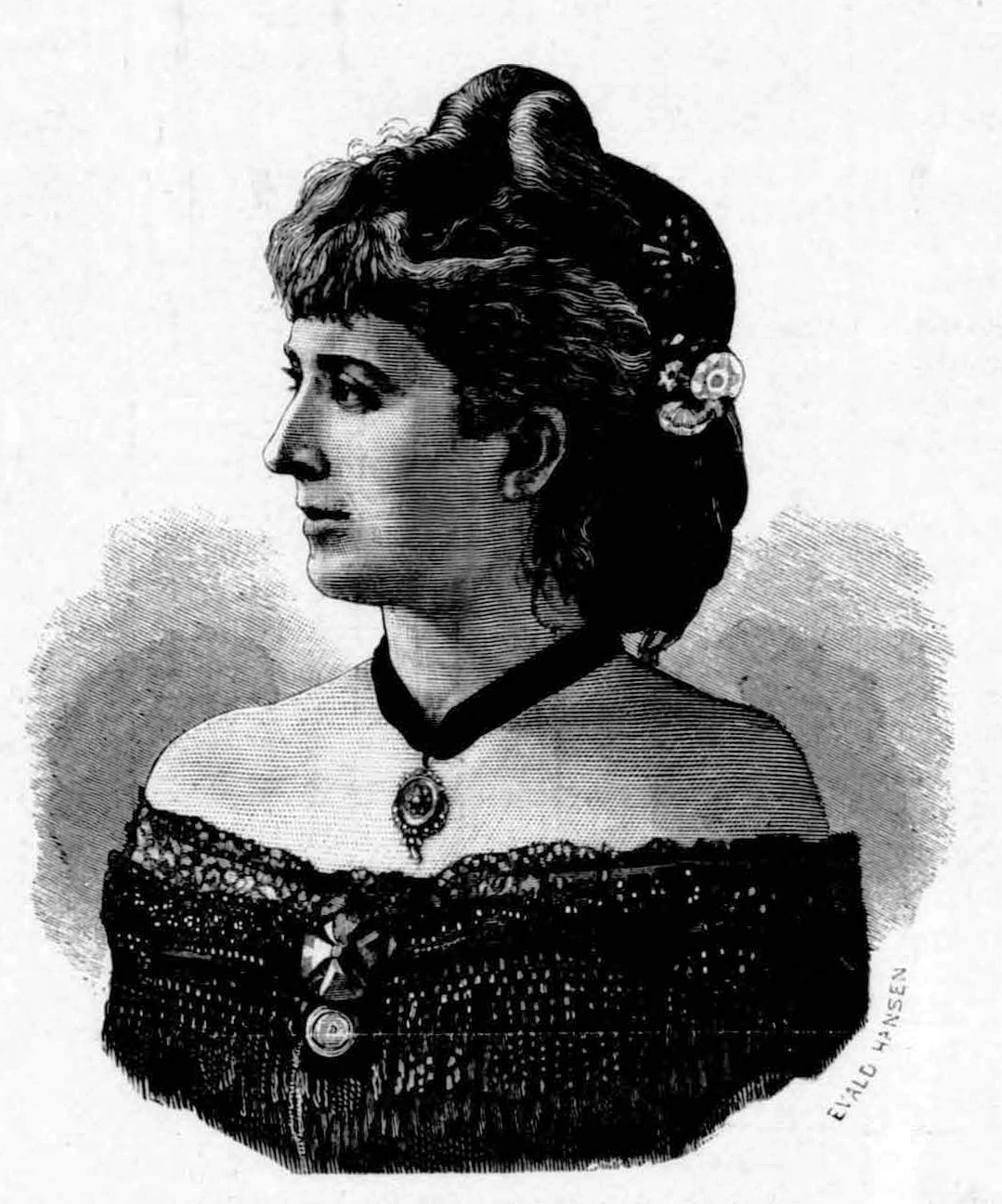
- Wilhelmine Holmboe-Schenström (1884)
- Born: Sara Wilhelmine Holmboe; 15 June 1842; Ålesund, Sweden-Norway
- Died: 18 November 1938 (aged 96); Oslo, Norway
- Other names: L'Hombino
- Occupations: Operatic mezzo-soprano; Voice teacher

Sara Wilhelmine Holmboe-Schenström, also known by the stage name Wilhelmine L'Hombino (15 June 1842 – 18 November 1938) was a Norwegian mezzo-soprano concert singer who later sang in opera. She has been described by opera historian Maud Hurum as one of the first women in the country to gain international recognition for her singing, alongside Karen Holmsen and Gina Oselio. After appearing in a concert in Oslo in 1872, she gave recitals in Germany, France, England and Scandinavia. She went on to perform in operas in Sweden and in continental Europe, including a three-year engagement in Italy. After her marriage in 1880, she became a voice teacher in Oslo and Sweden.

== Early life and education ==
Born on 15 June 1842 in Ålesund, Sara Wilhelmine Holmboe was the daughter of the judge Joakim Gotsche Holmboe (1796–1876) and his wife Anne Johanne née Johansdatter (1801–1887). She was one of the family's nine children. Such was her interest in music that shortly after her confirmation, she began to study in Oslo (then known as Christiania) under the organist Rudolph Magnus Forwald and took piano lessons under Halfdan Kjerulf. She continued her education in Paris, first under François Wartel, then under the mezzo-soprano Pauline Viardot.

== Career ==
Under the guidance and accompaniment of the pianist Erika Nissen, Holmboe first appeared at a concert in Oslo where she sang an aria from Mozart's Le nozze di Figaro, receiving enthusiastic acclaim from the audience. After a recital of her own in Halle, Saxony, she went on to give over 50 concerts in Scandinavia and the rest of Europe.

Her parents had intended her to become a concert performer but she persuaded them to cover the cost of her training as an opera singer. As a result, she moved to Paris where she studied under the French tenor Gustave-Hippolyte Roger. She made her operatic debut in Liège in Verdi's Un ballo in maschera. She then appeared as Azucena in Il trovatore, and as Léonor in Donizetti's La favorite. For all three roles, she was complimented by the critics for both her acting and her singing.

Despite some reports that she performed at the Royal Swedish Opera, contemporary accounts state that as she had learnt her roles in French, she was unable to sing there as the director had insisted on performances in Swedish. Instead, she returned to France in 1877 where she spent the winter season with the Royal Opera of Versailles. The following year she moved to Italy where she sang in various cities for the next three years, particularly in Naples and Milan. Her most successful roles were Margaretha in Gounod's Faust, Maddalena in Verdi's Rigoletto, and in Filippo Marchetti's Ruy Blas. She also appeared as Fides in Meyerbeer's Profeten and Amneris in Verdi's Aida.

In August 1880, she married the Swedish major Rolf Oscar Alexander Schenström, after which she became a music teacher mainly in Sweden and Norway but also in London.

Wilhelmine Holmboe-Schenström died in Oslo on 18 November 1938.
