= 1938 in Nordic music =

The following is a list of notable events and compositions of the year 1938 in Nordic music.

== Events ==
- 18 January – Finnish singer Jukka Ahti and his wife are arrested by Soviet authorities.
- unknown dates
  - Edgar Hayes and his jazz orchestra tour Sweden.
  - Swedish trumpeter Thore Ehrling forms his own band.

== New works ==
- Jacob Gade – Københavnerliv
- Uuno Klami – Symphony No. 1
- Ingemar Liljefors – Five studies for piano

== Popular music ==
- Jules Sylvain & Karl Gerhard – "Jag är ett bedårande barn av min tid"

== Births ==
- 13 January – Paavo Heininen, Finnish pianist and composer (died 2022)
- 23 March – Berit Kullander, Norwegian singer, dancer and actress
- 23 April – Roland Cedermark, Swedish accordionist (died 2020)
- 9 June – Eje Thelin, Swedish jazz trombonist (died 1990)
- 17 June – Grethe Ingmann, Danish singer (died 1990)
- 16 July – Þorkell Sigurbjörnsson, Icelandic pianist, conductor and composer (died 2013)
- 18 July – Povl Dissing, Danish singer, multi-instrumentalist and composer (died 2022)
- 24 August – Rami Sarmasto, Finnish musician and actor (died 1965)
- 21 September – Atli Heimir Sveinsson, Icelandic composer (died 2019)

== Deaths ==
- 26 February – Jukka Ahti, Finnish-born singer, songwriter and actor (born 1897; executed)
- 30 April – Gunnar Olavsson Helland, Hardanger fiddle maker (born 1852)
- 14 June – Thekla Hofer, Swedish operatic soprano (born 1852)
- 2 August – Bjarni Thorsteinsson, Icelandic priest, organist and collector of folk songs (born 1861)
- 18 September – Ole Hjellemo, Norwegian musician and composer (born 1873)
- 4 December – Borghild Holmsen, Norwegian pianist, composer and music critic (born 1865)

== See also ==
- 1938 in Denmark
- 1938 in Iceland
- 1938 in Norwegian music
- 1938 in Sweden
