= Swedish Rhapsody (numbers station) =

Polish numbers station, 1950s to 2007

- Poland
- Broadcast area: Poland
- Frequencies: Several shortwave frequencies between 5.733 and 11.525 MHz

Programming
- Languages: German, English
- Format: Numbers station

Ownership
- Owner: Służba Bezpieczeństwa; Urząd Ochrony Państwa; Agencja Wywiadu

History
- First air date: 1950s or 1960s
- Last air date: 9 April 1998

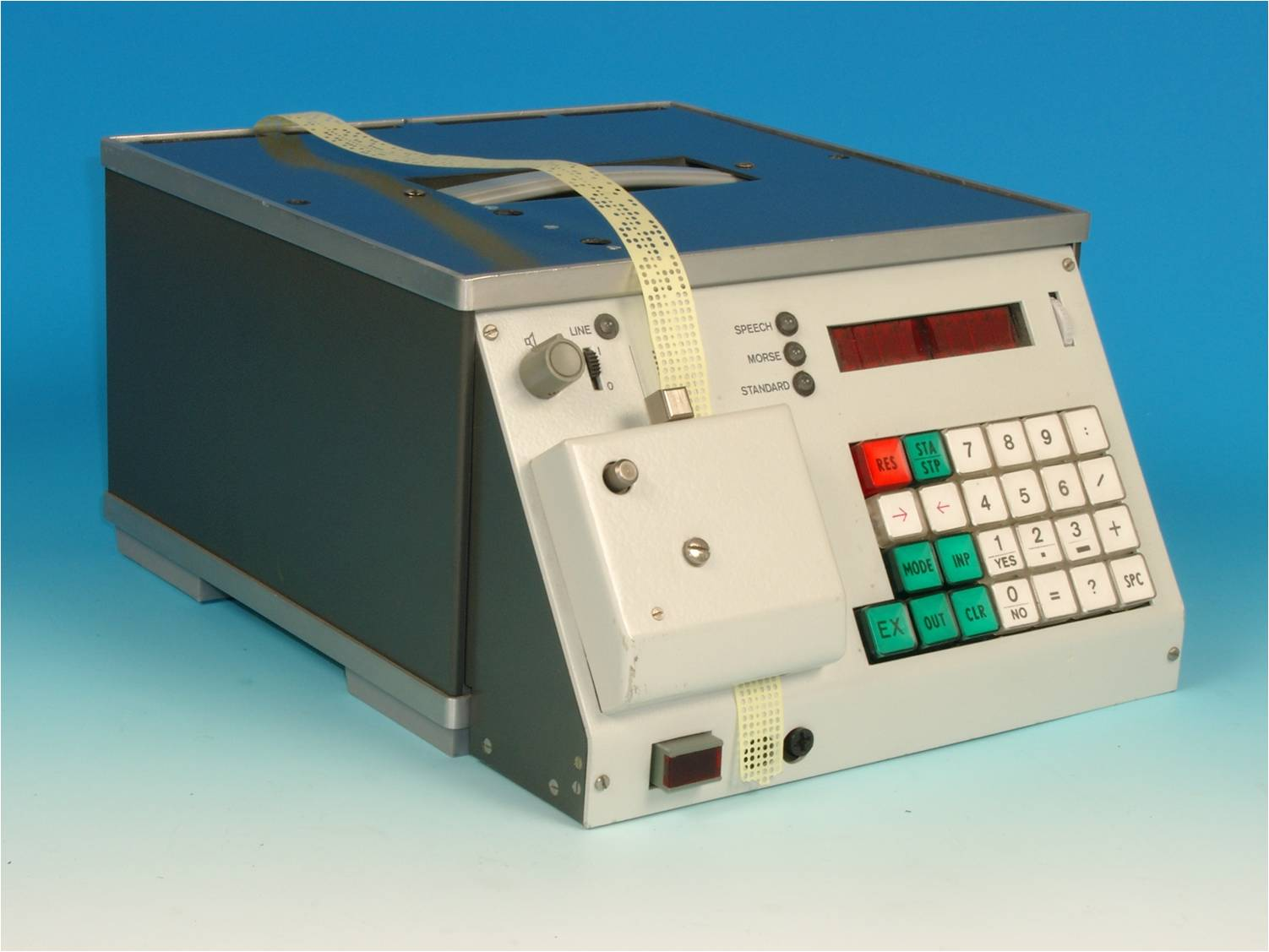
The Sprach-Morse Generator, the machine mistaken for a young girl speaking in German

Swedish Rhapsody (also known as G02) was a Polish numbers station, operated by the Ministry of Public Security (later Office of State Protection and Foreign Intelligence Agency) that used AM broadcasting and operated between the late 1950s and 1998. It was used to send coded messages to intelligence agents in the Western Bloc. It is notable for its use of what was once believed to be the voice of a young girl speaking in German, only revealed to be that of a special machine used by the East German State Security Service known as the "Sprach-Morse-Generator".

== Etymology and format ==
The numbers station got its nickname after listeners believed that the "Swedish Rhapsody No. 1" by Hugo Alfvén was being used as the interval signal. Documents subsequently released from Polish intelligence revealed that the signal was produced by a music box manufactured by Reuge (pitched to sound like an ice cream truck) playing the song. However, the last owners of the station, Foreign Intelligence Agency, claimed that the melody was Emilie Reisdorff's "Luxembourg Polka". It was well known by listeners to follow a rigid schedule, with interruptions and mistakes on the part of the operators being rare.

== History ==
Although the station was of unknown origin during the Cold War, declassified documents released by the Polish Government in 2014 revealed that the station was indeed operated by the government of the Polish People's Republic, and its secret police force, the Ministry of Public Security (Służba Bezpieczeństwa). The Stasi "Sprach-Morse Generator" which provided the automated voice was of East German origin, and known to be used in similar coded broadcasts sent by the Main Directorate for Reconnaissance. Although the East German broadcasts are similar, the voice used for the Swedish Rhapsody was created by tweaking the audio on the Sprach machine, which confused listeners into thinking that the voice was that of a young girl. The documents further reveal that the station was broadcasting from at least the 1970s and transmitted on numerous shortwave frequencies, which were often changed depending on the time of the year. The messages were sent as numbers in groups of five, spoken in German, which were preceded by the voice shouting "Achtung!" (German for "attention!"). The messages were to be decrypted using a one-time pad.

After the fall of communism in Poland and the dissolution of the Soviet Union in 1991, the original station ceased operations. However, between 1998 and 2007, the station could still be heard broadcasting; this time, the English language was used, likely for NATO agents in Eastern Europe.

== References in media ==
- British band Stereolab used "Swedish Rhapsody" throughout the song "Pause", from their 1993 album Transient Random-Noise Bursts with Announcements.
- "Swedish Rhapsody" was used in the 2020 role-playing video game Omori, in the music track "Numbers".
- American rock group Puscifer sampled "Swedish Rhapsody" in the song "Theorem" from their 2020 album Existential Reckoning.
- "Swedish Rhapsody" was used in the horror video game Sad Satan.
- "Even the Waves" on ChromaKey's Debut album Dead Air for Radios samples "Swedish Rhapsody" at the beginning and end of the track
- ”Swedish Rhapsody” was used in the indie survival horror game Signalis repeatedly during sequences throughout the game.
