= 1979 in Nordic music =

The following is a list of notable events and releases that happened in Nordic music in 1979.

== Events ==
- 31 March – At the 24th Eurovision Song Contest, Denmark is the best-performing Scandinavian country, finishing 6th. Norway finishes 11th, Finland 14th and Sweden 17th.
- 13 September – ABBA begin their third concert tour, mainly visiting North America, Europe and Asia during 1979–1980, supporting the group's sixth studio album, Voulez-Vous (1979), and later their compilations Greatest Hits Vol. 2 (1980).

== Classical works ==
- Ulf Grahn – String quartet no 2
- Vagn Holmboe
  - Violin Concerto No. 2
  - Notater for 3 trombones (alto, tenor, baritone) and tuba
  - Konstateringer for choir
  - Guitar Sonata No. 1
  - Guitar Sonata No. 2
  - Accordion Sonata No. 1
  - Bogtrykkemaskinen for violin and piano
- Allan Pettersson – Viola Concerto
- Einojuhani Rautavaara – Magnificat
- Aulis Sallinen – Symphony No. 4

== Hit singles ==
- ABBA – "Gimme! Gimme! Gimme! (A Man After Midnight)" (#1 Belgium, Finland, Denmark, IRE)
- Frederik (singer) – "Tsingis Khan" (#14 Finland)
- Ted Gärdestad – "Satellit" (#10 Sweden)
- Katri Helena – "Katson sineen taivaan" (#3 Finland)
- Jan Malmsjö – "Halleluja" (#7 Sweden)
- Anita Skorgan – "Oliver" (#6 Norway)
- Vikingarna – "Djingis Khan" (#1 Sweden)

== Hit albums ==
- ABBA – Voulez-Vous (#1 Finland, Netherlands, Germany, Japan, Norway, Sweden, UK)
- Kim Larsen – 231045-0637 (#2 Sweden, #7 Norway)
- Jahn Teigen – En dags pause (#1 Norway)

== Film music ==
- Spede Pasanen – Koeputkiaikuinen ja Simon enkelit
- Janne Schaffer – Repmånad

== Births ==
- 26 February – Daníel Bjarnason, Icelandic composer
- 8 April – Alexi Laiho, rock musician (died 2020

== Deaths ==
- 7 March – Klaus Egge, Norwegian composer and music critic (born 1906)
- 3 April – Ernst Glaser, Norwegian violinist, conductor and music teacher (born 1904)
- 12 July – Kalervo Tuukkanen, Finnish composer (born 1909)
- 24 October – Trygve Lindeman, Norwegian cellist and head of the Oslo Conservatory of Music (born 1896)

== See also ==
- 1979 in Denmark
- 1979 in Finland
- 1979 in Iceland
- 1979 in Norwegian music
- 1979 in Sweden
