= Sad Satan =

2015 horror video game

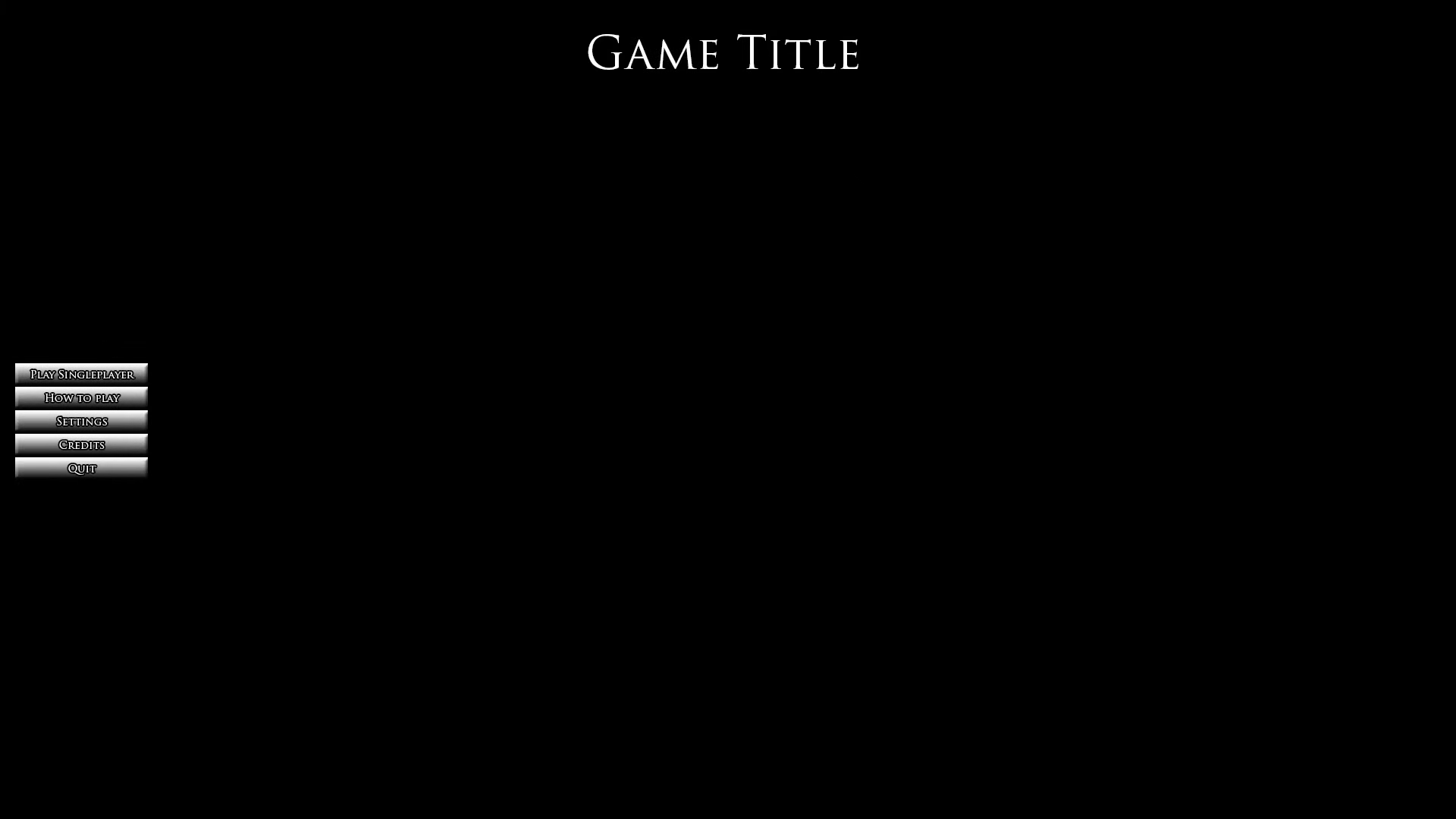
- Title screen
- Developer: ZK
- Engine: Terror
- Platform: Microsoft Windows
- Release: 2015
- Genres: Horror, psychological horror, surrealism, postmodernism
- Modes: Single-player, first-person

Sad Satan is a horror game released for Microsoft Windows in 2015. The game was allegedly created by a dark web user operating under the pseudonym "ZK". In the game, the player walks down dimly, monochrome lit corridors in a first-person view while being periodically interrupted by flashes of full-screen images. There are no goals or win conditions.

There are two prominent versions of Sad Satan; footage of the earliest version was uploaded to the YouTube channel Obscure Horror Corner on June 25, 2015. The channel's videos of the game were picked up by a number of English-language publications and later internationally.

== Gameplay ==
A scene from Sad Satan where a ghostly child stands before the player

Footage uploaded by Obscure Horror Corner shows Sad Satan from a first-person perspective, with the player walking through dark, largely monochromatic corridors amid blurred or shifting visuals and repetitive, heavily distorted audio. Listeners have identified some samples as altered recordings involving Charles Manson, "I Love Beijing Tiananmen", the interval signal of the Swedish Rhapsody numbers station, and The Doors’ rendition of "Alabama Song", although reliable independent sourcing for these exact identifications is limited. Images involving children, Jimmy Savile and the NSPCC led contemporary observers to interpret child abuse as one of the game’s themes. A slowed sample attributed to “Alabama Song” reportedly includes the line “show me the way to the next little girl.”

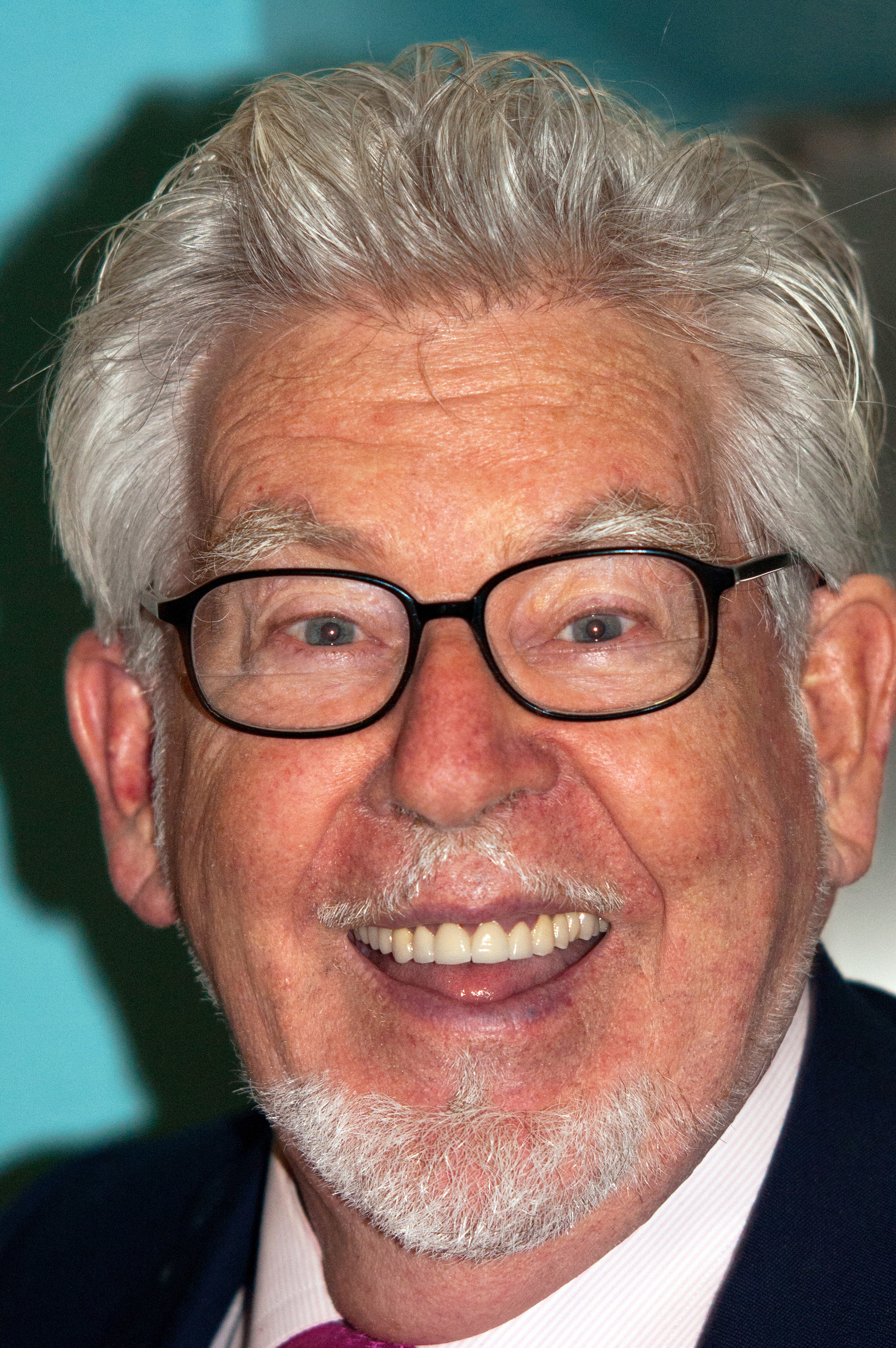
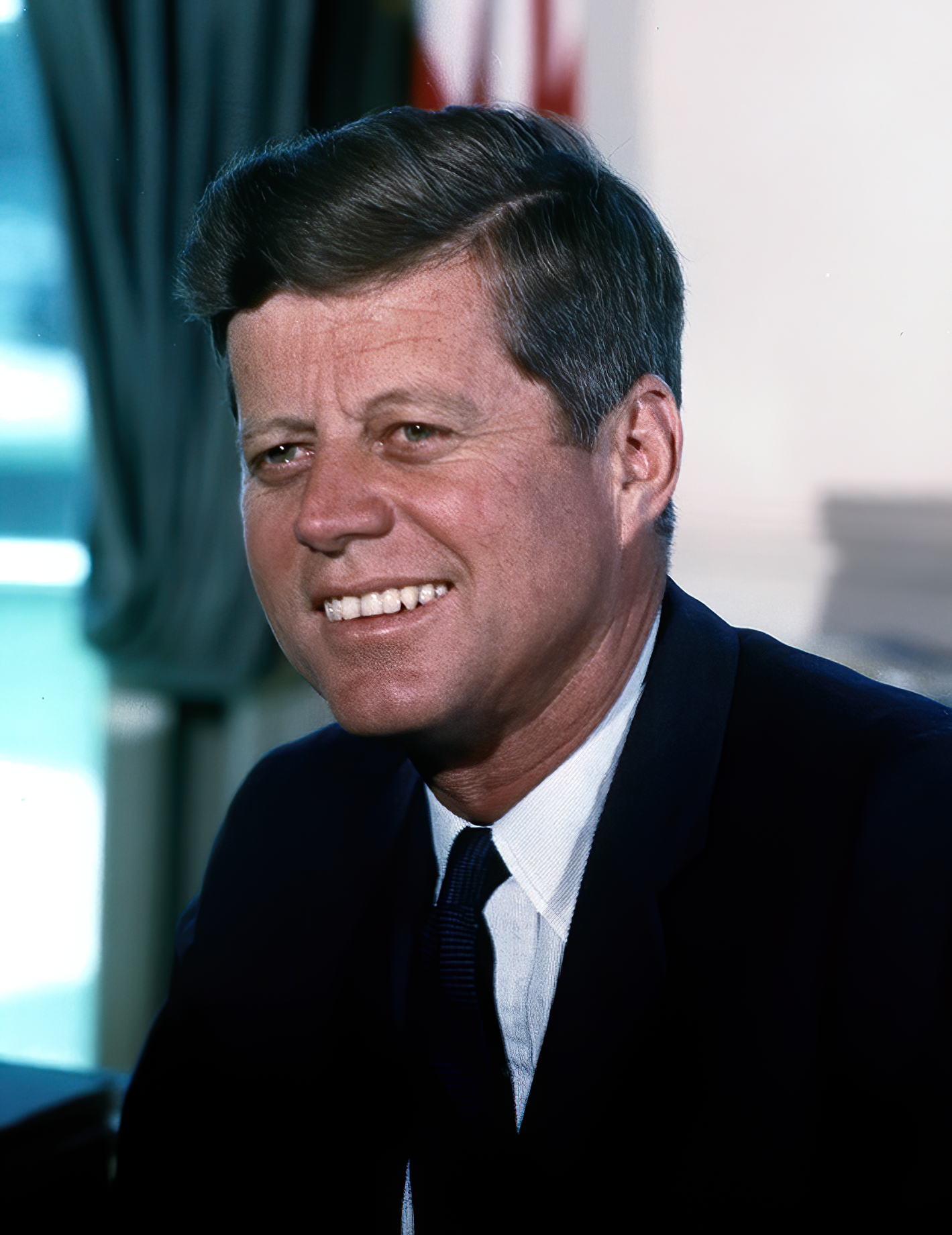
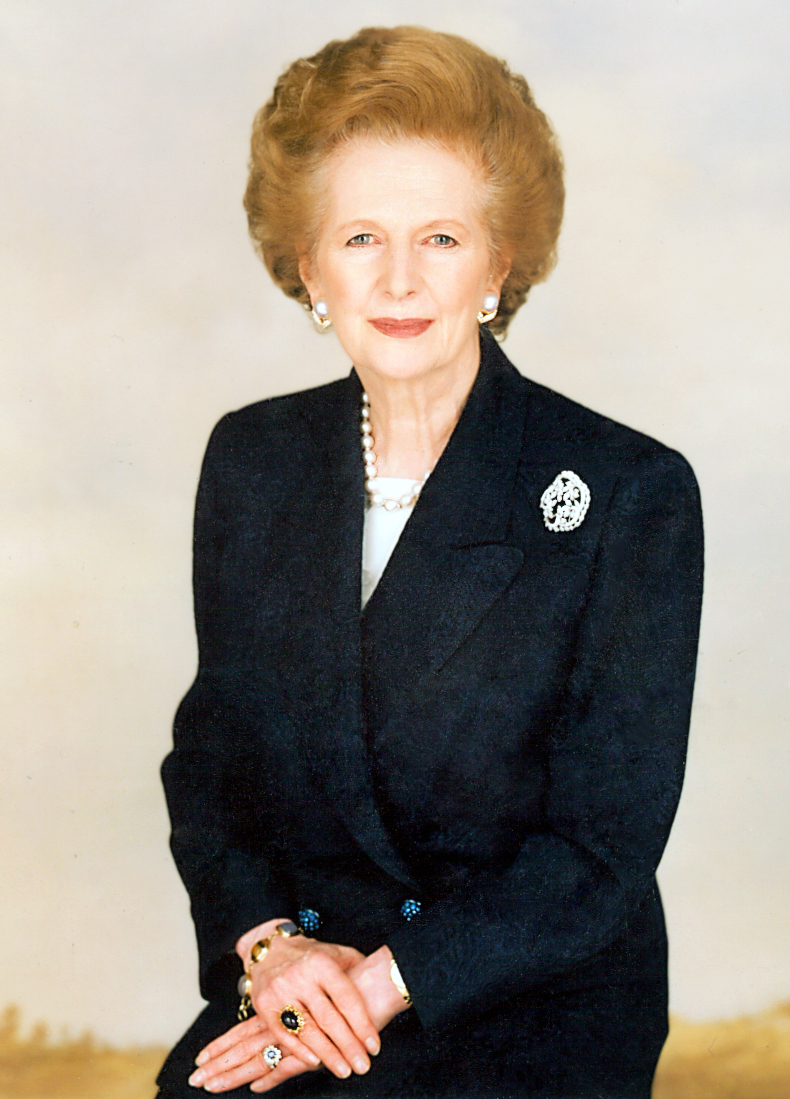
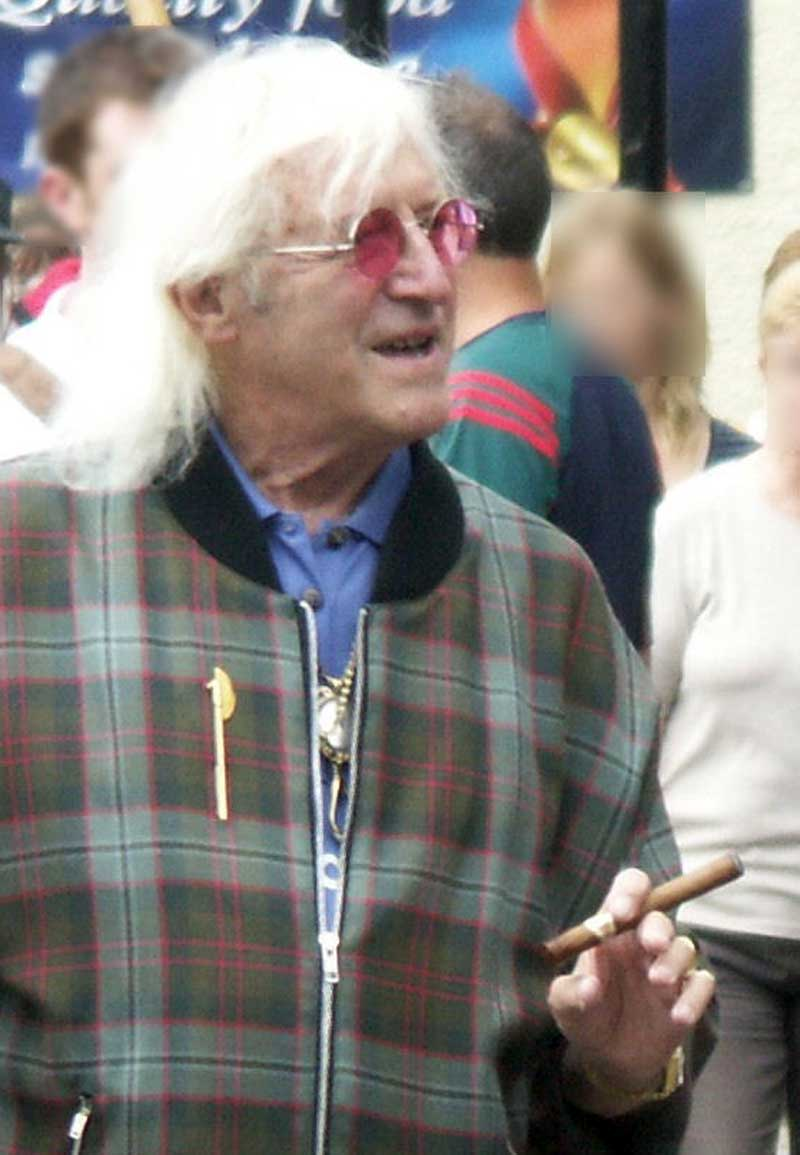
Whilst navigating the hallways, images intermittently fill the screen. Contemporary coverage identified photographs of Jimmy Savile with Margaret Thatcher, Rolf Harris, and John F. Kennedy.

While the player moves through the corridors, photographs and other images periodically obscure the screen before disappearing after a few seconds. Contemporary reports identified images of Savile with Margaret Thatcher, Rolf Harris, Japanese serial killer Tsutomu Miyazaki, John F. Kennedy, and a photograph by Roger Ballen. Several publications interpreted the recurring images of children and convicted or alleged child abusers as references to child abuse.

The only other "characters" in the game are children who bear a resemblance to each other and simply stand in one place and do not move or interact with the player at all. In the final video posted by Obscure Horror Corner, one of these children eventually follows the player, causing damage on contact when it touches the player. Since the player has no means of self-defense or any ability to heal damage, the player will inevitably die at this point in the game.

The later "clone" of Sad Satan and its subsequent offshoots closely follow the gameplay template of the original, but display different, often far more graphic, sets of images. These images include photographs of mutilated corpses and—in the case of the earliest build—an image of child pornography.

== History ==
=== Original game ===
Obscure Horror Corner’s Gameplay
- Sad Satan - Deep Web Horror Game - Part 1
- Sad Satan - Deep Web Horror Game - Part 2
- Sad Satan - Deep Web Horror Game - Part 3
- Sad Satan - Deep Web Horror Game - Part 4
- Sad Stan -Deep Web Horror Game - Part 5

There are two prominent versions of Sad Satan; footage of the earliest version was uploaded to the YouTube channel Obscure Horror Corner on June 25, 2015. In an interview with Kotaku, the proprietor of the YouTube channel Obscure Horror Corner, identified as “Jamie”, claimed that an anonymous subscriber had sent him a link to Sad Satan, which Jamie said he downloaded from an onion site. The subscriber separately told Kotaku that the link had appeared on a dark-web forum in a post signed “ZK”. Kotaku was unable to verify this account and later expressed increased skepticism about the game's alleged dark-web origin. The channel's videos of the game were picked up by a number of English-language publications and later internationally.

=== Clone releases ===
On July 7, Kotaku updated its report after Jamie acknowledged that he had provided an incorrect onion address. He claimed that he had withheld the purported real link because it contained "gore pictures" and child pornography alongside the game. Jamie did not provide the link to Kotaku, which stated that this made his account less credible.

A purported downloadable version was subsequently posted to 4chan by a user calling themself "ZK". Vice reported that users examining its files discovered photographs of mutilated corpses and child pornography, while other users who executed it reported computer issues symptomatic of malware. TecMundo described the version as a "clone", reporting that it contained malicious files and differed from the version shown by Obscure Horror Corner. Although rumours attributed the clone to OHC, Welt reported that its creator and motive remained unknown. On July 9, a member of the r/sadsatan (subreddit) community uploaded a sanitized version of the clone, which Vice described as free of viruses and illegal images. Welt similarly reported that Reddit users produced a malware-free copy stripped of illegal content.

== Legacy ==
Some Reddit users speculated that OHC had created Sad Satan as a publicity stunt, although Jamie denied creating either the original game or the clone. In January 2016, Jamie told Vice that activity on the channel had ceased amid harassment, while leaving open the possibility of uploading additional videos. The sanitized version brought the game further attention and was played by PewDiePie in August 2015.
