= Swedish Rhapsody No. 1 =

Classical composition by Hugo Alfvén

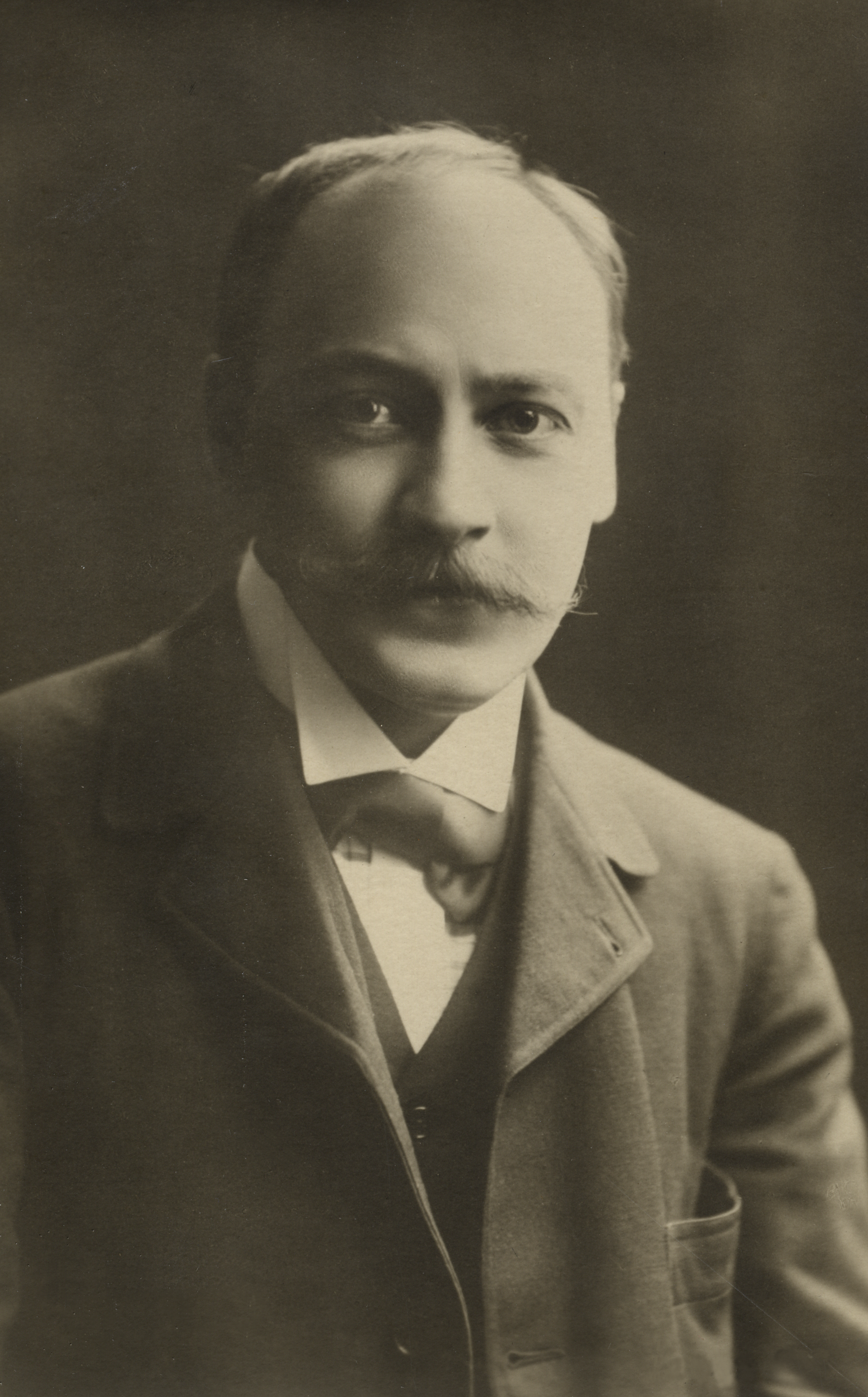
Hugo Alfvén, c. 1906

Swedish Rhapsody No. 1 (Swedish: Svensk rapsodi) is the subtitle of Midsommarvaka (Swedish for 'Midsummer Vigil'), a symphonic rhapsody by the Swedish composer Hugo Alfvén (1872–1960). Although it is only the first of three similarly named works, it is often simply called "the Swedish Rhapsody".

The Rhapsody was written in 1903. It is the best-known piece by Alfvén, and also one of the best-known pieces of music in Sweden. The score, published around 1906, describes it as:

[A] fantasy on popular Swedish folk melodies depicting the moods evoked by an old-time Swedish Midsummer wake; the dancing and games around the May-pole through the magic night of Midsummer Eve. [One theme] is the composer's own invention, while other themes are borrowed from the folk-music of Sweden and elaborated by the composer.

It is scored for an orchestra consisting of three flutes (third doubling on piccolo), three oboes (third doubling on cor anglais), two clarinets in A (second doubling on E♭ clarinet), bass clarinet in A, three bassoons, four horns in F, two trumpets in D, three trombones (two tenor, one bass), one tuba, timpani, cymbals, triangle, crotales, two harps, and strings.

The Rhapsody was adapted as a ballet, La Nuit de St Jean, choreographed by Jean Börlin. It was first performed by Ballets Suedois in Paris in October 1920.

== In popular culture ==
The main theme of "Swedish Rhapsody No. 1" has been used several times in pop culture:

- It is played repeatedly in the 1952 short film The Stranger Left No Card.
- The 1953 recording of the piece by Percy Faith and his orchestra was a US Top 30 hit. The same year, light orchestral British cover versions by Mantovani and Ray Martin made the UK Singles Chart, peaking at no. 2 and no. 4 respectively.
- It was arranged and recorded as a fingerstyle guitar solo in 1957 by American guitarist Chet Atkins, and became one of his best-known recordings.
- It is played for a few seconds by Deep Purple's guitarist Ritchie Blackmore during the version of "Lazy" on the group's live album Made in Japan.
- The numbers station 'Swedish Rhapsody' got its nickname after listeners believed this piece of music was being used as the interval signal. Documents subsequently released from Polish intelligence revealed that the signal was produced by a music box (pitched to sound like an ice cream truck) playing the song. Agencja Wywiadu (the owners of the station) claimed that the melody was Emile Reisdorff's "Luxembourg Polka".
- The opening theme is quoted in the verse of "Mah Nà Mah Nà", written by Piero Umiliani for the film Sweden: Heaven and Hell, and later popularized by The Muppets.
- The Rhapsody was used by the external service of Radio Sweden as a signature tune for international shortwave broadcasts in the 1960s and 1970s. A recording from 1977 can be heard on intervalsignals.net.
