= Carin Malmlöf-Forssling =

Carin Malmlöf-Forssling (6 March 1916 – 11 September 2005) was a Swedish organist, choir director and composer. She was born in Gävle, Sweden, and completed her early studies in organ and directing in Uppsala in 1937. She continued her studies in composition with Melcher Melchers from 1941 to 1943 at the Royal Academy of Music in Stockholm. She graduated with a teaching degree in 1942, and then continued her studies in piano and composition with Nadia Boulanger in Paris. Malmlöf-Forssling completed her education in 1957, and afterward worked as a music teacher and composer.

== Works ==
Selected works include:

- Revival, 1976
- Flowings, 1986
- Ceremonial Prelude for organ, 1937
- Sonata Svickel for solo flute, 1964
- Orizzonte for solo horn, 1981
- Revival for strings, 1976
- Litania for soprano

Her works have been recorded and issued on media, including:

- Bluebell of Sweden, 1985
