= MC Einar =

Danish rap group

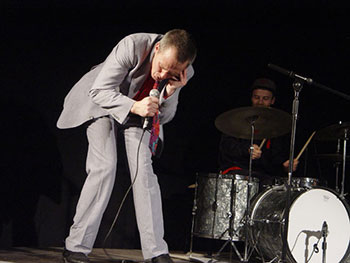
Mc-einar

MC Einar was a Danish pioneer rap music group from 1987 to 1990, who was first to release a Danish language rap album with their 1987 album Den Nye Stil. They described the Copenhagen youth culture as drug addicts, and attained mainstraim popularity with several hits, including Jul, Det' Cool and Arh, Dér!. Also notable was the equilibristic rhymes and language, setting the Danish rap style somewhat apart with a more laid-back style than the then-dominating hard American style. The group was founded 1987 by DJs Nikolaj Peyk and Jan Kabré, rapper Einar Enemark as MC Einar, and human beatbox Jesper Wildmand.

Based in Sorgenfri near Copenhagen, Peyk and Kabré had been in the Danish hip hop environment since its birth in the early 1980s. They made several failed attempts at performing Danish language rap starting in 1986, but would not succeed until the inclusion of Enemark in 1987. Enemark was not previously into hip hop, and part of his success was that he did not try to emulate the style of English-language rappers, but had his own unique Danish style instead. The group then signed a record-deal under the name MC Einar, again moving against the general rap scene as the Danish name "Einar" is a name typically found in elderly generations rather than the young target audience. After internal problems, the band disbanded in 1990.

== Discography ==
- 1988: Den Nye Stil
- 1988: Jul Det' Cool EP
- 1989: Ahr Dér!
- 1994: Og Såd'n Noget
