= Erkki Aaltonen =

Finnish composer

Erkki Aaltonen

Erkki Aaltonen (17 August 1910 – 8 March 1990) was a Finnish composer.

== Biography ==
Born in Hämeenlinna (Tavastehus), Finland, he was a student of the violin at the Helsinki Conservatory and of composition in privacy with Väinö Raitio and Selim Palmgren. He directed the Kemi Music Institute from 1966 to 1973. His musical selections were often of a topical nature.

== Selected works ==
- Symphonies

No. 1 (1947)
No. 2 (1949) Hiroshima
No. 3 (1952) Popular
No. 4 (1959)
No. 5 (1964) Hämeenlinna rhapsody

- Piano Concerto 1948
- Piano Concerto 1954
- Folk music for orchestra 1953–1960
- Ballet suites from Lapponia 1956, 1959
- Violin Concerto (1966)
- Piano Sonata (1932, revised 1972)
- Oboe Sonata (1945)
- Preludi ja allegro (Prelude and Allegro) for viola and piano (1983)
- five string quartets
- piano pieces
- songs
