= Aino (Melartin) =

Aino is an opera by Erkki Melartin, composed in 1912 to a libretto by Jalmari Finne. The opera is based on the Kalevala, more specifically on the character of Aino. Its music shows the influence of Richard Wagner.

== Synopsis ==
Väinö, a godly figure and the son of Luonnotar, wants to taste the pleasures of mortals. He does so with Aino who personifies nature. Väinö meets Aino and they agree to marry. Aino's brother Jouko opposes the match and challenges Väinö to a singing match which he loses. The second act traces the preparations for the wedding and the ceremony itself. Väinö fashions a kantele, a musical instrument, from a birch tree. Aino disappears and in the final ecstatic monologue dives into the sea against the aural tapestry of a chorus of water nymphs.

== Recording ==
Aino (1907–09) – Opera in Two Acts (prelude, 14 scenes, interlude and epilogue) Ritva-Liisa Korhonen (sop) – Aino Sauli Tiilikainen (bar) – Vaino Lilli Paaskivi (mz) – Taina, Aino's mother Pia Freund (sop) – Ainikki, Aino's sister Aki Alamikkotervo (ten) – Jouko, Aino's brother Dominante Choir Seppo Murto, Lahti SO Ulf Söderblom Rec. public concerts, March 2000, Sibelius Hall, Lahti BIS-CD-1193/1194 [105.01]
