= Jukka Ahti =

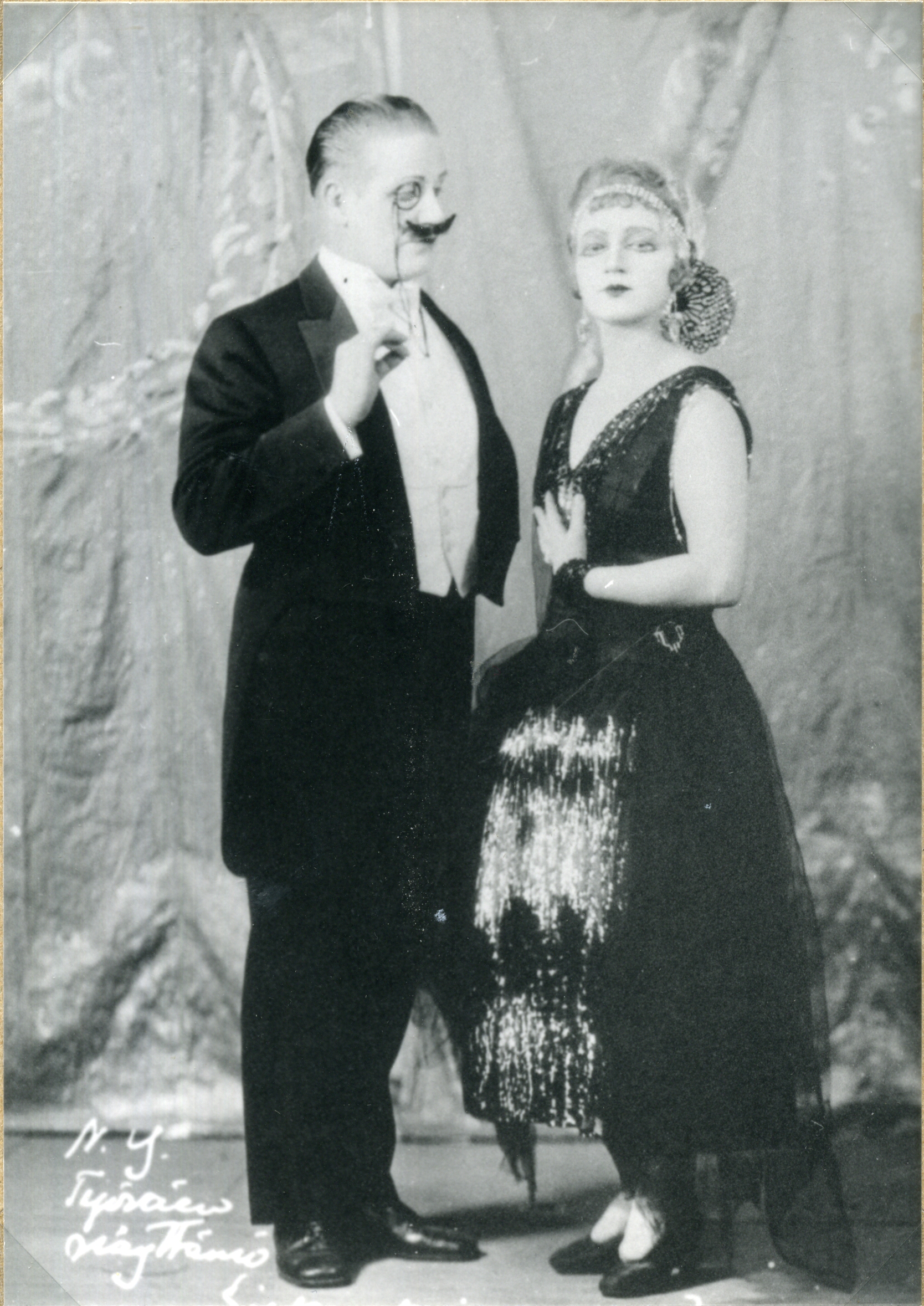
- Jukka Ahti and Katri Lammi performing Die Zirkusprinzessin in New York, late 1920s

Background information
- Born: Jukka Hietanen; April 26, 1897; Kotka, Grand Duchy of Finland, Russian Empire
- Died: February 26, 1938 (aged 40) Petrozavodsk, Russian SFSR, Soviet Union
- Genres: Schlager music
- Occupations: Singer, songwriter
- Instrument: Vocals
- Years active: 1920s and 1930s
- Label: Victor Talking Machine Company

Jukka Ahti, originally Hietanen (April 26, 1897 – February 26, 1938), was a Finnish American singer, songwriter and actor.

Ahti was born in Kotka and moved to the US as a young man. He started to perform at the workers' scenes in New York City, where he married the Finnish American actor and singer Katri Lammi. Between 1929 and 1931, Ahti made 30 recordings for Victor Talking Machine Company. Most of the recordings were made with the Italian born conductor Alfredo Cibelli and his orchestra.

Ahti's career ended because of the Great Depression in the beginning of the 1930s. He and his wife moved to Petrozavodsk in Soviet Karelia. They continued performing at the Finnish theatre and for the local radio station. When Stalin's terror reached Karelia in 1937, Ahti and his wife were arrested. Ahti was arrested on January 18, 1938, and was shot near Petrozavodsk on February 26.
