= Valdemar Söderholm =

Swedish composer and musicologist (1909–1980)

Valdemar Söderholm (1909–1980) was a Swedish composer, organist, and music teacher.

Söderholm studied at the conservatory of the Royal Swedish Academy of Music. He later taught at the Royal College of Music and was held in high esteem as a Palestrina and Bach specialist. In particular, Anders Eliasson and Magnus Andersson were his students.
