= Krummi krunkar úti =

Icelandic folk song

- Krummavísa
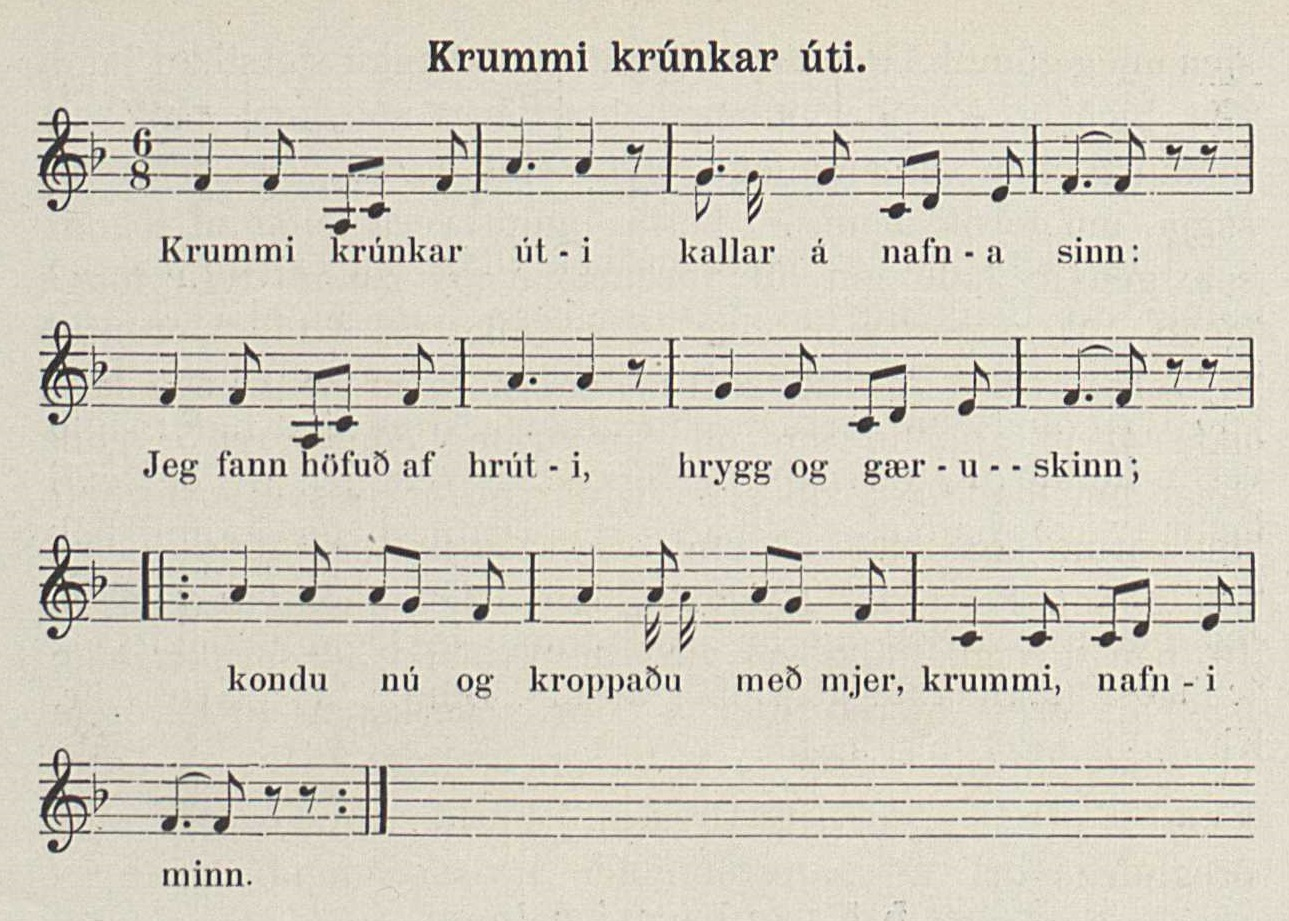
- 1906 printing
- Language: Icelandic
- Publication date: 1898
- Lines: 8
- Krummavísa at Icelandic Wikisource

Krummi krunkar úti (A Raven Croaks Outside) or Krummavísa (Raven Verse) is a traditional Icelandic folk song or nursery rhyme. It is based on the centuries-old Icelandic folk belief that the raven summons its kin when it finds food.

The words of the traditional song were first printed in 1898 in the scholarly book Þulur og skemtanir (Rhymes and Amusements) by Ólafur Davíðsson, and were put to music in 1906 in Íslenzk þjóðlög (Icelandic Folk Songs) by Bjarni Þorsteinsson. Bjarni learned the song from Ólafur, who in turn learned it as a child in Sléttuhlíð. The lyrics have since been regularly published in newspapers and books, including the classic children's anthology Vísnabókin.

Krummavísa is a húsgangur (literally "house-goer"), a widely circulated traditional verse passed informally from household to household. The song has been described as being known by all Icelandic children, and as a familiar cultural reference, it has appeared in literary satire and book reviews.

As with all traditional Icelandic poetry, Krummavísa is alliterative: a line of verse must have two stressed words beginning with the same sound, and the first word of the next line must also begin with the same sound. Here, for example, the first line has two words beginning with a K (krummi and krunkar) and the first word of the second line also begins with a K (kallar).

== Lyrics ==
Krummi krunkar úti,
kallar á nafna sinn.
Ég fann höfuð af hrúti,
hrygg og gæruskinn.
Komdu nú og kroppaðu með mér,
krummi nafni minn.
Komdu nú og kroppaðu með mér,
krummi nafni minn.

Translation:

A raven croaks outside,
calling out for his name-sake.
I found a head of a ram,
his spine and skin.
Come now and pick at it with me,
Krummi my name-sake.
Come now and pick at it with me,
Krummi my name-sake.
