= Cecilia Damström =

Finnish composer

Cecilia Damström (born 28 July 1988) is a Finnish award-winning composer. She is known for expressing strong political opinions through her works for orchestra and choir.

== Career ==
Born in Helsinki, Damström studied composition at Tampere University of Applied Sciences (2008–2014) and at Malmö Academy of Music (2014–2015 and 2017–2018) under the instruction of Hannu Pohjannoro and Luca Francesconi.

Damström's music has been performed by the Finnish National Opera and Ballet, Finnish Radio Symphony Orchestra and the Brodsky Quartet, among others

Damström has won the first prize at the International Vocal Espoo Choral Composition Competition, the International Linköpings Studentsångare Composition Award and the International Josef Dorfman Composition Competition.

== List of works ==
=== Orchestra ===
- Extinctions (2023), sinfoniaorkesterille, 20 min
- Wasteland (2022), symphony orchestra, 20 min
- ICE (2021), symphony orchestra, 10 min
- Fretus (2021), string orchestra, 10 min
- Nixus (2020), symphony orchestra, 10 min
- Lucrum (2018), symphony orchestra, 7 min
- Tundo! (2016/2018), symphony orchestra, 10 min
- Infirmus (2015), string orchestra, 7 min
- Unborn (2012–2014), symphony orchestra, 10 min
- Paradiso (2015), wind orchestra, 4 min

=== Opera ===
- Ovllá (2025), opera in Northern Sámi and Finnish, 135 min
- Vickan & Väinö (2019), fairytale opera, 35 min
- Djurens planet (2018), school opera, 40 min
- Dumma kungen (2016), fairytale opera, 65 min

=== Chamber music ===
- Vibrations (2021), recorder flute, violin and organ, 17 min
- Cura (2020), violin and piano, 7 min
- Helene (2020), piano and wind quartet, 20 min
- Nisus (2019), string trio, 7 min
- Aino (2018), Pierrot ensemble, 23 min
- Letters (2018), string quartet, 15 min
- Minna (2017), piano quintet, 24 min
- Celestial Beings (2018), violin and viola, 13 min
- Groove (2015), flute and accordion, 7 min
- Via Crucis (2012–2014), string quartet, 20 min

=== Solo works ===
- Renewables (2022), accordion, 14 min
- Epitaph (2018), piano, 5 min
- Shapes (2016), accordion, 16 min
- Characters (2015) 11 miniatures for piano, 6 min
- Sydänlaulu (2014), violin, 6 min
- Under Stjärnhimmelen (2014) for piano/organ/guitar, 2:30 min
- Psychedelic (2012), piano, 11 min
- Loco (2010), alto violin, 5min
- Piano Delirium (2009), piano, 3min

=== Vocal music ===
- Framtidens skugga (2019–2020), mezzo soprano and piano, 18 min
- Öar i ett hav som strömmar (2018), soprano and piano, 15 min
- Tidens ordning (2017), bass baritone and piano, 8 min
- Ordet (2015–2016) for female and male voice, cla, 2 vln, vla, vlc, cb, 13 min
- Dagbok (2011) for soprano and orchestra or piano, 10 min
- Landet som icke är (2009), sop, bar, 2 vln, vla, vlc, cb, tr, perc, 7 min

=== Choral music ===
- Hav (2020), male choir, 15 min
- Requiem for our Earth (2019), female choir with electronics and video projection, 30 min
- Angor (2015), mixed choir, 6 min
- At Teasdale’s (2016), male choir, 5 min
- Credo (2012), mixed choir, 7min
- El jardín de las morenas (2014), children choir, 7min
- Han som du älskar finns inte mer (2009), mixed choir, 7min
- Min Gud (2010), mixed choir or female choir, 11 min

== Awards ==
- Teosto Prize, Finland, 2022
- Free State of Bavaria: International Artist-in-Residence-Programme Villa Concordia in Bamberg 2021-2022
- Children opera of the year 2018
- Rosenborg-Gehrmans Award for the young composer of the year 2018
- International Vocal Espoo Choral Composition Competition 2016
- International Linköpings Studentsångare Composition Award 2016
- International Josef Dorfman Composition Competition 2015
