= Anders Eliasson =

Swedish composer (1947–2013)

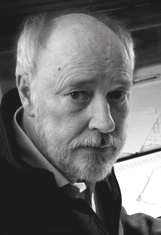
Anders Erik Birger Eliasson

Anders Erik Birger Eliasson (3 April 1947 – 20 May 2013) was a Swedish composer.

== Life ==
Eliasson was born in Borlänge. His "earliest musical experiences originated from within myself: they were my own singing, and familiar tunes I heard on the radio. No classical music." Marching his toy soldiers up and down, he used to imagine sounds, learning only later to describe them as an orchestra. Aged 9, he began the trumpet, started up a small jazz orchestra (two clarinets, trombone, rhythm section, guitar, trumpet), and aged 10 he was writing arrangements. A jazz bass-player, "an unbelievable musician", taught him chords. Aged 14, he went to an organist, Uno Sandén, to learn harmony and counterpoint.

Aged 16 he went for private study in Stockholm to "the wonderful Valdemar Söderholm", who "confronted me once more with real music" – music such as he had first heard aged about 12. "The first real piece of music" which Eliasson heard "on a gramophone record was Haydn’s Symphony No. 104."

Under Söderholm, he studied counterpoint: there followed five years’ intensive work on Palestrina, Orlando di Lasso and above all Johann Sebastian Bach, "the highest form of energy with which it’s possible to come into contact."

From 1966 he was a student under Ingvar Lidholm at the Royal Swedish Academy of Music, and until 1973 a member of the artistic committee of the Electronic Music Foundation, Stockholm. His first major successes were a choral work, Canto del vagabondo (1979), and his First Symphony (1989), for whose "originality, authenticity and musical clarity" Eliasson was awarded the Nordic Council Music Prize.

In 1991 he was composer in residence at the Lapland Festival in Arjeplog and visiting professor at Sibelius Academy Helsinki in the academic year 1993/94. 37 works of Eliasson's were performed at the "1996 International Composer´s Festival Stockholm".

From 2000 Eliasson had performed a monodrama for soprano and 27 instrumentalists (Karolinas sömn / Karolina´s Sleep, premiered in 2012), a great number of chamber music as well as five large-scale concertos: a Concerto for Trombone and Orchestra (written for Christian Lindberg), a Concerto for Alto Saxophone and String Orchestra (for John-Edward Kelly, the dedicatee of Eliasson's 3rd Symphony), a Double Concerto for Violin, Piano and Orchestra (for Roland Pöntinen and Ulf Wallin), a Double Concerto for Violin, Viola and Chamber Orchestra as well as a Concerto for Violin and Orchestra (Solitary Journey, original title in German, Einsame Fahrt).

Together with the composers Kalevi Aho, who was chairman of the jury, and Magnus Lindberg, Eliasson was juror in the 2nd International Uuno Klami Composer Competition 2008/09.

From 2005 until his death, Anders Eliasson was composer-in-residence of the New York-based Arcos Chamber Ensemble. He died in Stockholm, aged 66.

'The International Anders Eliasson Society' was registered on 7 March 2016 in Vienna; its inaugural meeting took place on 11 March 2016 at Stockholm's Konserthuset.

== Aesthetics ==
Eliasson became familiar with classical and modernist aesthetics while still a student. "I was initially happy to be allowed to be a student in the proper way. But when I compared what was then fashionable to the classical period, the latter seemed so much better!" When he was accepted for Ingvar Lidholm's composition class, he was, he says, shocked, because "when I came into contact with luminaries such as Karl [sic!] Karkoschka (actually Erhard Karkoschka) or Roman Haubenstock-Ramati – who were delightful people – I suddenly lost all contact with the music I had inside myself." At that time, Stockholm was "a modernist fortress: dodecaphony, serialism, aleatoric music, musique concrète – there was every technique and trend and fashion. György Ligeti, John Cage and Terry Riley all taught in Stockholm. It was no big deal to master all that – it was only a question of techniques, not of music, nothing about it was authentic. [....] It was a time of unbearable self-denial. Metrical rhythms, melodies, even particular intervals were all taboo in contemporary music. This was a catastrophe for the human voice and the human ear – was then, and still is." Anyone stepping out of line, he said, was immediately banished. He mentioned an example from Sweden, Allan Pettersson.

== Selected works ==
=== Orchestra ===
- 1968: Exposition för kammarorkester (Exposition for Chamber Orchestra)
- 1977: Canti in lontananza för liten orkester (Songs from a Distance for Small Orchestra)
- 1978: Impronta för orkester
- 1978: Turnings för orkester (Turnings for Orchestra)
- 1988: Fantasia per orchestra för orkester

=== Symphonies ===
- 1984: Sinfonia da camera för kammarorkester (Sinfonia di camera for Chamber Orchestra
- 1986: Symfoni nr 1 för orkester (Symphony No. 1 for Orchestra)
- 1987: Symfonie nr 2 (fragment; unpublished)
- 1989: Sinfonia concertante: Symfoni nr 3 för altsaxofon och orkester (Sinfonia concertante: Symphony No. 3 for Alto-Saxophone and Orchestra [2010: version for Soprano Saxophone and Orchestra])
- 2005: Symphony No. 4 for Orchestra
- 2013: Symphony No. 5 (commissioned by Helsinki Philharmonic in 2016; to be premièred 29 May 2013; the composer talked about it, but never started work on it.)

=== Concerti ===
- 1982: Concerto per fagotto ed archi för fagott och stråkorkester (Concerto for Bassoon and Strings)
- 1992: Klarinettkonsert – Sette passaggi för klarinett och orkester (Clarinet Concerto – Seven Paths for Clarinet and Orchestra)
- 1992: Concerto per violino ed orchestra d´archi för violin och stråkorkester (Concerto for Violin and Strings)
- 1992: Farfalle e ferro: Concerto per corno ed archi för horn och stråkorkester (Butterflies and Iron: Concerto for Horn and Strings)
- 1996: Konsert för basklarinett och orkester (Concerto for Bass Clarinet and Orchestra)
- 2000: Concerto per trombone för trombon och orkester (Concerto for Trombone and Orchestra)
- 2002: Konsert för altsaxofon och stråkorkester (Concerto for Alto Saxophone and Strings [2009: version for Soprano Saxophone and Strings])
- 2005 Concerto per violino, piano ed orchestra: dubbelkonsert för violin, piano och orkester (Concerto for Violin, Piano and Orchestra: Double concerto for Violin, Piano and Orchestra)
- 2009: Concerto per violino, viola ed orchestra da camera: dubbelkonsert för violin, viola och kammarorkester (Concerto for Violin, Viola and Orchestra: Double Concerto for Violin, Viola and Chamber Orchestra [2 Horns, 2 Oboes und Strings])
- 2010: Einsame Fahrt / Solitary Journey - Concerto for Violin and Orchestra (original title in German)

=== Choral ===
- 1979: "Canto del Vagabondo in memoriam di Carolus Linnaeus per orchestra, coro femminile e voce bianca" (Canto del vagabondo in memoriam di Carolus Linnaeus for boy soprano, ladies choir and orchestra, in three movements: Conflitto, Mezzogiorno (attacca) Infinito)
- 1998: Dante anarca: oratorium för sopran, alt, tenor, bas, blandad kör och orkester (Dante Anarca: Oratorio for Soprano, Alto, Tenor, Bass, Mixed Choir and Orchestra). Text: Giacomo Oreglia: Dante Anarca e i suoi sei maestri / Dante Anarca and his Six Masters)
- 2007: Quo vadis för tenor, blandad kör och orkester (Quo Vadis for Tenor, Mixed Choir and Orchestra)

=== Works for string orchestra ===
- 1981: Desert point för stråkorkester (Desert point for String Orchestra)
- 1987: Ostacoli för stråkorkester (Ostacoli/Obstacles for String Orchestra)
- 2001: Sinfonia per archi [Sinfonia da camera II] för stråkorkester (Sinfonia per archi for String Orchestra [Chamber Symphony No. II])
- 2003: Ein schneller Blick ... ein kurzes Aufscheinen (A Brief Glance ... a Fleeting Vision) för stråkorkester (for String Orchestra)

=== Selected chamber music ===
- 1970/1992: In medias för soloviolin (In medias for solo violin). Durata: 6
- 1986: Poem (1986/1988) för altsaxofon och piano (Poem for alto saxophone and piano [Version for alto saxophone and piano of Längs radien, 1986]. Durata: 10´
- 1987: Sotto il Segno del Sole för slagverkare, 3 flöjter, 3 oboer, 3 klarinetter, 3 fagotter, 3 horn och kontrabas (Under the Sign of the Sun for percussion, 3 flutes, 3 oboes, 3 clarinets, 3 bassoons, 3 horns and double bass). Durata: 15´
- 1991: Quartetto d'archi för stråkkvartett (Quartetto d'archi for String Quartet). Durata: 20´
- 2003: Pentagramm för oboe, klarinett, fagott, horn och piano (Pentagramm for oboe, clarinet, bassoon, horn and piano). Durata: 16´
- 2010: Fantasia per sei strumenti (Fantasia for Six Instruments: for flute [Piccolo and Alto], clarinet, piano, violin, viola and cello). Durata: 10´
- 2010: Trio för violin, vibrafon och piano (Trio for Violin, Vibraphone and Piano). Durata. 17´
- 2012: Trio d´archi `Ahnungen´(String Trio `Intuitions´; [for violin, viola and violoncello). Durata: 26´

=== Music drama ===
- 2011: Karolinas sömn för sopran och kammarensemble (Karolina´s Sleep for Soprano and Chamber ensemble). Libretto: Bengt Emil Johnson. Durata: 48´; premiered June 4, 2012 at Konsthallen Artipelag, Hålludden, Värmdön. Commissioned by the Royal Swedish Opera, Soloist: Lena Hoel; Kungliga Hovkapellet; Conductor: Daniel Blendulf; production: Christina Ouzounidis.
