= Olena Falkman =

Swedish singer

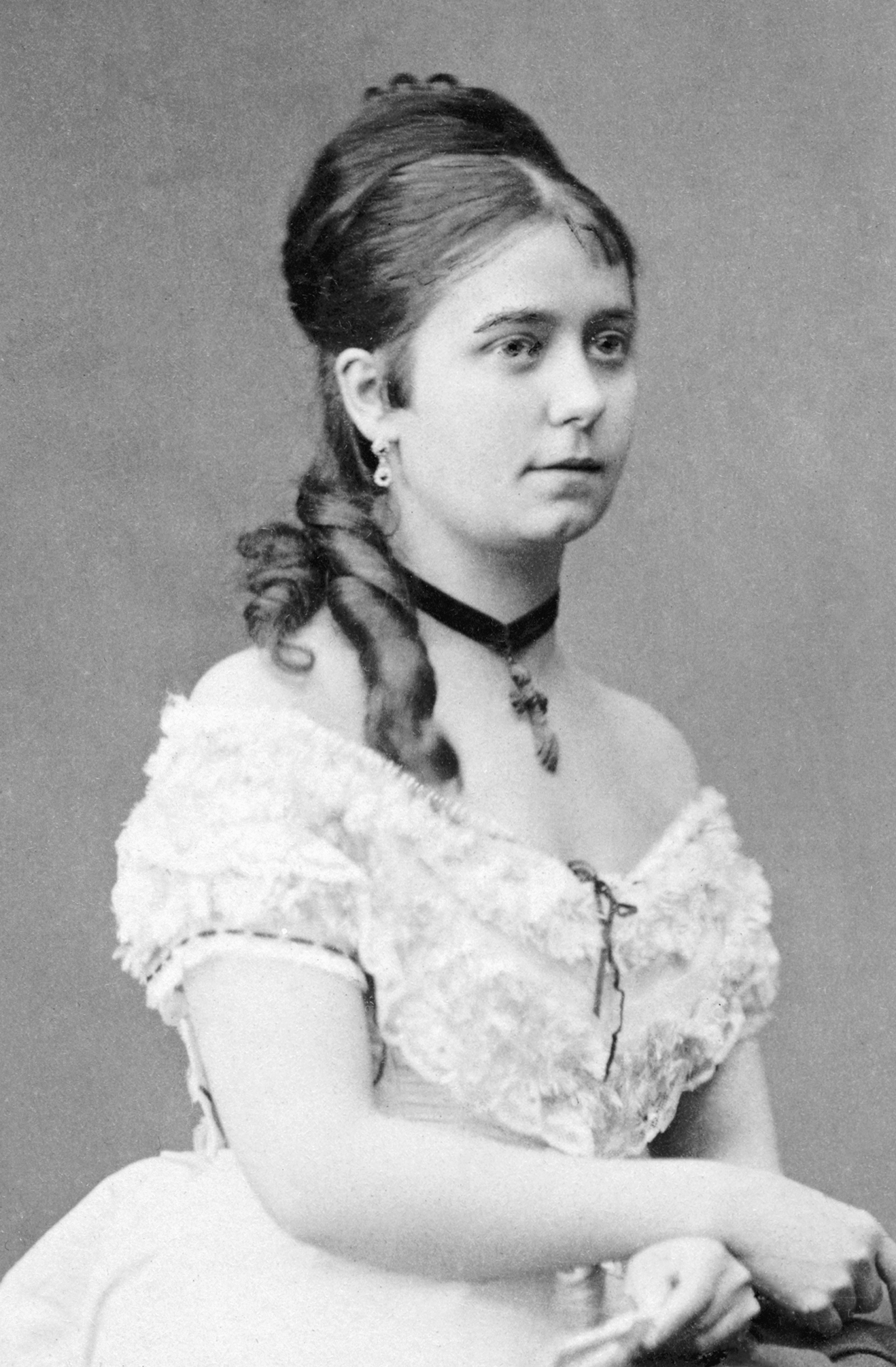
Portrait of Olena Falkman

"Olena" Ida Theresia Falkman (22 September 1849 – 13 September 1928) was a Swedish concert vocalist (alto).

She was born in Stockholm to Carl Johan Falkman, a Swedish official at the Imperial Russian court in Saint Petersburg, and Sofia Albertina Peterson. Her parents were from Sweden, but she was raised in Russia.

Olena Falkman was a student of the Italian vocalist pedagogue, Ronconi. Prior to her marriage, she toured Europe with the concert violinist August Wilhelmj. She was advised to contact Richard Wagner in Bayreuth, but she preferred to perform at concerts rather than to be an opera singer. She also toured Scandinavia with the violinist Joseph Joachim.

In 1876, she married Theodor Rabenius, principal at Uppsala University, and discontinued her career. During her marriage, she did occasionally perform for charity concerts in Uppsala. She died in Stockholm.

Ludvig Norman dedicated the music of the Rosa rorans bonitatem to her.
