= Symphony No. 6 (Sallinen) =

Symphony in four movements by Aulis Sallinen

- From a New Zealand Diary
- by Aulis Sallinen
- Opus: 65
- Composed: 1989–90
- Duration: Approx. 40 minutes
- Movements: 4

Premiere
- Date: 6 September 1990
- Location: Napier, New Zealand
- Conductor: Okko Kamu
- Performers: New Zealand Symphony Orchestra

The Symphony No. 6, From a New Zealand Diary, Op. 65, is an orchestral composition by the Finnish composer Aulis Sallinen, who wrote the piece from 1989–90. The New Zealand Symphony Orchestra, the commissioning institution, premiered the work on 6 September 1990 in Napier, under the baton of Sallinen's longtime advocate, Okko Kamu. Sallinen and his wife had vacationed in New Zealand the year before, providing the composer with inspiration for the symphony, which—though properly symphonic in scope and in structure—has been described as involving "tone painting"; indeed, each of the four movements contains a descriptive title, unusual for a Sallinen symphony.

== Instrumentation ==
According to the publisher, Novello & Co, Symphony No. 6 is scored for the following:

- Woodwind: 3 flutes (2 doubling piccolo), 3 oboes (1 doubling cor anglais), 3 clarinets in B♭ (1 doubling E♭ clarinet, 1 doubling B♭ bass clarinet), 3 bassoons (1 doubling contrabassoon)
- Brass: 4 horns in F, 3 trumpets in B♭, 3 trombones, 1 tuba
- Percussion: timpani, percussionists (individual instruments?)
- Strings: violins, violas, cellos, double basses, harp, celesta

== Structure ==
The symphony is in four movements:

1. The Islands of the Sounds. The Sounds of the Islands (attacca)
2. Air, Rain
3. Kyeburn Diggings (attacca)
4. Finale: "Simply by sailing in a new direction / You could enlarge the world" (Allen Curnow)

== Recordings ==
To date, Symphony No. 6 has received two recordings, the first of which is from 1992 with Okko Kamu conducting the Malmö Symphony Orchestra on the BIS label. Finnish conductor Ari Rasilainen has also recorded the symphony as part of cpo's compendium of Sallinen's orchestral works. The Sixth Symphony joins the Cello Concerto (Op. 44, 1977) on the final volume of the cpo series.

Conductor	Orchestra	Year	Recording venue	Duration	Label (Available on)
Okko Kamu	Malmö Symphony Orchestra	1990	Malmö Concert Hall (Malmö)	42:47	BIS (511)
Ari Rasilainen	Norrköping Symphony Orchestra	2003	De Geerhallen (Norrköping)	39:33	cpo (999971-2)

== Notes, references, and sources ==
=== Sources ===
Books

- Korhonen, Kimmo (2007). Inventing Finnish Music: Contemporary Composers from Medieval to Modern. Finnish Music Information Center (FIMIC). ISBN 978-952-5076-61-5.

Journal articles

- Scott, Phillip (2009). "Classical Recordings—Sallinen". Fanfare. 32 (5): 227–29. (subscription required)
- Weitzman, Ronald (1997). "Sallinen's Seven Symphonies". Tempo. New Series (202). Cambridge University Press: 8–15. (subscription required)
