= Gunnar Berg (composer) =

Danish composer (1909–1989)

Gunnar Berg (11 January 1909 – 25 August 1989) was a Swiss-born Danish composer. A leading exponent of serialism in Denmark, he is considered to have written the first Danish serial piece, his Cosmogonie for two pianos, in 1952.

== Biography ==
=== Early life and education in Switzerland ===
The son of a Swedish mother and a Danish father, Gunnar Berg was born in St. Gallen, Switzerland on January 11, 1909. His father died when he was five years old. He lived in Copenhagen from the years 1921 to 1924 during which time he battled severe illness and spent most of his time in sanatoriums.

Berg began studying the piano at the age of 14. He spent a short time in Paris before settling again in Copenhagen again in 1928. In 1931 he made the decision to devote his life to music and he managed to earn a place studying music at the Salzburg Festival in the summer of 1932. He later returned to that program for further studies in 1935. He studied privately with Knud Jeppesen who aided him in matriculating to the Royal Danish Academy of Music in 1936. There the composition program mirrored Danish tastes for the style of Carl Nielsen for which Berg had no interest. His compositions from the mid to late 1930s displayed his interest in emulating the work Béla Bartók, Igor Stravinsky, and other modernist composers from Central Europe. Unhappy with the school's lack of interest in musical modernism, he completed his first year at the conservatory and then dropped out.

Berg continued to his education privately by studying music theory with Hilding Rosenberg and piano with Herman David Koppel from 1938 to 1943. He pursued further piano instruction with Elisabeth Jürgens from 1944 through 1947. Concerts of his compositions which utilized free atonality were given in Copenhagen in 1945 and 1947, but were reviewed poorly by music critics. He gave a series of piano recitals at refugee camps in Denmark during World War II.

=== Life in Paris ===
In 1948, Berg moved to Paris, where he pursued further studies for a brief period with Arthur Honegger; there he found acceptance in the avant-garde music scene, where he was finally able to find a community which shared musical point of view; a circle which included Honegger, Olivier Messiaen, John Cage, Pierre Boulez and Karlheinz Stockhausen.Serialism began to make its mark already in the newcomer's Pièce for trumpet, violin and piano from 1949, and henceforth Berg uncompromisingly yet in his very own fashion would remain faithful to the complex expressive mode of musical modernism, from now on always composing within the theoretical and aesthetic framework of serialism. In 1950 he attended the first Salzburg Global Seminar (then known as the Salzburg Seminar in American Studies).

In 1952, with the French pianist Béatrice Duffour, he traveled to Darmstadt, where they studied at the Darmstädter Ferienkurse. He was the first Dane to enrol in this program. He married Duffour in the summer of 1952, after the course ended. In 1953 a concert of his music was given in Paris, after which he toured Europe with his wife in concerts of avant-garde music sponsored by France's Ministry for Europe and Foreign Affairs. His Essai accoustique III' (1954) was well received and he was nominated for the Nordic Council Music Prize. He also had success with his ballet Mouture which received multiple stagings in the Netherlands in 1956.

=== Later life in Denmark and Switzerland ===
Berg and his wife moved to Denmark in 1957 where they frequently gave lecture-recitals on avant-garde music at folk high schools; making them among the first musicians to perform that genre of music in Denmark. Musicologist Jens Rossel stated that "Berg was a respected but isolated figure in Danish musical life with neither position nor pupil. Still, in 1965 Denmark's Ministry of Culture awarded Berg a lifelong artist grant and made his a Knight of the Order of the Dannebrog.

The Berg family settled in the town of Horsens on the eastern part of the Jutland peninsula in 1966. Béatrice died there ten years later, and in 1980 Berg relocated to Switzerland where he lived the rest of his life. While his music was not often performed, his music received more interest in Sweden than in earlier years. He was nominated for the Nordic Council Prize a second time for his Aria (1981). He continued to compose or revise earlier works into the year 1987.

Gunnar Berg died in Bern, Switzerland on August 25, 1989, at the age of 80.

== Legacy ==
Working Group Gunnar Berg - Agneta Mei Hytten, Erik Kaltoft and Jens Rossel - was formed after Gunnar Berg's death in 1989 by composer Tage Nielsen (1929–2003), editor and former head of the music section of DR, Mogens Andersen (1929–2008), pianist Erik Kaltoft and Jens Rossel with a view to raising awareness and understanding of Gunnar Berg's music.

The working group placed the largest part of Gunnar Berg's manuscripts and things left behind at the Royal Library in Copenhagen, released two double-CDs with historical recordings of Gunnar Berg's piano music on Danacord Records and coordinated the various activities in the centennial of Gunnar Berg's birth.

In 2009 the centennial of Gunnar Berg's birth was celebrated with concerts, radio programmes, CD-releases, writings, printed scores, and exhibitions in Denmark, Switzerland, France, Germany, Austria, United States, Ukraine and China. These activities has caused a significant change in the understanding of and respect for his artistic oeuvre - being far from a cold speculative, mathematic game.
