= Karen Holmsen =

Norwegian opera singer

Karen Holmsen (6 June 1832 – 17 January 1912) was a Norwegian opera singer. She is referred to as the perhaps first trained opera singer in Norway, and the first international opera star of her country.
