= Veikko Lavi =

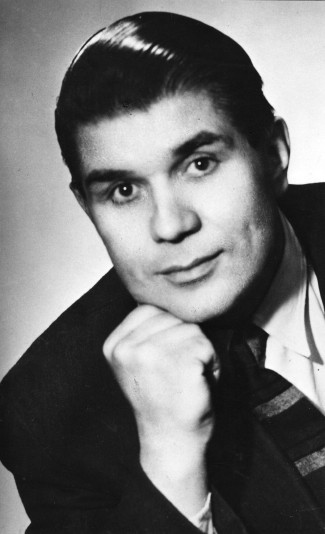
Veikko Lavi

Toivo Veikko Vepa Lavi (23 April 1912 – 22 May 1996) was a Finnish singer, songwriter and author, born in Kotka. Lavi made his first album in the early 1950s and became popular again in the late 1960s. His best known hit was perhaps Jokainen ihminen on laulun arvoinen (1976). Lavi was a prolific songwriter, renowned performer and socially active until his death in 1996, in Hamina.

== Discography ==
- Veikko Lavi 1 (1969)
- Veikko Lavi 2 (1971)
- Uusia lauluja (1974)
- Jokainen ihminen on laulun arvoinen (1976)
- Huumoria tunteella (1978)
- Lauluja elämästä (1979)
- Ruusuja ja risuja (1980)
- Ihminen - homo sapiens (1982)
- Monta ovea olen avannut (1983)
- Elämäni kronikka (1988)
- Tunnen kuuluvani tähän maahan (1992)
- Päivä kerrallaan (1994)

=== Collections ===
- Veikko Lavi (1970)
- Unohtumattomat (1979)
- Lauluntekijä (1982)
- 28 tunnetuinta (1988)
- Veikko Lavi (1988)
- Laulajan testamentti (1991)
- Unohtumattomat (1993)
- 20 suosikkia – Jokainen ihminen on laulun arvoinen (1996)
- Parhaat (1998)
- Veikko Lavi muistoissamme / Valitut palat (1999)
- 20 suosikkia – Kotkan Kerttu (2002)
- Hitit (2004)
- Nostalgia (2006)
- Veikko Lavi 1950–1952 Vol 1. (2008)
- Varis ja valtion varatyömies (2009)

=== Songwriter ===
- Punaiset ja valkoiset (1980)
- Ystävät ja viholliset (1985)
- Syylliset ja syyttömät (1987)
- Jukka Poika: Laulajan testamentti (2008)
