= Erkki Melartin =

Finnish composer (1875–1937)

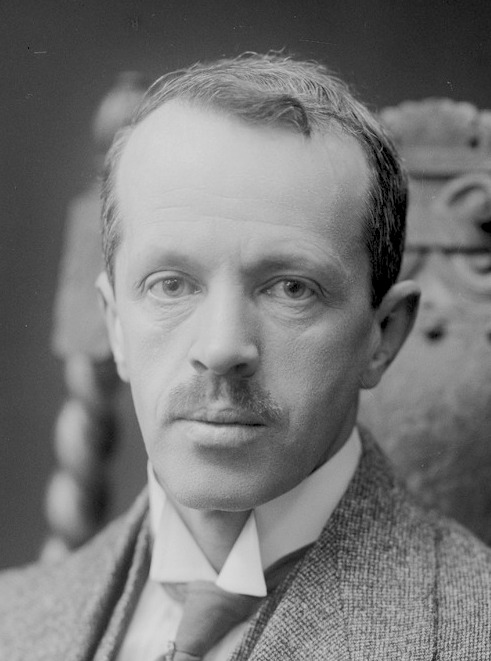
Melartin (c. 1910s)

Erkki Gustaf Melartin (7 February 1875 – 14 February 1937) was a Finnish composer, conductor, and teacher of the late-Romantic and early-modern periods. Melartin is generally considered to be one of Finland's most significant national Romantic composers, although his music—then and now—largely has been overshadowed by that of his contemporary, Jean Sibelius, the country's most famous composer. The core of Melartin's oeuvre consists of a set of six (completed) symphonies, as well as is his opera, Aino, based on a story from the Kalevala, Finland's national epic, but nevertheless in the style of Richard Wagner.

Melartin's other notable works include the popular wedding tune, Festive March (1904; from the incidental music to the play, Sleeping Beauty); the symphonic poem, Traumgesicht (1910); the Violin Concerto in D minor (1913); the Kalevalic symphonic poem for soprano and orchestra, Marjatta (1914); The Blue Pearl, Finland's first large-scale ballet (1930); and a set of four string quartets, composed between 1896 and 1910. In addition, a number of Melartin's songs for solo voice and piano have found a lasting place in the Finnish repertoire. Two additional projected symphonies, the Seventh and Eighth, might have further solidified his reputation, both within Finland and internationally, but the development of each was cut short by Melartin's death, at age 62.

== Career ==
Melartin was born in Käkisalmi. As well as composing, he also taught and directed music at the Helsinki Music College, later the Helsinki Conservatory. His students included composer and conductor Heidi Sundblad-Halme. As conductor of the Vyborg Orchestra in 1908–11, and despite chronic health problems, Melartin toured extensively (as far as North Africa and India), conducting the first performance of Gustav Mahler's music in Scandinavia, the slow movement of the Resurrection symphony in 1909.

Although Melartin was chiefly a lyricist, the symphony was central to his musical output. He wrote six symphonies (1902–1924) and was the first Finnish composer to bear Mahler's influence. The fourth symphony uses a vocalise like that of Carl Nielsen's Sinfonia Espansiva. The fifth is a Sinfonia brevis ending in a fugue and chorale, while the sixth, harmonically more advanced than the other five, advances stepwise from a C minor first movement – with evocations of Mahler's Resurrection symphony – to an E-flat major finale. His musical output also includes an opera, Aino (based on the character from the Finnish national epic, the Kalevala), a violin concerto, four string quartets, and many piano pieces. His works therefore are divided mainly into large-scale works for orchestra, and chamber pieces for much smaller groups and soloists. Despite working in the same time period as Jean Sibelius he was not influenced by the more famous composer's style, and his work has been largely overshadowed by that of Finland's most revered composer.

The Juhlamarssi (Festive March) from his ballet Sleeping Beauty is the most popular wedding march in Finland. He died in Helsinki.

== Selected compositions ==
=== Stage ===
- Aino, Opera in 2 acts, Op. 50 (1912)
- Sininen helmi (The Blue Pearl), Ballet, Op. 160 (1930)
- Prinsessa Ruusunen (Sleeping Beauty), incidental music, Op. 22 (1904)

=== Orchestral ===
- Symphony No. 1 in C minor, Op. 30 No. 1 (1902)
- Siikajoki, Symphonic Poem, Op. 28 (1903)
- Symphony No. 2 in E minor, Op. 30 No. 2 (1904)
- Prinsessa Ruusunen (Sleeping Beauty), Suite from incidental music, Op. 22 (1904, 1911)
- Symphony No. 3 in F major, Op. 40 (1906–07) / Score, preface in English
- Traumgesicht, Symphonic Poem, Op. 70 (1910) / Score, preface in English
- Patria, Symphonic Poem, Op. 72 (1911)
- Marjatta, Symphonic Song for soprano and orchestra Op. 79 (1914) / Score, preface in English
- Symphony No. 4 "Kesäsinfonia" (Summer Symphony) in E major, Op. 80 (1912) / Score, preface in English
- Lyric Suite No. 3 "Impressions de Belgique", EM144 (1915-1916)
- Symphony No. 5 "Sinfonia brevis" in A minor, Op. 90 (1915) / Score, preface in English
- Symphony No. 6, Op. 100 (1924)
- Divertimento, Op. 152 (1928)
- Intermezzo, Op. 147 (1929)
- Sininen helmi, Suite from the ballet, Op. 160 (1930)
- Symphony No. 7 "Sinfonia gaia", Op. 149 (1935–1936, part 1 ready, sketches for other parts)
- Symphony No. 8, Op. 186 (1936–1937, unfinished and fragmental)
- Symphony No. 9, Op. 188 (1930's, just some structural plans exist)
- Concerto in D minor for violin and orchestra, Op. 60 (1913)

=== Chamber music ===
- String Quartet No. 1 in E minor, Op. 36 No. 1 (1896)
- Sonata for violin and piano (1899)
- String Quartet No. 2 in G minor, Op. 36 No. 2 (1900)
- String Quartet No. 3 in E♭, Op. 36 No. 3 (1902)
- String Quartet No. 4 in F, Op. 62 (1910)
- Nocturne for violin and piano, Op. 64 No. 1
- Kuusi helppoa kappaletta (6 Easy Pieces) for cello (or violin) and piano, Op.121
- String Trio, Op. 133 (1927)
- Sonata for flute and harp, Op. 135a (1927)
- Sonata for brass, Op. 153 (1929)
- Trio for flute, clarinet and bassoon, Op. 154 (1929)
- Pieni kvartetto (Little Quartet) for four horns, Op. 185

=== Piano ===
- Marionetteja (Marionnettes), Suite for piano 4 hands, Op. 1 (1899)
- 2 Ballads, Op. 5 (1899)
- Lastuja I (Chips I), 6 pieces, Op. 7 (1900)
- 3 Pieces, Op. 8 (1899)
- Lastuja II (Chips II), 6 pieces, Op. 9 (1900)
- Skizzer, 5 Pieces, Op. 11
- Legend II, Op. 12 (1900)
- Lastuja III (Chips III), 5 pieces, Op. 34 (1906)
- Lastuja IV (Chips IV), 5 pieces, Op. 48 (1907)
- Surullinen puutarha (The Melancholy Garden), 5 Pieces, Op. 52 (1908)
- Lyric Pieces, Op. 59 (1909)
- 4 Pieces, Op. 75
- 9 Little Pieces, Op. 76
- Album Leaves, Op. 83
- 4 Sonatinas, Op. 84
- 24 Preludes, Op. 85 (1913–20)
- Noli me tangere, Op. 87 (1914)
- 3 Pieces, Op. 98 (1916?)
- Skuggspel, 7 Pieces, Op.104
- Fantasia apocaliptica, Op. 111 (1921)
- 6 Pieces, Op. 118 (1923)

No. 2 The Mysterious Forest

- 6 Pieces, Op. 123 (1924–1925)

=== Vocal ===
- 3 Songs for voice and piano, Op. 13
- Kansanlaulua Käkisalmelta (Folk Songs from Kexholm), Op. 55
- 5 Songs for voice and piano, Op. 69
- 3 Songs for voice and piano, Op. 77
- 3 Songs for voice and piano, Op. 86
- 4 Songs for voice and piano, Op. 95
