= Hugo Alfvén =

Swedish composer, conductor, violinist, and painter (1872–1960)

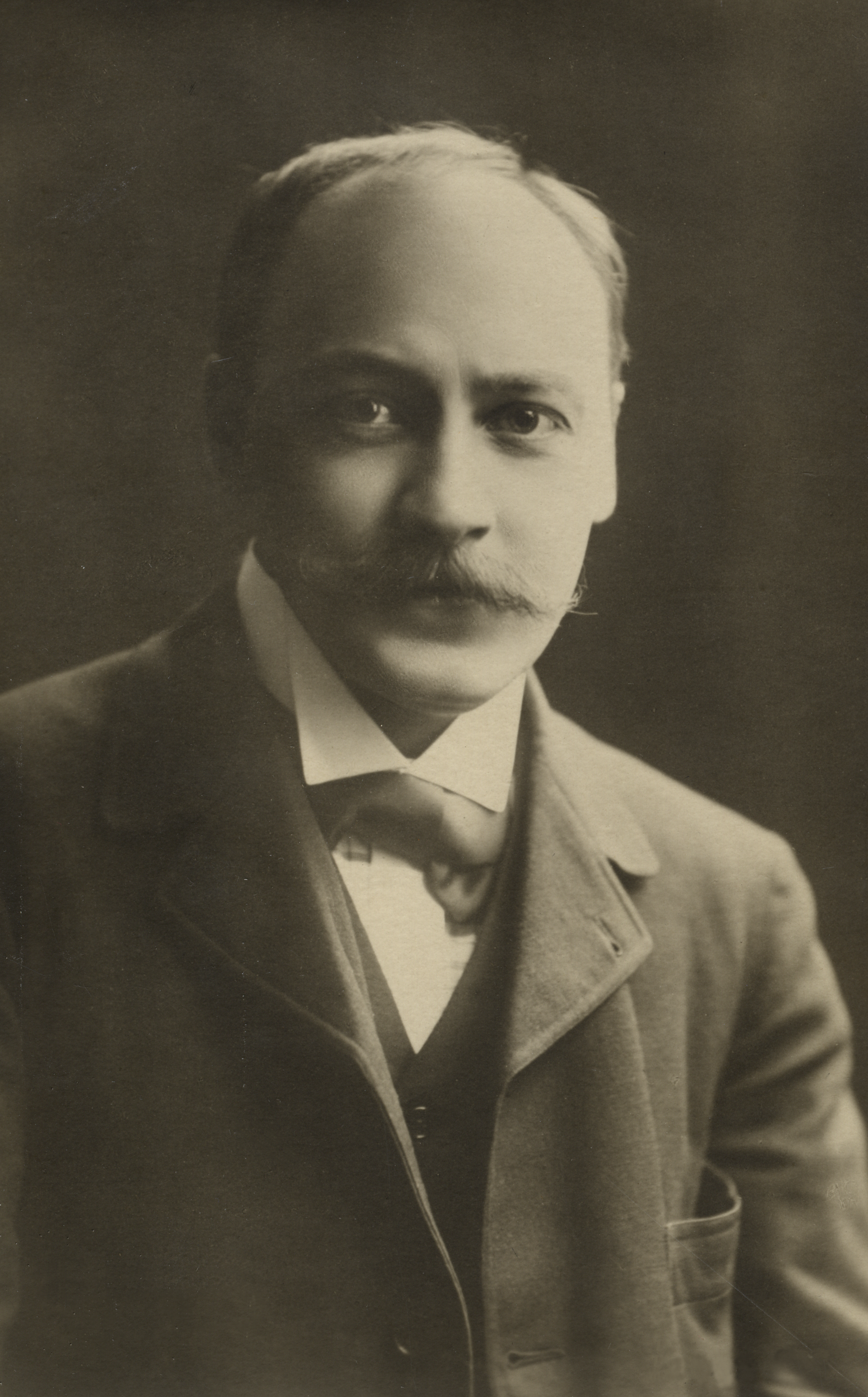
- Hugo Alfvén, c. 1906
- Born: 1 May 1872; Stockholm, Sweden
- Died: 8 May 1960 (aged 88); Falun, Sweden
- Occupations: Classical composer; conductor; violinist; painter; writer

Hugo Emil Alfvén (Swedish: [alˈveːn]; 1 May 1872 – 8 May 1960) was a Swedish composer, conductor, violinist, and painter. Alfvén was one of Sweden's principal composers. His "Swedish Rhapsody No. 1”, written when he was 31, is still one of the best-known pieces of Swedish music. After extensive European travels to develop his musical skills, Alfvén taught composition, before conducting choirs and orchestras. In 1954, he made the first Swedish classical stereo recordings. Hugo Alfvén’s extensive musical archive is held at Uppsala University, where he was music director for twenty-nine years.

== Career ==
=== Violinist ===
Alfvén was born in Stockholm, Sweden, and studied at the Royal College of Music (Kungliga Musikhögskolan) from 1887 to 1891 with the violin as his main instrument while receiving lessons from Lars Zetterquist. He also took private composition lessons from Johan Lindegren, a leading counterpoint expert. At the same time he played the violin at the Royal Opera in Stockholm 1890-1892.

=== Conductor ===
Starting in 1897, Alfvén travelled much of the next ten years in Europe. He studied violin technique in Brussels with César Thomson and learned conducting in Dresden with Hermann Ludwig Kutzschbach. In 1903-4, he was formally professor of composition at the Royal Conservatory, Stockholm. From 1910 Alfvén was Director musices (music director) at the University of Uppsala (a post he held until 1939). There he also directed the male voice choir Orphei Drängar (or 'O.D.') (until 1947). He conducted in festivals at Uppsala (1911), Dortmund (1912), Stuttgart (1913), Gothenburg (1915), and Copenhagen (1918–1919). He toured Europe as a conductor throughout his life. He received a Ph.D. honoris causa from Uppsala in 1917 and became a member of the Royal Academy of Music in Stockholm in 1908. Alfvén recorded some of his orchestral music in stereo late in 1954 (the first classical stereo recordings made in Sweden); the recordings were issued on LP in the U.S. by Westminster Records. A three-CD collection of Alfvén's recordings as a conductor has been issued.

== Music ==
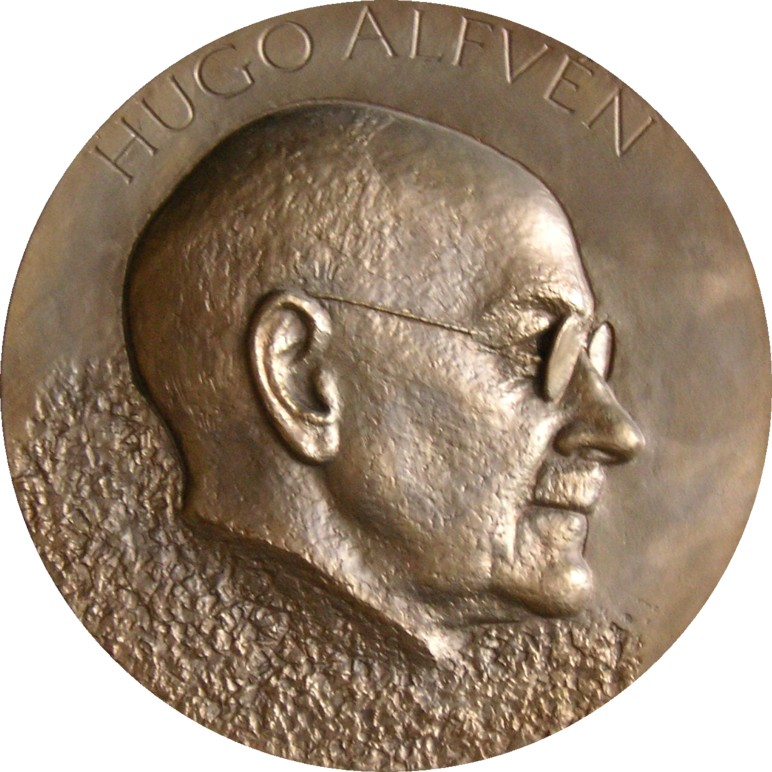
Hugo Alfvén, plaque at the Stockholm City Hall

Alfvén became known as one of Sweden's principal composers of his time, together with his contemporary Wilhelm Stenhammar. Alfvén's music is in a late Romantic idiom. His orchestration is skillful and colorful, reminiscent of that of Richard Strauss. Like Strauss, Alfvén wrote a considerable amount of program music. Some of Alfvén's music evokes the landscape of Sweden.

Among his works are a large number of pieces for male voice choir, five symphonies and three orchestral "Swedish Rhapsodies." The first of these rhapsodies, Midsommarvaka, is his best known piece.

Alfvén's five symphonies, the first four of them now several times recorded (with another cycle in progress), give a picture of the composer's musical progress. The first, in F minor, his Op. 7 from 1897, is an early work, tuneful in a standard four movements. The second, in D major (1898–99), his Op. 11 (and in a way his graduation piece, as recounted at ) concludes with a substantial, even powerful chorale-prelude and fugue in D minor. The third symphony, in E major, Op. 23 (1905), also in four movements, more mature in technique though light in manner, was inspired by a trip to Italy. The fourth symphony, in C minor, Op. 39 of 1918–9 "From the Outermost Skerries" (there is also a tone-poem, A Legend of the Skerries), is a symphony in one forty-five-minute movement using wordless voices, inspired by Carl Nielsen's Sinfonia Espansiva. The 5th, in A minor, begun 1942, is one of the composer's last works, and has been recorded only twice in full (recordings and performances of the 5th, while rare enough, are usually of its quarter-hour first movement).

Naxos Records and BIS Records among others have either collections or groups of individual recordings covering all of his symphonies and a range of his works. Brilliant Classics has licensed and re-issued the 5-CD set from BIS devoted to Alfvén that includes the symphonies and other orchestral works.

=== Swedish Rhapsody No. 1 ===
The first rhapsody – Swedish Rhapsody No. 1, also known as Midsommarvaka (Midsummer Vigil) – was written in 1903 and is often simply called the "Swedish Rhapsody." It is the best-known piece composed by Alfvén and also one of the best-known pieces of music in Sweden.

== Painter and writer ==
Alfvén's contributions were multi-dimensional and also included painting and writing. He was a talented watercolorist and once thought to devote himself entirely to painting. He also was a gifted writer. His four-volume autobiography has been called "captivating" and provides significant insight into the musical life of Sweden, in which Alfvén was a central figure for well over half a century.

== Personal life ==
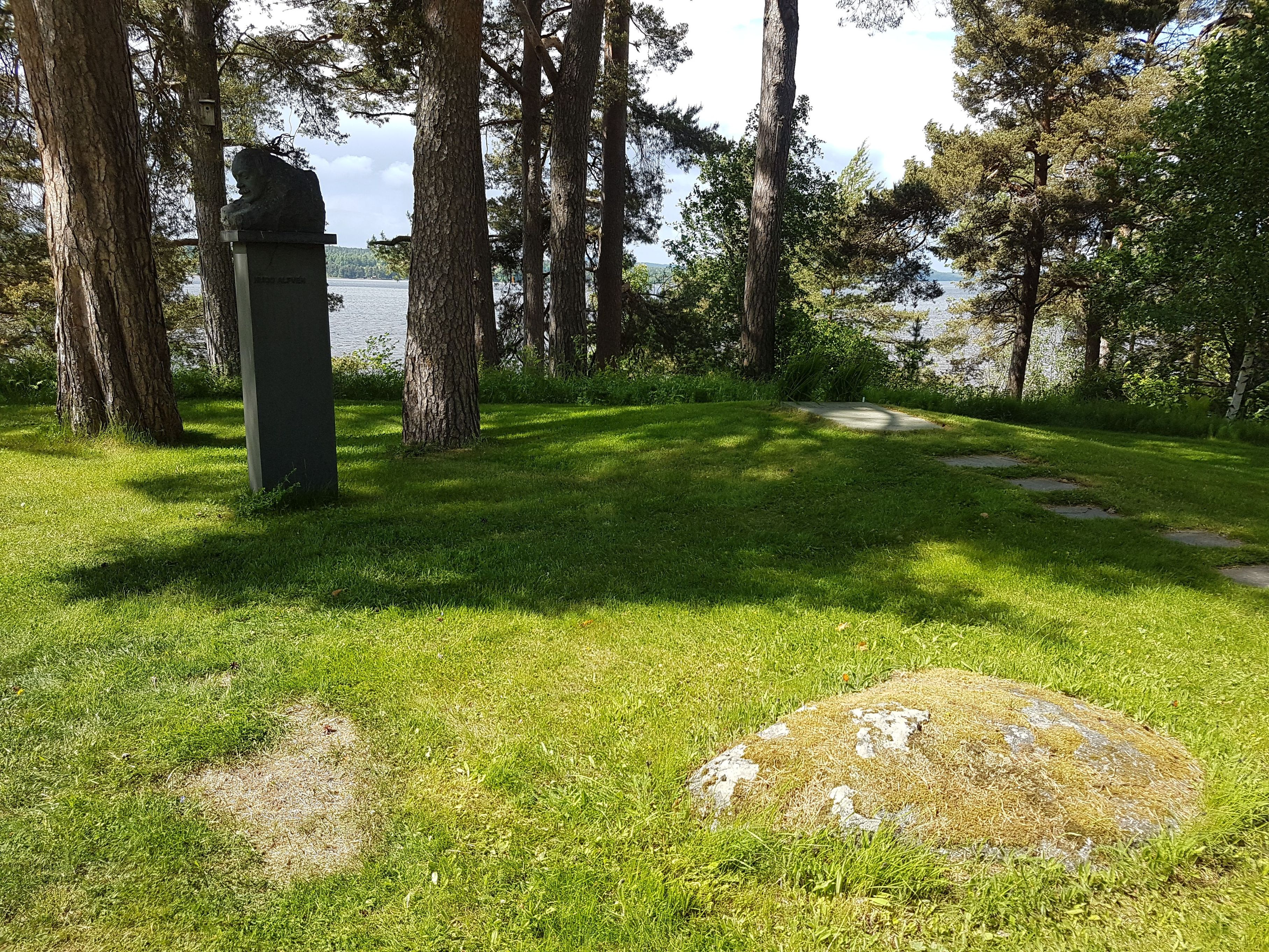
Hugo Alfven's grave in Leksand Cemetery

Alfvén was born in Stockholm, Sweden, on 1 May 1872. He was married three times. His first marriage (1912–1936) was to the Danish painter Marie Triepcke (1867–1940), who had previously been married to the painter Peder Severin Krøyer (1851–1909). After his divorce from Marie in 1936, he married Carin Wessberg (1891–1956). They were together for two decades (1936–1956) before she died. He married Anna Lund (1891–1990) in 1959. He died on 8 May 1960 in Falun, Sweden, just after his 88th birthday.

His daughter Margita Alfvén became a film star in the silent era. His nephew Hannes Alfvén received the 1970 Nobel Prize in Physics.

== List of musical works ==
When Hugo Alfvén died, his musical archive was handed over to the University of Uppsala and Jan Olof Rudén was then responsible for filing Alfvén's music, trying to create order in the chaos of a total of 214 works. The works of the composer were officially filed and opus numbered to a total of 54 musical compositions. Alfvén's works were filed according to a Rudén number along with a catalog for an opus number. Rudén has thereby attempted to classify based on other data. There still exist documents to which neither date nor Opus/Rudén number has been accorded.

In the following works below, it may be that some opus numbers contain more than one title. Opus number 48 was never used or at least recovered.

=== Orchestral ===
- Opus 7 | Rudén 24: Symphony No. 1 in F minor (Composed in 1897)
  - 1st movement: Grave – Allegro con brio
  - 2nd movement: Andante
  - 3rd movement: Allegro, molto scherzando
  - 4th movement: Allegro, ma non troppo
- Opus 11 | Rudén 28: Symphony No. 2 in D major (Composed in 1899) (Mainz 1901)
  - 1st movement: Moderato
  - 2nd movement: Andante
  - 3rd movement: Allegro
  - 4th movement: Fugue, Allegro energico
- Opus 19 | Rudén 45: Swedish Rhapsody No. 1, Midsommarvaka (Completed in 1903) (Copenhagen 1908)
- Opus 20 | Rudén 49: Symphonic poem, En skärgardssägen (First performed 1905) (Stockholm 1921)
- Opus 23 | Rudén 54: Symphony No. 3 in E major (Completed in 1905)
  - 1st Movement: Allegro con brio
  - 2nd Movement: Andante
  - 3rd Movement: Presto
  - 4th Movement: Allegro con brio
- Opus 24 | Rudén 58: Swedish Rhapsody No. 2, Uppsalarapsodi (Composed in 1907) (Stockholm 1907)
- Opus 25 | Rudén 59: Festspel for theatre (Composed in 1907) (Stockholm 1908)
- Opus 26 | Rudén 67: Fest-Ouverture (Composed in 1909)
- Opus 27 | Rudén 62: Drapa (Composed in 1908)
- Opus 37 | Rudén 99: Bergakungen (The Mountain King), ballet-pantomime (Composed in 1916 − 1923) (Stockholm 1923)
- Opus 38 | Rudén 92: Elégie (At Emil Sjögren's Funeral)
- Opus 39 | Rudén 93: Symphony No. 4 in C minor, Från havsbandet (From the Outskirts of the Archipelago) (Completed in 1919) (Vienna 1922)
  - 1st Movement: Moderato – Allegretto, ma non troppo
  - 2nd Movement: Allegro – Moderato – Allegro
  - 3rd Movement: Lento – Maestoso – Molto appassionato
  - 4th Movement: Allegro agitato
- Opus 42 | Rudén 109: Hjalmar Brantings Sorgmarsch
- Opus 47 | Rudén 120: Swedish Rhapsody No. 3, Dalarapsodi (Completed in 1931)
- Opus 49 | Rudén 121: Elegy (from Gustav II Adolf)
- Opus 52 | Rudén 201: Festival Overture
- Opus 50 | Synnöve Solbakken, Suite from the film music, after Norwegian melodies (1934)
- Opus 53 | En Bygdesaga (A Country Tale), Suite from music for the film Mans Kvinna (1944)
- Opus 54 | Rudén 209: Symphony No. 5 in A minor
  - 1st Movement: Lento – Allegro non troppo
  - 2nd Movement: Andante
  - 3rd Movement: Lento – Allegro – Presto molto agitato
  - 4th Movement: Finale: Allegro con brio
- Rudén 214: The Prodigal Son, ballet suite

=== Voice and orchestra ===
- Opus 13 | Rudén 33: The Bells, baritone and orchestra
- Opus 15 | Rudén 39: The Lord's Prayer, chorus, soloists, orchestra
- Opus 30 | Rudén 76: Ballade, baritone, male chorus and orchestra
- Opus 33 | Rudén 83: Baltic Exhibition Cantata (1914)
- Opus 40 | Rudén 98: Ode on Gustavus Vasa, soli, mixed voices, orchestra

=== Cantatas ===
- Opus 12 | Rudén: Vid sekelskiftet (At the Turn of the Century)
- Opus 31 | Rudén: Uppenbarelsekantaten (Revelation Cantata)
- Opus 36 | Rudén: Kantat vid Reformationsfesten i Uppsala 1917 (Cantata for the 1917 Reformation Festivities in Uppsala)
- Opus 45 | Rudén: Kantat vid Uppsala Universitets 450-årsjubileum (Cantata for the 450th Anniversary of Uppsala University)

=== Chamber music ===
- Opus 1 | Rudén 12: Sonata for violin and piano in C minor
- Opus 3 | Rudén 21: Romance, violin and piano
- Opus 5 | Rudén 25: Notturno Elegiaco, horn and organ
- Liten svit för soloflöjt ur Mostellaria (Little Suite for Solo Flute)

== Other ==
- piano pieces
- songs

== In popular culture ==
Hugo Alfvén is the most probable source of inspiration for the character "Karsten From" found in the novel De Dødes Rige (The Kingdom of the Dead) by Danish author Henrik Pontoppidan.
