= 1977 in music =

This is a list of notable events in music that took place in the year 1977. It marked the peak of vinyl record sales in the United States, which declined in the following decades before experiencing a resurgence in the 21st century.

== Specific locations ==
- 1977 in American music
- 1977 in British music
- 1977 in Japanese music
- 1977 in Norwegian music
- 1977 in Scandinavian music

== Specific genres ==
- 1977 in country music
- 1977 in heavy metal music
- 1977 in jazz
- 1977 in progressive rock

== Events ==
=== January–February ===
- January 1 – The Clash headline the opening night of London's only punk rock club, The Roxy.
- January 6 – After releasing only one single for controversial English punk rock band the Sex Pistols, EMI terminates its contract with them in response to the band's disruptive behaviour on ITV's Today and later at London Heathrow Airport.
- January 22 – German cellist Maria Kliegel makes her London debut at the Wigmore Hall, with a programme of Bach, Kodály, and Franck
- February 4
  - Paul Desmond gives his last concert with Dave Brubeck, in New York
  - American Bandstand celebrates its 25th anniversary on television with a special hosted by Dick Clark; an "all-star band", performing "Roll Over Beethoven", is made up of Chuck Berry, Seals & Crofts, Gregg Allman, Junior Walker, Johnny Rivers, the Pointer Sisters, Charlie Daniels, Doc Severinsen, Les McCann, Donald Byrd, Chuck Mangione and three members of Booker T and the MGs
- February 14 – The B-52's give their first public performance at a party in Athens, Georgia
- February 15 – Sid Vicious replaces Glen Matlock as the bassist of the Sex Pistols.
- February 19 – The 19th Annual Grammy Awards are presented in Los Angeles, hosted for the final time by Andy Williams. Stevie Wonder's Songs in the Key of Life wins Album of the Year, George Benson's "This Masquerade" wins Record of the Year and Barry Manilow's "I Write the Songs" wins Song of the Year. Starland Vocal Band win Best New Artist.

=== March–May ===
- March 1 – Sara Lowndes Dylan files for divorce from her husband of 11 years, Bob Dylan
- March 10 – A&M Records signs the Sex Pistols in a ceremony in front of Buckingham Palace; this contract is terminated on March 16 as a result of the band vandalizing property and verbally abusing employees during a visit to the record company's office
- April 21 – Jesse Winchester, who fled to Canada in January 1967 to avoid military service in Vietnam, performs a concert in Burlington, Vermont, his first on American soil in ten years having recently become free to return under the Presidential pardon given to all draft evaders
- April 24 – Several artists, including Joan Baez and Santana, perform at a free concert for 653 inmates of California's Soledad Prison
- April 26 – New York's disco Studio 54 opens.
- April 30 – Led Zeppelin sets a new world record attendance for an indoor solo attraction at the Pontiac Silverdome when 76,229 people attend a concert here on the group's 1977 North American Tour.
- May 2 – Elton John performs the first of six consecutive nights at London's Rainbow Theatre, his first concert in eight months
- May 7 – Having been postponed from April 2 because of a BBC technicians' strike, the 22nd Eurovision Song Contest finally goes ahead in London's Wembley Conference Centre: the winner is Marie Myriam representing France with "L'oiseau et l'enfant"; the British entry, Lynsey de Paul and Michael Moran's "Rock Bottom", comes 2nd
- May 12
  - Instruments made by all five members of the 17th- and 18th-century Guarneri family of violin makers are auctioned at Sotheby's, with the top price of £105,000 paid for an instrument made in 1738 by Giuseppe Guarneri del Gesù
  - Virgin Records announce that they have signed the Sex Pistols, the group having had contracts with two previous labels terminated in 4 months
- May 28 – Bruce Springsteen and Mike Appel reach an out-of-court settlement, ending the year-long legal battle that has blocked Springsteen's ability to record new music
- May 29 – Elvis Presley walks offstage in the middle of a concert in Baltimore, Maryland, the first time in his twenty-three year career he has done so; after receiving treatment from a physician, he reappears onstage thirty minutes later
- May 31 – The musical Beatlemania is premièred at the Winter Garden Theatre on Manhattan

=== June–August ===
- June 7
  - The Nikikai Opera Foundation is founded in Japan
  - The Sex Pistols attempt to interrupt Silver Jubilee celebrations for Queen Elizabeth II by performing their version of "God Save the Queen" from a boat on the River Thames
- June 12
  - Guitarist Michael Schenker vanishes after a UFO concert at The Roundhouse in London (he is replaced for several months by Paul Chapman)
  - The Supremes perform for the last time together at Drury Lane Theatre in London before officially disbanding.
- June 15 – The Snape Maltings Training Orchestra makes its London debut at St John's, Smith Square, London.
- June 18 – The first St Magnus Festival of the Arts, founded in Orkney by local resident, composer Sir Peter Maxwell Davies, opens with Davies's opera The Martyrdom of St Magnus.
- June 20 – Grateful Dead drummer Mickey Hart drives his Porsche over the edge of a canyon, suffering multiple broken bones but surviving as a tree breaks his fall.
- June 26 – Elvis Presley gives his final concert, at Market Square Arena, Indianapolis, Indiana, United States. Earlier that day, he has received a plaque commemorating the two billionth pressing from RCA's record pressing plant in Camden, New Jersey.
- July 9 – Donna Summer's hit record "I Feel Love" is released in the UK; it is the first hit record to have an entirely synthesised backing track.
- July 13 – After a massive blackout hits New York City, NRBQ manages to play an all-acoustic set at The Bottom Line with flashlights taped to their microphone stands.
- July 22 – The first night of The Proms are broadcast in quadraphonic sound by BBC Radio 3 for the first time
- July 26 – Led Zeppelin cancels the last seven dates of their American tour after lead singer Robert Plant learns that his six-year-old son Karac has died of a respiratory virus (The show two days before in Oakland proves to be the band's last in the United States)
- August 16 – Bing Crosby gives his final concert, in Brighton, UK, accompanied by Johnny Smith.
- August 17 – Florists Transworld Delivery (FTD) reports that in one day the number of orders for flowers to be delivered to Graceland for the funeral of Elvis Presley has surpassed the number for any other event in the company's history.
- August 18 – The funeral of Elvis Presley takes place at Graceland.
- August 20 – NASA's uncrewed probe Voyager 2 is launched carrying a golden record containing sounds and images representing life and culture on Earth, including the first movements of J. S. Bach's Brandenburg Concerto and Beethoven's Fifth Symphony, Guan Pinghu's Liu Shui, played on the guqin, and Chuck Berry's "Johnny B. Goode".

=== September–December ===
- September 1 – World première at the Royal Albert Hall in London of the expanded version of Luciano Berio's Coro
- September 3 – Nearly 110,000 fans pack Englishtown Raceway in Old Bridge, New Jersey, United States, for an 11-hour concert by Grateful Dead, Marshall Tucker Band and New Riders of the Purple Sage.
- September 15 – The third – and final – annual Rock Music Awards aired on NBC (Fleetwood Mac dominates, winning five awards while Linda Ronstadt receives the Best Rock Female Vocalist trophy for the third time
- October 3 – Elvis in Concert, a TV concert special filmed during Elvis Presley's final tour and released posthumously, is aired on CBS; Canadian Channel CKND-DT simulcasts it.
- October 5 – The bicentennial season of La Scala opens in Milan with a production of Giuseppe Verdi's Don Carlo.
- October 9 – Aerosmith cancels several tour dates after Joe Perry and Steven Tyler are injured by an M-80 explosive thrown onstage at the Philadelphia Spectrum, burning Tyler's left cornea and cutting Perry's left hand
- October 20 – A plane carrying Lynyrd Skynyrd crashes in a forest in Mississippi, killing songwriter & vocalist Ronnie Van Zant, guitarist Steve Gaines, background vocalist Cassie Gaines and assistant road manager Dean Kilpatrick and seriously injuring many of the remaining band members.
- October 28
  - British punk band Sex Pistols release Never Mind the Bollocks, Here's the Sex Pistols on the Virgin Records label. Despite refusal by major UK retailers to stock it, it debuts at number one on the UK Album Charts the week after its release. In a promotional stunt the group perform on a boat on the River Thames shortly afterwards, only for the police to wait for them and make several arrests, including that of Malcolm McLaren, the band's manager at this time.
  - British rock band Queen release the album News of the World.
- October 31 – The original version of Karlheinz Stockhausen's Jahreslauf is premièred at the National Theatre of Japan in Chiyoda, Tokyo, by the Imperial Gagaku Ensemble
- November 12 – The 6th OTI Festival, held at the Centro Cultural de la Villa de Madrid auditorium, in Madrid, Spain, is won by the song "Quincho Barrilete", written by Carlos Mejía Godoy, and performed by Guayo González representing Nicaragua.
- November 25 – 10 Years of Rolling Stone, a television special commemorating the tenth anniversary of Rolling Stone magazine, airs on CBS in the United States; guests include Bette Midler, Art Garfunkel, Billy Preston, Melissa Manchester and Keith Moon
- November 30 – Bing Crosby's final Christmas television special, Bing Crosby's Merrie Olde Christmas, airs on CBS (containing the notable segment of Crosby joined by David Bowie for the duet "Peace on Earth/Little Drummer Boy")
- December 14 – Saturday Night Fever appears in movie theaters, igniting a new popularity for disco music and pushing it to the forefront of American pop culture, with the soundtrack to the film by Bee Gees (who have composed most of the tracks)
- December 17 – Elvis Costello makes his American television début on Saturday Night Live as a last-minute replacement for the Sex Pistols, who were refused visas to enter America; Costello is banned after substituting the scheduled performance of "Less than Zero" with "Radio, Radio" instead
- December 31 – The sixth annual New Year's Rockin' Eve special airs on ABC and the United States, with performances by Ohio Players, Crystal Gayle, Kenny Rogers, KC and the Sunshine Band and Andy Gibb

=== Also in 1977 ===
- "Bohemian Rhapsody" named "The Best Single Of The Last 25 Years" by BPI.
- The Badisches Staatstheater Karlsruhe begins its annual festival based on the music of George Frideric Handel.
- Luigi Sagrati becomes president of the Unione Musicisti di Roma.
- The IRCAM Center, a scientific institute for music and sound and avant-garde electro-acoustical art music, opens in Paris.

== Bands formed ==
- See Category:Musical groups established in 1977

== Bands reformed ==
- See Category:Musical groups reestablished in 1977

== Bands disbanded ==
- See Category:Musical groups disestablished in 1977

== Albums released ==
=== January ===
Day	Album	Artist	Notes
7	Queens of Noise	The Runaways	-
7	Flight Log	Jefferson Airplane	Compilation
10	Hard Again	Muddy Waters	-
10	Leave Home	Ramones	-
14	Ahh... The Name Is Bootsy, Baby!	Bootsy's Rubber Band	-
14	Low	David Bowie	-
18	Deep in My Soul	Smokey Robinson	-
18	An Evening with Diana Ross	Diana Ross	Live
18	Playing the Fool	Gentle Giant	Live
20	Changes in Latitudes, Changes in Attitudes	Jimmy Buffett	-
21	Animals	Pink Floyd	-
22	Sleeping Gypsy	Michael Franks	-
-	Dreams, Dreams, Dreams	Chilliwack	-
-	Festival	Santana	-
-	Forever for Now	April Wine	-
-	Fountains of Light	Starcastle	-
-	Joe Ely	Joe Ely	-
-	Kenny Rogers	Kenny Rogers	-
-	The Last Gunfighter Ballad	Johnny Cash	-
-	The Light of Smiles	Gary Wright	-
-	Lost Without Your Love	Bread	-
-	Miracle Row	Janis Ian	-
-	Novella	Renaissance	US
-	Sammy Hagar	Sammy Hagar	-
-	Cardiac Arrest	Cameo	Debut

=== February ===
Day	Album	Artist	Notes
4	Cheap Trick	Cheap Trick	Debut
4	Rumours	Fleetwood Mac	US
4	Ra	Utopia	-
4	The World Starts Tonight	Bonnie Tyler	Debut
4	Love at the Greek	Neil Diamond	Live
8	Marquee Moon	Television	Debut
11	Bullinamingvase	Roy Harper	-
11	New Harvest – First Gathering	Dolly Parton	-
11	Songs from the Wood	Jethro Tull	-
15	Fingerprince	The Residents	-
18	Damned Damned Damned	The Damned	Debut
18	Don't Waste It	Jo Jo Zep & The Falcons	Debut
18	Glorious	Gloria Gaynor	-
21	(I'm) Stranded	The Saints	-
22	Unpredictable	Natalie Cole	-
25	Peter Gabriel	Peter Gabriel	Solo debut
25	Something Magic	Procol Harum	-
25	Ultravox!	Ultravox	Debut
-	In Your Mind	Bryan Ferry	-
-	Sleepwalker	The Kinks	-
-	Stay in Love	Minnie Riperton	-
-	Body Love	Klaus Schulze	Soundtrack
-	Next	Journey	-
-	On Earth as It Is in Heaven	Angel	-
-	A Place in the Sun	Pablo Cruise	-
-	Sunshine	Dragon	-
-	Southern Nights	Glen Campbell	-
-	Freeways	Bachman–Turner Overdrive	-
-	Victim of Romance	Michelle Phillips	-

=== March ===
Day	Album	Artist	Notes
4	Live!	Status Quo	-
4	Malice in Wonderland	Paice Ashton Lord	-
8	Foreigner	Foreigner	US
8	Go for Your Guns	The Isley Brothers	-
11	Dandy in the Underworld	T.Rex	-
15	Islands	The Band	-
15	Live at the London Palladium	Marvin Gaye	Live
17	Welcome to My World	Elvis Presley	Compilation
18	The Idiot	Iggy Pop	-
18	Every Face Tells a Story	Cliff Richard	-
21	Let There Be Rock	AC/DC	Australia
21	Whatever Happened to Slade	Slade	-
25	Works Volume 1	Emerson, Lake & Palmer	
30	Commodores	Commodores	-
-	Live: You Get What You Play For	REO Speedwagon	-
-	Jeff Beck with the Jan Hammer Group Live	Jeff Beck and the Jan Hammer Group	Live
-	Saw Delight	Can	-
-	Off the Record	Sweet	-
-	Trans-Europe Express	Kraftwerk	-
-	Heavy Weather	Weather Report	-
-	Harbor	America	-
-	I Came to Dance	Nils Lofgren	-
-	Love Storm	Tavares	-
-	Angel	Ohio Players	-
-	Anytime...Anywhere	Rita Coolidge	-

=== April ===
Day	Album	Artist	Notes
4	Clear Air Turbulence	Ian Gillan Band	
4	Ask Rufus	Rufus	-
8	Even in the Quietest Moments	Supertramp	
8	The Clash	The Clash	-
8	Sin After Sin	Judas Priest	-
11	Love You	The Beach Boys	-
13	Celebrate Me Home	Kenny Loggins	-
15	Rattus Norvegicus	The Stranglers	-
15	Lace and Whiskey	Alice Cooper	-
29	To You All	Krokus	-
30	Caught Live + 5	The Moody Blues	Live + unreleased material, 1969
-	Come In from the Rain	Captain & Tennille	-
-	Detective	Detective	-
-	Elegant Gypsy	Al Di Meola	-
-	Future Games	Spirit	-
-	Get It	Dave Edmunds	-
-	Izitso	Cat Stevens	-
-	Let It Flow	Dave Mason	-
-	Magic Fly	Space	-
-	Mirage	Klaus Schulze	-
-	Moroccan Roll	Brand X	-
-	Ol' Waylon	Waylon Jennings	-
-	Over	Peter Hammill	-
-	A Period of Transition	Van Morrison	-
-	Phyllis Hyman	Phyllis Hyman	-
-	Police and Thieves	Junior Murvin	-
-	Sweet Forgiveness	Bonnie Raitt	-
-	Taking Off	Neil Innes	-
-	VSOP	Herbie Hancock	-
-	Windy City Breakdown	Jonathan Cain	-

=== May ===
Day	Album	Artist	Notes
4	The Beatles at the Hollywood Bowl	The Beatles	Live 1964–'65
5	Live: P-Funk Earth Tour	Parliament	-
6	White Snake	David Coverdale	
6	Holly Days	Denny Laine	-
13	I Remember Yesterday	Donna Summer	-
13	One of the Boys	Roger Daltrey	-
13	Overnight Angels	Ian Hunter	-
10	Right on Time	The Brothers Johnson	-
16	High Class in Borrowed Shoes	Max Webster	-
20	In the City	The Jam	-
20	Spot the Pigeon	Genesis	EP
27	Free Fall	Dixie Dregs	-
27	Look to the Rainbow	Al Jarreau	Live
-	Lights Out	UFO	-
-	Little Queen	Heart	-
-	38 Special	38 Special	-
-	Barry Manilow Live	Barry Manilow	Live
-	Book of Dreams	Steve Miller Band	-
-	Cat Scratch Fever	Ted Nugent	-
-	Deceptive Bends	10cc	-
-	Here at Last... Bee Gees... Live	Bee Gees	Live
-	Indian Summer	Poco	-
-	Hurry Sundown	Outlaws	-
-	Live at the Old Quarter, Houston, Texas	Townes Van Zandt	Live
-	Love for Sale	Boney M	-
-	My Own Way to Rock	Burton Cummings	-
-	Nether Lands	Dan Fogelberg	-
-	Now	The Tubes	-
-	Playin' Up a Storm	The Gregg Allman Band	-
-	Prism	Prism	-
-	Rendezvous	Sandy Denny	-
-	Sneakin' Suspicion	Dr. Feelgood	-
-	Time Loves a Hero	Little Feat	-
-	Travelin' at the Speed of Thought	The O'Jays	-

=== June ===
Day	Album	Artist	Notes
1	Shaun Cassidy	Shaun Cassidy	Solo Debut
3	I'm in You	Peter Frampton	
3	Exodus	Bob Marley & The Wailers	-
8	Knock 'Em Dead Kid	Trooper	-
9	Monkey Island	The J. Geils Band	-
13	American Stars 'n Bars	Neil Young	-
15	In City Dreams	Robin Trower	-
15	Reencuentro	José José	-
15	Suspiria	Goblin	Soundtrack
15	You Light Up My Life	Debby Boone	Solo Debut
17	CSN	Crosby, Stills & Nash	-
17	Quark, Strangeness and Charm	Hawkwind	-
17	Love Gun	Kiss	-
20	Ram Jam	Ram Jam	Debut
22	JT	James Taylor	-
24	We Must Believe in Magic	Crystal Gayle	-
29	Feel the Fire	Jermaine Jackson	-
-	Blowin' Away	Joan Baez	-
-	Full House	Frankie Miller	-
-	Live at Last	Bette Midler	Live
-	Making a Good Thing Better	Olivia Newton-John	-
-	Photoplay	Sherbet	-
-	Pure Mania	The Vibrators	Debut
-	Season of Lights	Laura Nyro	Live
-	Star Wars	John Williams	Soundtrack
-	Steve Winwood	Steve Winwood	-
-	Superman	Barbra Streisand	-
-	To Lefty from Willie	Willie Nelson	-
-	Tormé: A New Album	Mel Tormé	-
-	Watercolors	Pat Metheny	-

=== July ===
Day	Album	Artist	Notes
7	On Stage	Rainbow	Live
7	The Grand Illusion	Styx	-
8	Face to Face: A Live Recording	Steve Harley & Cockney Rebel	-
8	I Robot	The Alan Parsons Project	
11	Village People	Village People	mini-album debut
12	Going for the One	Yes	US
15	Luna Sea	Firefall	-
22	From Here to Eternity	Giorgio Moroder	-
22	Leif Garrett	Leif Garrett	-
22	My Aim Is True	Elvis Costello	-
27	Terrapin Station	Grateful Dead	-
29	Game, Dames and Guitar Thangs	Eddie Hazel	-
29	In Full Bloom	Rose Royce	-
-	Daytime Friends	Kenny Rogers	-
-	It's a Game	Bay City Rollers	-
-	Knnillssonn	Harry Nilsson	-
-	Live! In the Air Age	Be-Bop Deluxe	Live
-	Moody Blue	Elvis Presley	-
-	Play Me Out	Glenn Hughes	-
-	Radios Appear	Radio Birdman	-
-	The Rambler	Johnny Cash	-
-	Simple Things	Carole King	-
-	The Whole Thing's Started	Air Supply	-

=== August ===
Day	Album	Artist	Notes
1	Tasty	The Shadows	-
5	Dry & Heavy	Burning Spear	-
12	Motörhead	Motörhead	
12	Playmates	Small Faces	-
13	Live in Japan	The Runaways	-
16	George Thorogood and the Destroyers	George Thorogood and the Destroyers	Debut
19	Foghat Live	Foghat	Live
19	Livin' on the Fault Line	The Doobie Brothers	-
19	Patti LaBelle	Patti LaBelle	Solo Debut
22	Pacific Ocean Blue	Dennis Wilson	-
29	A Farewell to Kings	Rush	-
29	Dizrythmia	Split Enz	-
30	Barry White Sings for Someone You Love	Barry White	-
-	The Angels	The Angels	Australia
-	Before We Were So Rudely Interrupted	The Animals	-
-	Boats Against the Current	Eric Carmen	-
-	Brothers	Taj Mahal	Soundtrack
-	Donald Clark Osmond	Donny Osmond	-
-	Donovan	Donovan	-
-	Firing on All Six	Lone Star	-
-	Live	Golden Earring	Live
-	Nothin' but the Blues	Johnny Winter	-
-	Rock 'n' Roll with the Modern Lovers	Jonathan Richman and the Modern Lovers	-
-	Showtime	Ry Cooder	-
-	Radio Special	The Residents	Promo only, officially released 1983

=== September ===
Day	Album	Artist	Notes
1	Enigmatic Ocean	Jean-Luc Ponty	-
2	Bad Reputation	Thin Lizzy	-
7	Twilley Don't Mind	Dwight Twilley	-
9	Lust for Life	Iggy Pop	-
12	Chicago XI	Chicago	-
13	Elton John's Greatest Hits Volume II	Elton John	Compilation
13	Foreign Affairs	Tom Waits	-
16	Baby It's Me	Diana Ross	-
16	Rough Mix	Pete Townshend and Ronnie Lane	-
16	Talking Heads: 77	Talking Heads	-
23	Aja	Steely Dan	-
23	The Boys	The Boys	Debut
23	Little Criminals	Randy Newman	-
23	Love You Live	The Rolling Stones	Live
23	No More Heroes	The Stranglers	-
23	Passage	Carpenters	-
29	The Stranger	Billy Joel	-
30	New Boots and Panties!!	Ian Dury	-
30	Ringo the 4th	Ringo Starr	-
-	Beauty on a Back Street	Hall & Oates	-
-	Dance Band on the Titanic	Harry Chapin	-
-	Blank Generation	Richard Hell and the Voidoids	-
-	The Boomtown Rats	The Boomtown Rats	-
-	Broken Heart	The Babys	-
-	Flowing Rivers	Andy Gibb	-
-	Gone to Earth	Barclay James Harvest	-
-	Hope	Klaatu	-
-	In Color	Cheap Trick	-
-	Intakes	Rick Nelson and the Stone Canyon Band	-
-	Motivation Radio	Steve Hillage	-
-	Simple Dreams	Linda Ronstadt	-
-	Supernature (Cerrone III)	Cerrone	-
-	What a Long Strange Trip It's Been	Grateful Dead	Compilation

=== October ===
Day	Album	Artist	Notes
1	Born Late	Shaun Cassidy	-
3	Elvis in Concert	Elvis Presley	Live, Soundtrack
3	L.A.M.F.	Johnny Thunders & The Heartbreakers	-
7	3D – EP	XTC	EP
7	Bright Lights & Back Alleys	Smokie	-
7	Midnight Wind	The Charlie Daniels Band	-
7	Scarabus	Ian Gillan Band	-
11	Point of Know Return	Kansas	-
14	Seconds Out	Genesis	Live
14	Alive II	Kiss	Live + 5 new studio tracks
14	Ha!-Ha!-Ha!	Ultravox	-
14	"Heroes"	David Bowie	-
17	Consequences	Godley & Creme	-
17	Street Survivors	Lynyrd Skynyrd	-
17	Waitin' for the Night	The Runaways	-
18	Goin' Places	The Jacksons	
21	Bat Out of Hell	Meat Loaf	-
25	Once Upon a Time	Donna Summer	-
25	Watermark	Art Garfunkel	-
28	Never Mind the Bollocks, Here's the Sex Pistols	Sex Pistols	-
28	News of the World	Queen	-
28	Out of the Blue	Electric Light Orchestra	
28	Decade	Neil Young	Compilation
29	Menagerie	Bill Withers	-
31	Crosby–Nash Live	Crosby & Nash	Live
-	Citadel	Starcastle	-
-	Commodores Live!	Commodores	-
-	The Golden Greats	Sweet	Compilation
-	Introducing Sparks	Sparks	-
-	Send It	Ashford & Simpson	-
-	Here You Come Again	Dolly Parton	-
-	Levon Helm & the RCO All-Stars	Levon Helm	-
-	Moonflower	Santana	-
-	Musical Chairs	Sammy Hagar	-
-	Night After Night	Nils Lofgren	Live
-	Oops! Wrong Planet	Utopia	-
-	Show Some Emotion	Joan Armatrading	-
-	Stick to Me	Graham Parker and the Rumour	-
-	Thunder in My Heart	Leo Sayer	-
-	True to Life	Ray Charles	-
-	Young Loud and Snotty	Dead Boys	-

=== November ===
Day	Album	Artist	Notes
3	Rock & Roll Machine	Triumph	-
4	Foot Loose & Fancy Free	Rod Stewart	-
4	One World	John Martyn	-
4	Rocket to Russia	The Ramones	-
10	Rock City	Riot	-
11	Gør det noget	Gasolin'	-
11	I'm Glad You're Here with Me Tonight	Neil Diamond	-
14	Manorisms	Wet Willie	-
15	Saturday Night Fever	Bee Gees et al.	Soundtrack
16	Thankful	Natalie Cole	-
17	Broken Blossom	Bette Midler	-
18	Livestock	Brand X	Live
18	Music for Pleasure	The Damned	-
18	This Is the Modern World	The Jam	-
21	All 'n All	Earth, Wind & Fire	-
22	Chic	Chic	-
25	Works Volume 2	Emerson, Lake & Palmer	-
25	Slowhand	Eric Clapton	-
25	The Best of ZZ Top	ZZ Top	Compilation
25	Whip It Out	Jo Jo Zep & The Falcons	
28	Funkentelechy Vs. the Placebo Syndrome	Parliament	-
-	Down Two Then Left	Boz Scaggs	-
-	Expect No Mercy	Nazareth	-
-	Galaxy	War	-
-	Greatest Hits, Etc.	Paul Simon	Compilation + 2 new tracks
-	Death of a Ladies' Man	Leonard Cohen	-
-	Further Temptations	The Drones	-
-	I Want to Live	John Denver	-
-	Innocent Victim	Uriah Heep	-
-	It Takes One to Know One	Detective	-
-	Joe Cocker's Greatest Hits	Joe Cocker	Compilation
-	New Horizon	Isaac Hayes	-
-	Kill City	Iggy Pop & James Williamson	-
-	Race With the Devil	Black Oak Arkansas	-
-	Recycled	Edgar Winter's White Trash	-
-	Rick Wakeman's Criminal Record	Rick Wakeman	-
-	Rockin' All Over the World	Status Quo	-
-	Running Free	Dragon	-
-	The Second Annual Report	Throbbing Gristle	-
-	Spectres	Blue Öyster Cult	-
-	Storm Force Ten	Steeleye Span	-
-	Touch and Gone	Gary Wright	-

=== December ===
Day	Album	Artist	Notes
6	The Belle Album	Al Green	-
6	Running on Empty	Jackson Browne	-
9	Draw the Line	Aerosmith	
9	Scouse the Mouse	Ringo Starr	Children's
12	ABBA: The Album	ABBA	-
13	Blue Lights in the Basement	Roberta Flack	-
13	Don Juan's Reckless Daughter	Joni Mitchell	-
20	Life on the Line	Eddie and the Hot Rods	-
-	The Alice Cooper Show	Alice Cooper	Live
-	Dark Album	Wigwam	
-	Taken by Force	Scorpions	-
-	Björk	Björk Guðmundsdóttir	-
-	All in the Name of Love	John Hartford	-
-	Before and After Science	Brian Eno	-
-	The Best of Top of the Pops '77	Top of the Poppers	Compilation
-	Body Love Vol. 2	Klaus Schulze	Soundtrack
-	Eddie Money	Eddie Money	-
-	Mr. Mean	Ohio Players	-
-	Pink Flag	Wire	-
-	Spiral	Vangelis	-
-	Suicide	Suicide	-

=== Release date unknown ===
- 15 Years On – The Dubliners
- Alien Soundtracks – Chrome
- Aliens – Horslips
- American Roulette – Danny O'Keefe
- Be Seeing You – Dr. Feelgood
- Black Vinyl Shoes – Shoes
- Blue Hotel – Fox
- BTO Live – Japan Tour (live) – Bachman–Turner Overdrive
- Bundle of Joy – Freddie Hubbard
- Byablue – Keith Jarrett
- Cabretta – Mink DeVille
- Calling on Youth – The Outsiders
- Circles in the Stream – Bruce Cockburn – Live
- Close Encounters of the Third Kind: Original Motion Picture Soundtrack – John Williams
- Cluster & Eno – Cluster & Eno
- Come and Join Us – Petra
- Come to Me – Juice Newton and Silver Spur
- Coming Back for More – William Bell
- Dark Magus – Miles Davis – Live 1974
- The David Grisman Quintet - David Grisman
- Delilah's Power – Ike & Tina Turner
- Derringer Live – Derringer – Live
- The Diodes – The Diodes
- East of the River Nile – Augustus Pablo
- Encore – Tangerine Dream
- Equal Rights – Peter Tosh
- Evolution (The Most Recent) - Taj Mahal
- Fandango – Fandango
- Feelin' Bitchy – Millie Jackson
- The Giants – Oscar Peterson, Joe Pass, Ray Brown
- Gleanings – John Coltrane
- Glitter Grass from the Nashwood Hollyville Strings - John Hartford, Doug Dillard, Rodney Dillard
- Goddo – Goddo
- Graham Bonnet – Graham Bonnet
- The Guitar Syndicate – Hank Marvin
- Halloween – Pulsar
- Heart of the Congos – The Congos
- Home on the Range – Slim Whitman
- I'm a Man – Bo Diddley
- If Wishes Were Horses – Sweeney Todd
- It Feels So Good – The Manhattans
- Just a Stone's Throw Away – Valerie Carter
- Just a Story from America – Elliott Murphy
- A Little Street Music – Cambridge Buskers
- Live at the El Mocambo – April Wine
- Live at Montreux – The Dubliners
- A Maid in Bedlam – John Renbourn Group
- Majida El Roumi – Majida El Roumi
- Makin' Magic – Pat Travers
- Manifest Destiny – The Dictators
- Marin County Line – New Riders of the Purple Sage
- Mark Farner – Mark Farner
- Malcolm Rebenneck - Dr. John
- Marlena – Die Flippers
- Message Man – Eddy Grant
- Montreux '77 – Ella Fitzgerald
- Music Fuh Ya' (Musica Para Tu) - Taj Mahal
- Never Letting Go – Phoebe Snow
- The Night Tripper - Dr. John
- Nice to Be Around – Rosemary Clooney
- Off the Wall - Roger Miller
- The Original Disco Duck – Rick Dees
- 'A paggella – Mario Trevi
- Painted Poetry - Roger Miller
- Peter McCann – Peter McCann
- Playing to an Audience of One – David Soul
- Protest – Bunny Wailer
- Putting It Straight – Pat Travers
- Richard Clayderman – Richard Clayderman
- Rick Danko – Rick Danko
- Ridin' High – Moxy
- Sergio Franchi / Volare – Sergio Franchi (RCA 15th Anniv. Tribute to Franchi)
- Songs of Kristofferson – Kris Kristofferson
- Sweet Evil – Derringer
- Tanz Samba mit Mir – Tony Holiday
- Telling the Truth – Willie Wright
- Two Sevens Clash – Culture
- Unmistakably Lou – Lou Rawls
- Visitors – Automatic Man
- When You Hear Lou, You've Heard It All – Lou Rawls
- Young Men Gone West – City Boy
- You Think You Really Know Me - Gary Wilson

== Chronological table of US and UK and Japan number one hit singles ==
US number one singles and artist (weeks at number one)	UK number one singles and artist (weeks at number one)
"Tonight's the Night" – Rod Stewart (7 weeks in 1976 + 1 week in 1977)	"When a Child Is Born" – Johnny Mathis (1 week in 1976 + 2 weeks in 1977)
"You Don't Have to Be a Star (To Be in My Show)"- Marilyn McCoo & Billy Davis Jr. (1)	"Don't Give Up on Us" – David Soul (4)
"You Make Me Feel Like Dancing" – Leo Sayer (1)	"Don't Cry for Me Argentina" – Julie Covington (1)
"I Wish" – Stevie Wonder (1)	"When I Need You" – Leo Sayer (3)
"Car Wash" – Rose Royce (1)	"Chanson D'Amour" – The Manhattan Transfer (3)
"Torn Between Two Lovers" – Mary MacGregor (2)	"Knowing Me, Knowing You" – ABBA (5)
"Blinded by the Light" – Manfred Mann's Earth Band (1)	"Free" – Deniece Williams (2)
"New Kid in Town" – The Eagles (1)	"I Don't Want to Talk About It/The First Cut Is the Deepest" – Rod Stewart (4)
"Love theme from A Star Is Born (Evergreen)" – Barbra Streisand (3)	"Lucille" – Kenny Rogers (1)
"Rich Girl" – Hall & Oates (2)	"Show You the Way to Go" – The Jacksons (1)
"Dancing Queen" – ABBA (1)	"So You Win Again" – Hot Chocolate (3)
"Don't Give Up on Us" – David Soul (1)	"I Feel Love" – Donna Summer (4)
"Don't Leave Me This Way" – Thelma Houston (1)	"Angelo" – Brotherhood of Man (1)
"Southern Nights" – Glen Campbell (1)	"Float On" – The Floaters (1)
"Hotel California" – Eagles (1)	"Way Down" – Elvis Presley (5)
"When I Need You" – Leo Sayer (1)	"Silver Lady" – David Soul (3)
"Sir Duke" – Stevie Wonder (3)	"Yes Sir I Can Boogie" – Baccara (1)
"I'm Your Boogie Man" – KC and the Sunshine Band (1)	"The Name of the Game" – ABBA (4)
"Dreams" – Fleetwood Mac (1)	"Mull Of Kintyre / Girls' School" – Wings, (5 weeks in 1977 + 4 weeks in 1978), best selling single of the year
"Got to Give It Up" – Marvin Gaye (1)
"Gonna Fly Now (Theme From Rocky)" – Bill Conti (1)
"Undercover Angel" – Alan O'Day (1)
"Da Doo Ron Ron" – Shaun Cassidy (1)
"Looks Like We Made It" – Barry Manilow (1)
"I Just Want to Be Your Everything" – Andy Gibb (4)
"Best of My Love" – The Emotions (5)
"Star Wars Theme/Cantina Band" – Meco (2)
"You Light Up My Life" – Debby Boone (10), biggest hit of the 1970s
"How Deep Is Your Love" – Bee Gees (2 weeks in 1977 + 1 week in 1978)

Japanese Oricon number one singles and artist
(weeks at number one)

- "Kita no Yadokara" – Harumi Miyako (3 weeks in 1976 + 2 weeks in 1977)
- "Seishun Jidai" – Koichi Morita & Top Gallants (4)
- "S.O.S." – Pink Lady (1)
- "Shitsuren Restaurant" – Kentaro Shimizu (5)
- "Carmen '77" – Pink Lady (5)
- "Kaeranai / Koibitoyo" – Kentaro Shimizu (2)
- "Yumesaki Annainin" – Momoe Yamaguchi (1)
- "Amayadori" – Masashi Sada (4)
- "Katte ni Shiyagare" – Kenji Sawada (5)
- "Nagisa no Sindbad" – Pink Lady (8)
- "Wanted (Shimei Tehai)" – Pink Lady (12)
- "Wakareuta" – Miyuki Nakajima (1)
- "UFO" – Pink Lady (2 weeks in 1977 + 8 weeks in 1978)

== Top 40 Chart hit singles ==
Song title	Artist(s)	Release date(s)	US	UK	Highest chart position	Other Chart performance(s)
"Brick House"	Commodores	August 1977	5	n/a	5 (United States)	61 (New Zealand)
"Closer to the Heart"	Rush	October 1977	76	36	36 (United Kingdom)	45 (Canada)
"Come Sail Away"	Styx	September 1977	8	n/a	8 (United States)	9 (Canada)
"Dancing in the Moonlight (It's Caught Me in Its Spotlight)"	Thin Lizzy	August 1977	n/a	14	14 (United Kingdom)	4 (Ireland) - 85 (Canada)
"Daybreak"	Barry Manilow	September 1977	23	n/a	23 (United States)	7 (Canada)
"Do Anything You Wanna Do"	Eddie and the Hot Rods	July 1977	n/a	9	9 (United Kingdom)	11 (Ireland)
"Don't Believe a Word"	Thin Lizzy	January 1977	n/a	12	12 (United Kingdom)	2 (Ireland)
"Egyptian Reggae"	Jonathan Richman and the Modern Lovers	September 1977	n/a	5	2 (Netherlands)	3 (Germany)
"(Every Time I Turn Around) Back in Love Again"	L.T.D.	October 1977	4	n/a	4 (United States)	1 (U.S. R&B)
"Fanfare for the Common Man"	Emerson, Lake & Palmer	May 1977	n/a	2	2 (United Kingdom)	3 (Ireland)
"Feel the Need"	The Detroit Emeralds	March 1977	n/a	12	12 (United Kingdom)	10 (Ireland)
"Fly At Night"	Chilliwack	February 1977	75	n/a	12 (Canada)	n/a
"Foreplay/Long Time"	Boston	March 1977	22	n/a	17 (Canada)	n/a
"Heard It in a Love Song"	The Marshall Tucker Band	March 1977	14	n/a	14 (United States)	25 (Canada)
"Hey Deanie"	Shaun Cassidy	November 1977	7	n/a	6 (Canada)	1 (U.S. Adult Contemporary)
"I Go Crazy"	Paul Davis	August 1977	7	n/a	4 (Canada)	57 (Australia)
"I Like Dreamin'"	Kenny Nolan	October 1976	3	n/a	3 (United States)	12 (Canada)
"I Want You to Want Me"	Cheap Trick	September 1977	7	n/a	1 (Japan)	2 (Canada)
"Life in the Fast Lane"	Eagles	May 1977	11	n/a	11 (United States)	12 (Canada) - 96 (Australia)
"My Heart Belongs to Me"	Barbra Streisand	May 1977	4	n/a	3 (Canada)	1 (U.S. Billboard Adult Contemporary) - 5 (U.S. Cash Box Top 100) - 1 (Canada RPM Adult Contemporary)
"No More Heroes"	The Stranglers	September 1977	n/a	8	8 (United Kingdom)	19 (Netherlands)
"On the Border"	Al Stewart	March 1977	42	n/a	39 (Canada)	n/a
"Peaches/Go Buddy Go"	The Stranglers	May 1977	n/a	8	8 (United Kingdom)	19 (Netherlands)
"Right Time of the Night"	Jennifer Warnes	January 1977	6	n/a	3 (Canada)	n/a
"Rockaria!"	Electric Light Orchestra	February 1977	n/a	9	9 (United Kingdom)	10 (Australia) - 19 (Ireland)
"Runaway"	Bonnie Raitt	April 1977	41	n/a	37 (Canada)	n/a
"She Did It"	Eric Carmen	August 1977	23	n/a	11 (Canada)	n/a
"Something Better Change/Straighten Out"	The Stranglers	July 1977	n/a	8	8 (United Kingdom)	19 (Netherlands)
"Surfin' USA"	Leif Garrett	September 1977	20	n/a	2 (Australia)	8 (Canada)
"Swayin' to the Music (Slow Dancing)"	Johnny Rivers	June 1977	10	n/a	10 (United States)	11 (Canada)
"Swingtown"	Steve Miller Band	October 1977	17	n/a	13 (Canada)	n/a
"That's Rock and Roll"	Shaun Cassidy	July 1977	3	n/a	1 (Canada)	26 (Australia)
"This Is Tomorrow"	Bryan Ferry	January 1977	n/a	9	6 (Australia)	14 (Netherlands) - 14 (Sweden)
"Tie Your Mother Down"	Queen	March 1977	49	31	10 (Netherlands [Single Top 100])	14 (Netherlands [Dutch Top 40]) - 18 (Belgium [Flanders]) - 42 (Belgium [Wallonia]) - 68 (Canada)
"Tryin' to Love Two"	William Bell	November 1976	10	n/a	10 (United States)	1 (U.S. R&B)
"Watching the Detectives"	Elvis Costello	October 1977	n/a	15	15 (United Kingdom)	35 (Canada)
"What's Your Name"	Lynyrd Skynyrd	November 1977	13	n/a	6 (Canada)	n/a
"Wonderous Stories"	Yes	September 1977	n/a	7	7 (United Kingdom)	6 (Ireland)
"You and Me"	Alice Cooper	April 1977	9	n/a	3 (Canada)	31 (Australia)
"Your Love"	Marilyn McCoo and Billy Davis Jr.	March 1977	15	n/a	15 (United States)	9 (U.S. R&B)

=== Other Chart hit singles ===
- "Alison" – Elvis Costello
- "American Girl" – Tom Petty and the Heartbreakers
- "The Chain" – Fleetwood Mac
- "Gary Gilmore's Eyes" – The Adverts
- "In the City" – The Jam
- "Let Your Body Go Downtown" – Martyn Ford Orchestra
- "Like a Hurricane" – Neil Young
- "Lookin' After No. 1" – The Boomtown Rats
- "Love Is the Answer" – Utopia
- "Magazine Madonna" – Sherbet
- "Marquee Moon" – Television
- "Modern Love" – Peter Gabriel
- "Motorhead" – Motörhead
- "Psycho Killer" – Talking Heads
- "Road Runner" – Jonathan Richman and the Modern Lovers
- "Sex & Drugs & Rock & Roll" – Ian Dury
- "Tulane" – Steve Gibbons Band
- "White Punks on Dope" – The Tubes
- "White Riot" – The Clash
- "Your Song" – Billy Paul

== Notable singles ==
Song title	Artist(s)	Release date(s)	Other Chart performance(s)
"1 2 X U" b/w "Field Goal"	Wire	November 1977	—
"Arrombou a festa" b/w "Corista de rock"	Rita Lee & Tutti Frutti	March 1977	—
"The Beatles Play the Residents and the Residents Play the Beatles"	The Residents	August 1977	—
"Blank Generation"	Richard Hell and the Voidoids	September 1977	—
"Ca Plane Pour Moi"	Plastic Bertrand	December 1977	8 (UK Singles Chart), 2 (Australia)
"Complete Control"	The Clash	September 1977	28 (UK Singles Chart)
"Cough/Cool" b/w "She"	Misfits	August 1977	—
"Die Nachtwache" b/w "The Lead and How to Swing It"	Cluster & Brian Eno	June 1977	—
"Don't Start Me Talking"	The Yachts	October 1977	— (First incarnation as The Chuddy Nuddies)
"From Here to Eternity"	Giorgio Moroder	August 1977	16 (UK Singles Chart)
"Gary Gilmore's Eyes" b/w "Bored Teenagers"	The Adverts	September 1977	18 (UK Singles Chart)
"God Save the Queen"	Sex Pistols	May 1977	2 (UK Singles Chart)
"Heroes"	David Bowie	September 1977	24 (UK Singles Chart), 11 (Australia)
"I Feel Love"	Donna Summer	May 1977	1 (UK Singles Chart), 6 (US Billboard Hot 100)
"I Want More"	Can	March 1977	26 (UK Singles Chart)
"I'm Alive"	999	August 1977	—
"In the City"	The Jam	April 1977	40 (UK Singles Chart)
"In the Flesh"	Blondie	October 1977	2 (Australia Kent Music Report)
"King Kong"	The Tubes	May 1977	—
"Less Than Zero"	Elvis Costello	March 1977	—
"Looking After No. 1"	The Boomtown Rats	August 1977	—
"London Lady" b/w "Grip"	The Stranglers	January 1977	44 (UK Singles Chart)
"Lust for Life"	Iggy Pop	September 1977	3 (UK Singles Chart, re-entry)
"Magic Fly"	Space	April 1977	2 (UK Singles Chart), 1 (France)
"Marquee Moon"	Television	April 1977	30 (UK Singles Chart)
"Megaton" b/w "Desert Patrol"	Suburban Reptiles	December 1977	—
"Memphis"	John Cale	September 1977	— (From 'Animal Justice' EP)
"Mongoloid" b/w "Jocko Homo"	Devo	March 1977	62 (UK Singles Chart)
"Motörhead"	Motörhead	June 1977	—
"My Generation"	The Vibrators	October 1977	—
"No More Heroes"	The Stranglers	September 1977	8 (UK Singles Chart)
"No Passion Tense"	Radio Birdman	April 1977	—
"Oh Bondage Up Yours!"	X-Ray Spex	September 1977	—
"Orgasm Addict"	Buzzcocks	October 1977	—
"Oxygène (Part IV)"	Jean-Michel Jarre	January 1977	4 (UK Singles Chart), 3 (France)
"Oxygène (Part II)"	Jean-Michel Jarre	July 1977	—
"Panik"	Métal Urbain	May 1977	—
"Psycho Killer"	Talking Heads	December 1977	92 (US Billboard Hot 100)
"Red Squares"	The Diodes	October 1977	—
"Rip Her to Shreds"	Blondie	November 1977	81 (UK Singles Chart)
"Roadrunner"	Jonathan Richman & The Modern Lovers	July 1977	11 (UK Singles Chart)
"Roxanne"	The Police	April 1977	12 (UK Singles Chart, re-issue)
"Science Friction"	XTC	October 1977	—
"Screamin' Fist"	The Viletones	July 1977	—
"Sex & Drugs & Rock & Roll"	Ian Dury	August 1977	—
"Sheena Is a Punk Rocker"	Ramones	May 1977	81 (US Billboard Hot 100), 22 (UK)
"Showroom Dummies"	Kraftwerk	May 1977	—
"Solsbury Hill"	Peter Gabriel	March 1977	13 (UK Singles Chart), 68 (US)
"Sonic Reducer"	Dead Boys	September 1977	—
"Sneakin' Suspicion"	Dr. Feelgood	May 1977	47 (UK Singles Chart)
"The Modern Dance"	Pere Ubu	September 1977	—
"This Perfect Day"	The Saints	July 1977	34 (UK Singles Chart)
"Tomorrow Night"	Shoes	September 1977	—
"Trans-Europe Express"	Kraftwerk	April 1977	67 (US Billboard Hot 100), 10 (Germany)
"Two Steps Back"	Penetration	November 1977	—
"Young Savage"	Ultravox	May 1977	—
"Whole Wide World"	Wreckless Eric	August 1977	—
"Your Generation"	Generation X	September 1977	36 (UK Singles Chart)
"2-4-6-8 Motorway"	Tom Robinson Band	October 1977	5 (UK Singles Chart)
"5 O'Clock in the Morning" b/w "Mechanical Convoy"	Godley & Creme	November 1977	—

=== Other notable singles ===
- "Frozen Ones" b/w "Man Who Dies Every Day" - Ultravox

== Published popular music ==
- "After the Lovin'" w. Richie Adams m. Alan Bernstein
- "Annie" w. Martin Charnin m. Charles Strouse from the musical Annie
- "Brazzle Dazzle Day" w.m. Al Kasha & Joel Hirschhorn, from the film Pete's Dragon
- "But the World Goes 'Round" w. Fred Ebb m. John Kander. Introduced by Liza Minnelli in the film New York City
- "Child In A Universe" w.m. Laura Nyro
- "Come In From The Rain" w.m. Melissa Manchester & Carole Bayer Sager
- "Easy Street" w. Martin Charnin m. Charles Strouse from the musical Annie
- "The Greatest Love of All" w. Linda Creed m. Michael Masser
- "Happy Endings" w. Fred Ebb m. John Kander. Introduced by Liza Minnelli, Larry Kert and chorus in the film New York, New York
- "Here You Come Again" w.m. Barry Mann & Cynthia Weil
- "I Don't Need Anything But You" w. Martin Charnin m. Charles Strouse from the musical Annie
- "I Think I'm Gonna Like It Here" w. Martin Charnin m. Charles Strouse from the musical Annie
- "It's Not Easy" w.m. Al Kasha & Joel Hirschhorn, from the film Pete's Dragon
- "It's the Hard-Knock Life" w. Martin Charnin m. Charles Strouse from the musical Annie
- "Just the Way You Are" w.m. Billy Joel
- "Little Girls" w. Martin Charnin m. Charles Strouse from the musical Annie
- "The Love Boat theme song" w.m. Norman Gimbel & Paul Williams
- "Love Is in the Air" w.m. George Young & Harry Vanda
- "Maybe" w. Martin Charnin m. Charles Strouse from the musical Annie
- "Maybe I'm Amazed" w.m. Paul McCartney
- "Movin' Out (Anthony's Song)" w.m. Billy Joel
- "N.Y.C." w. Martin Charnin m. Charles Strouse from the musical Annie
- "A New Deal For Christmas" w. Martin Charnin m. Charles Strouse from the musical Annie
- "New York, New York" w.m. Fred Ebb & John Kander. Introduced by Liza Minnelli in the film New York City
- "Nobody Does It Better" w. Carole Bayer Sager m. Marvin Hamlisch
- "She's Always a Woman" w.m. Billy Joel
- "Someone's Waiting for You" w. Carol Connors & Ayn Robbins m. Sammy Fain from the film The Rescuers
- "Something Was Missing" w. Martin Charnin m. Charles Strouse from the musical Annie
- "Star Wars-Main Theme" m. John Williams from the Star Wars films
- "Stayin' Alive" w.m. Barry Gibb, Maurice Gibb & Robin Gibb
- "Thank You for the Music" w.m. Benny Andersson & Björn Ulvaeus
- "There Goes the Ball Game" w. Fred Ebb m. John Kander. Introduced by Liza Minnelli in the film New York, New York
- "Tomorrow" w. Martin Charnin m. Charles Strouse, from the musical Annie
- "We'd Like to Thank You, Herbert Hoover" w. Martin Charnin m. Charles Strouse from the musical Annie
- "You Won't Be an Orphan for Long" w. Martin Charnin m. Charles Strouse from the musical Annie
- "You're Never Fully Dressed Without a Smile" w. Martin Charnin m. Charles Strouse, from the musical Annie

== Punk rock, new wave music, and mod revival ==
1977 marks the beginning of the punk rock movement. Several albums associated with the development of punk music were released, including Never Mind the Bollocks, Here's the Sex Pistols by the Sex Pistols, The Clash by The Clash, Damned Damned Damned by The Damned, the Dead Boys' Young, Loud and Snotty, Johnny Thunders and the Heartbreakers' L.A.M.F., the Ramones' Rocket to Russia, Richard Hell and the Voidoids' Blank Generation, and Wire's Pink Flag.

The year saw the release of debut albums by bands associated with punk rock, though also with other new music genres, such as the mod revival and new wave music, including In the City by The Jam, My Aim Is True by Elvis Costello, Suicide by Suicide, Marquee Moon by Television, and Talking Heads: 77 by Talking Heads. It also saw the release of Iggy Pop's Lust for Life, his second record as a solo artist.

== Classical music ==
- John Adams – China Gates, for piano
- Samuel Adler
  - Aeolus, God of the Winds, for clarinet, violin, cello, and piano
  - Concerto for Flute and Orchestra
  - A Falling of Saints, for tenor, bass, chorus, and orchestra
  - It is to God I shall Sing, for chorus and organ
- Kalevi Aho – Quintet, for bassoon and string quartet
- Necil Kazım Akses
  - Concerto for Orchestra
  - Concerto for Viola and Orchestra
- Franghiz Ali-Zadeh – Zu den Kindertotenlieder (In Memoriam Gustav Mahler), for clarinet, violin, and percussion
- Birgitte Alsted – Strygekvartet i CD, for string quartet
- Javier Álvarez – Canciones de la Venta, for soprano, violin, viola, and baroque guitar
- William Alwyn
  - Invocations (song cycle), for mezzo-soprano and piano
  - A Leave-Taking (song cycle), for tenor and piano
- Charles Amirkhanian – Dutiful Ducks, for tape with optional live voices
- Gilbert Amy
  - Strophe, for soprano and orchestra (revised version)
  - Trois études, for flute
- Beth Anderson – Joan, for tape
- Laurie Anderson
  - Audio Talk, performance art
  - On Dit, performance art
  - Some Songs, performance art
  - Stereo Decoy, performance art
  - That's Not the Way I Heard It, performance art
- Ruth Anderson – Sound Portraits I–II, text pieces
- Hendrik Andriessen – Ricercare, version for wind orchestra
- Jurriaan Andriessen
  - Psalmen-trilogie, for baritone, chorus, and orchestra
  - Symphony no. 7, The Awakening Dream, for keyboard and electronics
  - Symphony no. 8, La celebrazione
- Louis Andriessen – Hoketus, for two groups of 6 players each
- Denis ApIvor
  - Chant Eolien, for oboe and piano, op. 65
  - Concerto for Cello and Orchestra, op. 64
- Violet Archer – Plainsongs, for mezzo-soprano and piano
- Malcolm Arnold
  - Sonata, for flute and piano, op. 121
  - Variations on a Theme of Ruth Gipps, for orchestra, op. 122
- Larry Austin – Quadrants: Event/Complex no. 11, for double bass and tape
- Luciano Berio
  - Coro, for 40 voices and 40 instruments (revised version)
  - Fantasia, for orchestra (after Giovanni Gabrieli)
  - Il ritorno degli snovidenia, for cello and 30 instruments
  - Sequenza VIII, for violin
  - Toccata, for orchestra (after Girolamo Frescobaldi)
- Harrison Birtwistle – Silbury Air
- Rob du Bois
  - Skarabee, for orchestra
  - Zodiak, for one or more instruments or instrumental groups
- John Buller – Proença for mezzo-soprano, electric guitar, and large orchestra
- Enrique Crespo – American Suite No. 1
- George Crumb – Star-Child (1977, revised 1979) for soprano, antiphonal children's voices, male speaking choir, bell ringers, and large orchestra
- Peter Maxwell Davies
  - A Mirror of Whitening Light, for chamber orchestra
  - Our Father Which in Heaven Art, for flute, clarinet, piano, percussion, violin, cello
  - Runes from a Holy Island, for flute, clarinet, piano, percussion, violin, cello
  - Westerlings, for SATB choir
- Franco Donatoni
  - Algo, for guitar
  - Ali, for viola
  - Diario ’76, for four trumpets and four trombones
  - Portrait, for harpsichord and orchestra
  - Spiri, for flute, oboe, clarinet, bass clarinet, celesta, vibraphone, 2 violins, viola, and cello
  - Toy, for 2 violins, viola, and harpsichord
- Morton Feldman
  - Instruments 3, for flute, oboe, and percussion
  - Spring of Chosroes, for violin and piano
- Brian Ferneyhough – Time and Motion Study I, for bass clarinet
- Lorenzo Ferrero
  - Arioso
  - Romanza seconda
- Frans Geysen –
  - Muziek voor toetsenbord, for piano
  - Omtrent sib, for three oboes
  - Orgelstuk, for organ
  - Pentakel, for oboe
  - Stadssteeg, for 6 oboes, 4 trumpets, 2 trombones
- Alberto Ginastera
  - Barabbas, opera (unfinished)
  - Concerto No. 1 for Cello and Orchestra, op. 36 (revised version)
  - Glosses sobre temes de Pau Casals, for orchestra, op. 48
- Alexander Goehr – Romanza on the Notes of Psalm IV, op. 38c
- Sembiin Gonchigsumlaa – Symphony No. 2
- Pelle Gudmundsen-Holmgreen
  - Passacaglia for tabla, clarinet, violin, cello and piano
  - Symfoni, Antifoni for orchestra
- Rodolfo Halffter – Secuencia, op. 39, for piano
- Bengt Hambraeus – Antiphonie: Cathedral Music for Organ
- Alan Hovhaness
  - Ananda, piano sonata, op. 303
  - Celestial Canticle, for coloratura soprano and piano, op. 305
  - Dawn on a Mountain Lake, for double bass and piano, op. 393
  - Fred the Cat, piano sonata, op. 301
  - Glory Sings the Setting Sun, cantata for coloratura soprano, clarinet, and piano, op. 292
  - How I Love Thy Law, cantata for high soprano, clarinet, piano, op. 298
  - Mount Belknap, piano sonata, op. 299, no. 1 (revised version)
  - Mount Ossipee, piano sonata, op. 299, no. 2 (revised version)
  - Mount Shasta, piano sonata, op. 299, no. 3 (revised version)
  - A Presentiment, for coloratura soprano and piano, op. 304
  - Suite, for flute and guitar, op. 300 (1977)
  - Sonata, for oboe and bassoon, op. 302
  - Sonata, for 2 clarinets, op. 297
  - Sonata No. 1, for harpsichord, Op. 306
  - Sonatina ("Meditation on Mt. Monadnock"), for piano, op. 288
  - The Spirit's Map, for voice and piano, op. 391
  - Srpouhi, duet for violin and piano, op. 398
  - Symphony No. 31, for strings, op. 294
  - Symphony No. 32 ("The Broken Wings"), op. 296
  - Symphony No. 33 ("Francis Bacon"), op. 307
  - Symphony No. 34, for bass trombone and strings, op. 310
- Maki Ishii
  - Black Intention, for recorder
  - Voices—Violet, for gidayū ensemble, shō, and percussion
- David C. Johnson – Ars Subtilior Electrica, electronic music
- Mauricio Kagel
  - An Tasten, étude for piano
  - MM51, film score
  - Présentation für zwei
  - Quatre degrés (Schlagzeugtrio für Holzinstrumente)
  - Variété (Concert-Spectacle für Artisten und Musiker)
- Jonathan Kramer
  - Renascence, for clarinet and tape (revised version)
  - Studies on Six Notes, for harpsichord
- György Kurtág
  - Hommage à Mihály András (Twelve Microludes for String Quartet), op. 13
  - [untitled pieces], op. 15, for guitar (unpublished, withdrawn)
- Helmut Lachenmann – Salut für Caudwell, music for two guitarists
- André Laporte
  - Icarus' Flight, for piano and twelve instruments
- Mario Lavista
  - Pieza para caja de música, for music box
  - Los inocentes, incidental music
- Luca Lombardi
  - Tui-Gesänge, for soprano, flute, clarinet, piano, violin, and cello
  - Variazioni su ‘Avanti popolo alla riscossa’, for piano
  - Variazioni, for orchestra
- John McGuire – Pulse Music II, for four pianos and small orchestra
- Tomás Marco
  - Herbania, for harpsichord
  - Hoquetus, for 1, 2, or 3 clarinets, live and/or recorded
  - Sicigia, for cello
  - Sonata de Vesperia, for piano
  - Tormer, for harpsichord, violin, viola, and cello
- Bo Nilsson – Madonna, for mezzo-soprano and instrumental ensemble
- Pehr Henrik Nordgren
  - Violin Concerto No. 2, Op. 33v
  - Summer Music for orchestra, Op. 34
  - Akinosuke-no-yume (安芸之助の夢; The Dream of Akinosuke) for piano, Op. 35
  - Jyūroku-zakura (十六ざくら) for piano, Op. 36
  - Jikininki (食人鬼) for piano, Op. 37
  - Häjyt (The Evil Braggarts), orchestral music for the television play, Op. 38
  - Butterflies for guitar solo, Op. 39
  - Tuolla mun heilani asuskeloo (Yonder Lives My Sweet Love) for string orchestra, Op. 40
- Per Nørgård
  - Kredsløb, for SATB choir
  - Mating Dance, for flute (+ alto flute) and guitar
  - Twilight, for orchestra
- Einojuhani Rautavaara
  - Suomalainen myytti (A Finnish Myth), for string orchestra
  - Serenades of the Unicorn, for guitar
- Arvo Pärt
  - Cantus in Memoriam Benjamin Britten
  - Fratres
  - Tabula Rasa
  - Variationen zur Gesundung von Arinuschka, for piano
- Henri Pousseur
  - Ballade berlinoise, for piano
  - Liège à Paris, electronic music
- Einojuhani Rautavaara
  - Suomalainen myytti (A Finnish Myth), for string orchestra
  - Serenades of the Unicorn, for guitar
- Aulis Sallinen
  - Simppeli Simme ja Hamppari, for mixed choir
  - Symphony No. 1
- Dieter Schnebel
  - Canon (‘Diapason’)
  - Handwerke-Blaswerke I (Arianna), for 1 wind instrument, 1 string instrument, and 1 percussionist
  - Orchestra, for orchestra
  - Quintet in B♭ major, for piano and strings
  - Rhythmen, for 2 guitars, organ, and percussion
- Kurt Schwertsik
  - Concerto for Violin No. 1, op. 31
  - Wiener Chronik 1848, ballet op. 28
- Gerald Shapiro
  - Dance Suite, for piano
  - For Nancy, wordless vocalise, for soprano and piano
  - Questions, for SATB choir
  - You are Your Own Energy Source, electroacoustic dance score
- Makoto Shinohara – Liberation, for orchestra
- Roger Smalley – Seven Modulator Pieces, for 4 flutes
- Karlheinz Stockhausen
  - Atmen gibt das Leben, for choir and orchestra, Nr. 39
  - In Freundschaft, Nr. 46
  - Jahreslauf, Nr. 47
  - Jubiläum, for orchestra, Nr. 45
  - Sirius, electronic music with trumpet, soprano, bass clarinet, and bass voice, Nr. 43
  - Tierkreis, for chamber orchestra, Nr. 41^{7}/_{8}
- Tōru Takemitsu
  - A Flock Descends into the Pentagonal Garden
  - Gitā no tame no jūni no uta, for guitar
  - Hanare goze Orin, film score
  - Ohan, incidental music for television
  - Quatrain II, for clarinet, violin, cello, and piano
  - Sabita honoo, film score
  - Saigō Takamori den, incidental music for television
  - Toono monogatari wo yuku: Yanagida Kunio no fūkei, incidental music for television
  - Water-ways for clarinet, violin, cello, piano, two harps, and two vibraphones
- Michael Tippett – Symphony No. 4
- Alexander Vustin – In Memory of Boris Klyuzner
- Iannis Xenakis – Jonchaies
- Isang Yun – Concerto for Flute and Small Orchestra

== Opera ==
- William Alwyn – Miss Julie, opera in 2 acts, after Strindberg
- Dominick Argento – Miss Haversham's Fire
- Luciano Berio – Opera (revised version, 28 May, Teatro Comunale Florence)
- Peter Maxwell Davies – The Martyrdom of St Magnus (June 18, Kirkwall, St Magnus Cathedral)
- Julian Livingston – Twist of Treason
- Thea Musgrave – Mary, Queen of Scots
- Donald Sosin – Esther
- Karlheinz Stockhausen – Atmen gibt das Leben (May 22, 1977, Nice)
- Michael Tippett – The Ice Break (July 7, Royal Opera House, Covent Garden)
- Morton Feldman – Neither (1977, Rome Opera)

== Musical theatre ==
- The Act – Broadway production opened at the Majestic Theatre and ran for 233 performances
- Annie (Martin Charnin and Charles Strouse) – Broadway production opened at the Alvin Theatre on April 21, 1977, and ran for 2377 performances
- I Love My Wife – Broadway production opened at the Ethel Barrymore Theatre on April 17 and ran for 857 performances
- I Love My Wife – London production opened at the Prince of Wales Theatre on October 6 and ran for 401 performances
- The King and I (Rodgers and Hammerstein) – Broadway revival
- Privates on Parade – London production opened at the Aldwych Theatre on February 17 and ran for 208 performances
- Side by Side by Sondheim – Broadway production opened at the Music Box Theatre and ran for 384 performances
- Oliver! (Lionel Bart) – London revival

== Musical films ==
- ABBA: The Movie
- A Little Night Music
- Amar Akbar Anthony
- The Hobbit (animation)
- New York, New York
- Pete's Dragon
- Saturday Night Fever

== Births ==
- January 1
  - Donna Ares, Bosnian singer (d. 2017)
  - Axel, Argentine singer-songwriter
  - Jerry Yan, Taiwanese singer
- January 3 – Michelle Stephenson, British singer and TV presenter (Spice Girls)
- January 4 – Tim Wheeler, Irish rock singer (Ash)
- January 4 – Irán Castillo, Mexican actress and singer
- January 5 – Roy Arad, Israeli singer (PingPong)
- January 11 – Nadia Turner, American singer
- January 18
  - Richard Archer, British singer (Hard-Fi)
  - Michael Tierney, Australian singer (Human Nature)
- January 20
  - Melody, Belgian singer
  - Sid Wilson, American musician
- January 23 – Kamal Heer, Punjabi singer and musician
- January 25 – Christian Ingebrigtsen, Norwegian singer (A1)
- January 26 – Nicholaus Arson, Swedish guitarist and songwriter
- January 28 – Joey Fatone, American singer (*NSYNC)
- February 2
  - Shakira, Colombian singer-songwriter, dancer, businesswoman and record producer
  - Jessica Wahls, German pop singer
- February 3 – Maitland Ward, American actress and model
- February 4 – Gavin DeGraw, American musician and singer-songwriter
- February 8 – Dave Farrell, American musician (Linkin Park)
- February 10 – Rosanna Tavarez, American singer, Television presenter, dancer and teacher (Eden's Crush)
- February 11 – Mike Shinoda, American musician, songwriter, record producer and graphic designer
- February 15 – Brooks Wackerman, American drummer (Bad Religion, Avenged Sevenfold)
- February 18 – Sean Watkins, American guitarist and songwriter
- February 20 – Amal Hijazi, Lebanese singer and model
- February 21 – Cyrine Abdelnour, Lebanese singer, actress and model
- February 28 – Jason Aldean, American country singer-songwriter
- March 2 – Chris Martin, English rock singer and pianist (Coldplay)
- March 3 – Ronan Keating, Irish singer (Boyzone)
- March 4 – Jason Marsalis, American jazz drummer, vibraphonist and composer
- March 6 – Bubba Sparxxx, American rapper
- March 7 – Paul Cattermole, British singer (S Club 7) (died 2023)
- March 8 – Thành Thảo, Vietnamese singer and actress
- March 10
  - Robin Thicke, American-Canadian R&B singer-songwriter and actor
  - Bree Turner, American dancer and actress
  - Colin Murray, British radio disc jockey
  - Matt Rubano, American rock bassist (Taking Back Sunday)
- March 11 – Jason Greeley, Canadian singer
- March 15 – Joseph Hahn, American musician, DJ, director and visual artist (Linkin Park)
- March 16 – Ben Kenney, American rock bassist (Incubus)
- March 17 – Tamar Braxton, American singer-songwriter and actress (The Braxtons)
- March 18 – Devin Lima, American musician (LFO) (d. 2018)
- March 19 – Jorma Taccone, American actor, comedian, director, writer, producer, record producer and musician (The Lonely Island)
- March 22 – John Otto, American drummer (Limp Bizkit)
- March 24 – Natalie Hemby, American country music songwriter and singer
- April 9 – Gerard Way, American vocalist, visual artist and songwriter (My Chemical Romance)
- April 17 – Frederik Magle, Danish composer, concert organist and pianist
- April 19 – Bryan Spears, American film and television producer, sister of Britney Spears
- April 22
  - Anna Eriksson, Finnish pop-rock singer
  - Steven Price, British film composer
- April 23 – John Cena, American professional wrestler, actor and singer
- April 23 – Arash, Iranian-Swedish singer, entertainer and producer
- April 23 – Tony Sunshine, American R&B singer (Terror Squad)
- April 25
  - Matthew West, American guitarist and singer
  - Constantinos Christoforou, Greek-Cypriot singer (One)
- April 26 – Célena Cherry, British group (Honeyz)
- April 28 – Joanne Yeoh, Malaysian violinist
- April 30 – Ole Jørn Myklebust, Norwegian jazz musician
- May 7 – Lisa Kelly, Irish singer
- May 8 – Joe Bonamassa, American musician
- May 11 – Nathalie Pâque, Belgian singer
- May 12 – Wu Fei, Chinese musician and composer
- May 13 – Pusha T, American rapper and record executive
- May 16 – Emilíana Torrini, Icelandic singer-songwriter
- May 17 – Aleksandra Gryka, Polish classical composer
- May 19 – Natalia Oreiro, Uruguayan actress and singer
- May 20 – Matt Czuchry, American actor
- May 22 – Nina Inhammar, Swedish singer (Friends)
- May 24 – Jeet Gannguli, Indian singer, music director and score composer
- May 28
  - Leo the Lion, English singer-songwriter and actor (The Streets)
  - Brian Friedman, American dancer and choreographer
- May 31
  - Scott Klopfenstein, American musician and vocalist (Reel Big Fish)
  - Joel Ross, British disc jockey
  - Chris Pennie, American musician (Coheed and Cambria)
- June 5 – Nourhanne, Lebanese singer
- June 8 – Kanye West, American rapper, singer-songwriter, record producer, fashion designer and entrepreneur
- June 10
  - Adam Darski, Polish musician
  - Takako Matsu, Japanese singer-songwriter and actress
- June 12
  - Kenny Wayne Shepherd, guitarist
  - Ana Tijoux, French-Chilean musician
- June 23 – Jason Mraz, American singer-songwriter and musician
- June 24 – Francine Jordi, Swiss pop singer
- June 25 – Tim Anderson, American songwriter and producer
- June 27 – Dan Andriano, American bassist (Alkaline Trio)
- June 28
  - Mark Stoermer, American rock guitarist (The Killers)
  - Harun Tekin, Turkish rock vocalist and guitarist (Mor ve Ötesi)
- June 29 – DEALZ, American rapper
- June 29 – Sam Bailey, English singer
- July 1
  - Tom Frager, French-born singer and surfer
  - Liv Tyler, American actress daughter of Steven Tyler
- July 5 – Royce da 5'9", American rapper
- July 8 – Barbara Tausia, Belgian choreographer and dancer (Eu4ya)
- July 10 – Jesse Lacey, American singer-songwriter and guitarist (Brand New and Taking Back Sunday)
- July 12 – Airin Older, American musician
- July 14 – Gordon Cree, composer
- July 15 – Ray Toro, American musician and vocalist (My Chemical Romance)
- July 18 – Tony Fagenson, American musician, producer and songwriter (Eve 6, Dead Posey)
- July 20 – Şebnem Paker, Turkish guitarist singer and music teacher
- July 28 – Jacoby Shaddix, American singer-songwriter, rapper and TV presenter (Papa Roach)
- July 29
  - Danger Mouse, American record producer (Gnarls Barkley)
  - Rodney Jerkins, American record producer, songwriter and rapper
- July 30
  - Ian Watkins, Welsh singer (Lostprophets)
  - Paw Lagermann, Danish singer-songwriter and record producer (Infernal)
- August 7
  - Samantha Ronson, English DJ and singer-songwriter (Lindsay Lohan, Mark Ronson)
  - Nicco, American recording artist
- August 8 – Marsha Ambrosius, English singer-songwriter
- August 10 – Aaron Kamin, American guitarist and vocalist (The Calling)
- August 12 – Park Yong-ha, South Korean actor and singer (d. 2010)
- August 16 – Tamer Hosny, Egyptian singer and actor
- August 17
  - Claire Richards, British singer and dancer (Steps)
  - Tarja Turunen, Finnish operatic soprano singer-songwriter
- August 19 – Katrina Woolverton, American singer-songwriter
- August 30 – Jens Ludwig, German guitarist
- August 31
  - Craig Nicholls, Australian singer-songwriter and guitarist (The Vines)
  - Del Marquis, American musician (Scissor Sisters)
- September 1
  - Chris Cain, American rock bassist (We Are Scientists)
  - Kathleen de Leon Jones, Australian actress, singer and dancer
- September 2
  - Elitsa Todorova, Bulgarian singer-songwriter
  - Sam Rivers, American bassist (Limp Bizkit) (d. 2025)
- September 3 – DJ Envy, American disc jockey, record producer and radio personality
- September 4
  - Ian Grushka, American musician and songwriter (New Found Glory)
  - Lucie Silvas, English singer
- September 6
  - Kiyoshi Hikawa, Japanese enka singer
  - N.O.R.E., American rapper (Capone-N-Noreaga)
- September 9 – Chae Jung-an, South Korean actress and singer
- September 11
  - Jonny Buckland, English-born Welsh rock guitarist (Coldplay)
  - Ludacris, American rapper and actor
  - Jang Minho, South Korean singer (U-BeS)
- September 12
  - 2 Chainz, American rapper and businessman
  - James McCartney, English musician and singer, son of Paul McCartney and Linda McCartney
- September 13 – Fiona Apple, American singer-songwriter
- September 15 – Angela Aki, Japanese singer-songwriter
- September 19 – Ioana Maria Lupascu, Romanian pianist
- September 20
  - Namie Amuro, Japanese singer
  - The-Dream, American singer-songwriter and record producer (Christina Milian, Rihanna, Beyoncé)
- September 23
  - Susan Tamim, Lebanese singer and actress (d. 2008)
  - Piero Esteriore, Swiss singer
- September 29 – Trine Jepsen, Danish singer, actress and Television presenter (EyeQ)
- October 1 – Owen Biddle, rock bass guitarist (The Roots)
- October 4 – Ana Johnsson, Swedish singer
- October 5 – Wendy Vera, Ecuadorian musician and composer
- October 6 – Melinda Doolittle, American singer
- October 12 – Young Jeezy, American rapper
- October 13 – Justin Peroff, Canadian drummer and percussionist (Broken Social Scene)
- October 15 – Erin McKeown, American folk-rock singer-songwriter
- October 16 – John Mayer, American singer-songwriter and guitarist
- October 17 – Nicole Cabell, American operatic soprano
- October 22 - The Blessed Madonna, American DJ, musician and producer
- October 25 – Yehonathan Gatro, Israeli singer and actor
- November 1 – Alistair Griffin, British singer-songwriter
- November 4 – Kavana, British singer
- November 7 – Wigor, Polish rapper and producer
- November 8
  - Khia, American rapper, songwriter and record producer
  - Bucky Covington, American singer
  - Tiffani Wood, Australian singer-songwriter (Bardot)
- November 10 – Brittany Murphy, American actress and singer (d. 2009)
- November 13 – Huang Xiaoming, Chinese actor and singer
- November 14 – Obie Trice, African-American rapper
- November 15 – Logan Whitehurst, American one man band (died 2006)
- November 18 – Fabolous, American rapper
- November 20 – Daniel Svensson, Swedish drummer
- November 21 – Annie, Norwegian singer-songwriter and DJ
- November 23 – Christopher Amott, Swedish guitarist
- November 27 – Ivar Bjørnson, Norwegian songwriter and guitarist (Enslaved)
- November 28 - Katrina Parker, American independent artist, contestant on The Voice
- November 30 – Steve Aoki, American musician, record producer, DJ and music executive
- December 1
  - Brad Delson, American guitarist (Linkin Park)
  - Akiva Schaffer, American actor, filmmaker, comedian and musician (The Lonely Island)
  - Bryan-Michael Cox, American record producer and songwriter (Usher, Mariah Carey, Mary J. Blige and Toni Braxton)
- December 7 – Dominic Howard, English alternative rock drummer (Muse)
- December 9 – Imogen Heap, English singer-songwriter, record producer and audio engineer
- December 12 – Andy Williams, American metalcore rhythm guitarist (Every Time I Die) and wrestler (died 2026)
- December 18 – Axwell, Swedish DJ, record producer and remixer
- December 21
  - Toby Rand, Australian singer-songwriter (Juke Kartel)
  - Regína Ósk, Icelandic singer (Eurobandið)
- December 23 – Nitty, American rapper
- December 24 – Gil Seong-joon, South Korean hip hop duo (Leessang)
- December 25 – Mariama Goodman, British R&B singer-songwriter (Honeyz)
- December 31 – Psy, South Korean singer-songwriter

== Deaths ==
- January 1 – Michael Mann, violinist, son of Thomas Mann, 57 (suicide)
- January 2 – Erroll Garner, jazz pianist, 53 (heart attack)
- January 16 – Tom Archia, jazz saxophonist, 57
- January 23 – Dick Burnett, folk songwriter, 94
- January 29 – Johnny Franz, English record producer, 54
- February 8 – Eivind Groven, microtonal composer and music theorist, 75
- February 10 – Grace Williams, composer, 70
- February 12 – Ernst Mehlich, German-Brazilian conductor and composer, 89
- February 23 – Margaret Daum, operatic soprano, 70
- February 26 – Bukka White, blues guitarist and singer, 67
- February 28 – Eddie "Rochester" Anderson, comic actor and singer, 71
- March 10 – E. Power Biggs, organist, 70
- April 14 – Johnny Broderick, pianist, composer, songwriter, and vaudeville performer in the act Arren and Broderick
- May 6 – Joseph Hislop, operatic and concert tenor, 93
- May 9 – Harold Spivacke, music librarian and administrator, 72
- May 22 – Hampton Hawes, jazz pianist, 48 (brain haemorrhage)
- May 26 – William Powell (The O'Jays), 35 (cancer)
- May 30 – Paul Desmond, jazz saxophonist, 52 (lung cancer)
- June 5 – Sleepy John Estes, blues guitarist and singer, 78
- June 13 – Matthew Garber, former child star of Mary Poppins, 21 (pancreatitis)
- June 22 – Peter Laughner, American singer-songwriter and guitarist (Rocket From the Tombs and Pere Ubu), 24
- June 30 – Ernst Oster, pianist, musicologist, and music theorist, 69 (stroke)
- July 2 – Gert Potgieter, South African operatic tenor and actor, 47 (car accident)
- July 6 – Ödön Pártos, Hungarian-born Israeli violist and composer, 69
- July 20 – Gary Kellgren, American record producer, co-founded Record Plant, 38 (drowned)
- July 26 – Gena Branscombe, Canadian composer and conductor, 95
- August 16 – Elvis Presley, singer, 42 (heart attack)
- August 19 – Groucho Marx, comedian, actor, singer and performer, 86 (pneumonia)
- September 1 – Ethel Waters, American blues, jazz and gospel singer, 80
- September 5 – George Barnes, swing jazz guitarist, 56
- September 13 – Leopold Stokowski, conductor, 95
- September 16
  - Marc Bolan, singer-songwriter, 29 (car crash)
  - Maria Callas, operatic soprano, 53 (heart attack)
- September 29 – Alexander Tcherepnin, composer, 78
- September 30 – Mary Ford, guitarist and vocalist, 53 (diabetes-related)
- October 8 – Giorgos Papasideris, Greek singer, composer, and lyricist, 75
- October 13 – Shirley Brickley, the Orlons, 32 (shot)
- October 14 – Bing Crosby, American singer and actor, 74
- October 18 – Kristian Hauger, Norwegian pianist, orchestra leader and composer of popular music (born 1905)
- October 19 – Marino Capicchioni, Italian musical instrument maker, 82
- October 20 – Ronnie Van Zant, 29, Steve Gaines, 28, and Cassie Gaines, 29, American members of Lynyrd Skynyrd (plane crash)
- November 5 – Guy Lombardo, violinist and bandleader, 75
- November 14 – Richard Addinsell, Warsaw Concerto composer, 73
- December 5 – Rahsaan Roland Kirk, jazz saxophonist, flutist, composer, 42 (stroke)
- December 24 – Salvatore Papaccio, Canzone Napoletana tenor, 87
- December 25 – Charlie Chaplin, actor and composer, 88
- December 28 – Sam Brown, jazz guitarist, 38
- December 30 – St. Louis Jimmy Oden, blues singer, 74
- date unknown – Jimmy Cooper, hammered dulcimer player, 70

== Awards ==
- Grammy Awards of 1977
- Country Music Association Awards
- Eurovision Song Contest 1977
- 19th Japan Record Awards
