= Wigor =

Wigor may refer to:

- Wigor (rapper) (born 1978), full name Michał Igor Dobrzański, Polish rapper and producer
- Wigor (footballer) (born 1995), full name Wigor Alan do Nascimento, Brazilian footballer
