= Parcel of Rogues =

The phrase Parcel of Rogues is taken from the Robert Burns poem Such a Parcel of Rogues in a Nation. It may refer to:

- "Such a Parcel of Rogues in a Nation", a folk song based on the Burns poem
- Parcel of Rogues (album), by Steeleye Span, which includes this song
- A Parcel of Rogues (album), by The Dubliners, which includes this song
- 1635: A Parcel of Rogues, a novel by Eric Flint and Andrew Dennis
