= Now (The Dubliners album) =

Studio album by The Dubliners
- Released: 1975
- Genre: Irish folk
- Label: Polydor
- Producer: Earl Gill

The Dubliners chronology
Live (1974)	Now (1975)	A Parcel of Rogues (1976)

Now is a studio album by The Dubliners released in 1975. Following the departure of both Ciarán Bourke and Ronnie Drew in 1974, singer/guitarist Jim McCann joined Barney McKenna, Luke Kelly and John Sheahan as a member of The Dubliners to record this album, which Sheahan himself produced. The slight shift in personnel produced a more mellow sound. Arguably, McCann's greatest contribution to the album is the ballad "Carrickfergus", which became one of his most popular and requested songs. It also features a rendition of the English ballad, "The Unquiet Grave", performed by Luke Kelly.

== Track listing ==
Side One:

1. "Farewell to Carlingford"
2. "The Old Triangle"
3. "The Beggarman"
4. "Matt Hyland"
5. "The Downfall of Paris"
6. "Carrickfergus"

Side Two:

1. "Lord of the Dance"
2. "The Lifeboat Mona"
3. "Farewell to Ireland"
4. "The Unquiet Grave"
5. "Lord Inchiquin"
6. "The Lark in the Morning"
