= 15 Years On =

Studio album by The Dubliners
- Released: 1977
- Genre: Irish folk
- Label: Chyme Records
- Producer: Earl Gill

The Dubliners chronology
Live at Montreux (1977)	15 Years On (1977)	Together Again (1979)

15 Years On is the eleventh studio album by the Irish folk band The Dubliners. This album was created to celebrate the band's 15th anniversary from the day they started music together. The album was released on the Chyme label in 1977. The album features 24 tracks on two records (with nine of which were previously unreleased): A: side-one: Track two: Ploughboy Lads, track four: Bunclody. A: side-two: track three: Reels: Last Night's Fun & The Congress Reel, track four: The Banks of the Sweet Primroses. B: side-one: track two: Salamanca, track three: Spancil Hill. B: side-two: track two: O'Carolan's Devotion, track four: Down by the Glenside, track six: Molly Malone.

In spite of having only nine previously unreleased tracks, it is still regarded as an original album.

== Special Track Features ==
The group's line-up consisted of Barney McKenna, Luke Kelly, John Sheahan and Jim McCann. Ronnie Drew feature on a number of the previously available tracks. Ciarán Bourke is not to hear on this double album.

== Track listing ==
=== Disc One ===
Side one:

1. "The Wild Rover"
2. "Ploughboy Lads"
3. "The Three Sea Captains"
4. "Bunclody"
5. "Seven Drunken Nights"
6. "The Belfast Hornpipe/Tim Maloney"

Side two:

1. "Black Velvet Band"
2. "Carrickfergus"
3. "Reels: Last Night's Fun & The Congress Reel"
4. "The Banks of the Sweet Primroses"
5. "Weile Waile"
6. "Four Green Fields"

=== Disc Two ===
Side one:

1. "The Town I Loved So Well"
2. "Salamanca"
3. "Spancil Hill"
4. "McAlpine's Fusiliers"
5. "Boulavogue"
6. "The Auld Triangle"

Side two:

1. "Spanish Lady"
2. "O'Carolan's Devotion"
3. "Thirty Foot Trailer"
4. "Down by the Glenside"
5. "Fiddlers Green"
6. "Molly Malone"

== Mislabelled Instrumental Tracks ==
The tune labelled "Salamanca" is a medley of "The Snow on the Hills" (O'Neill 569) and "The Salamanca Reel" (O'Neill 603), from O'Neill's Dance Music of Ireland.

== Tour ==
The 15 Years On Tour was a tour of Europe and Australia throughout 1977 in support of the album.
