= A Parcel of Rogues (album) =

Studio album by The Dubliners
- Released: 1976
- Studio: Dublin Sound Studios
- Genre: Irish folk
- Label: Polydor
- Producer: Earl Gill

The Dubliners chronology
| Now (1975) | A Parcel of Rogues (1976) | Live at Montreux (1977) |

Professional ratings
Review scores
| Source | Rating |
|---|---|
| Allmusic | 4.5/5 stars |

A Parcel of Rogues is an album by The Dubliners, released through the Polydor label in 1976. It featured Barney McKenna, Luke Kelly, John Sheahan and Jim McCann. It was re-released on CD by ARC Music in 1988.

== Track listing ==
=== Side One ===
- All songs trad. (arranged by The Dubliners for Squirrel Music), except where noted.
1. "Spanish Lady"
2. "The Foggy Dew"
3. "Kid on the Mountain"
4. "Avondale"
5. "The Acrobat/Village Bells"
6. "The Blantyre Explosion"

=== Side Two ===
1. "False Hearted Lover"
2. "Thirty Foot Trailer" (Ewan McColl; Harmony Music)
3. "Boulavogue"
4. "Doherty's Reel/Down the Broom/Honeymoon Reel"
5. "Parcel of Rogues" (Robert Burns)
6. "Killieburn Brae"
