= 1977 in American music =

The following is a list of events and releases that happened in 1977 in music in the United States.

== Notable events ==
- January 26 – Patti Smith falls off the stage onto a concrete surface while opening for Bob Seger in Tampa, Florida, injuring some vertebrae, and is rushed to the hospital for 22 stitches to close head lacerations.
- August 18 – While Elvis Presley's funeral is taking place at Graceland, a car crashes into a group of fans, killing two.
- October 20 – Lynyrd Skynyrd plane crash: Three band members are killed.

== Musical groups formed ==
- Dallas Symphony Chorus
- Odyssey

== Musical groups disbanded ==
- Bread

== Billboard top popular records of 1977 ==
Billboard's year-end Hot 100 for the year 1977, printed on December 24, 1977, was based on Hot 100 charts from the issue dates of November 6, 1976 through October 29, 1977. The decision to include the last two months of 1976 resulted in Rod Stewart's "Tonight's the Night" being listed as no. 1 record of 1977, despite seven of its eight weeks at #1 occurring in 1976 (keep reading).

The completed Billboard year-end list for 1977 is composed of records that entered the Billboard Hot 100 between November 1976 and December 1977. Records with chart runs that started in 1976 and ended in 1977, or started in 1977 and ended in 1978, made this chart if the majority of their chart weeks were in 1977. If not, they were ranked in the year-end charts for 1976 or 1978. If their weeks were equal, they were listed in the year they first entered. Appearing in multiple years is not permitted. Each week thirty points were awarded to the number one record, then nineteen points for number two, eighteen points for number three, and so on. The total points a record earned determined its year-end rank. The complete chart life of each record is represented, with number of points accrued. There are no ties, even when multiple records have the same number of points. The next ranking category is peak chart position, then weeks at peak chart position, weeks on Hot 100 chart, weeks in top forty, and finally weeks in top ten.

The chart presented here depicts the top 30 singles of 1977. In contrast with the Billboard Year-End Hot 100 singles of 1977, this chart does not truncate or split chart runs between years. It does not add two months from 1976, delete two months from 1977 and then call itself the "Year-End Hot 100 singles of 1977", which it is obviously not. The true number one record of 1977 is Debby Boone's "You Light Up My Life", which spent the last 18 weeks of the year accumulating 362 points. The seven additional weeks it scored from 1978 were not even needed for the top prize. Rod Stewart's "Tonight's the Night" scored only 73 points in 10 weeks during 1977, so based on its 223 points from 13 weeks in 1976, its 296 total points made it the number one record of that year, not 1977. All chart rankings represented below for the Top Soul Singles, Top Country Singles, Top Easy Listening Singles, and Top CashBox pop singles were all calculated in the same manner.

The chart can be sorted by Artist, Song title, Recording and Release dates, Cashbox year-end ranking (CB) or units sold (sales) by clicking on the column header. Additional details for each record can be accessed by clicking on the song title, and referring to the Infobox in the right column of the song page. Billboard also has chart summaries on its website. Sales information was derived from the RIAA's Gold and Platinum database, the BRIT Certified database and The Book of Golden Discs, but numbers listed should be regarded as estimates. Grammy Hall of Fame and National Recording Registry information with sources can be found on Wikipedia. Archived issues of Billboard from November 1976 to March 1978 and Hot 100 Year-End formulas were used to complete the 1977 year-end chart.

Rank	Artist	Title	Label	Recorded	Release date	CB	Sales	Charts, Awards
1	Debby Boone	"You Light Up My Life"	Warner Bros. 8455	July 1977	August 16, 1977	1	4.00	US Billboard 1977 #1, Hot 100 # #1 for 10 weeks, 25 total weeks, 387 points, Grammy Hall of Fame 1998, National Recording Registry 2012
2	The Bee Gees	"How Deep Is Your Love"	RSO 882	April 1977	September 1977	2	2.00	US Billboard 1977 #2, Hot 100 #1 for 2 weeks, 33 total weeks, 323 points, Top Easy Listening Singles 1977 #1, Easy Listening Singles #1 for 6 weeks, 26 total weeks, 371 points, Grammy Hall of Fame 2011
3	Andy Gibb	"I Just Want To Be Your Everything"	RSO 872	October 1976	April 1977	3	3.00	US Billboard 1977 #3, Hot 100 #1 for 4 weeks, 31 total weeks, 321 points, Grammy Hall of Fame 2000
4	The Emotions	"Best Of My Love"	Columbia 10544	May 1977	June 9, 1977	15	5.00	US Billboard 1977 #4, Hot 100 #1 for 5 weeks, 23 total weeks, 105 points, Top Soul Singles 1977 #3, Hot Soul Singles #1 for 4 weeks, 22 total weeks, 282 points
5	Barbra Streisand	"Love Theme From A Star Is Born (Evergreen)"	Columbia 10450	1976	December 1976	9	3.00	US Billboard 1977 #5, Hot 100 #1 for 3 weeks, 25 total weeks, 256 points, Top Easy Listening Singles 1977 #2, Easy Listening Singles #1 for 6 weeks, 22 total weeks, 363 points, Grammy Hall of Fame 2004
6	Player	"Baby Come Back"	RSO 879	1977	October 13, 1977	5	1.50	US Billboard 1977 #6, Hot 100 #1 for 3 weeks, 32 total weeks, 219 points, Grammy Hall of Fame 2017
7	Eagles	"Hotel California"	Asylum 45386	March–October 1976	February 22, 1977	23	1.50	US Billboard 1977 #7, Hot 100 #1 for 1 weeks, 19 total weeks, 186 points
8	Stevie Wonder	"Sir Duke"	Tamla 54281	1976	March 22, 1977	33	3.00	US Billboard 1977 #8, Hot 100 #1 for 3 weeks, 17 total weeks, 180 points
9	ABBA	"Dancing Queen"	Atlantic 3372	August 4–5, 1975	August 15, 1976	17	1.50	US Billboard 1977 #9, Hot 100 #1 for 1 week, 22 total weeks, 178 points
10	Crystal Gayle	"Don't It Make My Brown Eyes Blue"	United Artists 1016	1976	August 1977	6	3.00	US Billboard 1977 #10, Hot 100 #2 for 3 weeks, 26 total weeks, Grammy Hall of Fame 1999, 77 points, Top Country Singles 1977 #3, Country Singles #1 for 4 weeks, 18 total weeks, 177 points
11	Mary MacGregor	"Torn Between Two Lovers"	Ariola America 7638	May 1976	Nov 1, 1976	4	1.00	US Billboard 1977 #11, Hot 100 #1 for 2 weeks, 22 total weeks, 175 points
12	Carly Simon	"Nobody Does It Better"	Elektra 45413	April 1977	July 1977	8	3.25	US Billboard 1977 #12, Hot 100 #2 for 3 weeks, 25 total weeks, 168 points, Top Easy Listening Singles 1977 #3, Easy Listening Singles #1 for 7 weeks, 25 total weeks, 322 points
13	Marvin Gaye	"Got To Give It Up (Part 1)"	Tamla 54280	March 18, 1977	July 16, 1977	25	2.25	US Billboard 1977 #13, Hot 100 #1 for 1 week, 18 total weeks, 167 points, Top Soul Singles 1977 #4, Hot Soul Singles #1 for 5 weeks, 21 total weeks, 288 points
14	Stevie Wonder	"I Wish"	Tamla 54274	Summer 1976	November 1976	20	3.00	US Billboard 1977 #14, Hot 100 #1 for 1 week, 17 total weeks, 166 points, Top Soul Singles 1977 #7, Hot Soul Singles #1 for 5 weeks, 18 total weeks, 274 points
15	Eagles	"New Kid In Town"	Asylum 45373	March–October 1976	December 7, 1976	31	1.50	US Billboard 1977 #15, Hot 100 #1 for 1 week, 15 total weeks, 165 points
16	Thelma Houston	"Don't Leave Me This Way"	Tamla 54278	March 1976	December 2, 1976	32	1.25	US Billboard 1977 #16, Hot 100 #1 for 1 week, 24 total weeks, 164 points
17	Fleetwood Mac	"Dreams"	Warner Bros. 8332	February–August 1976	March 1977	29	1.25	US Billboard 1977 #17, Hot 100 #1 for 1 week, 19 total weeks, 163 points
18	Linda Ronstadt	"Blue Bayou"	Asylum 45431	June–July 1977	August 23, 1977	27	2.00	US Billboard 1977 #18, Hot 100 #3 for 3 weeks, 23 total weeks, 162 points, Grammy Hall of Fame 1998
19	Glen Campbell	"Southern Nights"	Capitol 4376	October 2, 1976	January 17, 1977	14	1.50	US Billboard 1977 #19, Hot 100 #1 for 1 week, 21 total weeks, 160 points
20	Alan O'Day	"Undercover Angel"	Pacific 001	January 27, 1977	February 6, 1977	7	2.00	US Billboard 1977 #20, Hot 100 #1 for 1 week, 23 total weeks, 158 points
21	Heatwave	"Boogie Nights"	Epic 50370	1976	May 11, 1977	16	1.50	US Billboard 1977 #21, Hot 100 #2 for 2 weeks, 27 total weeks, 158 points
22	Barry Manilow	"Looks Like We Made It"	Arista 0244	1976	April 20, 1977	39	2.00	US Billboard 1977 #22, Hot 100 #1 for 1 week, 19 total weeks, 154 points, Top Easy Listening Singles 1977 #7, Easy Listening Singles #1 for 3 weeks, 20 total weeks, 291 points
23	Steve Miller Band	"Fly Like An Eagle"	Capitol 4372	1976	August 13, 1976	42	1.50	US Billboard 1977 #23, Hot 100 #2 for 2 weeks, 20 total weeks, 154 points, Grammy Hall of Fame 1998
24	Rita Coolidge	"(Your Love Keeps Lifting Me) Higher and Higher"	A&M 1922	1968	January 1977	11	2.00	US Billboard 1977 #24, Hot 100 #2 for 1 week, 27 total weeks, 154 points
25	Bill Conti	"Gonna Fly Now (Theme From Rocky)"	United Artists 940	June 13, 1977	August 21, 1977	36	2.00	US Billboard 1977 #25, Hot 100 #1 for 1 week, 20 total weeks, 152 points, Grammy Hall of Fame 1998
26	Peter Frampton	"I'm In You"	A&M 1941	April 1977	June 3, 1977	35	1.25	US Billboard 1977 #26, Hot 100 #2 for 3 weeks, 20 total weeks, 150 points
27	Daryl Hall & John Oates	"Rich Girl"	RCA 10860	June 1976	January 1977	12	1.25	US Billboard 1977 #27, Hot 100 #1 for 2 weeks, 20 total weeks, 148 points, Grammy Hall of Fame 2017
28	Leo Sayer	"When I Need You"	Warner Bros. 8332	Nov 4, 1976	February 6, 1977	13	6.00	US Billboard 1977 #28, Hot 100 #1 for 1 week, 20 total weeks, 146 points
29	K.C. and the Sunshine Band	"I'm Your Boogie Man"	TK 1022	January 26, 1977	May 11, 1977	18	1.50	US Billboard 1977 #29, Hot 100 #1 for 1 week, 23 total weeks, 145 points
30	Manfred Mann's Earth Band	"Blinded By The Light"	Warner Bros. 8252	Nov 4, 1976	August 16, 1977	38	6.00	US Billboard 1977 #30, Hot 100 #1 for 1 week, 20 total weeks, 143 points
31	Dolly Parton	"Here You Come Again"	RCA 11123	June 1977	September 26, 1977	43	1.00	US Billboard 1977 #31, Hot 100 #3 for 2 weeks, 19 total weeks, 141 points, Top Country Singles 1977 #2, Country Singles #1 for 5 weeks, 19 total weeks, 237 points
32	Fleetwood Mac	"Don't Stop"	Warner Bros. 8413	February–August 1976	April 1, 1977	24	1.25	US Billboard 1977 #32, Hot 100 #3 for 2 weeks, 18 total weeks, 139 points
65	The Floaters	"Float On"	ABC 12284	1977	June 1977	37	1.00	US Billboard 1977 #65, Hot 100 #2 for 2 weeks, 16 total weeks, 92 points, Top Soul Singles 1977 #1, Hot Soul Singles #1 for 6 weeks, 20 total weeks, 305 points
158	Waylon Jennings	"Luckenbach, Texas (Back to the Basics of Love)"	RCA 10924	January 1977	April 11, 1977	161	1.00	US Billboard 1977 #158, Hot 100 #25 for 2 weeks, 16 total weeks, 92 points, Top Country Singles 1977 #1, Country Singles #1 for 6 weeks, 18 total weeks, 247 points

== Classical music ==
- John Adams – China Gates
- George Crumb – Star-Child

== Births ==
- January 12 – DJ Paul, DJ, record producer, and rapper for Three 6 Mafia
- September 13 – Fiona Apple, singer-songwriter
- December 1 – Brad Delson, guitarist (Linkin Park)

== Deaths ==
- January 2 – Erroll Garner, jazz pianist (b. 1921)
- February 28 – Eddie "Rochester" Anderson, comedian and singer (b. 1905)
- May 30 – Paul Desmond, jazz saxophonist and composer (b. 1924)
- August 16 – Elvis Presley, actor, musician and singer-songwriter (b. 1935)
- September 1 – Ethel Waters, singer and actress (b. 1896)
- September 13 – Leopold Stokowski, British-born American conductor (b. 1882)
- September 30 – Mary Ford, guitarist and vocalist (b. 1924)
- October 5 – Jan Garber, jazz bandleader (b. 1894)
- October 14 – Bing Crosby, pop singer and actor (b. 1903)
- October 20 – Three members of rock group, Lynyrd Skynyrd, killed in plane crash:
  - Ronnie Van Zant, lead singer (b. 1948)
  - Cassie Gaines, lead singer (b. 1948)
  - Steve Gaines, lead singer and guitarist (b. 1949)
- November 5 – Guy Lombardo, bandleader (b. 1902)
- December 5 – Rahsaan Roland Kirk, American jazz multi-instrumentalist (b. 1935)
- December 30 – St. Louis Jimmy Oden, blues singer, 74
