= Lady of Spain (disambiguation) =

"Lady of Spain" is a popular standard song written in 1931, popularized in 1952 by Eddie Fisher.

Lady of Spain or Spanish Ladies may also refer to:

- Lady of Spain, an album by organist Ethel Smith
- "Spanish Lady", a traditional Irish folk song
- "Spanish Ladies", a traditional English naval song (sea shanty)
- The Spanish Lady, unfinished opera by Edward Elgar
- female members of the Spanish nobility
- female of the Spanish people

== See also ==
- "Lady of Elche", an Iberian sculpture from the 4th century BC
