= 1977 in Nordic music =

The following is a list of notable events and releases that happened in Scandinavian music in 1977.

== Events ==
- 7 May – The 22nd Eurovision Song Contest is held in London, after being postponed from 2 April because of a BBC technicians' strike. Finland is the best-performing of the Scandinavian countries, finishing 10th. Norway finishes 14th and Sweden 18th. Denmark does not participate.
- December – Swedish punk band Ebba Grön is founded in Stockholm.

== New works ==
- Kalevi Aho – Quintet, for bassoon and string quartet
- Birgitte Alsted – Strygekvartet i CD, for string quartet
- Bengt Hambraeus – Antiphonie: Cathedral Music for Organ
- Pehr Henrik Nordgren
  - Violin Concerto No. 2, Op. 33
  - Summer Music for orchestra, Op. 34
  - Akinosuke-no-yume (安芸之助の夢; The Dream of Akinosuke) for piano, Op. 35
  - Jyūroku-zakura (十六ざくら) for piano, Op. 36
  - Jikininki (食人鬼) for piano, Op. 37
  - Häjyt (The Evil Braggarts), orchestral music for the television play, Op. 38
  - Butterflies for guitar solo, Op. 39
  - Tuolla mun heilani asuskeloo (Yonder Lives My Sweet Love) for string orchestra, Op. 40
- Per Nørgård
  - Kredsløb, for SATB choir
  - Mating Dance, for flute (+ alto flute) and guitar
  - Twilight, for orchestra
- Einojuhani Rautavaara
  - Suomalainen myytti (A Finnish Myth), for string orchestra
  - Serenades of the Unicorn, for guitar
- Aulis Sallinen – Simppeli Simme ja Hamppari, for mixed choir

== Hit singles ==
- ABBA – "Knowing Me, Knowing You" (#1 Belgium, Ireland, South Africa, UK)
- Monica Aspelund – "Lapponia" (#20 Sweden)
- Jan Lindblad – "Oh Shenandoah" (#1 Sweden)
- Shu-bi-dua – "Mig og så Harry"
- Anita Skorgan – "Casanova" (#4 Norway)

== Hit albums ==
- ABBA – ABBA: The Album

== Eurovision Song Contest ==
- Finland in the Eurovision Song Contest 1977
- Norway in the Eurovision Song Contest 1977
- Sweden in the Eurovision Song Contest 1977

== Film and television music ==
- Björn Isfält & Lasse Dahlberg – Bröderna Lejonhjärta
- Ralph Lundsten – Elvis! Elvis!
- Gunner Møller Pedersen – En Forårsdag i Helvede

== Musical films ==
- ABBA: The Movie

== Deaths ==
- 8 February – Eivind Groven, Norwegian composer and music-theorist (born 1901)
- 5 March – Moses Pergament, Finnish-born classical composer
- 18 October – Kristian Hauger, Norwegian pianist, orchestra leader and composer of popular music (born 1905)
- 24 October – Hugo Myrtelius, Swedish conductor and composer (born 1892 in Nordic music)
- unknown date – John Gunnarsson Helland, Norwegian Hardanger fiddle maker (born 1897)

== See also ==
- 1977 in Denmark
- 1977 in Iceland
- 1977 in Norwegian music
- 1977 in Sweden
