= Jubiläum =

Orchestral composition by Karlheinz Stockhausen

- Orchestral music by Karlheinz Stockhausen
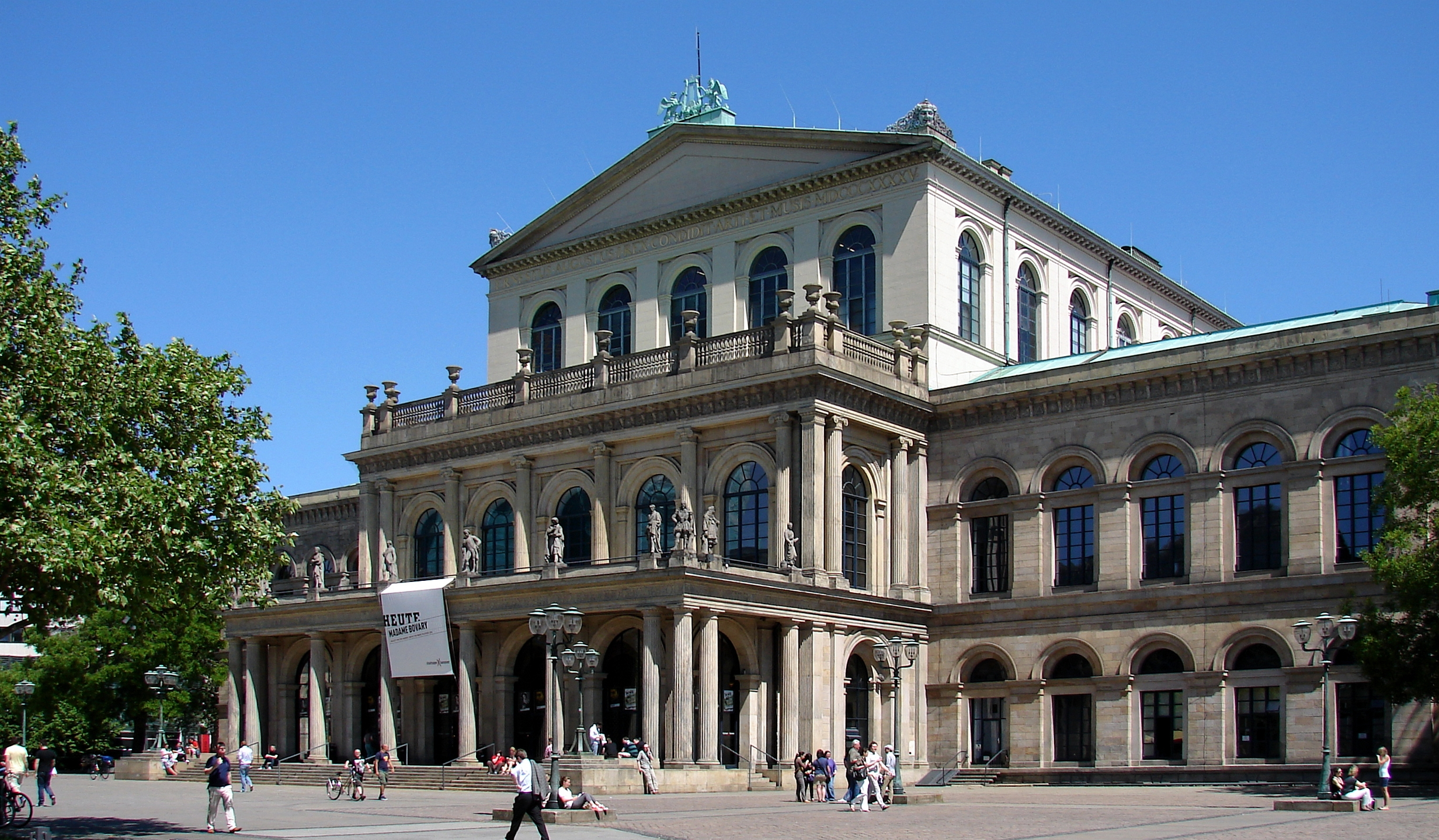
- Hannover Opera House
- Catalogue: 45
- Occasion: 125 jubilee of the opera house
- Composed: 1977
- Dedication: Péter Eötvös
- Performed: 10 October 1977
- Duration: 15 min.

Jubiläum (Jubilee) is an orchestral composition by Karlheinz Stockhausen, work-number 45 in the composer's catalogue of works.

== History ==
Jubiläum is a relatively short work of about 15 minutes duration, written in 1977 on commission for the 125th-anniversary celebration of the Hannover Opera House, and has therefore been called Stockhausen's Operatic Festival Overture. It was premiered on 10 October 1977 by the Regional Orchestra of Lower Saxony, conducted by George Albrecht. In February 1980 Stockhausen revised the score, and this version was first performed on 9 May 1980 at the Royal Festival Hall, London, by the Philharmonia Orchestra conducted by Andrew Davis. The score is dedicated to Péter Eötvös.

== Character of the work ==
In Jubiläum, Stockhausen composed an orchestral sound event with superimposed layers of different speeds, degrees of noise, degrees of indeterminacy and integration, and simultaneous transitions from ordered to disordered and back. The work is built upon a formula, announced at the beginning as a massive hymn-like chant in the brass and low strings. The harmonic language of Jubiläum is reminiscent of the music of Stockhausen's teacher Olivier Messiaen, and the dramatic use of space recalls Hector Berlioz. The formula is presented mainly in a series of dense textures overlaid with shimmering glissandos and rapid melodic figurations, in a "mix of majestic confidence and restless activity" that produces a quality of "breathtaking splendour that is Stockhausen's alone".

The formula of Jubiläum is in the guise of a chorale with a melody containing 15 pitches grouped into five segments of 1 + 2 + 3 + 4 + 5 tones:

(C) + (F F♯) + (G♯ D♯ A) + (C♯ B A♯ E) + (G E B♭ D G).

The five segments have durations of 2, 3 (1 + 2), 6 (3 + 1 + 2), 10 (2 + 4 +1 + 3), and 15 (4 + 1 + 2 + 3 + 5) crotchets, and each is followed by a "coloured silence" of 2, 3, 4, 6, and 9 crotchets. These colourations are made in the lower instruments (horns, violas, cellos) by overtone glissandos, in the middle register by natural-harmonic glissandos in the violins, and in the highest register by arpeggios on five triangles and a set of glass chimes.

Each note of this melody is accompanied by a chord, and these chords fluctuate in density between two and five notes according to a serial distribution: 2 3 4 5 5 4 3 2 3 4 5 5 4 3 2 notes per chord. These chords collectively form a harmonic double "wave", whose chord densities rise and fall twice. At the same time, a single wave of level of dissonance first increases from a unison at the beginning to a minor ninth in the middle, and then decreases back to perfect consonances (octave and perfect fifth) at the end.

== Form ==
There are four superimposed instrumental layers corresponding to different musical processes. Each layer is effectively a melodic "loop" of fifteen notes, constantly repeating but transformed in pitch and speed.

The orchestra is arranged on the platform according to register, with the deepest instruments at the left, progressing across the stage to the highest instruments on the right—analogous to a piano keyboard A tenor layer (trumpets, horns, violas, and cellos) begins with a slow statement of the formula, and then the players begin repeating the formula independent of one another, gradually increasing speed until the fifteen notes of the formula compress into a "whirling band of sound".

A mezzo-soprano group (flutes, clarinets, and violins) plays the formula a perfect eleventh higher. This layer begins with the instruments playing independently and very fast, gradually slowing down and becoming synchronised at the middle, then accelerating and becoming independent again at the end. A very high group, recalling the "star-sound" colouring of Stockhausen's Formel, consisting of glockenspiels, piano (treble only, with sustaining pedal), and celesta, plays the formula two octaves and a major seventh higher than the bass group, and begins like the middle-register group, playing fast and independent of one another. They also slow down and begin to differentiate the rhythmic values of the formula, but do this more gradually than the middle-register group, achieving the slowest tempo only near the end, concluding with a synchronised statement of the formula in its slowest tempo, lasting about two minutes. These three layers unfold a combined shape in which the slow chorale is presented on successively higher steps.

The fourth, lowest instrumental group (bell plates, bassoons, and double basses) plays the formula seven times as a ground bass, synchronised each time to one of the other three groups:

1. with the bass group, very slow
2. with the bass group, accelerando
3. with the middle group, ritardando
4. with the middle group, very slow
5. with the middle group, accelerando
6. with the high group, ritardando
7. with the high group, very slow

The low brass break through the musical fabric with a statement of the formula from the back of the hall (or from a projecting balcony at the back or at one side) a little more than three minutes from the beginning, and the four oboes similarly play from offstage about nine-and-a-half minutes through the piece. The composer calls these events "sound windows". All four instrumental groups conclude the work with a synchronous formula statement, nearly four times the speed of the slowest tempo, to end in a "festive, brilliant, and confident" mode.

These elements combine to produce a symmetrical form of nine sections plus the concluding (tenth) statement:

1. tenor chorale, ca. 2 mins.
2. accel./rit., ca. 1½ mins.
3. first window (trombones and tuba, back of the hall), ca. 1 min.
4. rit./accel., ca. 1½ mins.
5. mezzo-soprano chorale, ca. 2 mins.
6. accel./rit., ca. 1½ mins.
7. second window (offstage oboes), ca. 1 min.
8. rit./accel., ca. 1½ mins.
9. high chorale, ca. 2 minutes
10. tutti coda, ca. 37 secs.

In the revised version of 1980, one after another six solo instruments step forth from the orchestra, starting in the second stage with the first horn. In the fourth stage (just after the first window), a cumulation begins, first with a duet, then a trio, quartet, quintet, and finally a sextet, linking the polyphonic layers through all the registers and horizontalising their harmonies into concise melodic and rhythmic figures.

- in the second stage, the first horn
- from the fourth stage, adding the first trombone
- from the fifth stage, adding the first violin
- from the sixth stage, adding the first flute
- from the eighth stage (just after the second window), adding the first oboe
- from the ninth stage, adding the piano

Like the rest of the orchestra, these instruments are distinctly separated in space. Whereas the first version of the score relied solely on acoustical means to achieve dynamic balance, amplification became a requirement for performance after the addition of the soloists in the revised version.

== Instrumentation ==
- 4 (or 2) flutes (4th doubling piccolo)
- 4 (or 2) oboes
- 4 (or 2) clarinets
- 3 (or 2) bassoons
- 1 contrabassoon
- 4 (or 2) horns (B♭/F double horns)
- 3 (or 2) trumpets (all with straight, cup, and wawa mutes)
- 4 (or 2) trombones (or 3 trombones and 1 additional horn—1st trombone with F attachment)
- 1 tuba
- 2 glockenspiels (with pedal)
- 1 set of hanging glass chimes
- 5 triangles of different sizes
- 2 Percussionists:
- 1 chromatic set of sound plates (or plate bells, or a chromatic set of tuned gongs and tamtams)
- 1 piano
- 1 celesta
- first violins
- second violins
- violas
- cellos
- double basses
- (+ 10 microphones, 6 loudspeakers, and a mixing desk for a sound director)

Strings are doubled either as 8–8–8–6–6 or 10–10–8–6–6.

== Discography ==
- Stockhausen, Karlheinz. Jubiläum für Orchester; Tierkreis: Zehn Sternzeichen für Orchester; Tierkreis für das historische Glockenspiel des Kölner Rathauses. BBC Symphony Orchestra, cond. Oliver Knussen (Jubiläum). Orchestra Mozart (Bologna), cond. Oliver Knussen (Tierkreis for orchestra); Cologne Town Hall Carillon, programmed by Bert Augustus (adaptation of a version of Tierkreis by Kathinka Pasveer and Suzanne Stephens). Stockhausen Complete Edition CD 100. Kürten: Stockhausen-Verlag, 2010.
