= Dallas Symphony Chorus =

- Also known as: DSC, DSO Chorus
- Origin: Dallas, Texas, United States
- Genre: Classical
- Years active: 1977-present
- Website: www.dschorus.com

The Dallas Symphony Chorus (DSC) is the official vocal ensemble of the Dallas Symphony Orchestra.

The all-volunteer chorus has supported classical and pops performances with the Dallas Symphony Orchestra, as well as appearances in the greater Dallas metroplex, across the United States, and with orchestras in venues around the world. The chorus regularly rehearses and performs at the Morton H. Meyerson Symphony Center from August–May during the symphony season.

The chorus has performed in Israel (1996) and South America (2003) and made its fourth European tour in 2018 with performances in Sweden, Finland and Estonia.

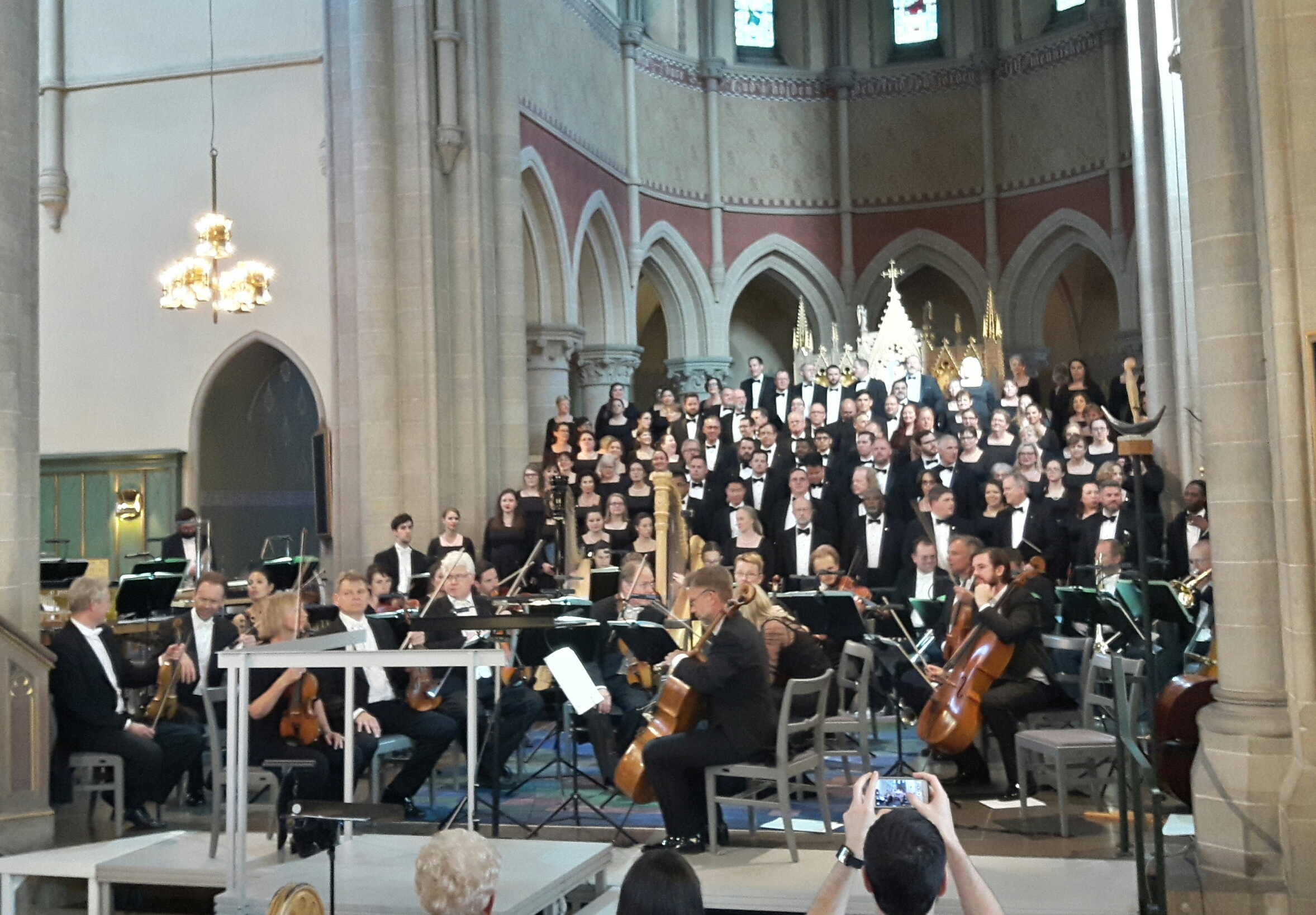
Performing in Örebro, Sweden

== Founding ==
The chorus was created in 1977 after a meeting between Dallas Symphony Orchestra music director and conductor Eduardo Mata, managing director Lloyd Halderman and University of Texas at Dallas chancellor Bryce Jordan. At Mata's request, the group created this vocal ensemble as a permanent addition to the orchestra in order to permit regular performances of major choral works.

The DSC's first performance as the official chorus of the Dallas Symphony took place under Mata's direction at the Music Hall at Fair Park on September 23, 1977, with a performance of the Mozart Mass in C minor. The chorus has since performed with more than 75 internationally distinguished conductors over the years.

== Director ==
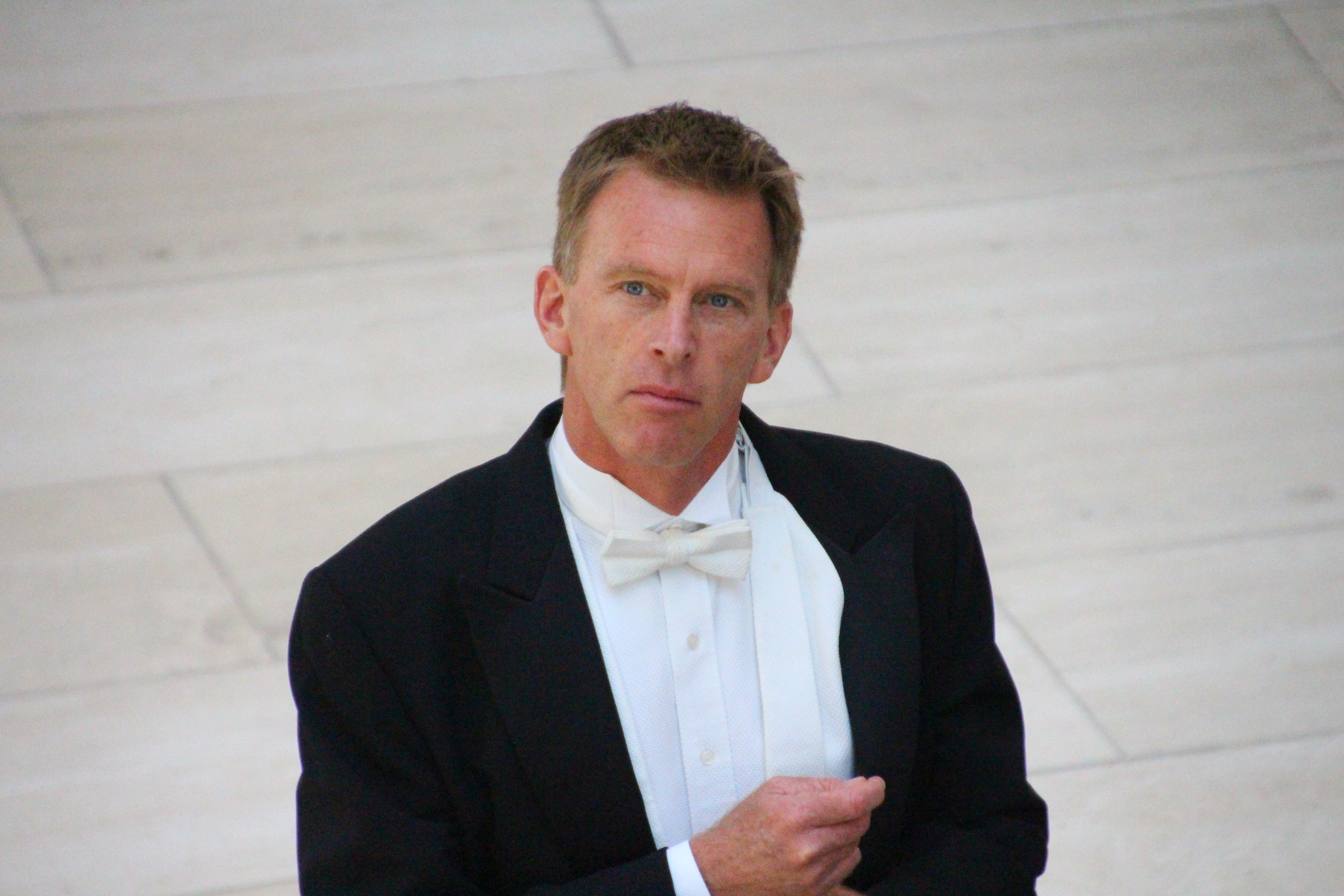
Joshua Habermann, director (2019)

Anthony Blake Clark was appointed to the position of Dallas Symphony Chorus Director in May 2023 to begin leading the chorus for the 2023/2034 symphony season. The prior director, Joshua Habermann, stepped down from the position in May 2022. In May 2015, the Dallas Symphony announced a significant endowment gift establishing the Jean D. Wilson Chorus Director Chair for the permanent director position. To date there have been seven permanent directors of the chorus, William Graham, Stewart Clark, Frank Sargent, Ronald Shirey, David R. Davidson, Joshua Habermann and Anthony Blake Clark.
