= Joanne Yeoh =

Malaysian violinist

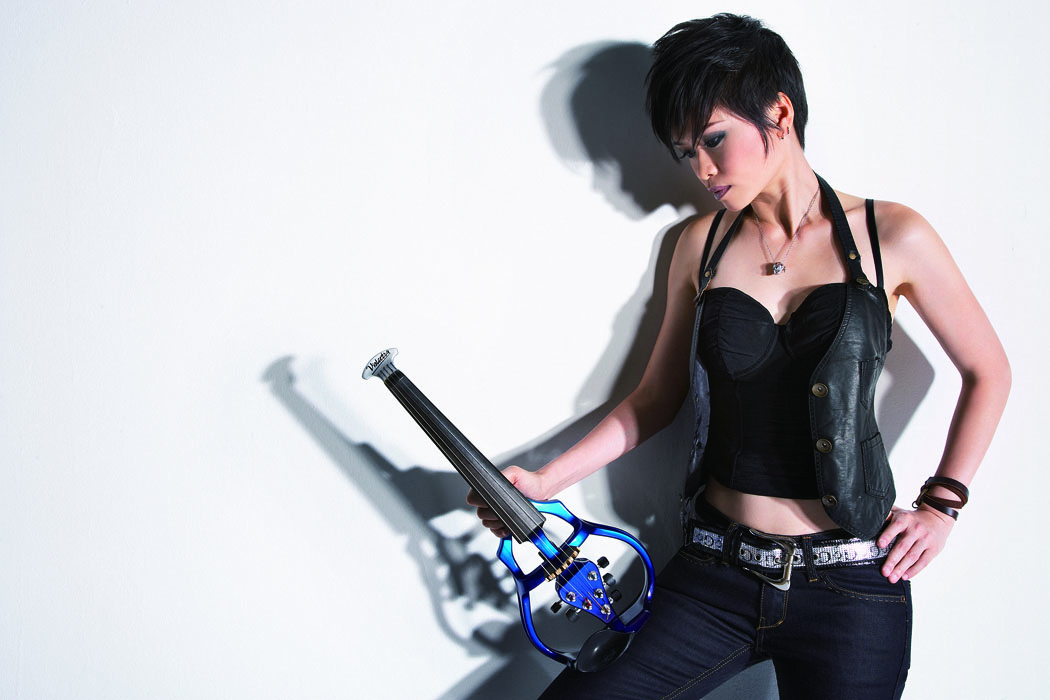
- Joanne Yeoh

Background information
- Born: Joanne Yeoh Pei Sze (simplified Chinese: 杨佩丝; traditional Chinese: 楊佩絲); 1977 (age 48–49); Malaysia
- Genre: Classical pop
- Occupation: Violinist
- Instrument: violin
- Website: Joanne Yeoh Official Website

Joanne Yeoh

Chinese name
- Traditional Chinese: 楊佩絲
Transcriptions
Standard Mandarin
- Hanyu Pinyin: Yáng Pèisī
- Wade–Giles: Yang2 P'ei4 Ssu
Yue: Cantonese
- Jyutping: Joeng4 Pui3 Si1
Southern Min
- Hokkien POJ: Iôⁿ Pōe-si
- Tâi-lô: Iônn Puē-si

Joanne Yeoh Pei Sze (simplified Chinese: 杨佩丝; traditional Chinese: 楊佩絲) is a Malaysian violinist who has performed both locally and on the international stage.

Dr Joanne Yeoh obtained a First Class Honours in her degree from Middlesex University, UK in 1998. Upon completing her degree, she was awarded the Luther and Ernest Gaunt Scholarship for Strings; and the Foreign and Commonwealth Office Scholarship to pursue a Masters in Music Performance (MMus) at the University of Leeds, UK. Joanne completed her PhD studies in Applied Psychology with Heriot-Watt University, UK in 2009; with a focus on music and consumer behaviour.

Since returning to Malaysia in 2000, Joanne was selected to participate in the Asian Youth Orchestra, travelling to Vietnam, Japan, Australia, Korea and Hong Kong. In 2002, Joanne performed alongside Hong Kong superstar Jacky Cheung in his Music Odyssey Tour 2002/03 covering over 40 concerts around the world. The following year, Joanne was selected to perform with Taiwanese singer David Tao in his Soul Power Tour 2003. In 2008, Joanne was invited to play with another Hong Kong superstar, Alan Tam. More recently, she played alongside Taiwanese singer songwriter Sam Lee in his concert, Me & Song 2024 at Macau. Her musical performances are much sought after by many corporate and international industries, among them Sony, Panasonic, Omega, Tag Heuer, Microsoft, HP, Audi, BMW, Ferrari, Rolls-Royce, Lamborghini, ESPN, British American Tobacco, Blackberry and Apple. Among the highlights include playing at the World Economic Forum at Davos, Switzerland in 2015.

She has won numerous awards including The Outstanding Young Malaysian Award, the National Academic Award and the British Council's Professional Achievement Award. She currently lectures as an Associate Professor at Universiti Putra Malaysia and is on the panel of music examiners for Trinity College London. Joanne is also a Consulting Editor for Musicae Scientiae journal. More recently, she has been signed on as a D'Addario artist.

Although classically trained, she also plays in contemporary settings. She has released three solo instrumental albums Pulse of the Metropolis in August 2005, After A Dream in 2013, and Life, Interrupted in 2021.

== Awards ==
- The Outstanding Young Malaysian Award 2004: Personal Improvement and Accomplishment
- Martell’s Rising Personality Award 2008.
- National Academic Award 2012: Arts and Creativity
- Malaysian Fujian Exemplary Performing Art Award 2017
- BrandLaureate Grand Master Brand ICON Leadership Award 2017
- McMillan Woods Global Icon Award 2019
- British Council Study UK Alumni Awards 2021: Professional Achievement Award Winner
- UCSI Praxis Alumni Award 2026
