= Nourhanne =

Lebanese singer

Nourhanne نورهان
- Origin: Lebanon
- Genre: Arabic music
- Instruments: Vocals
- Years active: 2003–present

Nourhanne (Arabic: نورهان) also transliterated as Nourhan, is a Lebanese singer.

Nourhanne was born to an ethnic Armenian family from Lebanon. She released her first single, "Ti Amo", but her full-length debut was not until 2003, with the release of her first album Shaklo Kif? (How Does He Look?) which spawned a series of hits across the Arab-speaking world, including her best-known recording, "Habibi ya Einy." That song was released in two versions, the original with traditional instrumentation and the "postmodern" remix that drew some attention in Europe in 2004.

In 2005 she received an annual award for "Best Young Arab Female Artist's Voice' at the "Oscar Video Clip Festival" [not related to the Academy Award Oscars] in Cairo, Egypt for her song "Men Zaman" (Far Away). In July 2006, Nourhanne released a new album, Tab Wana Mali, titled for her then-current hit, a cover of a traditional Egyptian song once performed by Nadia Lutfi (dubbed by artist Maha Sabri) in her 1959 film Bain al Qasrayn; Nourhanne's video partially reproduced a scene from the film that catapulted Lutfi to pan-Arab stardom. Nourhanne has also acted, starring in the Ahmad Hamdi directed film Al Khuruj Ela Al Hayat (Going out to Life).
