= Live at Montreux (The Dubliners album) =

Live album by The Dubliners
- Released: 1977
- Recorded: 1976
- Venue: Montreux Jazz Festival, Switzerland
- Genre: Folk rock
- Label: Intercord

The Dubliners chronology
A Parcel of Rogues (1976)	Live at Montreux (1977)	15 Years On (1977)

Live at Montreux is a live album by The Dubliners released in 1977. It featured Barney McKenna, Luke Kelly, John Sheahan and Jim McCann and was recorded at the Montreux Jazz Festival in 1976 and released on the former German Intercord label. The album was never released on CD, however, single tracks appeared on compilations. In 2016, the album was released on Spotify, Amazon music and other music services as an mp3 download with a new cover.

== Track listing ==
All tracks Traditional; arranged by The Dubliners; except where indicated

=== Side One ===
1. "Fermoy Lassies and Sporting Paddy"
2. "Lark in the Morning"
3. "Four Green Fields" (Tommy Makem)
4. "Sheahan's Selection - Belfast Hornpipe/Doherty's Reel/Honeymoon Reel/Acrobat/Village Bells/Colonel Rodney"

=== Side Two ===
1. "The Town I Loved So Well" (Coulter Martin)
2. "Kelly, the Boy from Killane"
3. "The Mason's Apron"
4. "Montreux Monto"
