= 1905 in Nordic music =

The following is a list of notable events and releases of the year 1905 in Nordic music.

== Events ==
- 17 March – Maurice Maeterlinck's 1892 play Pelléas and Mélisande is performed at the Swedish Theatre in Helsinki, Finland, with incidental music by Jean Sibelius, conducted by the composer himself.

== New works ==
- Edvard Grieg – Lyric Suite Op 54
- Erkki Melartin – Salome, Op. 41
- Oskar Merikanto – Fennia rediviva, Op. 55
- Helena Munktell – Violin Sonata, Op.21
- Ole Olsen – Trombone Concerto
- Jean Sibelius
  - Marjatta
  - Pelléas et Mélisande
- Emil Sjögren – Piano Sonata No.2, Op.44

== Births ==
- 5 February – Ulla Poulsen Skou, Danish ballerina (died 2001)
- 21 February – Birgit Kronström, Finnish actress and singer (died 1979)
- 22 February – Elling Enger, Norwegian composer and organist (died 1979).
- 25 February – Harald Lander, Danish dancer and choreographer (died 1971)
- 21 March – Ivar Haglund, US-born folk singer and restaurateur of Swedish-Norwegian parentage (died 1985)
- 15 October – Dag Wirén, Swedish composer (died 1986)
- 24 October – Kristian Hauger, Norwegian pianist, orchestra leader and composer of popular music (died 1977)

== Deaths ==
- 19 January – Emily Nonnen, British-born Swedish amateur musician, writer and translator (born 1812)
- 24 May – Joseph Dente, Swedish composer (born 1838)

== See also ==
- 1905 in Denmark
- 1905 in Norwegian music
- 1905 in Sweden
