= Gerald Shapiro (composer) =

American classical composer

Gerald M. Shapiro (born 1942 in Philadelphia) is an American composer of acoustic and electronic music. He has been a longtime faculty member at Brown University, where he served as Professor of Music and multiple terms as chair of the Department of Music. His compositions span orchestral, chamber, choral, electronic, and interdisciplinary works, and he is recognized as an early pioneer in audience-participation performance and live electronic music.

== Education ==
Shapiro studied first at the Eastman School of Music, where he received a Bachelor of Music degree with distinction in 1964.He continued graduate study at Mills College, where he studied composition with Darius Milhaud and received a Master of Arts in 1967.

His training also included study at the San Francisco Tape Music Center with Morton Subotnick; at the Conservatoire National in Paris with Olivier Messiaen; at the École Normale Supérieure de Musique in Paris with Nadia Boulanger; and at the University of California, Davis, where he studied with Karlheinz Stockhausen.

His principal composition teachers were Darius Milhaud, Morton Subotnick, Karlheinz Stockhausen, Olivier Messiaen, and Nadia Boulanger.

== Compositions (selective list) ==
- Antiphonies I, for piano and tape (1965)
- Winter Birch, for interactive audience participation and live electronics (1972)
- The Voice of the Dharma, for a cappella choir (1978)
- Nocturne, for chamber orchestra (1981)
- Phoenix, for vocal quartet and live electronics (1987)
- Trio No. 1, for violin, cello, and piano (1993)
- In Time's Shadow, for orchestra (1994)
- String Quartet No. 2 (1994)
- Epithalamium, for string quartet (1997)
- Mouvements perpetuels, for percussion quartet (1998)
- Trio No. 2, for violin, cello, and piano (2004)
