= Cambridge Buskers =

British musical duo

The Cambridge Buskers were a duo of British musicians, whose career began in the late 1970s and were subsequently called The Classic Buskers. They performed classical music humorously using many instruments, costumes and props.

Michael Copley and David Adam Gillespie (Dag) Ingram met when they were students at Cambridge University. According to the liner notes of their first recording, their musical association began when they found themselves at Blackfriars station without enough money for the fare to get home. In an attempt to raise the money from passers-by, they played The Entertainer and Eine kleine Nachtmusik for a while, until they were asked to leave by a London Transport official.

They rose to prominence in the UK by appearing on the popular televised Val Doonican Music Show several times between 1979 and 1984.

Subsequently, they gained international success with their performances and many recordings, and performed in over 20 countries and in 15 languages until September 2016, when they disbanded after an incident in Shanghai. It is reported that at one point a Japanese comic strip was written about them.

Ian Moore (now known as Ian de Massini), another Cambridge University graduate who is also an organist, conductor, composer and singer (formerly in King's College Choir, Cambridge), was the accordionist for the latter part of the Buskers' history.

The Classic Buskers wrote their own arrangements, primarily of classical works by famous composers. Ian Moore played piano accordion, used his voice, and occasionally other percussion instruments or props. Copley played a variety of woodwind instruments, including flute, recorder, ocarina, and crumhorn.

== Discography ==
Some of these LPs were released under different titles in different countries.

- A Little Street Music (1977)
- Between Pub & Podium (1977)
- Not Live From New York (1979)
- Another Serious Album (1981)
- Soap Opera (1982)
- Music Abbreviation 101 (1983)
- The Cambridge Buskers Handel Bach (1985)
- The Explosive Sound of The Cambridge Buskers (1985)
- The Cambridge Buskers Collection (2007) ABC (Aust) Classics 480 0136 (4 CD compilation. Over 130 tracks, mostly from the above LPs)
