= Wendy Vera =

Ecuadorian composer, songwriter, record producer and politician

Wendy Vera Flores
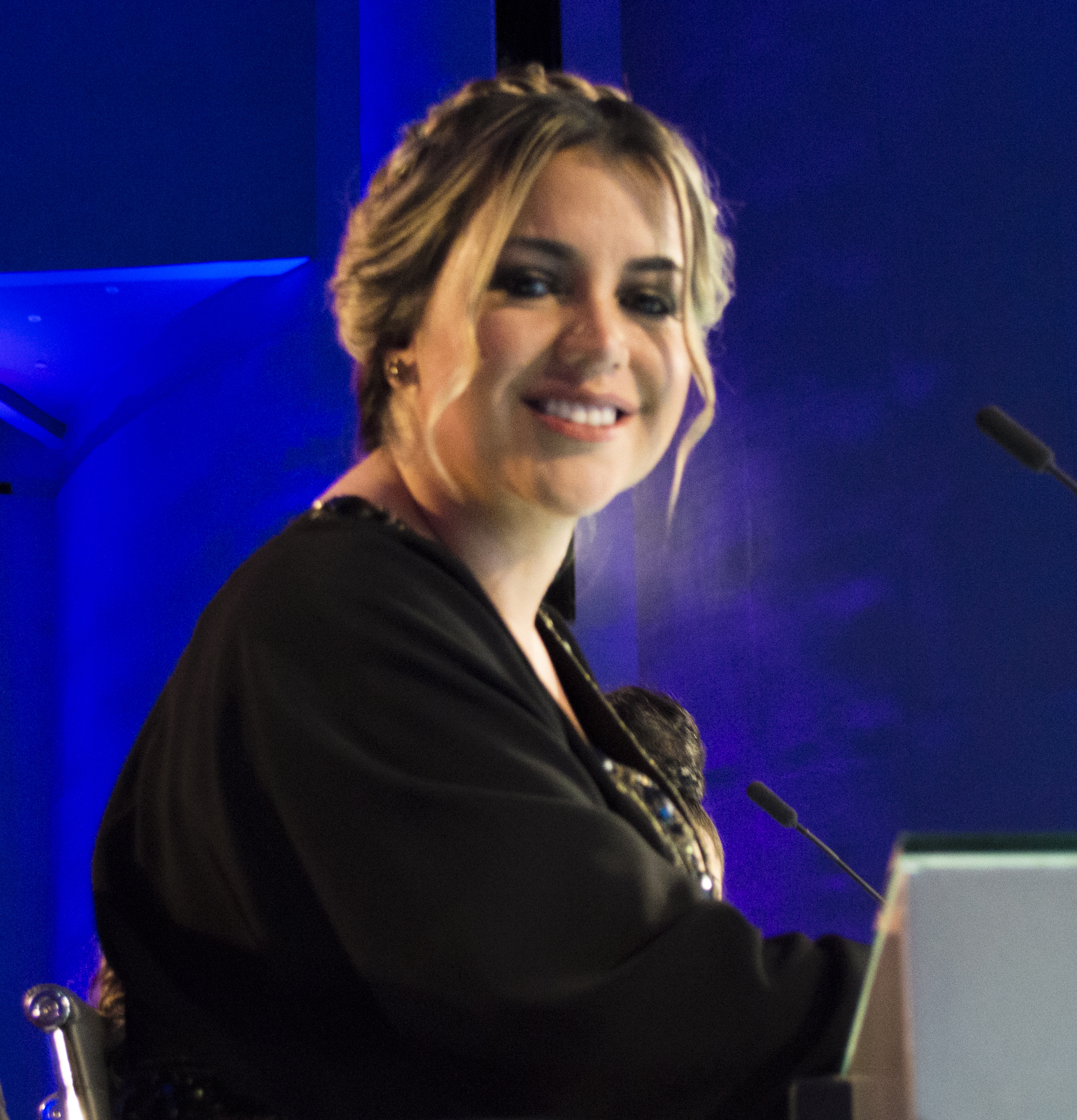
- Wendy Vera in 2014

Ecuadorian National Assembly
- Incumbent
- Assumed office 14 May 2017

Personal details
- Born: 5 October 1977 (age 48) Guayaquil
- Occupation: Politician, musician

Wendy Very Flores (born 5 October 1977) is an Ecuadorian composer, songwriter, record producer, and politician. She is most known for having formed the tecnocumbia group Chicas Dulces and for being a judge on Ecuador's Got Talent. Currently, she is a member of the National Assembly of Ecuador.

== Biography ==
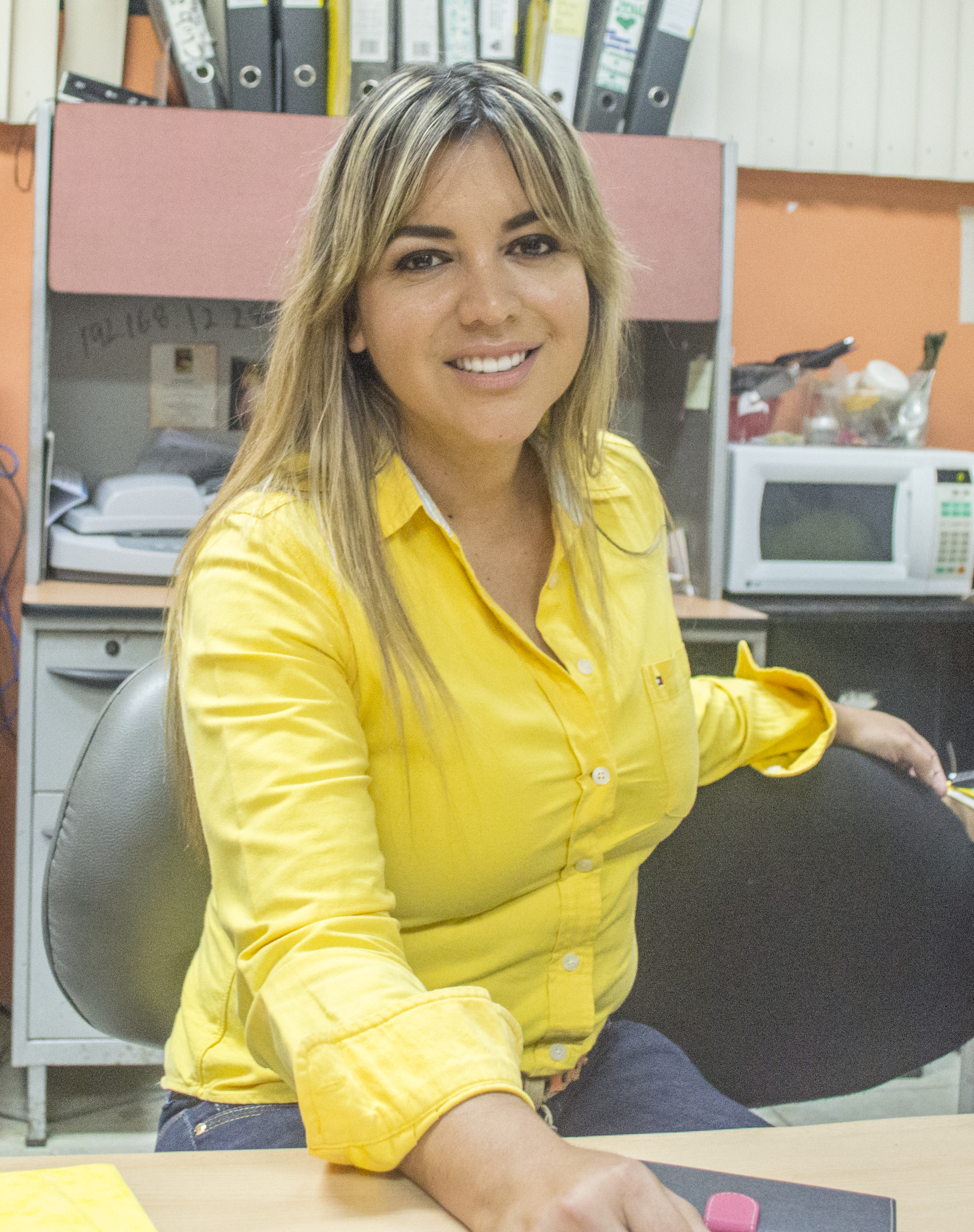
Wendy Vera in 2016

Wendy Veras was born in Guayaquil on 5 October 1977. From childhood, she showed an interest in music and art, learning to play the piano. Though her family wanted Veras to study a different vocation with better potential for financial security, she joined tecnocumbia group Caña Dulce when she was 17. While in her third year of law school in 1999, Veras formed Las Chicas Dulces, with Lila Flores as its vocalist and Veras its manager. Veras contracted Hodgkin's lymphoma, so she suspended her studies and sought chemotherapy in Solca, Romania. She stopped managing Las Dulces Chicas and though her health improved, the group dissolved.

In 2005, Veras was hired by the Ventura Music Group company Alejandro Jaén, since merged with Sony Music, to compose music for television. In 2011, she composed Miento to be performed by Angélica Vale for a webnovela on Univision, in Mexico. She has also composed music for Lorena Rojas and Julio Iglesias Jr., and was nominated for Billboard magazine's prize for regional music.
