= Wigor (rapper) =

Musician

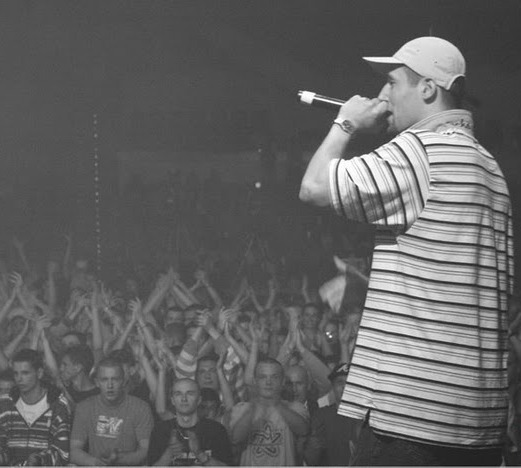
Wigor

Michał Dobrzański (born 7 November 1977), known by his stage name Wigor, is a Polish rapper and producer.

== Music career ==
=== Mor_W.A. (1995-) ===
Wigor was born in Warsaw. He started his career in the band 2CW and later on recorded his first professional album with Mor W.A., which he created in 1995 with two friends: Przemysław "Pepper" Rekowski and Przemysław "Łyskacz" Król. Their first album was recorded in 1998 and its title was Te słowa mówią wszystko. The first single on the album was called Żyć Nie umierać. Mor W.A. recorded two more albums: Dla Słuchaczy in 2004.

=== Solo career ===
In 2005, Wigor recorder a compilation album with Jerzy "Juras" Wroński entitled Wysokie Loty.
