= Earl Gill =

- Also known as: Tim Pat
- Born: Earl William Gill; 14 October 1932; Dublin, Ireland
- Origin: East Wall
- Died: 4 May 2014 (aged 81)
- Genres: Jazz, pop, country
- Occupations: Musician, bandleader, record producer
- Instrument: Trumpet
- Labels: Pye, Dolphin

Earl William Gill (14 October 1932 – 4 May 2014) was an Irish trumpet-player and bandleader who, with the Hoedowners, achieved fourteen Top 20 hits in the Irish charts between 1966 and 1973. As "Tim Pat", he also had a solo hit in 1971 with a novelty song, "Poor Poor Farmer".

== Early life and career ==
Earl Gill was raised in Dublin's East Wall district by his parents, William and Mary (née Hunter). His father was a pianist at the Queen's Theatre while his mother played the cello. As a boy Gill studied piano at the Royal Irish Academy of Music. However, at the age of twelve he was involved in an accident which led to the loss of the two middle fingers of his left hand. From then on he concentrated on the trumpet and was soon proficient enough to perform in public while still in his teens.

During the early 1950s, Gill played with several of Dublin's leading bands in venues such as the Olympia Theatre and the Gresham Hotel. In 1954, he formed his own band and within two years they were established as the resident dance band at the Shelbourne Hotel. Among the musicians who played in the Earl Gill Band during the 1950s was saxophonist Sonny Knowles who later found fame in Ireland as a cabaret singer. In 1959, Gill and his band were hired to back singer Ruby Murray on her tour of North America.

== Showband years ==
In 1965, Gill and his colleagues were signed up as the house band on a new Telefís Éireann country music show called Hoedown. Fronted by their new lead singer, Sean Dunphy, the band changed their name to the Hoedowners. A year later their single "Wonderful world of my dreams" reached number five in the Irish charts. The band achieved a further thirteen Top 20 hits between 1966 and 1973, becoming one of Ireland's most successful showbands. While most of their recordings highlighted Dunphy's singing voice, Earl Gill's trumpet took the lead on the instrumental single, "Sunset" (an arrangement of Offenbach's "Barcarolle"), released in 1967. "Sunset" failed to make the top twenty but Gill had greater success with his next solo recording, which he also produced. Wearing a false beard, shabby clothes and Wellington boots, he adopted the persona of "Tim Pat", a down-at-heel farmer who appeared on The Late Late Show to perform his new single, "The Poor Poor Farmer". The marketing ploy worked and the record rose to number three in the Irish Charts in February 1971.

== Later years ==
Following the disbandment of The Hoedowners in 1973, Gill continued to play a prominent role on the Irish music scene. He was one of a number of Irish jazz musicians, including Louis Stewart and Noel Kelehan, who performed together on an ad hoc basis at events such as the Cork Jazz Festival. Gill managed a number of pop groups, including folk rock act, Spud. He also produced recordings by The Dubliners. In the late-1970s and 1980s he was the musical director of several significant shows, including the Cavan International Song Contest, and Noel Pearson's production of Gilbert & Sullivan's H.M.S. Pinafore.

In 1990, Gill released his first solo album, Enchantment, on which he played a selection of traditional Irish melodies and popular show tunes. He continued to perform live throughout Ireland until his retirement in 2012.

== Personal life ==
Earl Gill died in hospital aged eighty-one and is buried in Shanganagh Cemetery. He was married to Deirdre Kenny who predeceased him. They had three children: Derek, Earl junior, and Susan. In March 1995 Gill married his second wife, Mavis Ascott, and they had a son named Robin.
