= 1897 in Nordic music =

The following is a list of notable events that occurred in the year 1897 in Nordic music.

== Events ==
- 27 April – Carl Nielsen's first choral work, Hymnus amoris, completed the previous year, receives its première at the Music Society (Musikforeningen) in Copenhagen, with the composer conducting. Viggo Bielefeldt, Tia Krëtma and Katie Adler are the soloists.
- 11 June – Norwegian composer Edvard Grieg and his wife Nina celebrate their 30th wedding anniversary at the Fossli Hotel near the Vøringfossen waterfall. In recognition of the occasion, Grieg would write his famous piano piece, "Gratulanterne kommer", later known as Wedding Day at Troldhaugen

== New works ==
- Hugo Alfvén – Symphony No. 1
- August Enna – Concerto for violin and orchestra in D major
- Ivar Hallstrom – Little Karin (opera)
- Johan Halvorsen
  - 2 Danses norvégiennes
  - Sarabande con variazioni
- Asger Hamerik – Symphony no. 6 ("Spirituelle") for string orchestra
- Ernst Mielck – Symphony in F minor, Op. 4
- Jean Sibelius – 9 Songs for Chorus, Op. 23

== Popular music ==
- Alice Tegnér
  - "Årstiderna"
  - "Lasse liten"

== Births ==
- 6 March
  - Ingrid Lang-Fagerström, Swedish royal harpist (died 1990)
  - Knudåge Riisager, Danish composer (died 1974)
- 17 April – Harald Sæverud, Norwegian organist, composer, and conductor (died 1992)
- 31 July – Eric Bengtson, Swedish film score composer (died 1948)
- 29 August – Helge Rosvaenge, Danish operatic tenor (died 1972)
- 22 September – Victor Cornelius (Corneliussen), Danish composer, pianist and singer (died 1961)
- 6 December – John Fernström, Swedish violinist, conductor and composer (died 1972)

== Deaths ==
- 17 October – Isidor Dannström, Swedish composer (born 1812)

== See also ==
- 1897 in Denmark
- 1897 in Norwegian music
- 1897 in Sweden
