= 1961 in Nordic music =

The following is a list of notable events and compositions of the year 1961 in Nordic music.

== Events ==
- 18 March – The 6th Eurovision Song Contest is held in France and won by Luxembourg. Finland compete for the first time, finishing in 10th place. Denmark finish 5th, Norway 7th and Sweden 14th.
- 4 August – The first Moldejazz festival opens in Molde, Norway, running until 6 August.
- unknown date – The Hootenanny Singers are formed in Sweden.

== New works ==
- Niels Viggo Bentzon – Concerto No. 2 for violin and orchestra
- Vagn Holmboe – String Quartet No. 6, Op. 78
- Magnús Blöndal Jóhannsson – Constellation
- Jón Leifs – Hekla, Op. 52" and the electronic work
- Einojuhani Rautavaara – Symphony No. 3

== Popular music ==
- Olle Adolphson – "Trubbel"
- Olaf Becker – "Når jeg står ved en bar", performed by Harry Felbert
- Simon Brehm, Sven Paddock and Gösta Stevens – "En tuff brud i lyxförpackning", performed by Lill-Babs.
- Jørgen Ingmann & His Guitar – "Apache" (cover version of Shadows' hit; #1 Canada; #2 Finland, US)

== New recordings ==
- John Coltrane – Live in Stockholm 1961
- Eric Dolphy Quartet – The Copenhagen Concerts

== Film music ==
- Bengt Hallberg & Simon Brehm – Svenska Floyd
- Egil Monn-Iversen – The Passionate Demons

== Births ==
- 6 January – Kenneth Sivertsen, Norwegian jazz guitarist and composer (died 2006)
- 24 May – Jarmo Savolainen, Finnish pianist and composer (died 2009)

== Deaths ==
- 19 February – Einar Fagstad, Norwegian accordionist, singer, actor and composer (born 1899)
- 8 May – Victor Cornelius (Corneliussen), Danish composer, pianist and singer (born 1897)
- 18 May – Viljo Vesterinen, Finnish accordion player and composer (born 1907)
- 29 May – Uuno Klami, Finnish composer (born 1900)
- 28 August – Carsten Carlsen, pianist and composer (born 1892).
- 23 September – Elmer Diktonius, Finnish poet, composer and musicologist (born 1896)
- 19 October – John Fernström, Swedish violinist, conductor and composer (born 1897)

== See also ==
- 1961 in Denmark
- 1961 in Iceland
- 1961 in Norwegian music
- 1961 in Sweden
