= 2024 in Nordic music =

The following is a list of notable events and releases in Nordic music in 2024.

== Events ==
- 5 January – Swedish band Grave announce that two long-term members, bass guitarist Tobias Cristiansson and guitarist Mika Lagrén, are leaving the band, with a result that 2024 live appearances are being put on hold.
- 16 January – Danish band Mercyful Fate announces that their US bassist Joey Vera is leaving, after several years filling in for the late Timi Hansen.
- 24 January – Turku Philharmonic Orchestra announces Helsinki-born John Storgårds as its new chief conductor, effective from the 2024–2025 season.
- 25 January – The Deutsche Radio Philharmonie Saarbrücken Kaiserslautern announces confirms the scheduled departure of Finland's Pietari Inkinen as its chief conductor at the close of the 2024–2025 season.
- 3 February – Norway's Melodi Grand Prix concludes, with progressive folk-rock band Gåte winning the right to represent the country at the Eurovision Song Contest, with their song "Ulveham".
- 26 February – Norwegian soprano Lise Davidsen stars in the Metropolitan Opera's revival of La Forza del Destino.
- 27 February – Danish band Mnemic announce that they are reuniting for a series of performances to mark their 20th anniversary.
- 2 March
  - At the 2024 final of Söngvakeppnin, "Við förum hærra" ("Scared of Heights"), sung by Hera Björk, is selected as Iceland's entry for the Eurovision Song Contest.
  - Erik Grönwall leaves US band Skid Row to prioritise his recovery from acute lymphoblastic leukemia.
  - Ars Nova Copenhagen appoints Sofi Jeannin its first female chief conductor, starting immediately.
- 21 March &ndash All four members of ABBA are appointed Commander, First Class, of the Royal Order of Vasa, by King Carl XVI Gustaf of Sweden.
- 7–9 May – The 68th edition of the Eurovision Song Contest is held in Malmö, Sweden. The highest-placed Scandinavian entry is Sweden, finishing 9th. Finland finishes 19th and Norway 25th. Iceland and Denmark are both eliminated at the semi-final stage.
- 22 May – Solution .45 announce that they are breaking up, blaming a lack of motivation.
- 15 May – Barbara Hannigan is announced as the next chief conductor and artistic director of The Iceland Symphony Orchestra; her contract begins in August 2026 for an initial three seasons.
- 12 June – The Malmö Symphony Orchestra announces that Martyn Brabbins will be its next chief conductor, effective with the 2025–2026 season.
- 12 July – The Pori Jazz Festival takes place in Finland.
- 18 August – Norwegian guitarist Galder announces that he is leaving Dimmu Borgir in order to concentrate on his own band, Old Man's Child.
- 9 October – The Danish String Quartet is awarded the 2025 Léonie Sonning Music Prize, the first ensemble to receive the prize in its history.
- 11–20 October – Stockholm Jazz Festival; stars include Bill Frisell, Julius Rodriguez, Sona Jobarteh, Gogo Penguin and The Headhunters.
- 7–9 November – The Iceland Airwaves music festival is held in Reykjavik and celebrates its 25th anniversary.
- 20 November – Iceland's Víkingur Ólafsson wins "Instrumentalist of the Year" at the 64th annual Musical America Artist of the Year awards.
- date unknown – Nightwish take a break from touring following the release of their tenth studio album.

== Albums released ==
=== January ===
Day	Artist	Album	Label	Notes	Ref.
8	Trollfest	20 Years in the Wrong Lane		20th anniversary compilation album	
16	Ribspreader	Reap Humanity	Xtreem Music		
26	Blood Red Throne	Nonagon	Soulseller Records		
26	Dead by April	The Affliction		Accompanied by tour of Finland	
26	Madder Mortem	Old Eyes, New Heart	Dark Essence Records		
26	Manticora	Mycelium	Mighty Music	"Mystic concept album"	

=== February ===
Day	Artist	Album	Label	Notes	Ref.
2	Artillery	Raw Live (At Copenhell)	Mighty Music	Live album	
9	Per Wiberg	The Serpent's Here	Despotz Records		
16	Crazy Lixx	Two Shots at Glory		Compilation album	
16	Ihsahn	Ihsahn	Candlelight Records	Includes orchestral version	
23	Amaranthe	The Catalyst	Nuclear Blast Records		
23	Borknagar	Fall	Century Media Records	Produced by Øystein Brun	
23	Hjerteslag	Betonglandskap	Fysisk Format		

=== March ===
Day	Artist	Album	Label	Notes	Ref.
1	Blind Channel	Exit Emotions	Century Media		
1	Kiuas	Samooja: Pyhiinvaellus		EP, recorded at Sonic Pump Studios	
5	Niklas Sundin	Wattudragaren	Inertial Music	Debut solo album	
15	Necrophobic	In the Twilight Grey	Century Media		
15	Sonata Arctica	Clear Cold Beyond	Atomic Fire		
22	Hamferð	Men Guðs hond er sterk	Metal Blade Records		
22	Khold	Du dømmes til Død	Soulseller Records		
22	Sylvaine	Eg Er Framand	Season of Mist	EP	
22	Unshine	Karn of Burnings	Rockshots Records		
28	The Quill	Wheel of Illusion	Metalville Records		

=== April ===
Day	Artist	Album	Label	Notes	Ref.
5	In Vain	Solemn	Indie Recordings	Vinyl double album	
5	Korpiklaani	Rankarumpu	Nuclear Blast		
12	Imminence	The Black		Produced by Henrik Udd	
12	Týr	Battle Ballads	Metal Blade Records		
19	Loch Vostok	Opus Ferox II – Mark of the Beast	ViciSolum Productions	Part 2 of Opus Ferox trilogy	
19	Lauri Porra	Matter & Time (Aineen ja ajan messu)	Platoon		
26	Darkthrone	It Beckons Us All	Peaceville Records		

=== May ===
Day	Artist	Album	Label	Notes	Ref.
3	Gothminister	Pandemonium II: The Battle of the Underworlds	Afm Records		
10	Hov1	Jag önskar jag brydde mig mer	EMI and Universal		
10	Anette Olzon	Rapture	Frontiers	featuring Magnus Karlsson	
17	Pain	I Am	Nuclear Blast		
24	Astrid S	Joyride	Universal/Island Records		
24	Trail of Tears	Winds of Disdain	The Circle Music	EP	
31	Candlemass	Tritonus Nights		Live album	
31	Marcus & Martinus	Unforgettable	Universal Music		

=== June ===
Day	Artist	Album	Label	Notes	Ref.
7	Aurora	What Happened to the Heart?	Decca Records	Studio album	
7	Apocalyptica	Plays Metallica Vol. 2	Bmg Rights Management GMBH	Covers album; featuring Robert Trujillo	
7	Evergrey	Theories of Emptiness	Napalm Records		
7	Kristine Tjøgersen	Between Trees	Aurora Records	With the Norwegian Radio Orchestra	
14	Teemu Keisteri	No Rules! Megamix	All Day Entertainment Oy	EP	
28	Illdisposed	In Chambers of Sonic Disgust	Massacre Records	featuring Ken Holst in place of Rasmus Henriksen	
28	Limbonic Art	Opus Daemoniacal	Kyrck Productions & Armour	—N/a	

=== July ===
Day	Artist	Album	Label	Notes	Ref.
4	Nifelheim	Unholy Death	Darkness Shall Rise Productions	Compilation album	
12	Amorphis	Tales from the Thousand Lakes – Live at Tavastia	Reigning Phoenix Music	Live album	
26	Dream Evil	Metal Gods	Century Media Records		

=== August ===
Day	Artist	Album	Label	Notes	Ref.
9	HammerFall	Avenge the Fallen	Nuclear Blast Records	13th album	
16	Dark Tranquillity	Endtime Signals	Century Media Records		
23	Koldbrann	Ingen Skånsel	Dark Essence Records		
30	Leprous	Melodies of Atonement	InsideOutMusic		
30	Wintersun	Time II/Time Package	Nuclear Blast	Compilation album	

=== September ===
Day	Artist	Album	Label	Notes	Ref.
6	Marduk	Beast of Prey: Brutal Assault		Live album from Brutal Assault Festival 2015	
13	Trelldom	...by the Shadows...	Prophecy Productions		
13	Wolfbrigade	Life Knife Death	Metal Blade Records		
19	Lamin	SkyLL	Universal Music Denmark		
20	Eclipse	Megalomanium II	Frontiers Music Srl		
20	Nightwish	Yesterwynde	Nuclear Blast Records		

=== October ===
Day	Artist	Album	Label	Notes	Ref.
1	Timo Tolkki	Classical Variations and Themes 2: Ultima Thule			
4	1349	The Wolf and the King	Season of Mist		
4	D-A-D	Speed of Darkness	AFM Records		
18	Astral Doors	The End of It All	Metalville Records	Anniversary album	
18	Ensiferum	Winter Storm	Metal Blade Records		
18	Funeral	Gospel of Bones	Season of Mist		
18	Grand Magus	Sunraven	Nuclear Blast Records	Beowulf-themed album	
18	Tungsten	The Grand Inferno	Reigning Phoenix Music		
25	Danilo Perez & Bohuslän Big Band	Lumen	Prophone Records		

=== November ===
Day	Artist	Album	Label	Notes	Ref.
1	Brothers of Metal	Fimbulvinter	AFM Records		
1	Tribulation	Sub Rosa in Æternum	Century Media Records		
1	Vola	Friend of a Phantom	Mascot Records		
8	Sólstafir	Hin Helga Kvöl		In readiness for Nordic Descent Tour 2024	
22	Opeth	The Last Will and Testament	Reigning Phoenix Music		
29	Konkhra	Sad Plight of Lucifer	Hammerheart Records		

== Eurovision Song Contest ==
- Denmark in the Eurovision Song Contest 2024
- Finland in the Eurovision Song Contest 2024
- Iceland in the Eurovision Song Contest 2024
- Norway in the Eurovision Song Contest 2024
- Sweden in the Eurovision Song Contest 2024

== Classical works ==
- Daniel Bjarnason – Fragile Hope
- Mats Larsson Gothe – Submarea
- Olli Mustonen – Sadunkertoja (flute concerto)
- Maja Ratkje – A Whisper, or a Prayer, or a Song
- Outi Tarkiainen – Mosaics for "A Fragile Hope"

== Film and television music ==
=== Musical films ===
- Spermageddon, with music by Christian Wibe

=== Film scores ===
- Hildur Guðnadóttir – Joker: Folie à Deux
- Uno Helmersson – Ibelin

== Deaths ==
- 23 January – Anders Sandberg, 55, Swedish vocalist (Rednex)
- 27 January – Lillebjørn Nilsen, 73, Norwegian singer-songwriter and folk musician
- 5 February – Riikka Hakola, 61, Finnish operatic soprano
- 13 February – Jussi Raittinen, 80, Finnish musician and composer
- 25 February – Georg Riedel, 90, Czechoslovak-born Swedish jazz double bass player and composer
- 23 March – Ulf Georgsson, 61, Swedish songwriter
- 3 April – Kalevi Kiviniemi, 65, Finnish concert organist
- 6 April – Dutty Dior, 27, Norwegian rapper
- 21 April – Kaj Chydenius, 84, Finnish musician and composer
- 21 April – Ingrid Fuzjko Hemming, 91, Swedish classical pianist
- 25 April – Kaisa Korhonen, 82, Finnish theatre director, actor and singer
- 29 April – Dagne Groven Myhren, 83, Norwegian folk musician and writer
- 18 May – Palle Danielsson, 77, Swedish jazz double bassist
- 4 June – C.Gambino, 26, Swedish rapper
- 9 June – Alex Riel, 83, Danish jazz and rock drummer
- 29 June – Martti Wallén, 75, Finnish operatic bass
- 16 July – Ulf Dageby, 80, Swedish rock musician, singer and songwriter
- 16 August – Tore Ylvisaker, 54, Norwegian keyboardist (Ulver)
- 21 August – Rolf Bækkelund, 99, Norwegian violinist and conductor
- 3 September – Göran Fristorp, 76, Swedish singer and songwriter
- 17 September – Matti Heinivaho, 88, Finnish musician and politician
- 3 October – Terje Bjørklund, 79, Norwegian jazz pianist and composer
- 4 November – Johnny Madsen, 73, Danish musician and artist
- 18 November – Bjørn Müller, 64, Norwegian rock singer (Backstreet Girls).
- 26 November – Anders Widmark, 61, Swedish jazz musician and composer
- 18 December – Heikki Silvennoinen, 70, Finnish musician, actor and comedian
- 19 December – Gaboro, 23, Swedish rapper
- 28 December – Lars Martin Myhre, 68, Norwegian composer, guitarist, and pianist
