= Russian guitar =

Seven-string acoustic guitar developed in Russia

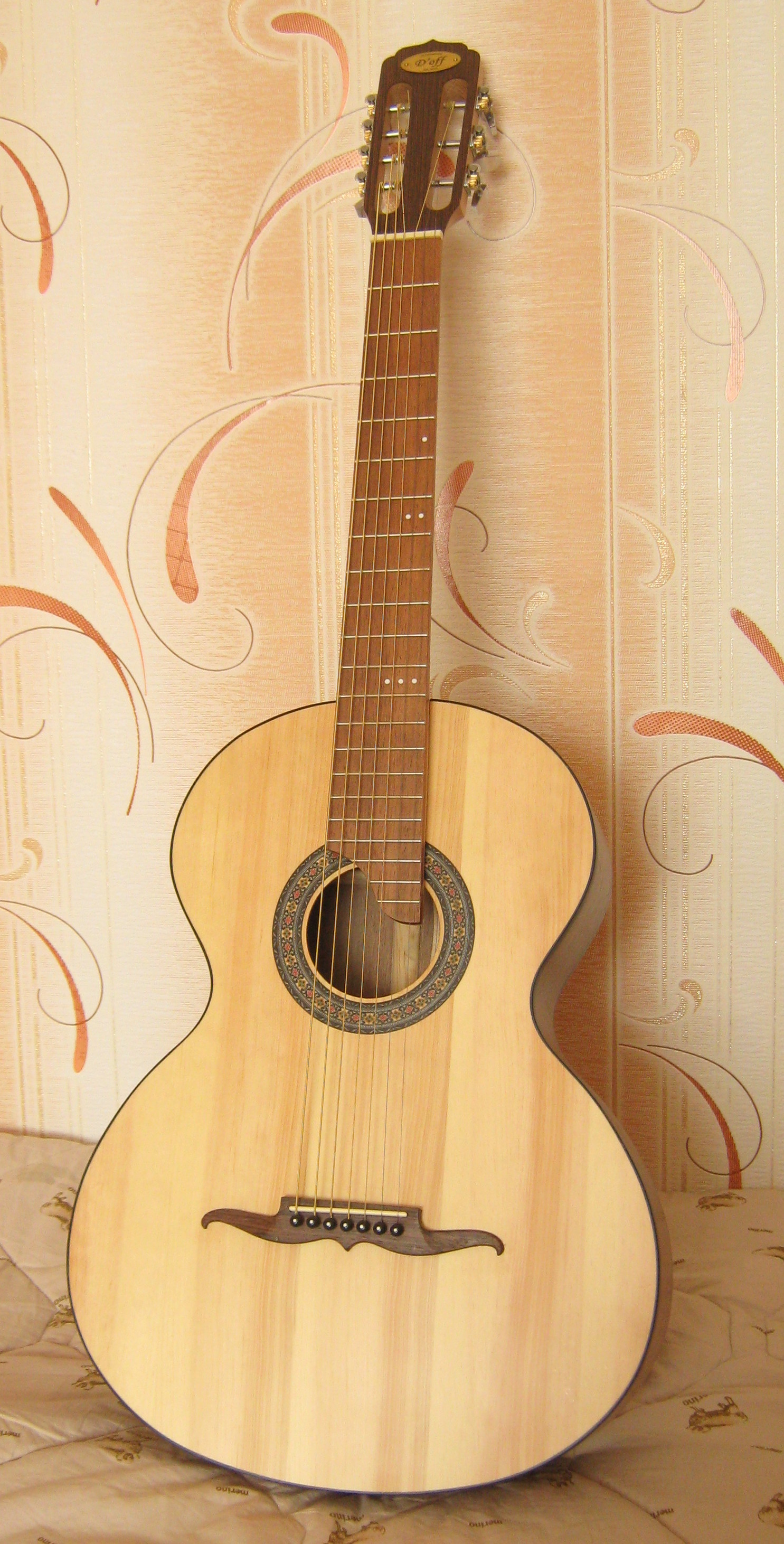
- A seven-string Russian guitar

String instrument
- Classification: Plucked string instrument
- Hornbostel–Sachs classification: 321.321 (Composite chordophone)

Playing range

Related instruments
- classical guitar, 6 string guitar

The Russian guitar (sometimes referred to as a "Gypsy guitar") is an acoustic seven-string guitar that was developed in Russia toward the end of the 18th century: it shares most of its organological features with the Spanish guitar. It is known in Russian as the semistrunnaya gitara (семиструнная гитара), or affectionately as the semistrunka (семиструнка), which translates to "seven-stringer". These guitars are most commonly tuned to an open G chord as follows: D_{2} G_{2} B_{2} D_{3} G_{3} B_{3} D_{4}. In classical literature, the lowest string (D) occasionally is tuned down to the C.

== History ==
Although in a number of sources the invention of the Russian guitar is attributed to Andrei Sychra (1773–1850), there are strong reasons to believe that the instrument was already in use when Sychra began his career. It is true that Sychra was very influential in creating the school of Russian guitar playing. He left over a thousand compositions, seventy-five of which were republished in the 1840s by Stellovsky, and then again in the 1880s by Gutheil. Some of these were published yet again in the Soviet Union in 1926.

The first known written instruction for 7-string guitar was published in St. Petersburg, on December 15, 1798, written by Ignaz Held (1766–1816).

The Russian version of the seven-string guitar has been used by professionals because of its great flexibility, but has also been popular with amateurs for accompaniment (especially Russian bards) due to the relative simplicity of some basic chords and the ease of playing alternating bass lines.

The instrument shares most of its organological features with the Spanish guitar. Some specialists insist on English guitar or baroque lute descent for its open G tuning.

== Construction ==
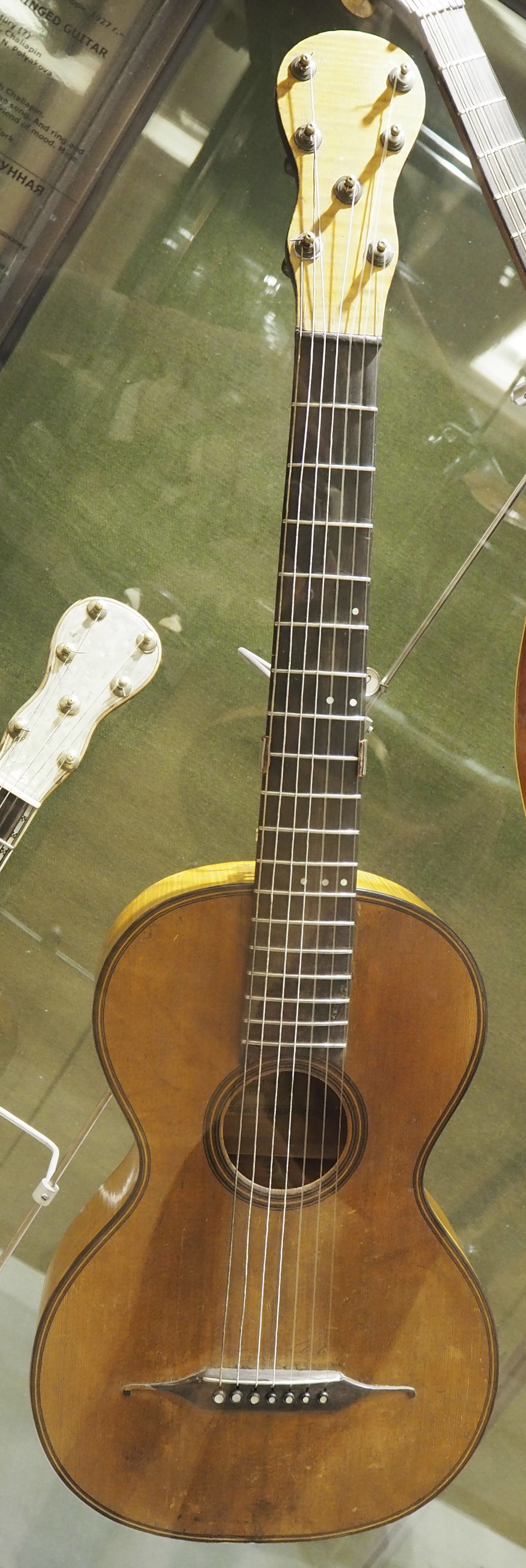
The Russian Guitar by Ivan Krasnoshchekov

Construction of the Russian is very similar to that of the western 6-string guitar except for the additional string. The same basic components are present: headstock; nut; tuners; neck; fingerboard; frets; inlays; truss rod (in modern instruments); heel; body; bridge & bridge saddle; soundboard (top); sound hole and rosette; back; sides; strings. Woods used and internal bracing layouts are also similar.

=== Types ===
There are two basic types of Russian guitar: the "classical" model and the "gypsy" model. The classical model closely resembles the western 6-string classical guitar, and has nylon or gut strings. The gypsy model is steel strung, and resembles the western 6-string steel-string acoustic guitar, although more size and shape variations are found among gypsy guitars.

A two-necked version of the Russian guitar was also once popular; these guitars usually had 11 or 12 strings—one neck with seven fretted strings, and another with four or five unfretted strings. There are also some rare specimens that were built with an oval body.

=== Head ===
The head or "headstock" is located at the end of the guitar neck farthest from the body. Modern instruments are fitted with machine head tuners, though older instruments (particularly from the 19th century) have friction pegs. The tuner layout is usually in one of two forms: "4+3", with four tuners on the bass-string side of the head and three on the treble string side; or "3+1+3", with three tuners on each side of the headstock and one in the middle. The nut is a small strip traditionally of bone, but plastic, brass, and other materials are also sometimes seen.

=== Neck ===
Headstock, fingerboard (fretboard), and truss rod (if present), all attached to a long wooden extension which collectively constitutes the neck. The wood used to make the fretboard usually differs from the wood in the rest of the neck. The neck joint or heel is the point at which the neck is attached to the body of the guitar.

=== Fingerboard ===
The fingerboard is made of hardwood (ebony or rosewood are common), fitted with metal frets of brass or steel. Fret spacing almost always follows the western twelve tone equal temperament (12-tet) system. The surface of the fingerboard may be flat or curved slightly ("radiused"), although the radius of a curve on the Russian guitar is usually somewhat less than that of an equivalent western 6-string guitar. Inlayed position markers are common, and appear in the same locations as 6-string guitars (e.g., typically the 5th, 7th, 9th, and 12th frets, among others).

=== Body ===
The sound board is usually made of spruce or cedar, and sized and shaped much like that of the 6-string guitar. Overall proportions of classical seven string instruments (nylon string) are similar to those of 6-string guitars. "Gypsy" instruments (steel string) may be proportioned similarly, but also may often feature a narrower upper bout, and an enlarged sound hole. Both traditionally shaped instruments and instruments with cut-away bodies are available.

The bridge is made of a hardwood similar to that used for the fingerboard, and the bridge saddle is usually bone or sometimes plastic; on old instruments, ivory was sometimes used.

A pickguard, or "scratchplate"—usually a piece of laminated plastic—is frequently found on steel-string "gypsy" instruments; on nylon-string classical instruments it is usually lacking.

=== Strings ===
As noted above, Russian guitars may have either nylon (or equivalent non-metal) strings, or steel (or equivalent metal) strings, depending on whether the instrument is a classical or gypsy guitar. On classical instruments the four lower pitched strings are generally wound, and the three higher strings are of plain material. On gypsy instruments five strings are wound, and the top two are plain.

=== Measurements ===
Proportions of Russian guitars typically do not differ greatly from those of western 6-string instruments. Since the range of both types of instrument are comparable, this makes acoustical sense. One notable physical difference, however, concerns string spacing: since Russian guitars have essentially the same neck width as 6-string guitars, the 7 strings on the Russian instruments are necessarily closer together.

Comparison of dimensions:

| | Classical 6-string | Russian 7-string |
|---|---|---|
| Overall length | 990 mm (39 in) | 1,000 mm (39 in) |
| Length of body | 490 mm (19 in) | 490 mm (19 in) |
| Width, lower bout | 368 mm (14.5 in) | 365 mm (14.4 in) |
| Width, waist | 245 mm (9.6 in) | 245 mm (9.6 in) |
| Width, upper bout | 270 mm (11 in) | 260 mm (10 in) |
| Depth of body | 112 mm (4.4 in) | 114 mm (4.5 in) |
| Sound hole diameter | 89 mm (3.5 in) | 90 mm (3.5 in) |
| Fingerboard scale | 630–650 mm (25–26 in) | 610–650 mm (24–26 in) |
| Neck width at nut | 49–51 mm (1.9–2.0 in) | 46–50 mm (1.8–2.0 in) |
| Fretboard type | flat | radial |
| Neck type | round corners | annual rings |

=== Handedness ===
Left-handed Russian guitars exist, but are extremely rare.

== Tuning ==
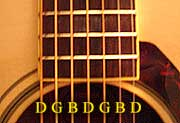
For the seven-string Russian guitar, the open strings form a G-major chord.

Traditionally, Russian and Spanish guitars are tuned differently. On the Spanish guitar the open-string chord is an Em11(omit9), while on the Russian guitar it is a G-major. While the Spanish guitar is tuned in fourths with one (major) third (G_{3}–B_{3}), the Russian guitar is tuned in thirds (G_{2}–B_{2}, B_{2}–D_{3}, G_{3}–B_{3}, and B_{3}–D_{3}) with two fourths (D_{2}–G_{2}, and D_{3}–G_{3}):

D_{2} G_{2} B_{2} D_{3} G_{3} B_{3} D_{4}

=== Derivation ===
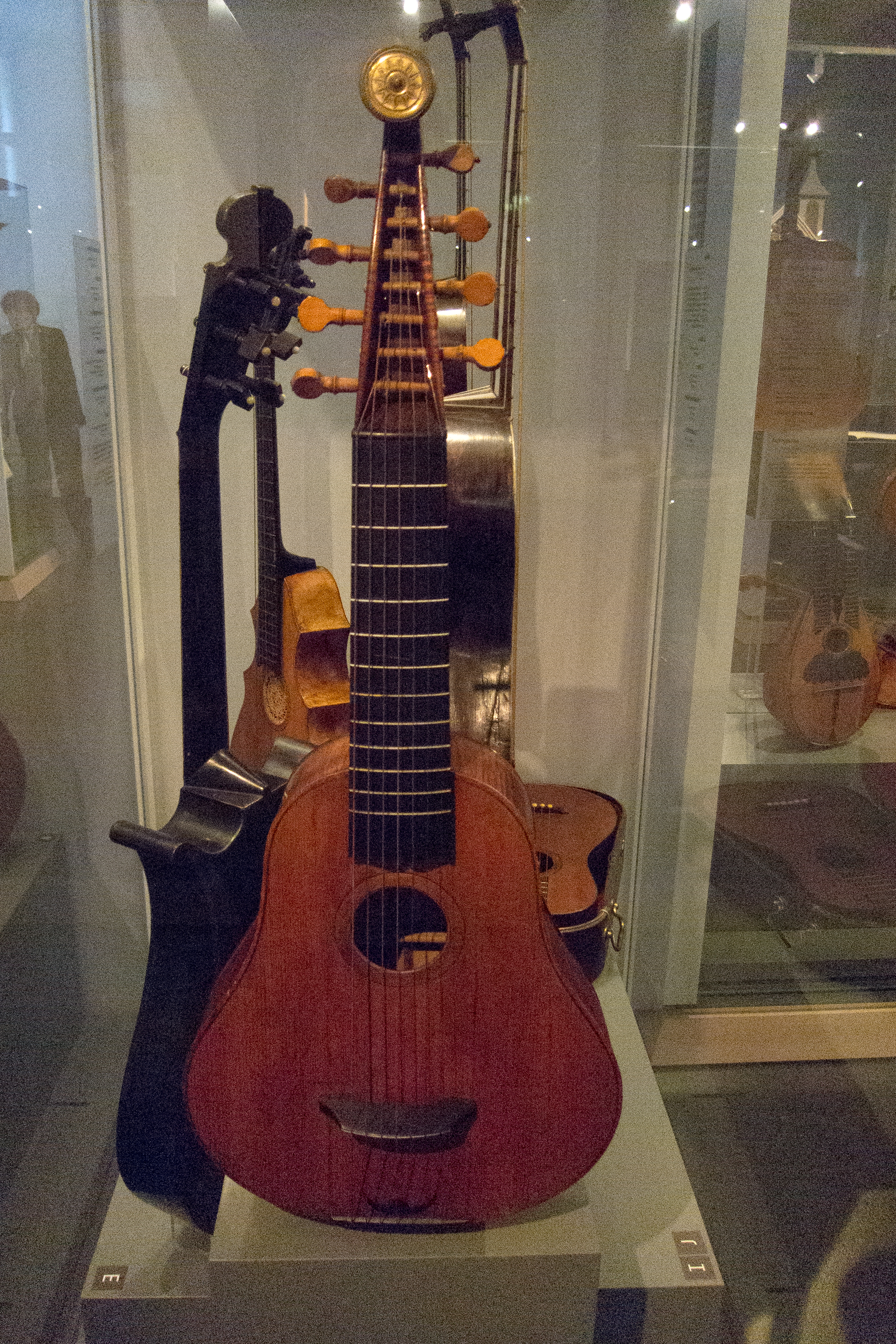
"Sister" (Deutsche Guitarre) by Johann Wilhelm Bindernagel, circa 1800

This tuning is thought to have been derived from the baroque cittern of the Waldzither type. According to the historical article by Valerian Rusanov, "there was a cittern player in Gotha, named Scheidler, who enhanced the tuning by addition a bass string". These musical instruments, made by Gerard J. Deleplanque, G. Le Blond, Johann Georg Ochstermann and Johann Wilhelm Bindernagel, were delivered via Elbe river, and still awaits a recognition from lovers of Russian romance in Glinka Museum in Moscow, as well as in the Leipzig Musical Museum. Known as "Deutsche Guitarre", two hundred years ago they already had some of the hallmarks of a modern seven-string guitar, including "Viennese" bracing and a radial fretboard. One of the first performers on seven-string citterns in Germany were Johann David Scheidler and Johann Clauduis Hanff, the second later worked in St.-Petersburg in Russia.

Years after Johann David Scheidler, there was another guitar player, Christian Gottlieb Scheidler who also played in open G tuning on Lute in Mainz, but there is no evidence that they were relatives.

=== Reverberation and echoing ===
Some guitar historians insist that the Russian seven-string tuning was invented in 1793 by Andrey Sychra, acknowledged harpist of the 18th century, in order to adapt a harp tuning for guitar, and facilitate the playing of harp-like arpeggios:

Sychra as well played on a six-string guitar. And while being a great musically gifted person and talented virtuoso of the harp, at the end of XVIII in Moscow he, from the 6-string guitar, constructed the instrument close to the harp, especially by harp-like arpeggios, and at the same time more melodic than harp. He attached a 7th string to the guitar and changed tuning as well.

— Stakhovich M.A., Seven string guitar history essay, The Muscovite magazine, 1854, vol.IV, No.13, p.3–5

This sound, resembling a runaway stream of pure fifths, was discovered by Sychra.

== Performance practice ==
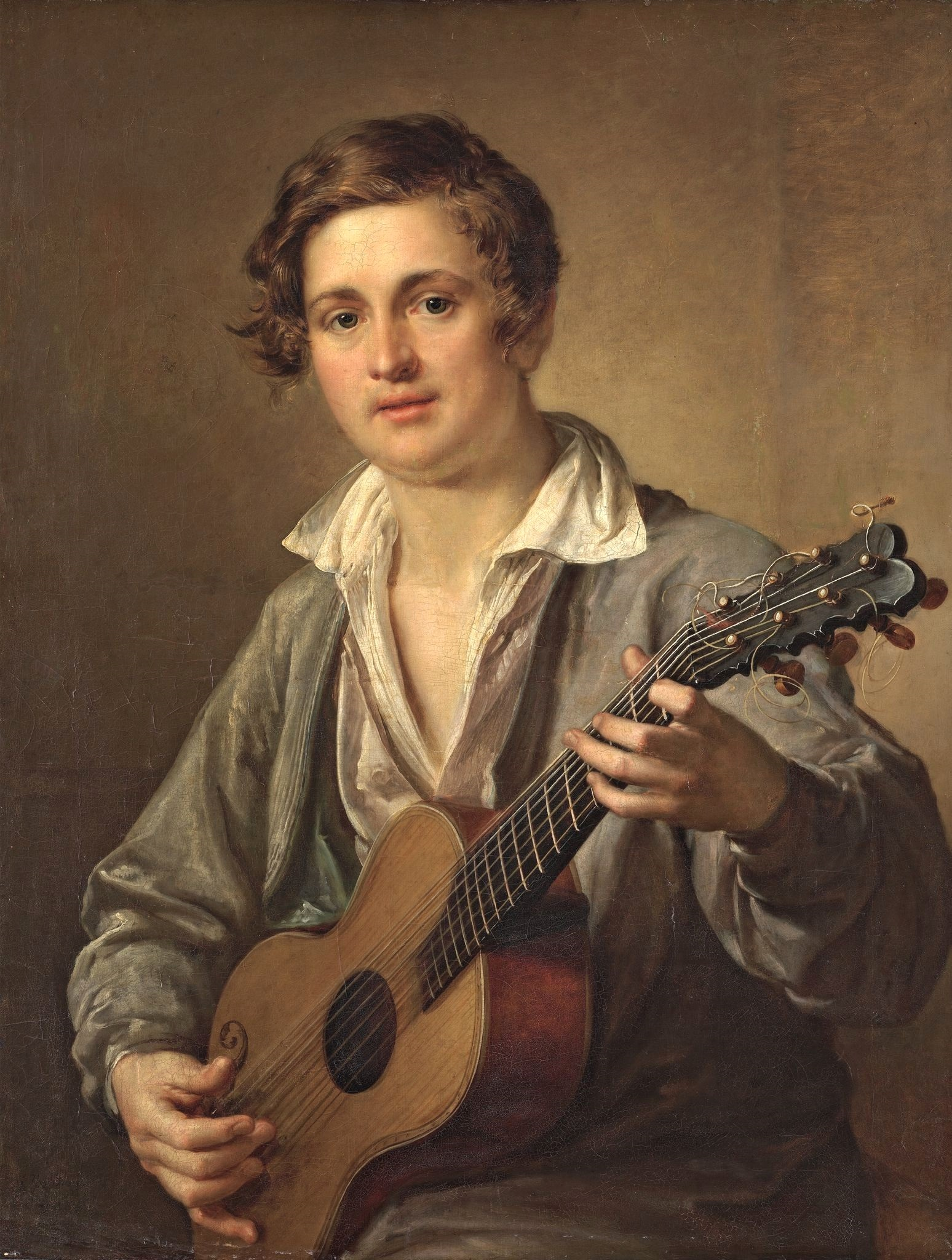
"The Guitar Player" by V.A. Tropinin (1823)

The Russian guitar is traditionally played without a pick, using fingers for either strumming or picking. It is notable that use of the thumb to fret strings on the neck is a feature of standard technique on the Russian guitar, whereas such use of the thumb is eschewed in western classical technique.

The open G tuning allows major chords to be played with only one finger of the fretting hand (the left hand for right-handed guitars), as barre chords. The A-major chord can be played most easily as a barré on the second fret, the B major as a barré on the fourth, C major on the fifth, D major on the seventh, and so on (although other, more involved major shapes are employed as well for a variation in voicing). A fair amount of open-G chord shapes use six or five strings, and so these shapes require the player to mute or not play particular strings.

Perhaps the most audible difference between the Spanish and Russian tunings is in the ability to play chords with a tighter, more piano-like voicing on the latter. For example, an E-minor chord on a Spanish guitar (as 022000) is usually played in the order, from low to high, of E (root), B (fifth), E (root), G (minor third), B (fifth) and again E (root). On a Russian guitar it is possible to play the E minor (2002002) as E (root), G (minor third), B (fifth), E (root), G (minor third), B (fifth), and E (root) — or to play it with the same voicing as the six string E minor (using 99X9989).

This tighter voicing is particularly audible with seventh chords, including the rootless seventh chord (seventh chords without a root note, actually a diminished chord).

It is fairly common for Russian guitar players (particularly those accompanying themselves singing, such as bards) to bring the tuning up or down several steps as desired, either to accommodate the voice or for varying string tension. Vladimir Vysotsky often tuned down a whole step, sometimes even a step and a half to an open E. Also, variations in the open G tuning were fairly common, e.g., Bulat Okudzhava would use the tuning of D_{2} G_{2} C_{3} D_{3} G_{3} B_{3} D_{4} to play songs written in C, while bard Sergey Nikitin tuned his guitar to an open G minor: D_{2} G_{2} C_{3} D_{3} G_{3} B♭_{3} D_{4}.

There are more than 1,000 different chords possible for the standard open G tuning and plenty of different schools for left hand (vibrato) and right hand (fingerstyle playing) and classical music musical transposition archives and music composed for Russian 7-string guitar for 200 years in Russia. Because much of this music was published during the years of the Soviet Union, little of it left Russia, and printed scores of music for Russian guitar are difficult to come by in Europe or North America.

=== Six string adaptations ===
A common practice for six string guitar players of Russian romances and bard music is to retune their guitars using variations of the seven string tuning, such as:

- G_{2} B_{2} D_{3} G_{3} B_{3} D_{4} (no bass D string, also known as "dobro open G")
- D_{2} B_{2} D_{3} G_{3} B_{3} D_{4} (no low G)
- D_{2} G_{2} D_{3} G_{3} B_{3} D_{4} (no low B, the standard six-string open G tuning used by bard Alexander Rozenbaum)
- D_{2} G_{2} B_{2} G_{3} B_{3} D_{4} (no middle D, used by Bulat Okudzhava in his latter years when he adopted a six string)

and so on.

== Popularity ==
For many years, the seven-string guitar was far more popular in Russia than the regular six-string Spanish guitar; the latter was a rarity in Russia before the revolution of 1917. The Russian guitar gained significant popularity in the latter half of the 19th century with the increasing popularity of guitar oriented "city romance" songs.

The six-string first came to serious prominence in the Russian classical guitar world when Andrés Segovia toured Soviet Russia in 1926. Possibly looking for something new and exciting to give life to their repressed craft, many Russian classical guitarists began making a switch to the six-string and the EADGBE tuning. Classical guitarist Piotr Agafoshin made the switch, and wrote a Russian book on six string technique that remains a standard to this day.

The Russian guitar remained the standard for popular musicians until the 1960s, when a strong interest in underground music such as jazz and Western rock acts such as the Beatles and Elvis Presley developed.

However, the parallel emergence of Russian bard music, which relied heavily on popular Russian guitar technique used in "urban romances", kept the seven-string guitar relevant. Actor Vladimir Vysotsky, arguably Russia's most prominent bard, retained his monogamous relationship with the seven string up to his death in 1980. Pioneering bard Bulat Okudjava switched to the six string in the early 1990s, but continued tuning it in open G (skipping the middle D).

Thanks to the "bard boom" and cheap factory production, a Russian guitar could be bought new for as little as 12 roubles in the 1970s. Soviet factories continued to manufacture the seven string exclusively for quite a long time before making a gradual switchover to accommodate the demand for six string guitars in the mid to late 1970s. Prior to that, western pop and rock oriented guitarists had a tradition of modifying cheap factory made Soviet seven string guitars to six strings (or sometimes to bass guitars) and retuning them to the EADGBE tuning, or as a 7 string use BEADGBE tuning.

Conversely, Russian émigré guitarists living in western countries, where only six string guitars were available, have been known to modify six string (and sometimes twelve string) acoustic guitars to seven string instruments, in order to better play their favorite Russian songs.

Recently, the repertoire for the Russian guitar has been the subject of a new scholarly examination and has seen increased performance due to the work of Oleg Timofeyev, who has unearthed and recorded works by the composer Matvei Pavlov-Azancheev (1888−1963).

== Notable composers for Russian guitar ==
- Yevgeny Bachurin
- Ignaz von Held
- Sergei Orekhov
- Matvei Pavlov-Azancheyev
- Vassily Sarenko
- Andrei Sychra
- Vladimir Vavilov
- Mikhail Vysotsky
- Vladimir Vysotsky

== See also ==
- Bard (Soviet Union)
- Guitar
- Guitarra séptima
- Music of Russia
- Russian traditional music
- Seven-string guitar
