= List of symphonies in F minor =

This is a list of symphonies in F minor written by notable composers.

Composer	Symphony	Notes
Hugo Alfvén	Symphony No. 1, op. 7	(1896–97, rev.1904)
Josef Bárta	Symphony	(before 1787)
Havergal Brian	Symphony No. 14	(1959–60)
Havergal Brian	Symphony No. 22 "Sinfonia Brevis"	(1964–5)
Max Bruch	Symphony No. 2, op. 36	(1870)
Anton Bruckner	Study Symphony, WAB 99	(1863, premiere March 18, 1923)
Henri Dallier	Symphony No. 1, op. 50	(1908)
Ruth Gipps	Symphony No. 1, op. 22	(1942)
Henry Kimball Hadley	Symphony No. 2 "The Four Seasons", op. 30	(1899)
Joseph Haydn	Symphony No. 49 "La Passione"	(1768)
Alan Hovhaness	Symphony No.26, Op. 280	(1975)
Jānis Ivanovs	Symphony No. 3	(1938)
Paul Juon	Rhapsodische Symphonie, Op.95	(1937-8)
Jan Kalivoda	Symphony No. 1, op. 7	(about 1826)
Paul von Klenau	Symphony No. 1	(1908)
Joseph Kohaut or Karl Kohaut	Sinfonia in F minor	
August Klughardt	Symphony No. 2, op. 34	(1876)
Joseph Martin Kraus	Symphony in F minor, VB 130	
George Alexander Macfarren	Symphony No. 4	(1833)
Ludwig Wilhelm Maurer	Symphony, op. 67	
Ernst Mielck	Symphony, Op. 4	(1897)
Nikolai Myaskovsky	Symphony No. 10, op. 30	(1926–27)
Nikolai Myaskovsky	Symphony No. 24, op. 63	(1943)
George Onslow	Symphony No. 3	(1833–34, rev. of a quintet from 1826)
Carlo d'Ordonez	Symphony, Brown F12	
Ernst Pepping	Symphony No. 2	(1943)
Wilhelm Peterson-Berger	Symphony No. 3 "Same Ätnam" ("Lappland Symphony")	(1913–15)
Ignaz Pleyel	Symphony, Ben. 138	(1786)
Joachim Raff	Symphony No. 10, op. 213 "Zur Herbstzeit" ("In Autumn")	(1879)
Anton Reicha	Symphony	(written during his time in France)
Emil von Reznicek	Symphony No. 4	(1919)
Franz Xaver Richter	Symphony No. 43	(published in the 1770s)
Guy Ropartz	Symphony No. 2	(1900)
Jakob Rosenhain	Symphony No. 2, op. 43	(performed in 1849, not published until 1883?)
Martin Scherber	Symphony No. 2	(1951–52)
Georg Schumann	Symphony No. 2, op. 42	(1905)
Johanna Senfter	Symphony No. 7, op. 84	
Vissarion Shebalin	Symphony No. 1, op. 6	(1925)
Dmitri Shostakovich	Symphony No. 1, op. 10	(1924–25)
Sergei Slonimsky	Symphony No. 1	(1958)
Charles Villiers Stanford	Symphony No. 3 "Irish", op. 28	(1887)
Richard Strauss	Symphony (No. 2), op. 12	(1883)
Karol Szymanowski	Symphony No. 1, op. 15	(1906-07)
Pyotr Ilyich Tchaikovsky	Symphony No. 4, op. 36	(1877)
Ferdinand Thieriot	Symphony	(written in Graz, 1872)
Heinz Tiessen	Symphony No. 2, op. 17 "Stirb und Werde!"	(1912)
Charles Tournemire	Symphony No. 5, op. 47	(1913/4)
Marcel Tyberg	Symphony No. 2	(1927)
Ralph Vaughan Williams	Symphony No. 4	(1931–34)
Karl Weigl	Symphony No. 4	(1936)
Mieczysław Weinberg	Symphony No. 5, op. 76	(1962)
Charles-Marie Widor	Symphony No. 1, op. 16	(1870)
Charles-Marie Widor	Symphony for Organ No. 5, op. 42, no. 1	(1879)
Meredith Willson	Symphony No. 1 "A Symphony of San Francisco"	(1936)
William Wordsworth	Symphony No. 1, op. 23	
