= 1948 in Nordic music =

The following is a list of notable events and compositions of the year 1948 in Nordic music.

== Events ==
- unknown date – Jón Leifs sets up the Performing Rights Society of Iceland (STEF).

== New works ==
- Einar Englund – Symphony No. 2, "Blackbird"
- Vagn Holmboe – Concerto No. 11 for trumpet and orchestra

== Popular music ==
- Hugo Alfvén – "Linden"
- Hugo Lindh – "Flottarkärlek"
- Evert Taube – "Så skimrande var aldrig havet"

== Film music ==
- Sven Gyldmark – Støt står den danske sømand
- Erland von Koch – Musik i mörker
- Charles Redland – Marknadsafton
- Sven Sköld – Flickan från fjällbyn
- Gunnar Sønstevold – Kampen om tungtvannet

== Births ==
- 26 April – Pekka Streng, Finnish rock musician (died 1975)
- 1 May – Carl Morten Iversen, Norwegian jazz bassist (died 2023)
- 26 May – Göran Fristorp, Swedish singer and songwriter (died 2024)
- 30 August – Jukka Tiensuu, Finnish composer
- 20 November – Martti Wallén, Finnish operatic bass (died 2024)
- 14 December – Peter Thorup, Danish blues guitarist, singer and composer (died 2007)
- 22 December – Stein Ove Berg, singer and songwriter (died 2002).

== Deaths ==
- 6 April – Eric Bengtson, Swedish film score composer (born 1897)
- 14 June – Ernst Ellberg, Swedish violist and composer (born 1868)
- 22 August – Frantz Rabinowitz, Danish baritone (born 1918)
- 4 October – Camillo Carlsen, Danish composer (born 1876)
- 8 October – Sven Körling, Swedish composer (born 1879)

== See also ==
- 1948 in Denmark
- 1948 in Iceland
- 1948 in Norwegian music
- 1948 in Sweden
