= Bergenfest =

Annual music festival in Bergen, Norway

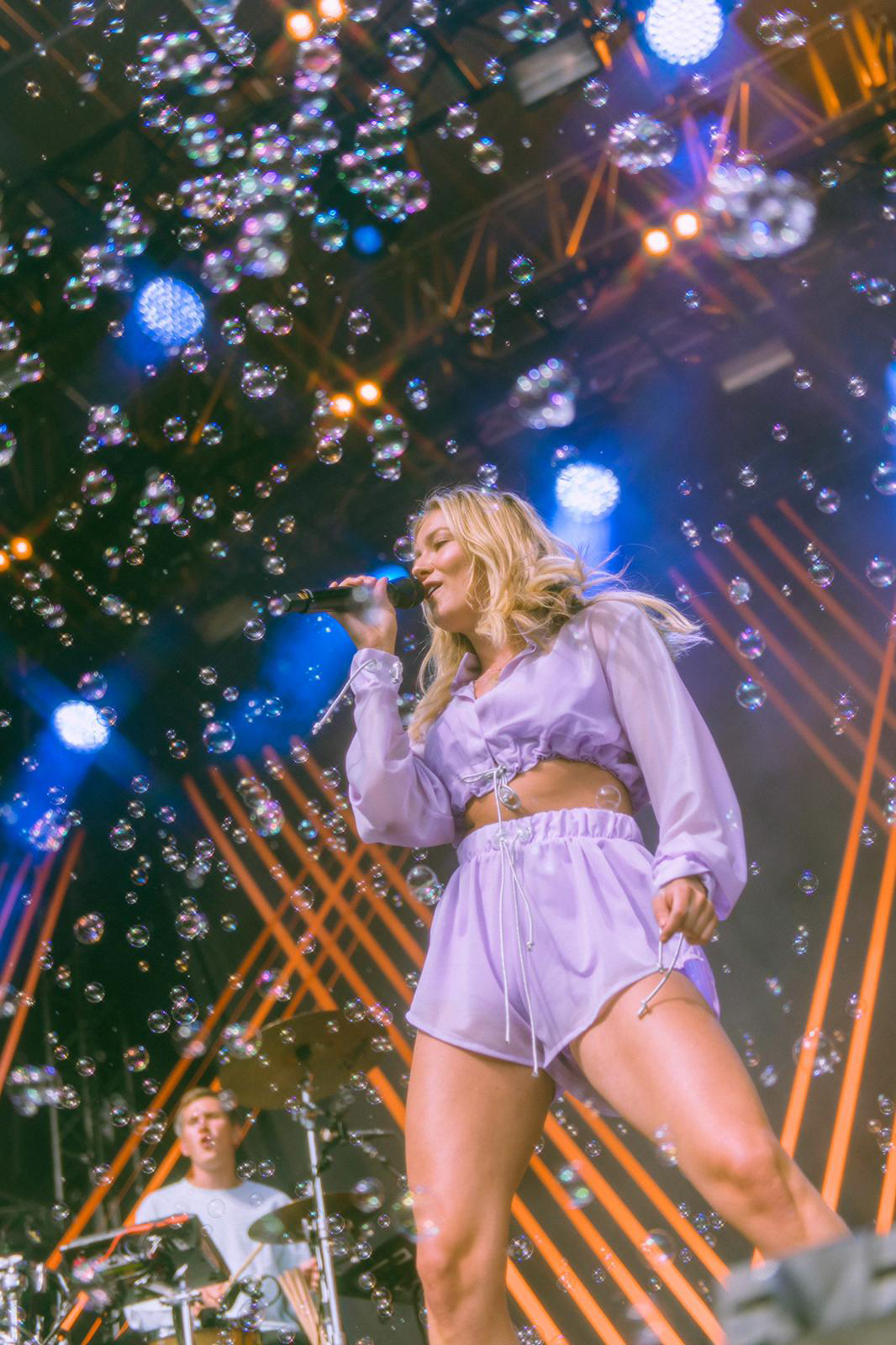
- Astrid S performing at Bergenfest in 2018
- Status: Active
- Genre: Music Festival
- Date: Mid June
- Frequency: Annually
- Location: Bergen
- Country: Norway
- Years active: 1993–present
- Capacity: 9,000
- Website: bergenfest.no

Bergenfest (initiated in 1993 under the name OleBlues) is an annual music festival held in the month of June, in Bergen, Norway, at the Bergenhus Fortress.

== History ==
It started out as an intimate blues and Americana festival, situated at various venues in the city center of Bergen.

Bergenfest has since then grown into what is now one of the leading music events in Norway, with a much more diverse music profile and a significantly bigger audience. In 2012, the festival changed to an outdoor event, and are now situated in the historically and aesthetically stimulating surroundings at Bergenhus Fortress.

== Notable performances ==
- (2011) - Alela Diane, Emmylou Harris, Imelda May, Jason Isbell
- (2012) - Ane Brun, Billy Talent, Ingrid Michaelson, Jonathan Wilson, Patti Smith, Turboneger
- (2013) - Amy Macdonald, Band of Horses, CC Cowboys, Imagine Dragons, Mark Knopfler, Nick Cave & The Bad Seeds, Susanne Sundfør
- (2014) - Agnes Obel, Blondie, Frank Turner, Highasakite, John Mayer, Lana Del Rey, Lars Vaular, Sivert Høyem
- (2015) - Aurora, Bastille, First Aid Kit, Patti Smith, Kygo, John Grant, Interpol
- (2016) - Biffy Clyro, Sigur Rós, Ghost, Wolf Alice, Lemaitre, Astrid S, Highasakite
- (2017) - Liam Gallagher, Hjerteslag, Ellie Goulding, Tom Odell, Kakkmaddafakka, Dagny, Sigrid, Zara Larsson, Pet Shop Boys, Aurora
- (2018) - Astrid S, Nick Cave & the bad Seeds, Queens of the Stone Age, Janove, Thåström, Sondre Justad, Sigrid, Whitney Rose
- (2019) - Bon Iver, Hjerteslag, Madrugada, Patti Smith, Tove Lo, Benjamin Ingrosso, John Grant, Tom Walker, Years & Years
- (2022) - A-ha, Passenger, Bernhoft, Aurora, Kvelertak, Emilie Nicolas, Zara Larsson, Röyksopp, Astrid S, Biffy Clyro, Erlend Øye
- (2023) - Veronica Maggio, Iggy Pop, First Aid Kit, Dean Lewis, Dagny, Lars Vaular, Sondre Justad
- (2024) - Kaizers Orchestra, Tom Odell, Fontaines D.C., Susanne Sundfør, PJ Harvey, Sivert Høyem
- (2025) - Aurora, Alanis Morissette, Roxette, The The, Lissie, Anavitória, Molly Sandén, John Olav Nilsen & Nordsjøen
