= 1972 in Nordic music =

The following is a list of notable events and releases that happened in Scandinavian music in 1972.

== Events ==
- 25 March – The Eurovision Song Contest is held in Scotland, and is won by Luxembourg for the second year in a row. Of the Scandinavian entries, Finland finish 12th, Sweden 13th and Norway 14th.
- 24 May – The 20th Bergen International Festival opens in Bergen, Norway, running until 7 June. Prominent musicians on the programme include Karsten Andersen and Magnar Mangersnes.
- 21 June – Hilding Rosenberg's Lento per orchestra d'archi, composed in 1956, receives its first public performance, at Bosjökloster, by the Malmö Chamber Orchestra.

== New works ==
- Per Nørgård – Gilgamesh (opera)
- Einojuhani Rautavaara – Cantus Arcticus, for orchestra

== Popular music ==
- Carl Bertil Agnestig – "Adventstid"
- Hljómsveit Ingimars Eydal – "Uppi við skógarásinn"
- Jukka Kuoppamäen – "Sininen ja valkoinen"
- Kim Larsen – "Fi-fi dong", recorded by Gasolin'
- John Mogensen – "Fut i fejemøget" (#1 Denmark, Sweden)
- Olsen Brothers – "Angelina" (#1 Denmark)
- Pugh Rogefeldt & Lasse Wellander – "Slavsång", recorded by Nature
- Bo Setterlind – "En sång om frihet", performed by Sven-Bertil Taube (#1 Sweden)

== Hit albums ==
- Ted Gärdestad – Undringar
- Gasolin' – Gasolin' 2

== Recordings ==
- Nicolai Gedda – Hector Berlioz, Benvenuto Cellini, with the Royal Opera Chorus, BBC Symphony Orchestra, and conductor Colin Davis (Philips)

== Eurovision Song Contest ==
- Finland in the Eurovision Song Contest 1972
- Norway in the Eurovision Song Contest 1972
- Sweden in the Eurovision Song Contest 1972

== Film and television music ==
- Bengst Ernryd & Georg Oddner – Nybyggarna
- Paroni Paakkunainen, Tapio Rautavaara & Ilpo Saastamoinen – Lampaansyöjät
- Charles Redland – Andersson's Kalle

== Musical films ==
- Bent Fabricius-Bjerre – Man sku være noget ved musikken

== Births ==
- 11 January – Anthony Lledo, Danish composer
- 4 July – Ketil Gutvik, Norwegian jazz guitarist
- 6 December – Sebastian Fagerlund, Finnish composer

== Deaths ==
- 4 January – Carl-Olof Anderberg, Swedish pianist, arranger and composer (born 1914)
- 5 March – Nils Björkander, Swedish composer (born 1893)
- 10 January – Sverre Jordan, Norwegian pianist, conductor and composer (born 1889)
- 12 August – Alf Hurum, Norwegian composer and painter (born 1882)
- 3 October – Kari Aarvold Glaser, Norwegian pianist and music teacher (born 1901)

== See also ==
- 1972 in Denmark
- 1972 in Iceland
- 1972 in Norwegian music
- 1972 in Sweden
