= Devil Doll =

Devil Doll may refer to:

- The Devil-Doll, a 1936 film
- Devil Doll (film), a 1964 film
- DevilDolls (film), a 2012 DVD
- Devil Doll (Slovenian band), an Italian-Slovenian experimental rock band
- Devil Doll (American band), rockabilly band fronted by Colleen Duffy, an American singer
- "Devil Doll", a song written by Sam Phillips and recorded by Roy Orbison on Roy Orbison at the Rock House
