= Kristi Brud =

Norwegian alternative rock band

- Origin: Bergen, Norway
- Genres: Alternative rock
- Years active: 2022–present
- Label: Sheep Chase Records
- Members: Petter Sætre; Nikolas Jon Aarland; Torjus Raknes; Ole André Hjelmås; Per Elling Kobberstad; Robert Jønnum
- Website: Official Facebook page

Kristi Brud is a Norwegian alternative rock band, formed in Bergen in 2022. The band was formed by former band members of the band Hjerteslag.

In November 2023, the band released their debut album Alt er nytt, which was well received by critics. The album won the 2023 Spellemann Award for "Best Rock" album.

In October 2025, their second studio album came out with the title Et fall.

== Band members ==
Members

- Petter Sætre – lead vocals, guitars (2022–present)
- Nikolas Jon Aarland – guitars, backing vocals (2022–present)
- Torjus Raknes – guitars, backing vocals (2022–present)
- Ole André Hjelmås – bass, backing vocals (2022–present)
- Per Elling Kobberstad – drums (2023–present)
- Robert Jønnum – synth (2023–present)

== Discography ==
Studio albums

- Alt er nytt (2023)
- Et fall (2025)
