= Vladimir Vavilov (composer) =

Russian composer

Vladimir Fyodorovich Vavilov (Russian: Влади́мир Фёдорович Вави́лов; 5 May 1925 – 11 March 1973) was a Russian Soviet guitarist, lutenist and composer. He was a student of Pyotr Isakov (guitar) and Johann Admoni (composition) at the Rimski-Korsakov Music College in Leningrad.

== Biography ==
Vavilov was active as a performer on both lute and guitar, as a music editor for a state music publishing house, and more importantly, as a composer. He routinely ascribed his own works to other composers, usually of the Renaissance or Baroque (occasionally from later eras), usually with total disregard of the appropriate style, in the spirit of other mystificators of the previous eras. His works achieved enormous circulation, and some of them achieved true folk-music status, with several poems set to his melodies.

Vavilov died aged 47, of pancreatic cancer, a few months before the appearance of "The City of Gold", which became a hit overnight.

The most famous of his anonymous or misattributed compositions are:

- "Canzona by Francesco da Milano", or, more precisely, Russian: Сюита для лютни: Канцона и Танец, lit. 'Suite for Lute: Canzona and Dance'. As Vavilov explained, he released this tule under the fake authorship on his vinyl disc titled Lute music of the 16th-17th centuries (which included real historical tunes), because he didn't expect that this kind of music by a little known composer published in the Soviet Union.
  Poets Anri Volokhonsky and Alexei Khvostenko would later set lyrics to this music, the song called "The City of Gold" song (in Russian "Город Золотой"). The song, in turn, would become a hit in the 1980s when it was performed by Boris Grebenshchikov and his band Aquarium for the soundtrack for the film Assa.
- "Mazurka by Andrey Sychra",
- "Elegy by Mikhail Vysotsky",
- "Russian Melody (tremolo study) by Mikhail Vysotsky",
- "Ricercar by Niccolo Nigrino",
- "Impromptu" by Miliy Balakirev.
- "Ave Maria". Vavilov wrote this aria with the ascription "Anonymous", and it was later mis-attributed to Giulio Caccini. It is often performed, notably by Inese Galante, Andrea Bocelli, Julian Lloyd Webber, Sumi Jo and Charlotte Church, inter alia.
- "Suite for the Lute: Pavane and Galliard". Poets Anri Volokhonsky and Alexei Khvostenko would later set lyrics on this music, the song called "Darling was carried away by a horse" (in Russian "Конь унес любимого").
