= Symphony in F =

Symphony in F can refer to:

- List of symphonies in F minor
- List of symphonies in F major

== See also ==
- List of symphonies by key
