= Ry Bradley =

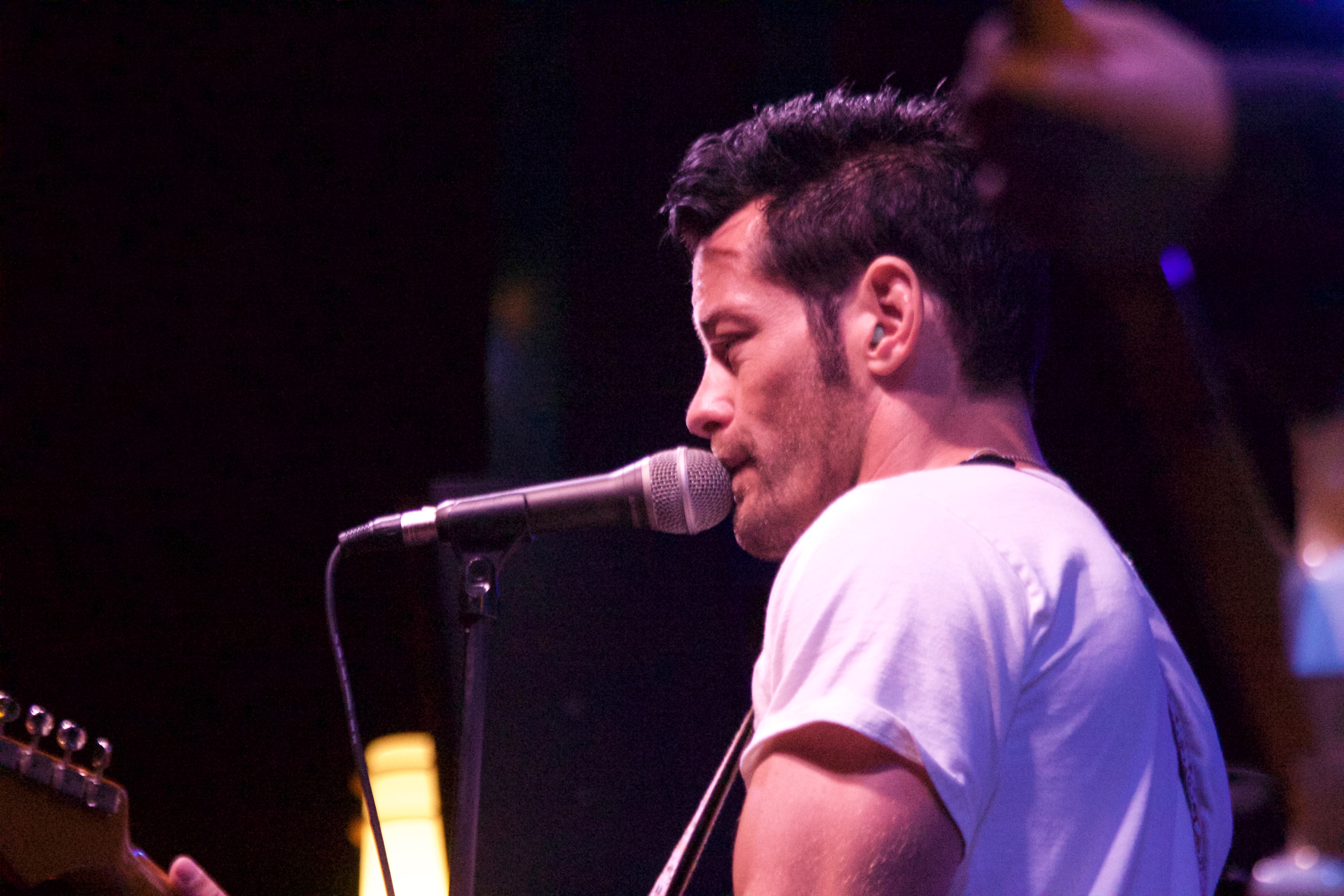
- Bradley performing in August 2016

Background information
- Born: Ryan Paul Bradley; August 18, 1980 (age 45)
- Genres: Country; rockabilly
- Occupations: Singer; songwriter; musician
- Instrument: Guitar
- Labels: Crimson Q; Sound Revolver
- Website: rybradley.com

Ryan Paul "Ry" Bradley (born August 18, 1980) is an American singer, songwriter, and musician.

== Early life ==
Ryan Paul Bradley was born on August 18, 1980. He was initially raised in Haleʻiwa, Hawaii, before moving with his family to Tustin, California. While in high school, he received scholarships to attend the University of California, Irvine, where he completed a bachelor's degree in Guitar Performance under the instruction of John Schneiderman.

== Career ==
From 2002 to 2006, Bradley was the lead singer and guitarist for Honolulu's first rockabilly band, Suspicious Minds. From 2008 to 2011, he was the lead guitarist for the rockabilly band Devil Doll in Los Angeles. In 2012, he signed a songwriting deal with publisher and radio personality Charlie Monk, which required him to relocate to Nashville.

In 2013, Bradley rose to prominence when his single "New Kind of Lonely" was featured on the SiriusXm radio show The Highway for three weeks. The song rose to No. 98 on the Mediabase record charts while being played on over 100 terrestrial radio stations across the U.S. Bradley was awarded "Country Artist of the Year" by the LA Music Awards in 2014, received a nomination for the same award in 2015 as well as nominations for "Best Video of the Year" for his single "Freedom Like This".

In February 2017, Bradley's song "Living for Right Now" was featured an episode of NBC's Chicago Med. His song "Still Got a Lot to Figure Out" has been featured in episodes of Queen America, Chicago Fire, and The Fosters. His most recent album, Everything I've Got, was released in July 2018. Later that year, MusicRow awarded his song "Hard Not to Feel" its DISCovery Award. In 2021, Bradley performed at the Edge of the World Concert in Nærøyfjord, a UNESCO World Heritage Site.

== Charity work ==
In 2004, Bradley collaborated with Hawaii Opera Theatre vocalists Julius Ahn, Andy Maddock, and Sherry Chock Wong to create Punk Rock Opera, a benefit concert for the youth empowerment organization Unity Crayons.

In 2018 and 2021, Bradley created and led Ry's Rock and Roll Camp, a teen music camp in Ringsaker Municipality, Norway.

In 2019, Bradley created the female-led Women Rock benefit concert for Casa Teresa, a home for pregnant women in crisis based in Orange, California.

== Discography ==
Year	Title	Notes	Chart performance
2012	Ry Bradley	Producer: Ry Bradley	Did not chart
2013	Freedom Like This (EP)	Producer: Ry Bradley and Ted Hewitt	No. 98 on Mediabase Chart
2018	Everything I've Got	Producer: Justin Busch and Ry Bradley	Did not chart
