= Vannmann86 =

Studio album by Hjerteslag
- Released: 18 November 2016
- Recorded: 2016
- Genre: Alternative rock
- Length: 39:55
- Label: Eget Selskap
- Producer: Anders Bjelland, Fredrik Vogsborg

Hjerteslag chronology
Møhlenpris motell (2015)	Vannmann86 (2016)	Nattseileren (2018)

Singles from Vannmann86
- 1. "Sang til Sonja"; 2. "Kong Oscars gate" 3. "En fiende krysser mine spor"

Professional ratings
Review scores
Source	Rating
Dagbladet	5/6 stars
Dagsavisen	5/6 stars
Gaffa	5/6 stars
NRK P3	5/6 stars

Vannmann86 is the second studio album by Hjerteslag. It was released on 18 November 2016. The album was nominated for the 2016 Spellemann Award for "Best Rock" album.

== Track listing ==
All lyrics are written by Robert Eidevik

Vannmann86 track listing
No.	Title	Music	Length
1.	"Crazy oktober" (Crazy October)	Robert Eidevik	3:51
2.	"Sang til Sonja" (Song for Sonja)	Eidevik	5:02
3.	"Kong Oscars gate" (King Oscar's Street)	Eidevik, Petter Sætre	4:56
4.	"Vestindia" (West Indies)	Eidevik	5:55
5.	"Bygningsarbeider blues" (Construction Worker Blues)	Eidevik	3:45
6.	"En fiende krysser mine spor" (An Enemy Crosses My Tracks)	Eidevik	4:53
7.	"Hellig krig" (Holy War)	Eidevik	4:15
8.	"Europa rundt" (Around Europe)	Eidevik	7:28

== Personnel ==
=== Hjerteslag ===
- Robert Eidevik – music, lyrics, vocals, guitars
- Petter Sætre – music on track 3, drums
- Ole Andre Hjelmås – bass
- Nikolas Jon Aarland – guitars
- Torjus Raknes – guitars

=== Technical ===
- Fredrik Vogsborg – producer, mixing
- Anders Bjelland – producer, mixing
- Iver Sandøy – mastering
- Odd Martin Skålnes – producer on track 6
