= Sergei Orekhov =

Russian musician (1935–1998)

Sergei Dmitrievich Orekhov (sometimes spelled: Sergey Dmitriyevich Orehov, (Russian: Сергей Дмитриевич Орехов; 1935–1998) was a Russian classical guitarist. A virtuoso on both the six- and seven-string guitars, Orekhov was among the most prominent performers and arrangers in the seven-string Russian guitar tradition.

== Recordings ==
- Гитара семиструнная — Seven-Stringed Guitar with Sergei Orekhov and Alexei Perfiliev (Алексей Перфильев); (1985, Мелодия С20 24391 00)

== Guitars used by Orekhov ==
Among the guitars used by Orekhov, one finds

- Johann Gottfried Scherzer 1861
  This guitar has a detachable neck. Its original neck has a configuration for 10 strings. Orekhov used a neck with the Russian 7-string configuration.
