= Alt er nytt =

Studio album by Kristi Brud
- Released: 17 November 2023
- Genre: Alternative rock
- Length: 46:02
- Label: Sheep Chase Records
- Producer: Robert Jønnum

Kristi Brud chronology
Alt er nytt (2023)	Et fall (2025)

Singles from Alt er nytt
- 1. "Spiller ingen rolle" 2. "Flammehav"; 3. "Dine foldede hender" 4. "Bare dråper"

Professional ratings
Review scores
Source	Rating
Musikknyheter	9/10

Alt er nytt is the debut studio album by Norwegian alternative rock band Kristi Brud. It was released on 17 November 2023.

The album won the 2023 Spellemann Award for "Best Rock" album.

== Track listing ==
All music and lyrics written by Kristi Brud.

Alt er nytt track listing
No.	Title	Length
1.	"Dine foldede hender" (Your Folded Hands)	3:19
2.	"Spiller ingen rolle" (Doesn't Matter)	5:33
3.	"Er du klar for å ha det gøy?" (Are You Ready To Have Fun?)	4:22
4.	"Kom an" (Come On)	4:26
5.	"En gang til" (One More Time)	4:54
6.	"Små liv" (Small Lives)	6:33
7.	"Paradis" (Paradise)	4:34
8.	"Flammehav" (Sea of Flame)	3:53
9.	"I tiden finnes vi et sted" (In Time We Exist Somewhere)	3:41
10.	"Bare dråper" (Just Drops)	4:42

== Personnel ==
=== Kristi Brud ===
- Petter Sætre – lead vocals, guitars
- Nikolas Jon Aarland – guitars, backing vocals
- Torjus Raknes – guitars, backing vocals
- Ole André Hjelmås – bass, backing vocals
- Per Elling Kobberstad – drums
- Robert Jønnum – synth

=== Technical ===
- Robert Jønnum – producer, mixing
- Matias Tellez – mastering

=== Artwork ===
- Sondre Krum Dahl – photography
