= Nattseileren =

Studio album by Hjerteslag
- Released: 9 November 2018
- Genre: Alternative rock
- Length: 40:52
- Label: Eget Selskap
- Producer: Anders Bjelland, Fredrik Vogsborg

Hjerteslag chronology
Vannmann86 (2016)	Nattseileren (2018)	Tyvens dagbok (2022)

Singles from Nattseileren
- 1. "Skyggesiden"; 2. "Nordavind"; 3. "Nattseileren"; 4. "Det Raymond sa"

Professional ratings
Review scores
Source	Rating
Aftenposten	5/6 stars
Dagsavisen	5/6 stars

Nattseileren is the third studio album by Hjerteslag. It was released on 9 November 2018.

== Track listing ==
All tracks are written by Robert Eidevik

Nattseileren track listing
No.	Title	Length
1.	"Nattseileren" (The Night Sailor)	3:45
2.	"Det Raymond sa" (What Raymond Said)	5:09
3.	"Sang 31" (Song 31)	3:39
4.	"Nordavind" (North Wind)	4:24
5.	"Farvel til musikken" (Farewell to the Music)	3:55
6.	"Bergensk rulett" (Bergensk Roulette)	3:57
7.	"Byen er ond" (The City is Evil)	3:52
8.	"Skyggesiden" (The Shadow Side)	4:40
9.	"Siste reis" (Last Journey)	7:28

== Personnel ==
=== Hjerteslag ===
- Robert Eidevik – music, lyrics, vocals, guitars
- Petter Sætre – drums
- Ole Andre Hjelmås – bass
- Nikolas Jon Aarland – guitars
- Torjus Raknes – guitars

=== Additional musicians ===
- Matias Monsen – cello on track 5, 10
- Fredrik Vogsborg – percussion, synth

=== Technical ===
- Fredrik Vogsborg – producer, mixing
- Anders Bjelland – producer, mixing
- Hugo Alvarstein – mastering
