= John Schneiderman =

American lutenist and guitarist

John H. Schneiderman is an American lutenist and guitarist born in Ithaca, New York, where his father was a member of the faculty of Cornell University. Schneiderman was introduced to music by his mother, who taught him to play the ukulele when he was six years old. He began performing at the age of nine, playing the banjo and fiddle at bluegrass festivals in California. Schneiderman received his undergraduate degree at the University of California, Irvine, studying guitar under Frederick Noad. He continued his studies at the Schola Cantorum in Basel, Switzerland with lutenist Eugen Müller-Dombois.

Schneiderman specializes in the performance practice and repertoire of 18th century lutes and 19th century guitars. His discography includes works by lutenists Sylvius Leopold Weiss, Bernhard Joachim Hagen, Karl Kohaut and Adam Falckenhagen and guitarists Napoléon Coste and Johann Kaspar Mertz.

Schneiderman is currently the director of guitar and lute studies at the University of California, Irvine, and nearby Irvine Valley College, and he has been on the faculties of Orange Coast College, California State University, Long Beach, and the San Francisco Conservatory of Music. Schneiderman has had many notable students while on faculty at the University of California, Irvine. Classical Guitarists Gregory Coleman and Dr. Jon Minei as well as country singer Ry Bradley have all been former students of Schneiderman.

== Collaborations ==
Schneiderman has a longstanding collaboration with Oleg Timofeyev in "Tsar's Guitars", a duo of Russian 7-string guitars. He also participated on baroque lute in the radio productions of music by the contemporary lutenist composer Roman Turovsky.
