= 1961 in Norwegian music =

The following is a list of notable events and releases of the year 1961 in Norwegian music.

== Events ==
=== May ===
- The 9th Bergen International Festival started in Bergen, Norway.

=== July ===
- The 1st Moldejazz started in Molde, Norway.

== Deaths ==
February

- 19 – Einar Fagstad, accordionist, singer, actor and composer (born 1899).

August

- 28 – Carsten Carlsen, pianist and composer (born 1892).

== Births ==
January

- 7 – Nils Økland, Hardanger fiddle player.
- 13 – Sinikka Langeland, traditional folk singer and kantele player.
- 16 – Kenneth Sivertsen, jazz guitarist, composer, poet, and comedian (died 2006).

February

- 12 – Knut Reiersrud, jazz and blues guitarist, composer, and program host.

March

- 2 – Harald Dahlstrøm, jazz pianist and Hammond B3 organist.
- 23 – Eivind Aarset, jazz guitarist and composer.

April

- 25
  - Paul Wagnberg, jazz organist, pianist, and composer.
  - Truls Mørk, classical cellist.
- 26 – Knut Nesbø, guitarist for Di Derre (died 2013).

May

- 29 – Glenn Erik Haugland, contemporary composer.

June

- 22 – Asbjørn Schaathun, contemporary composer.

July

- 8 – Karl Seglem, jazz saxophonist, bukkehorn player, composer, and record producer.

September

- 6 – Paul Waaktaar-Savoy, musician and songwriter for A-ha and Savoy.

October

- 14 – Knut Vaage, contemporary composer.
- 20 – Audun Kleive, jazz drummer and percussionist.

December

- 13 – Per Øystein Sørensen, singer and songwriter for Fra Lippo Lippi.
- 30 – Rolf Lislevand, performer of Early music specialising on lute, vihuela, baroque guitar and theorbo.

== See also ==
- 1961 in Norway
- Music of Norway
