= Andrei Sychra =

Russian composer

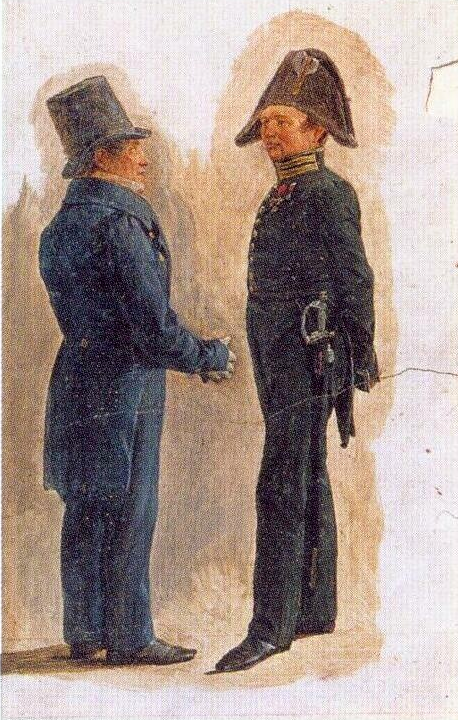
G.Cherencov study - Sikhra and Aksenov

Andrei Osipovich Sychra (also written as Sikhra or Sichra; Russian: Андрей Осипович Сихра Andrej Osipovič Sixra; 1773 or 1776 – 21 November or 3 December 1850) was a Russian guitarist, composer and teacher of Czech ancestry. Sychra holds a prominent position within Russia, where he is often referred to as the patriarch of the seven-string guitar, and also as its inventor, disputed though that may be. He was a major force in the development of Russian guitar music and one of its most prolific composers, as well as an important teacher who trained a number of students.

== Life and career ==
Sychra was born in 1773 or 1776 in Vilnius. He initially played the harp and possibly the torban on which he was reputed to have been a great virtuoso, before dedicating himself to the seven-string guitar. He moved to Moscow early in 1801, and became the dominant figure in the field, gaining a huge following. In 1812, perhaps because of Napoleon's campaign and the Moscow fire of that year, he moved to Saint Petersburg, where he remained for the rest of his life. In 1802 Sychra published the Journal pour la guitare à sept cordes in Moscow, and in 1813 published a new journal, Sobranie raznogo roda p'es [A collection of various pieces] in Saint Petersburg. He published another journal in 1818, advertised in the Peterburgskie vedemosti [Petersburg news] as containing 50 pieces in each of its six issues. A further journal appeared in 1824. The most important of his journals, Peterburgskij žurnal dlja gitary [The Petersburg journal for the guitar], first appeared in 1826, and was published, presumably monthly, for the next 12 years; 144 issues survive. He also published many individual pieces. The Stellovsky-Gutheil editions alone contain 75 numbers, of which most consist of several compositions. In all Sychra published more than 1,000 pieces for the seven-string guitar, and left many in manuscript, including complete arrangements for two guitars of Glinka’s A Life for the Tsar and Ruslan and Lyudmila, with which he was assisted by the composer.

Sychra wrote a large number of pieces for amateurs, including studies, folk song settings, operatic transcriptions and arrangements of Viennese waltzes by Johann Strauss, Carl Maria von Weber and Josef Lanner, an output that may explain his dismissal by Soviet-era musicologists as a mediocre composer. Among these compositions, however, are many that require the highest level of virtuoso technique, and which not only employ techniques not known in the West, such as the four-finger cross-string trill, but are also musically innovative. Much of Sychra's guitar music, especially the teaching pieces and studies, reproduces harp sonorities on the guitar, perhaps as a result of his early career as a harpist. His magnum opus, the Praktičeskie pravila igrat' na gitare [Practical rules for playing the guitar] (Saint Petersburg, 1817), which has long been esteemed by Russian guitarists, is only now beginning to attract international attention.

Interest in Sychra's composition and guitar technique has received renewed attention following the revival of his work by Dr. Oleg Timofeyev, whose doctoral dissertation (Timofeyev 1999a) and subsequent recordings (e.g., (Timofeyev 1999b), (Timofeyev 2000)) have been devoted to Sychra.

Sychra died on 21 November or 3 December 1850 in Saint Petersburg.

== See also ==
- List of Russian composers
