= Oleg Timofeyev =

American musicologist (born 1963)

Oleg V. Timofeyev
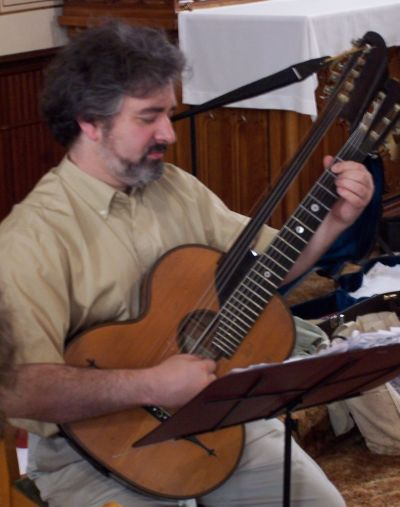
- Oleg Timofeyev, IARGUS 2007, Iowa City

Background information
- Born: 12 January 1963 (age 63); Moscow
- Genres: Classical music
- Occupations: Guitarist, lutenist and musicologist.
- Instruments: guitar, lute
- Labels: Centaur, Dorian, Hänssler Classic, Naxos
- Website: www.russian-guitar.com

Oleg Vitalyevich Timofeyev (Russian: Оле́г Вита́льевич Тимофе́ев, Oleg Vital'evič Timofeev; born January 12, 1963, in Moscow), is an American musicologist, specializing in lute and Russian guitar. He is best known for his pioneering work in the discovery, promotion, interpretation, and authentic performance of the repertoire for the 19th- and 20th-century Russian seven-string guitar.

== Biography ==
Timofeyev born into a musical family. His mother Natalia Timofeyeva, a cellist, is Jewish. His father was a Roma.

=== Studies ===
Timofeyev began his study of the classical guitar in the early 1980s under the tutelage of Swiss-Russian guitarist Kamill Frauchi, about whom he later produced a documentary film titled Frautschi. He holds an M.A. in Early Music Performance from the University of Southern California (1993), and a Ph.D. in Performance Practice from Duke University (1999). Since 1983 he has been performing early music on authentic instruments of the plucked family (lute, guitar). In 1989 his musical interests brought him to the U.S., where he studied with Patrick O'Brien, James Tyler, and Hopkinson Smith.

=== Professional work ===
==== Revival of the Russian seven-string guitar ====
Since earning his doctorate he has worked for the revival of Russian music played with authentic technique on the seven-string guitar, often in collaboration with other artists, including the Russian Roma guitarist Sasha Kolpakov, the Kolpakov Trio (Timofeyev, Kolpakov Trio and Talisman 2005), and the American guitarist John Schneiderman (Timofeyev and Schneiderman 2006). Among the fruits of his research has been his rediscovery and recording the music of Matvej Pavlov-Azancheev (1888–1963), who was among the rare composers for the seven-string guitar in the first half of the twentieth century.

Timofeyev has performed and taught widely in Europe and the United States. A recipient of numerous scholarly awards, including IREX and Fulbright fellowships, he has taught and lectured at Maimonides State Academy (Moscow), Duke University, the University of Kansas, Northwestern University, Princeton University, the University of Iowa, Grinnell College, and the Smithsonian.

== Bibliography ==
=== Scholarly publications ===
- Timofeyev, Oleg (1996). "Francesco and Matelart in a Moscow Music Shop". Lute Society Quarterly. 30 (4): 16–23.
- Timofeyev, Oleg (1998a). "Marco Bazzotti. La Chitarra Eptacorde Nella Cultura Russa dell'Ottocento". Il Fronimo. 103: 27–40.
- Timofeyev, Oleg (1998b). "Thomas Ford. Lyra Viol Duets. Critical edition with a scholarly introduction and commentary" (Document). Madison: A-R Editions.
- Timofeyev, Oleg (2023). The Seven-String Guitar in Russia: Its Origins, Repertoire, and Performance Practice, 1800-1850. Cambridge: Cambridge Scholars Publishing. ISBN 978-1-5275-9285-8.

=== Film- and discography ===
- Timofeyev, Oleg (1997). The Wandering Lutenist (CD). Centaur Records. CRC-2409.
- Timofeyev, Oleg (1999). The Golden Age of the Russian Guitar (CD). Dorian Recordings. DOR-93170.
- Timofeyev, Oleg (2000). The Golden Age of Russian Guitar, Vol. 2 (CD). Dorian Recordings. DOR-93203.
- Timofeyev, Oleg (Russian Seven-String Guitar, Artistic Director); Anne Harley (Soprano, Co-Director); Irina Rees (Harpsichord); Etienne Abelin (Baroque Violin) (2002). Music of Russian Princesses From the Court of Catherine the Great (CD). Dorian Recordings. DOR-93244.
- Timofeyev, Oleg (2004). Guitar in the GULag: Guitar Music by Matvei Pavlov-Azancheev, 1888–1963 (CD). Hänssler Records. 098458000.
- Timofeyev, Oleg, Kolpakov Trio & Talisman (2005). A Tribute to Stesha: Early Music of Russian Gypsies (CD). Naxos World Music. 76065-2.
- Timofeyev, Oleg & John Schneiderman (2006). Music Of Mikhail Glinka / The Czar's Guitars (CD). Profil – Edition Günter Hänssler. PH-07008.
- Timofeyev, Oleg (guitar), Natalia Timofeyeva (cello), Robert Paredes (clarinet), Matthew Burrier (accordion) & Daniel Moore (percussion) (2007). Rhapsody Judaica (CD). Marquis Music. MAR-349.
- Timofeyev, Oleg (2007). Shavlego: Guitar Music by Georgian Composers (CD). Profil – Edition Günter Hänssler. PH-07072.
