= Betonglandskap =

Studio album by Hjerteslag
- Released: 23 February 2024
- Recorded: 2023
- Genre: Alternative rock
- Length: 39:40
- Label: Fysisk Format
- Producer: Herbrand Larsen, Arve Isdal

Hjerteslag chronology
Tyvens dagbok (2022)	Betonglandskap (2024)

Singles from Betonglandskap
- 1. "Bomerang"; 2. "Krystallpalasset"; 3. "Bipolar"

Professional ratings
Review scores
Source	Rating
Aftenbladet	4/6 stars
Gaffa	3/6 stars
Morgenbladet	6/6 stars

Betonglandskap (Norwegian for Concrete landscape) is the fifth studio album by Hjerteslag. It was released on 23 February 2024.

== Track listing ==
All tracks are written by Robert Eidevik.

Betonglandskap track listing
No.	Title	Length
1.	"Ond sirkel" (Vicious Circle)	3:49
2.	"Bipolar"	5:09
3.	"Idiot som meg" (Idiot Like Me)	3:43
4.	"Kartong city" (Cardboard City)	5:09
5.	"Krystallpalasset" (The Crystal Palace)	3:28
6.	"Om medisinen virker" (If the Medicine Works)	4:02
7.	"Bomerang" (Boomerang)	4:25
8.	"Glasskår" (Shards of Glass)	4:33
9.	"Glødende kull" (Glowing Coals)	3:26
10.	"Blitzregn vol 2" (Blitzrain vol 2)	1:53

== Personnel ==
=== Hjerteslag ===
- Robert Eidevik – music, lyrics, vocals, guitars
- Arve Isdal – guitars
- Yngve Andersen – bass
- Herbrand Larsen – keyboards, guitars
- Ivar Thormodsæther – drums

=== Additional musicians ===
- Matias Monsen – cello
- Marius Mørch – guitars

=== Technical ===
- Herbrand Larsen – producer
- Arve Isdal – producer
- Anders Bjelland – mixing
- Morgan Nicolaysen – mastering
