= Devil Doll (American band) =

American rockabilly band

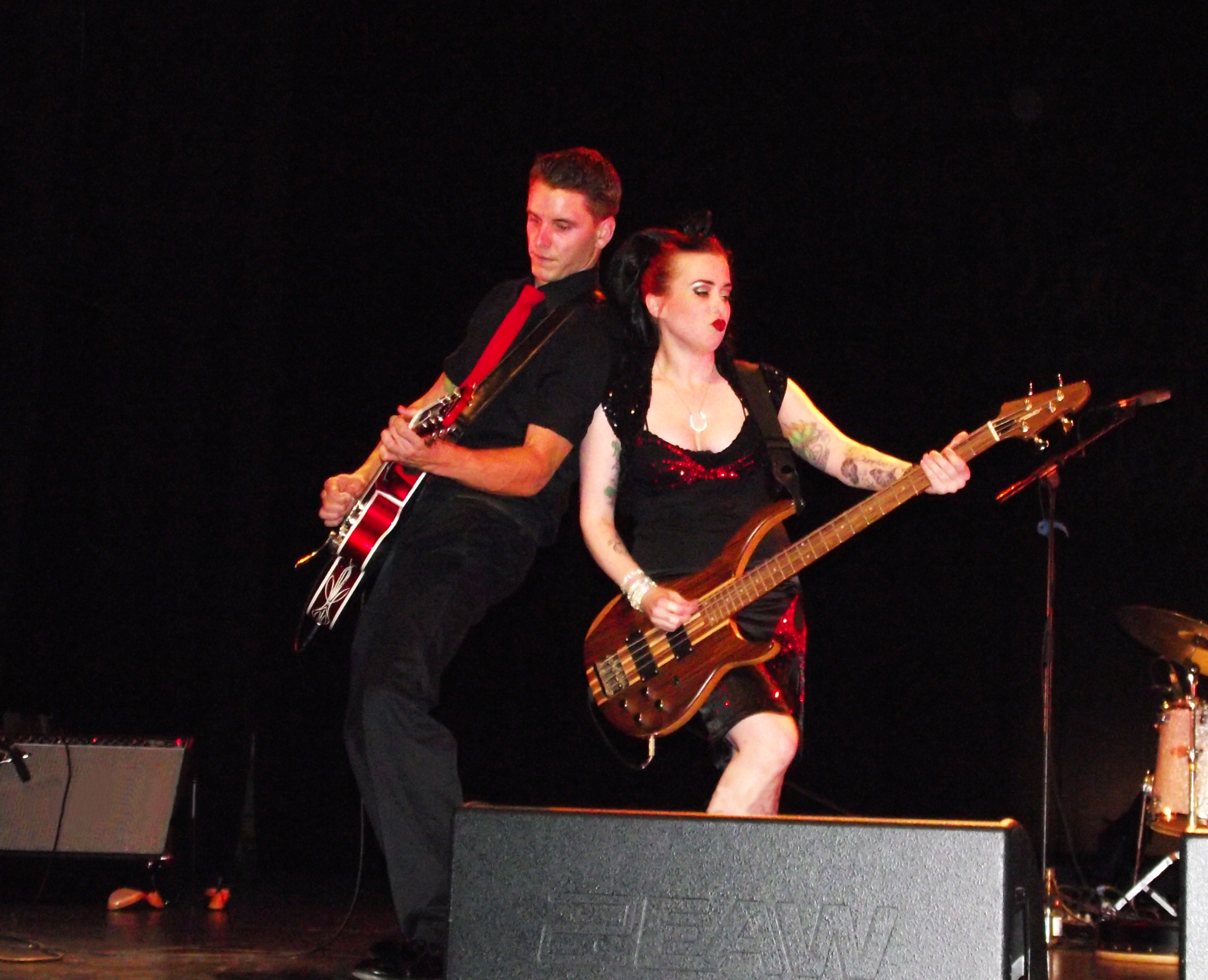
Devil Doll in 2011

Devil Doll is an American rockabilly band fronted by singer Colleen Duffy. Their song "Faith in Love", from the 2003 album Queen of Pain, was featured on Buffy the Vampire Slayer.

Devil Doll has had many musicians in their live band, including Mother Superior drummer Matt Tecu, and guitarist Ry Bradley.

In January 2018, after 4 years of hiatus due to Duffy's illness, Duffy announced a crowdfunding campaign to help finance a new album.

== Discography ==
=== Queen of Pain (2002) ===
No.	Title	Length
1	"St. Christopher"	2:52
2	"You Are the Best Thing and the Worst Thing"	3:38
3	"Heart Sized Crush"	3:13
4	"It Was Raining"	3:00
5	"King of Brooklyn"	4:47
6	"16 Days"	2:10
7	"Walk With Me"	4:20
8	"Things You Make Me Do"	5:52
9	"Faith in Love"	4:49
10	"Bourbon in Your Eyes"	4:51
11	"Driven to Distraction"	3:18
12	"Liquor Store"	3:19
13	"Queen of Pain"	5:05
14	"You Put a Spell On Me"	3:36
15	"Union Square"	3:24
16	"Left"	3:32
17	"Why"	3:29
18	"If I Died in Your Arms"	7:27

=== The Return of Eve (2007) ===
No.	Title	Length
1	"The One Who Got Away"	3:26
2	"Doreen"	3:35
3	"Gypsy Bitch"	4:40
4	"Man in Black"	2:23
5	"St. Patrick"	2:59
6	"Sweet Lorraine"	4:11
7	"The Curse"	2:34
8	"Tortured"	4:10
9	"The Way You Do"	4:51
10	"Lord's Prayer"	3:46
11	"Sexy"	3:43
12	"Queen of the Road"	2:50
13	"Heads or Tails"	5:41
14	"Fever"	3:51

=== Lover & a Fighter (2020) ===
No.	Title	Length
1	"You Can't Have Me"	5:04
2	"Forsaken"	4:29
3	"One Night Stand"	4:32
4	"Lover & a Fighter"	3:43
5	"To All Our Friends"	4:30
6	"Save Me a Seat"	4:55
7	"Back Home to Me"	4:00
8	"Steeltown Heart"	3:59
9	"Mother Mary"	5:40
10	"Ballad of the Rearview Mirror" (with Charlie Overbey)	4:58
11	"It's Only Make Believe"	2:29
12	"Purse Whiskey"	4:01
13	"Simple Man"	7:12
