= Riikka Hakola =

Finnish opera singer (1962–2024)

Riikka Johanna Hakola (7 December 1962 – 5 February 2024) was a Finnish operatic soprano from Seinäjoki. She was a Master of Music by education.

Riikka Hakola studied singing at the Sibelius Academy and privately in London, New York, Milan and Vienna. She won the Kangasniemi Singing Competition in 1987 and won second prize in the Timo Mustakallio Singing Competition the same year. Hakola was a guest soloist at the Finnish National Opera from 1990; She also performed at the Bolshoi Theatre in Moscow and in several opera houses in the Nordic countries, Germany and the United States.

Among Hakola's more than 40 roles are Violetta (La Traviata), Donna Anna (from Don Giovanni), Fiordiligi (Così fan tutte), Lucia di Lammermoor, Micaëla (Carmen), Arabella, Anna Bolena, Rosina (The Barber of Seville) and Gilda (Rigoletto).

Hakola also premiered Finnish compositions and participated in TV operas. She performed as a soloist with orchestras in more than 20 countries.

Hakola died on 5 February 2024, at the age of 61.
