= Adventstid =

Swedish Advent song

- Hymn
- English: Time of Advent
- Occasion: Advent
- Written: 1972
- Text: by Carl Bertil Agnestig
- Language: Swedish
- Melody: by Carl Bertil Agnestig
- Published: 1997

Adventstid, or Adventstid kom till mitt ensamma hus, is a Swedish language 1972 Advent song, with lyrics and music by Carl Bertil Agnestig. The song has often been performed in Kindergarten and at school in Sweden during Advent.

== Publication ==
- Julens önskesångbok, 1997, under the lines "Advent".
- Barnens svenska sångbok, 1999, under the lines "Året runt".

== Recordings ==
An early recording was done by Kattarp-Välinge barnkör, and the record was released in 1979.
