= Karl Kohaut =

Karl Ignaz Augustin Kohaut (baptised August 26, 1726 – August 6, 1784) was an Austrian diplomat, lutenist and composer of Czech descent. He is considered (along with Bernhard Joachim Hagen) to be one of the last important composers of music for Baroque lute.

== Career ==
He was born in Vienna to Jakob Kohaut, musician to Prince Adam von Schwarzenberg. He entered civil service in 1756 or 1757. He accompanied Joseph II to his coronation in Frankfurt in 1764. In the same year he also accompanied Count Kaunitz to Paris. By 1778, he had become court secretary.

In 1761, he published his first work, a divertimento for lute, two violins and basso continuo, in Leipzig. It is his only published work. He dedicated two cantatas to celebrate Emperor Joseph's (at that time an Archduke of Austria) visit to the Melk Abbey. He played the violin in Gottfried van Swieten's Sunday concerts, in which Haydn's and Mozart's works were played.

He died in Vienna on August 6, 1784, unmarried. The manuscripts of his first concerto and some of his trio sonatas came to the possession of the Belgian musicologist François-Joseph Fétis.

His lute divertimento and five lute concertos have been recorded by John Schneiderman.
