= Glenn Erik Haugland =

Norwegian contemporary composer (born 1961)

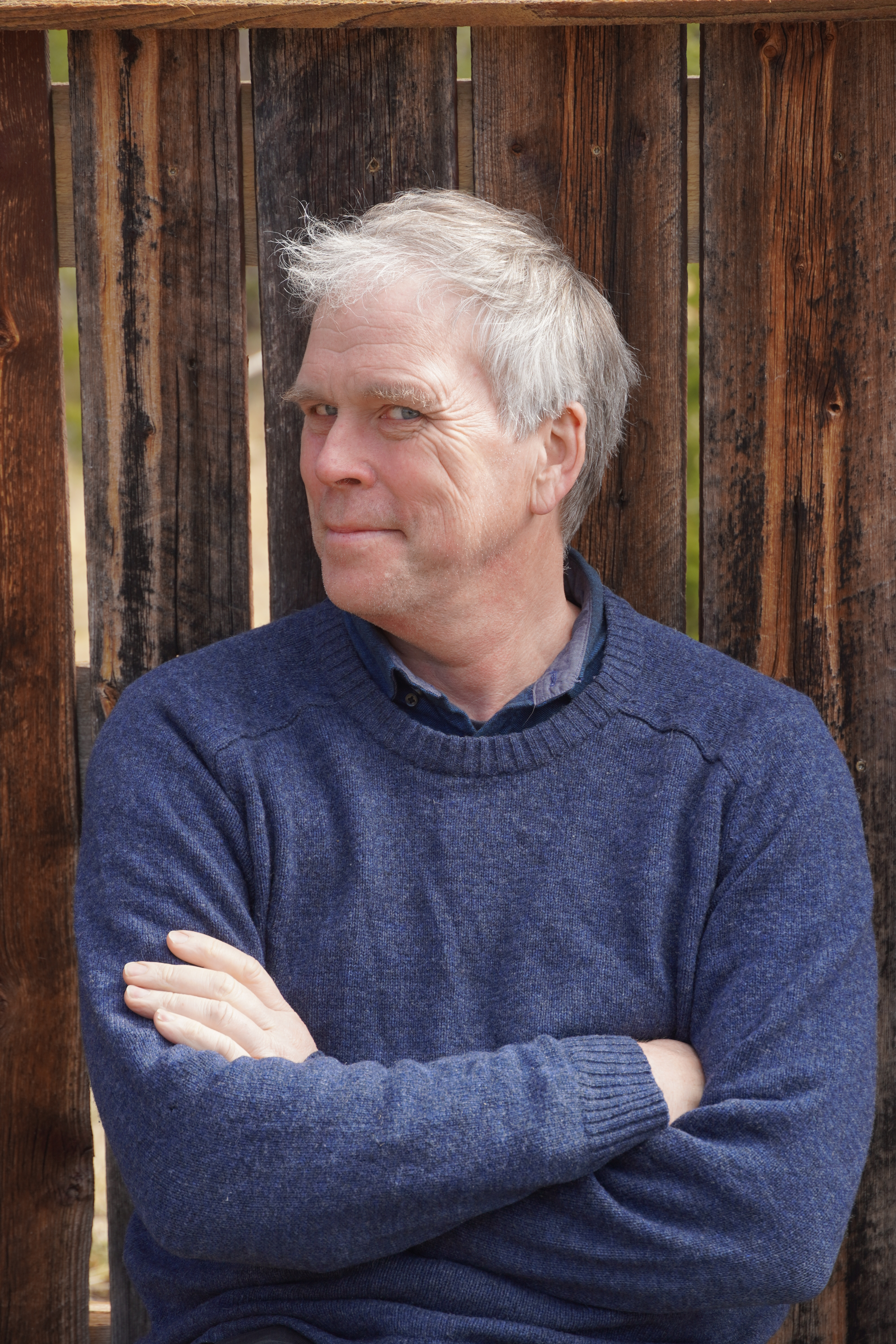
Glenn Erik Haugland

Glenn Erik Haugland (born 29 May 1961, in New York City) is a Norwegian contemporary composer.

== Career ==
Throughout his career, Haugland has primarily focused on works for music theatre and electro-acoustic compositions. Experimentation through performance art, music drama and music theatre for children have also been key components of Haugland’s compositional output.

Haugland’s list of works encompasses more than 100 works, including ten operas. In partnership with Heidi Tronsmo and Ståle Tråsdahl, Haugland founded the music theatre ensemble Opera Omnia in 1990. Following more than 30 music theatre productions, Opera Omnia premiered operas PoY! and Hulda og Garborg in 2000/2001. The children’s opera PoY! has seen more than 130 performances throughout Europe, while his chamber opera Hulda og Garborg has been performed a number of times domestically.

Haugland has composed commissioned works for ensembles and orchestras including the Bergen Philharmonic Orchestra, Bergen Domkantori, Raschér Saxofon Quartet, SISU, Den Nationale Scene and Agder Theatre.

2004 saw Haugland being nominated for the Nordic Council Music Prize for his chamber opera Hulda og Garborg. In 2007, Haugland was bestowed with the Fartein Valen scholarship. Haugland has also written major orchestral works over the last decade, including 2007’s Rebekka premiered at the Norwegian National Opera and Ballet. Other key Haugland works include sound installations Grøne Sjøar og Blått blod, Byen and the music theatre work Gospel of Judas.

Haugland served as the chairman of the Norwegian Society of Composers from 1997 to 2002.

== Production ==
=== Selected works ===
- Overstrøms, For 2 Pianos, String Quartet and soprano (2016)
- Gospel of Judas (2013)
- Brytestad (2011)
- ...og holt læt seld sjels gal (2008)
- Black cello – Solo cello (2007)
- Rebekka * –opera (2007)
- Law vs Order – 4 fragments for sax and marching band (2007)
- Som En Sang – opera (2006)
- Ein hage der inne – chamber opera for 6 vocalists, 2 percussionists, dancers and electronics (2006)
- Du måtte nesten rope det choir and saxophone quartet (2006)
- Hverken offer eller bøddel (2005)
- En Som Sang (2004)
- Hauge-sanger -vocals, trumpet, violin (2003)
- Springflo – orchestral work (2003)
- Da un’altra verita – Soprano and strings (2003)
- Sigyn synger! – violin solo (2002)
- Heldigvis har me Musikken marching band (2002)
- Homage a Kristian Ø – flute or soprano sax solo (2002)
- Paramelodiparaden – sax quartet (2002)
- Hulda & Garborg – chamber opera (2001)
- Timecarving (2000)
- Aldri si Aldri (2000)
- Blikket – choir (1999)
- Da tankene fikk vinger... violin, soloists and strings (1999)
- Svart (1997)
- I Tried to Strangle Harald Sæverud (1997)
- Veras Ville Verden (1996)
- The Ghosts in My Life (1995)
- Skrap for barn (1995)
- We're Lying – 4 Desperately Rewriting an Incident (1995)
- Hannah : Timen nærmer seg (1994)
- The Primitive. The Poison. The Storm (1994)
- Om desse steinane tala – vocals, violin, guitar, accordion, double bass (1990/1993)
- Brev – voice and tape (1989)
- Opera fl. av opus (1989)
- Denne vesle jenta : Basert på ein folketone frå Nordfjord (1988)
- Trolltonespill – En konsertforestilling for barn (1988)
- Ein fjord trio (1988) voice, piano, double bass (1988)
- I det vi nærmer oss Sinfonietta (1988)
- Den som bygger på stein : Basert på en rundvals fra Østerdal orchestra (1988)
- So ro rull Ein reise-rondo for barn voice and horn (1987)
- Hulderkall – choir and electronics (1987)
- TV-spill 1 – violin solo (1986)
- Sex og vold two pianos and electronics (1985)
- L'hymne se nomme -Soprano, 2 recorder, 2 guitars, viola, cello, cembalo (1984)
- Barefooted Among Burning Feet – Sinfonietta (1982), orchestra (1983)
- Doubt ... less – flute and guitar (1982)
- Accompanied Crowd violin, cello, piano (1981)
- I stykker sax quartet (1980/82)

=== Discography ===
- 3x3 - En fuglefabel (Opera Omni Records) (2007)
- En Som Sang (Opera Omnia Records) (2007)
- PoY! (Opera Omnia Records) (2007)
- Du måtte nesten rope det (Bergen Digital) (2007)
- Aldri før (Gneis) (2007)
- Avgarde (Hemera) (2000)
- Ghosts (Hemera) (1996)
- Norwegian Signatures (Aurora) (1995)
- Om desse steinane tala (Hemera) (1994)
