= Carl Bertil Agnestig =

Swedish music teacher and composer (1924–2019)

- Born: Carl Bertil Andersson; 7 March 1924; Järvsö, Sweden
- Died: 14 July 2019 (aged 95)
- Genres: Christian hymns
- Occupation(s): music teacher, composer

Carl Bertil Agnestig (né Andersson; 7 March 1924 – 14 July 2019) was a Swedish music teacher and composer.

He was son to engineer Anders Ruben (Andersson) Agnestig (1897–1982) and Karin, née Grahn (1904–1990). The family came to Byarums parish in Småland in 1928, and finally settled in Nacka in 1930.

Agnestig graduated Master in Education in Music from the Royal College of Music in 1946. He became music teacher at Uppsala's music school in 1947, at Nacka music school 1948, director of studies 1959, and temporary principal in 1966. He was union secretary at the Swedish Association of Municipal Music Instructors (RSM) in 1959, member of the cooperation committee for the music educator association from 1962 and of the Swedish Teachers' Union council in 1966.

He is known for music-instruction books and has written several songs, one of the more well-known is Adventstid. He's represented in Den svenska psalmboken (1986) with two works.

Carl-Bertil Agnestig was married for a time with Alfhild Kerstin Linnéa Burman (1920–2010) before he married Agneta Åkerfeldt (born 1932). Agnestig has two sons.
