= 1892 in Norwegian music =

The following is a list of notable events and releases of the year 1892 in Norwegian music.

== Births ==
June

- 5 – Carsten Carlsen, pianist and composer (died 1961).

== See also ==
- 1892 in Norway
- Music of Norway
