= Mikhail Vysotsky =

Russian composer and guitar player

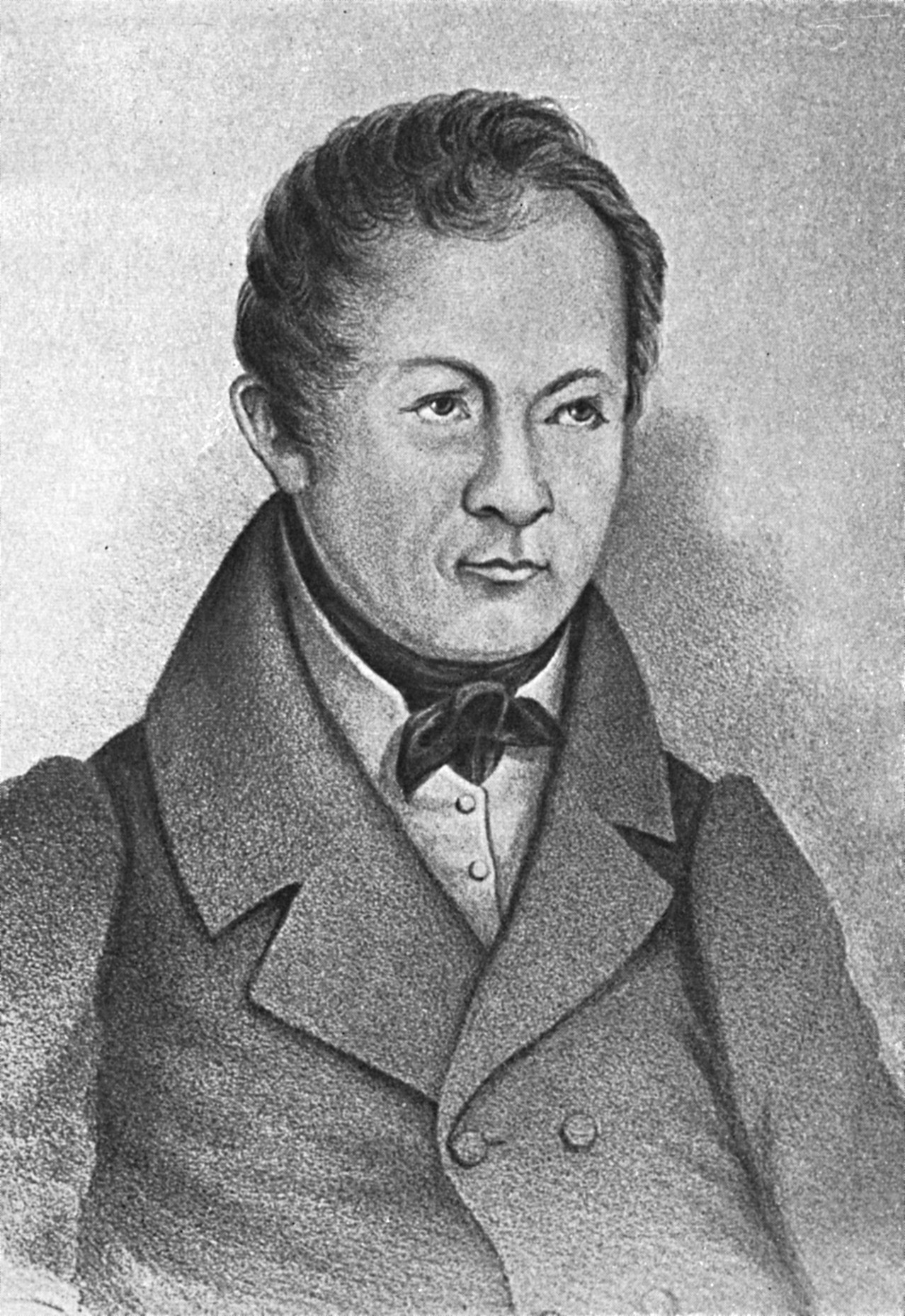
Mikhail Vysotsky, by an anonymous author

Mikhail Timofeyevich Vysotsky (Russian: Михаил Тимофеевич Высотский; 1791 – 28 December 1837) was a Russian composer, notable for his pieces for guitar.

Vysotsky was born in 1791 in the village of Ochakovo (currently part of Ochakovo-Matveyevskoye District in Moscow), at the estate of the author Mikhail Kheraskov. He was a serf of Kheraskov, as were his parents, however, Kheraskov was also his godfather. Vysotsky was freed after the death of Kheraskov in 1807. In 1813 Vysotsky moved to Moscow and lived there until his death.

Vysotsky studied guitar under Semyon Aksyonov. He played seven-string guitar and achieved a status of a virtuoso. His concerts attracted many local intellectuals such as poets Mikhail Lermontov or Alexander Polezhayev. He was also giving guitar lessons. Vysotsky published his first compositions soon after moving to Moscow. He mainly wrote variations of Russian folk tunes, or adapted pieces of Western composers such as Wolfgang Amadeus Mozart for guitar. In total, 83 of his compositions were published. In 1836, he published a textbook on performance of seven-string guitar.

Vysotsky was a friend of John Field and they occasionally performed together. His guitar students included Polezhayev and poet Apollon Grigoryev.
