= Ernst Mielck =

Finnish composer (1877–1899)

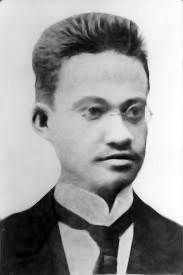
Mielck (c. 1890s)

Ernst Leopold Christian Mielck (24 October 1877 – 22 October 1899) was a Finnish composer and pianist of the late Romantic period. A precocious but sickly youth, his promising career was cut short in its infancy when he died of consumption in Locarno, Switzerland, at age 21. As a result, Mielck's œuvre is small; his most acclaimed compositions are the Symphony in F minor (Op. 4; 1897) and the Dramatic Overture (Op. 6; 1898).

== Life ==
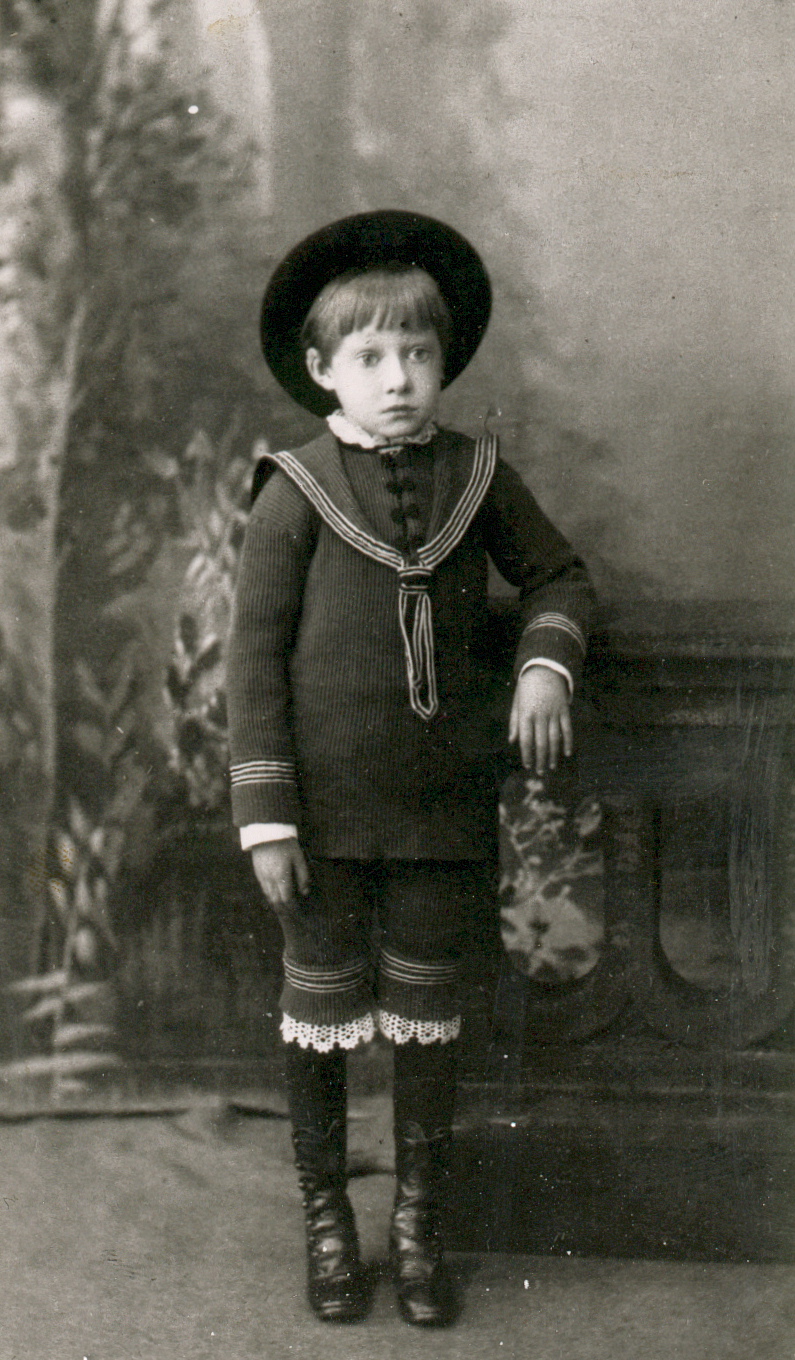
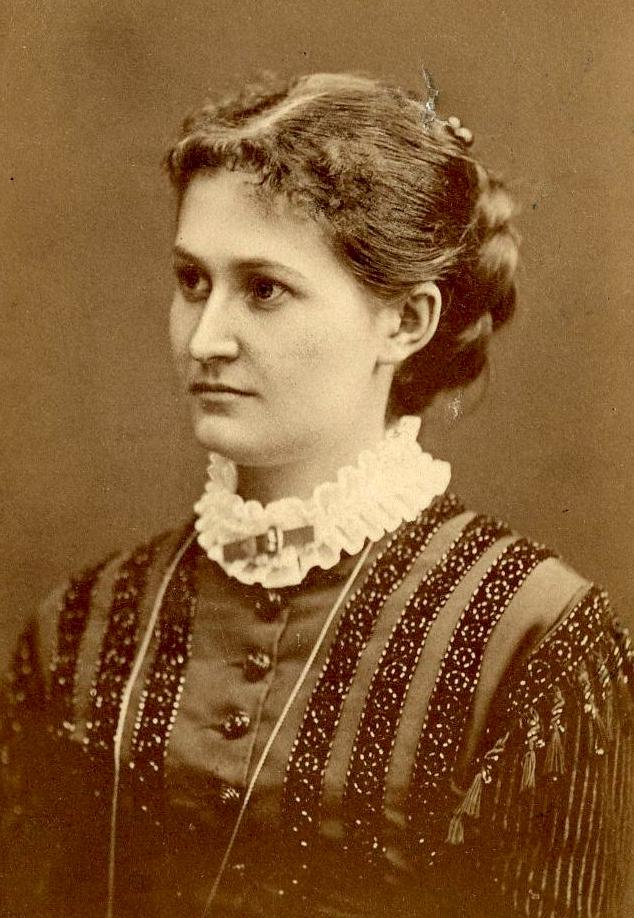
Mielck (left, at age 5)—a frail, sickly, and possibly autistic child—did not begin his music studies until age 10; he was supported by his mother, Irene (right).

Mielck was born in Viipuri (Vyborg). He started piano lessons at the age of ten; in 1891 he was sent to Berlin, where he studied under Max Bruch, one of the leading composers of the period. Bruch said of Mielck that he had "an easy, felicitous, and remarkable flair for invention." Mielck returned to Finland in 1896. Three years later he died of tuberculosis in Switzerland, at age 21.

== Music ==
Mielck composed all his works in the short span of four years. His catalogue includes a number of works in the field of chamber music, including a string quintet and a string quartet. He also composed the Symphony in F minor (1897), two overtures, a concert piece for piano and orchestra, as well as one for violin and orchestra, the Finnish Suite, and two major vocal works in the German language.

Mielck faced disappointment in his home country for the lack—with the exception of the Finnish Suite—of nationalistic (political) tendencies; his interest in the culture of his ancestral Germany made him rather a foreigner in the Finnish music scene.

It was in Germany, shortly before his death, that Mielck found his greatest success.

The enthusiasm aroused in the critics—mainly Karl Flodin in Nya Pressen—by the premiere of Mielck's symphony, on 20 October 1897, conducted by Robert Kajanus, was a motivation that prompted Jean Sibelius to try his hand at a symphony.

== List of works ==
=== With opus number ===
- Op. 1: String Quartet in G minor, for two violins, viola, and cello (1895)
- Op. 2: Ouvertüre zu Macbeth (Macbeth Overture), for orchestra (1896)
- Op. 3: String Quintet in F major, for two violins, two violas, and cello (1897)
- Op. 4: Symphony in F minor, for orchestra (1897)
- Op. 5: Altböhmisches Weihnachtslied (Old Bohemian Christmas Song), cantata for mixed chorus and orchestra (1898)
- Op. 6: Dramatische Ouvertüre (Dramatic Overture), for orchestra (1898)
- Op. 7: Altgermanisches Julfest (Old German Yule Feast), cantata for baritone, male chorus, and orchestra (1898)
- Op. 8: Concert Piece in D major, for violin and orchestra (1898)
- Op. 9: Concert Piece in E minor, for piano and orchestra (1898)
- Op 10: Finnische Suite (Finnish Suite), for orchestra (1899)

=== Without opus number ===
- Romance, for cello and piano (1894)
- Three Fantasy Pieces on Finnish Polska Motifs (1895)
- En blomma, Morgenlied, Stjernorna, and Wanderlied, for male chorus (1897)
- Two Impromptus, for piano (1899)
- Sarabande in G minor, for piano (1899)

=== Songs for voice and piano ===
- Das Fischermädchen (Text: Theodor Fontane)
- Letzter Wunsch (Text: Julius Sturm)
- Frage (Text: Julius Wolff)
- Heimath (Text: Theodor Fontane)
