= John Fernström =

Swedish composer (1897–1961)

John Fernström (6 December 1897 – 19 October 1961) was a Swedish composer. He was the founder of the Nordic Youth Orchestra.

== Early life and education ==
Fernström was born in Yichang, China, where he also spent most part of the first ten years of his life at the mission his father directed, except for a couple of years in Sweden. He resided permanently in the Swedish province of Skåne from 1907 and started to study the violin at the conservatory in Malmö.

== Career ==
He was with the symphony orchestra of Helsingborg from 1916 until 1932, with some interruptions for studies; first as a violinist, later as one of its leading conductors. From 1941 he conducted the Lund Women's Student Choir at Lund University and took part in restructuring it, in 1948, into a mixed ensemble named Lund Academic Choir (Lunds akademiska kör). Later the same year Fernström left the choir when he was appointed director of the municipal music school in the city of Lund.

In 1951 he founded the Nordic Youth Orchestra, which still today is an almost compulsory step for all young Scandinavian musicians on their way to become professional musicians. In 1953, he was elected member of the Royal Swedish Academy of Music.

== Death and legacy ==
Fernström died in Lund. He had written twelve symphonies, eight string quartets, many other chamber music pieces, concertos (among which two violin concertos, a bassoon concerto and a clarinet concerto), two operas (Echnaton and Isissystrarnas bröllop), and a large number of songs and choral pieces.
