= Symphony in F minor (Mielck) =

Symphony in four movements by Ernst Mielck

- by Ernst Mielck
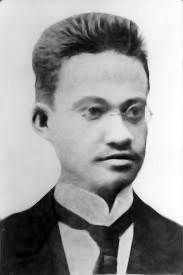
- The young composer (c. 1890s)
- Other name: Fairy Tale Symphony
- Opus: 4
- Composed: 1896–1897 (r. 1898)
- Duration: Approx. 40 minutes
- Movements: 4

Premiere
- Date: 20 October 1897
- Location: Helsinki, Grand Duchy of Finland
- Conductor: Robert Kajanus
- Performers: Helsinki Orchestral Society

The Symphony in F minor (originally referred to as the Fairy Tale Symphony; in Finnish: Satusinfonia; in Swedish: Sagosinfoni), Op. 4, is a four-movement symphony for orchestra written from 1896 to 1897 by the precocious, 19-year old Finnish composer Ernst Mielck. The piece, reportedly inspired by Hans Christian Andersen's fairy tale "The Ice-Maiden", premiered in Helsinki on 20 October 1897, with Robert Kajanus conducting the Helsinki Orchestral Society. The next year, on 3 December, Mielck experienced the greatest moment of his career when the Berlin Philharmonic, one of the world's most acclaimed orchestras, played his symphony. This success, however, was short-lived, as Mielck died of consumption on 22 October 1899 while on medical leave in Locarno, Switzerland. As such, the F minor Symphony is his only contribution to the symphonic canon.

The symphony also retains a degree of historical significance as a catalyst for Jean Sibelius: the praise for Mielck doubled as an indictment of Sibelius's delay and motivated him to attempt a symphony of his own. This process resulted two years later in the Symphony No. 1 (Op. 39). (Note: Two compositions by Sibelius that predate both Mielck's Symphony in F minor and his own Symphony No. 1 are classified occasionally as unnumbered, programmatic symphonies: Kullervo, for soloists, male chorus, and orchestra (Op. 7; 1892), and the Lemminkäinen Suite (Op. 22; 1893–95, r. 1897, 1900, 1939). Each is based upon Kalevala myths.)

== History ==
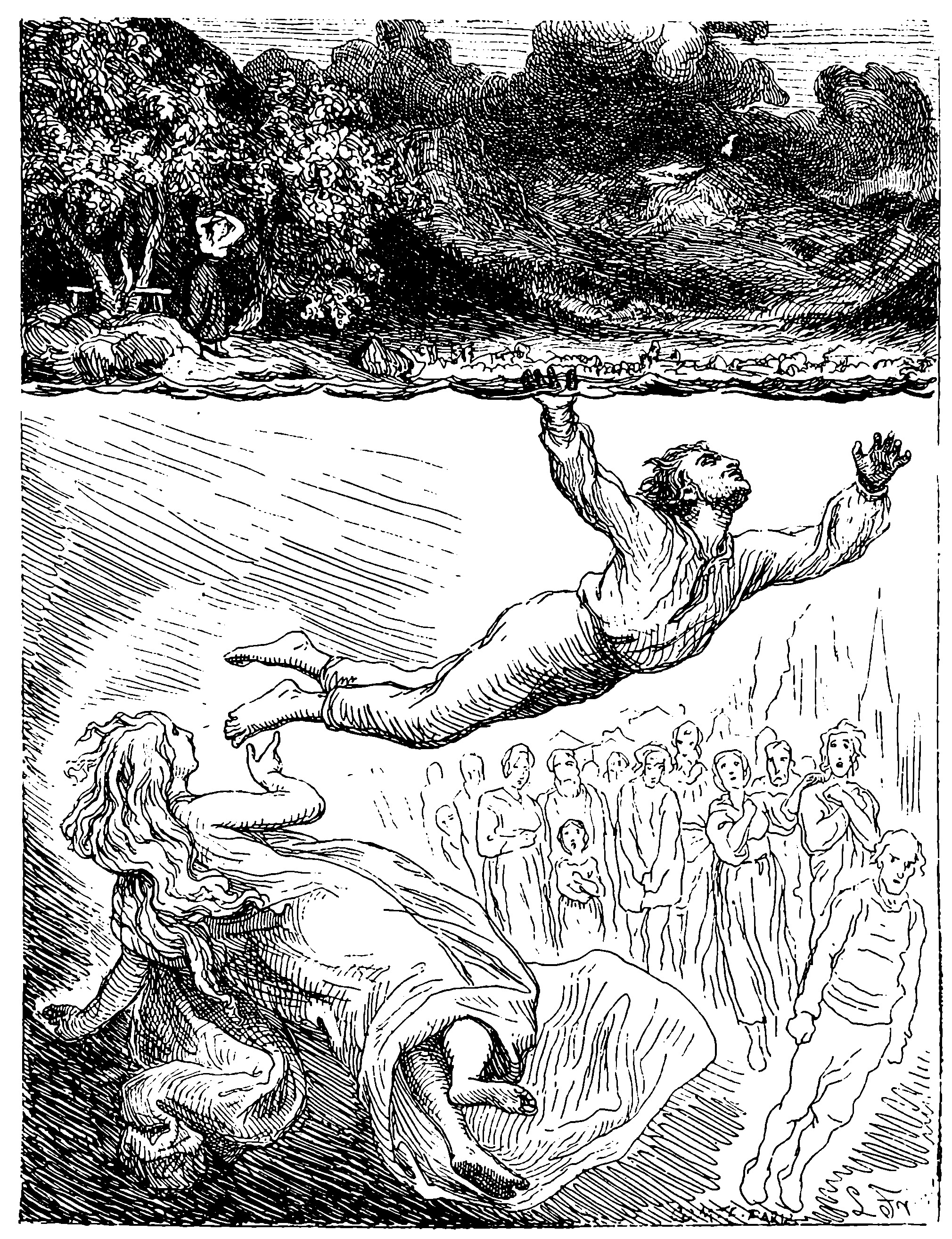
Hans Christian Andersen's fairy tale "The Ice-Maiden" reportedly inspired Mielck's symphony.

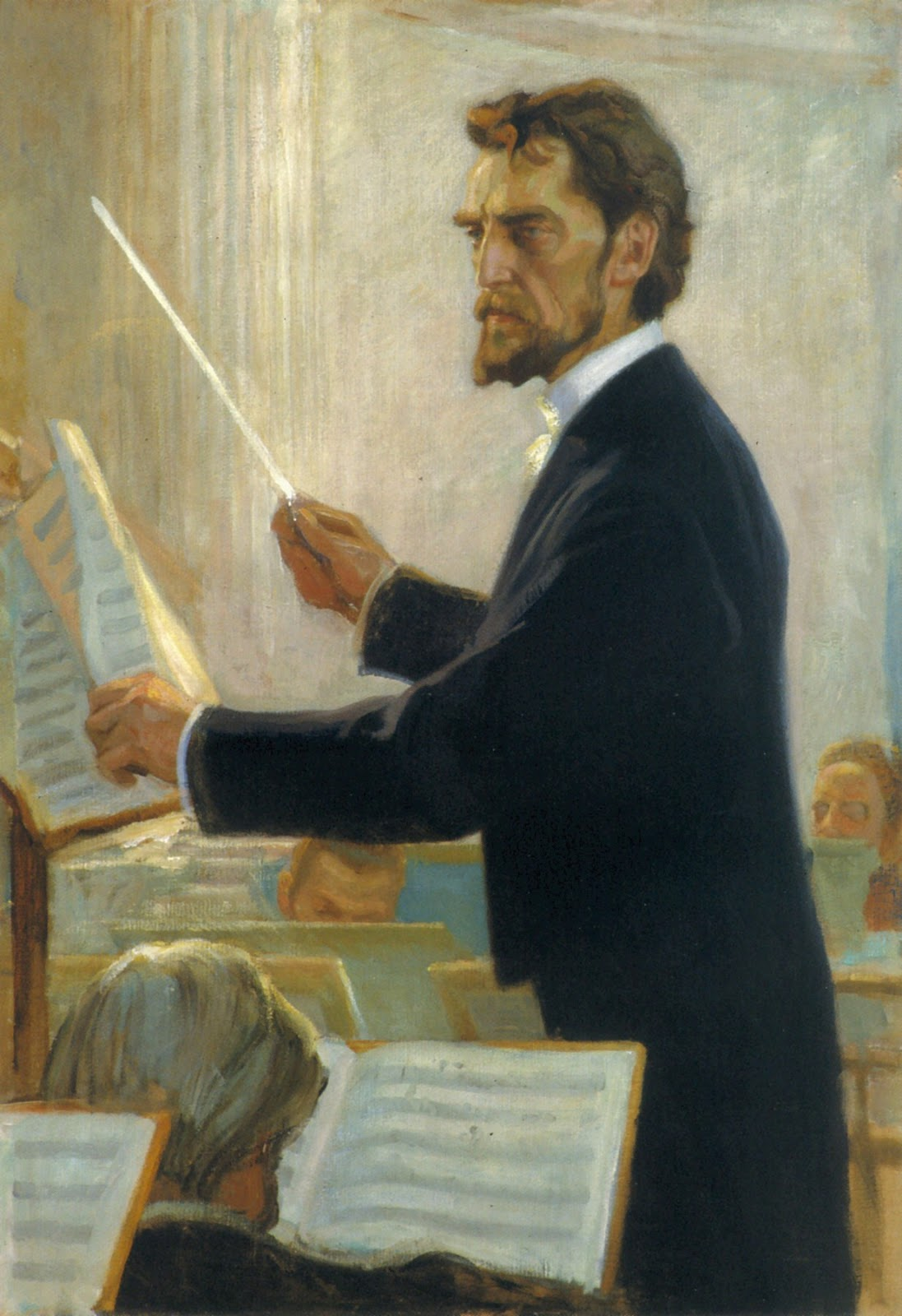
1905 painting of Kajanus conducting, by the Finnish painter Albert Edelfelt

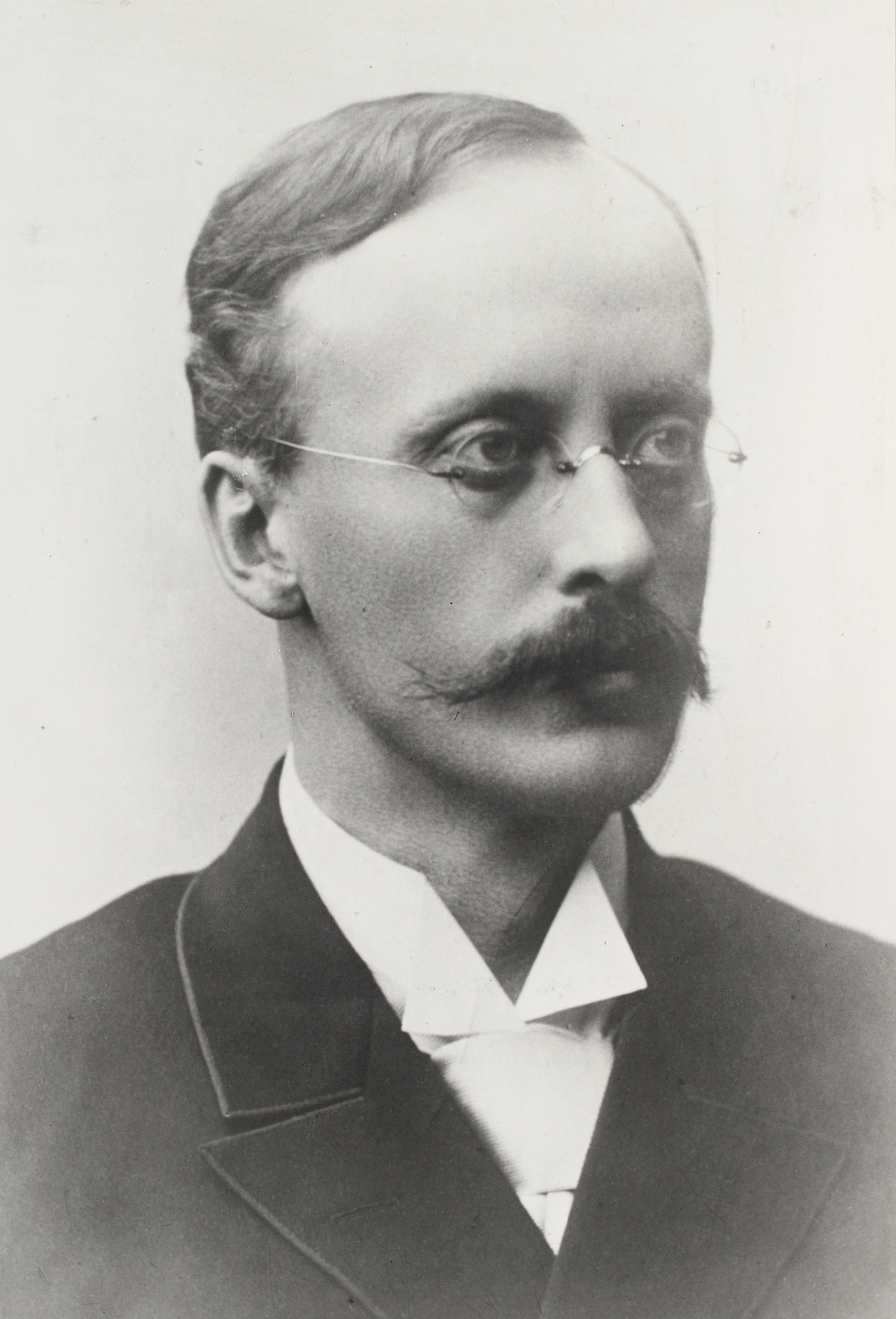
Finnish music critic Karl Flodin lauded Mielck for tackling the symphonic form.

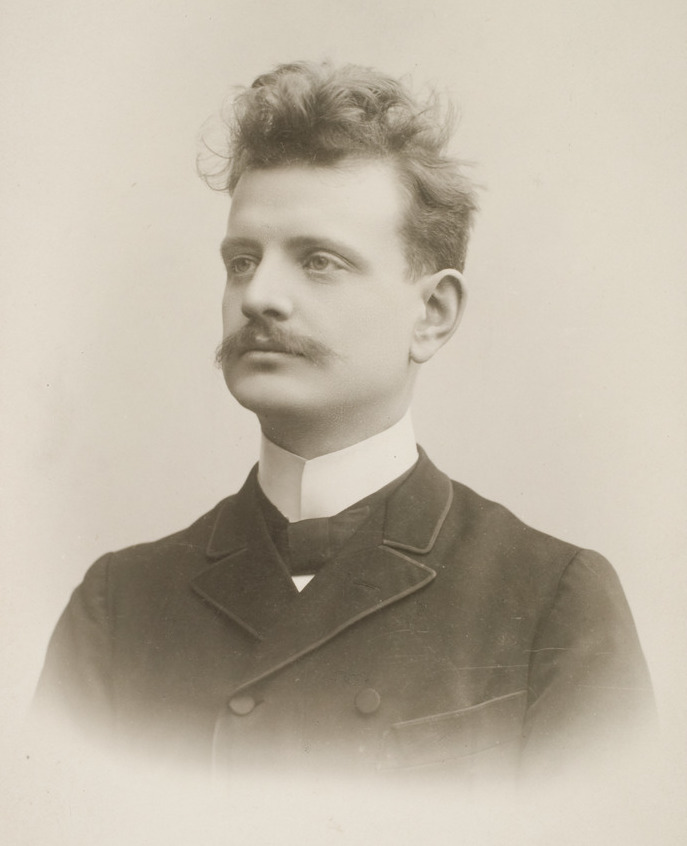
Flodin's praise of Mielck spurred Jean Sibelius to write his First Symphony (1899).

In 1894, Mielck graduated from the prestigious Stern Conservatory in Berlin. In 1895, on the advice of this teachers, he continued his schooling as a postgraduate student under the auspices of Max Bruch, who was then one of Germany's leading composers. Upon returning home to Viipuri (Vyborg) in 1896, Mielck began composing his symphony between concert appearances as a pianist, completing it in the autumn of 1897. According to the Finnish press, which advertised the Mielck symphony with the prefix "fairy tale" (Finnish: Satusinfonia; Swedish: Sagosinfoni), the young composer took inspiration from Hans Christian Andersen's "The Ice-Maiden" (Danish: Iisjomfruen).

=== Notable performances ===
Mielck's symphony received its premiere on 20 October 1897 during a composition concert at the Ceremonial Hall of the Imperial Alexander's University of Finland, Robert Kajanus conducting the Helsinki Orchestral Society (which he had founded in 1882). The program also included Mielck's String Quintet in F major (Op. 3; 1897), for two violins, two violas, and cello (performed by Gregorowitsch, Kihlman, Sante, Röllig, and Fischer), as well as Grieg's Piano Concerto in A minor (1868), with Mielck serving as soloist.

Kajanus and crew repeated the symphony at the same venue four days later on the afternoon of 24 October; this time, no other compositions by Mielck were programmed, but he was nonetheless on hand to play solo piano pieces by other composers. A third performance of the symphony was planned for 26 October in Turku (Åbo), with José Eibenschütz conducting the Turku Musical Society (and amateur reinforcements). However, when the orchestral parts failed to arrive in time, the orchestra was forced to substitute Mielck's Macbeth Overture (Op. 2; 1896) for the symphony. Also on the program was Grieg's Piano Concerto, with Mielck as soloist, and the String Quintet in F major (Novácèk, Dörner, Bröckl, Eiben, and Nast).

The Helsinki critics responded positively.

After these performances, Mielck returned to Berlin to resume his studies under Bruch, who "was full of praise" upon seeing his pupil's latest compositions. He suggested some modifications, and Mielck set about revising the symphony in the autumn of 1898. A milestone arrived when on 3 December 1898 Mielck held a composition concert at the Berlin Singing Academy, with Josef Řebíček conducting the Berlin Philharmonic in three of the young Finn's works: the F minor Symphony, the Dramatic Overture (Op. 6; 1898), and the Concert Piece in E minor for Piano and Orchestra (Op. 9; 1898), for which Mielck served as soloist.

The Berlin concert was followed a few months later by one on 11 March 1899 at the Dresden Gewerbehaus, with Friedrich August Trenkler conducting the Dresden Philharmonic. Mielck's symphony was in the provisional program for Kajanus's Finnish music concert at the 1900 Paris Exposition, but was replaced by Sibelius's Symphony No. 1 (then known simply as the Symphony in E minor).

== Structure ==
There are four movements:

1. Andante maestoso – Allegro energico
2. Allegro non troppo
3. Andante cantabile
4. Allegro

== Recordings ==
The table below lists all commercially available recordings of Mielck's Symphony in F minor:

No.	Conductor	Orchestra	Rec. (Note: Refers to the year in which the performers recorded the work; this may not be the same as the year in which the recording was first released to the general public.)	Time	Recording venue	Label	Ref.
1	Hannu Lintu	Turku Philharmonic Orchestra	1999	40:40	Turku Concert Hall	Sterling	(Note: H. Lintu–Sterling (CDS–1035–2) 1999)
2	Sakari Oramo	Finnish Radio Symphony Orchestra	2002	40:55	Järvenpää Hall	Ondine	(Note: S. Oramo–Ondine (ODE 1019–2) 2003)

== Notes, references, and sources ==
=== Sources ===
==== Books ====
- Barnett, Andrew (2007). Sibelius. New Haven, Connecticut: Yale University Press. ISBN 9780300163971.
- Korhonen, Kimmo [in Finnish] (2007) [2003]. Inventing Finnish Music: Contemporary Composers from Medieval to Modern. (Jaakko Mäntyjärvi, English translation) (2nd ed.). Jyväskylä, Finland: Finnish Music Information Center (FIMIC) & Gummerus Kirjapaino oy. ISBN 9789525076615.
- Tawaststjerna, Erik (2008) [1965/1967; trans. 1976]. Sibelius: Volume I, 1865–1905. (Robert Layton, English translation). London: Faber and Faber. ISBN 9780571247721.

==== Liner notes ====
- Häyrynen, Antti (2003). Ernst Mielck: Symphony in F minor / Concert Piece for Violin and Orchestra (booklet). Sakari Oramo & Finnish Radio Symphony Orchestra. Ondine. p. 3–4. ODE 1019–2. OCLC 52924518
- Hyttner, Bo (1999). Ernst Mielck: Symphony in F minor, Op. 4 / Concert Piece for Piano and Orchestra, Op. 9 (booklet). Hannu Lintu & Turku Philharmonic Orchestra. Sterling. p. 7–11. CDS–1035–2. OCLC 45052045

==== Newspaper articles (by date) ====
- K. [Flodin, Karl] [in Finnish] (21 October 1897). "Ernst Mielcks konsert" [Ernst Mielck's concert]. Nya Pressen (in Swedish). No. 286. p. 2–3.
- A. U. [Uggla, Alarik] [in Finnish] (21 October 1897). "Ernst Mielcks konsert" [Ernst Mielck's concert]. Hufvudstadsbladet (in Swedish). No. 286. p. 4.
- "Eftermiddag-konsert" [Afternoon concert]. Nya Pressen (in Swedish). No. 289. 24 October 1897. p. 2.
- "Ernst Mielck Kompositions-konsert" [Ernest Mielck's composition concert]. Åbo Underrättelser (in Swedish). No. 290. 25 October 1897. p. 1.
- "Hr. Ernst Mielck" [Mr. Ernst Mielck]. Wiborgsbladet (in Swedish). No. 282. 4 December 1898. p. 3.
- "Om hr Ernst Mielcks F-moll sinfoni" [About Mr. Ernest Mielck's F minor Symphony]. Nya Pressen (in Swedish). No. 80. 23 March 1899. p. 3.
