= Hjerteslag =

Norwegian alternative rock band

- Origin: Bergen, Norway
- Genres: Pop rock, alternative rock
- Years active: 2011–present
- Labels: Eget Selskap, Fysisk Format
- Members: Robert Eidevik; Arve Isdal; Yngve Andersen; Herbrand Larsen; Ivar Thormodsæther
- Past members: Petter Sætre; Ole Andre Hjelmås; Nikolas Jon Aarland; Torjus Raknes
- Website: Official Facebook page

Hjerteslag (lit. "Heartbeat") is a Norwegian alternative rock band, formed in Bergen in 2011.

== History ==
The band was formed by singer and songwriter Robert Eidevik in 2011 and in 2014 the band played at the music festivals by:Larm and in 2015 at Øyafestivalen.

In January 2015, they were nominated for Årets Urørt with the song "Papirsvaner". In March 2015, the band released their debut album Møhlenpris motel, which was well received by critics.

In 2016 came album number two, Vannmann86. The album was nominated for the 2016 Spellemann Award for "Best Rock" album. The single "Sang Til Sonja" got some playing time on NRK P3.

During the first half of the corona pandemic in 2021, several band members chose to quit.

During the corona pandemic (2021–2022), Robert Eidevik, together with new band members Arve Isdal, Yngve Andersen and Ivar Thormodsæter, recorded a new album, Tyvens dagbok.

== Band members ==
Members

- Robert Eidevik – lead vocals, guitars (2011–present)
- Arve Isdal – guitars (2021–present)
- Yngve Andersen – bass (2021–present)
- Herbrand Larsen – keyboards, guitars (2023–present)
- Ivar Thormodsæther – drums (2021–present)

Former members

- Petter Sætre – drums (2011–2021)
- Ole Andre Hjelmås – bass (2011–2021)
- Nikolas Jon Aarland – guitars (2011–2021)
- Torjus Raknes – guitars (2013–2021)

== Discography ==
Studio albums

- Møhlenpris motell (2015)
- Vannmann86 (2016)
- Nattseileren (2018)
- Tyvens dagbok (2022)
- Betonglandskap (2024)
- Vi har kommet for å stjele dine barn (2026)
