= 2026 in Nordic music =

The following is a list of notable events and releases that happened in Nordic music in 2026.

== Events ==
- 5 January – Following US President Donald Trump's threat to annexe Greenland, singer Björk comes out in favour of Greenland's independence.
- 1 February – Among the nominees at the 68th Annual Grammy Awards are Ghost for Best Metal Performance, Bohuslän Big Band (with Danilo Pérez) for Best Large Jazz Ensemble Album, and Ludwig Göransson for Best Score Soundtrack Album for Visual Media.
- 26–27 February – Children of Bodom will play their first shows in seven years at the Tavastia Club in Helsinki, titled "A Celebration of Music". Both shows are to be held as a tribute to their original vocalist and guitarist Alexi Laiho, who died in 2020, with Samy Elbanna of Lost Society filling in for him.
- 9 April – Pekka Kuusisto announces that he is suspending United States engagements in protest at the conduct of the current US government.
- 23–25 April – Jazzahead festival in Germany features a "Danish Clubnight". Scandinavian performers include the Kathrine Windfeld Sextet, Sinne Eeg & Jacob Christoffersen.
- June – Zara Larsson is among the acts slated to appear at the Roskilde Festival.
- Autumn – Esa-Pekka Salonen takes up his new position as Creative Director of the Los Angeles Philharmonic in the United States.

== Top hit singles ==
- Felicia Eriksson – "My System" (#1 Sweden)
- Haloo Helsinki! – "Voiko enkelitkin eksyä" (#5 Finland)
- Zara Larsson – "Lush Life" (re-entry; #3 Sweden, #6 Denmark)
- Pete Parkkonen and Linda Lampenius – "Liekinheitin" (#1 Finland)

== Albums released ==
=== January ===
Day	Artist	Album	Label	Notes	Ref.
2	Bergen Philharmonic Orchestra	Brahms: Symphonies Nos. 2 & 4	Chandos	Conducted by Edward Gardner	
7	Sondre Lerche	Turning Up the Heat Again	PLZ		
9	For My Pain...	Buried Blue	Rainheart Productions	Tour launch album	
23	Agnes	Beautiful Madness	Polydor Sweden		
30	Møl	Dreamcrush	Nuclear Blast		
30	Therion	Con Orquesta	Napalm Records	Live album	

=== February ===
Day	Artist	Album	Label	Notes	Ref.
6	Mayhem	Liturgy of Death	Century Media		
6	Wolverine	Anomalies	Music Theories Recordings	First album since 2016	
13	Kuumaa	Valoa varten	Universal Music Finland		
20	Clawfinger	Before We All Die	Perception	First studio album for 18 years	
20	Stam1na	Apnea			
27	Stavanger Symphony Orchestra	Nielsen - Symphonies 2 & 4	Lawo Classics	Conducted by Andris Poga	

=== March ===
Day	Artist	Album	Label	Notes	Ref.
6	Lost Society	Hell Is a State of Mind	Nuclear Blast		
6	Vreid	The Skies Turn Black	Indie Recordings	Includes official score for the 2026 film Kraken	
13	Witchcraft	A Sinner's Child	Heavy Psych Sounds Records	EP	
27	Defacing God	Darkness Is My Crown	Apostasy Records		

=== April ===
Day	Artist	Album	Label	Notes	Ref.
3	Green Carnation	A Dark Poem, Pt. II: Sanguis	Season of Mist	Second album in a trilogy	
10	Vomitory	In Death Throes	Metal Blade		

=== May ===
Day	Artist	Album	Label	Notes	Ref.
8	Darkthrone	Pre-Historic Metal	Peaceville		
8	Draconian	In Somnolent Ruin	Metal Blade		

=== August ===
Day	Artist	Album	Label	Notes	Ref.
14	Gothenburg Symphony Orchestra conducted by Pekka Kuusisto	Lost Landscapes	Alpha Records	Recording of Anders Hillborg's 2020 work and two others	
21	Dark Funeral	A Beast to Praise	Century Media Records	Live album	

=== September ===
Day	Artist	Album	Label	Notes	Ref.
4	Green Carnation	A Dark Poem, Pt. III: The Messiah Complex	Season Of Mist	Part 3 of the "A Dark Poem" trilogy	
11	Archgoat	Nightbringer, Lightbringer	Debemur Morti Productions		
18	Runemagick	After Chaos: Nocturnal Vigil	Hammerheart Records		

== Classical works ==
- Stefan Klaverdal – Och näktergalen i mina drömmar

== Film and television music ==
- Amorphis – Kalevala: The Story of Kullervo
- Kaspar Kaae & Johan Testad – The Swedish Connection

== Deaths ==
- 2 January – Ritva Auvinen, Finnish opera singer (born 1932)
- 18 January – Anders Möller, Swedish rick musician (Black Ingvars, Swedish Erotica) (cancer; born 1962)
- 21 January – Kristinn Svavarsson, Icelandic saxophonist (Mezzoforte; born 1947)
- 7 February – Kåre Grøttum, Norwegian jazz pianist and composer (born 1934)
- 1 March – Johann (J.) Strauss, rock musician, age unknown
- 12 March – Hjálmar H. Ragnarsson, Icelandic composer (born 1952)
- 9 April – Björgvin Halldórsson, Icelandic Eurovision singer (born 1951)
- 21 April – Lena Maria Gårdenäs, Swedish singer and actress (born 1947)
- 24 April – Busk Margit Jonsson, Swedish operatic soprano (born 1929)
- 25 April – Jesper Thilo, Danish jazz saxophonist (born 1941)
- 30 April – Georg Wadenius, Swedish guitarist, 80
- 26 May – Bjørn Tidmand, Danish Eurovision singer, 86
- 13 June – Görel Hanser, Swedish record company executive and talent manager, 76
- 6 July
  - Megas, Icelandic singer and songwriter, 81
  - Roger Svensson (B. War), Swedish bassist, 60
- 14 July – Little Gerhard (Karl-Gerhard Lundkvist), Swedish singer, 92
- 30 July – Gunnar Þórðarson, Icelandic songwriter, guitarist, producer and composer, 81
- 16 October – Jonas "Heavy" Stentäpp, Swedish musician, 50 (lung cancer)
- 18 October – Gary Heffern, Finnish-American punk rock singer, 72
- 19 October – Hilkka Kinnunen, Finnish soprano, 101
- 28 October – Gullan Bornemark, Swedish musician and composer, 98
