= 1947 in Nordic music =

The following is a list of notable events and compositions of the year 1947 in Nordic music.

== Events ==
- 12 July – Líf, the 18-year-old daughter of composer Jón Leifs, drowns while swimming off the coast of Sweden. The impact on her father and his musical creativity is huge.
- 10 December – Lars-Erik Larsson's Concertino for bassoon and string orchestra is premièred on Swedish Radio.
- unknown date – Norwegian composer Edvard Fliflet Bræin makes his conducting debut in Bergen.

== New works ==
- Vagn Holmboe – Symphony No. 6
- Jón Leifs – Requiem
- Harald Sæverud – Peer Gynt (incidental music)

== Popular music ==
- Evert Taube – "Här är den sköna sommar"

== Film music ==
- Sven Gyldmark – Familien Swedenhielm
- Kai Møller – Soldaten og Jenny
- Gunnar Sønstevold – Sankt Hans fest

== Musical films ==
- Tappa inte sugen, with music by Albert Harris and Julius Jacobsen (Swedish version of a British musical)

== Births ==
- 27 January – Björn Afzelius, Swedish singer-songwriter and guitarist (died 1999)
- 3 April – Anders Eliasson Swedish composer (died 2013)
- 20 April – Björn Skifs, Swedish singer
- 24 July – Loa Falkman, Swedish opera singer
- 15 August – Gertrud Maria Mell, Swedish musician and composer (died 2016)

== Deaths ==
- 17 January – Agnes Janson, Swedish operatic mezzo-soprano (born 1861)
- 20 March – Sigurd Wallén, Swedish actor and singer (born 1884)
- 11 May – Ture Rangström, Swedish composer (born 1884)
- 23 May – Per Kvist, Norwegian revue writer and entertainer (born 1890)
- 28 June – Per Steenberg, Norwegian organist and composer (born 1870)
- 6 October – Leevi Madetoja, Finnish composer (born 1887)
- 28 November – Georg Schnéevoigt, Finnish cellist, conductor and composer (born 1872)

== See also ==
- 1947 in Denmark
- 1947 in Iceland
- 1947 in Norwegian music
- 1947 in Sweden
