= Musicology in Iceland =

Like the cultivation of Western "classical" music in general, musicology in Iceland only developed slowly in the twentieth century. In the twenty-first century, several scholars have made significant contributions to the practice of musicology in Iceland, often with a focus on local traditions of classical, traditional, and popular music.

== Early 20th century ==
The last decades of the nineteenth century saw increased interest in preserving the traditional tales, poems, and songs of the Icelandic population. Although music was the last of the local art forms to be collected, the collecting and publication of local folk songs can be said to be the starting point for musicology in Iceland. In 1892, the second volume of a four-volume collection, Íslenzkar gátur, skemtanir, vikivakar og þulur, (Icelandic Riddles, Entertainments, and Folk Poetry) was published in Copenhagen; it had been collected by Ólafur Davíðsson and contained 38-page summary of Icelandic music (the first in print) and 10 songs, transcribed by Árni Beinteinn Gíslason and Páll Melsteð. These transcriptions were later criticized by Bjarni Þorsteinsson as being woefully inaccurate.

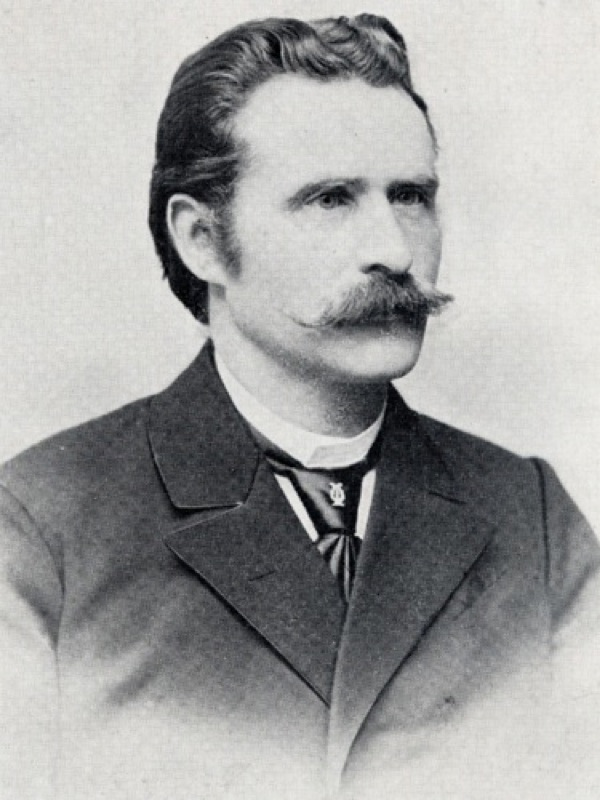
Bjarni Þorsteinsson, composer and collector of Icelandic folk songs.

By the time of its publication, Bjarni Þorsteinsson had already begun collecting folk-songs, and eventually his work would become a substantial book of nearly 1000 pages that remains a standard reference work to this day. Íslenzk þjóðlög (Icelandic Folk Songs) is far more than a collection of vernacular songs. It can be divided into three main sections: transcriptions from manuscripts dating from the Middle Ages until ca. 1800; music from printed books, including the Graduale first published in 1594; and transcriptions of local traditional songs, made by Þorsteinsson himself as well as friends and acquaintances in various parts of Iceland, including Benedikt Jónsson (1846–1939) and Sigtryggur Guðlaugsson (1862–1959). Although many of Þorsteinsson's transcriptions from older manuscripts have been criticized by modern standards, his book as a whole is considered a monumental contribution to Icelandic musical scholarship.

Among other contributions to folk-song collecting in the early 20th century were recordings of local singers, made with Edison wax cylinders. The earliest of these were made in the 1910s by Jón Pálsson and others, but a substantial contribution was also made by the composer Jón Leifs, who traveled from Germany (where he was living at the time) to make three substantial collecting trips: in 1925, 1926 and 1928 (he added slightly to the collection in 1934). His recordings have been made available on Ismus, the Icelandic website for traditional music and music scholarship. In the 1930s, Sidney Robertson Cowell recorded the singing of Icelandic expatriates in California as part of the WPA California Folk Music Project; her recordings are now available through the Library of Congress website.

== Mid- to late 20th century ==
The first Icelander to study musicology in a university setting was Hallgrímur Helgason, who completed a doctorate from the University of Zurich (1955) with a thesis on the performance of traditional epic poetry. Upon returning to Iceland, he wrote several books on the history of Icelandic music, but otherwise his career was largely focused on composition and teaching. A significant contribution to Icelandic musicology in the mid-20th century was that of Róbert Abraham Ottósson, an exiled musician from Nazi Germany who arrived in Iceland in 1935 and became a leading figure on the music scene, as conductor, arranger, teacher, and scholar. His doctoral thesis, on the 13th-century rhymed office for Saint Thorlákur, was published in 1959. Although his schedule in later years did not allow for further such substantial undertakings, he wrote several important articles, including entries for The New Grove Dictionary of Music and Musicians, before his untimely death in 1974. Another significant contribution was a biography of Sveinbjörn Sveinbjörnsson, author of Iceland's national anthem, written by the composer and administrator Jón Þórarinsson, and published in 1969.

Following Ottósson's death, music scholarship in Iceland dropped off for more than a decade. An exception was research on folk singing, both rímur and hymns. Hreinn Steingrímsson (1930–1988) worked on a large-scale work on the scale patterns and melodic variations in rímur singing, intended as a dissertation at the University of Iceland, but rejected. His work, Kvæðaskapur: Icelandic Epic Song, was published posthumously in 2000. Another scholar, Smári Ólason (1946–2023), researched the hymn melodies sung to the poetry of the Baroque poet Hallgrímur Pétursson.

In the late 1960s and early 1970s, Helga Jóhannsdóttir (1935–2006), who had studied musicology at Copenhagen University and worked at the National Radio and later the Árni Magnússon Institute, collected a significant amount of ethnographic material by interviewing elderly Icelanders throughout the country. All of her recordings, a total of more than 10,000 individual items, have now been made available on the Ísmús website. She also published shorter essays on the origins of Icelandic hymn tunes whose history had been unknown until then.

In 1980, the composer Hjálmar H. Ragnarsson completed a MFA-thesis from Cornell University on the music of Jón Leifs, which would prove to be the beginning of a reevaluation of that composer and contains detailed analyses of several of his works. Around 1990, Jón Þórarinsson was granted a state subsidy to write a history of Icelandic music; this was published posthumously and covers the period from 1000 to 1800.

== 1990s to present ==
In the 1990s and early 2000s, a younger generation of scholars began to make its presence felt in Iceland. Bjarki Sveinbjörnsson (b. 1953) studied musicology in Denmark, with a MA-thesis on the music of Jón Nordal, and a doctoral thesis on the development of modernism and electronic music in the 1960s and 1970s. Sveinbjörnsson worked for the Icelandic National Radio from 2002–2006, and subsequently founded a museum dedicated to Icelandic Music (Tónlistarsafn Íslands) in Kópavogur, along with Jón Hrólfur Sigurjónsson. In 2017, the museum was taken over by the National and University Library of Iceland, where the two worked until their retirement in 2023. In December 2024, he expressed his concern that no one had been hired to replace the two employees specializing in music at the National Library due to budget cuts, and that this would be detrimental for musicological research in Iceland.

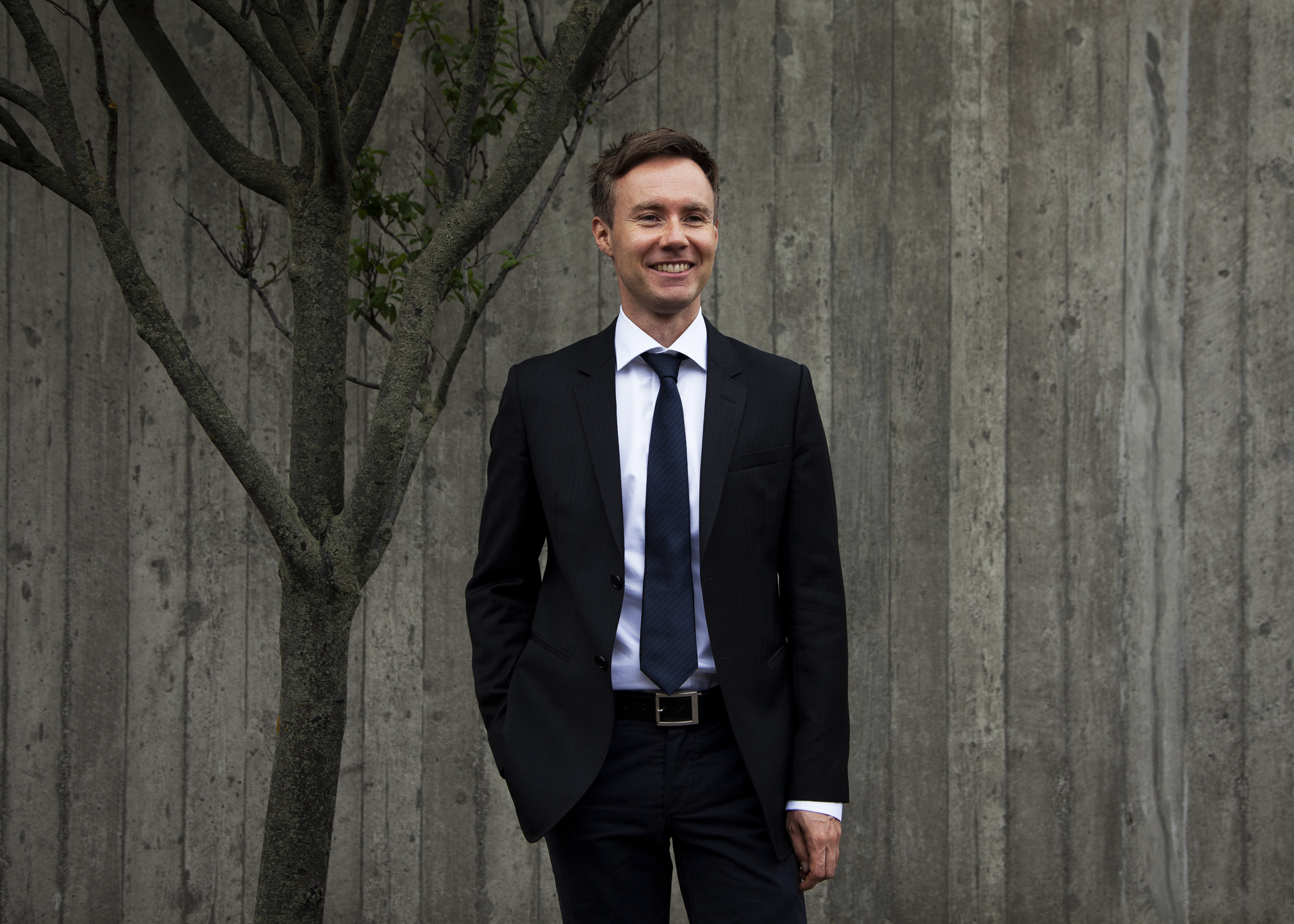
Árni Heimir Ingólfsson, Icelandic musicologist.

A leading Icelandic musicologist of a younger generation is Árni Heimir Ingólfsson (b. 1973), who studied historical musicology at Harvard University and wrote a doctoral thesis on the written and oral traditions of tvísöngur, the Icelandic tradition of two-part singing. In terms of publications, he has been Iceland's most prolific musicologist, with books including a biography of Jón Leifs (2009/2019), a general history of classical music in Icelandic (the first such publication, 2016), and a book about exiled musicians from Nazi Germany and their influence on the development of music in Iceland in the mid-20th century. In addition, he has written several articles on music in manuscripts from the early modern period, and edited two publications with musical notation from the surviving manuscripts. He has also been active as a performer, including three CDs of music from Icelandic manuscripts dating from the 15th to the 18th centuries.

More recently, Icelandic musicologists have begun to focus on Iceland's popular music and the scene that has created and sustained it. Arnar Eggert Thoroddsen (b. 1974) has approached Iceland's history of pop and rock music from a sociological perspective, while Þorbjörg Daphne Hall (b. 1984) has researched the image of Iceland in terms of its music, as well as writing on the history of jazz in Iceland, and Icelandic patriotic songs in the 19th and early 20th centuries. Since 2023, Hall is Professor of Musicology at the Iceland University of the Arts. In addition, Helga Rut Guðmundsdóttir (b. 1970) has researched music education in Icelandic schools.

Increasingly, scholars from other countries have begun to view Icelandic music as a topic worthy of study. These include substantial contributions by Nicola Dibben on Björk, and Carl-Gunnar Åhlén and Florian Heesch on Jón Leifs. The Norwegian musicologist Tore Størvold has written on music, nature, and cultural identity in Iceland, as well as writing on Hildur Guðnadóttir's music for the Chernobyl television series. Stephen Long is one of several musicologists who have examined the music of Anna Þorvaldsdóttir, writing in particular about her use of drones. Some scholars have lived in Iceland for years or decades, thus combining an outsider's and insider's perspective. These include the UK-born Robert Faulkner (b. 1960) who moved to Iceland in 1986 and has written a book about the everyday vocal practices of Icelandic men.

In addition, an increasing number of Icelandic musicians have completed DMA-degrees or integrated study in performance and scholarship, and have thus contributed to music research as well as performance. The pianist Nína Margrét Grímsdóttir (b. 1965) wrote a DMA-thesis from CUNY in 2010 on the piano works of Páll Ísólfsson, Kristín Jónína Taylor wrote a DMA-thesis on Jón Nordal's Piano Concerto, and Bragi Þór Valsson (b. 1978) completed his doctorate from Stellenbosch University with a thesis on the choral works of Þorkell Sigurbjörnsson.

Institutionally, musicology is largely supported by the universities, primarily the Iceland University of the Arts and the University of Iceland. Other institutions, such as the Reykjavík Academy and the Árni Magnússon Institute, have supported musicological research through grants from Rannsóknasjóður, the Icelandic Research Fund. As of 2025, two large-scale research projects are supported by this fund: "Building Bridges Through Collaboration" (IUA) is a study of approaches to socially engaged music-making, while "Modernism in Icelandic Music" (Reykjavík Academy) has a focus on the introduction of modernist music in Iceland in the years ca. 1950–1980, including a study of leading composers and analyses of key works and their reception.
