= 1951 in Nordic music =

The following is a list of notable events and compositions of the year 1951 in Nordic music.

== Events ==
- 25 June – Norwegian musicians Egil Monn-Iversen and Sølvi Wang are married at the Uranienborg Church in Oslo.
- unknown date – Frank Meidell Falch is appointed the first director of the Bergen International Festival (1951–1956).

== New works ==
- Hugo Alfvén – Sängen till Folkare
- Bengt Hambraeus – Cantata pro defunctis for baritone and organ
- Vagn Holmboe – Symphony No. 8, "Sinfonia boreale"
- Allan Pettersson – Seven Sonatas for Two Violins
- David Wikander – Missa brevis in festis

== Popular music ==
- Karl Gerhard, Kaj Stighammar & Herbert Steen – "Axlarna ska slutta"
- Tapio Rautavaaran – "Isoisän olkihattu"

== Film music ==
- Dag Wirén – Fröken Julie

== Musical films ==
- Mød mig på Cassiopeia, with music by Kai Normann Andersen, starring Bodil Kjer

== Births ==
- 10 January – Karólína Eiríksdóttir, Icelandic composer
- 1 March – Kristinn Sigmundsson, Icelandic operatic bass
- 12 April – Anneli Arho, Finnish music teacher, writer and composer
- 14 April – Terje Tysland, Norwegian singer and songwriter.
- 12 May – Jacob Groth, Danish film score composer
- 9 June – Geir Bøhren, Norwegian musician and film composer
- 15 October – Anne-Karine Strøm, Norwegian singer
- 8 December – Jan Eggum, Norwegian singer-songwriter

== Deaths ==
- 24 January – Hildor Lundvik, Swedish composer (born 1885)
- 6 April – Halfdan Cleve, Norwegian composer (born 1879)
- 19 August – Christian Geisler, Danish organist and composer (born 1869)
- 13 December – Selim Palmgren, Finnish composer (born 1878)

== See also ==
- 1951 in Denmark
- 1951 in Iceland
- 1951 in Norwegian music
- 1951 in Sweden
