= 1952 in Nordic music =

The following is a list of notable events and compositions of the year 1952 in Nordic music.

== Events ==
- 11 January – Lars-Erik Larsson's Violin Concerto is premièred on Swedish radio by the Swedish Radio Orchestra, with André Gertler as soloist.
- 19 April – David Wikander's Olavus Petri Cantata is recorded at Stockholm Cathedral, with Wikander himself conducting and Olle Björling (brother of Jussi Björling) as one of the soloists.
- c. July – Finnish composer Aarre Merikanto wins the Olympic hymn competition.
- unknown date – David Wikander receives the Royal Swedish medal, Litteris et artibus.

== New works ==
- Erik Bergman – Espressivo
- Jón Leifs – Endurskin úr norðri (Réminiscence du nord)
- Gösta Nystroem – Symphony No. 4, "Sinfonia Shakespeariana"
- David Wikander – Olavus Petri Cantata
- Dag Wirén – Symphony No. 4

== Popular music ==
- Gunnar Engedahl & Erling Stordahl – "Leken mellom roser"
- Martti Jäppilä – "Iltatuulen viesti" (performed by Matti Kanto with the Masan Harmonikkaorkesteri)

== Film music ==
- Håkan von Eichwald – När syrenerna blomma

== Musical films ==
- Eldfågeln, with music by Stig Rybrant, starring Tito Gobbi and Eva Henning

== Births ==
- 13 January – Pekka Pohjola, Finnish musician and composer (died 2008)
- 25 February – Tomas Ledin, Swedish singer and songwriter
- 25 June – Radka Toneff, Norwegian jazz singer (died 1982)
- 14 October – Kaija Saariaho, Finnish composer (died 2023)
- 23 December – Hans Abrahamsen, Danish composer

== Deaths ==
- 23 March – Margit Rosengren, Swedish operetta singer (born 1901)
- 10 July – Rued Langgaard, Danish composer and organist (born 1893)
- 14 December – Fartein Valen, Norwegian composer and musical theorist (born 1887)

== See also ==
- 1952 in Denmark
- 1952 in Iceland
- 1952 in Norwegian music
- 1952 in Sweden
