= Copenhagen Boys Choir =

The Copenhagen Royal Chapel Choir, located in Denmark, is recognized as one of Scandinavia's oldest choral institutions. Choristers of the choir undergo vocal training at the Copenhagen Municipal Choir School, including Sankt Anna Gymnasium (St. Anne's Gymnasium) and fulfill their choir duties at Copenhagen Cathedral (The Church of Our Lady).

The choir is internationally acclaimed for its interpretations of Renaissance and Baroque music, as well as 20th-century choral compositions for boys' and men's voices. It performs a significant number of concerts annually, both within Denmark and internationally.

== History ==
Copenhagen Royal Chapel Choir was founded by Mogens Wöldike in 1924 after a visit to Copenhagen by the famous Thomanerchor, the boys' choir of St. Thomas Church, Leipzig, Bach's own choir. From the start the aim of the choir was to perform choral music written for boys' and men's voices from the Middle Ages to the 20th century. On Carl Nielsen's recommendation the City Council of Copenhagen in 1929 established a Choir School for the boys, the present Sankt Annæ Gymnasium. In this way, the members of the choir were guaranteed a comprehensive, thorough vocal training and musical education as an integral part of their school curriculum.

Each year Sankt Annæ Gymnasium recruits new pupils with vocal and musical ability from eight-year-old school children in and around Copenhagen.

Today the Choir School also houses Sankt Annæ Pigekor (Copenhagen Girls' Choir) and Sankt Annæ Gymnasiekor (St. Anne's Youth Choir).

Until 1959 Copenhagen Royal Chapel Choir was permanently attached to Christiansborg Slotskirke (The Chapel of Christiansburg Castle), but since then the choir has been giving regular concerts every Friday evening in Copenhagen Cathedral throughout the main season, as well as at High Mass and Vespers in the cathedral. Because of its connection with both Sankt Annæ Gymnasium and Copenhagen Cathedral the choir is the oldest representative in Scandinavia of European choral music as the Cathedral School Tradition.

The Boys of Our Lady's Church flourished especially in the 16th and 17th centuries when they were also part of the Copenhagen Royal Chapel Choir. The richness of this period's musical life is also reflected in the repertoire of the Boys' Choir at the present time.

== Present ==
Copenhagen Royal Chapel Choir today often performs in connection with the Royal Family's major festivities, at State Visits abroad as well as at many other official arrangements and cultural campaigns of significance. Since 1998 the choir, with the permission of Her Majesty the Queen, has been able to append the title Copenhagen Royal Chapel Choir to its name, and in accordance with the choir's traditions, this title is now its English name.

The choir continues to give concerts around the world and at various international music festivals. Its repertoire ranges from commissioned works by contemporary composers, such as Poul Ruders, Bernhard Lewkovitch, Per Nørgaard, Vagn Holmboe and Palle Mikkelborg, back to the earliest polyphony.

The choir has also taken part in productions for radio and television both in Denmark and in other countries, with CDs being made on labels such as EMI, Decca, Vanguard, Chandos, Kontrapunkt and Danica Records (OH).

Since 1991, Ebbe Munk has been the choir's artistic and administrative director.

In 2003, the Copenhagen Royal Chapel Choir was awarded the Liliane Bettencourt Choral Singing Prize in partnership with the Académie des beaux-arts. This award honors the choir's quality musical output in keeping with Scandinavian choral tradition.

== The school ==
The Copenhagen City Council provides an opportunity for all nine-year-old children with an interest and ability in singing to be admitted to the Choir School. Alongside their regular education, these children also receive specialized vocal training.
