= Sinfonietta (Larsson) =

Symphonic work in three movements by Lars-Erik Larsson

- by Lars-Erik Larsson
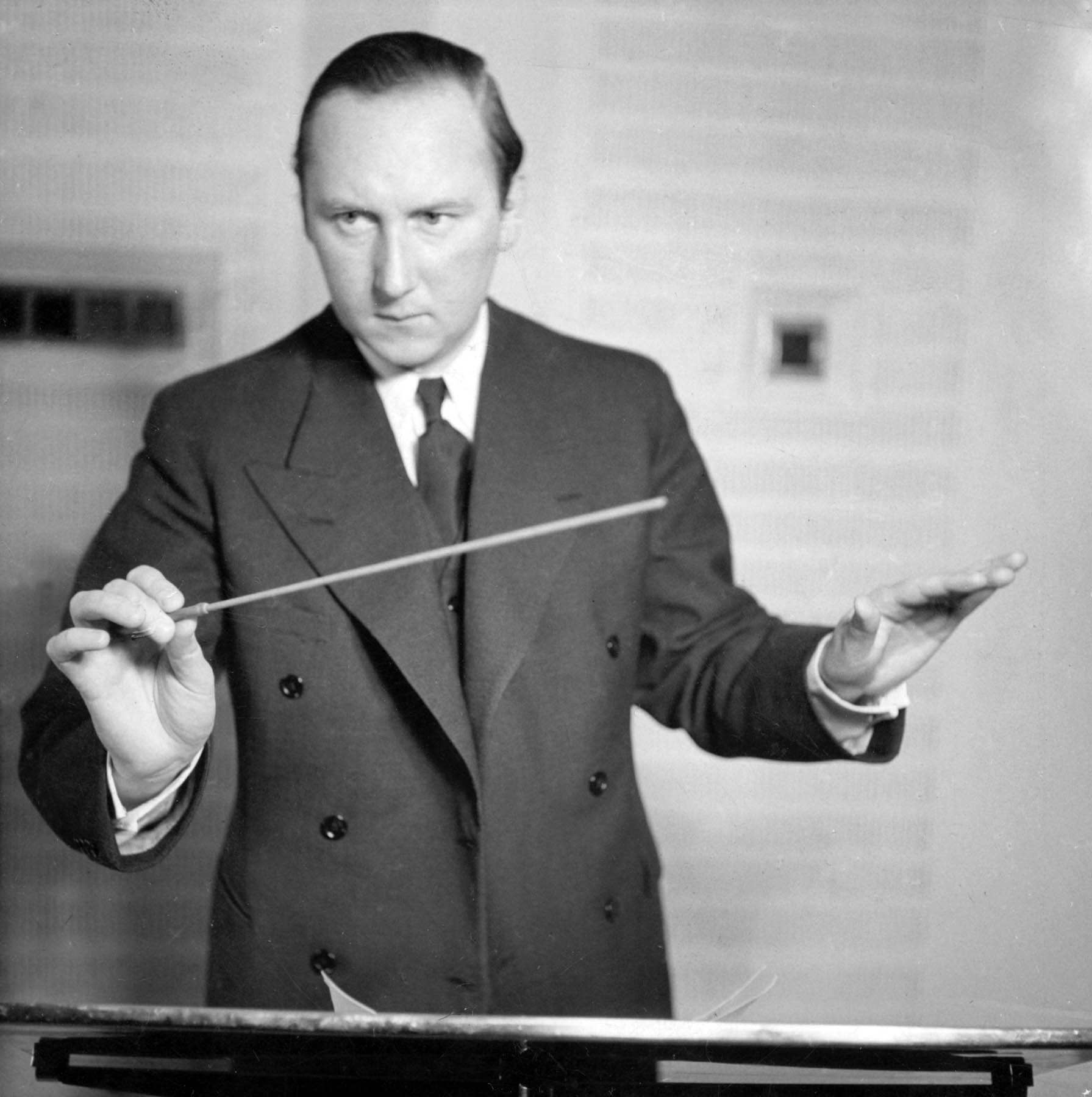
- The composer
- Opus: 10
- Composed: 1932
- Publisher: Universal Edition (1935)
- Duration: Approx. 20 minutes
- Movements: 3

Premiere
- Date: 14 December 1932
- Location: Gothenburg, Sweden
- Conductor: Tor Mann
- Performers: Gothenburg Orchestral Society

The Sinfonietta in C major, Op. 10, is a three-movement composition for string orchestra written in 1932 by the Swedish composer Lars-Erik Larsson. The piece premiered in Gothenburg on 14 December 1932 with Tor Mann conducting the Gothenburg Orchestral Society. A few years later, on 5 April 1934 at the International Society for Contemporary Music (ISCM) World Music Days in Florence, Hermann Scherchen conducted the Sinfonietta to considerable acclaim, scoring for Larsson the first international success of his career. In response, Universal Edition in Vienna signed a contract with the composer and published a number of his early works, among them the Sinfonietta, the Little Serenade (Liten serenad; Op. 12, 1934), and the Concert Overture No. 2 (Konsertouverture Nr. 2; Op. 13, 1934).

== Music ==
The Sinfonietta is in three movements. They are as follows:

1. Allegro
2. Largo—Presto—Largo
3. Allegro

The Sinfonietta is scored for violins, violas, cellos, and double basses. Universal Edition published the suite in 1935.

== Recordings ==
The sortable table below lists commercially available recordings of the Sinfonietta:

Conductor	Orchestra	Rec. (Note: Refers to the year in which the performers recorded the work; this may not be the same as the year in which the recording was first released to the general public.)	Time	Recording venue	Label	Ref.
Göran Nilson	Örebro Symphony Orchestra	1986	16:32	Örebro Concert Hall	Bluebell of Sweden	(Note: G. Nilson–Bluebell (ABCD 012) 1987)
Stefan Parkman	Sami Sinfonietta	2000	20:02	Radiohuset Studio 2	Musica Sveciae	(Note: S. Parkman–Musica Sveciae (PSCD 714) 2001)

== Notes, references, and sources ==
Notes

Sources

- Bergendal, Göran (2001). Lars-Erik Larsson: Konsertuvertyr Nr. 2 / En spelmans jordafärd / Sinfonietta / Det ljusa landet (CD booklet). Translated by Zetterqvist, Cynthia; Betteridge, Neil. Stefan Parkland & Sami Sinfonietta. Musica Svecae. p. 11–14. PSCD 714. OCLC 811456646
- Hedman, Frank (1987). Lars-Erik Larsson: Music for Strings (CD booklet). Göran Nilson & Örebro Symphony Orchestra. Bluebell of Sweden. p. 2–3. ABCD 012. OCLC 811642628
- Schlüren, Christoph (2002). "Lars-Erik Larsson: Sinfonietta in C op. 10". musikmph.de. Universal Edition.
- Schlüren, Christoph (2015). Lars-Erik Larsson: Symphony No. 2 / Variations, Op. 50 / Barococo Suite, Op. 64 (CD booklet). Translated by Robinson, J. Bradford. Andrew Manze & Helsingborg Symphony Orchestra. cpo. p. 14–20. 777 672–2. OCLC 965545444
