= 1932 in Nordic music =

The following is a list of notable events and compositions of the year 1932 in Nordic music.

== Events ==
- January – The Oslo Philharmonic Orchestra, conducted by Olav Kielland, devotes a concert to the works of Halfdan Jebe.
- unknown date
  - Armas Järnefelt becomes conductor and artistic director of the Finnish Opera in Helsinki.
  - Jørgen Bentzon and Finn Høffding work to establish public music schools in Denmark.
  - Swedish film star Zarah Leander marries journalist Vidar Forsell.

== New works ==
- Gunnar de Frumerie – Variations and Fugue
- Albert Henneberg – Festmarsch
- Lars-Erik Larsson – Sinfonietta

== Popular music ==
- Sten Axelson & Åke Söderblom – "Kan du vissla Johanna?"
- Evert Taube – "Calle Schewens vals"

== Film music ==
- Hugo Alfvén, Jean Sibelius & Evert Taube – Svarta rosor
- Kai Normann Andersen – Skal vi vædde en million?

== Musical films ==
- Odds 777, with music by Kai Normann Andersen & Dan Folke
- Studenter i Paris

== Births ==
- 5 February – Ketil Vea, Norwegian composer and music teacher (died 2015)
- 7 April – Rauno Lehtinen, Finnish bandleader and composer (died 2006)
- 29 May – Jan Malmsjö, Swedish singer and actor
- 13 July – Per Nørgård, Danish composer and music theorist (died 2025)
- 13 September – Bengt Hallberg, Swedish jazz pianist (died 2013)
- 18 October – Ritva Auvinen, Finnish opera singer (died 2026)
- 21 November – Pelle Gudmundsen-Holmgreen, Danish composer (died 2016)

== Deaths ==
- 24 December – Eyvind Alnæs, Norwegian pianist, organist and composer (born 1872)
- 25 December – Ernst Rolf, Swedish actor, singer and composer and musical revue artist (born 1891; pneumonia)

== See also ==
- 1932 in Denmark
- 1932 in Iceland
- 1932 in Norwegian music
- 1932 in Sweden
