= Konserthuset (disambiguation) =

Konserthuset is a Swedish word meaning The Concert Hall, and can refer to one of many concert halls in Sweden and the Swedish-speaking part Finland.

- Stockholm Concert Hall, located in central Stockholm, and the most likely intended meaning due to the building's prominence as the home of the Royal Stockholm Philharmonic Orchestra, and the venue of the Nobel Prize ceremony
- Gothenburg Concert Hall
- Malmö Concert Hall (disambiguation)
- Örebro Concert Hall
