= Little Serenade (Larsson) =

Suite by Lars-Erik Larsson

- Suite by Lars-Erik Larsson
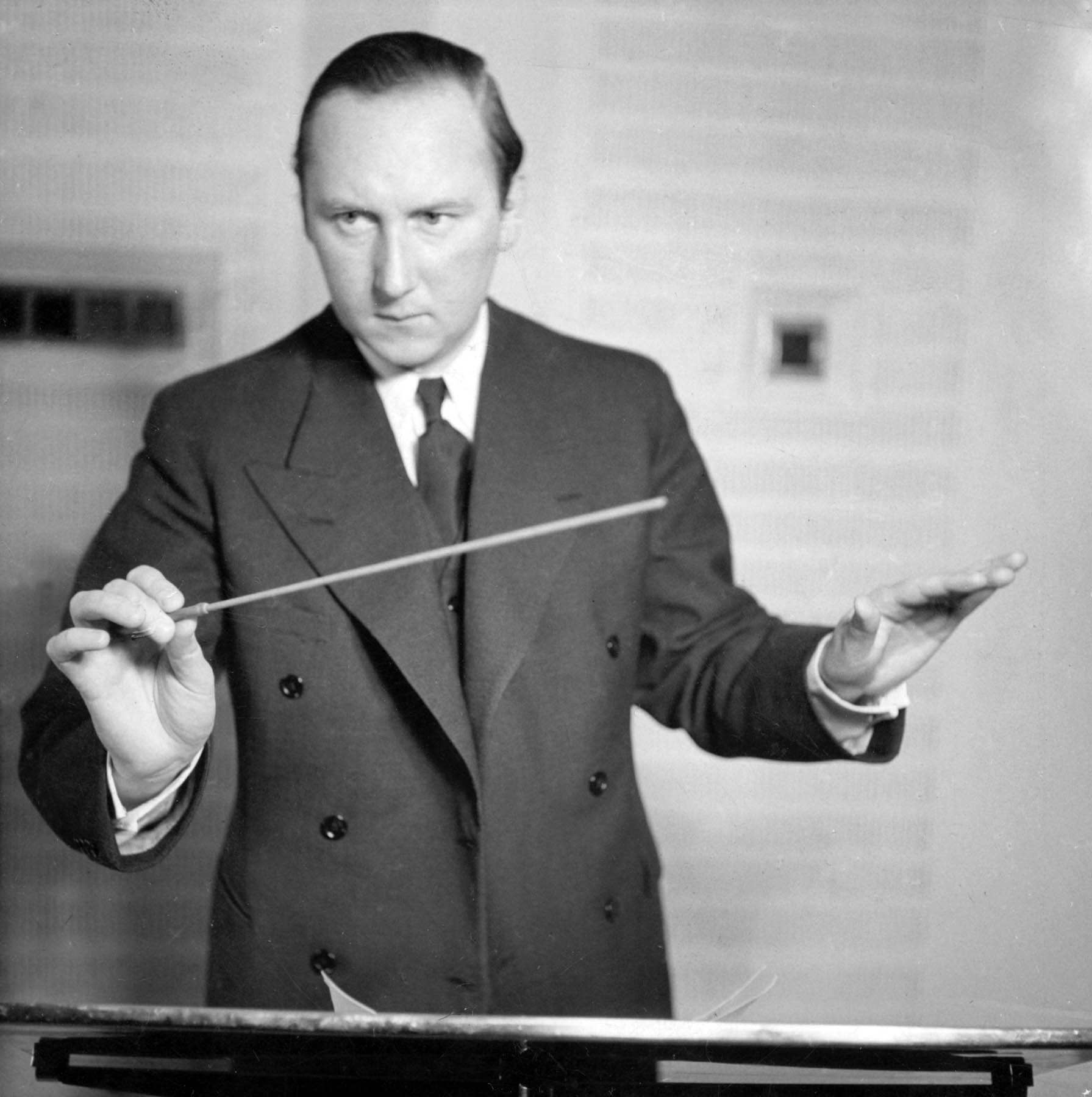
- The composer
- Native name: Liten serenad
- Opus: 12
- Composed: 1934
- Publisher: Universal Edition (1936)
- Duration: Approx. 11 minutes
- Movements: 4

Premiere
- Date: 7 March 1934
- Location: Gävle, Sweden
- Conductor: Lars-Erik Larsson
- Performers: Gävleborg Orchestral Society

The Little Serenade (in Swedish: Liten serenad), Op. 12, is a four-movement suite for string orchestra written in 1934 by Swedish composer Lars-Erik Larsson. The piece premiered in Gävle, Sweden, on 7 March 1934 with Larsson conducting the Gävleborg Orchestral Society.

On 5 April 1934 at the International Society for Contemporary Music (ISCM) World Music Days in Florence, Hermann Scherchen conducted Larsson's Sinfonietta to considerable acclaim, scoring for the composer the first international success of his career. In response, Universal Edition in Vienna signed a contract with the composer and published a number of his early works, among them the Sinfonietta, the Little Serenade, and the Concert Overture No. 2 (Konsertouverture Nr. 2; Op. 13, 1934).

== Music ==
The Little Serenade, which lasts about 11 minutes, is in four movements. They are as follows:

1. Allegro
2. Adagio cantabile
3. Allegro vivace
4. Allegro

The Sinfonietta is scored for violins, violas, cellos, and double basses. Universal Edition published the suite in 1936.

== Recordings ==
The sortable table below lists commercially available recordings of the Little Serenade:

No.	Conductor	Orchestra	Rec. (Note: Refers to the year in which the performers recorded the work; this may not be the same as the year in which the recording was first released to the general public.)	Time	Recording venue	Label	Ref.
1	Leo Berlin (Note: Leo Berlin is the concertmaster; no conductor is listed.)	Stockholm Philharmonic Chamber Ensemble	1965	10:18	Europafilm studio	Swedish Society Discofil	(Note: L. Berlin–Swedish Society (SCD 1051) 1997)
2	Esa-Pekka Salonen	Stockholm Sinfonietta	1984	11:10	Petrus Church	BIS	(Note: E. Salonen–BIS (CD–285) 1984)
3	Göran Nilson	Örebro Symphony Orchestra	1986	10:09	Örebro Concert Hall	Bluebell of Sweden	(Note: G. Nilson–Bluebell (ABCD 012) 1987)
4	Wojciech Rajski	Musica Vitae (1)	1988	10:58	Furuby Church	BIS	(Note: W. Rajski–BIS (CD–460) 1990)
5	Petri Sakari	Musica Vitae (2)	1990	11:01	St John's, Smith Square	Chamber Sound	(Note: P. Sakari–Chamber Sound (CD 9102) 1991)
6	Petter Sundkvist	Swedish Chamber Orchestra	1995	10:49	Örebro Concert Hall	Naxos	(Note: P. Sundkvist–Naxos (8.553715) 2000)
7	Karl-Ove Mannberg	The Berg Summer Ensemble	1999	10:28	Ovikens New Church	Bluebell of Sweden	(Note: K. Mannberg–Bluebell (ABCD 3008) 1999)
8	Christopher Warren-Green	Jönköping Sinfonietta	2002	10:34	Jönköping Concert Hall	Intim Musik	(Note: C. Warren-Green–Intim Musik (IMCD 082) 2003)
9	Quim Termens	Orquestra de Cambra Terrassa 48	2007	11:04	L'Auditori Municipal de Terrassa	Ars Harmonica	(Note: Q. Termens–Ars Harmonica (AH184) 2007)
10	Juha Kangas	Ostrobothnian Chamber Orchestra	2014	10:21	Snellmann Hall, Kokkola	Alba Records	(Note: J. Kangas–Alba (ABCD380) 2015)

== Notes, references, and sources ==
Notes

Sources

- Schlüren, Christoph (2002). "Lars-Erik Larsson: Liten Serenad (Little Serenade) in G op. 12 for String Orchestra". musikmph.de. Universal Edition.
- Schlüren, Christoph (2015). Lars-Erik Larsson: Symphony No. 2 / Variations, Op. 50 / Barococo Suite, Op. 64 (CD booklet). Translated by Robinson, J. Bradford. Andrew Manze & Helsingborg Symphony Orchestra. cpo. p. 14–20. 777 672–2. OCLC 965545444
