= Hallgrímur Helgason (composer) =

Hallgrímur Helgason (November 3, 1914 – September 18, 1994) was an Icelandic composer, violinist, musicologist, conductor, and music educator.

== Life and career ==
Hallgrímur Helgason was born in Eyrarbakki, Iceland, on November 3, 1914. After completing his undergraduate studies in violin at the Reykjavík College of Music in 1933, he pursued further studies at the Royal Danish Academy of Music (1935) and in both music composition and violin at the Leipzig Conservatory (1936–1939). He then studied musicology at Leipzig University. He continued graduate studies in violin and composition at the Zurich Conservatory (merged into the Zurich University of the Arts in 2007) where he graduated in 1949. In 1954 he earned a doctorate in musicology from the University of Zürich.

Helgason was the assistant director of music for RÚV from 1959 through 1966. He was a professor of music at the University of Saskatchewan from 1966 through 1974 and a docent of liturgical music at the University of Iceland from 1974 through 1984. He wrote extensively on Icelandic musical heritage, and his books were a substantial contribution to the cultivation of musicology in Iceland. His compositions weaved Icelandic folk melodies in Western classical music, sometimes with dense chromaticism, but more often with a more conservative style.

Helgason died on September 18, 1994.
