= Hjálmar H. Ragnarsson =

Icelandic composer (1952–2026)

- Born: Hjálmar Helgi Ragnarsson; 23 September 1952; Ísafjörður, Iceland
- Died: 13 March 2026 (aged 73)
- Education: Reykjavík College; Reykjavík School of Music; Utrecht University; Cornell University
- Occupations: Composer; music theorist; Rector; pianist
- Years active: 1980–2026
- Organizations: Iceland Symphony Orchestra; Reykjavík Chamber Orchestra; Iceland University of the Arts

Hjálmar Helgi Ragnarsson (23 September 1952 – 13 March 2026) was an Icelandic composer, music theorist, and rector. He was considered among the leading Icelandic composers of his generation, and made a contribution to Icelandic cultural life through his presidency of the Federation of Icelandic Artists, and as Rector of the Iceland University of the Arts.

== Life and career ==
Hjálmar was born in Ísafjörður in northwestern Iceland on 23 September 1952, the son of Ragnar H. Ragnar, dean of the local music school, and Sigríður Jónsdóttir. He began piano studies with his father at age six and later continued his studies at the Reykjavík College and the Reykjavík School of Music. He completed a BA at Brandeis University in 1974 and studied electronic music at the Institute of Sonology (Utrecht University) in 1976–1977. In 1980, he completed an MFA in composition and music theory at Cornell University.

Following his return to Iceland, Hjálmar was an active composer and teacher. He was a teacher at the Reykjavík College of Music from 1980 to 1988 and was the first Rector of the Iceland University of the Arts, serving for three terms (1998–2013). He was Chairman of the Icelandic Society of Composers (1988–1992), and President of the Federation of Icelandic Artists (Bandalag íslenskra listamanna) from 1991 to 1998. He received various honours for his work, including Knight of the Order of the Falcon by the President of Iceland (1996), the Gríma Award for best theater score (2003 and 2018) and Honorary Artist of his home town of Kópavogur (2009). In 2016, he was awarded the first honorary doctorate from the Iceland University of the Arts. In 2025, he was a recipient of the Honorary Award of STEF, the Composers' Rights Society of Iceland.

Hjálmar wrote a large number of scores, ranging from shorter solo compositions to large-scale symphonic works, as well as lieder, choral pieces, musicals, and opera. Several of his early mature works can be seen as a reaction against the prevailing modernist aesthetic, for example his Five Preludes for piano, where he cultivated a post-Romantic style with nods to Chopin and Rachmaninoff. In another substantial work, his Mass for a cappella choir, he goes against the tradition of setting the Latin text, for example with a Kyrie that he has described as a "distress call", a calm and "humble" Gloria, and a Credo characterized by doubt rather than firm belief.

He was prolific as a composer of incidental music and film scores, the former including Yerma (García Lorca, 1987), The House of Bernarda Alba (García Lorca, 1989), and Peer Gynt (Ibsen, 1991), all for the National Theater of Iceland, and Death of a Salesman (Miller, 2002) for the Reykjavík City Theater. Among other theatrical works are the chamber opera Rhodymenia Palmata (1992), the ballet score Rauður þráður (Red Thread, 1989), and the children's operas Kalli og sælgætisgerðin (Charlie and the Chocolate Factory, 1993) and Sónata (1994).

Hjálmar wrote on the Icelandic composer Jón Leifs, and his research paved the way for worldwide recognition of Leifs' music, including an ongoing series of recordings on the Swedish BIS Records label. The influence of Leifs can be heard in several of Hjálmar's works, including his choral Ave Maria and the Organ Concerto, which was intended as an homage to Leifs' own Organ Concerto. He co-wrote the screenplay and was musical advisor for the film Tár úr steini (Tears of Stone, 1995), a fictionalised account of Leifs' life and career in Germany. He also wrote the music for the film Kaldaljós (Cold Light, 2004).

His works have been performed by ensembles, including the Iceland Symphony Orchestra, the Reykjavík Chamber Orchestra, and the Choir of Clare College, Cambridge. His works have received a positive reaction in international media such as Gramophone, where Andrew Mellor called his Ave Maria a "stunning ... beautiful, integral piece," while Guy Rickards described the Six Songs on Poems by Stefán Hörður Grímsson as "a tour de force of vocal expression traversing between the tragic and the sardonic."

Hjálmar died of cancer on 13 March 2026, at the age of 73.

== Selected works ==
Hjálmar's works are published by Iceland Music:

- Four Icelandic folk songs, arr. for mixed choir (1982)
- Kvöldvísur um sumarmál (April Night Song) for mixed choir / text: Stefán Hörður Grímsson (1984)
- Ave Maria for mixed choir (1985)
- Five Preludes for piano (1985)
- Yerma, incidental music (1987)
- Mass for choir a cappella (1982–1989)
- Spjótalög (Spear-thrusts) for orchestra (1989)
- Adagio for string sextet (1990)
- Peer Gynt (Pétur Gautur), incidental music (1991)
- Ástarljóð mitt (My Love Song) for soprano and piano / text: Else Lasker-Schüler, trans. Hannes Pétursson (1991)
- Rhodymenia Palmata, chamber opera / text: Halldór Laxness (1992)
- Organ Concerto (1997)
- Vocalise for mezzo-soprano, violin, and piano (1998)
- Í svarthvítu (In Black and White) for orchestra (2000)
- Yfir heiðan morgun (Across a Cloudless Morning) for solo cello and orchestra (2009)
- Partita for solo violin (2020)
- Nocturne for electronics, soprano, and alto flute (1977/2022)
- Stilla (Calm) for piano left hand (2022)

== Selected recordings ==
- Kvöldvísur um sumarmál. Kveðið í bjargi, Icelandic Choral Music. The Hamrahlíð Choir, cond. Þorgerður Ingólfsdóttir. Iceland Music Information Center, 1988.
- In Black and White for solo flute. To Manuela. Icelandic Solo Flute Music. Manuela Wiesler, flute. BIS, 1989.
- Mass and other choral works. Hljómeyki, cond. Hjálmar H. Ragnarsson. Iceland Music Information Center, 1991.
- Four Icelandic folk songs (arr.). Íslensk þjóðlög/Icelandic Folk Songs. The Hamrahlíð Choir, cond. Þorgerður Ingólfsdóttir. Iceland Music Information Center, 1993.
- Sónata, "fairy tale opera" for two singers, flute, and harpsichord. Japis, 1995.
- Three Songs from Peer Gynt. Icelandic Songs. Auður Gunnarsdóttir, soprano, Jónas Ingimundarson, piano. Japis, 1999.
- Kvöldvísur um sumarmál. Vorkvæði um Ísland. The Hamrahlíð Choir, cond. Þorgerður Ingólfsdóttir. Smekkleysa, 2002.
- Ave Maria. Ljósið þitt lýsi mér. Hallgrímskirkja Motet Choir, cond. Hörður Áskelsson. Mótettukórinn, 2008.
- Adagio; Vocalise; Tengsl; Movement for string quartet, Six Songs. Reykjavík Chamber Orchestra. Smekkleysa, 2013.
- Ástarljóð mitt; Three Songs from Peer Gynt. Í ást sólar. Hallveig Rúnarsdóttir, soprano, Árni Heimir Ingólfsson, piano. Smekkleysa, 2014.
- Ave Maria. Ice Land: The Eternal Music. Choir of Clare College, Cambridge, dir. Graham Ross. Harmonia Mundi, 2022.
- Partita. De Lumine. Sif Margrét Tulinius, violin. Ulysses Arts, 2024.
- Stilla. Nordlicht. Margarita Höhenrieder, piano, Solo Musica 2024.
