= 1929 in Nordic music =

The following is a list of notable events and compositions of the year 1929 in Nordic music.

== Events ==
- 30 January – Swedish pianist Stina Sundell makes her professional debut in Stockholm.
- July – During rehearsals for Selim Palmgren's new cantata, Turun lilja ("Lily of Turku"), written to celebrate Turku's 700th anniversary, in Turku Cathedral, soprano Maikki Palmgren collapses and suffers an aneurysm
- 5 September – Carl Fischer Music returns piano and violin pieces submitted by Jean Sibelius on the grounds that "in view of the extremely unfortunate constellation in the music publishing field in the United States, it seems to us inadvisable at the present time to publish compositions of the high standard which you have submitted to us. The market is very unfavorable for this class of music..."
- unknown date – As conductor and sometimes performer, Gunnar Malmström records twenty-five 78-rpm discs for the Edison Bell Radio company, including his own arrangements of Swedish folk songs and others’ compositions.

== New works ==
- Kurt Atterberg – Symphonic Poem Älven, Op. 33
- Carl Nielsen – Tre Motetter
- Jean Sibelius
  - Five Esquisses, Op. 114, for piano
  - Suite for Violin and String Orchestra

== Popular music ==
- Hjalmar Gullberg & Bengt Hjelmqvist – "Skånska slott och herresäten"
- Väinö Siikaniemi – "Emma"
- Evert Taube – "Balladen om briggen "Blue Bird" av Hull"

== Film music ==
- Sonja Sahlberg – Say It with Music (Säg det i toner)

== Births ==
- 14 April – Paavo Berglund, Finnish violinist and conductor (died 2012)
- 7 November – Benny Andersen, Danish author, poet, pianist and composer (died 2018)

== Deaths ==
- 11 January – Elfrida Andrée, Swedish organist, composer and conductor (born 1841)
- 30 April – Birger Sjöberg, Swedish poet and songwriter (born 1885)
- 4 July – Maikki Järnefelt, Finnish operatic soprano and singing teacher, wife of Selim Palmgren and ex-wife of Armas Järnefelt (born 1871)
- 22 July – Bror Beckman, Swedish composer (born 1866)
- 23 November – Arvid Kleven, Norwegian flautist and composer (born 1899)

== See also ==
- 1929 in Denmark
- 1929 in Iceland
- 1929 in Norwegian music
- 1929 in Sweden
