= Páll Ísólfsson =

Icelandic organist, conductor and composer

Páll Ísólfsson (12 October 1893 – 23 November 1974) was an Icelandic organist, composer, pianist, conductor, and school director. He was one of the first Icelanders to study music abroad and is seen as one of the most influential Icelandic musicians in the first half of the twentieth century. Through his work as performer, composer, conductor, and the first director of the Reykjavík School of Music, he played a large part in creating a culture of Western classical music in Iceland.

== Life and career ==
Páll Ísólfsson was born in Stokkseyri in southern Iceland on 12 October 1893, the son of the composer, organist, and inventor Ísólfur Pálsson and his wife Þuríður Bjarnadóttir. Ísólfsson left the small town for Reykjavík at age 15, living with his uncle, Jón Pálsson, and his wife, Anna S. Adólfsdóttir. Although Ísólfsson had initially intended to study printing, his uncle decided to pay for his organ studies in Germany, and thus Ísólfsson left for Leipzig in autumn 1913. There, he studied at the Leipzig Conservatory with the renowned organist Karl Straube, making excellent progress, and often substituting for his teacher at the St. Thomas Church. It was during a break from his studies, while in Reykjavík in March 1916, that Ísólfsson gave his first public concert at Reykjavík Cathedral, a landmark event in the town's concert life. In 1924–25, Ísólfsson also studied briefly with Joseph Bonnet in Paris.

Upon his return to Iceland, Ísólfsson assumed a central role in the country's musical life. He was organist at the Free Church (Fríkirkjan) from 1926–1939 and at the Reykjavík Cathedral from 1939–1968. Among his key performances as a conductor was a performance of Haydn's The Creation in Reykjavík in 1939, with the Reykjavík Music Society Choir and Orchestra, which was the first time a complete oratorio was performed in Iceland. He also conducted at Iceland's Independence Festival at Þingvellir in 1944, celebrating the country's independence from Denmark. He was the first director of music at Iceland National Radio (Ríkisútvarpið), founded in 1930, and the first director of the Reykjavík School of Music (Tónlistarskólinn í Reykjavík), also founded in 1930.

Although Ísólfsson only composed when he had free time or was specially commissioned, his output contains works that were hugely popular in their day. These include his Althingi Festival Cantata, which won a competition for a new work to be performed at the millennial celebrations of the Icelandic Althingi (Parliament), as well as his incidental music to Gullna hliðið (The Golden Gate), a play by the celebrated poet Davíð Stefánsson. The Máríuvers (A Hymn to the Virgin) from the latter is still among his most performed songs. Among his last compositions were a large-scale set of variations on a song by his father (Variations on a Theme by Ísólfur Pálsson), and a song cycle to texts from the Song of Songs.

Ísólfsson received many awards and honors for his contribution to music. He was awarded four stages of the Icelandic Order of the Falcon: Knight's Cross (1940), Knight Grand Cross (1955), Knight Grand Cross with Star (1967), and Great Cross (Stórkross, 1969). He was awarded an honorary doctorate from University of Oslo in 1945 and was elected a member of the Royal Swedish Music Academy in 1954. In his last years, Ísólfsson suffered from Parkinson's disease.

== Main works ==
- Þrjú píanóstykki (Three Piano Pieces) op. 5 (pub. 1934).
- Passacaglia for organ, ca. 1930 (also arranged for orchestra).
- Chaconne on a theme from Þorlákstíðir, for organ, ca. 1930 (also arranged for orchestra).
- Alþingishátíðarkantata (Althing Festival Cantata) for male choir, mixed choir, and orchestra, 1930.
- Gullna hliðið (The Golden Gate), incidental music, 1941.
- Veislan á Sólhaugum (The Feast at Solhaug), incidental music, 1943.
- Myndabók Jónasar Hallgrímssonar (The Picture-Book of Jónas Hallgrímsson), incidental music, 1945.
- Skálholtskantata (Skálholt Cantata) for male choir, mixed choir, and orchestra, 1958.
- Tilbrigði um stef eftir Ísólf Pálsson (Variations on a Theme by Ísólfur Pálsson) for piano, 1964.
- Úr Ljóðaljóðum (From the Song of Songs) for soprano and piano, 1971.

== Selected recordings ==
- Páll Ísólfsson: Aldarminning 1993. Páll Ísólfsson, organ. Alda Music, 1993.
- Páll Ísólfsson: Festival March and Festival Overture. Iceland Symphony Orchestra, cond. Petri Sakari. Chandos, 1993.
- Páll Ísólfsson: Svipmyndir og Glettur. Örn Magnússon, piano. Icelandic Music Information Center, 1997.
- Páll Ísólfsson: Complete Original Piano Music. Nína Margrét Grímsdóttir, piano. BIS, 2001.
- Páll Ísólfsson: Organ Works. Björn Steinar Sólbergsson, organ. Skálholtsútgáfan, 2004.
- Páll Ísólfsson: Úr Ljóðaljóðum (From the Song of Songs). Í ást sólar. Hallveig Rúnarsdóttir, soprano, Árni Heimir Ingólfsson, piano. Smekkleysa, 2014.
- Icelandic Works for the Stage. Iceland Symphony Orchestra, cond. Rumon Gamba. Chandos, 2023.

== Bibliography ==
- Jón Þórarinsson: Páll Ísólfsson. Helgafell, 1963.
- Jón Þórarinsson: "Páll Ísólfsson." Andvari 104 (1979): 3-32.
- Árni Heimir Ingólfsson: "Páll Ísólfsson." The New Grove Dictionary of Music and Musicians (London: Macmillan, 2001), 12: 616–617.
- Árni Heimir Ingólfsson: "Páll Ísólfsson: Organ Works." CD liner notes, Skálholtsútgáfan, 2004.
- Nína Margrét Grímsdóttir: "The Piano Works of Páll Ísólfsson: A Diverse Collection." DMA Thesis, City University of New York, 2010.
- Árni Heimir Ingólfsson: Jón Leifs and the Musical Invention of Iceland. Indiana University Press, 2019. ISBN 9780253044051.
