= 2013 in Nordic music =

The following is a list of notable events and releases that happened in Nordic music in 2013.

== Events ==
- 18 February – Norway's Bergen Philharmonic Orchestra appoints Edward Gardner as its next principal conductor, with effect from the 2015–2016 season.
- 18 March – Sweden's Helsingborg Symphony Orchestra appoints Stefan Solyom as its next chief conductor, with effect from the 2014–2015 season.

== New works ==
- Hans Abrahamsen – Let me tell you (soprano and orchestra)
- Pelle Gudmundsen-Holmgreen – Together or Not
- Aulis Sallinen – Baumgesang mit Epilog for Cello & Piano

== Film and television music ==
- Anna Jarvinen, Darya Pakarinen, Love Antell, Markus Fagervall, Mirella Hautala, Manskensorkestern, Hannu Kiviaho, Heikki Kiviaho, Harri Manty, Jukka Takalo – Finnish Blood Swedish Heart
- Atli Örvarsson – Hansel & Gretel: Witch Hunters

== Albums released ==
=== January ===
| Day | Album | Artist | Label | Notes | Ref. |
|---|---|---|---|---|---|
| 1 | Mors Principium Est | ...And Death Said Live | AFM Records | | |
| 25 | Convulse | Inner Evil | | | |
| 25 | Cult of Luna | Vertikal | | | |
| 25 | Koldbrann | Vertigo | | | |
| 25 | Jørn Lande | Symphonic (compilation) | | | |
| 25 | Stratovarius | Unbreakable | | EP | |

=== March ===
| Day | Album | Artist | Label | Notes | Ref. |
|---|---|---|---|---|---|
| 1 | Honningbarna | Verden Er Enkel | Virgin | | |
| 12 | Tine Thing Helseth | Tine | Warner Classics | | |

=== April ===
| Day | Album | Artist | Label | Notes | Ref. |
|---|---|---|---|---|---|
| 4 | Atomic | There's A Hole In The Mountain | Losen Records | | |
| 12 | Ketil Bjørnstad | La Notte | ECM Records | Produced by Manfred Eicher | |
| 12 | Motorpsycho and Reine Fiske | Still Life with Eggplant | Rune Grammofon | Produced by Bent Sæther | |
| 12 | Gjermund Titlestad | Map Of The World – Music For Guitar | Ponca Jazz Records | | |

=== May ===
| Day | Artist | Album | Label | Notes | Ref. |
|---|---|---|---|---|---|
| 10 | Arckanum | Fenris Kindir | Season of Mist | | |
| 13 | Basshunter | Calling Time | Gallo Record Company | | |
| 17 | Blood Red Throne | Blood Red Throne | Sevared Records | | |
| 17 | Gothminister | Utopia | AFM Records | | |

=== June ===
| Day | Album | Artist | Label | Notes | Ref. |
|---|---|---|---|---|---|
| 14 | Terje Rypdal with The Hilliard Ensemble | Melodic Warrior | ECM | Produced by Manfred Eicher | |
| 25 | Lage Lund, Orlando le Fleming, Will Vinson | OWL Trio | Losen | | |

=== July ===
| Day | Album | Artist | Label | Notes | Ref. |
|---|---|---|---|---|---|
| 27 | Mercenary | Through Our Darkest Days | NoiseArt Records | Only album to feature Peter Mathiesen as drummer | |

=== September ===
| Day | Album | Artist | Label | Notes | Ref. |
|---|---|---|---|---|---|
| 6 | Frida Ånnevik | Ville Ord | Grappa | Recipient of the Spellemannprisen lyricist award | |
| 9 | Duplex | Duolia | NorCD | | |
| 9 | Duplex | Sketches of ... | NorCD | | |
| 11 | Mopti | Logic | Ocean Sound Recordings | | |
| 20 | Andrea Kvintett | Russian Dream | NorCD | | |
| 20 | The Forester | Susanna and Ensemble neoN | SusannaSonata | Produced by Deathprod and Susanna | |

=== October ===
| Day | Album | Artist | Label | Notes | Ref. |
|---|---|---|---|---|---|
| 1 | Arve Henriksen | Places of Worship | Rune Grammofon | | |
| 8 | Pixel | We Are All Small Pixels | Cuneiform Records | | |
| 18 | Karl Seglem | NyeSongar.no | NorCD | | |
| 25 | Geir Lysne | New Circle | ACT Music | | |

=== November ===
| Day | Album | Artist | Label | Notes | Ref. |
|---|---|---|---|---|---|
| 29 | Daniel Herskedal | Dagane | NorCD | | |

=== December ===
| Day | Album | Artist | Label | Notes | Ref. |
|---|---|---|---|---|---|
| 18 | Arvingarna | Änglar och en massa kärlek | Sony Music | 2014 Guldklaven Award winner | |
| 18 | Skálmöld and the Iceland Symphony Orchestra | Skálmöld & Sinfóníuhljómsveit Íslands (CD/DVD) | Sena | Live album | |

== Deaths ==
- 14 January – Morten Mølster, Norwegian rock guitarist, age unknown
- 25 January – Aase Nordmo Løvberg, Norwegian opera singer, 89
- 16 February – Eric Ericson, Swedish conductor, 94
- 17 April – Yngve Moe, Norwegian jazz and rock bass guitarist, 55 (drowning)
- 20 May – Anders Eliasson, Swedish composer, 66
- 26 June – Henrik Otto Donner, Finnish composer and music industry executive, 73
- 2 July – Bengt Hallberg, jazz pianist, arranger and composer, 80 (born 1932)
- 6 December – Tom Krause, Finnish opera singer, 79 (born 1934)
- 21 December – Lars Edlund, Swedish organist and composer, 91
