= 1934 in Nordic music =

The following is a list of notable events and compositions of the year 1934 in Nordic music.

== Events ==
- 4 June – Georg Schnéevoigt and the Finnish National Orchestra record Sibelius's Symphony No. 4. A few days later they make the first commercial recording of Sibelius's Symphony No. 6, for HMV in London.
- August – Jón Leifs and his family travel to Berlin to get medical treatment for his daughter Snót.
- 14 August – Dag Wirén, having completed his studies in Paris, marries cellist Noel Franks.
- 12 November – Eugen Malmstén, brother of George, starts Rytmi-Pojat (The Rhythm Boys), the first modern big band in Finland.
- unknown date
  - Georg Malmstén makes his first recordings, intended for children, based on the adventures of a character called "Mikki Hiiri". His sister, Greta, also performed on these.
  - Soprano Edith Oldrup makes her first appearance with Denmark's Operaakademiet, as Micaëla in Carmen.

== New works ==
- Ole Hjellemo – Fire springleiker og en vals fra Gudbrandsdalen
- Herman David Koppel
  - Capriccio for Violin and Orchestra
  - Suite for Klavier [Suite for Piano], Op. 21
- Lars-Erik Larsson – Little Serenade
- Harald Sæverud – Canto Ostinato

== Popular music ==
- Svante Pettersson – "Gotländsk sommarnatt"

== Film music ==
- Kai Normann Andersen – Nøddebo Præstegård
- Jules Sylvain – En bröllopsnatt på Stjärnehov

== Births ==
- 11 January – Egil Johansen, Norwegian-Swedish jazz drummer, composer and teacher (died 1998)
- 24 January – Kåre Grøttum, Norwegian jazz musician, arranger and composer
- 4 September – Otto Brandenburg, Danish musician, singer and actor (died 2007)
- 18 October – Berit Lindholm, Swedish operatic soprano (died 2023)
- 22 November – Östen Warnerbring, Swedish singer and composer (died 2006)
- 24 November – Sven-Bertil Taube, Swedish actor and singer, son of Evert Taube (died 2022)

== Deaths ==
- 4 October – Henri Marteau, French composer, advocate of Swedish music (born 1874)
- 21 November – Mon Schjelderup, Norwegian composer and pianist (born 1870)

== See also ==
- 1934 in Denmark
- 1934 in Iceland
- 1934 in Norwegian music
- 1934 in Sweden
