= Tre Motetter =

Composition for unaccompanied choir by Carl Nielsen

- by Carl Nielsen
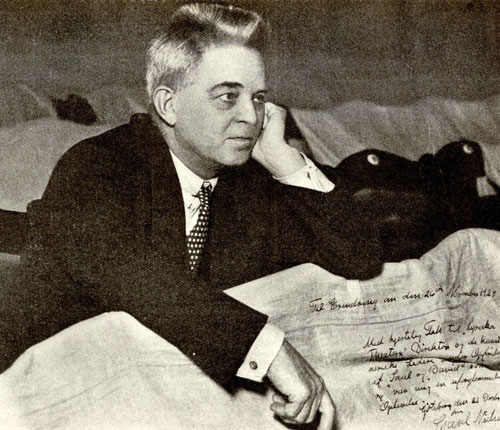
- The composer in 1928
- Catalogue: FS 139
- Opus: 55
- Form: Motets
- Text: Psalms 38:9; Psalms 23:1-2; Psalms 31:21
- Language: Latin
- Composed: 1929
- Dedication: Mogens Wöldike and the Palestrina choir
- Performed: 11 April 1930: Copenhagen
- Scoring: SATB choir

Tre Motetter (Three Motets), FS 139, Op. 55, is a composition for unaccompanied choir by Carl Nielsen. It is a setting of three quotations in Latin from different psalms chosen by the composer and his wife Anne Marie Carl-Nielsen. The three motets, Afflictus sum, Dominus regit me and Benedictus Dominus were first performed on 11 April 1930 at the Ny Carlsberg Glyptotek by Mogens Wöldike and the Palestrina choir, to whom they are dedicated. Among the composer's last works, they were published in 1931 by the Skandinavisk Musikforlag in Copenhagen.

== History and words ==
Nielsen listened in 1928 to a concert of a cappella Renaissance polyphony conducted by Mogens Wöldike. The conductor asked Nielsen, his former teacher, to compose something for the group, and made suggestions for texts. Instead, Nielsen and his wife Anne-Marie selected sections from different psalms. Nielsen composed the works from April to August 1929 while studying vocal polyphonic music by Renaissance composers.

"Afflictus sum" is the ninth verse of Psalm 38 (Psalm 37 in the Vulgate), translated in the King James Version: "Lord, all my desire is before thee; and my groaning is not hid from thee." (Psalms 38:9). "Dominus regit me" (The lord leads me), known as: The Lord is my shepherd) are the first two verses of Psalm 23 (Psalm 22 in the Vulgate), reading in the KJ translation: "The Lord is my shepherd; I shall not want. He maketh me to lie down in green pastures: he leadeth me beside the still waters." (Psalms 23:1-2). "Benedictus Dominus" is the 21st verse of Psalm 31 (the 22nd verse of Psalm 30 in the Vulgate), in the KJ version: "Blessed be the Lord: for he hath shewed me his marvellous kindness in a strong city." (Psalms 31:21).

The three motets were first performed on 11 April 1930 at the Ny Carlsberg Glyptotek by Mogens Wöldike and the Palestrina choir. They were published in 1931 by the Skandinavisk Musikforlag in Copenhagen.

== Music ==
The motets are set for an a cappella choir SATB of four to five voices. The first is scored for only the lower voices (ATTB), the central one for SATB, the last one uses a divided soprano. Nielsen wrote the music first, to reflect the mood of the Biblical quotations, adding the texts later. Dennis Shrock, who named the style "Neo-Renaissance", notes in Choral Repertoire:

Clearly modeled on the works of Palestrina, each motet is constructed of successive points of imitation, with occasional and brief phrases of homophony that interrupt the texture of long polyphonic phrases.

The handwritten parts for the first performance in 1930 are lost, and scholars debate if several markings regarding dynamics and phrasing, which were added by the conductor Mogens Wöldike and appear in the first printed edition, were approved by the composer. Nielsen was pleased with the motets, both his approach and the works themselves.

== Sources ==
- 3 Motets, Op.55: Scores at the International Music Score Library Project
