= Gertrud Maria Mell =

Swedish composer and choir director

Gertrud Maria Mell (15 August 1947 – 30 June 2016), as a singer sometimes simply Maria Mell, was a Swedish composer, musician and sea captain. She worked as a music teacher, served as a church organist and cantor, and directed four choirs. Mell began composing in 1961, creating four symphonies, various classical pieces as well as pop music.

== Biography ==
Born on 15 August 1947 in Ed, Dalsland, in south-western Sweden, Gertrud Maria Mell was the daughter of Torsten Mell, a station inspector, and Iris Olofson. Between 1965 and 1967, she studied instrumentation and conducting at the Lund Musik Conservatory, graduating as an organist and cantor in 1967 and as a church choir director in 1968. In addition to music, she studied seafaring, qualifying as a skipper (1971), ship's mechanic (1979) and sea captain (1981).

Mell was an organist in Töftedal Church (1967–1976) as well as a music teacher in Ed (1969–1971) and in Bengtsfors (1972–1976). During that period she also gave private lessons in piano and voice. From 1976, she worked as a sailor on a Transatlantic ship, serving as a captain in 1982. In 1982, she was appointed head musician at the Pater Noster Church in Gothenburg.

Active as a conductor from 1961, she wrote four symphonies, a string quartet, chamber music, choral works, organ pieces, songs, symphonic poems as well as pop and dance music.

Mell made at least two recordings: an LP titled Mell (1971) and Mermaid, an EP (1977), with the songs "Avsked" and "Hav". Here the artist's name is given simply as Maria Mell.

Gertrud Maria Mell died on 30 June 2016.
