= Terje Tysland =

Norwegian singer and songwriter

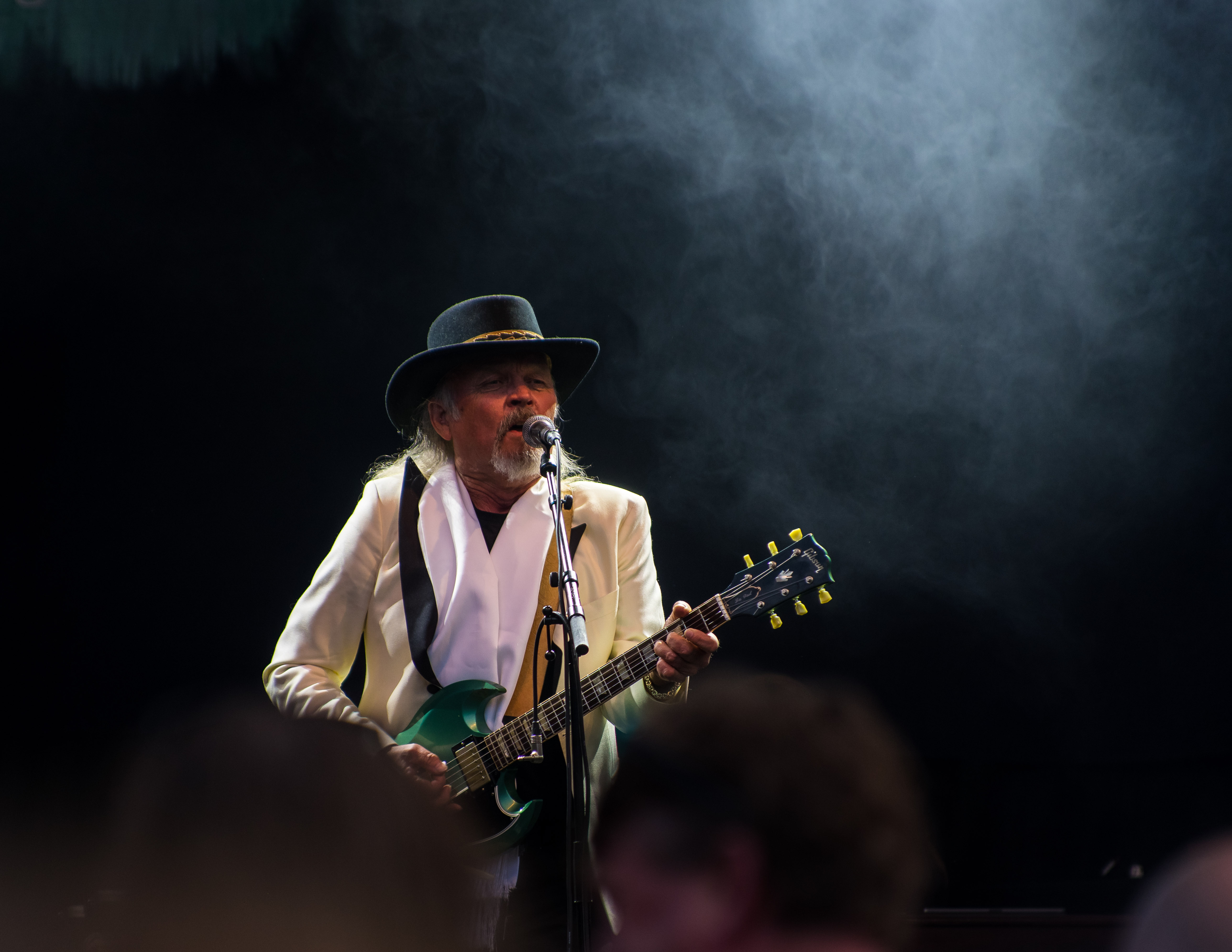
- Terje Tysland
- Born: 14 April 1951 (age 75); Namsos, Norway
- Occupations: Singer; Songwriter; Guitarist; Accordion player
- Known for: "Ringdans" "Heile livet"

Terje Tysland (born 14 April 1951) is a Norwegian singer, songwriter, guitarist and accordion player.

== Life and career ==
Tysland was born in Namsos on 14 April 1951. From 1971 to 1975 he was member of the rock group Prudence, which was led by Åge Aleksandersen. His first solo album was Stakkars klovn from 1977, and he had a musical breakthrough with the album Mytji arti from 1978. His song "Ringdans" reached number one position on the hit list Norsktoppen in 1981. The album Gutta på by'n from 1987 was a commercial success, and includes the country duo "Heile livet" with Claudia Scott. His next albums include Kainn æ få lov from 1988, Værra me’ mæ hjæm from 1990, the live album Best i levende live from 1990 and Vik fra mæ! from 1992. The album Fullar enn fullmånen from 1993 was a collaboration with the hard rock band Clawfinger, and on Hurra for mæ from 1995 he collaborated with Oppdal Spellemannslag. 1996 saw the appearance of the collection album For ett mas! Det beste – på godt og vondt. Later albums include Ein runde te (1997), Din jævel! (2000), the collection album 25 år med gitter & stas (2002), and Det goe’ liv (2004). His album Lidderli gla (2009) contains political comments on issues such as freedom of speech and health care services.

He celebrated his 75th anniversary in April 2026, still active as artist and giving more than fifty annual concert performances.
