= Bernhard Lewkovitch =

Danish composer (1927–2024)

Bernhard Lewkovitch (28 May 1927 – 4 January 2024) was a Danish composer, educated at the musical conservatories at Paris and København. He worked as an organist and cantor at the Catholic St. Ansgar's Cathedral in Copenhagen. Lewkovitch is most widely recognized for his traditional Catholic influenced choir music.

== Works ==
His works include various pieces for instrumental ensembles, along with numerous compositions for mixed choir, e.g. Five Danish madrigals (op. 12) and Three Italian madrigals (op. 13), the latter set to poems by Torquato Tasso. Lewkovitch's style moved from modality to serialism in the 1950s, and he has also worked with avant-garde techniques.

Key works include Tre Madrigali di Torquato Tasso (1955, Choir), Improperia (1961, Choir), and Songs of Solomon (1985, Tenor, Clarinet, Contrabassoon And Horn).

== Death ==
Lewkovitch died on 4 January 2024, at the age of 96.

== Achievements ==
- 1949, Graduated as an organist from the Royal Danish Academy of Music
- 1963, Awarded the Carl Nielsen and Anne Marie Carl Nielsen grant
- 1972, Awarded an honorable diploma from the town of Assisi
- 1997, Awarded the Carl Nielsen and Anne Marie Carl Nielsen grant a second time
