= Jón Leifs and the Musical Invention of Iceland =

2019 book by Árni Heimir Ingólfsson

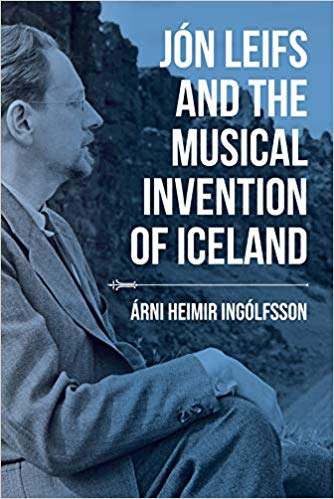
- Cover of first English-language edition
- Author: Árni Heimir Ingólfsson
- Language: Icelandic
- Genre: Music history
- Publisher: Indiana University Press
- Publication date: 2019
- Publication place: United States
- ISBN: 978-0-253-044051

Jón Leifs and the Musical Invention of Iceland (2019) is a book by the Icelandic music historian Árni Heimir Ingólfsson. It is a study of the life, music, and reception of Jón Leifs, Iceland's first major composer and a key figure in Icelandic twentieth-century music.

Ingólfsson's research on Leifs and his music dates back to 1997, when he published an article on Leifs's 1947 Requiem and related works, as well as writing on his Organ Concerto from 1930 for a senior thesis at Oberlin College. In 2009, Ingólfsson's biography of Leifs was published in Icelandic, as Jón Leifs: Líf í tónum (Jón Leifs: A Life in Music). This original version of the book received outstanding reviews, including five-star reviews in all three major Icelandic newspapers. It was nominated for the Icelandic Literary Prize (non-fiction category) and was hailed by Alex Ross, music critic of The New Yorker, who exclaimed: "My excitement at seeing the book was only slightly tempered by the fact that I couldn’t read a word of it." He also expressed the hope that Ingólfsson’s work would soon be translated into English.

The English version, in a translation/reworking by Ingólfsson himself, was published by Indiana University Press in November 2019. On his blog, The Rest is Noise, Alex Ross praised it as a "thoroughly absorbing study of a formidable and sometimes troubling figure who possessed one of the more original musical voices of the twentieth century." Other critics agreed, with Dan White describing the book as an "absorbing and significant work," and Steph Power praising it as a "carefully contextualized examination of his works and efforts to professionalize Icelandic music-making." In 2024, the newspaper Heimildin listed the book’s original version as no. 58 on a list of the 100 best Icelandic books of the 21st century.
