= Organ Concerto (Jón Leifs) =

1930 organ concerto by Jón Leifs

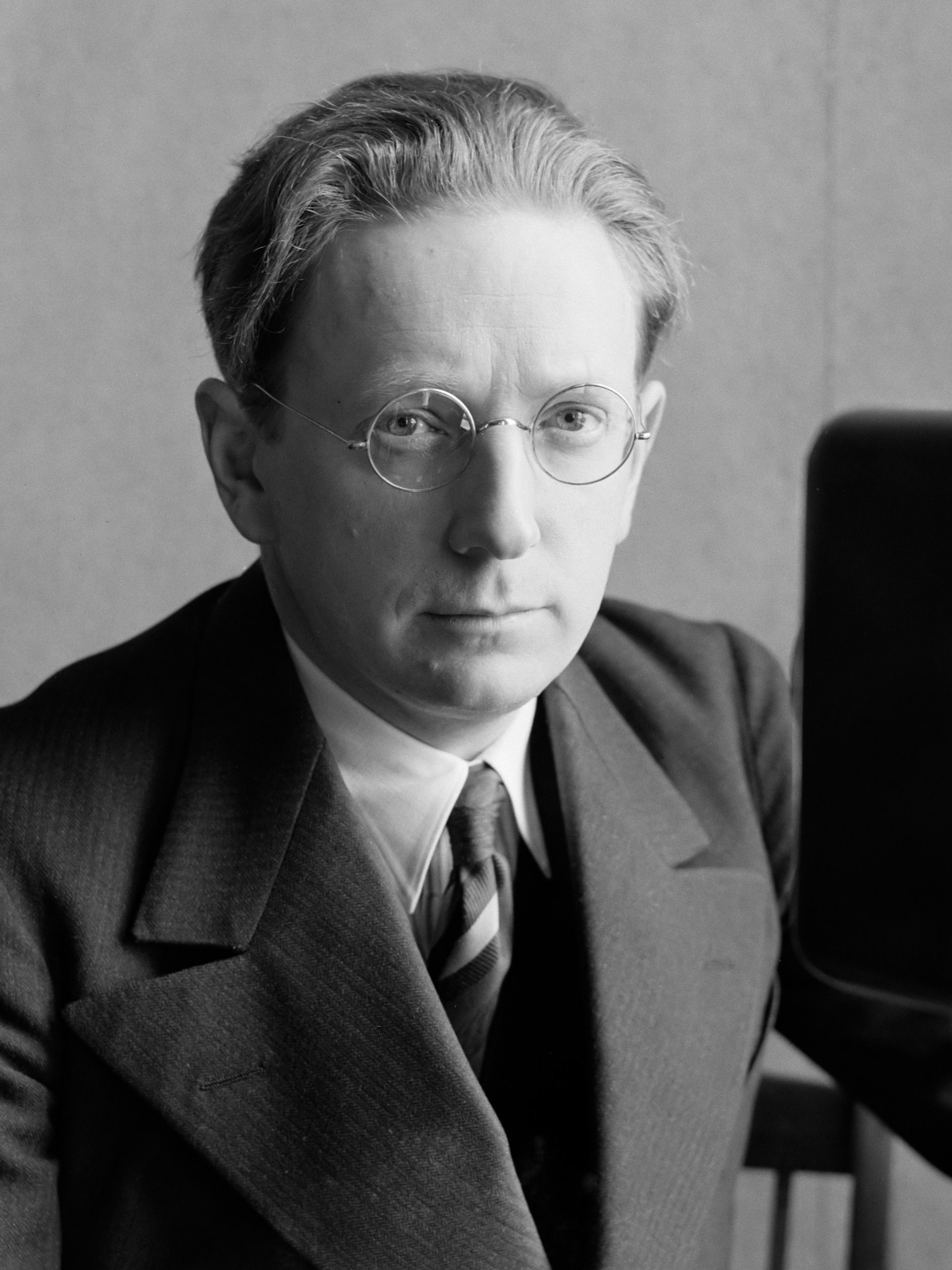
Jón Leifs (1934)

The Organ Concerto, Op. 7 is an organ concerto by Icelandic composer Jón Leifs. Its origins go back to 1917, when Leifs was just 18, and it was completed in 1930. It is an uncompromisingly dark work somewhat linked to medieval music, with influences from the tvísöngur tradition in a dissonant triadic context.

== History ==
The Organ Concerto was given its first performance at a music festival in Wiesbaden in 1935, with Kurt Utz as soloist and Hermann Thierfelder as conductor. A performance of the work in March 1941 in the Sing-Akademie zu Berlin, with no less than the Berlin Philharmonic conducted by Leifs himself, caused a scandal, with only twenty spectators remaining in the hall by the end and critic Fritz Stege condemning Leifs's "agonizingly narrow-minded intellectual world". This marked the end of the Icelandic composer's career in Nazi Germany, though he was not allowed to leave the country until 1944.

After the 1941 scandal in Berlin, Leifs's Organ Concerto was not heard again during the composer's lifetime. It was next performed by the Swedish organist Gunnar Idenstam in 1988, to positive reviews, and was recorded by the Swedish label BIS with Björn Steinar Sólbergsson as soloist. Further performances have followed, including a highly publicized one at the BBC Proms in the Royal Albert Hall in 2015, with Stephen Farr as soloist. In anticipation of that performance, Farr wrote about the work in The Guardian, noting that Leifs's score "demands feats of acrobatic virtuosity which test any normally-constituted human." Yet another performance took place at the Los Angeles Philharmonic's Reykjavík Festival in 2017, where organist James McVinnie played the solo part and Esa-Pekka Salonen conducted the Los Angeles Philharmonic. At that event, New Yorker critic Alex Ross noted, "the convulsive dissonances" of Leifs's Organ Concerto "startled a hall full of Sigur Rós fans."

== Music ==
The concerto is scored for solo organ, piccolo, flute, oboe, cor anglais, clarinet, bass clarinet, bassoon, contrabassoon, 2 horns, 2 trumpets, trombone, tuba, timpani, bass drum, cymbals, tam-tam, large woodblock/hammer, snare drum, triangle (3 percussion players required) and strings.

It contains three movements, with a short introduction and finale framing a much longer passacaglia consisting in thirty variations.

1. Introduzione. Allegro moderato
2. Passacaglia. Tempo moderato
3. Finale. L'istesso tempo

The theme of the middle movement comprises the total chromatic, and critic Alex Ross has described the overall effect as "Bach walking in the tundra." As the musicologist Árni Heimir Ingólfsson has pointed out in his book Jón Leifs and the Musical Invention of Iceland, another important thematic strand in the work is the medieval Icelandic chorale Allt eins og blómstrið eina, which Leifs had encountered during a folk-song collecting trip in Iceland in 1928. This theme inspired variations 12–13 of the Passacaglia, as well as appearing as a grand culmination of the work in variations 27-29.

The movements are played without pauses. The work lasts about 20 minutes.

== Recordings ==
- Björn Steinar Solbergsson // Iceland Symphony Orchestra — En Shao. BIS, 1999.
