= Mogens Wöldike =

Danish conductor and choirmaster

Mogens Wöldike in 1940

Mogens Wöldike (5 July 1897 – 20 October 1988) was a Danish conductor, choirmaster, organist, and scholar known for his interpretation of music from the Baroque and Classical periods, was born and died in Copenhagen. His son-in-law was the Haydn scholar Jens Peter Larsen. He studied under Carl Nielsen and Thomas Laub and graduated from Copenhagen University in 1920. He was organist at the Marine church in 1924 and the Christiansborg Palace Church from 1931; from 1959 to 1972 he was organist at Copenhagen Cathedral.

After the war he conducted the Swedish Radio Symphony Orchestra and from 1950 to 1967 worked regularly with the Danish Radio Symphony Orchestra.

He composed sets of organ chorales published in 1943, 1960 and 1972.

He was the founder of the Copenhagen Royal Chapel Choir.

He is the 1976 laureate of the Léonie Sonning Music Prize, the most prestigious musical award in Denmark.

== Partial discography ==
- Masterpieces of Music Before 1750: Haydn Society LP HSE 9039

He left many recordings. After a series of mainly baroque records in the 1930s, he recorded Saul, the St Matthew Passion, Mass in time of War, a number of Haydn symphonies, Nielsen concertos and choral works. He was the choir master of the Copenhagen Boys Choir on the 1953 recording of Britten's "A Ceremony Of Carols", Op.28 with Benjamin Britten conducting. (London LD.9102)
