= Requiem (Jón Leifs) =

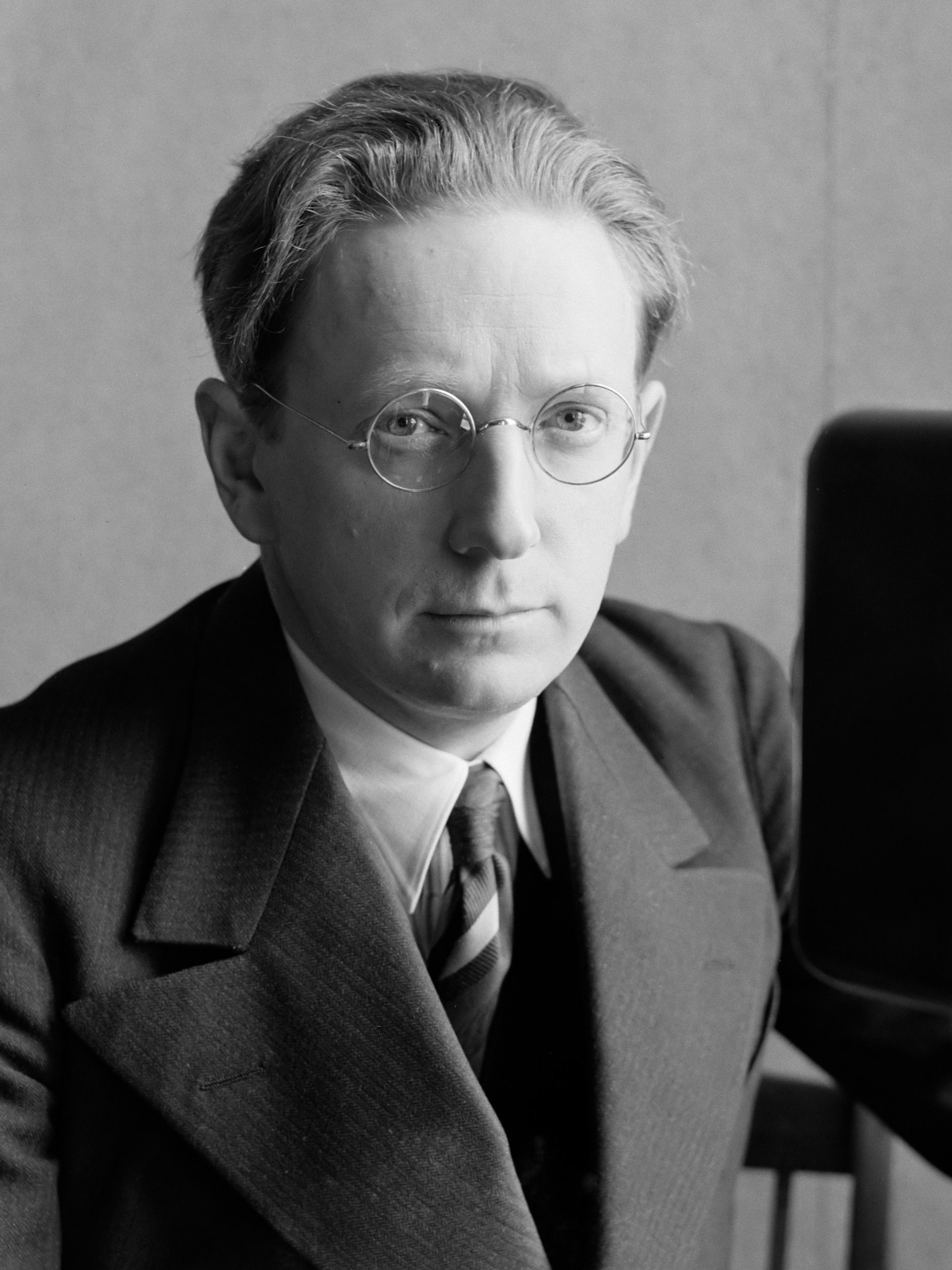
Jón Leifs (1934)

Requiem, Op. 33b, is a short a cappella choral piece by Icelandic composer Jón Leifs (1899–1968), dedicated to the memory of his daughter who drowned in a swimming accident shortly before her 18th birthday. The piece has only the name in common with the traditional Latin Mass for the dead. It is composed to a text which is a collage of Icelandic folk poetry and selections from a poem by Jónas Hallgrímsson. The music has the character of a lullaby and together with the text evokes the idea of a parent singing to a sleeping child. The piece is composed around an open fifth between A and E and constantly alternates between major and minor, ”giving it a serene halo mixing a sense of mystery, sadness and utter serenity“. Requiem is one of Leifs’ best-known compositions and contrasts with his general output, which is often described as "ungainly" and "dissonant".

== Composition history ==
Leifs and his first wife, Annie Riethof, had two daughters: Snót (b. 1923) and Líf (b. 1929). In 1944, they were allowed to leave Nazi Germany and moved to Stockholm. Soon after their arrival there, Leifs requested a divorce from Annie and found new lodgings for himself. Annie and the girls were opposed to the divorce and this led to a rift in Leifs’s relationship with his daughters, who refused to meet with him for a while. Líf continued her violin studies with Charles Barkel, a professor at the Stockholm Conservatory, and in summer 1947 she attended his violin course in Hamburgsund, a fishing village on the western coast of Sweden. On July 12, Líf went swimming in the ocean, despite a nearby fisherman warning her of the cold weather. She replied that she was an experienced swimmer and seems to have entered the sea naked; her swimming costume and shoes were later found on the beach.

As the Icelandic musicologist Árni Heimir Ingólfsson notes in his 2019 biography of Leifs, Jón Leifs and the Musical Invention of Iceland, Líf’s gloomy state in the months leading up to her death led the remaining members of the Leifs family to question whether Líf had meant to take her own life. Thus, Leifs, who had instigated the family breakup a few years earlier, was wracked with guilt and may well have blamed himself for the situation.

In the wake of Líf’s death, Leifs composed four works in her memory: Torrek op. 33a for voice and piano (text by Egill Skallagrímsson); the choral Requiem; Elegies for male chorus, and the string quartet Vita et mors (Life and Death). As Ingólfsson has noted, Leifs had an inevitable point of departure when composing the music for his Requiem: "the quiet, understated, yet eerily foreboding Lullaby op. 14a, composed shortly after Líf’s birth." The oscillation between major and minor harmonies that is so characteristic of the Requiem can also be heard in several of Leifs’s earlier scores, particularly the Lullaby, but also for example in his Iceland Cantata (Þjóðhvöt) op. 13. Leifs composed Requiem in only a few days, which is all the more remarkable since he first had to assemble the work’s text from several different sources.

Leifs’s Requiem was apparently first performed at Líf’s funeral at the Reykjavík Cathedral on August 13, 1947. Its first public performance was with the Reykjavík Music Society Chorus under the direction of the Austrian émigré musician Victor Urbancic; this choir performed the work at a Nordic choir festival in Copenhagen in 1948 to excellent reviews. After this, the Requiem was largely forgotten until 1973, when it was performed by the Hamrahlíð Choir at the opening ceremony of the ISCM Festival, then held in Iceland for the first time. This choir’s recording of the work was highly praised and was for a while the only commercially available recording. In recent decades, the work has been recorded many times, both by Icelandic and foreign choirs.

== Selected recordings ==
- The Hamrahlíð Choir, dir. Þorgerður Ingólfsdóttir. Kveðið í bjargi. Íslensk tónverkamiðstöð 1988.
- Langholtskirkja Church Choir, dir. Jón Stefánsson. An Anthology of Icelandic Church Music. BIS Records, 1983.
- Hallgrímskirkja Motet Choir, dir. Hörður Áskelsson. Jón Leifs: Hekla. BIS Records, 1999.
- Schola Cantorum Reykjavíkensis, dir. Hörður Áskelsson. Meditatio, Music for Mixed Choir. BIS Records, 2016.
- Skylark Vocal Ensemble, dir. Matthew Guard. Crossing Over. Sono Luminus, 2016.
- Choir of Clare College, Cambridge, dir. Graham Ross. Ice Land: The Eternal Music. Harmonia Mundi, 2022.
