= Anneli Arho =

Finnish music educator, writer and composer

Marjo Anneli Arho (born 12 April 1951) is a Finnish music educator, writer and composer.

== Life ==
Anneli Arho was born in Helsinki and studied theory and composition at the Sibelius Academy with Jukka Tiensuu. She continued study at Freiburg with Klaus Huber and Brian Ferneyhough, graduating as a Doctor of Music. She took a position as a teacher at the Department of Composition and Music Theory, Sibelius Academy, and writes professional articles for magazines including Philosophy of Music Education Review. She is married to Jukka Tiensuu.

== Works ==
Selected works include:

- Minos (1978) for harpsichord, dedicated to Jukka Tiensuu
- Once upon a time (1980) woodwind quintet
- Aikaika (Les temps emboites) (1987) for three cellos
- Answer for mezzo-soprano, horn and string quartet (1978)
- Par comparaison for three cellos (1981)
- Atmosphere (1997)
- In sordina (2006)

Arho's compositions have been recorded and issued on CD, including:

- The Exuberant Harpsichord – Jukka Tiensuu, harpsichord – Works of György Ligeti, Thomas Morley, Jean-Philippe Rameau, Erik Bergman, Anneli Arho, Esa-Pekka Salonen, Usko Merilainen, Francois-Bernard Mache, Finlandia.
