= Agnes Janson =

Swedish opera singer

Agnes Janson, from Idun (August 1899)

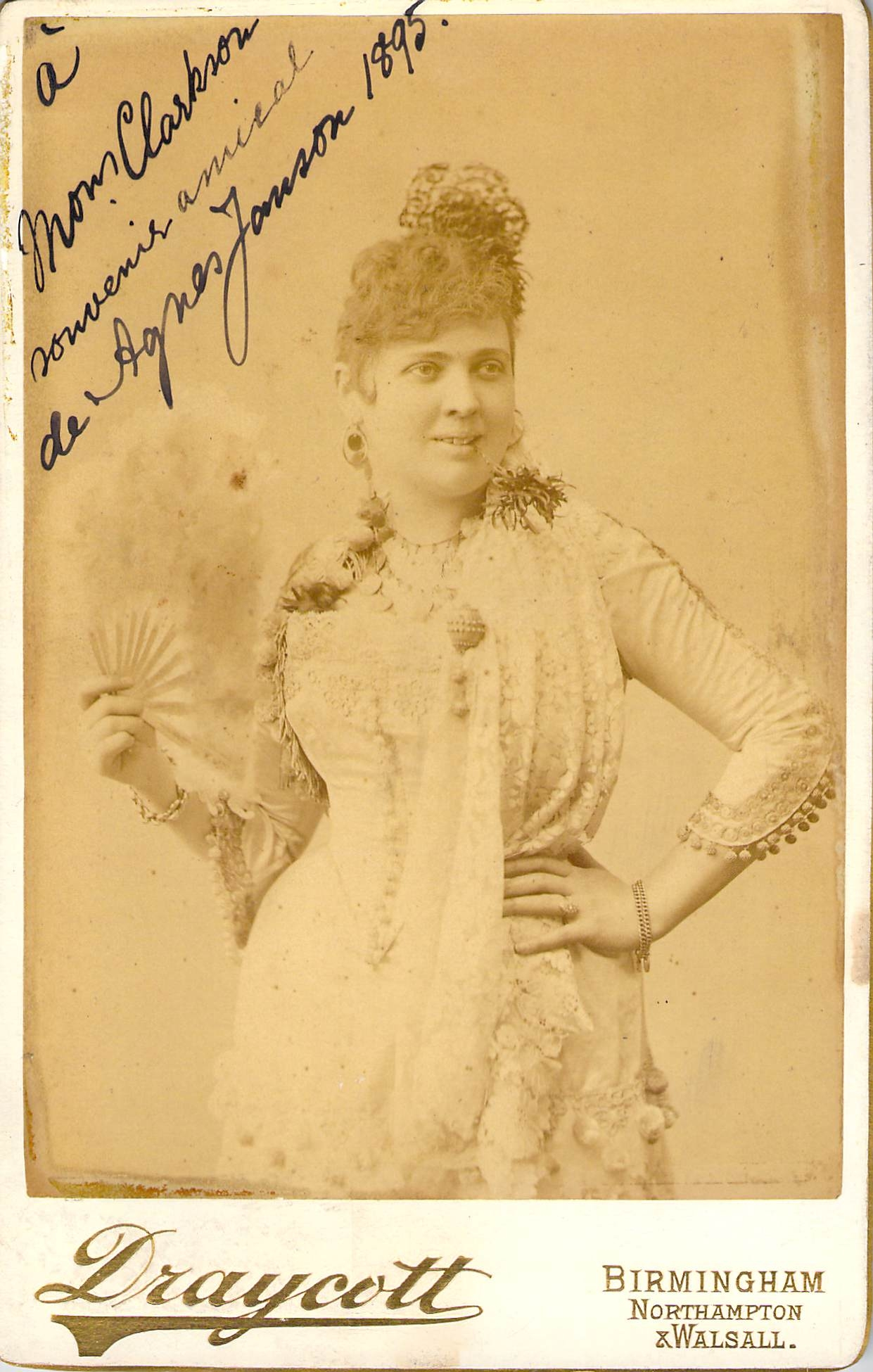
Agnes Janson

Agnes Sofia Charlotta Janson, married name Fischer, (1861–1947) was a Swedish mezzo-soprano opera singer and recitalist who later moved to Australia. After her debut in April 1883 at the Royal Swedish Opera as Azucena in Verdi's Il trovatore, she remained with the company until 1885. Thereafter she sang mainly in recitals, principally in the United Kingdom but also other major European concert halls. In 1906, she settled in Australia, where she taught voice at the Melbourne Conservatory until her retirement in 1927.

== Early life, family and education ==
Born in Stockholm on 20 June 1861, Janson was the daughter of the mason Per Adolf Jansson and his wife Johanna Maria née Lund. Recognized for her voice and musical abilities at a young age, she studied voice at the Swedish Conservatory (1876–81) where she was a pupil of Julius Günther and later Hugo Beyer.

In 1896, she married the Swedish-Norwegian diplomat Andreas Morten Hammer Fisher.

== Career ==
She made her first public appearance in 1882 at a concert arranged by the Music Society, in the role of Oluf's mother in Niels Gade's Elverskud. The following year on 30 April she made her debut at the Royal Opera as Azucena in Il travatore, after which she was engaged by the company in July and remained there until 1885. Among her most successful roles were Amneris in Verdi's Aida and Fidès in Giacomo Meyerbeer's Le prophète.

While continuing her voice studies in Rome and London, she was also a successful performer in recitals and operas. In the early 1890s and again in 1903, she performed at London's Covent Garden and became a member of the Moody-Manners Opera Company. Her stage appearances included the title role in Bizet's Carmen, Siebel and Marthe in Gounod's Faust and Mamma Lucia in Pietro Mascagni's Cavalleria rusticana.

In 1900 she travelled to Australia with George Musgrove's Grand Opera Company where she was acclaimed as an outstanding singer. She was also praised for her exceptional enunciation in Italian, German, and English. She returned in 1906 when she became a voice teacher at the Melbourne Conservatory until her retirement in 1927.

Agnes Janson died on 17 January in Diamond Creek, Australia.
