= Cody (band) =

Danish musical band

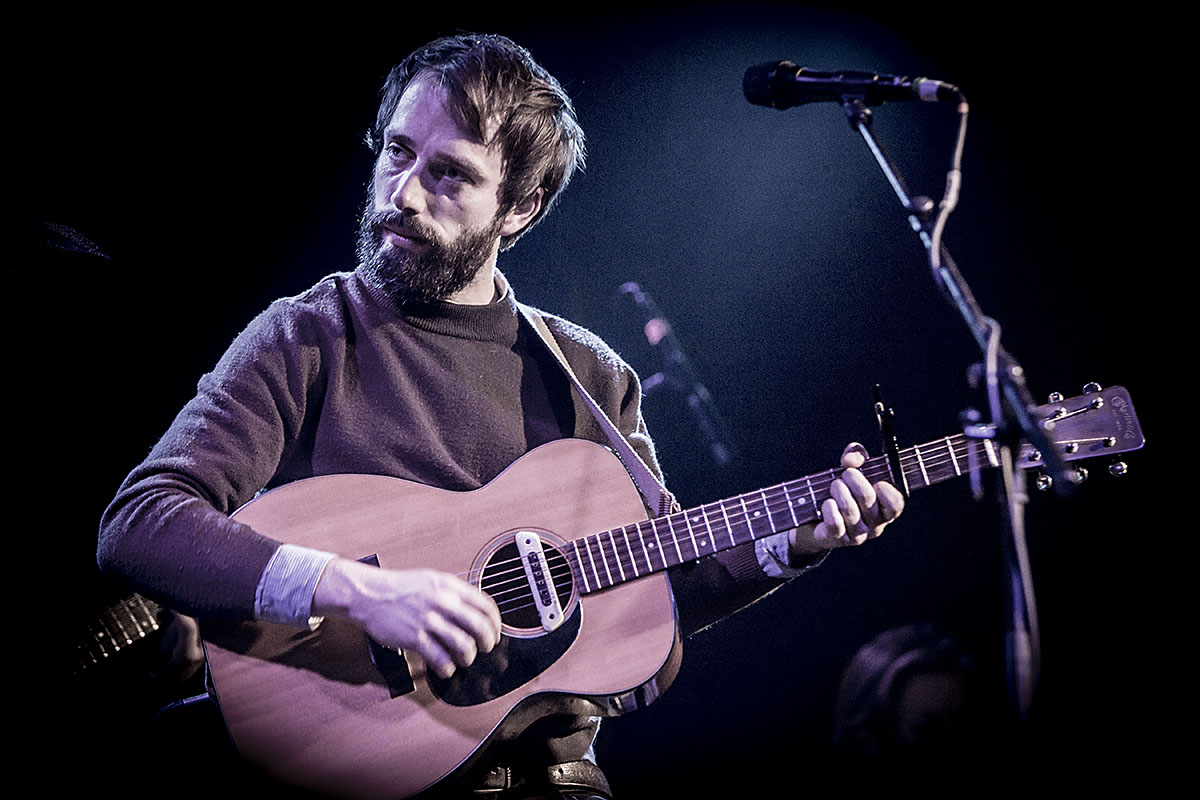
Cody - Kasper Kaae

Cody stylized as CODY is a Danish musical band founded by the Danish roots musician and songwriter Kasper Kaae in 2009. The band performs alternative country, pop and Nordic folk music. It has released three albums and two EPs to date.

Kaae began writing songs of his own in 2006 and several musicians and friends later joined. They played the Danish Roskilde Festival three times, G! Festival, Spot Festival, By:Larm, Fusion Festival, Montreux Jazz Festival.

Cody's music was used in the soundtrack of the film 12 Meter Ohne Kopf and Danish films En Familie, Kapringen and Me & You Forever.

== Discography ==
=== Albums ===
Year	Album	Peak positions	Certification
Year	Album	DEN	Certification
2010	Songs	–	
2012	Fractures	20	
2014	Windshield	18	
2016	I'll Ride with you		
2020	Win Some		

=== EPs ===
- 2009: Cody
- 2011: Under the Pillow, Under the elms

=== Soundtracks ===
- 12 Meter Ohne Kopf (German)
- En Familie (Danish, by Pernille Fischer Christensen)
- Kapringen (Danish, by Tobias Lindholm)
- Me & You Forever (Danish by Kaspar Munk)
- Kraftidioten (2014) movie soundtrack
