= Swedish Chamber Orchestra =

The Swedish Chamber Orchestra (Swedish: Svenska kammarorkestern) is a Swedish orchestra based in Örebro. Established under its current name in 1995, its primary concert venue is the Örebro Concert Hall.

The historical precursor ensembles to the orchestra included the Harmonic Society (Harmoniska sällskapet), which was active from 1831 to 1837. In 1859, the Philharmoniska sällskapet (Philharmonic Society) was founded under Karl Johan Lewerth. A competitor organisation, the Örebro musikförening Philomele (Örebro Music Association Philomele), was founded in 1868, and continued operations until 1916. In 1909, the Örebro orkesterförening (Örebro Orchestra Association), as an amateur orchestra. The ensemble began to receive support from the Örebro municipality in 1912. The composer Ingvar Lidholm took up a leadership post with the ensemble in 1947. In 1950, four full-time band musicians joined the orchestra.

In 1955, the organisation was transformed into a municipal foundation under the name of the Örebro orkesterstiftelse (Örebro Orchestra Foundation). Additional musicians, both professionals and military musicians, were recruited to the ensemble. In 1962, the Örebro kammarorkester (Örebro Chamber Orchestra) was formally established. In 1977, a new reorganisation occurred to form the Örebro symfoniorkester (Örebro Symphony Orchestra), as a professional ensemble. In parallel, the Örebro orkesterförening resumed operations as an amateur orchestra.

In May 1995, the most recent reorganisation combined the Örebro Symphony Orchestra and the Örebro Chamber Orchestra into a single ensemble, the Swedish Chamber Orchestra. Thomas Dausgaard became the first principal conductor of the new ensemble in 1997. Nikolaj Znaider was principal guest conductor of the orchestra for three years, from 2009 to 2012. Dausgaard concluded his principal conductorship of the orchestra after the 2018–2019 season, and subsequently took the title of conductor laureate with the orchestra. In May 2017, the orchestra announced the appointment of Martin Fröst as its next principal conductor, effective with the 2019-2020 season, with an initial contract of 3 seasons.

Karin Rehnqvist was composer-in-residence with the orchestra from 2000 to 2004. The orchestra has recorded commercially for such labels as BIS Records, Simax, Naxos Records, Chandos Records and Hyperion Records.

== Conductors and musicians in leadership positions ==
- Adolf Andrén (1909–1917)
- Viktor Fritzell (1917–1918)
- Josef Lind (1920–1930)
- Nils Höglund (1930–1939)
- Gunnar Marcusson (1939–1945)
- Olgerts Bistevins (1945–1946)
- Ingvar Lidholm (1947–1957)
- Rune Larsson (1957–1968)
- Lennart Hedwall (1968–1974)
- Göran W. Nilson (1974–1981)
- František Vajnar (1981–1983)
- Göran W. Nilson (1983–1993)
- Thomas Dausgaard (1997–2019)
- Martin Fröst (2019–present)
