= David Wikander =

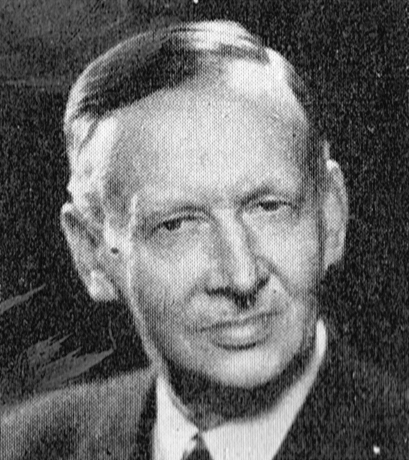

David Wikander (21 July 1884 – 15 November 1955), was a Swedish musicologist, organist and composer.

Born in Säfsnäs parish in Dalarna, Wikander was organist at Stockholm's Storkyrkan. He arranged many traditional songs of the Dalarna region. In 1952, he received the Royal Swedish medal, Litteris et artibus.

Wikander died in Stockholm at the age of 71.

== Works, editions, recordings ==
Choral:

- Dofta, dofta, vit syrén (text: Emil Kléen) Scent, scent, white lilac
- Kung Liljekonvalje (text: Gustav Fröding) King Lily of the valley
- Förvårskväll (text: Ragnar Jändel)* Spring evening
