= Jón Leifs =

Icelandic composer, pianist, and conductor

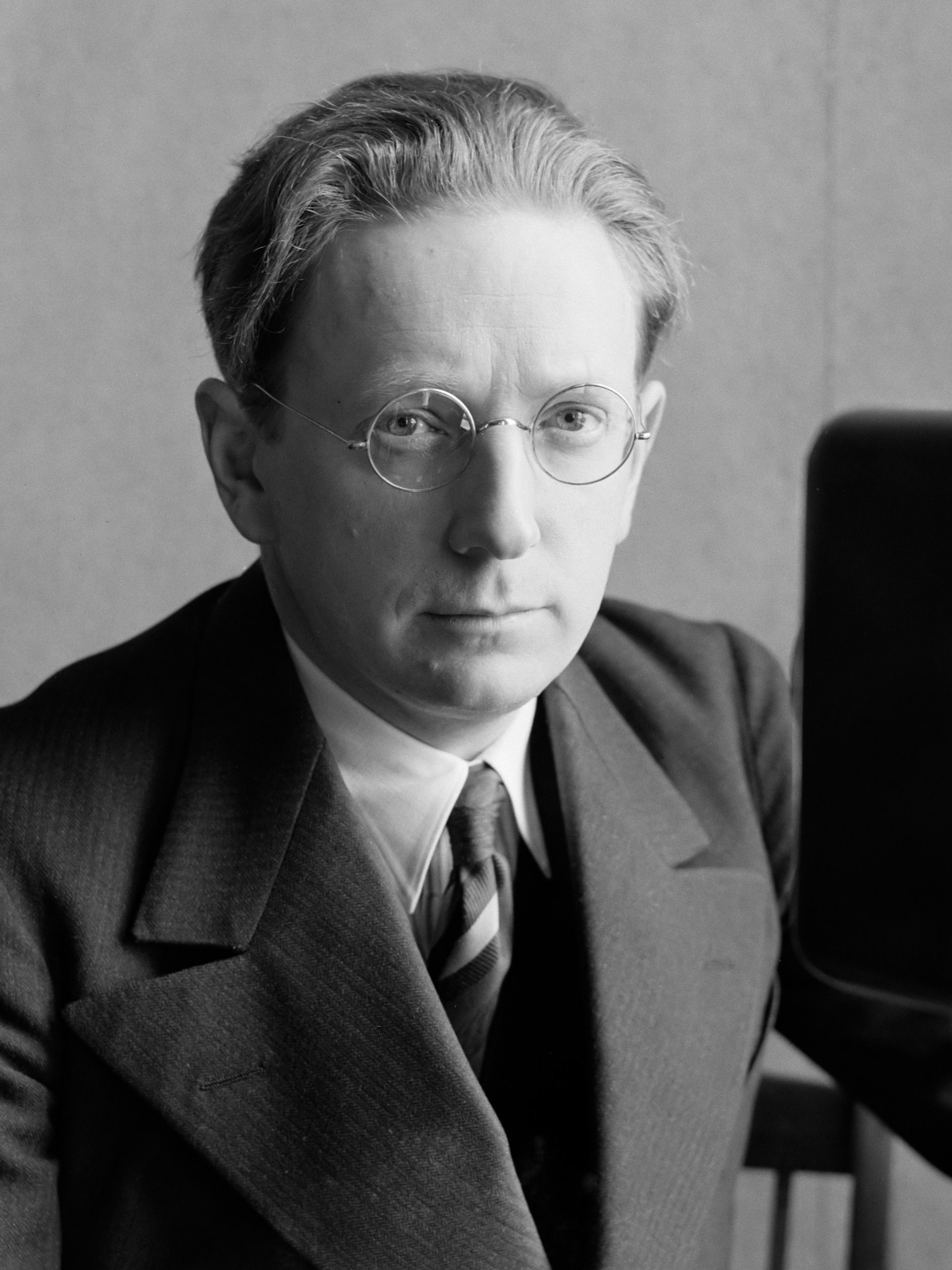
Jón Leifs (1934)

Jón Leifs (Icelandic pronunciation: [ˈjouːn ˈleifs]; born Jón Þorleifsson; 1 May 1899 – 30 July 1968) was an Icelandic composer, pianist, and conductor.

== Life ==
Jón Leifs was born Jón Þorleifsson, at the farm Sólheimar, then in the Húnavatnssýsla, northwestern Iceland. He left for Germany in 1916 to study at the Leipzig Conservatory. He graduated in 1921 having studied piano with Robert Teichmüller, but decided not to embark on a career as a pianist, devoting his time instead to conducting and composing. During this period he also encountered the legendary pianist-composer Ferruccio Busoni, who urged him to "follow his own path in composition".

In the 1920s Jón Leifs conducted a number of symphony orchestras in Germany, Czechoslovakia, Norway and Denmark, thus becoming the only internationally successful Icelandic conductor to date, although he failed to obtain a fixed position. During a tour of Norway, the Faroe Islands and Iceland with the Hamburger Philharmoniker, he gave the very first symphonic concerts in Iceland in the summer of 1926 (a total of 13 concerts with different programmes). During this period, he was also very active as a writer on music and musical interpretation, both in German and Icelandic. Between 1925 and 1928, he travelled through Iceland on three occasions to record folk songs among the population in his home county Húnavatnssýsla in Northern Iceland, thus making a substantial contribution to musicology in Iceland. His observations on this were published in both Icelandic and German periodicals.

Beginning with piano arrangements of Icelandic folk songs, Jón Leifs started an active career as a composer in the 1920s. From the 1930s he concentrated his efforts on the composition of large orchestral works, some of which were not performed until after his death. Most of his output is inspired by Icelandic natural phenomena. In the piece Hekla he depicts the eruption of the volcano Hekla which he witnessed. Dettifoss (Op. 57) was inspired by Dettifoss, Europe's second most powerful waterfall. In the Saga Symphony he musically portrays five characters from the classic Icelandic sagas.

In 1935 Jón Leifs was appointed musical director of the Icelandic National Broadcasting Service. However, having found it difficult to implement his vision for the radio service, he resigned from the post in 1937 and returned to Germany.

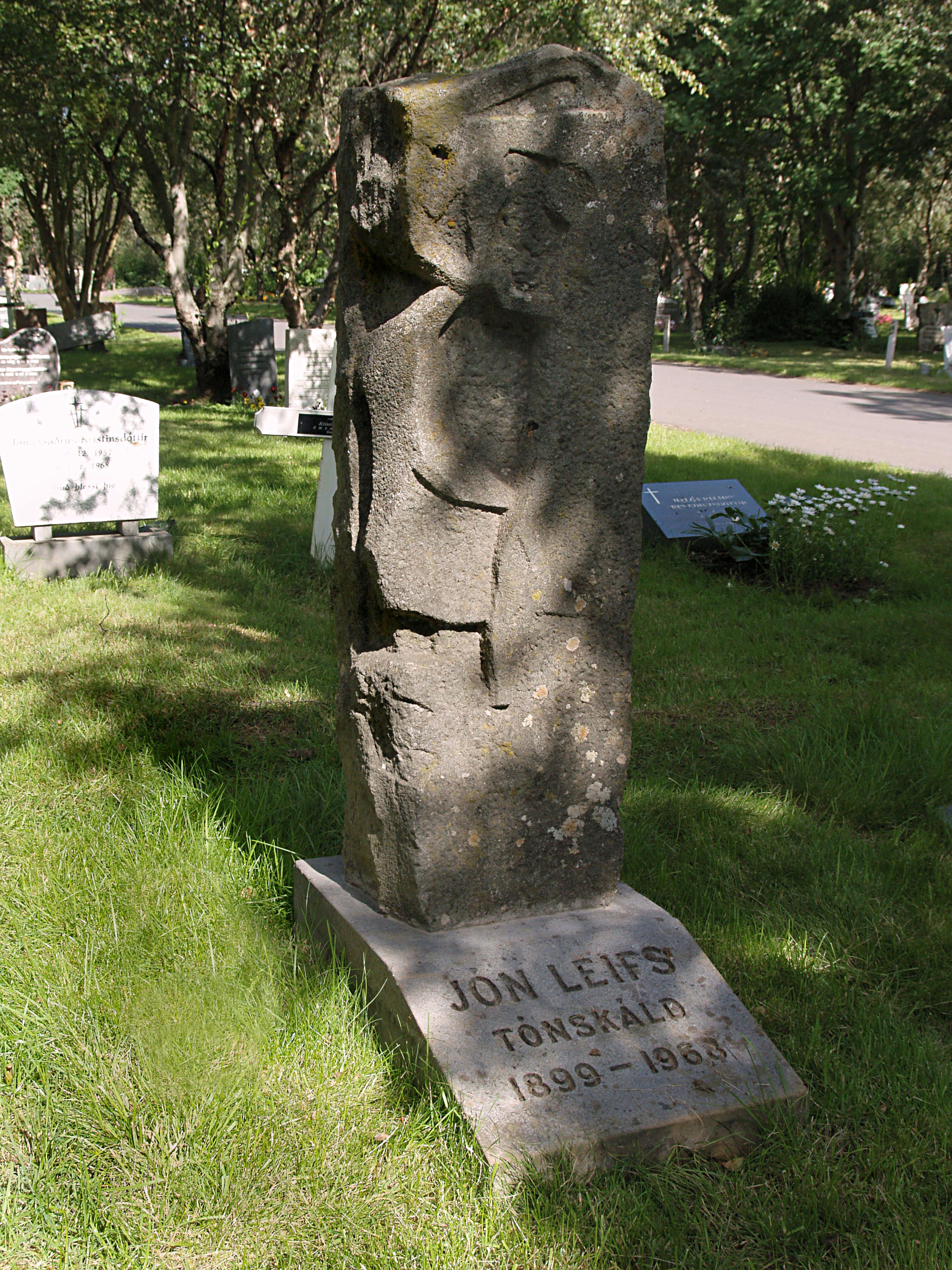
Gravesite of Jón Leifs at Fossvogsgarður cemetery in Reykjavík.

Jón Leifs married the pianist Annie Riethof soon after graduating from the Leipzig Conservatory. They had two daughters, Snót Leifs and Líf Leifs, and made their home first in Wernigerode. Since Riethof was Jewish, the family lived under constant threat of Nazi persecution. In 1944, the couple managed to obtain permission to leave Germany and moved to Sweden with their daughters. However, by this time their marriage was showing signs of strain and they divorced in 1946. Jón Leifs later married, and divorced, a Swedish woman, Thea Andersson. His third wife, who survived him, was Þorbjörg Jóhannsdóttir Leifs (1919–2008). She and Jón had one son, Leifur (1957–2022).

In 1945 Jón Leifs moved back to Iceland (leaving his family in Sweden), and became a fierce proponent of music education and of artists’ rights. This included working for the ratification by Iceland of the Berne Convention, which happened in 1947, and setting up the Performing Rights Society of Iceland (STEF) in 1948.

In 1947 tragedy struck. Jón Leifs’ younger daughter Líf drowned in a swimming accident off the coast of Sweden in 1947, aged only eighteen. Overcome with grief, he composed four works dedicated to her memory, including Requiem Op. 33b for mixed choir, perhaps his most celebrated piece. The other works are Torrek Op. 33a, for solo voice and piano, Erfiljóð (In memoriam) Op. 35 for male choir, and the string quartet Vita et mors Op. 36.

Jón Leifs composed his last work, Consolation, Intermezzo for string orchestra, as he had only weeks to live. He died of lung cancer in Reykjavík in 1968.

Jón Leifs and his first wife are the subjects of the film Tears of Stone (Tár úr steini) (1995) by Icelandic director Hilmar Oddsson. A square in Bergholz-Rehbrücke (Nuthetal, Germany), where he lived with his family from the 1930s until 1944, is named after him. An English-language biography, Jón Leifs and the Musical Invention of Iceland, by the musicologist Árni Heimir Ingólfsson, was published in 2019 and was listed as one of that year's most notable books by The New Yorker critic Alex Ross.

== Works ==
- Vökudraumur (Reverie) for solo piano (1913)
- Torrek – Intermezzo, Op. 1 No. 2 (piano piece) (1919)
- Trilogia piccola, Op. 1 (1922–24)
- Four Pieces for solo piano, Op. 2 (1921)
- Studies for solo violin, Op. 3 (1924)
- 3 Songs, Op. 4 (1924)
- Organ Prelude, Op. 5, No. 1 (1924)
- Kyrie, chorus, Op. 5, No. 2 (1924)
- Loftr-Suite, Op. 6a (1925)
- Íslensk þjóðlög (Icelandic Folk Songs) for solo piano (1925)
- Organ Concerto, Op. 7 (1930)
- Variations on a Theme by Beethoven, Op. 8 (1930)
- Iceland Overture, Op. 9 (1926)

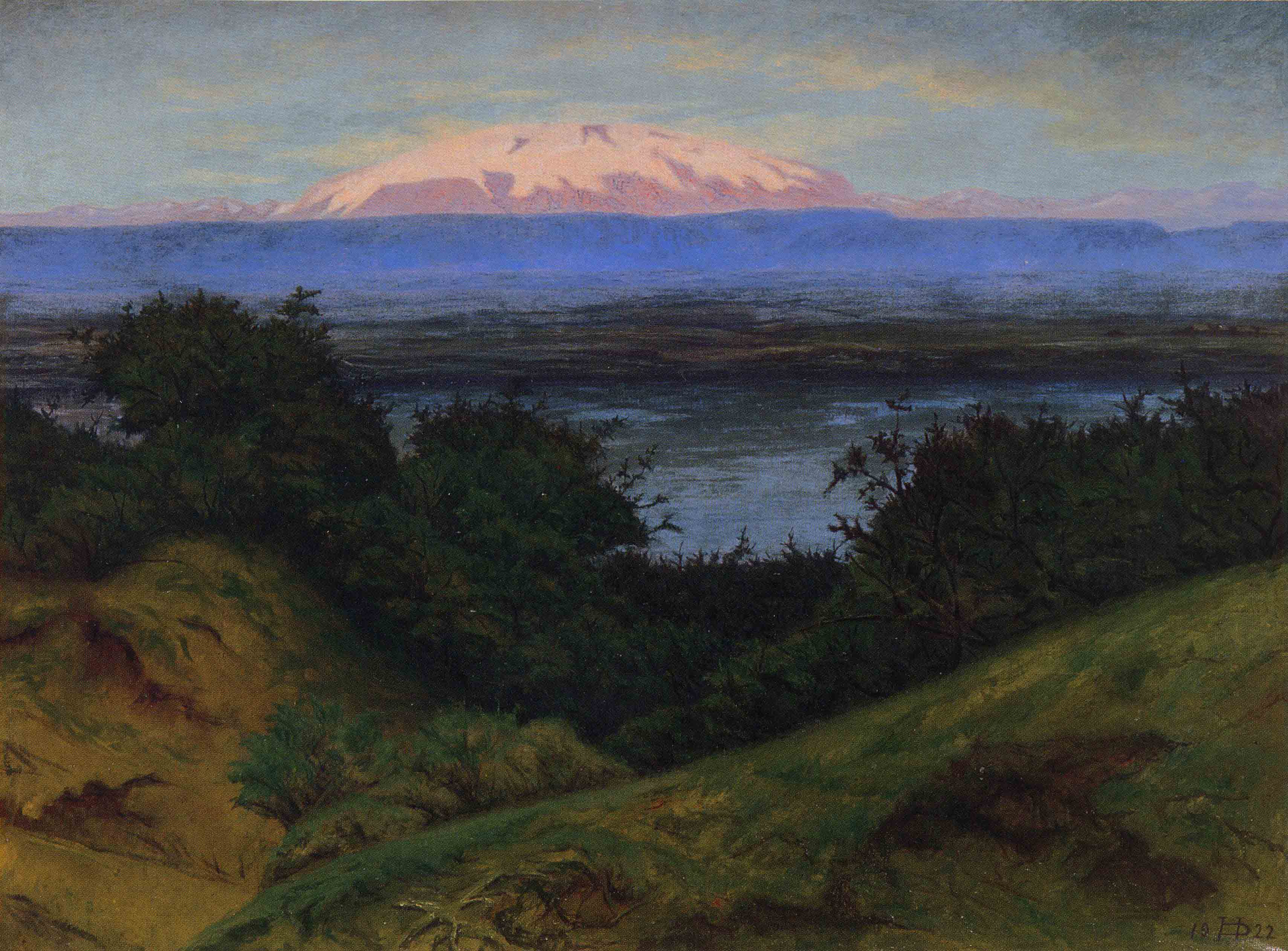
Hekla ur Laugardal

- Overture to Loftr, Op. 10 (1927)
- Íslensk rímnadanslög (Icelandic Folk Dances), Op. 11 (1929–30)
- 3 Church Songs (Hymns) for voice and piano/organ, Op. 12a (1929)
- Iceland Cantata, Op. 13 (1930)
- 2 Songs for voice and piano, Op. 14a (1929–30)
- Ný rímnadanslög (New Icelandic Dances), Op. 14b (1931)
- Íslendingaljóð (Poems of Icelanders) for male chorus, Op. 15a (1931)
- Sjavarvísur (Ocean Verses) for male chorus, Op. 15b (1931)
- 3 Organ Preludes, Op. 16 (1931)
- Íslenskir söngdansar (Icelandic Dance-Songs) for chorus and instruments ad lib, Op. 17a (c. 1931)
- 2 Songs for voice and piano, Op. 18a (1931)
- 2 Songs of the Edda (Love Verses from the Edda) for tenor and piano, Op. 18b (1931–32)
- Nocturne for harp, Op. 19a (c. 1934)
- 2 Icelandic Folk Songs for voice and piano, Op. 19b (1934)
- Edda, Part 1 "The Creation of the World", Op. 20 (1932–37)
- Mors et Vita, Op. 21 (1st String Quartet) (1939)
- Guðrúnarkviða, Op. 22 (1940)
- 3 Songs for voice and piano, Op. 23 (1941)
- 3 Saga Songs (3 Songs from Icelandic Sagas) for tenor and piano, Op. 24 (1941)
- Songs from the Saga Symphony for tenor and piano, Op. 25 (1941)
- Sögusinfónía (Saga Symphony), Op. 26 (1941–42)
- 3 ættjarðarsöngvar (3 Patriotic Songs) for male chorus, Op. 27 (1927–43)
- 3 söngvar eftir Jónas Hallgrímsson (3 Verses by Jónas Hallgrímsson) for chorus, Op. 28 (1943)
- Íslendingaljóð (Poems of Icelanders) for male chorus, Op. 29 (1943)
- Íslendingaljóð (Poems of Icelanders) for chorus, Op. 30 (1943)
- 3 Ancient Songs for voice and piano, Op. 31 (1944)
- 3 alþýðusöngvar (3 Folksongs) for chorus, Op. 32 (1945)
- Torrek, Op. 33a (1947)
- Requiem, Op. 33b (1947)
- Baldr, Op.34 (1943–47), A Choreographic Drama in Two Acts
- Erfiljóð (Elegies), Op. 35 (1948)
- Vita et Mors, Op. 36 (2nd String Quartet) (1948–51)
- Fjallasöngvar (Mountain Verses) for mezzo-soprano, baritone, male chorus, timpani, percussion and double bass, Op. 37 (1948)
- Þorgerðarlög (Songs of Thorgerdur) for male chorus, flute, viola and cello, Op. 38 (1948)
- 2 söngvar (2 Songs) for male chorus, Op. 39 (1948–61)
- Réminiscence du nord, Op. 40 (1952)
- Landfall – Overture, Op. 41 (1955)
- Edda, Part 2, "Líf guðanna" (The Lives of the Gods), oratorio for soli, chorus and orchestra, Op. 42 (1951–66)
- Baptism Invocation for baritone and organ, Op. 43 (1957)
- Trois peintures abstraites, Op. 44 (Þrjú óhlutræn málverk) (1955)
- Memorial Songs on the Death of Jónas Hallgrímsson for mezzo-soprano/baritone and piano, Op. 45 (1958)
- Vorvísa (Spring Song), Op. 46 (1958)
- Turmglockenspiel über Themen aus Beethovens Neunter Symphonie for carillon (1958)
- Das Leben muss trotz allem Stets weiter gehen for carillon (1958)
- Es ist ein Ros entsprungen for folksong, chorus (arr. 1958)
- Stand, House of Stone for tenor and piano, Op. 47a (1958)
- Jónas Hallgrímsson in memoriam, Op. 48 (1961)
- Boy's Song, "Strákalag", Op. 49 (1961)
- Quintet, Op. 50 for flute/piccolo, clarinet, bassoon, viola and cello (1961)
- Geysir, Op. 51 (1961)
- Hekla, Op. 52 (1961) for orchestra and percussion
- Elegy, Op. 53 (1961)
- Víkingasvar (Viking's Answer), Op. 54 (1962), Intermezzo for wind ensemble, percussion, violas and double basses
- Fine I, Op. 55 (1963) (Farewell to earthly life)
- Fine II, Op. 56 (1963) (Farewell to earthly life)
- Dettifoss, Op. 57 (1964)

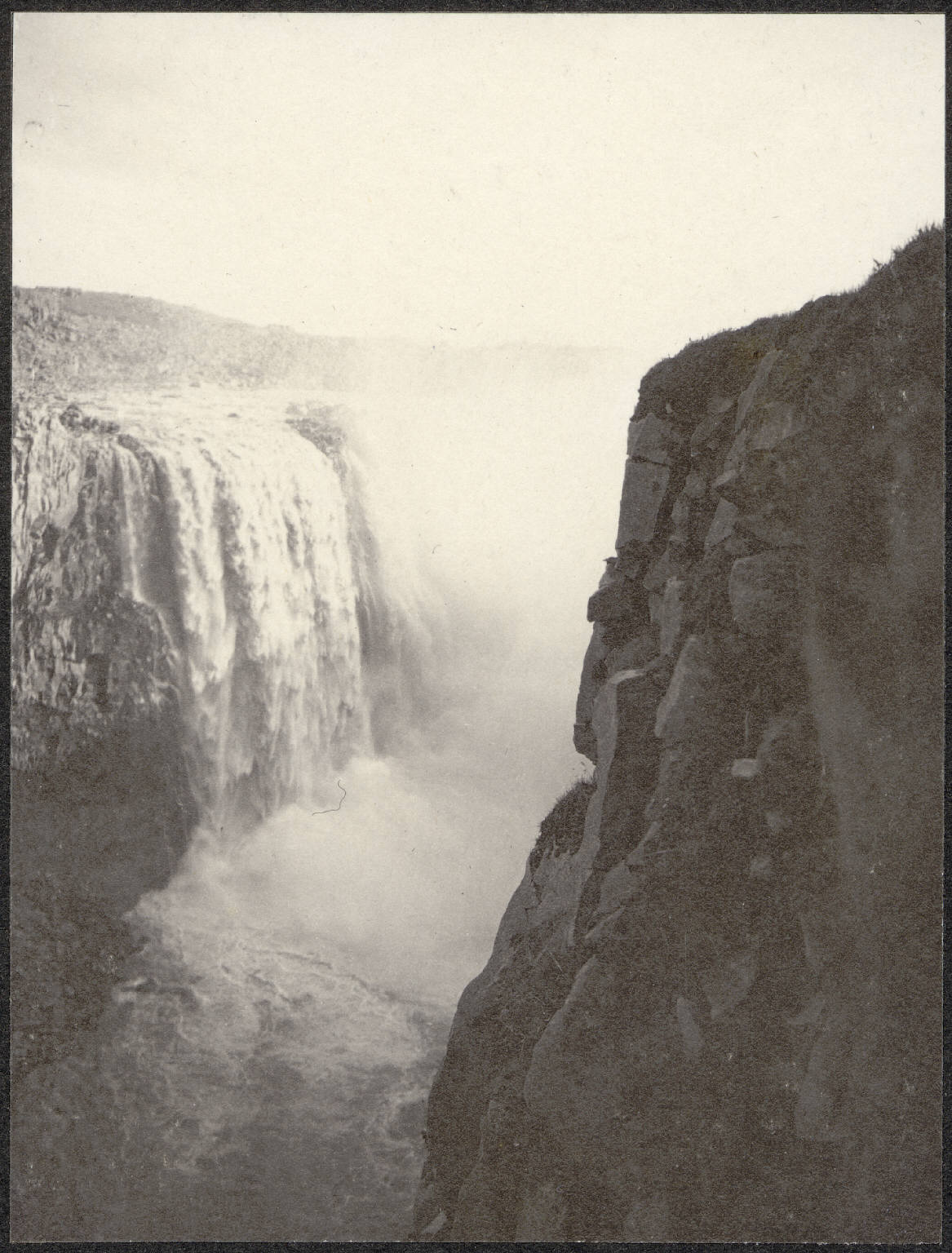
Dettifoss. (4558931050)

- Scherzo concreto, Op.58 (1964)
- Nótt (Night), Op. 59 (1964)
- Darraðarljóði, Op. 60 (1964)
- Helga kviða Hundingsbana, Op.61 (1964)
- Grógaldr, Op. 62 (1965)
- Hafís (Drift Ice), Op. 63 (1965)
- El Greco, Op. 64 (3rd String Quartet) (1965)
- Heilsuheimt (Health Regained) for chorus (arr. 1965) [orig. work of Ludwig van Beethoven, Op. 132, No. 2]
- Edda, Part 3 "Ragnarok" (The Twilight of the Gods), oratorio for soli, choruses and orchestra, op. 65 (1966–68, incomplete)
- Hughreysting (Consolation), Intermezzo for string orchestra, Op. 66 (1968)

=== Recordings ===
The Iceland Symphony Orchestra with En Shao (cond.) has recorded Hekla Op.52 and Dettifoss, Op. 57.

== Bibliography ==
- Åhlén, Carl-Gunnar (2002). Jón Leifs: kompositör i motvind (in Swedish). Stockholm. ISBN 978-91-7486-596-7.
- Ragnarsson, Hjálmar H. (1990). Jón Leifs. Andvari (in Icelandic) (115 ed.). Reykjavík: Hið íslenzka þjóðvinafélag. pp. 5–38. ISSN 0258-3771.
- Árni Heimir Ingólfsson. 2019. Jón Leifs and the Musical Invention of Iceland.Indiana University Press. ISBN 978-02-5304-405-1.
