= Örebro Concert Hall =

Concert hall in Örebro, Sweden

- Örebro konserthus
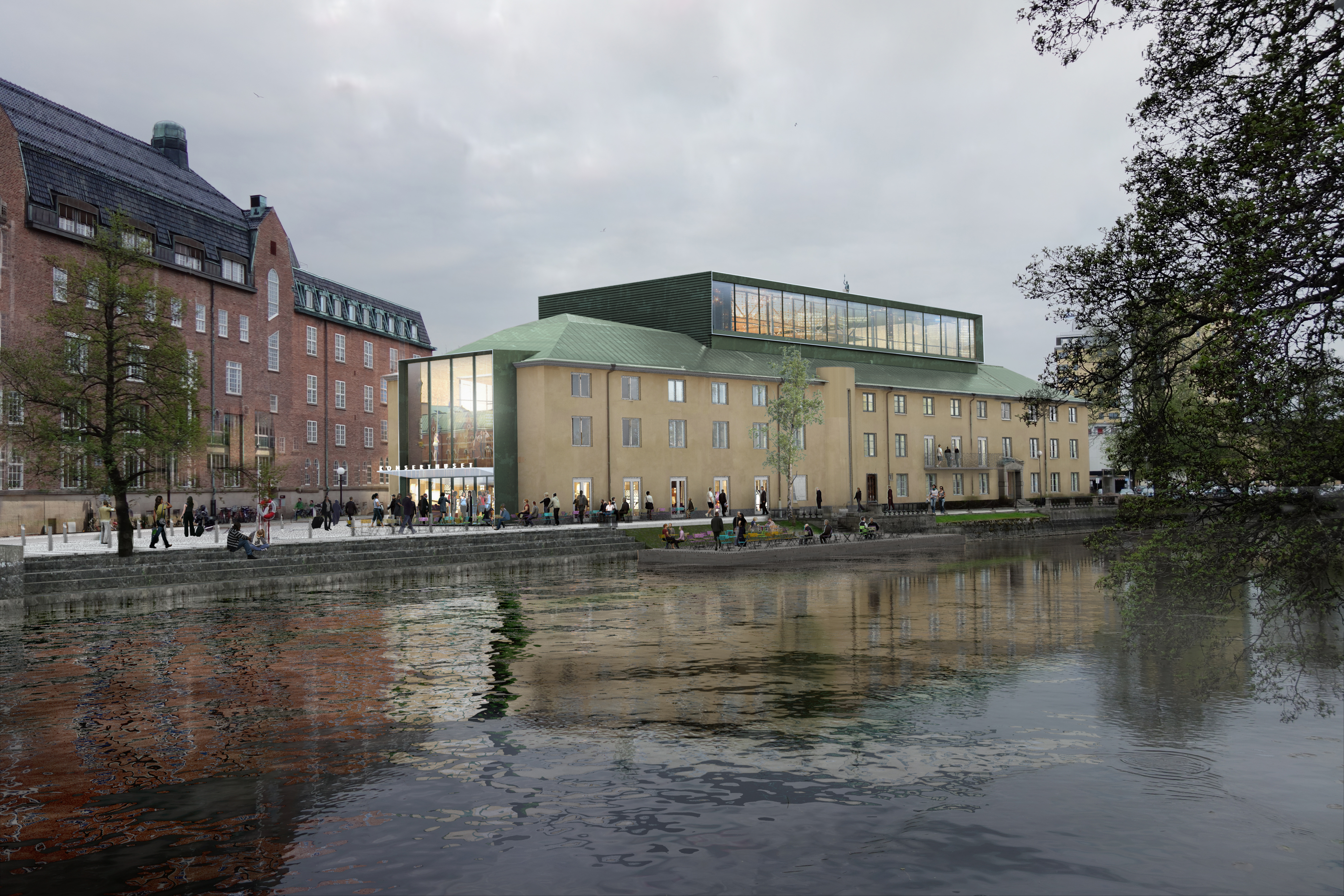
- Örebro Concert Hall
- Interactive map of the Örebro Concert Hall area

General information
- Location: Örebro, Sweden
- Coordinates: 59.2726°N 15.2086°E
- Groundbreaking: 1930
- Opened: 2 April 1932

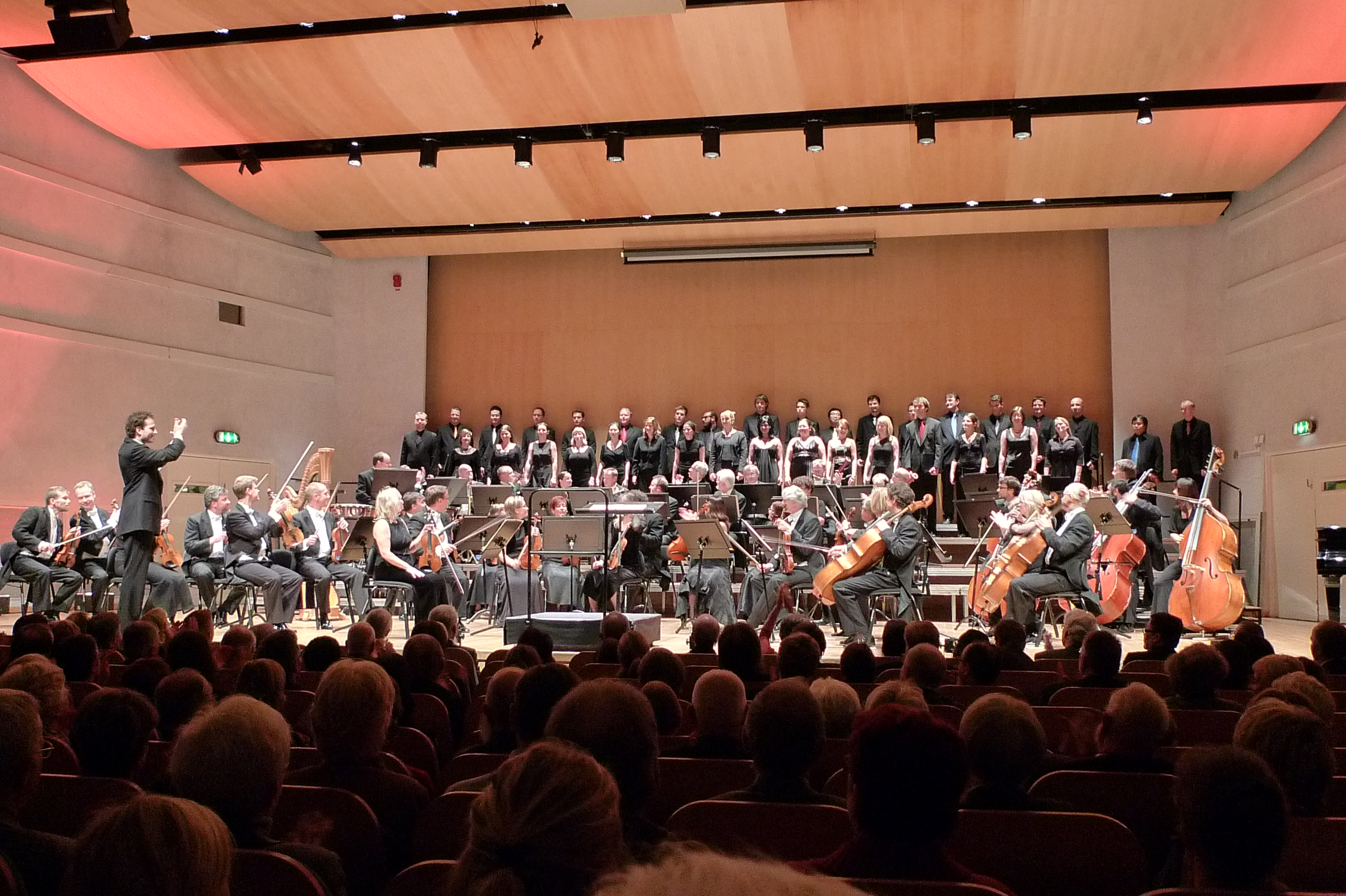
Inside the Örebro Concert Hall.

The Örebro Concert Hall (Swedish: Örebro konserthus) is a concert hall located in Örebro, Sweden. It was built between 1930 and 1932. The hall can accommodate 723 people. Notable past performers include Budgie and Elvis Costello.
