= Helga =

- Gender: Female

Origin
- Origin: Old Norse
- Meaning: "holy", "blessed"

Other names
- Related names: Hælga, Helge, Helgi, Hege, Hæge, Helja, Helle, Helka, Oili, Olga

Helga (from Old Norse heilagr 'holy, blessed') is a female name, used mainly in Scandinavia, German-speaking countries and the Low Countries (Hege, Helle, Helge, Helga, Helka or Oili). The name was in use in England before the Norman Conquest, but appears to have died out afterwards. It was re-introduced to English-speaking nations in the 20th century from Germany, the Netherlands, and the Nordic countries. Scandinavian male equivalent is Helge, or Helgi. Eastern Slavic names Olga (Ольга) and Oleg (Олег) are derived from it.

Name days: Estonia - May 31, Hungary - October 3, Latvia - October 9, Sweden - November 21, Finland - May 31, Greece - 11 July

Helga was among the most popular names for girls in Germany from the 1920s to the 1950s.

== People ==
All of last names listed in alphabetical order:

=== A ===
- Helga Adler (born 1943), East German historian and politician
- Helga de Alvear (1936–2025), German art collector
- Helga Amesberger, Austrian ethnologist and sociologist
- Helga Ancher (1883–1964), Danish painter
- Helga Anders (1948–1986), German-Austrian actress
- Helga Aradóttir (1538–1614), granddaughter of executed Icelandic bishop Jón Arason
- Helga Arendt (1964–2013), West German sprinter
- Helga Axt, German chess player

=== B ===
- Helga Bachmann (1931–2011), Icelandic actress and director
- Helga Baum (born 1954), German mathematician
- Helga Bergvall (1907–1978), Swedish author
- Helga Beyer (1920–1941), German resistance fighter
- Helga Bîrsan (1928–2004), Romanian gymnast
- Helga Braathen (1953–1982), Norwegian artistic gymnast
- Helga de la Brache (1817–1885), Swedish con artist
- Helga Brauer, East German singer
- Helga Brofeldt (1881–1968), Swedish film actress

=== C ===
- Helga Correia (born 1977), Portuguese politician
- Helga von Cramm (1840–1919), German–Swiss painter, illustrator, and graphic artist
- Helga Cranston (1921–2013), German film editor

=== D ===
- Helga Dagsland (1910–2003), Norwegian nurse and organizational leader
- Helga Dancberga (1941–2019), Soviet then Latvian actress
- Helga Davis, New York-based multidisciplinary artist
- Helga Deen (1925–1943), Jewish diarist and Holocaust victim
- Helga Dernesch (born 1939), Austrian soprano and mezzo-soprano
- Helga Diederichsen (1930–2005), Mexican swimmer
- Helga Diercks-Norden (1924–2011), German journalist and feminist activist
- Helga Dietrich (1940–2018), German orchidologist and author
- Helga Dudzinski (1929–2022), German figure skater

=== E ===
- Helga Einsele (1910–2005), German criminologist, prison director, and high-profile prisons reformer
- Helga Eng (1875–1966), Norwegian psychologist and educationalist
- Helga Erhart, Austrian para-alpine skier
- Helga Estby (1860–1942), American suffragist
- Helga Exner (born 1939), Czech-born Danish goldsmith

=== F ===
- Helga Fägerskiöld (1871–1958), Swedish baroness
- Helga Feddersen (1930–1990), German actress
- Helga Flatland (born 1984), Norwegian novelist and children's writer
- Helga Foght (1902–1974), Danish textile artist
- Helga Forner (1936–2004), professor of singing
- Helga Franck (1933–1963), German stage and film actress
- Helga Frier (1893–1972), Danish actress

=== G ===
- Helga Gill, Women Suffrage Society Organizer
- Helga Gitmark (1929–2008), Norwegian politician
- Helga Glöckner-Neubert (1938–2017), German writer
- Helga Gnauer (1929–1990), Austrian fencer
- Helga Goebbels (1932–1945), eldest daughter of Nazi propaganda minister Joseph Goebbels and Magda Goebbels
- Helga Goetze (1922–2008), German artist, writer, and free love activist
- Helga Göring (1922–2010), German stage, television, and film actress
- Helga Görlin, Swedish soprano and voice teacher
- Helga Grebing (1930–2017), German historian and university professor
- Helga Guitton (born 1942), German radio announcer
- Helga Gunerius Eriksen (born 1950), Norwegian novelist and children's writer

=== H ===
- Helga Haase (1934–1989), Polish-born speed skater in East Germany
- Helga Hahnemann (1937–1991), East German multi-faceted stage performer and entertainer
- Helga Halldórsdóttir (born 1963), Icelandic hurdler
- Helga Haller von Hallerstein (1927–2017), German countess and politician
- Helga Haugen (1932–2024), Norwegian politician
- Helga Haugland Byfuglien (born 1950), Norwegian bishop
- Helga Helgesen (1863–1936), Norwegian domestic science teacher and politician
- Helga Hellebrand-Wiedermann (1930–2013), Austrian sprint canoer
- Helga Henning (1937–2018), German sprinter
- Helga Henselder-Barzel (1940–1995), German political scientist
- Helga Hernes (born 1938), German-born Norwegian political scientist, diplomat, and politician
- Helga Hoffmann (born 1937), German track and field athlete
- Helga Holbek or Holbeck (1897–1983), Danish humanitarian activist
- Helga Hörz (born 1935), German Marxist philosopher and women's rights activist
- Helga Hošková-Weissová (born 1929), Czech artist and Holocaust survivor

=== I ===
- Helga Nadire İnan Ertürk (born 1984), Turkish-German footballer
- Helga Ingólfsdóttir (1942–2009), Icelandic harpsichordist and festival director

=== J ===
- Helga Jensine Waabenø (1908–1994), Norwegian nurse and Lutheran missionary
- Helga Jónsdóttir (born 1957), professor in nursing

=== K ===
- Helga Karlsen (1882–1936), Norwegian politician
- Helga Klein (1931–2021), German athlete
- Helga Kleiner (born 1935), German politician
- Helga Knapp, former Austrian Paralympic alpine skier
- Helga Koch (born 1942), German fencer
- Helga Kohl (born 1943), Polish-born photographer based in Namibia
- Helga Königsdorf (1938–2014), German mathematician and author
- Helga Konrad (born 1948), Austrian politician
- Helga W. Kraft, German-American professor
- Helga Krapf (born 1988), Filipina actress
- Helga Krause (1935–1989), German film editor
- Helga Kreuter-Eggemann (1914–1970), German art historian
- Helga Kühn-Mengel (born 1947), German politician
- Helga Kuhse, Australian philosopher
- Helga Kurm (1920–2011), Estonian pedagogical scientist

=== L ===
- Helga Labs (born 1940), East German politician
- Helga Landauer (born 1969), Russian director, writer, and poet, based in New York City
- Helga Larsen (1884–1947), Danish trade unionist and pioneering politician
- Helga van Leur (born 1970), Dutch meteorologist
- Helga Leitner, Austrian geographer
- Helga Lie (1930–2019), Norwegian politician
- Helga Lindner (1951–2021), German swimmer
- Helga Liné (born 1932), Portuguese-Spanish film actress and circus acrobat
- Helga Livytska, Ukrainian humanitarian and public figure
- Helga Lopez (1952–2022), German politician
- Helga Luber, former East German slalom canoeist
- Helga Lütten (born 1961), German former professional tennis player

=== M ===
- Helga Martin (1940–1999), German film actress
- Helga Matschkur (born 1943), German gymnast
- Helga Mees (1937–2014), German fencer
- Helga Moddansdóttir, Haakon Paulsson's mistress
- Helga Molander (1896–1986), German actress
- Helga Moreira (born 1950), Portuguese poet
- Helga de la Motte-Haber (born 1938), German musicologist
- Helga Mucke-Wittbrodt (1910–1999), German physician
- Helga Mühlberg-Ulze, East German sprint canoeist
- Helga Müller, German luger

=== N ===
- Helga Németh (born 1973), Hungarian handball player
- Helga Neuner (born 1940), German actress
- Helga Newmark (1932–2012), first female Holocaust survivor ordained as a rabbi
- Helga Niemann (born 1956), German former swimmer
- Helga Niessen Masthoff (born 1941), retired West German tennis player
- Helga Nõu (born 1934), Estonian writer
- Helga M. Novak (1935–2013), German-Icelandic writer
- Helga Nowotny (born 1937), Austrian university professor emeritus

=== O-Ö ===
- Helga Offen (1951–2020), German volleyball player
- Helga Margrét Ögmundsdóttir (born 1948), Icelandic former professor

=== P ===
- Helga Pakasaar, Canada-based contemporary art curator and writer
- Helga Paris (1938–2024), German photographer
- Helga Pedersen, several people
- Helga Pichler, Italian luger
- Helga Pilarczyk (1925–2011), German operatic soprano
- Helga Plumb (born 1939), Austrian-born Canadian architect
- Helga Pogatschar (born 1966), German composer

=== R ===
- Helga E. Rafelski (1949–2000), German particle physicist
- Helga Radtke (born 1962), German track and field athlete
- Helga Ramstad (1875–1956), Norwegian politician
- Helga Richter, retired German rower
- Helga Marie Ring Reusch (1865–1944), Norwegian painter
- Helga Rivas (born 1969), Colombian architect and specialist in urban design
- Helga Ruebsamen (1934–2016), Dutch writer
- Helga Rullestad (born 1949), Norwegian politician
- Helga Rut Guðmundsdóttir (born 1970), Icelandic professor of music education

=== S ===
- Helga Salvesen (1963–2016), Norwegian physician and professor of medicine
- Helga Schauerte-Maubouet (born 1957), German-French organist, writer, and music editor
- Helga Schmid (born 1960), German diplomat
- Helga Schmidt-Neuber (1937–2018), German swimmer
- Helga Schneider (born 1937), Italian writer of German origin
- Helga Schubert (born 1940), German psychologist and author
- Helga Schuchardt (born 1939), German politician
- Helga Schultze (1940–2015), German female tennis player
- Helga Seibert (1939–1999), judge at Bundesverfassungsgericht
- Helga Seidler (born 1949), German athlete and Olympic medalist
- Helga Sigurðardóttir (born 1969), Icelandic swimmer
- Helga María Sista (born 1947), Argentine alpine skier
- Helga Slessarev, scholar of German literature
- Helga Sommerfeld (1941–1991), German actress
- Helga Sonck-Majewski (1916–2015), Finnish artist
- Helga Stene (1904–1983), Norwegian educator, feminist, and resistance member
- Helga Stentzel, Russian-born visual artist
- Helga Stephenson, Canadian media executive
- Helga Steudel (born 1939), German motorcyclist and car racer
- Helga Stevens, Belgian politician
- Helga Stroh (born 1938), German fencer

=== T ===
- Helga Tawil-Souri (born 1969), Palestinian-American media scholar and documentary filmmaker
- Helga Testorf, subject of Andrew Wyeth's famous paintings
- Helga Thaler Ausserhofer (born 1952), Italian politician
- Helga Thomas (1891–1988), Swedish film actress
- Helle Thorning-Schmidt (born 1966), 41st Prime Minister of Denmark
- Helga Timm (1924–2014), German politician
- Helga Charlotte Tolle, German actress, singer and dancer
- Helga Margrét Þorsteinsdóttir (born 1991), Icelandic heptathlete
- Helga Trüpel (born 1958), German politician (Bündnis 90/Die Grünen)

=== V ===
- Helga Vala Helgadóttir (born 1972), Icelandic politician
- Helga Varden, Norwegian-American philosopher
- Helga María Vilhjálmsdóttir (born 1995), Icelandic alpine skier
- Helga Vlahović (1945–2012), Croatian journalist, producer, and television personality

=== W ===
- Helga Wagner (born 1956), German former swimmer
- Helga Wanglie (1903–1991), elderly woman in a persistent vegetative state
- Helga Weippert (1943–2019), German Old Testament scholar
- Helga Weisz (born 1961), Austrian industrial ecologist, climate scientist, and professor of industrial ecology and climate change
- Helga Wex (1924–1986), German politician

=== Z ===
- Helga Zepp-LaRouche (born 1948), German journalist and politician
- Helga Zimmermann (born 1942), German former swimmer
- Helga Josephine Zinnbauer (1909–1980), Australian community worker and librarian
- Helga Zoega (born 1976), Icelandic professor of public health
- Helga Zöllner (1941–1983), Hungarian figure skater

== Fictional characters ==
- Helga the Fair, a character in Gunnlaugs saga ormstungu
- Helga Jace, a character in DC Comics
- Helga Pataki, a character in the Nickelodeon animated TV series Hey Arnold!

== Other ==
- Helga, one of the two phantom torsos carried by the Artemis 1 mission
