= Erla (disambiguation) =

Erla is a municipality in Spain.

Erla may also refer to:

== People ==
=== Given name ===
- Erla Bergendahl Hohler
- Erla Steina Arnardóttir
- Erla Dögg Haraldsdóttir
- Margrét Erla Maack
- Erla Stefánsdóttir
- Erla Bolladottir
- Erla Ásgeirsdóttir
- Erla Þorsteinsdóttir (disambiguation)
  - Erla Þorsteinsdóttir (basketball)
  - Erla Þorsteinsdóttir (singer)
- Jórunn Erla Eyfjörð
- Erla Kolbrún Svavarsdóttir

=== Surname ===
- Mason Erla, American baseball pitcher
- Wolfger von Erla

== Other ==
- Erla Ironworks, Germany
