= Hege =

Hege may be a given name or a surname. Its given name version is the short form of Helga.

== People with the given name ==
- Hege Bøkko (born 1991), Norwegian long-track speedskater
- Hege Brannsten (born 1972), Norwegian sprint canoeist
- Hege R. Eriksen (born 1965), Norwegian research director and professor
- Hege Frøseth (born 1969), Norwegian handball player
- Hege Gunnerød (born 1973), Norwegian footballer
- Hege Hansen (born 1990), Norwegian footballer
- Hege Jensen (born 1971), Norwegian politician
- Hege Kvitsand (born 1973), Norwegian handball player
- Hege Haukeland Liadal (born 1972), Norwegian politician
- Hege Løken (born 1993), Norwegian handball player
- Hege Nerland (1966–2007), Norwegian politician
- Hege Peikli (born 1957), Norwegian cross-country skier
- Hege Anett Pettersson (born 1973), Norwegian handball player
- Hege Reitan, Norwegian sport wrestler
- Hege Riise (born 1969), Norwegian footballer
- Hege Schøyen (born 1957), Norwegian singer, actor and comedian
- Hege Skjeie (1955–2018), Norwegian political scientist and feminist
- Hege Søfteland (born 1959), Norwegian politician
- Hege Lanes Steinlund (born 1969), Norwegian referee
- Hege Stendahl (born 1967), Norwegian cyclist
- Hege Storhaug (born 1962), Norwegian journalist, author and political activist
- Hege Tunaal (born 1948), Norwegian singer
- Hege Christin Vikebø (born 1978), Norwegian handball player
- Hege Bakken Wahlquist (born 1992), Norwegian handball player

== People with the surname ==
- Daniel Hege, American orchestral conductor
- Gerald Hege (born 1948), American sheriff

== See also ==
- Louis Van Hege (1889–1975), Belgian footballer
- Heger, people with this surname
- Hegen (surname), people with this surname
