= Helga (disambiguation) =

Helga is a feminine given name.

Helga may also refer to:

- Helga (call), a running gag at German concerts and festivals
- Helga – Vom Werden des menschlichen Lebens, a 1967 West German film
- Helga (crater), a crater on Venus
- 522 Helga, a minor planet orbiting the Sun
- HMY Helga, later the Irish patrol vessel Muirchú, a Royal Navy ship active during the Easter Rising of 1916
- SS Helga, a Danish cargo ship in service 1933-38
- Hurricane Helga, a 1966 Pacific hurricane
- Tropical Storm Helga, a 1970 Pacific tropical storm
- Tropical Storm Helga, a 1974 Pacific tropical storm
