= The Story of the Last Thought =

1989 novel by Edgar Hilsenrath

- German edition (2005)
- Author: Edgar Hilsenrath
- Original title: Das Märchen vom letzten Gedanken
- Language: German
- Genre: Historical, War novel
- Publisher: Piper
- Publication date: 1989
- Publication place: Germany
- Media type: Print (Hardback & Paperback)

The novel The Story of the Last Thought (in German Das Märchen vom letzten Gedanken) of the German-Jewish writer Edgar Hilsenrath is about the Armenian genocide in 1915. The epic which has the form of a fairy tale (Märchen) and for which Hilsenrath received many prizes is regarded as the most important book about this historical episode. In 2006 the president of Armenia presented the author with the State Award for Literature of the Republic of Armenia for his work.

== Content ==
The Story of the Last Thought is the history of a village in Anatolia that is being destroyed by the Turks. The main character is the Armenian Wartan Khatisian, whose son Thovma is dying. His last thought — the last thought of a man, the fairy tale says, is beyond time — is being told the history of his ancestors, the life of suffering of the Armenian people. The storyteller Meddah guides the last thought of Thovma along the life paths of his father, that lead from a small idyllic mountain village into the torture chambers of the Turkish rulers, and let him become a witness of the big pogrom against the Armenians in 1915. "By means of an oriental fairy tale, and drawing from sagas and legends of this distressed nation, Hilsenrath goes far back into Armenian history and touches upon the plight of all genocide victims. A cruel book and nevertheless a book of love, of hope and of wonders." (Cover text) Despite choosing a fictitious genre, the historical facts have been carefully investigated and verified by the author.

Translated into Armenian by Lili Ter-Minasyan.

== Awards ==
For his epic The Story of the Last Thought Edgar Hilsenrath has received many prizes. In 1989 Günter Grass presented him with the prestigious Alfred Döblin prize. In 2006 the president of Armenia, where Hilsenrath is regarded as a national hero, honoured him with the State Award for Literature of the Republic of Armenia for his work. Also in 2006 he received an Honorary Doctorate from the Yerevan State University for his work.

== Reception and debate ==
After the first publication of Hilsenrath's novel (in Germany in 1989) the critic Alexander von Bormann wrote in the Swiss newspaper Neue Zürcher Zeitung with regard to Franz Werfel's The Forty Days of Musa Dagh, the novel that had previously been considered to be the most important book about Armenia in world literature: "But I think Hilsenrath's novel is significantly superior to Werfel's: it is a historic and poetic novel at the same time."

According to Dagmar C. G. Lorenz, "Hilsenrath's Marchen vom letzten Gedanken is a powerful artistic statement against all forms of oppression. In addition to racism and nationalist arrogance, Hilsenrath isolates inequality, poverty, and ignorance, but above all, dishonesty, as factors contributing to genocide. The dynamics of oppression and submission are present in all enclaves of society and thus difficult to combat, although Hilsenrath argues that to avoid further genocides they must be eradicated."

Manfred Orlick judged: "Over and over they say: one cannot write about this topic like this. But the author has managed to delineate the cruelties through innumerable short dialogues, to portray them movingly and in this way get across the historical facts. An inhuman book of fairy tales, as only Hilsenrath could write it."

The author himself considers The Story of the Last Thought to be his most poetic work.

The English translation was published in Great Britain in 1990 (paperback 1994).
