= Recurrent tensor =

In mathematics and physics, a recurrent tensor, with respect to a connection $\nabla$ on a manifold M, is a tensor T for which there is a one-form ω on M such that

$$\nabla T = \omega\otimes T. \,$$

== Examples ==
=== Parallel Tensors ===
An example for recurrent tensors are parallel tensors which are defined by

$$\nabla A = 0$$

with respect to some connection $\nabla$.

If we take a pseudo-Riemannian manifold $(M,g)$ then the metric g is a parallel and therefore recurrent tensor with respect to its Levi-Civita connection, which is defined via

$$\nabla^{LC} g = 0$$

and its property to be torsion-free.

Parallel vector fields ($\nabla X = 0$) are examples of recurrent tensors that find importance in mathematical research. For example, if $X$ is a recurrent non-null vector field on a pseudo-Riemannian manifold satisfying

$$\nabla X = \omega\otimes X$$

for some closed one-form $\omega$, then X can be rescaled to a parallel vector field. In particular, non-parallel recurrent vector fields are null vector fields.

=== Metric space ===
Another example appears in connection with Weyl structures. Historically, Weyl structures emerged from the considerations of Hermann Weyl with regards to properties of parallel transport of vectors and their length. By demanding that a manifold have an affine parallel transport in such a way that the manifold is locally an affine space, it was shown that the induced connection had a vanishing torsion tensor

$$T^\nabla(X,Y) = \nabla_XY-\nabla_YX - [X,Y] = 0$$.

Additionally, he claimed that the manifold must have a particular parallel transport in which the ratio of two transported vectors is fixed. The corresponding connection $\nabla'$ which induces such a parallel transport satisfies

$$\nabla' g = \varphi \otimes g$$

for some one-form $\varphi$. Such a metric is a recurrent tensor with respect to $\nabla'$. As a result, Weyl called the resulting manifold $(M,g)$ with affine connection $\nabla$ and recurrent metric $g$ a metric space. In this sense, Weyl was not just referring to one metric but to the conformal structure defined by $g$.

Under the conformal transformation $g \rightarrow e^{\lambda}g$, the form $\varphi$ transforms as $\varphi \rightarrow \varphi -d\lambda$. This induces a canonical map $F:[g] \rightarrow \Lambda^1(M)$ on $(M, [g])$ defined by

$$F(e^\lambda g) := \varphi - d\lambda$$,

where $[g]$ is the conformal structure. $F$ is called a Weyl structure, which more generally is defined as a map with property

$$F(e^\lambda g) = F(g) - d\lambda$$.

=== Recurrent spacetime ===
One more example of a recurrent tensor is the curvature tensor $\mathcal{R}$ on a recurrent spacetime, for which

$$\nabla \mathcal{R} = \omega \otimes \mathcal{R}$$.

== Literature ==
- Weyl, H. (1918). "Gravitation und Elektrizität". Sitzungsberichte der Preuss. Akad. D. Wiss.: 465–478. Reprinted in Das Relativitätsprinzip: Eine Sammlung von Originalarbeiten zur Relativitätstheorie Einsteins (1923), Wiesbaden: Vieweg+Teubner Verlag, pp. 147–159, doi:10.1007/978-3-663-19510-8_11.
- Walker, A. G. (1949). "On parallel fields of partially null vector spaces". The Quarterly Journal of Mathematics. Oxford Series. 20: 135–145. doi:10.1093/qmath/os-20.1.135. MR 0033588.
- Patterson, E. M. (1951). "On symmetric recurrent tensors of the second order". The Quarterly Journal of Mathematics. Second Series. 2: 151–158. doi:10.1093/qmath/2.1.151. MR 0042771.
- Wong, Yung-chow (1961). "Recurrent tensors on a linearly connected differentiable manifold". Transactions of the American Mathematical Society. 99: 325–341. doi:10.1090/S0002-9947-1961-0121751-2. JSTOR 1993404. MR 0121751.
- Folland, Gerald B. (1970). "Weyl manifolds". Journal of Differential Geometry. 4: 145–153. doi:10.4310/jdg/1214429379. MR 0264542.
- D.V. Alekseevky; H. Baum (2008). Recent developments in pseudo-Riemannian geometry. European Mathematical Society. ISBN 978-3-03719-051-7.
