= Erich Feigl =

Austrian documentary producer and genocide denialist

- Born: 24 September 1931; Vienna, Austria
- Died: 27 January 2007 (aged 75)
- Occupations: Film producer and author

Erich Feigl (24 September 1931 – 27 January 2007) was an Austrian documentary film producer and author. He produced almost 60 documentaries, mostly for the Austrian ORF but some for BR (Bavarian), ZDF (German) and TRT (Turkish Radio Television) in co-production. He authored books about the Habsburgs, whose restoration he supported, and two books on the myths and misinformation surrounding the topic of Armenian genocide, which he denied until his death.

== Biography ==
Erich Feigl was born in Vienna, Austria. He began writing while still a student, but soon switched over to documentary film-making, continuing his career at Austrian State Television (ORF). He toured the Middle and Near East and Western Asia extensively and produced many documentaries about these places and their cultures and religions ("Journey to the Early Christian World", "Men and Myths"). He worked with the Dalai Lama on various projects ("Bardo", "Rebirth").

Feigl became interested in Turkic cultures and history, especially ("Kanuni Sultan"). After the wave of assassinations against Turkish diplomats in Europe and USA in 70s and 80s, carried out by Armenian nationalist groups (List of Turkish diplomats assassinated by Armenian militant organisations), in 1984 he began writing about the Armenian genocide and challenged the commonly accepted views, and he subsequently also focused his attention on Kurdish issues and the PKK guerrilla organization, which resulted in his book published under the title Die Kurden in 1995. He was one of the first authors and commentators to investigate this topic in a contemporary context. He also wrote about the history of the Habsburgs ("Kaiser Karl", "Kaiserin Zita").

Feigl was a long-time monarchist activist, and in 2006 was awarded honorary membership of the Black-Yellow Alliance, which favors the return of the House of Habsburg to power. Described by Der Spiegel as a "fervent admirer" of Empress Zita, he was part of the monarchist committee which organized her funeral in 1989.

Feigl received the Medal for the Progress of the Republic of Azerbaijan and was an honorary board member of the Congress of European Azeris.

Feigl had died of kidney failure after being hospitalised for a stomach hemorrhage. He was cremated at Feuerhalle Simmering, with his ashes being buried on February 5 at Simmering Cemetery in Vienna.

== A Myth of Terror ==
In 1986 Feigl became well known after the publication of his book A Myth of Terror: Armenian Extremism: Its Causes and Its Historical Context. In the book's introduction, Feigl writes he had written it as a response to the murder of close friend and Turkish labour attaché, Erdoğan Özen, by the members of the Armenian Revolutionary Army. Initially published in German, an English version was later produced. Complimentary copies of the book were distributed by Turkish organisations to US governmental officials, university libraries and individuals. A short time before he died he finished his last book, called Armenian Mythomania.

Dagmar Lorenz, in a book review of author Edgar Hilsenrath for the Simon Wiesenthal Center Annual, notes Feigl as a supporter of "Turkish cryptofascist anti-Armenian propaganda" and condemns A Myth of Terror as a "revisionist publication" that "abounds with misleading details".

Feigl's work was also criticized by Klas-Göran Karlsson for misinterpretations.

== Honours and awards ==
- Austrian Cross of Honour for Science and Art (1990)
- Gold Medal of Honour of the Land of Vienna
- Silver Medal of the city of Vienna
- Gold Decoration for Services to the province of Lower Austria
- Knight of the Order of Saint Lazarus
- Knight of the Sacred Military Constantinian Order of Saint George

== Works ==
=== Books ===
- Erich Feigl (2008). Seidenstrasse durchs Feuerland : die Geschichte Aserbaidschans. Wien: Amalthea Signum. ISBN 978-3-85002-667-3.
- an illustrated exposé by Erich Feigl. (2007). Armenian Mythomania. Wien: Amalthea Signum. ISBN 978-3-85002-583-6.
- Erich Feigl. Mit einem Vorw. von Karl von Habsburg-Lothringen (2006). Gott erhalte … - Kaiser Karl : persönliche Aufzeichnungen und Dokumente. Wien: Amalthea. ISBN 3-85002-520-9.
- Erich Feigl. (1999). Turkey, Europe and Public Opinion: A Myth of Error. Wien: Amalthea. ISBN 3-85002-423-7.
- Als Österreich die Welt benannte-- : eine Ausstellung des Marchfelder Schlösservereins : Schlosshof im Marchfeld, 30. März bis 3. November 1996. Engelhartstetten: Marchfelder Schlösserverein. 1996. OCLC 40290660.
- Erich Feigl. (1995). Die Kurden. Geschichte und Schicksal eines Volkes. Wien: Universitas-Verlag. ISBN 3-8004-1322-1.
- Erich Feigl (1993). Halbmond und Kreuz : Marco d'Aviano und die Rettung Europas. Wien: Amalthea. ISBN 3-85002-326-5.
- Erich Feigl (1992). Otto von Habsburg. Profil eines Lebens. Wien: Amalthea. ISBN 3-85002-327-3.
- Erich Feigl (1991). Zita, Kaiserin und Königin. Wien: Amalthea. ISBN 3-85002-307-9.
- Erich Feigl. (1990). Kaiser Karl I. Ein Leben für den Frieden seiner Völker. Wien: Amalthea. ISBN 3-85002-291-9.
- Erich Feigl. (1989). Kaiserin Zita. Kronzeugin eines Jahrhunderts. Wien: Amalthea. ISBN 3-85002-277-3.
- Erich Feigl. (1987). Otto von Habsburg : Protokoll eines politischen Lebens. Wien: Amalthea. ISBN 3-85002-244-7. OCLC 242216843.
- Ein Mythos des Terrors. Armenischer Terrorismus, seine Ursachen und Hintergründe. Freilassing, Salzburg: Edition Zeitgeschichte. 1986. OCLC 74834465.
  - Also published in English as: A Myth of Terror, Armenian Extremism: Its Causes and Its Historical Context, 1986. OCLC 24848929
  - Translated to Turkish as Bir terör efsanesi, published by Milliyet Yayınları in 1987. OCLC 20483515
  - Translated to French as Un mythe de la terreur : l'extrémisme arménien: ses causes et ses origines; une documentation illustrée Salzburg : Druckhaus Nonntal, 1991. ISBN 3-85453-013-7
  - Pravda o terrore : armi︠a︡nskiĭ terrorizm—istoki i prichiny Baku : Azerbaĭdzhanskoe gos. izd-vo, 2000. OCLC 63146231
  - La mitomanía Armenia : el extremismo Armenio: causas y contexto histórico Freilassing; Salzburg : Edition Zeitgeschichte, 2007. OCLC 301562113
- Erich Feigl. (1985). Musil von Arabien. Vorkämpfer der islamischen Welt. Wien: Amalthea. ISBN 3-85002-199-8.
- herausgegeben von Erich Feigl. (1984). Kaiser Karl : persönliche Aufzeichnungen, Zeugnisse und Dokumente. Wien: Amalthea. ISBN 3-85002-179-3.
- Halbmond und Kreuz. Marco d'Aviano und die Rettung Europas. Amalthea, Wien 1983, ISBN 3-85002-326-5
- Erich Feigl. (1982). Vorhölle zum Paradies. Wien: Zsolnay. ISBN 3-552-03400-5. OCLC 9945391.
- Kaiserin Zita : von Österreich nach Österreich. Wein: Amalthea. 1982. ISBN 9783850020855. OCLC 10992388.
  - Translated to French as Zita de Habsburg : mémoires d'un empire disparu, Paris : Criterion, 1991 OCLC 25465676
- Erich Feigl (1977). Zita: Legende und Wahrheit. Vienna: Amalthea Verlag. p. 547. ISBN 3-85002-307-9. OCLC 8115027.
- Der militärische und hospitalische Orden des hl. Lazarus von Jerusalem : Memento. Wien: Kanzleramt des Grosspriorates v. Österreich des Ordre militaire et hospitalier de Saint-Lazare de Jérusalem. 1974. OCLC 4858479.

=== Films ===
- Reise in die frühchristliche Welt and Die Erben der frühchristlichen Welt
- Die Weltreligionen: Buddhismus, Hinduismus, Schintoismus, Islam, Christentum
- Ein Tropentraum
- Der Goldschatz
- Menschen und Mythen (Die Sikhs, die Parsen, das Bardo etc.)
- Kaiserin Zita and Otto von Habsburg and Alois Musil (about Syria, Iraq),
- Die Religionen des Zweistromlandes („An den Strömen des Paradieses“),
- Wenn die Götter lieben in the Wasser ist Macht project
- A myth of terror (about ASALA actions)
- Die Wiedergeburt and Bardo and Buddhismus (about the Dalai Lama)
