= Bergwall =

Bergwall is a surname. Notable people with the surname include:

- Andreas Bergwall (born 1974), Swedish bandy player
- Marcus Bergwall (born 1971), Swedish bandy player, brother of Andreas
- Sture Bergwall (born 1950), Swede convicted of eight murders but later acquitted of all

== See also ==
- Bergvall
