= Eric Feigl =

Eric Feigl is a misnomer, which may refer to:

- Eric Feigl-Ding (born 1983), American public health scientist
- Erich Feigl (1931–2007), Austrian documentary film producer and author
