= Svavarsdóttir =

Svavarsdóttir is an Icelandic surname. Notable people with the surname include:

- Erla Kolbrún Svavarsdóttir (born 1961), Icelandic professor
- Svandís Svavarsdóttir (born 1964), Icelandic politician
