= Helle (name) =

Female given name and family name

Helle is both a feminine given name and a surname. In Scandinavia, it is a variant of the feminine given name Helga. Notable people with the name include:

== Given name ==
- Helle (mythology) who gave her name to the Hellespont
- Helle Aro (born 1960), Estonian heptathlete
- Helle Crafts (1947–1986), Danish murder victim
- Helle Fagralid (born 1976), Danish actress
- Helle Frederiksen (born 1981), Danish professional triathlete
- Helle-Reet Helenurm (1944–2003), Estonian actress
- Helle Helle (born 1965), Danish writer
- Helle-Moonika Helme (born 1966), Estonian musician and politician
- Helle Kalda (born 1950), Estonian politician
- Helle Klein (born 1966), Swedish journalist
- Helle Kuningas (1949–2014), Estonian actress
- Helle Meri (born 1949), Estonian actress, former First Lady of Estonia
- Helle Metslang (born 1950), Estonian linguist
- Helle Michaelsen (born 1968), Danish model
- Helle Rotbøll (born 1963), Danish footballer
- Helle Stangerup (1939–2015), Danish novelist
- Helle Thorning-Schmidt (born 1966), Prime Minister of Denmark (2011–2015)
- Helle Trevino (born 1975), Danish IFBB professional bodybuilder
- Helle Virkner (1925–2009), Danish actress

== Surname ==
- Anton thor Helle (1683–1748), Baltic German Lutheran clergyman, linguist and Bible translator
- Helle Helle (born 1965), Danish writer
- Henri Helle (1873–1901), French archer
- Horst Helle (1934–2026), German sociologist and academic
- Knut Helle (1930–2015), Norwegian historian and academic
- Soini Helle (1914–1992), Finnish chess player
- Veikko Helle (1911–2005), Finnish politician
