= Magnús Blöndal Jóhannsson =

Icelandic composer, pianist and conductor

Magnús Blöndal Jóhannsson (8 September 1925 - 1 January 2005) was an Icelandic composer, pianist and conductor.

Jóhannsson studied with Franz Mixa and Victor Urbancic at the Reykjavík College of Music (1935–7, 1939–45) and with Bernard Wagenaar and Marion Bauer at the Juilliard School (1947–53). He was active as répétiteur and conductor at the Icelandic National Theater (1956–61), and was a producer at the Icelandic State Broadcasting Service (RÚV) until 1974.

In the 1950s and early 60s, Jóhannsson was at the forefront of the Icelandic avant-garde. He was a founding member of the Icelandic new-music collective Musica Nova in 1959. His Fjórar abstraksjónir (‘'Four Abstractions’', 1950) for piano was the first Icelandic 12-note composition; he was also a pioneer in electronic music, composing his Elektrónísk stúdía (Electronic Study) for woodwind quintet, piano and tape in 1958. Working with very limited resources at the Icelandic National Radio, he composed the tape work Constellation in 1961, a key work in his output. The critical reception of his work during the 1960s, including the modernist orchestral work Punktar (1962) and Sonorities I for piano (1963) was negative and quite harsh. Yet Jóhannsson also had a lyrical vein, as is best exemplified in the vocalise Sveitin milli sanda, originally composed for a documentary film in 1962 and by far his most popular work.

In 1971 Jóhannsson stopped composing for almost a decade; this extended silence was eventually broken with his Adagio (1980) for strings, celesta and percussion, which marks a significant stylistic shift in his music. Like the works which followed, it abandons his earlier experimental style for a more simple, neo-romantic lyricism. After a period in the United States, (1977–87), he took up residence again in Iceland.

In 1995 Jóhannson handed over his works to the National and University Library of Iceland for preservation. In August 2004, only a few months before his death, the Icelandic film maker Ari Alexander Ergis Magnússon taped an interview with him which later became the basis for a documentary on his life and works.

== Selected works ==
- Barnalög (The Early Years) for piano (1948)
- Fjórar abstraksjónir (Four Abstractions) for piano (1950)
- Ionization for organ (1957)
- Elektrónísk stúdía (Electronic Study) for winds, piano, and tape (1960)
- 15 Minigrams (15 tóndæmi) for flute, oboe, clarinet, and bassoon (1960)
- Constellation (Samstirni) for tape (1961)
- Dimension for violin solo (1961)
- Punktar (Points) for orchestra and electronics (1961–62)
- Sonorities I for piano (1963)
- Sonorities II for piano (1968)
- Adagio for strings, celeste, and percussion (1980)
- Solitude for flute solo (1983)

== Selected recordings ==
- Sveitin milli sanda. Elly Vilhjálms and orchestra. SG-hljómplötur, 1965.
- Adagio for strings, celeste, and percussion. On Four Icelandic Orchestral Works. Iceland Symphony Orchestra, cond. Petri Sakari. Iceland Music Information Center, 1987.
- Solitude. Manuela Wiesler, flute. BIS, 1989.
- Dimension. Icelandic Music for Solo Violin. Rut Ingólfsdóttir, violin. Iceland Music Information Center, 1998.
- Elektrónísk stúdía (archival recordings). Smekkleysa: 2000.
- Í rökkri. Songs. Ásgerður Júníusdóttir, mezzo-soprano; Árni Heimir Ingólfsson, piano. Smekkleysa, 2006.
- Solitude. Stefán Ragnar Höskuldsson, flute. Delos, 2015.
