= Edgar Hilsenrath =

German-Jewish writer & Holocaust survivor (1926-2018)

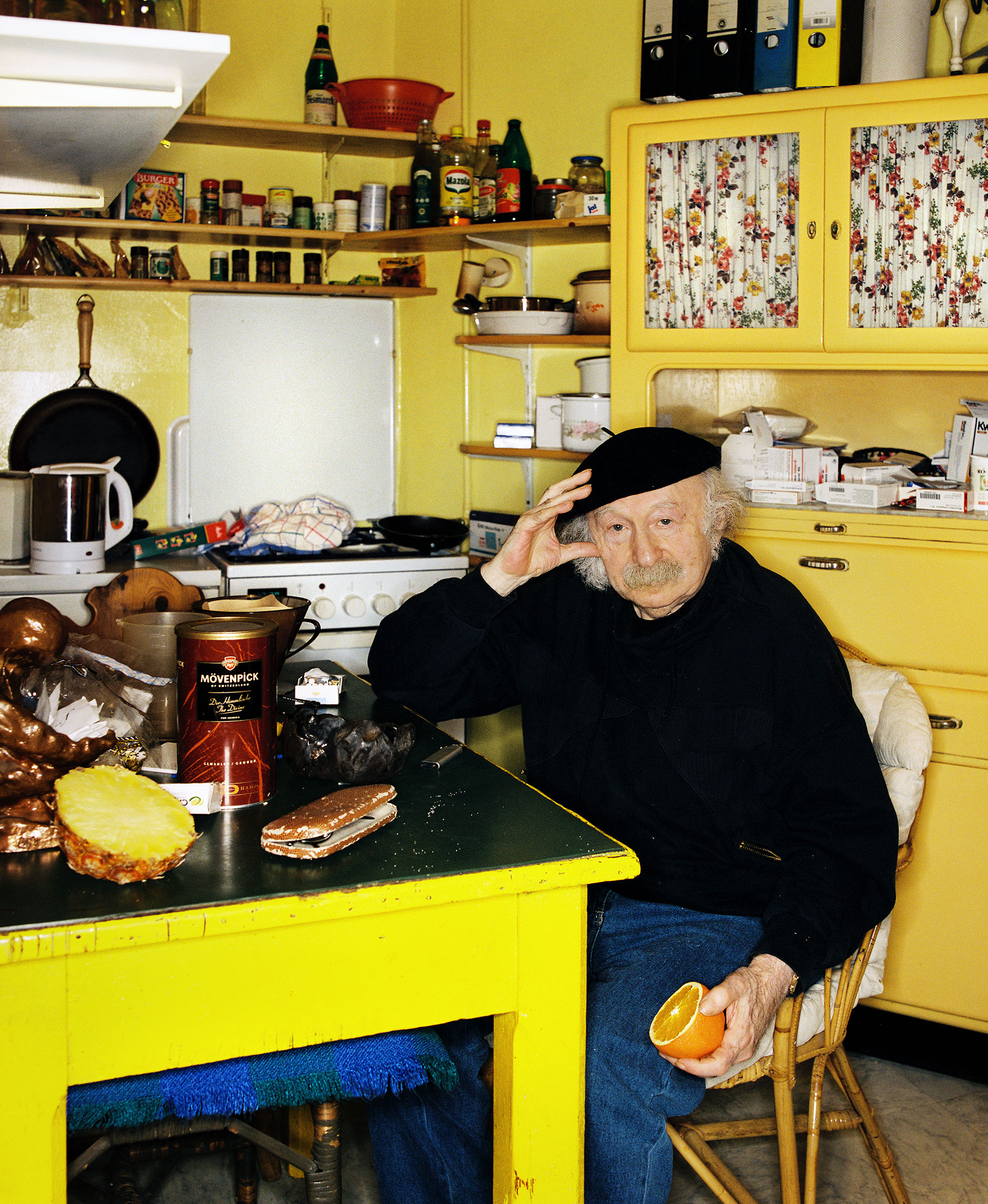
- Edgar Hilsenrath photographed by Oliver Mark, Berlin 2005
- Born: April 2, 1926; Leipzig, Saxony, Germany
- Died: December 30, 2018 (aged 92); Wittlich
- Occupation: Novelist

Edgar Hilsenrath (April 2, 1926 – December 30, 2018) was a German-Jewish writer and Holocaust survivor. He wrote several novels that gave an unvarnished view of the Holocaust which were partly based on his own experiences in a Nazi concentration camp. His main works are Night, The Nazi and the Barber, and The Story of the Last Thought. After fleeing Nazi Germany in 1944, he lived in Palestine and France, before settling in New York City in 1951 where he lived for 24 years and published his first novels. Although he was a naturalized United States citizen, he chose to return to Germany in 1975 where he lived until his death in 2018.

== Biography ==
Born in Leipzig and raised in Halle, Hilsenrath was the son of David Hilsenrath, a furrier, and Anna (Honigsberg) Hilsenrath. In 1938 his father fled to France and his mother escaped with her two children to Siret (Sereth), in Romanian Bukovina where her parents lived. The sole Jewish student at his school, he was harassed and transferred to a parochial school. In 1941, at the time that he should have received an entrance card to higher education, he and his mother were interned in the ghetto of Mohyliv-Podilskyi (called "Transnistria") after German allied Romanian troupes took control of the region. After the Red Army liberated the ghetto in 1944, he used forged documents to board a refugee train to Mandatory Palestine in order to avoid being drafted into the Russian Army. There he obtained employment at a kibbutz where he worked for nearly three years. While there he contracted malaria.

In 1947 Hilsenrath was reunited with his family in France. There he began to write about his experience of the Holocaust while living in Paris. In 1951 he moved to New York City where he supported himself by working as a waiter and a porter while writing fiction. He became a United States citizen and resided in New York City for 24 years. In 1975 he returned to Germany, where he remained until his death in 2018 in Wittlich, Germany.

According to Dagmar C. G. Lorenz, Simon Wiesenthal Center,

Hilsenrath calls things by their proper names and portrays life first and foremost as physical existence, of whose details the reader is constantly made aware: birth, nursing, feeding, sex, and excretion accompanied by feelings of pleasure and pain. The rhetoric of politicians and political theory are shown to be the schemes of beings ultimately dependent on these bodily processes and subject to physical desires. Hilsenrath's very approach is a protest against disrespect toward the mortal body, against the tyranny of the mind over matter.

== Works ==
Night described life and survival in a Jewish ghetto in Romania. In the novel The Nazi and the Barber, published in 1971 in the U.S., a German SS mass murderer, who later assumes a Jewish identity and escapes to Israel, describes the atrocities he committed.

== Awards ==
Hilsenrath received many prizes for his works. For his novel The Story of the Last Thought on the Armenian genocide, Hilsenrath received the State Award in Literature of Armenia from its president.

== Bibliography ==
- Edgar Hilsenrath, The Nazi and The Barber, Barber Press 2013. (Hardcover ISBN 978-3-9816092-0-2, Paperback ISBN 978-3-9816092-1-9, doi:10.4444/10.2).
- Edgar Hilsenrath, The Story of the Last Thought, London: Scribners 1990. (ISBN 0-356-19515-5)
- Edgar Hilsenrath, Fuck America, Berlin: Owl of Minerva Press 2018 [1980]. (ISBN 978-3-9433341-1-1)
- Edgar Hilsenrath, Night; a novel, New York: Garden City, N.Y., Doubleday 1966[1964].

Edgar Hilsenrath has published a number of books in German that have not been translated and published in English:

- Gib Acht, Genosse Mandelbaum [Beware, Comrade Mandelbaum], 1979
- Jossel Wassermanns Heimkehr [Jossel Wassermann's Return], 1993
- Moskauer Orgasmus [Moscow Orgasm], 1997
- Die Abenteuer des Ruben Jablonski: ein autobiographischer Roman [The Adventures of Ruben Jablonski], 1997
- Zibulsky, oder, Antenne im Bauch [Zibulski, or, Antenna in the Belly], 1983
- Das Unerzählbare erzählen [Telling the Untellable], 1996
