= Helga Margrét Ögmundsdóttir =

Icelandic academic

Helga Margrét Ögmundsdóttir (born 1948) is an Icelandic academic. She is a former professor at the University of Iceland.

== Personal life ==
Helga Margrét Ögmundsdóttir was born in Reykjavík in 1948. Her father was Icelandic, and her mother was German. Helga's husband is Peter Holbrook, dentist and former professor, and they have two sons.

== Professional experience ==
Helga graduated with a medical degree from the University of Iceland in 1975 and a PhD in immunology from the University of Edinburgh in 1979. After returning home in 1981 from studies and work in Edinburgh, she worked for the first few years in the Department of Virology at Landspitali University Hospital. Then, in 1987, the Icelandic Cancer Society appointed her to establish the Molecular and Cell Biology Research Laboratory, which she then directed along with Jórunn Erla Eyfjörð, molecular geneticist. The laboratory moved to the Faculty of Medicine of the University of Iceland in 2008. It is now called the Cancer Research Laboratory.

From 2001, Helga was a professor at the Faculty of Medicine at the University of Iceland. She taught Icelandic medical students cell biology from 1986 until she stopped working in 2018. The last 20 years of her professional life, Helga focused on building up research training for master's and doctoral degrees at UI's Faculty of Medicine. During these years, the doctoral programme developed from being 1-3 dissertation defences per year to being well above 10 per year in 2018.

== Research ==
Helga engaged in research and teaching, but she was also involved in diverse administrative work in cancer research and research-related graduate studies. Helga has been engaged in a variety of different research projects, starting from early research on innate immunity. With the move to the Icelandic Cancer Society breast cancer became the main subject, including studies on various aspects of cell biology and cytogenetics. She participated in international Biobank-based research on cancer causes. Furthermore, projects linking immunology and malignancy by studying the genetic and biological basis of malignancies affecting antibody-producing cells. Finally, in collaboration with the Faculty of Pharmaceutical Sciences (Kristín Ingólfsdóttir) and the Department of Chemistry, investigations on the effects of natural compounds (particularly lichen-derived and from marine invertebrates) and novel organometallic compounds on cancer cells.

== Awards ==
In 1999, Helga received Iceland's Order of the Falcon for her scientific work and, in 2005, along with Jórunn Erla Eyfjörð, she was awarded the annual prize from the Ása Guðmundsdóttir Wright Memorial Fund. In addition, in 2018 on its centenary, the Icelandic Medical Association honoured Helga for her work in building up research-related studies in the Faculty of Medicine. The same year, a symposium was held in her honour on "Cancer Research and Quality in Graduate Studies".

== Other work ==
Helga was on the Executive Committee of the European Association for Cancer Research (EACR) for 10 years. She was its secretary from 1998 to 2004 and is an honorary member of the association. She chaired the Science Committee of the University of Iceland from 2006 to 2011 and was the rector's representative on Selection Committees for appointments to Academic positions from 2008 to 2014.
