= Bergvall =

Bergvall is a Swedish surname. Notable people with the surname include:

- Agne Bergvall (born 1962), Swedish athletics coach
- Bjørn Bergvall (born 1939), Norwegian sailor
- Erik Bergvall (1880–1950), Swedish water polo player, journalist and sports official
- Helga Bergvall (1907–1978), Swedish author
- Joel Bergvall, Swedish filmmaker
- John Bergvall (1892–1959), Swedish politician
- Lucas Bergvall (born 2006), Swedish footballer, brother of Theo
- Sven Bergvall (1881–1960), Swedish actor
- Theo Bergvall (born 2004), Swedish footballer, brother of Lucas
- Thure Bergvall (1887–1950), Swedish long-distance runner

== See also ==
- Meanings of minor planet names: 8001–9000#695
