= Erla Þorsteinsdóttir =

Erla Þorsteinsdóttir may refer to:

- Erla Þorsteinsdóttir (basketball) (born 1978), Icelandic basketball player
- Erla Þorsteinsdóttir (singer) (born 1933), Icelandic singer
