= Manuela Wiesler =

Austrian-Icelandic flautist (1955–2006)

Manuela Wiesler (July 22, 1955 – December 22, 2006) was an Austrian-Icelandic flautist, known for her exceptional performances, particularly of Baroque and contemporary music.

== Career ==
Manuela Wiesler was born in Itapiranga, Brazil, the daughter of an Austrian cameraman and a ballerina. In 1957 she moved with her family to Vienna, where she entered the Academy of Music in 1967, later studying in Paris. In 1973, she moved with her husband, the clarinetist Sigurður Ingvi Snorrason, to Reykjavík, Iceland, where she lived for a decade. In 1976, she won first prize in the Nordic Chamber Music Competition in Helsinki, and in 1980 she was selected to perform on Iceland's behalf in the Copenhagen Biennale for young soloists.

Wiesler's presence in Iceland encouraged local composers to write music for her, which she performed with passion and enthusiasm. Among the works especially written for her are Xanties (1976) and 21 Music Minutes (1980) by Atli Heimir Sveinsson, Sonata per Manuela and Sumarmál (1978) for flute and harpsichord by Leifur Þórarinsson, Euridice, a flute concerto by Þorkell Sigurbjörnsson (1979), and Solitude by Magnús Blöndal Jóhannsson (1981). She was also instrumental in founding the Summer Concert Series in Skálholt Cathedral, where she performed frequently as soloist and chamber musician with her co-founder, harpsichordist Helga Ingólfsdóttir.

Wiesler lived in Sweden from 1983–1985, where she remarried, but moved back to Vienna in 1985. She made many recordings for international labels, especially on the Swedish record label BIS Records. She was also an influential teacher, and her students include Kolbeinn Bjarnason and Mario Caroli. She died of cancer in 2006.

== Recordings ==
- Solo Flute Music (4 LPs, 1982). Reissued, Polarfonia Classics, 2015.
- Sumartónleikar í Skálholtskirkju. Music by J.S. Bach, Páll P. Pálsson and Leifur Þórarinsson (with Helga Ingólfsdóttir, harpsichord). Fálkinn, 1979.
- Jolivet: Suite en concert (with Kroumata percussion ensemble). BIS Records, 1984.
- Icelandic Solo Flute Music (works by Leifur Þórarinsson, Atli Heimir Sveinsson, Magnús Blöndal Jóhannsson, Hjálmar H. Ragnarsson and Þorkell Sigurbjörnsson). BIS Records, 1989.
- The Russian Flute (with Roland Pöntinen, piano). BIS Records, 1990.
- Manuela plays French Solo Flute Music (works by Marin Marais, Henri Tomasi, Jean Francaix, André Jolivet, and Claude Debussy). BIS Records, 1990.
- French Flute Concertos (with Helsingborg Symphony Orchestra). BIS Records, 1992.
- Jolivet: The Complete Flute Music, vol. 1 (with Roland Pöntinen, piano). BIS Records, 1994.
- Jolivet: Flute Concerto (with Tapiola Sinfonietta). BIS Records, 1993.
- Oiseaux tendres. BIS Records, 1994.
- Jolivet: The Complete Flute Music, vol. 2. BIS Records, 1995.
- Liongate: Flute Concertos by Þorkell Sigurbjörnsson (with Southern Jutland Symphony Orchestra). BIS Records, 1995.
- Small is Beautiful: Short Pieces for Solo Flute. BIS Records, 1997.
- Vagn Holmboe: Flute Concertos nos. 1 and 2 (with Aalborg Symphony Orchestra). BIS Records, 1998.
- Bridges to Japan (with Noriko Origawa, piano). BIS Records, 2000.
