= The Nazi and the Barber =

Novel by Edgar Hilsenrath

- English edition (Barber Press 2013)
- Author: Edgar Hilsenrath
- Original title: Der Nazi & der Friseur
- Language: English
- Genre: Novel
- Publisher: Doubleday
- Publication date: 1971
- Publication place: United States
- Media type: Print (hardcover)

The Nazi and the Barber (also published as The Nazi Who Lived As a Jew, in the German original Der Nazi & der Friseur) is a 1971 novel by the German-Jewish writer Edgar Hilsenrath. It is a grotesque novel about the Holocaust during the time of Nazism in Germany. The work uses the perpetrator's perspective telling the biography of the SS mass murderer Max Schulz, who after World War II assumes a Jewish identity and finally emigrates to Israel in order to escape prosecution in Germany.

Hilsenrath wrote the novel in German, but because of choosing the perpetrator's perspective he initially had difficulties publishing it in Germany. The book was first published in the U.S. in an English translation by Andrew White in 1971 by Doubleday, one of the largest book publishing companies in the world, and in Germany only in 1977.

== Miscellaneous ==
In 2018, it became public that Christoph Waltz had agreed to play the leading role in a film adaptation of the novel The Nazi and The Barber, and had described the main role, the role of the mass murderer Max Schulz, as "juicy role".

== Bibliography ==
- Edgar Hilsenrath, The Nazi and The Barber, Barber Press 2013. (Hardcover ISBN 978-3-9816092-0-2, Paperback ISBN 978-3-9816092-1-9, doi:10.4444/10.2).
