= Helga (call) =

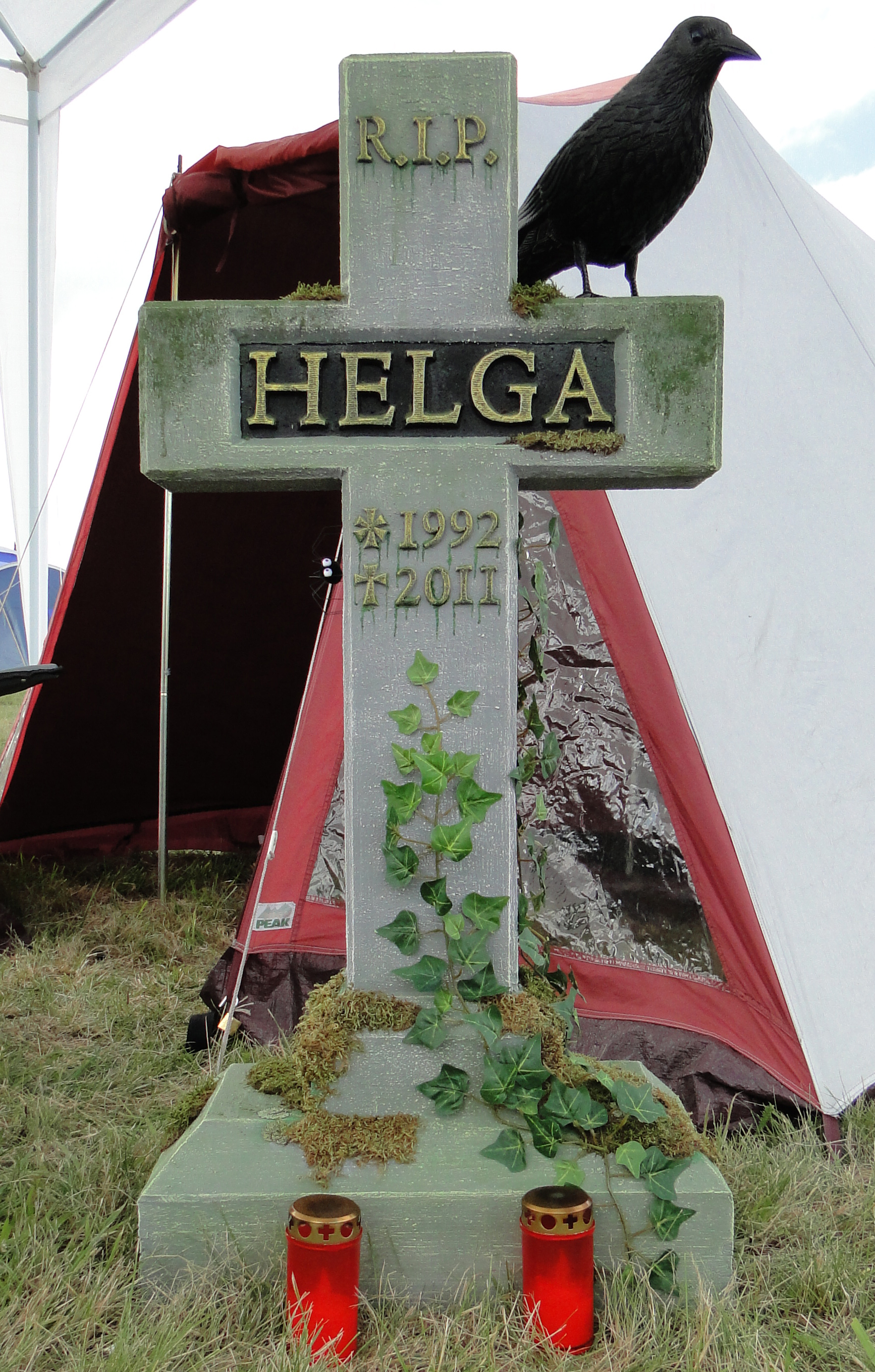
Helga festival gravestone

Calling "Helga!" is a running gag at German concerts and festivals.

== Ritual ==
A person may call for a Helga; others answer and create a chorus-like group effect. "Helga ist tot!" (Helga is dead) denies the request. Further allegations are gravestones, memorials or graffiti. The background is unknown; some point to a rather rainy Hurricane Festival in Scheeßel, where a high pressure cyclone called Helga was called for but did not arrive in time. The call is also the origin of the name for an annual prize for German festivals, and is being used by a service company.
