= Enn Nõu =

Estonian writer (born 1933)

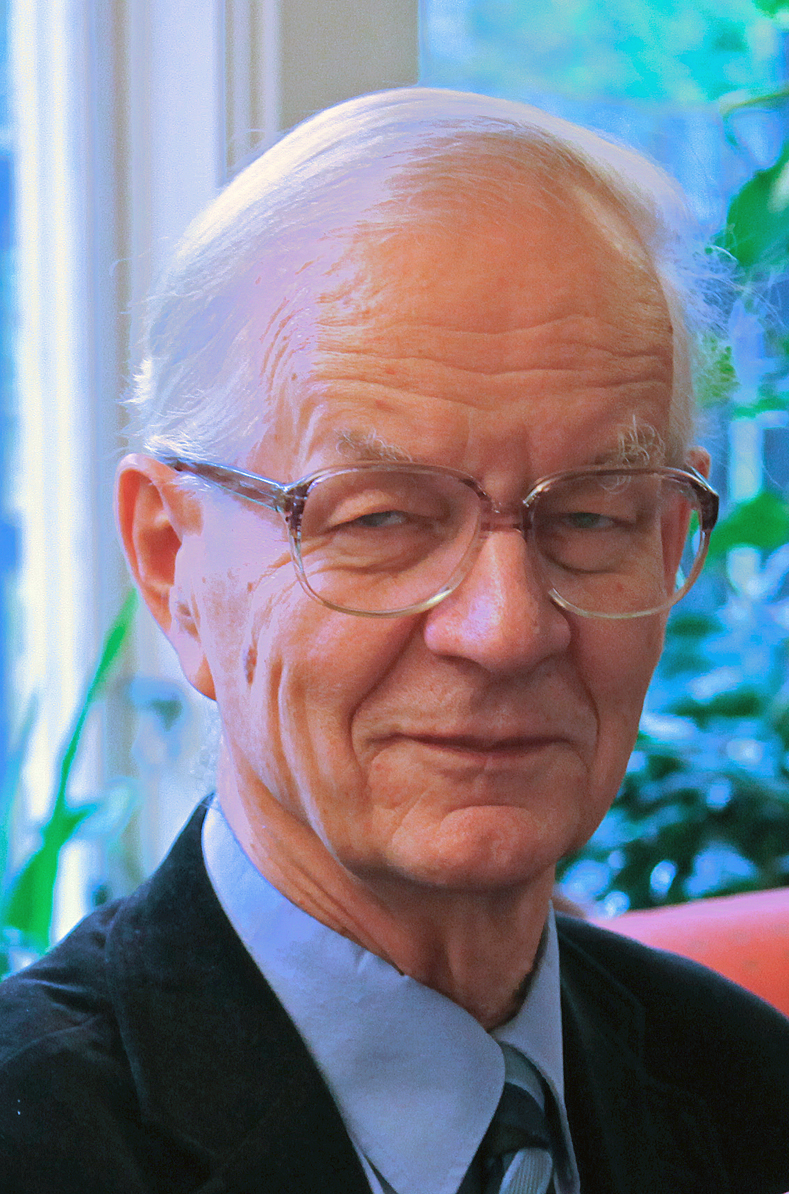
Enn Nõu in 2011

Enn Nõu (born 2 October 1933 in Tallinn) is an Estonian writer.

== Life and work ==
Nõu was born the son of the Estonian agricultural scientist Joosep Nõu (1906–1999). In 1944 the family fled the approaching Red Army to Sweden. From 1953 to 1961 Nõu studied medicine at the University of Uppsala. He then worked as a lung specialist. From 1979 Nõu was a lecturer at the Medical Faculty of Uppsala University. In 1957 he married the Estonian exile writer Helga Nõu (née Raukas, born 1934).

Nõu was one of the leading organizers of Estonian exile community in Sweden and was politically active against the Soviet occupation of Estonia. He became famous as a writer, known for his naturalistic and richly detailed prose. Between 1999 and 2000, Nõu was the last Chairman of the Estonian Association of Writers Abroad (Välismaine Eesti Kirjanike Liit).

== Works (selection) ==
- Pidulik Marss (novel, 1968, 1992)
- Vastuvett (collection of short stories, 1972, 1995)
- Lõigatud tiibadega (novel, 1976, 1994)
- Pärandusmaks (novel, 1976, 1994)
- Nelikümmend viis (novel, 1984, 1996)
- Koeratapja (novel, 1988, 1993, 2009)
- Presidendi kojutulek (novel, 1996)
- Mõtusekuke viimane kogupauk (novel, 2005)
- Vabariigi pojad ja tütred I osa (novel, 2010)
- Vabariigi pojad ja tütred II osa (novel, 2011)
- Vabariigi pojad ja tütred III osa (novel, 2012)
- Ma armastasin rootslast ehk Sollefteå suvi (novel, 2013)
- Saaremaa eleegia (novel, 2015)
- Poisteraamat (novel, 2016)
- Elu ja aeg (memories, 2019)
- Ufa umbsõlm (documentary novel 2020)
- Ülestähendusi ajast ja elust (memories, 2023)
- Need meie väga vanad armastuskirjad (correspondence, Helga and Enn Nõu 1956-1958)
- Tont teab (anthology of short stories, editor and co-author, 1968)
- Tõotan ustavaks jääda...Eesti Vabariigi valitsus 1940-1992 (Collection of historical writings and documents; editors: Mart Orav and Enn Nõu, Enn Nõu is also co-author)(2004)
- Kuusteist Eesti kirja (anthology of short stories, co-author, 2018)
