= Helga Pogatschar =

German composer (born 1966)

Helga Pogatschar (born 1966) is a German composer.

She was born in Munich and studied piano and film composition at the Hochschule für Musik und Theater there. She spent one year at the college of music in Gothenburg, Sweden, to study electro-acoustic composition. Afterwards she was a lecturer at the colleges of music in Munich and Hamburg. She was awarded the project scholarship for contemporary music and media, as well as the music award of the City of Munich.

She conceived and realized numerous own music theatre projects combining contemporary music with electronics, dance, video and performance elements. In parallel her works „Mars - ein Requiem“, „Titus Trash Tatar“ and „Inanna“ were published on CD by Chrom Records. She also composed the music for various radio plays which were recorded on CD together with the radio channels ‘Bayern2 radio play & media art’ and ‘Bayern4 classics’ of the Bayerischer Rundfunk (BR).

Helga Pogatschar is a member of the theatre jury of the City of Munich. Apart from various commissions she is strongly engaged in the musical adaptation of stories and books for children.
