= Helga Weisz =

Austrian industrial ecologist

Helga Weisz (born 1961 in Villach) is an Austrian industrial ecologist, climate scientist, and professor of industrial ecology and climate change at the Institute for Social Sciences at the Humboldt University of Berlin. She heads the FutureLab "Social Metabolism & Impacts" at the Potsdam Institute for Climate Impact Research (PIK).

== Life ==
Weisz graduated from the University of Vienna with a master's degree in microbiology in 1995. She received her doctorate in cultural studies from the HU Berlin in 2002. In 2006, she graduated from Alpen-Adria University with a Venia Docendi (Habilitation) in socioecology. From 1991 to 2009 she held various scientific roles at the Faculty for Interdisciplinary Research and Continuing Education in Vienna. She has been a guest professor at the University of St. Gallen and Yale School of Forestry & Environmental Studies. From 2009 to 2012 she was a co-chair of PIK research domain II: Climate impacts & vulnerability, and from 2012 to 2018 of the research domain for interdisciplinary concepts and methods.

== Work ==
Weisz's research focuses on the socially responsible production of raw materials and energy, the conversion of raw materials into goods and services, and their use and disposal in the environment as waste, emissions and heat, which together constitute social metabolism.

Weisz is active in the public debate about means to address the climate crisis. When she published her study on reducing urban greenhouse gas footprints in 2017, she said: "Cities around the world must be encouraged and enabled to monitor their entire emission spectrum—local and upstream emissions. Only then can the necessary and ambitious plans of many cities to comply with the 2-degree limit be realized." (Note: "Weltweit müssen Städte ermutigt und befähigt werden, ihr gesamtes Emissionsspektrum – lokale und vorgelagerte Emissionen – zu beobachten. Erst dadurch können die notwendigen und ambitionierten Pläne vieler Städte zur Einhaltung der 2-Grad-Grenze verwirklicht werden.")

== Selected publications ==
- With Peter-Paul Pichler, Timm Zwickel, Abel Chavez, Tino Kretschmer, Jessica Seddon: Reducing urban greenhouse gas footprints. In: Scientific Reports, 7, 2017, p. 14659.
- With Fridolin Krausmann, Christof Amann, Nina Eisenmenger, Karl-Heinz Erb, Klaus Hubacek, Marina Fischer-Kowalski: The physical economy of the European Union: Cross-country comparison and determinants of material consumption. In: Ecological Economics, 58 (4), pp. 676–698.
- With Sangwon Suh, T. E. Graedel: Industrial Ecology: The role of manufactured capital in sustainability. In: Proceedings of the National Academy of Sciences, 112(20), 2015, pp. 6260–6264.
