= Helga Slessarev =

German literary scholar

Helga Slessarev, née Rettig is a scholar of German literature, a specialist in the poetry of Eduard Mörike.

Slessarev gained her PhD from the University of Cincinnati in 1955, with a thesis on 'Time as an element of poetic intuition in Eduard Mörike'. She became Head of the Department of Germanic Languages and Literature at the University of Cincinnati in 1973, and retired from the university in 1989.

A festschrift in her honor, The Enlightenment and its legacy, was published in 1991.

== Works ==
- Eduard Mörike, 1970
