= Helga Amesberger =

Austrian ethnologist and sociologist

Helga Amesberger (1960 in Waizenkirchen, Upper Austria) is an Austrian ethnologist, sociologist and political scientist. She has been working at the Vienna Institute for Conflict Research since the early 1990s. (IKF).

== Education and professional activity ==
Helga Amesberger studied ethnology and sociology at the University of Vienna and graduated with a master's degree. She also studied for a doctorate at the Institute for Political Science at the University of Vienna and doctorate in 2005 with a thesis on the Dominant Culture Approach in comparison to the Critical Whiteness Studies (CWS) in the US and in German-speaking countries. Since 1993, she has been a research associate at the Institute for Conflict Research in Vienna, where she often collaborates with the social scientist Brigitte Halbmayr and sometimes publishes together with her. In addition, Amesberger worked at the University of Vienna as Lektorin at the Institute for Political Science and at the Institute for Cultural and Social Anthropology. She has also held teaching positions at the Alpen-Adria-Universität Klagenfurt (2014), at the Institute for Legal Studies at the Karl-Franzens-University Graz (since winter semester 2019/20) and at the Center for Teacher Education at the University of Vienna (winter semester 2019/20). She is a founding member of the ARGE Wiener Ethnologinnen.

Her research focuses on prostitution policy, violence against women, racism, National Socialism and Holocaust as well as feminist research.In the field of historical social research, Helga Amesberger is particularly dedicated to the survivors of the concentration camps Mauthausen and Ravensbrück. As project manager, together with Brigitte Halbmayr, she supervised the "Mauthausen Eyewitness Project", in which around 800 interviews were conducted with survivors of the Mauthausen concentration camp in a total of 23 countries under the scientific direction of the historian Gerhard Botz from the Ludwig Boltzmann Institute for Historical Social Science in Vienna. A study on the surviving women of the Mauthausen concentration camp, which builds on this interview project, was completed in 2010. The volume 'Mauthausen revisited', co-edited by Amesberger, shows how school pupils capture their impressions of the memorial site in photographs.

Amesberger's work on Austrian women in the Ravensbrück women's concentration camp, which she has written with colleagues since the mid-1990s, is extensive. The two-volume publication "Vom Leben und Überleben – Wege nach Ravensbrück. The Women's Concentration Camp in Memory" (2001) provides documentation and analysis of biographical interviews on the one hand, and on the other provides an insight into the biographies of around 40 Austrian survivors. With the volume "Sexualized Violence. Female Experiences in Nazi Concentration Camps" (2004), Helga Amesberger and her colleagues Katrin Auer and Brigitte Halbmayr created a standard work on a topic that has received little attention. The research project she carried out together with Brigitte Halbmayr and Kerstin Lercher on the "Registration of the names of formerly imprisoned Austrians in Ravensbrück concentration camp" was completed in 2009. In 2013, the interactive website ravensbrueckerinnen.at went online, providing a wealth of information about Ravensbrück concentration camp and the Austrians in Ravensbrück concentration camp, as well as materials such as videos, photos and teaching and learning aids. In her most recent research, she deals with the persecution of women stigmatized as "asocials" under National Socialism.

In addition to various academic studies (see Publications), Amesberger has published numerous articles in specialist journals and collective works on the subject of the National Socialist persecution of women.
