= Helga Nõu =

Estonian writer

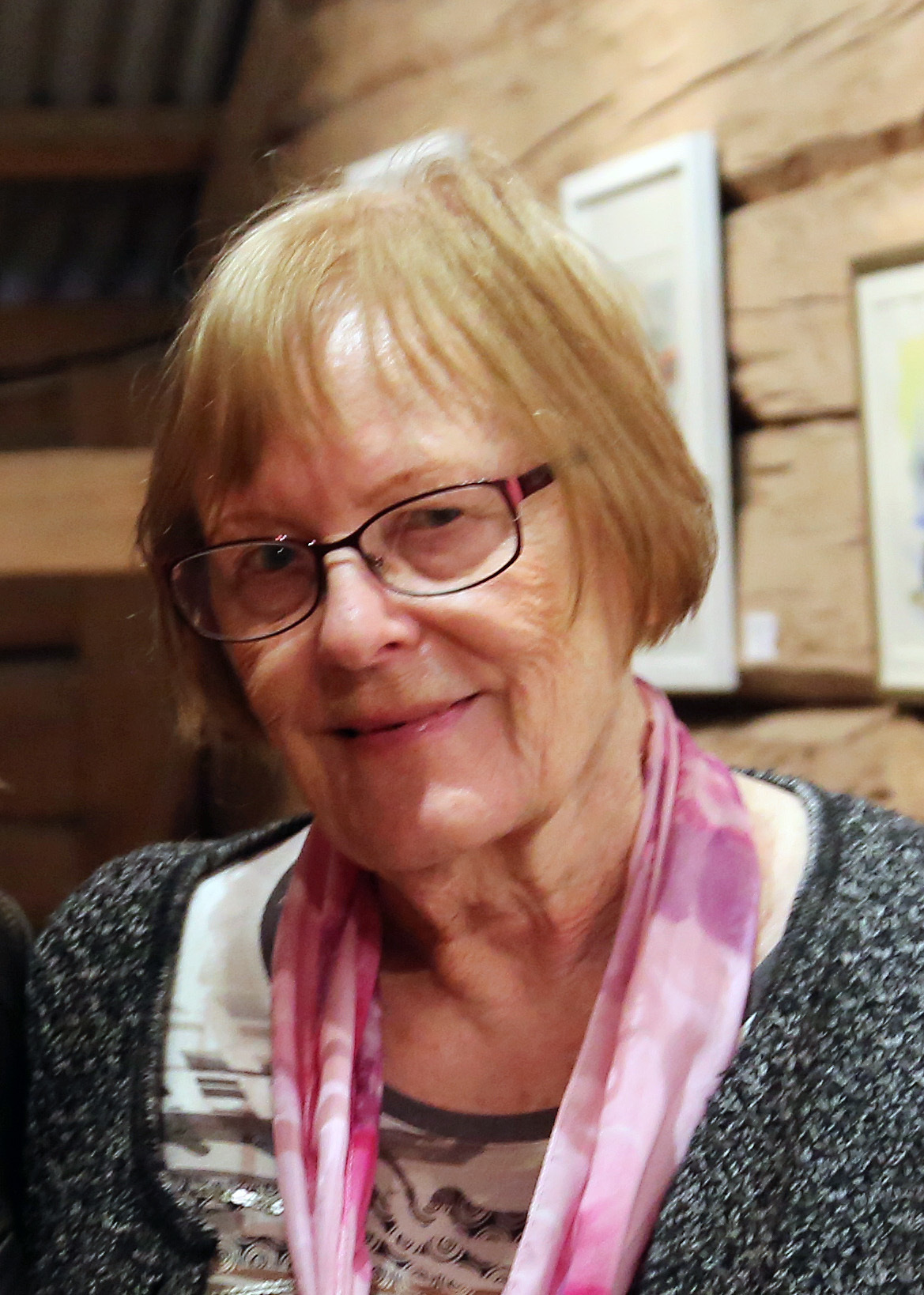
Helga Nõu in 2017.

Helga Nõu (née Raukas; born 22 September 1934 in Tartu) is an Estonian writer, best known for her novels Kass sööb rohtu (1965), Tiiger, tiiger (1969), and Pea suu! (1983). She was invested with the Order of the White Star in 2001. Her husband is writer and medical researcher Enn Nõu.
