= Helga Stentzel =

Russian-born visual artist

Helga Stentzel is a Russian-born visual artist, known for her ‘household surrealism’ series which uses clothing, kitchen utensils, books, bread, and more to create characters and scenes. She works across a wide range of media including illustration, photography, video and stop motion animation.

== Early life and education ==
Stentzel was born in Siberia, Russia. She studied at the Omsk State Institute of Technology and was awarded a BA in Graphic Design and Advertising from Central Saint Martins. She began her career as an art director in the advertising industry.

== Work ==
Stentzel is known for her use of household objects in her art, particularly food and laundry. She credits "simplicity", "day-to-day activities" and "observation without expectations" as key inspirations for her work.

In 2021 her works Pegasus and Smoothie, a horse and a cow styled from laundry on a washing line, attracted media coverage from outlets including El Colombiano, The Chosun Ilbo and Colossal.

== Awards ==
In 2020, Stentzel won Snackable Content Awards ‘Food Art Creator of the Year’.

== See also ==
- Surrealist photography
