= Helga Moreira =

Portuguese poet

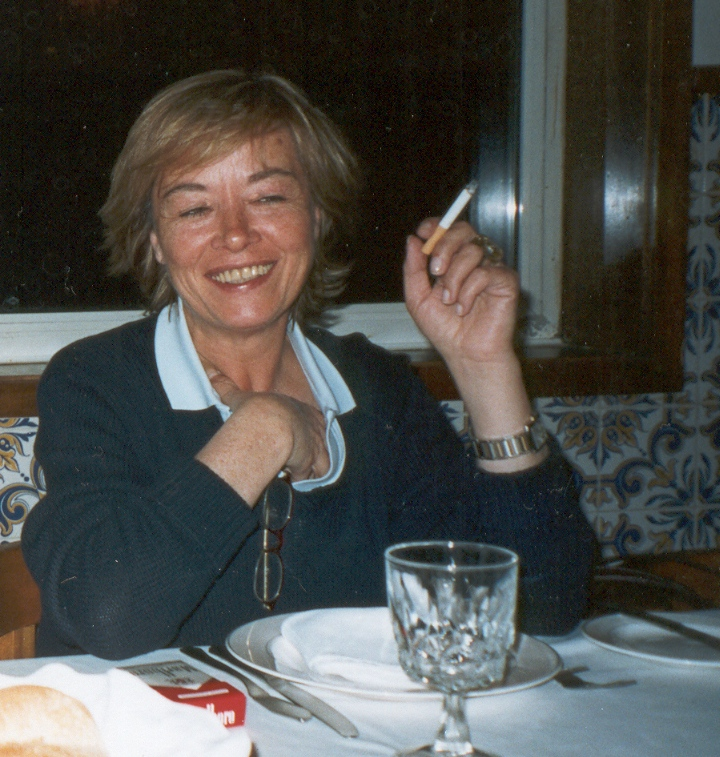
Helga Moreira

Helga Moreira is a Portuguese poet.

Moreira was born in Guarda on April 29, 1950. She has lived in Porto since 1968.

She published her first book in 1978, and many of her poems have appeared in various magazines.

== Works ==
=== Poetry ===
- 1978 Cantos do Silêncio
- 1980 Fogo Suspenso
- 1983 Quem não vier do sul
- 1985 Aromas
- 1996 Os Dias Todos Assim
- 2001 Um Fio de Noite
- 2002 Desrazões
- 2003 Tumulto
- 2006 Agora que falamos de morrer
