= Helga Fägerskiöld =

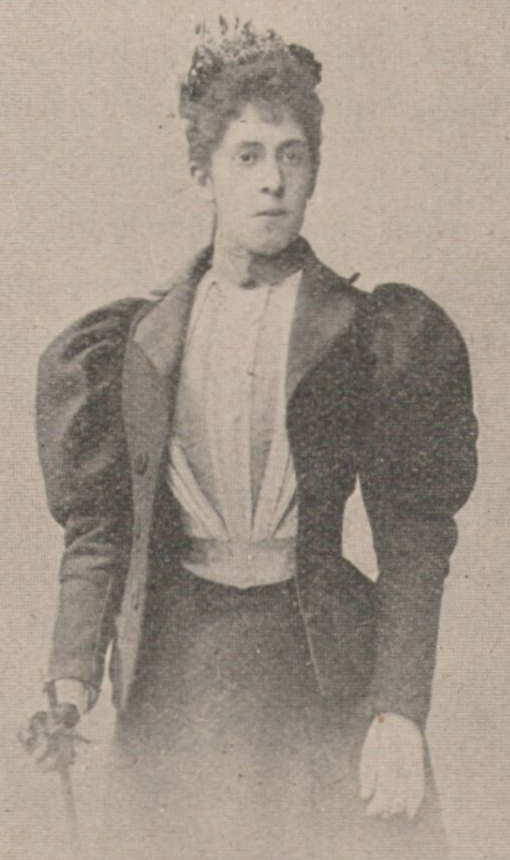
Fägerskiöld

Helga Davida Fägerskiöld (30 September 1871 – 25 September 1958) was a Swedish baroness, and an accused in a famous Swedish murder trial and cause célèbre: the so called Broxvik Drama, in 1896–1898.

She was born in Härna. Her parents were Baron Knut Henrik Fägerskiöld, an engineer, and Georgina Sofia Gunilla Adelsköld. She was present at the death bed of her intended father-in-law, the noble and courtier Evert Taube von Block, at Broxik Manor in 1895. She later convinced her fiancé, the noble Evert Taube, that his mother Betzy von Röök had murdered his father by poison. In the body of Evert Taube von Block, traces of poison were found. The case was brought to trial in 1896, upon which von Röök sued her for slander. The trial was a sensation, and the lawyers of the parties made appeals to the public's sentiments by populism, after which followers took sides based upon political sympathies. Fägerskiöld was represented by Karl Staaff.

In 1897, she confessed that she herself had poisoned Taube von Block for her fiancé to inherit Broxvik Manor: she had accused von Röök to prevent her from inheriting the property and will it to her younger son. As her statement was supported by circumstances, she was accused of murder and von Röök was acquitted. She subsequently retracted her confession, stating that she had only made it to create a sensation to avoid any attention from her recent illegitimate child birth. The court found itself unable to sentence her guilty upon her earlier confession as it did not regard the evidence sufficient to convict her guilty against her denial. On 1 April 1898, the case was closed and Fägerskiöld was freed for lack of proof.

She left Sweden after the trial and spent the rest of her life in the United States. Around 1908, she married the American lawyer William W. White. She died in New York City on 25 September 1958.

Yngve Lyttkens wrote Dramat på Broxvik (The Broxvik drama) in 1948 based on the case.
