= Helga Pedersen =

Helga Pedersen may refer to:

- Helga Pedersen (Denmark) (1911–1980), Danish politician
- Helga Pedersen (Norway) (born 1973), Norwegian politician
