= Helga Zoega =

Icelandic academic

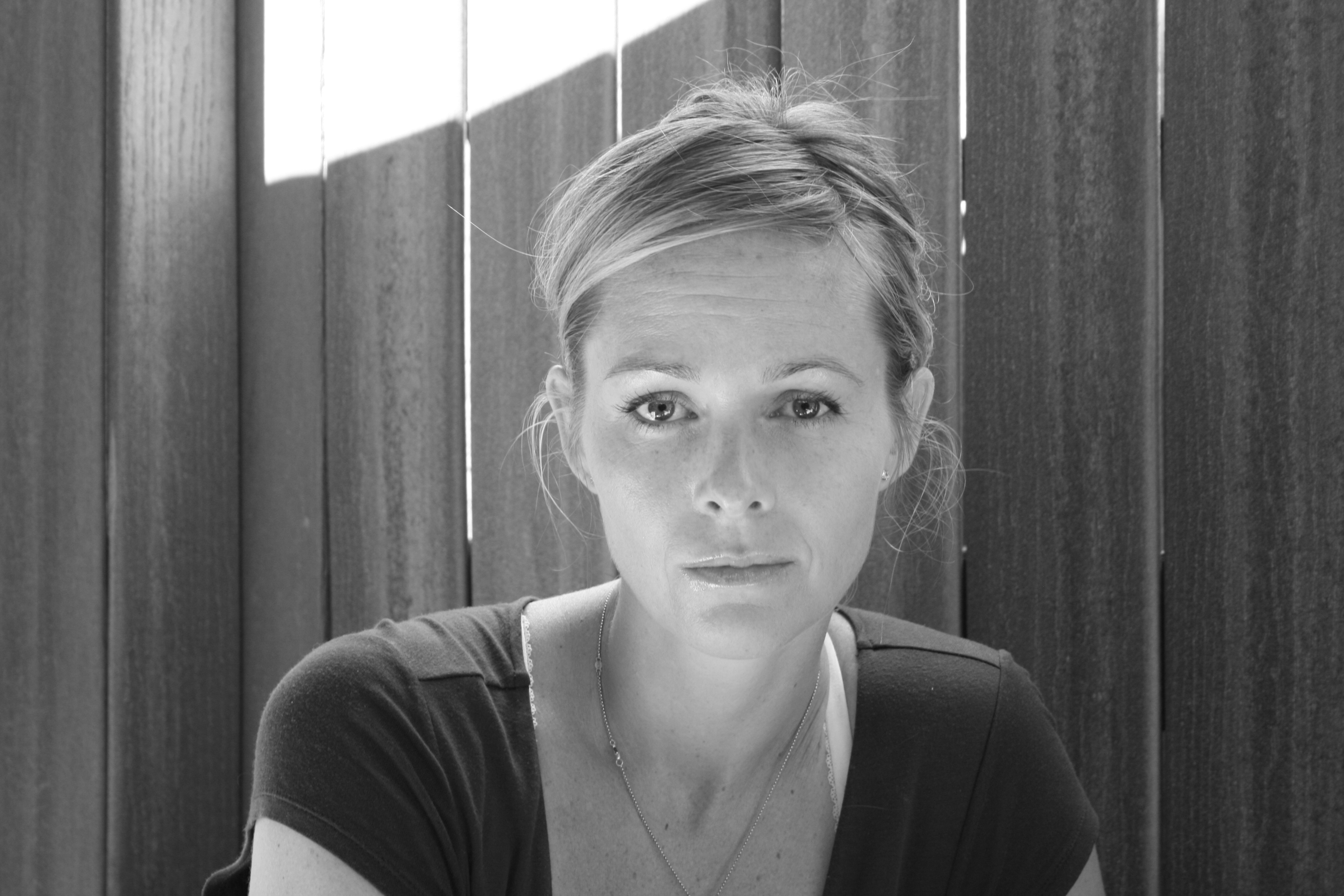
- Born: 1976 (age 49–50)
- Occupation: professor of Public Health at the Faculty of Medicine University of Iceland

Helga Zoega (born 1976) is a Professor of Public Health at the Faculty of Medicine, University of Iceland. Her research focuses on population mental health and medication use among vulnerable populations, e.g. pregnant women and children.

== Education ==
Zoega completed her BA in Political Science at the University of Iceland in 2002. In 2006, she completed an MA in Quantitative Methods in the Social Sciences at Columbia University.

Zoega was the first to receive a doctorate in Public Health Sciences from the University of Iceland. She defended her PhD thesis in 2011 on psychotropic medication use among children and the effect of ADHD treatment on academic progress. Zoega was a postdoctoral fellow in Epidemiology at the Icahn School of Medicine at Mount Sinai in New York, 2011–2013.

== Professional experience ==
Zoega joined the Faculty of Medicine, Centre of Public Health Sciences at the University of Iceland in 2012 and was promoted to Professor in 2016. Previously, she was as a project manager for the Icelandic Prescription Medicines Register at the Directorate of Health (2006-2008).

In 2017–2018, Zoega was a Visiting Professorial Fellow at UNSW Sydney, where she was awarded a Scientia Program Awards to further her research in Pharmacoepidemiology (2018-2026).

Zoega has served on several scientific and ethical committees, including the Icelandic Science and Technology Policy Council & Icelandic Science Board (2016–19), appointed by the Prime Minister of Iceland. She played a pivotal role in the founding of the Nordic Pharmaco-Epidemiological Network (NorPEN), for which she served on the Executive Committee (2013–18).

Zoega plays a leading role in large-scale international consortia in providing real-world evidence of medication safety and effectiveness during pregnancy, including InPreSS (International Pregnancy Safety Study), SCAN-AED (Nordic Register-Based Study of Antiepileptics in Pregnancy), and Co-OPT (Consortium for the Study Of Pregnancy Treatments). Zoega has led commissioned research for the Australian Department of Health resulting in national drug policy changes.

== Research ==
Zoega is a pharmacoepidemiologist with expertise in the use, safety and effectiveness of psychotropic medications. Her research program is based on the use of "real-world data", i.e. large-scale electronic health and social data linked across sources in Australia, the Nordic countries, and the US.

Zoega's research findings on pharmacotherapy during pregnancy have been published in JAMA, BMJ, JAMA Psychiatry, Annals of Internal Medicine, etc. Her work on stimulant treatment for ADHD includes multinational studies on treatment patterns, effects on academic progress and impact of relative-age, published in Pediatrics, Lancet Psychiatry, J Child Psychol Psychiatry, Acta Psychiatrica Scandinavica and widely covered in media outlets (New York Times, Time Online, Reuters, ABC, US News, Boston Globe, etc.).

== Personal ==
Helga Zoega (b. 1976) divides her time between Sydney and Reykjavik. She has daughter and a son.

== Selected work ==
- β-Blocker Use in Pregnancy and the Risk for Congenital Malformations: An International Cohort Study. Bateman BT, Heide-Jørgensen U, Einarsdóttir K, Engeland A, Furu K, Gissler M, Hernandez-Diaz S, Kieler H, Lahesmaa-Korpinen AM, Mogun H, Nørgaard M, Reutfors J, Selmer R, Huybrechts KF, ZOEGA H. Ann Intern Med. 2018 Nov 20;169(10):665-673.
- Association Between Methylphenidate and Amphetamine Use in Pregnancy and Risk of Congenital Malformations: A Cohort Study From the International Pregnancy Safety Study Consortium. Huybrechts KF, Bröms G, Christensen LB, Einarsdóttir K, Engeland A, Furu K, Gissler M, Hernandez-Diaz S, Karlsson P, Karlstad Ø, Kieler H, Lahesmaa-Korpinen AM, Mogun H, Nørgaard M, Reutfors J, Sørensen HT, ZOEGA H, Bateman BT. JAMA Psychiatry. 2018 Feb 1;75(2):167-175.
- Use of SSRI and SNRI Antidepressants during Pregnancy: A Population-Based Study from Denmark, Iceland, Norway and Sweden. ZOEGA H, Kieler H, Nørgaard M, Furu K, Valdimarsdottir U, Brandt L, Haglund B. PLoS One. 2015 Dec 14;10(12):e0144474.
- Age, academic performance, and stimulant prescribing for ADHD: a nationwide cohort study. ZOËGA H, Valdimarsdóttir UA, Hernández-Díaz S. Pediatrics. 2012 Dec;130(6):1012-8.
- A population-based study of stimulant drug treatment of ADHD and academic progress in children. ZOËGA H, Rothman KJ, Huybrechts KF, Ólafsson Ö, Baldursson G, Almarsdóttir AB, Jónsdóttir S, Halldórsson M, Hernández-Diaz S, Valdimarsdóttir UA. Pediatrics. 2012 Jul;130(1):e53-62.
