= Hege Jensen =

Norwegian politician (born 1971)

Hege Jensen (born 12 April 1971) is a Norwegian politician for the Progress Party.

She served as a deputy representative to the Parliament of Norway from Hedmark during the term 2013–2017. In total she met during 129 days of parliamentary session. She hails from Stange Municipality.
