= Helga Wagner =

German swimmer

Personal information
- Born: 27 July 1956 (age 69) Frankfurt, Germany

Sport
- Sport: Swimming

Helga Wagner (born 27 July 1956) is a German former swimmer. She competed in two events at the 1972 Summer Olympics.
