= Helga Plumb =

Canadian architect (born 1939)

Helga Plumb is a Canadian architect known for her post modern and environmentally friendly design. She was born in Bruck/Mur, Austria, in 1939. Plumb left Austria at the age of 20, and emigrated to Canada, where she settled in Toronto in 1959.

== Education ==
Helga Plumb studied architecture at the Technische Hochschule in Austria for one year before moving to Toronto, Canada. She completed her undergraduate degree in architecture at the University of Toronto in 1963 and remained there to receive her masters of architecture in Urban design in 1967. It was very uncommon for women in Ontario to be studying architecture during this time. Countries like Austria had a higher population of female students. Many women who left to study in Canada were often the only women in their class. Female architects such as Plumb have openly discussed the alienation that occurred studying as a woman in the Ontario classroom during the 1960s and 70s.

== Career ==
After Plumb graduated from her master's program, she began to work for multiple firms. She began her career at Diamond and Clark where she was a project architect in Edmonton, Alberta. Here Plumb helped design the Edmonton Health Sciences Centre as well as a housing project and Amphitheatre in Calgary. Around this time, she also began working for Sasaki Dawson & DeMay as a design assistant in Watertown, Massachusetts. While with this company Plumb aided in the construction of the Barrington College Gymnasium and the Watertown University Library. Later she worked for Shore and Moffat as their production architect based in Toronto. Her projects were the General Arts Building at the University of Saskatoon and the Coinco Research Building in Burlington Ontario. While developing her skills and working her way up to larger projects, Plumb also began being involved in the academic side of her field. From 1981 to 1982 she worked as an associate professor at the University of Waterloo. After that, she moved to the Technical University of Nova Scotia from 1985 to 1986 as a visiting professor. Through her teaching career, Plumb became very interested in how classrooms were used and what they did to benefit or distract students. How people interacted in her buildings became a constant concern for Plumb. She believed buildings should encourage social engagement instead of hinder it. As her career developed, she began to work at the Fairfield and Du Bois Partnership, where she met her soon-to-be husband, Macy Du Bois. After Fairfield left for retirement, Plumb was promoted to partner, and the company was renamed the Du Bois Plumb Partnership. Between the years of 1979-1993 Plumb and Du Bois created some of their most memorable work, one of these works being the Canadian Embassy in Beijing. This building took over ten years of planning to create; this was due to a number of bureaucratic circumstances that caused many problems for the architects and builders. The embassy located at 19 Dongzhimenwai Dajie, Caho Yang District in Beijing is one of 172 foreign representations in Beijing and one of 382 foreign representatives in China.

Plumb enjoyed working alongside her husband and did so until her retirement in 2001. Plumb once stated, “I’m not sure I would get jobs if clients didn’t know I had a male back-up.” It was not uncommon for people in Ontario to believe women needed a male-presence to make an impact in architecture. Female architects based out of Ontario commonly noted that they felt intimidated by the extremely male-dominated field. On the other hand, many female architects based out of Quebec said they did not and would often get offended by any suggestion that they needed to rely on their male co-workers to make it in the industry.

=== Architectural style ===
Plumb's style is known for uniting people inside a space. She enjoyed taking old architectural ideas and reconstructing them to fit modern life. She believed contemporary ideas were built from ideas of the past and not entirely new. She often focused on function, structure, and material in her buildings and believed these were the foundations for creating a remarkable design. However, she believed that function and structure were slightly more critical than material, and that material should be used as a way to support function and structure. She wanted her buildings to be backgrounds on which people could engage with one another. Her buildings never dominated a space but rather blended into their surroundings. While growing up, Plumb was heavily inspired by the old architecture of Austria. She noticed the way these buildings and streets made people act within them. Plumb took these ideas and applied them to a post-modern style. She liked the sophistication of the modern movement and its step away from ornamentation. Plumb once stated, “I don’t think you have to attach things to architecture because you can utilize everything you have.” This idea is often portrayed in her designs.

=== Notable works ===
The Oakland Condominium is a large housing complex built in 1981, two years after becoming partners with Macy Du Bois. This building located on 315 Avenue Road and 20-40 Oakland's Ave Summer Hill, Toronto is made up of six floors and 65 different apartments. In this work Plumb wanted to create the idea of a city within a city, to do this she created an internal walkway through the building that is full of natural light. This way renters could come to this mini-city to engage with one another. All renters have access to a parking garage and visitor parking to encourage residents to bring guests. This building's architecture won Plumb the Habitation Space International Award of Excellence, the Canadian Architect Yearbook Award of Excellence, the O.A.A Toronto Life Design Award, the Canadian Architect Design Award and the Governor General’s Medal for Architecture. Plumb used the Scaramouche Restaurant in Toronto as another way to play with human interaction. Built-in 1979 this building is located at 1 Benevento Place in Toronto, Ontario. The foundation of the restaurant is created using a structural grid that controls but encourages the flow of traffic through the restaurant. Plumb designed this building to sit on a hillside, so diners could enjoy looking down onto the city while eating. At night the city lights create a romantic backdrop for the restaurant's French cuisine. The original owner that worked with Plumb continues to run the restaurant over 35 years later. The pair worked together to create an environment that matched the chef's contemporary French food. The restaurant's space is divided so that people can enjoy a casual dinner downstairs or fine dining upstairs. Reviews of this restaurant continue to praise Plumb's design, stating it creates the perfect atmosphere for relaxing.

Another famous project from the Du Bois Plumb Partnership is the Tom Longboat Elementary School erected in 1978. This school is located at 37 Crow Trail in Scarborough Malvern and is named after the long-distance runner and Onondaga Aboriginal, Tom Longboat. The school shows Plumb's famous postmodern style that contains a grid-like foundation similar to the Scaramouche Restaurant. The grid encourages children to play and learn with one another but also to remain organized. This building ended up winning the Scarborough Planning Board Urban Design Certificate of Merit and the OMRC Award of Merit. Plumb was often disappointed with the lack of resources and effort put into creating schools for children. She thought Canadian schools resembled jail too much and did not encourage learning. Helga Plumb often turned down requests for schools with no windows at all so that students would not be distracted. Once in an interview, Plumb stated, “there is this whole idea that children will be distracted outside which is incredible to me because there is so much to learn outside. To lock a kid up inside is unbelievable.” A specific moment that altered the way Plumb saw the classroom was when a butterfly fluttered through her window while teaching one day. She stated that all the students stopped their work and became completely engaged with the butterfly. After her attempt to redirect her students’ attention failed, she gave up and spent the rest of her class talking about and watching the butterfly. Plumb realized the disconnect students have from nature in the classroom; schools do not reflect the minds of their students instead they try to control them. Plumb attempted to alter the classroom in very cost-effective ways. In some cases, she would slant roofs in order to allow more windows, or she would colour the walls. School boards kept pushing architects to harden schools so they would last a long time; however, Plumb noticed this caused them to resemble prison cells more and more. By increasing natural light and colour Plumb was attempting to bring softness and life back into the classroom.

=== Awards received from other projects ===
- Helga Plumb has received the Governor General's medal for architecture.
- Her works have been included in publishings on energy efficient design.
- Plumb received the O.M.R.C Award of Merit for the Grand River Cable Television.
- Plumb was awarded the Low Energy Building Design Award of Excellence for the Government of Canada Office Building.
- Plumb was awarded the Modern Healthcare/ AIA Design Award and the Nova Scotia Association of Architects Award for the Souris Hospital in Nova Scotia.

== Affiliations ==
- Member of the Ontario Association of Architects.
- Fellow member of the Royal Architectural Institute of Canada.
- Past executive member of the Toronto Society of Architects.
- Past member of the Toronto Urban Action Committee.
- Past member of the O.A.A Task Force on Conservation.
- Member of the Professional Advisory Council at Humber Colledge (Interior design department).
- Advisor of the Architectural Science Department at Ryerson Polytechnical Institute.
- Past Faculty Council member of the school of architecture at the University of Toronto.
- Former member of the board of directors at the Canadian Wood Council.
- Chairman for the RAIC Awards Committee.
- A member of the Royal Architectural Institute of Canada.
- Design critic at various schools of architecture across Canada and the United States of America.
