= Helga Exner =

Czech-born Danish goldsmith (born 1939)

- Born: 9 October 1939; Jablonec, Czechoslovakia
- Died: Goldsmith

Helga Exner née Menzel (born 1939) is a Czech-born Danish goldsmith who is recognized as one of Denmark's most significant contemporary jewellery designers. From the age of 16, she was trained by Herbert Seufert in Bad Godesberg, Germany, where she met her future husband, the Danish goldsmith Bent Exner. After they married in 1961, the couple established a workshop near Randers, working together until 1983. Since they separated, she has produced jewellery in her own studio holding a number of solo exhibitions in the late 1980s and 1990s.

== Biography ==
Born in Jablonec, Czechoslovakia, on 9 October 1939, Helga Exner is the daughter of the engineer Heinrich Menzel (1913–1979) and his wife Maria Theresia née Dressler. On 3 January 1961, she married the goldsmith Bent Exner (1932–2006). The marriage was dissolved in 1983.

She was brought up in a family which had created jewellery for several generations until the Second World War brought an end to their business in 1945. Her father was taken prisoner and her mother fled to East Germany with Helga and her three sisters. They managed to move to West Germany where six years later they were reunited with the father. Helga lived with her grandparents in Bavaria where she attended a Roman Catholic School. After completing her education in Krefeld, she served her goldsmith's apprenticeship with Herbert Seufert in Bad Godesberg near Bonn, receiving her journeyman's diploma in 1960. It was there she met her husband to be who was working with Seufert. The couple moved to Denmark where they were married in 1961 and set up a successful business together in the village of Hald near Randers.

Helga Exner was quickly recognized as a significant jewellery designer, creating geometrically-shaped items which could be hung on the wall or stand as decorations when not in use. After her marriage was dissolved, in 1986 she established her own workshop first in Aarhus, then in Odder, where she created small reliefs in silver, enamel and amber depicting landscapes, architecture or seabirds. Helga Exner's work has been widely exhibited, most recently in 2019 in Frederikshavn Kunstmuseum.
