= Hegen (surname) =

Hegen (German for 'cherish', 'nourish') is a German surname. Notable people with the surname include:

- Andrea Hegen, German Paralympian athlete
- Dieter Hegen (born 1962), German ice hockey player
- Hannes Hegen (1925–2014), German illustrator and caricaturist
- Josef Hegen (1907–1969), Czech-German politician and diplomat
- Manuel Hegen (born 1992), German footballer

== See also ==
- Hagen (surname)
- Heger, a surname
