= Helga Leitner =

Austrian geographer

Helga Leitner is an Austrian geographer. She is professor emerita at University of California, Los Angeles.

Leitner received her PhD in geography and urban and regional planning from the University of Vienna. She joined the faculty of University of Minnesota in 1985.

In 2007, she published Contesting Neo-liberalism: Urban Frontiers. In 2019, she published Everyday Equalities: Making Multicultures in Settler Colonial Cities.
