= Helga Jónsdóttir =

Icelandic academic

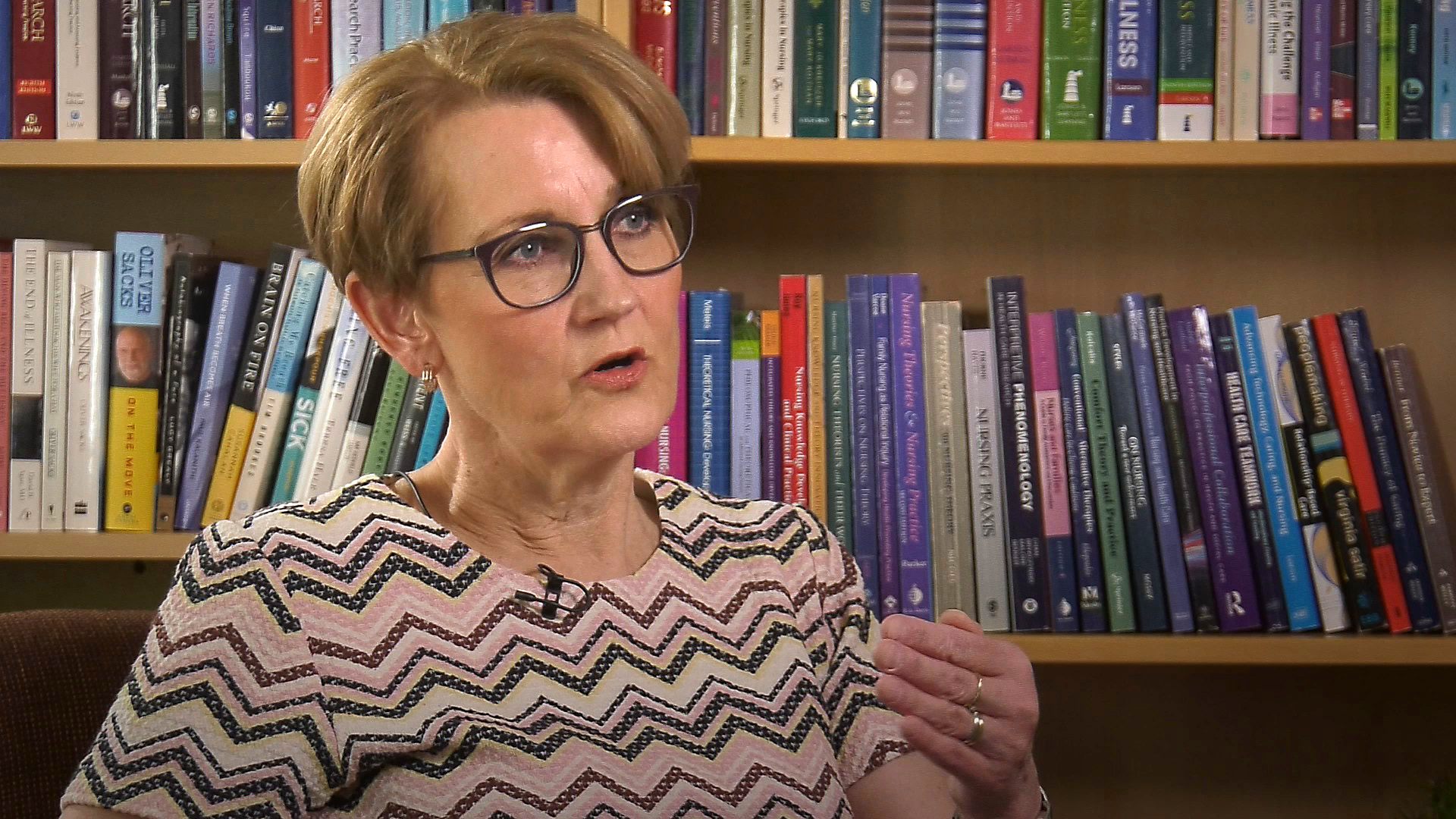
- Born: 1957 (age 68–69)
- Occupation: Professor in nursing at the Faculty of Nursing in the School of Health Sciences at the University of Iceland

Helga Jónsdóttir (born 1957) is a professor in nursing at the Faculty of Nursing in the School of Health Sciences at the University of Iceland and Academic Chair of Nursing Care for Chronically Ill Adults in a joint position at Landspítali the National University Hospital.

== Professional experience ==
Helga completed a BS in Nursing from the University of Iceland in 1981, a master's in Nursing at the University of Minnesota in the United States in 1988, and a doctorate in Nursing from the same school in 1995. From 1981 to 1986, Helga worked in clinical nursing at the National University Hospital, the Regional Hospital in Akureyri, the Regional Hospital in Húsavík, and the University Hospital in Oslo. In 1990, the Faculty of Nursing at the University of Iceland hired her as assistant professor, in 1996 as associate professor, and since 2003 as professor. In a joint position as professor, she conducts research and nursing practice development for chronically ill adults in the National University Hospital.

== Research ==
Helga has engaged in both qualitative and quantitative research and investigated the experience, symptoms, and condition of people with various long-term diseases, especially pulmonary and neurological diseases, and their families. She has also developed and researched nursing services based on partnership as practice, in collaboration with clinical nurse specialists and staff nurses at Landspítali.

In her doctoral project, Helga described the experience of people with lung diseases and developed research methods which became the basis of further research on nursing practice, particularly for lung patients. She later constructed a theoretical framework, in collaboration with her colleagues, Partnership to enhance self-management of people diagnosed with COPD and their families. This framework has been applied in studies in outpatient clinics, as well as in primary health care context chronically ill lung patients and their families. Helga has also researched smoking cessation treatment for lung patients and the use of inhaler devices for lung patients. Research on neurological patients has centred on developing methods for clinical assessment and treatment of individuals with hemispatial neglect following stroke, clinical instructions for nursing care and the development of ActivABLES, a technical intervention to promote home-based exercise and physical activity of community dwelling stroke survivors along with research on end-of-life care for neurological patients. Leadership training of nurses (NurseLEAD) is an international teaching and research project which Helga participates in on behalf of the Faculty of Nursing.

Helga has advised many master's and doctoral students and some post-doctorates at the University of Iceland. In addition to the above described topics, these projects have included symptoms and experience of various groups of clients including individuals experiencing cardiac arrest and those suffering vertebral fracture, as well as individuals with psoriasis and Parkinson's disease. Outcomes of nurse-managed follow-up for patients after discharge from the intensive care unit and the quality of life of people with chronic pain and their use of healthcare services have also been of focus in her work with graduate students.

Helga does her research in close collaboration with clinical specialists in nursing and other areas of the health sciences in both Iceland and abroad. Worth mentioning in this regard are the lung and neurology wards of Iceland's National University Hospital, the University Hospitals in Utrecht, the Netherlands, St. Catherine University in Minnesota, USA, a researcher in New Zealand and nursing researchers in several of the main universities in the Nordic countries.

== Other work and projects ==
Helga was Dean of the Faculty of Nursing 2013-2017 and has served in many administrative positions for the faculty. Examples include preparing the founding of the Institute of Nursing Research and directing it and chairing Graduate Studies Committee where she has participated in establishing and developing the graduate curriculum in nursing. She twice sat on a council of specialists of The Icelandic Centre for Research (RANNÍS), serving as the chairman of the council of professionals on clinical research and public health in 2013 and 2014.

== Acknowledgements ==
In 2017, Helga was made a Fellow of the American Academy of Nursing. She was selected as an honorary scientist of Landspítali the National University Hospital in 2019. In 2010, Helga was recognised as one of 100 Distinguished Nursing Alumni of the University of Minnesota for having advanced health care and done significant work in the nursing profession. In 2013, the Association of Pulmonary Nurses recognised Helga for her contribution to the development of nursing care for lung patients. On the 100th anniversary of the Icelandic Nurses Association Helga received an honorary grant for research on knowledge and the advancement of nursing in Iceland.

== Main publications ==
=== Articles ===
- Klinke, M.K., Hjaltason, H., Hafsteindóttir Th.B. & Jónsdóttir, H. (2016). Spatial neglect in stroke patients after discharge from rehabilitation to own home: a mixed method study. Disability & Rehabilitation, 38(25), 2429–2444.
- Klinke, M.K., Zahavi, D., Hjaltason, H., Thorsteinsson, B. & Jónsdóttir, H. (2015). "Getting the left right" – the experience of hemi-spatial neglect after stroke. Qualitative Health Research, 25(12), 1623–1636.
- Jonsdottir, H., Amundadottir, O.R., Gudmundsson, G., Halldorsdottir, B.S., Hrafnkelsson, B., Ingadottir, Þ.S., Jonsdottir, R., Jonsson, J.S., Sigurjonsdottir, E.D. & Stefansdottir, I.K. (2015). Effectiveness of a partnership based self-management program for patients with mild and moderate chronic obstructive pulmonary disease: A pragmatic randomized controlled trial. Journal of Advanced Nursing, 71(11), 2634–2649.
- Jonsdottir, H. & Ingadottir T.S. (2011). Health in partnership: Family nursing practice for people with breathing difficulties. Qualitative Health Research, 21(7), 927–935.
- Ingadottir, T.S. & Jonsdottir, H. (2010). Partnership-based nursing practice for people with chronic obstructive pulmonary disease and their families: Influences on health related quality of life and hospital admissions. Journal of Clinical Nursing, 19, 2795–2805.
- Litchfield, M. & Jonsdottir, H. (2008). A practice discipline that's here-and-now. Advances in Nursing Science, 31(1), 79–91.
- Jonsdottir, H., Litchfield, M. & Pharris, M.D. (2004). The relational core of nursing practice as partnership. Journal of Advanced Nursing, 47(3), 241–250.

=== Book and book chapters ===
- Hafsteinsdottir, Þ.B., Jónsdóttir, H., Kirkevold, M., Leino-Kilpi, H., Lomborg, K. & Hallberg, I.L. (eds.), Leadership in nursing: Experiences from the European Nordic Countries. Geneva, Switzerland, Springer Publ.
- Svavarsdottir, E.K. & Jonsdottir, H. (eds.)(2011). Family nursing in action. Reykjavik, Iceland: University of Iceland Press.
- Jónsdóttir, H. ed. (2006). From insight to action: Knowledge development in nursing and midwifery. [Frá innsæi til inngripa: Þekkingarþróun í hjúkrunar- og ljósmóðurfræði]. Reykjavík: The Literary Association and the Faculty of Nursing, University of Iceland.
