= Helga Sigurðardóttir =

Icelandic swimmer

Personal information
- Born: 23 April 1969 (age 57)

Sport
- Sport: Swimming

Helga Sigurðardóttir (born 23 April 1969) is an Icelandic freestyle swimmer. She competed in two events at the 1992 Summer Olympics.
