= Helga Ingólfsdóttir =

Icelandic harpsichordist (1942–2009)

Helga Ingólfsdóttir (25 January 1942 – 21 October 2009) was an Icelandic harpsichordist and festival director. She was a pioneer in historical performance practice in Iceland and the founder and artistic director of the Skálholt Music Festival.

== Career ==
Helga studied at the Reykjavík College of Music with Rögnvaldur Sigurjónsson, graduating as a pianist in 1963. She continued her studies in Germany, completing a soloist diploma from the University of Music and Theater in Munich under the tutelage of Hedwig Bilgram. She also participated in various masterclasses, for example with Gustav Leonhardt and Kenneth Gilbert.

She was the instigator, in 1975, of the Skálholt Music Festival, which still presents concerts in Skálholt church each summer. From the beginning until 2004 she was the festival's artistic director and gave many performances there herself. The festival has been an important promoter of both Baroque and contemporary music. In 1986 she established the Skálholt Bach Consort (Bachsveitin í Skálholti) which was a leading period performance ensemble in Iceland, also performing with musicians such as Jaap Schröder and Laurence Dreyfus. From 1972 to 2000 she taught harpsichord and baroque interpretation at the Reykjavík College of Music. She often appeared in concerts in the Nordic Countries, Austria, and the United States, frequently in collaboration with flautist Manuela Wiesler, with whom she had a close artistic collaboration.

Helga Ingólfsdóttir received various awards for her performances, recordings, and administrative leadership. In 1980 she was awarded the DV Culture Prize, and in 1994 the Brøste Optimism Prize. She was awarded Honorary Membership of the Icelandic Musician's Society in 2007. In 2001 she was made Commander of the Order of the Falcon for her contribution to music in Iceland. She received the Lifetime Achievement Award at the Icelandic Music Awards in 2004, and a year later won the Album of the Year award for her last CD.

Her biography, Helguleikur, Saga Helgu Ingólfsdóttur og Sumartónleika í Skálholti, written by the Icelandic flautist Kolbeinn Bjarnason, was published in 2018 and received positive reviews.

== Selected recordings ==
- Helga Ingólfsdóttir leikur á sembal (LP). Works by Johann Sebastian Bach. Fálkinn, 1984.
- Sumartónleikar í Skálholtskirkju (Summer Concerts in Skálholt Church, LP). Music by G.F. Handel and J.S. Bach. With Manuela Wiesler, flute. 1979.
- Bach í Skálholtskirkju (Bach in Skálholt Church, LP). Fálkinn, 1981.
- Johann Sebastian Bach: Goldberg Variations. Smekkleysa, 2000.
- Johann Sebastian Bach: Sonatas for violin and harpsichord. With Jaap Schröder, violin. Smekkleysa, 2000.
- Frá strönd til fjarlægra stranda. Works by J.S. Bach, Georg Böhm, Louis Couperin, and contemporary Icelandic composers. Smekkleysa, 2005.
