= Heger =

Heger (German for "gamekeeper") is a German surname, it may refer to:

- Altfrid Heger, German racing driver
- Anders Heger (born 1956), Norwegian publisher and writer
- Astrid Heppenstall Heger Professor of Clinical Pediatrics at the USC Keck School of Medicine in East Los Angeles
- Constantin Heger (1809–1896), Belgian teacher of the Victorian era
- Eduard Heger, Slovak politician, incumbent Prime Minister of Slovakia
- Eline Heger (1774–1842), Danish stage actress
- Leoš Heger, Czech politician
- Mary Lea Heger (1897–1983), founder of the Lick Observatory Archives
- Robert Heger (1886–1978), German conductor and composer
- Simpson Gumpertz & Heger Inc., engineering firm that designs, investigates, and rehabilitates structures and building enclosures
- Wanda Hjort Heger (1921–2017), Norwegian social worker who helped prisoners in World War II Nazi concentration camps

== See also ==
- Hegen (surname), people with this name
