= Helga Rullestad =

Norwegian politician

Helga Rullestad (born 27 March 1949) is a Norwegian politician for the Labour Party.

She was born on the island of Karmøy as a daughter of painter Harald Naley and housewife Olena Eilertsen. She took lower secondary education in Skudeneshavn, commerce school in Skien and upper secondary school in Kopervik. She held various jobs during her career.

She became involved in politics, and has been a member of the municipal council of Karmøy Municipality since 1987, since 1991 in the executive committee. She also served as a deputy representative to the Parliament of Norway from Rogaland during the terms 1997–2001 and 2001–2005.
