= Helga Kohl =

- Born: 1943 (age 81–82); Silesia, Poland
- Occupation: Photographer

Helga Kohl is a photographer born in Poland and based in Namibia whose work explores abandoned diamond mine towns in Namibia. Her main series of buildings in Kolmanskop show how the Namib desert's sands have reclaimed abandoned buildings. She is a member of the Professional Photographers in Southern Africa (PPSA) and her works have been exhibited and collected internationally, though especially prominent in Namibia.

== Early life ==
Helga Kohl was born in 1943 in Silesia, Poland. She emigrated to West Germany in 1958, where she studied photography and received a degree from the Münster Chamber of Trade. In 1970, Kohl moved to Namibia, where she has worked as a freelance photographer since 1975.

== Career ==
Her work has explored the abandoned diamond mining sites, particularly those of Kolmanskop in the southern Namib desert. Kohl's photographs capture how the mining town, abandoned in 1954, has been reclaimed by waves of sand. She returned to the site over several decades to capture the changing light, shadow, and architectural wear. During her visits, she would sit and watch the dunes shift in the rooms before deciding to photograph. The final series spent four years in production (1993–1997). Kohl's 1997 Elisabeth Bay series explored the abandoned Namibian diamond mining site by the same name. The mine was active between 1908 and 1948. Her pictures document the remnants of how people once occupied the mining town. Its desert-eroded ruins show both where people once lived and the effects of time and nature on human enterprise.

She joined the Professional Photographers in Southern Africa (PPSA) in 1989, received their President's Award in 1993, and was awarded a fellowship in fine art photography in 1998. Throughout the 1990s, she held solo exhibitions in Windhoek, Swakopmund, and Cape Town, and at the 1995 Miss Universe beauty pageant in the Namibian capital. Kohl participated in group exhibitions in Windhoek and Johannesburg, and in several Standard Bank Namibia biennales, of which she won first prize in 2001.

Her photographs were the "signature images" of the 2005 Rencontres Africaines de la Photographie, held in Bamako, Mali, after which they were exhibited internationally and donated to the Namibian national archives. Kohl published a book on the photographs, Kolmanskop: Past and Present, a year prior. In 2007, Kohl exhibited at Voies Off at Arles and began an artist residency in Bremen. Her photographs were also shown in a 2013 exhibition at the Washington, D.C.–based National Museum of African Art, Earth Matters: Land as Material and Metaphor in the Arts of Africa. Kohl's works reside in private collections internationally and in the public collection of the National Art Gallery of Namibia.
