= Helga Bergvall =

Swedish author

- Born: 16 March 1907; Uppland, Sweden
- Died: 20 June 1978 (aged 71); Stockholm, Sweden
- Occupations: maid, author

Helga Viktoria Bergvall (16 March 1907 – 20 June 1978) was a Swedish author.

== Biography ==
Bergvall was born on a farm in the Uppland region of Sweden. She left school at the age of 12 to work as a maid and moved to Stockholm together with her mother at the age of 14. In her later years Bergvall completed a correspondence course in creative writing and submitted manuscripts to a number of publishers before finally succeeding in having her first book published. Bergvall made her writing debut in 1975 at the age of 68 with the book Jungfru skär (trans.: "Virgin Pure") which tells the story of a young girl called Helga and her mother, Kristina, living in rural Sweden in the early 20th century. The book was followed by Jungfru vart tog du vägen? ("Virgo where did you go?") and Livslögnen ("The Lie of Life"), which together formed a trilogy. Her writing made her part of a wave of documentary-style female authors in the Swedish literature of the 1970's, and she received a prize from Samfundet De Nio (The Nine Society) for it. She died in 1978 and is buried in the Skogskyrkogården cemetery.
