= Dagmar C. G. Lorenz =

Dagmar C. G. Lorenz (born 1948) is Professor of German studies and from 2006 to 2010 served as Director of Jewish Studies at the University of Illinois at Chicago. She teaches and publishes on Austrian, German and German-Jewish literature and culture, and Holocaust studies. She was born in Goslar, West Germany and began her studies (German, English, Philosophy, Pedagogy) at the University of Göttingen (Germany). She completed her Ph.D. in German (1973) and her MA in English (1974) at the University of Cincinnati. She taught at Rutgers University/Douglass College (1974/5), Ohio State University, Columbus (1975-1982 Assistant Professor; 1982-1988 Associate Professor; 1989-1998 Professor), University of Illinois at Chicago (1998–present; Interim Head, Germanic Studies 2002–2003), and held a Visiting Professorship at the University of Chicago (2000). She served as the editor of The German Quarterly (1997-2003) and held offices with MLA, GSA, MALCA, and AATG.

== Books ==
- Keepers of the Motherland: German Texts by Jewish Women Writers (Lincoln: University of Nebraska Press, 1997), 432 pp.
- Verfolgung bis zum Massenmord. Diskurse zum Holocaust in deutscher Sprache (German Life and Civilization, ed. Jost Hermand) (Bern, New York: Lang, 1992), 452 pp.
- Franz Grillparzer — Dichter des sozialen Konflikts (Vienna, Cologne: Böhlau, 1986), 221 pp.
- Ilse Aichinger (Königstein: Athenäum, 1981), 259 pp.

== Edited volumes ==
- Elsa Porges-Bernstein alias Ernst Rosmer: Woman, Writer, Holocaust Survivor:a Critical Anthology (coedited with Helga W. Kraft, 2006),
- A Companion to the Works of Elias Canetti (2004)
- A Companion to the Works of Arthur Schnitzler (2003)
- Contemporary Jewish Writing in Austria (1999)
- Transforming the center, Eroding the Margins: Essays on Ethnic and Cultural Boundaries in German Speaking Countries (coedited with Renate S. Posthofen (1998))
- Insiders and Outsiders. Jewish and Gentile Culture in Germany and Austria (1994).
