= Helga Baum =

German mathematician (born 1954)

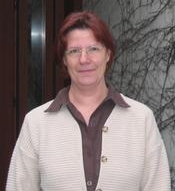
- Helga Baum in 2007.
- Born: Helga Dlubek; 1954 (age 71–72); German
- Education: Humboldt University of Berlin
- Occupations: mathematician, professor
- Scientific career
- Thesis: Spin-Strukturen und Dirac-Operatoren über Pseudoriemannschen Mannigfaltigkeiten (1980)

Helga Baum (née Dlubek, born 1954) is a German mathematician. She is professor for differential geometry and global analysis in the Institute for Mathematics of the Humboldt University of Berlin.

== Education ==
Baum earned a doctorate (Dr. sc. nat.) in mathematics in 1980 at the Humboldt University of Berlin. Her dissertation, Spin-Strukturen und Dirac-Operatoren über Pseudoriemannschen Mannigfaltigkeiten, was supervised by Thomas Friedrich.

== Books ==
Baum is the author or coauthor of several books, including:

- Conformal differential geometry: Q-curvature and conformal holonomy, with Andreas Juhl, Birkhäuser, 2010
- Eichfeldtheorie: Eine Einführung in die Differentialgeometrie auf Faserbündeln [Gauge theory: An introduction into differential geometry on fibre bundles] (Springer, 2009; 2nd ed., 2014)
- Twistor and Killing spinors on Riemannian manifolds, with Thomas Friedrich, Ralf Grunewald, and Ines Kath, Teubner, 1991
- Spin-Strukturen und Dirac-Operatoren über pseudoriemannschen Mannigfaltigkeiten [Spin structures and Dirac operators on pseudo-Riemannian manifolds], Teubner, 1981
