= Erla Þorsteinsdóttir (singer) =

Icelandic singer (1933–2022)

- Born: 22 January 1933; Sauðárkrókur, Kingdom of Iceland
- Died: 25 September 2022 (aged 89) Holbæk, Denmark
- Occupation: Singer
- Years active: 1953–1959
- Labels: Fálkinn; Odeon
- Spouse: Paul E. Danchell (m. 1955; died 1998)

Erla Þorsteinsdóttir (22 January 1933 – 25 September 2022) was an Icelandic singer who had considerable success in Iceland and Denmark in the 1950s. She first performed in Iceland in 1954 in the nightclub Jaðri. She sang one of the first Icelandic rock and roll songs called Vagg og velta which was controversially banned from playing in the state owned RÚV. In 1956, her single with the songs Heimþrá and Hljóðaklettur was the most sold record in Iceland.

== Personal life ==
Erla was born in Sauðárkrókur to Ingibjörg Konráðsdóttir and Þorsteinn Sigurðsson. She married Paul Eduard Danchell, the founder of the Danish electronic company Paul E. Danchell A / S, in 1955. Erla died on 25 September 2022 in a nursing home in Holbæk, Denmark. She had 4 children: Poul Eduard, Eva Ingibjörg, Stefan Thorstein and David Konrad Danchell, the 3 boys living in Denmark, the daughter living in the Netherlands. She had 5 grandchildren and 5 great-grandchildren when she died.
