= Jórunn Erla Eyfjörð =

Icelandic academic

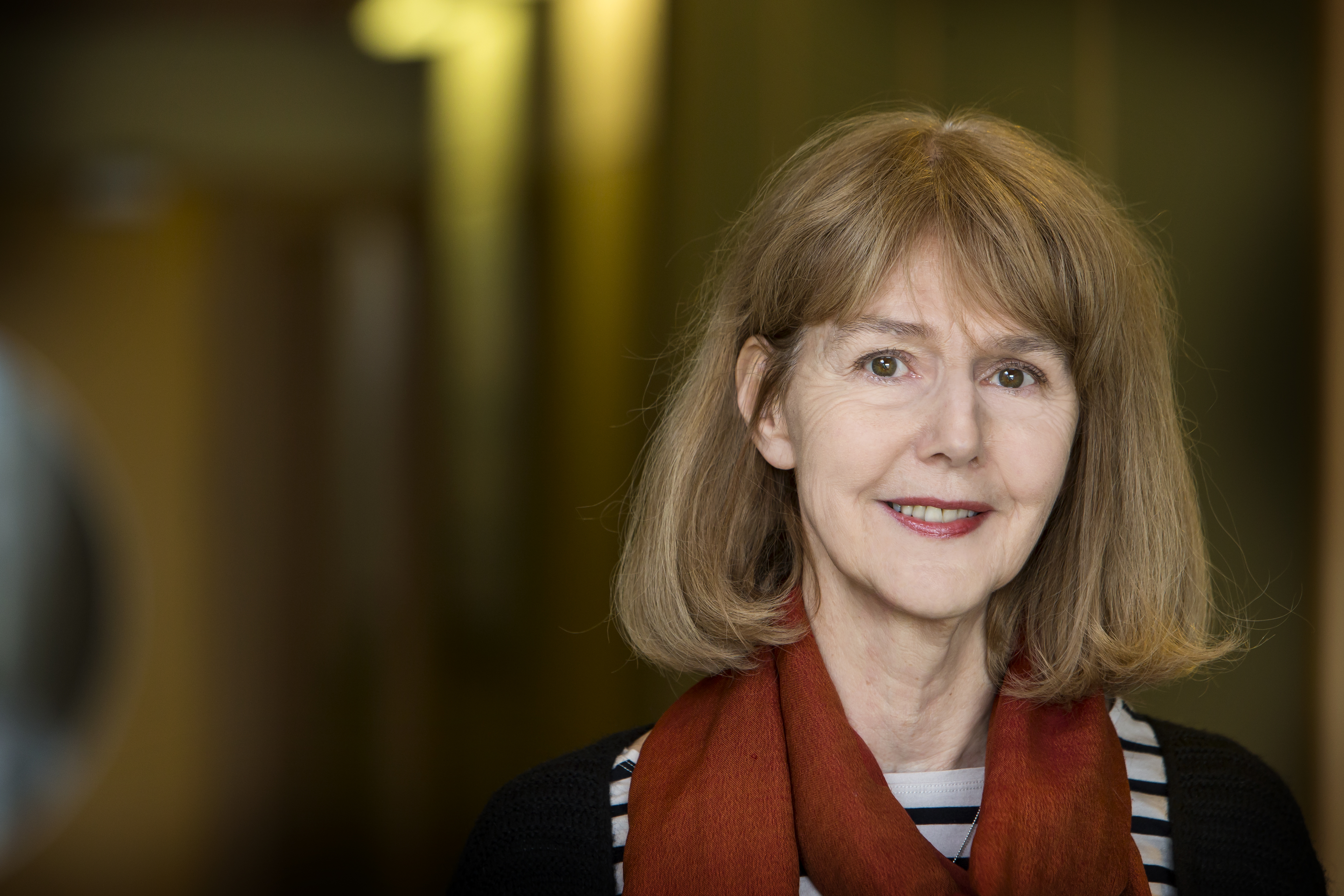
- Born: May 25, 1946 (age 79); Reykjavík
- Occupations: molecular biologist and professor emeritus at the Faculty of Medicine of the University of Iceland

Jórunn Erla Eyfjörð (born in Reykjavík on 25 May 1946) is an Icelandic molecular biologist and professor emerita at the Faculty of Medicine of the University of Iceland. She is known for her research on breast cancer genetics.

== Career ==
Jórunn Erla matriculated from the mathematics division of Reykjavik Junior College (Menntaskólinn í Reykjavik) in 1966. She did her undergraduate studies at the University of Iceland and University of Minnesota. She graduated with a BSc in biology from the University of Iceland in 1971. Along with her undergraduate studies she worked as an assistant to professor Gudmundur Eggertsson at his newly founded molecular genetics laboratory, at Keldur, Institute for Experimental Pathology. Jórunn continued her studies in molecular genetics at the MRC Cell Mutation Unit, University of Sussex, England, and completed her doctorate in 1976 on the topic of DNA repair, studying the processes by which a cell recovers from damage due to radiation.

From 1977 Jórunn continued her research at the University of Iceland, while also lecturing on molecular genetics, human genetics and cell biology at the Faculty of Natural Sciences and the Faculty of Medicine of the University of Iceland. In 1988 she was appointed to a post in the newly founded Molecular and Cell Biology Research Laboratory of the Icelandic Cancer Society to launch a research program in genetics.

In 2007, the laboratory was moved to the Faculty of Medicine and renamed the Cancer Research Laboratory. The laboratory then became part of the University of Iceland's fast-growing University of Iceland BioMedical Center. Jórunn was appointed Associate Professor at the Faculty of Medicine, University of Iceland, in 1998 and Professor 2005. Along with her teaching and research duties she has contributed to the University of Iceland in other ways, such as by chairing the Science Committee of the Faculty of Medicine (2002-2008), sitting on the Assessment Committee for Academic Qualifications (2002-2011, as chair 2008-2011) and Steering Board member of the Faculty of Medicine (2013-2016). She has supervised many students in master's and doctoral studies. She also contributed to Icelandic and foreign professional councils, such as the Icelandic Centre for Research, the Swedish Research Council, Vetenskabsradet, the Finnish Academy of Science and SciLifeLab in Sweden.

== Research ==
=== Discovery of an Icelandic BRCA2 founder mutation ===
Jórunn participated actively in the Breast Cancer Linkage Consortium, an international effort to find breast cancer risk genes. She benefited from important data contained in the Icelandic Cancer Registry, run by the Icelandic Cancer Society, and no less from the participation of cancer patients and their relatives. Linkage analysis on a family with several cases of male breast cancer showed linkage to the then recently discovered BRCA2 gene, on chromosome 13 (the first such gene BRCA1 had been known since 1990). Jórunn published these results on male breast cancer in the medical journal Lancet 1995. Her team participated in further definition of the BRCA2 gene on chromosome 13, and found an Icelandic mutation, BRCA2 999del5, in a male breast cancer case at the end of 1995. This mutation proved to be common among Icelandic breast cancer patients of both sexes and was also linked to an increased risk of prostate cancer. Although risk of prostate cancer is much lower than risk of female breast cancer among carriers of this founder mutation, it was shown to be strongly associated with poor prognosis. International studies confirmed this association of BRCA2 mutations with aggressive prostate cancer and this was followed up by the EU funded IMPACT study Targeted prostate cancer screening that has led to a number of publications regarding prostate cancer in BRCA1 and BRCA2 mutation carriers. Extensive studies on the population impact and clinical relevance of this BRCA2 founder mutation followed as well as studies on mutations and epigenetic inactivation of the BRCA1 gene in Icelandic cancer patients in collaboration with the Icelandic Cancer Registry and researchers at the National University Hospital.

=== Genomic instability in tumor cells ===
Along with studies on cancer genetics Jórunn studied chromosomal instability in breast tumor tissue using Fluorescence In Situ Hybridization (FISH) and chromosome painting. Chromosomal instability in breast tumors was shown to be associated with mutations in the tumor suppressor gene TP53. After the discovery of the Icelandic BRCA2 founder mutation Jórunn and her team demonstrated that complex chromosomal changes and end-to-end chromosome fusions were common in breast tumors from BRCA2 mutation carriers. These findings showed that cells lacking functional BRCA2 protein are prone to DNA damage and suggest that BRCA2 has a role in double strand break repair. This also suggested that the telomere sequences at the ends of chromosomes were more sensitive to BRCA2 related repair deficiencies than the rest of the genome.

=== International collaboration on cancer research ===
Jórunn's research group participated in The International Cancer Genome Consortium (ICGC), that defined mutation patterns that characterize 20 of the commonest human cancers. This was published in Nature 2013. Following this publication, more detailed research into breast cancer was published in Nature 2016 and also a detailed definition of subgroups of breast cancer with respect to newer treatments í Nature Medicine 2017. This research was the subject of a conference held in Jórunn's honor in May 2016 and also in a news item on UI's website.

=== Contribution to bioethics ===
Jórunn has contributed to the discussion surrounding the difficult ethical questions arising from rapid progress in genetics. She was a member of the Nordic Committee on Bioethics 1989–99, and chaired this committee 1994–99. She was also a member of the Ethical, Legal and Social Aspects Working Group (ELSA), a committee for life sciences ethics under EU auspices.

=== Science outreach ===
Jórunn has been very active in presenting her research to the general public. For example, in October 2014 she gave the first talk in a lecture series “Science in Plain Language”, sponsored by the University of Iceland. She has also held lectures and worked with Let's Walk Together, a support association that raises funds for breast cancer research. Jórunn has been very active in presenting her research to the general public.

== Awards ==
- Order of the Falcon 1996 (awarded by President Vigdís Finnbogadóttir).
- The Medical Faculty prize in recognition of her research 1995.
- The VÍS culture prize in recognition of research into cancer 1996.
- The Ása Wright prize in recognition of research in cancer genetics 2005.
- The University of Iceland prize for contributions to science 2007.
- The Icelandic Biological Society honorary prize for a successful scientific career 2019.

== Personal life ==
Jórunn's parents were Friða Stefánsdóttir Eyfjörð, sports teacher, (1915-1998) and Friðrik J. Eyfjörð, retail merchant, (1912-2003). She is married to Robert J. Magnus, mathematician and professor emeritus at the University of Iceland. They have two children.
