= Erla Kolbrún Svavarsdóttir =

Icelandic academic

Erla Kolbrún Svavarsdóttir (born 30 April 1961) is a Professor in the School of Health Sciences within the Faculty of Nursing at the University of Iceland and Director of the family nursing section in a connected position at Landspítali University Hospital. Erla Kolbrún has for decades placed an emphasis on development of teaching in family nursing, in addition to developing and testing measuring instruments and therapeutic research in the field of family nursing and researching violence in intimate relationships and adaptation of individuals and family members to acute or long-term physical and mental illnesses/disorders.

== Professional career ==
Erla Kolbrún completed a BSN degree from the Faculty of Nursing at the University of Iceland in 1987, Education Studies from the University of Iceland in 1988, Master's degree in Nursing (Clinical Nurse Specialist in Parent-Child Nursing) from the University of Wisconsin–Madison in the United States in 1993, and a Doctoral degree in Nursing from the same university in 1997. The PhD thesis of Erla Kolbrún, Family Adaptation for Families of an Infant or a Young Child with Asthma, covered the adaptation and ways of adaptation of young families with children who have asthma. Erla Kolbrún has attended to general nursing duties in the division of women's health and division of psychiatry at Landspítali University Hospital. In 1997, Erla Kolbrún was hired to the Faculty of Nursing at the University of Iceland and worked full-time in the Faculty as Assistant Professor until 2000 when she was promoted to the position of Associate Professor. In 2006, she was appointed Professor at the same university. Alongside her work as Professor, Erla Kolbrún is Director of the family nursing section at Landspítali University Hospital.

== Research ==
Erla Kolbrún has worked on developing and testing results from strengths-oriented therapeutic conversations for individuals and their families who have various disease diagnoses and/or disorders. Together with her fellow researchers at Landspítali University Hospital, she has, for example, researched families of children and adolescents with serious physical and mental diseases/disorders, such as families dealing with cancer, diabetes, asthma, ADHD, eating disorders, arthritis, epilepsy, kidney diseases or liver disease. From 1997, Erla Kolbrún has, both in Iceland and the United States, researched persistence, resilience, coping, health-related quality of life, well-being and adaptation of Icelandic and foreign families when one family member has a long-term illness. Results from more than two decades of research by Erla Kolbrún and her fellow researchers led to the development of strengths-oriented therapeutic conversations for individuals dealing with various illnesses/health problems and their families. The therapeutic conversations are based on the ideology of family nursing and four new questionnaires have also been developed to assess the results of strengths-oriented therapeutic conversations in clinical settings. The benefit of her research has led to increased emphasis on the importance of family nursing within the health service both in Iceland and abroad.

Erla Kolbrún has also researched family-based services among nurses and midwives, and its interplay with job satisfaction and with skills and competences in family nursing. In addition, she has for many years organised a national survey and clinical research projects concerning violence in intimate partner relationships among female university students, women in high-risk prenatal units and among women in the accident and emergency unit of Landspítali University Hospital.

Erla Kolbrún has mentored numerous Master's and Doctoral students at the University of Iceland and has been involved in mentoring of Doctoral students at foreign universities. In addition, she has engaged in active research collaboration with nursing specialists and midwives at Landspítali University Hospital, with nurses and midwives within the Primary Health Care of the Capital Area and with nurses at Akureyri Hospital (SAk). She has furthermore participated in international research collaboration with researchers in the United States (University of Minnesota School of Nursing, University of Wisconsin-Madison and University of Kentucky-Lexington), and with researchers in the Nordic countries and Europe (FAME-RN research group), that is, at the University of Groningen in the Netherlands, University of Pamplona in Spain, University of Turku in Finland and the University of Southern Denmark, University of Copenhagen and Aarhus University.

== Various tasks and recognitions ==
Erla Kolbrún has held various commissions of trust for the Faculty of Nursing and School of Health Sciences at the University of Iceland. She, for example, served as Head of the Faculty of Nursing during the period 2003–2007 and has furthermore had a seat on the doctoral studies committee and science committee of the School of Health Sciences and in the Faculty Council and research-based study committee of the Faculty of Nursing. In addition, she has participated in developing postgraduate study programmes in the Faculty, was Chair of the curriculum committee of BS studies in the Faculty, and had a seat on the board of the Research Institute of Nursing where she also served as Chair during 2008–2010. Erla Kolbrún is a member of the Editorial Board of the Journal of Family Nursing and the Editorial Board of the Nordic Journal of Nursing Research.

Erla Kolbrún was awarded the Honorary Scientist Award at Landspítali University Hospital in 2014. She was accepted into the American Academy of Nursing in 2015 and has been a member of the International Family Nursing Association from 2009.

== Main written works ==
=== Articles ===
- Svavarsdottir. E. K., & Gisladottir, M. (2019). How Do Family Strengths-Oriented Therapeutic Conversations (FAM-SOTC) Advance Psychiatric Nursing Practice? - Journal of Nursing Scholarship, 512, 214–224.
- Svavarsdottir, E. K., & Tryggvadottir, G. B. (2019). Predictors of quality of life for families of children and adolescents with severe physical illnesses who are receiving hospital-based care. Scandinavian Journal of Caring Sciences, 33, 698–705.
- Svavarsdottir, E. K., Gisladottir, M., & Tryggvadottir, B. (2019). Perception on family support and predictors' of satisfaction with the healthcare service among families of children and adolescents with serious mental illnesses who are in active psychiatric treatment. Journal of Child and Adolescent Psychiatric Nursing, vol. 32(1), p. 6-15.
- Svavarsdottir, E. K., Sigurdardottir, A. O., Konradsdottir, E., & Tryggvadottir, G. B. (2018). The impact of nursing education and job characteristics on nurse's perceptions of their family nursing practice skills. Scandinavian Journal of Caring Sciences, vol. 32(4), p 1297–1307.
- Svavarsdottir, E. K., Looman W., Tryggvadottir, G. B., & Garwick, A. Psychometric testing of the Iceland Health Care practitioner Illness Beliefs Questionnaire among School Nurses. (2018). Scandinavian Journal of Caring Sciences, 32(1), 261–269.
- Svavarsdottir, E. K., Sigurdardottir, A O., Konradsdottir, E., Stefansdottir, A., Sveinbjarnardottir E. K., Ketilsdottir, A., Blondal, B., Jonsdottir, A. Bergs, D. & Gudmundsdottir H. (2015). The Process of Translating Family Nursing Knowledge into Clinical Practice, Journal of Nursing Scholarship, 47(1), 5-15.
- Svavarsdottir, E. K., & Orlygsdottir, B. (2015). Can abuse disclosure function as a protective factor for women who are victims of Intimate Partner Violence in current marital/partner relationships? Journal of Forensic Nursing, April–June, 11, 2, 84–92.
- Svavarsdottir, E. K., Orlygsdottir, B., & Gudmundsdottir, B. (2014). Reaching out to Women who are Victims of Intimate Partner Violence. Perspective in Psychiatry Care, 51(3).

=== Books ===
- Erla Kolbrún Svavarsdottir og Helga Jonsdottir. (2011). Family Nursing in Action. Erla Kolbrún Svavarsdóttir and Helga Jónsdóttir, Ritstjórar (eds.). University of Iceland Press, University of Iceland, Reykjavik (406 pages).
- Erla Kolbrún Svavarsdottir. (2010). Ofbeldi margbreytileg birtingarmynd. Erla Kolbrun Svavarsdottir, ritstjóri (ed.). Háskólaútgáfan, (185 pages).
