= Helga W. Kraft =

German-American Professor of Germanic Studies

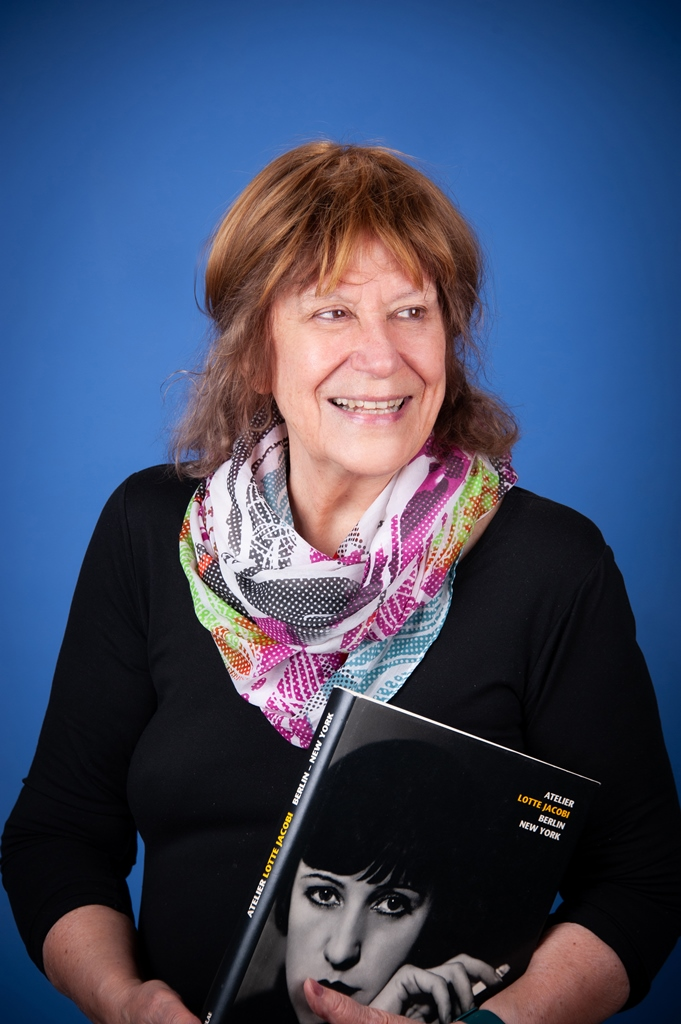
Helga W. Kraft, 2022.

Helga W. Kraft (born in Berlin, Germany), is a German-American Professor of Germanic Studies, Emerita.

== Life ==
Kraft grew up in East-Berlin, Germany, but soon relocated to Western Germany; she emigrated to the US in 1958. She pursued German Studies at the University of California, Berkeley, and obtained the Ph.D. in 1970. Subsequently Kraft held tenure track positions at Westminster College, Pennsylvania; University of Kansas; Florida State University, Tallahassee, FL; the University of Florida, Gainesville, FL; the University of Illinois at Chicago.

In addition to scholarly research and teaching (she received Teacher of the Year award twice), she organised teacher workshops, established various faculty and student exchange programs with German universities, and promoted German culture in the US through initiating conferences, film series, exhibits, and lectures. She worked with the Goethe Institut and German Consulates in New York, Chicago and Atlanta and received an Award for Distinguished Service in the International Field from the German Consulate, Atlanta.

As a director of Women’s Studies (1990 – 1995), she founded the Center for Women’s Studies and Gender Research at the University of Florida; as a full professor she headed the Department of Germanic Studies at the University of Illinois at Chicago (1997-2010). For three years she was active as the editor of the Women in German Yearbook: Feminist Studies in German Literature and Culture (2005-2007). Since 2010 she has been Professor Emerita at the University of Illinois at Chicago.

She was married to economist Dr. Richard H. P. Kraft (†) and has one daughter. After her official retirement in 2010 she moved to Berlin, Germany, where she now continues her research.

== Main research and teaching interests ==
Focus on (1) general Germanic studies, i.e. books and articles on Goethe, Kleist, and Canetti; (2) drama of German speaking countries, i.e. books and articles on women dramatists and plays, xenophobia on the German stage; (3) gender theory and women’s studies, i.e. articles and book chapters on Charlotte Birch-Pfeiffer, Ida Hahn-Hahn, Elsa Bernstein, Elisabeth Langgässer, Ingeborg Drewitz, Christa Wolf, Gerlind Reinshagen, Elfriede Jelinek, Marlene Streeruwitz, Herta Müller. (4) Applied linguistics, i.e. a basic German textbook for U.S. college students, articles on teaching methodology.

== Selected bibliography ==
Books
Flight and Displacement. Representations of World War II Refugee Experiences in Memoirs, Fiction, and Film. Editor and contributor. Coeditor Martha Wallach, Lewiston, NY: Mellen Press, 2012.

Eine Welt aus Sprache. Die Werke von Gerlind Reinshagen. Eine kritische Anthologie. Editor and contributor. Mit einer Einführung und einer kritischen Betrachtung von Reinshagens Gesamtwerk. Coeditor: Therese Hoernigk, Berlin: Verlag Theater der Zeit, 2007.

From Fin de Siècle to Theresienstadt. The Works and Life of Elsa Porges-Bernstein. Editor and contributor. Coeditor: D. Lorenz. New York: Peter Lang, 2007.

Writing against Boundaries. Nationality, Ethnicity and Gender in the German-speaking Context. Coeditor Barbara Kosta, Amsterdam, New York: Rodopi Press, 2003. 223 pp.

Ein Haus aus Sprache: Dramatikerinnen und das andere Theater, Stuttgart: Metzler Verlag, 1996, 248 pp. Monograph.

Mütter – Töchter – Frauen. Weiblichkeitsbilder in der Literatur. Editor and contributor. Coeditor: Elke Liebs, Stuttgart: Metzler Verlag 1993, 346 pp.

Die Welt des Klanges. Musikalische Zeichen in Heinrich von Kleists Werken. Munich: Fink Verlag, 1976, 183 pp. Monograph.

Auf Deutsch, Kompetenz durch kommunikatives Lernen A First Year College Text. With Workbook, Instructors’ Manual, und Computer Program. Coauthor: Barbara Kosta. Englewood: Prentice Hall, 1991. 483 pp.

Recent articles and chapter

"Xenophobia and the Stranger as Vampire in Efriede Jelinek‘s and Nikolas Mahler‘s „Der fremde! störenfried der ruhe eines sommerabends der ruhe eines friedhofs.“ A Slapstick Play of the Mind." In progress. Publication 2024.

„Die Macht der Überwachung: Marlene Streeruwitz.“ Die Schmerzmacherin. schreibt Kafka neu.“ Journal of Austrian Studies", Volume 55, Number 1, 2022, pp. 25–51.

„Kafka in Comics. Unter besonderer Berücksichtigung von Moritz Stetters Das Urteil.“ Colloquia Germanica, Vol. 48, No. 4, Themenheft: German Comics. 2016, pp. 293–316.

Milo Rau as Influencer. A New Realism in Theater, Theater - Yale’s Journal of Criticism, Plays, & Reportage. Vol. 51:2, 2021. 39-47.

"Provocations for the Future. Gender Studies and Wissenschaftlichkeit in Germany." Women in German Yearbook, Feminist Studies in German Literature & Culture. 2014, Vol. 30, p. 107-124.

“Mächtige Männer in der Krise. Kreuzungen. Von Marlene Streeruwitz.“ Frauenphantasien. Der imaginierte Mann im Werk von Film- und Buchautorinnen. Ed. Renate Möhrmann. Stuttgart: Alfred Kröner, 2014. 548-563.

“Herta Müller,“ Berühmte Frauen 2013.” Ed. Luise Pusch. Berlin: Suhrkamp Verlag, 2012.

"Goethes Farbenlehre und Das Märchen -- Farbmagie oder -wissenschaft?“ In: Die Farben imaginierter Welten, Zur Kulturgeschichte ihrer Codierung in Literatur und Kunst vom Mittelalter bis zur Gegenwart. Ed. Monika Schausten. Berlin: Akademie Verlag, 2012.

“Christa Wolf’s Himmelsrichtungen.” In: Konzept Osteuropa. Der „Osten“ als Konstrukt der Fremd- und Eigenbestimmung in deutschsprachigen Texten des 19. Und 20. Jahrhunderts. Eds. Dagmar Lorenz and Ingrid Spörk. Würzburg: Königshausen & Neumann. 2011.

„Das Theater als moralische Anstalt? Deutsche Identität und die Migrantenfrage auf der Bühne.“ In Geschlechter Spiel Räume: Dramatik, Theater, Performance und Gender. Eds. Franziska Schlössler and Gabi Pailer. Frankfurt: Peter Lang, 2010.
