= List of Icelandic composers =

The composers in this list are those notable ones having Icelandic nationality, or whose main residence is Iceland. Icelandic names differ from most current Western family name systems by being patronymic (occasionally matronymic) in that they reflect the immediate father (or mother) of the child and not the historic family lineage.

This list is in alphabetical order by given name according to the Icelandic alphabet.

== A to D ==
- Áki Ásgeirsson (born 1975)
- Anna Mjöll Ólafsdóttir (fl. 1970)
- Anna S. Þorvaldsdóttir (born 1977)
- Árni Guðjónsson (born 1988)
- Arnór Dan Arnarson (born 1985)
- Atli Heimir Sveinsson (1938–2019)
- Atli Ingólfsson (born 1962)
- Atli Örvarsson (born 1970)
- Bára Gísladóttir (born 1989)
- Björgvin Guðmundsson (1891–1961)
- Björk (born 1965)

== E to K ==
- Egill Ólafsson (born 1953)
- Elias Davidsson (1941-2022)
- Emil Thoroddsen (1898–1944)
- Eydís Evensen
- Gabríel Ólafs (1998)
- Guðmundur Steinn Gunnarsson (born 1982)
- Gyða Valtýsdóttir (born 1982)
- Hafdís Bjarnadóttir (born 1977)
- Hafliði Hallgrímsson (born 1941)
- Hallgrímur Helgason (1914–1994)
- Haraldur Vignir Sveinbjörnsson (born 1975)
- Haukur Tómasson (born 1960)
- Herbert H. Ágústsson (1926-2017)
- Hildur Guðnadóttir (born 1982)
- Hilmar Örn Hilmarsson (born 1958)
- Hitesh Ceon (born 1974)
- Jakob Frímann Magnússon (born 1953)
- Jóhann Jóhannsson (1969–2018)
- Jón Jónsson (born 1985)
- Jón Laxdal (1865-1928)
- Jón Leifs (1899–1968)
- Jón Nordal (1926-2024)
- Jórunn Viðar (born 1918)
- Karólína Eiríksdóttir (born 1951)
- Kjartan Ólafsson (born 1958)

== L to R ==
- Magnús Blöndal Jóhannsson (1925-2005)
- Páll Ragnar Pálsson (born 1977)
- Ólafur Arnalds (born 1986)
- Oliver Kentish (born 1954)

== S to Ö ==
- Sigvaldi Kaldalóns (1881–1946)
- Skúli Sverrisson (born 1966)
- Steingrimur Rohloff (born 1971)
- Sveinbjörn Sveinbjörnsson (1847–1927)
- Sveinn Rúnar Sigurðsson (born 1976)
- Úlfur Hansson (born 1988)
- Veigar Margeirsson (born 1972)
- Þorkell Sigurbjörnsson (1938–2013)
- Þráinn Hjálmarsson (born 1987)
- Þórir Baldursson (born 1944)
- Örlygur Smári (born 1971)
