= Dark Music Days =

Icelandic music festival

Dark Music Days (Myrkir músíkdagar in Icelandic) is an Icelandic festival of contemporary music held annually in January in Reykjavík. Established in 1980 and arranged by the Icelandic Composers' Society, it is the leading festival of contemporary music in Iceland and one of the country's oldest music festivals.

== History ==
The Dark Music Days festival was first held in January 1980 under the leadership of composers Atli Heimir Sveinsson and Þorkell Sigurbjörnsson, who were then in charge of the Icelandic Composers' Society. The idea was to create a vehicle for the performance of contemporary music by local composers. The organizers already had some experience in festival administration, having organized the ISCM festival in 1973, and the Nordic Music Days in 1976. They chose the month of January for the festival, since new music might be welcome in the darkness that envelops Iceland at that time of the year. It is the second oldest music festival in Iceland, after the Skálholt Music Festival (established in 1975); the multidisciplinary Reykjavík Arts Festival is also older (established in 1970) but, unlike the others, is not an annual event.

The first concert of the inaugural festival was given at Hamrahlíð College on 17 January 1980 and featured the Iceland Symphony Orchestra, conducted by Paul Zukofsky in works by six composers, including Atli Heimir Sveinsson, Jón Leifs, Jón Ásgeirsson, and Jón Þórarinsson.

In its early years, the festival concerts took place at various venues throughout Reykjavík, including Hamrahlíð College, Háskólabíó Cinema, and Kjarvalsstaðir. Since the opening of Harpa Concert Hall in 2011, it has been a hub for the festival though some concerts have taken place in other locations. In recent decades, between 2,500 and 3,000 people have attended each festival. The festival has expanded gradually through the years; the first festival featured five concerts in 10 days, while the 2010 iteration featured 24 concerts in 8 days. In recent years, the festival has expanded to include international collaborations, such as with the Huddersfield Contemporary Music Festival and New Music Dublin.

The Dark Music Days festival has been a key venue for local performers and composers. Among key performers have been the Iceland Symphony Orchestra, the Reykjavík Chamber Orchestra, CAPUT Ensemble, and the Hamrahlíð Choir. In the festival's early years, flautist Manuela Wiesler and conductor Paul Zukofsky were also among leading performers. Virtually all Icelandic composers of contemporary classical music have had their works premiered at the festival, including Atli Heimir Sveinsson, Þorkell Sigurbjörnsson, Anna Þorvaldsdóttir and Daníel Bjarnason.

== Premieres (selected) ==
- 1980: Atli Heimir Sveinsson: Hreinn SÚM 74. Reykjavík Chamber Orchestra, cond. Paul Zukofsky.
- 1983: Atli Heimir Sveinsson: Haustmyndir (Autumn Pictures). The Hamrahlíð Choir, cond. Þorgerður Ingólfsdóttir.
- 1985: Jónas Tómasson: Sonata XV. Anna Áslaug Ragnarsdóttir, piano.
- 1991: Hróðmar I. Sigurbjörnsson: Ljóðasinfónía (Symphony of Songs). Iceland Symphony Orchestra, the Hamrahlíð Choir, cond. Petri Sakari.
- 1991: Hjálmar H. Ragnarsson: Adagio. Le sextuor á cordes de Lille.
- 2009: Daníel Bjarnason: Processions (piano concerto). Víkingur Ólafsson, Iceland Symphony Orchestra, cond. Daníel Bjarnason.
- 2011: Daníel Bjarnason: Emergence. Iceland Symphony Orchestra, cond. Daníel Bjarnason.
- 2016: Áskell Másson: Gullský. Melkorka Ólafsdóttir, Iceland Symphony Orchestra, cond. Daníel Bjarnason.
- 2016: Þórður Magnússon: Piano Concerto. Víkingur Ólafsson, Iceland Symphony Orchestra, cond. Daníel Bjarnason.
- 2019: María Huld Markan Sigfúsdóttir: Oceans. Iceland Symphony Orchestra, cond. Daníel Bjarnason.
- 2019: Páll Ragnar Pálsson: Crevace, concerto for flute and bassoon. Iceland Symphony Orchestra, cond. Daníel Bjarnason.

== External sites ==
Dark Music Days homepage
