= Gísli Magnússon =

Icelandic pianist (1929–2001)

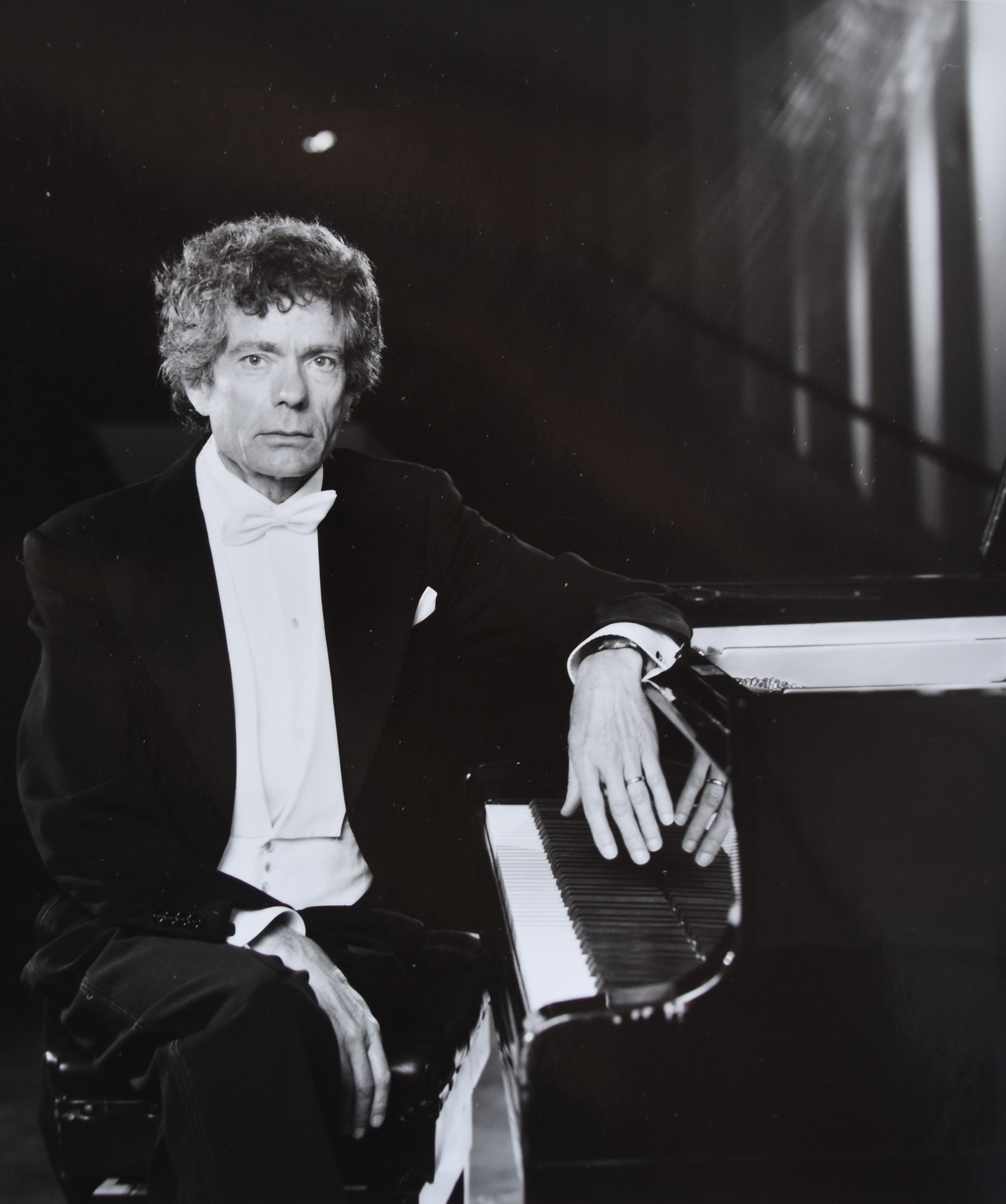
Gísli Magnússon

Gísli Magnússon (5 February 1929 – 28 May 2001) was an Icelandic pianist. His career spanned more than half a century.

== Biography ==
Gísli Magnússon was born on 5 February 1929 Eskifjörður, Iceland. He started piano lessons in 1939, at the age of ten. He studied in Reykjavík, Zurich and Rome. In the first three years he studied with Icelandic pianist Rögnvaldur Sigurjónsson who had himself recently returned from studying in Paris. Gísli continued to study piano at the Reykjavik College of Music and graduated in 1949. From there he went on to study with Swiss pianist Walter Frey and graduated as a solo pianist in 1953 from Zürich University of the Arts. In 1954 he played his first concert with the Iceland Symphony Orchestra under conductor Olav Kielland and received rave reviews. The same year he was awarded a one-year grant from the Italian state and studied in Rome under the supervision of Italian pianist Carlo Zecchi.

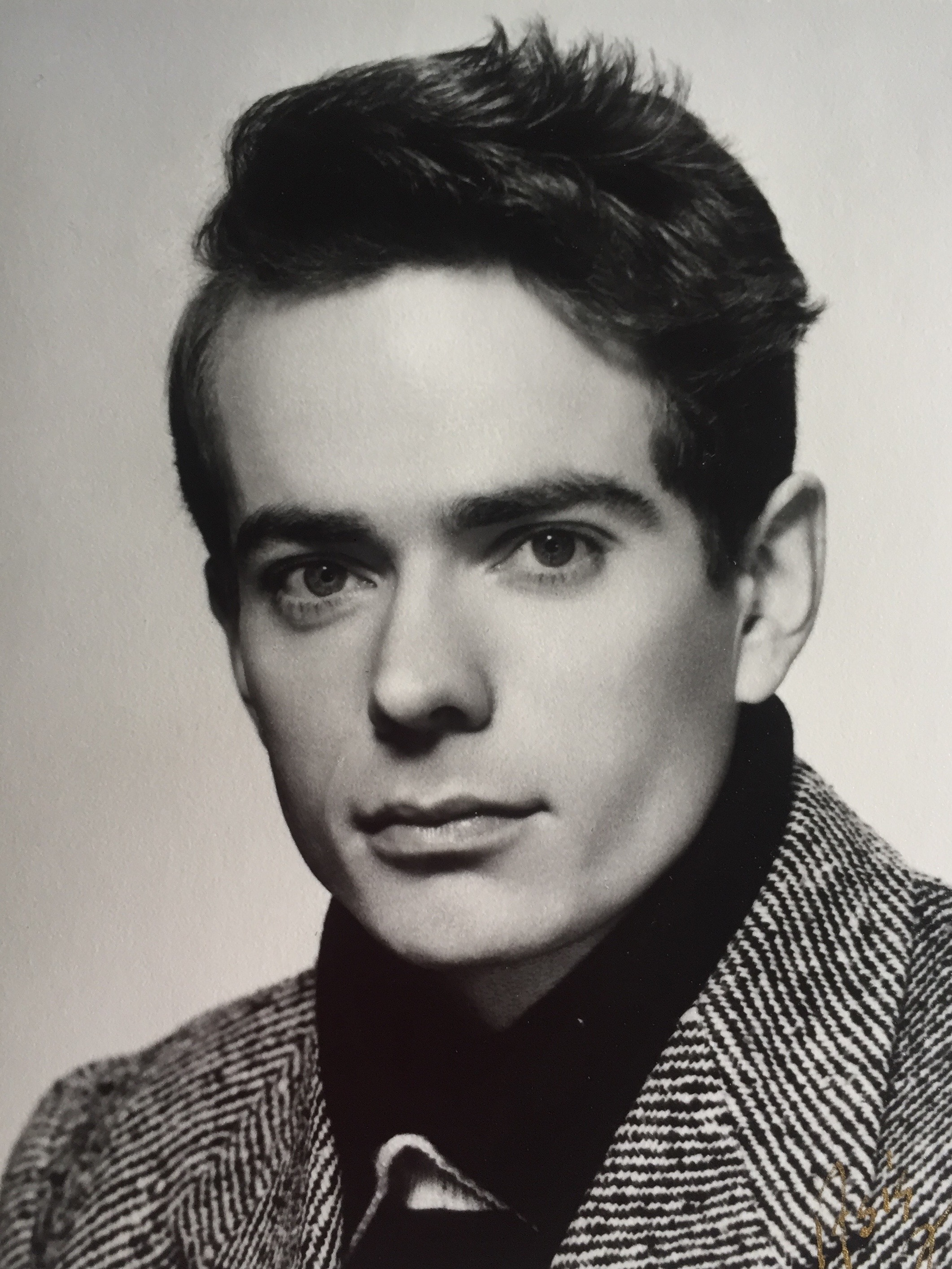
Young Gísli Magnússon

Gísli Magnússon was very active in the Icelandic music scene and appeared in countless concerts, both live and on radio and television. He made many recordings, both as a solo pianist and together with other musicians, in particular cellist Gunnar Kvaran and pianist Halldór Haraldsson. During his career he gained considerable international reputation, and in 1977 he was invited to perform a piano concert by composer Jón Nordal, at the opening concert of the Bergen Music Festival. In 1979 he played a concert together with Gunnar Kvaran at Carnegie Hall in New York. Magnússon appeared in eighteen concerts as a solo pianist with the Iceland Symphony Orchestra in the years 1954 to 1989. He also taught piano throughout his career and was the headmaster of Garðabær College of Music from 1985 to 1999. Gísli was the main external examiner for piano at the Reykjavik College of Music for the majority of his professional life.

In 2004 a CD with Gísli Magnússon's best known recordings, Gísli Magnússon: Píanó, was released by music label Bad Taste Record Label (Icelandic: Smekkleysa). It includes among others compositions English Suite in D Minor by J.S. Bach, Humoresques by Páll Ísólfsson and Vikivaki by Sveinbjörn Sveinbjörnsson.

He died on 28 May 2001 in Reykjavík.
