= Jón Þórarinsson =

Icelandic composer (1917–2012)

Jón Þórarinsson (13 September 1917 – 12 February 2012) was an Icelandic composer, teacher, and administrator. He was a leading personality in Icelandic culture in the 20th century, particularly in his positions for the Icelandic National Radio and Iceland Symphony Orchestra.

== Career ==
Jón Þórarinsson was born in Gilsárteigur, Suður-Múlasýsla in eastern Iceland. He studied at Akureyri Junior College, graduating in 1937. His earliest surviving songs were written during this time, when he studied with the local choir conductor and composer Björgvin Guðmundsson. He moved to Reykjavík in 1937, studying composition and music theory with Franz Mixa and Victor Urbancic at the Reykjavík College of Music. At the same time, he began working at the music division of the National Radio.

In 1944, he left Iceland to study with Paul Hindemith at Yale University, completing his BM-degree in 1945 and MM-degree in 1947. He also attended a summer course in orchestration with Vittorio Giannini at the Juilliard School in 1945. Upon his return to Iceland in 1947, he became head of music theory and composition at the Reykjavík College of Music (1947–1968). Among his students there were Jón Nordal, Leifur Þórarinsson, Jón Ásgeirsson, and Fjölnir Stefánsson, all of whom would later become among the leading Icelandic composers of their generation. He played a key role in establishing the Iceland Symphony Orchestra in 1950, serving as its first board chairman (1950–1953) and Managing Director (1956–1961). He worked for the National Radio, as well as leading the division of arts and entertainment at the Icelandic Television (1968–1979). He was also a conductor, conducting the male choir Fóstbræður from 1950–1954. He was music critic for the newspapers Alþýðublaðið (1948–1950) and Morgunblaðið (1962–1968).

Jón Þórarinsson received many honors and awards for his compositional and administrative work. He was made a Commander of the Order of the Falcon in 1978, and a Grand Commander (stórriddarakross) in 1989 by the President of Iceland, for his contribution to Icelandic musical culture. He was the author of several books, including a biography of Sveinbjörn Sveinbjörnsson (1969) and a history of Icelandic music (Íslensk tónlistarsaga 1000–1800), published posthumously in 2012.

== Music ==
Jón Þórarinsson's earliest works are in a relatively simple, melodic style. His studies with Hindemith in the 1940s led him to adapt a more modern musical language based on that of his teacher, as can be heard in his student works from that time (Piano Sonatina; Clarinet Sonata). Later in life, Jón composed rather infrequently, since his various other duties did not allow it. Only when commissioned did he write larger works, and he gradually returned to the late-romantic style of his earlier years. An exception to this is Brek (Prank) for flute and harpsichord, which employs serial technique. Völuspá, a large cantata for choir and orchestra, was commissioned and premiered to celebrate the 1100-year anniversary of settlement in Iceland. His last completed work, Te Deum, was given its first performance in January 2001.

Þórarinsson's songs, such as Fuglinn í fjörunni, are among the most popular Icelandic songs for voice and piano and have been recorded various times. Several of his choral arrangements have also become popular, for example his arrangement of the Icelandic folk songs Blástjarnan (1976) and Komdu nú að kveðast á (1981), and of the Lutheran hymns Jesú, mín morgunstjarna and Oss barn er fætt í Betlehem. He is also the author of the orchestral arrangement of the Icelandic national anthem, Ó, Guð vors lands (Lofsöngur).

A 3-CD anthology of nearly all of his compositions was released in 1998 (Fuglinn í fjörunni) and was praised as a significant release.

== Selected works ==
- Fuglinn í fjörunni (The Bird on the Shore, voice and piano, text: folk poetry), ca. 1937
- Íslenskt vögguljóð á hörpu (Icelandic Spring Lullaby, voice and piano, text: Halldór Laxness), ca. 1937
- Sonatina for piano (1945)
- Sonata for clarinet and piano (1947)
- Sólarkvæði (Poem to the Sun) for SATB choir (text: Bjarni Gissurarson, ca. 1948)
- Of Love and Death, for baritone and piano/orchestra (text: Christina Rossetti, 1950)
- Völuspá (The Song of the Sibyl) for SATB choir and orchestra (1974)
- Brek for flute and harpsichord (1981)
- Vakna þú, sál mín (Awake, My Soul) for SATB choir (1991)
- Dáið er alt án drauma (All has Died without Dreams, voice and piano, text: Halldór Laxness), 1994
- Te Deum for soprano, tenor, SATB choir, and chamber orchestra (2000)

== Selected recordings ==
- Fuglinn í fjörunni and Íslenskt vögguljóð á Hörpu. Gunnar Guðbjörnsson and Jónas Ingimundarson. Skífan, 1992.
- Blástjarnan and Jesú, mín morgunstjarna (arr.). On Íslensk þjóðlög (Icelandic Folk Songs). The Hamrahlíð Choir, cond. Þorgerður Ingólfsdóttir. Iceland Music Information Center, 1993.
- Oss barn er fætt í Betlehem (arr.). On Íslenskir jólasöngvar og Maríukvæði. The Hamrahlíð Choir, cond. Þorgerður Ingólfsdóttir. Iceland Music Information Center, 1996.
- Of Love and Death. Kristinn Hallsson, Iceland Symphony Orchestra, cond. Páll P. Pálsson. Edda, 2002.
- Sólarkvæði. On Vorkvæði um Ísland. The Hamrahlíð Choir, cond. Þorgerður Ingólfsdóttir. Smekkleysa SMK 22, 2002.
- Völuspá. On Fuglinn í fjörunni. Kristinn Sigmundsson, Iceland Symphony Orchestra, Icelandic Opera Chorus, cond. Petri Sakari. Skífan, 1998.
