= Jón Ásgeirsson =

Icelandic composer (1928–2025)

Jón Ásgeirsson (full name: Jón Gunnar Ásgeirsson, 11 October 1928 – 21 November 2025) was an Icelandic composer, teacher, and conductor. He is known for his songs and choral arrangements, many of which remain highly popular in Iceland.

== Career ==
Jón Ásgeirsson was born in Ísafjörður but later moved to Reykjavík and studied at the Reykjavík College of Music, where his teachers included Victor Urbancic and Jón Þórarinsson. He continued his education at the Royal Scottish Academy of Music in Glasgow, and at the Guildhall School of Music in London.

Upon returning to Iceland, he became a well-known composer and arranger, music educator, and conductor. In the 1960s, he conducted Liljukórinn, a chamber choir for which he made several arrangements that later became highly popular. He was the first music educator to be promoted to the rank of professor in Iceland. In 1996, he became a professor of music at the Icelandic Teacher's University.

His music is frequently inspired by Icelandic folk songs and folk poetry. Among works that use folk tunes are his Piano Quintet and the orchestral Lilja, based on an ancient tune. Original works in a folkloric style include his Fjórar stemmur (Four Verses) for choir, composed for the Hamrahlíð Choir in 1977. Another strain of works is written in a melodious, neo-classical vein, influenced partly by Paul Hindemith. Among these works is the substantial choral composition, Tíminn og vatnið for SATB choir.

Jón Ásgeirsson wrote the first full-length Icelandic opera, Þrymskviða (The Lay of Thrym), which was premiered at the Reykjavík Arts Festival in 1974, to positive reviews. He later wrote two additional operas: Galdra-Loftur (Loftur the Magician), premiered at the Reykjavík Arts Festival in 1996, and Möttuls saga. He also composed several concertos for various instruments, including cello, clarinet, and flute.

Jón's most popular works are songs derived from his incidental music to the play Hús skáldsins (National Theater of Iceland, 1982), based on a novel by Halldór Laxness. These include Maístjarnan (The May Star) and Hjá lygnri móðu (By a Calm Brook), which have been performed by various renowned artists, including Björk and the Choir of Clare College, Cambridge.

Jón Ásgeirsson received various honors and prizes for his work. In 1996, he was made Honorary Artist of the city of Reykjavík. In 2001, he was made a Commander of the Order of the Falcon by the president of Iceland, for his contribution to music in Iceland. He received an honorary doctorate from the Icelandic Teacher's University in 2008, and the Lifetime Achievement award at the 2019 Icelandic Music Awards. From 2020 until his death, he received an Honorary Artist Salary from the Icelandic Parliament.

== Selected works ==
- Fornir dansar (Ancient Dances) for orchestra, 1968.
- Sjöstrengjaljóð (Seven-String Poem) for string orchestra, 1968.
- Lilja (Lily) for orchestra, 1970.
- Þrymskviða (Lay of Thrym), opera, 1974.
- Tíminn og vatnið (Time and the Water, text: Steinn Steinarr), SATB choir, 1977.
- Fjórar stemmur (Four Verses) for SATB choir, 1977.
- Incidental music to Hús skáldsins (Halldór Laxness), including Maístjarnan and Hjá lygnri móðu, 1982.
- Þjóðvísa (Folk Verse) for orchestra, 1982.
- Concerto for Cello and Orchestra, 1983.
- Galdra-Loftur (Loftur the Magician), opera, 1995.
- Concerto for Clarinet and Orchestra, 1998.
- Wind Quintet no. 2, 1999.
- Flute Concerto, 2003.
- Möttuls saga, opera, 2008.

Arrangements:

- Vísur Vatnsenda-Rósu (Augun mín og augun þín)/The Verses of Vatnsenda-Rósa, SATB choir, ca. 1960.
- Gloria tibi, SATB choir, 1962.
- Sofðu, unga ástin mín (Sleep, my young love), SATB choir.

== Selected recordings ==
- Gloria tibi, Sofðu unga ástin mín, Vísur Vatnsenda-Rósu. On Íslensk þjóðlög/Icelandic Folk Songs. The Hamrahlíð Choir, cond. Þorgerður Ingólfsdóttir. Iceland Music Information Center, 1993.
- Sjöstrengjaljóð (also includes Piano Quintet, Wind Quintet). Reykjavík Chamber Orchestra. Smekkleysa, 2003.
- Tíminn og vatnið. Langholtskirkja Chamber Choir, cond. Jón Stefánsson. Iceland Music Information Center, 2008.
- Hjá lygnri móðu. Björk Guðmundsdóttir, Jónas Sen. RÚV 2013.
- Í gleðinni (Come and Be Joyful, from Four Verses). On Come and Be Joyful. The Hamrahlíð Choir, cond. Þorgerður Ingólfsdóttir. One Little Independent Records, 2020.
- Hjá lygnri móðu. On Ice Land: The Eternal Music. Choir of Clare College, Cambridge, cond. Graham Ross. Harmonia Mundi, 2022.
