= Ásgerður Júníusdóttir =

Icelandic singer

- Born: Ásgerður Júníusdóttir; 26 September 1968 (age 58); Reykjavík, Iceland
- Occupations: Singer mezzo-soprano performer
- Writing career
- Genres: Opera; Contemporary music
- Notable works: Minn heimur og þinn (2001); Í rökkri (2006); Langt fyrir utan ystu skóga (2011)

Ásgerður Júníusdóttir (born 26 September 1968) is an Icelandic mezzo-soprano and performer who has appeared on stage and released music in Iceland and abroad.

== Biography ==
Ásgerður Júníusdóttir, a mezzo-soprano, has appeared as a singer and actress in Iceland and abroad. In her career she has focused on 20th- and 21st-century Icelandic music and premiered works by contemporary composers, including Jórunn Viðar, Atli Heimir Sveinsson, Haukur Tómasson, Karólína Eiríksdóttir, and Ragnhildur Gísladóttir, as well as worked with different music ensembles such as the English Brodsky Quartet.

She has released three CDs on the Smekkleysa label. Her first two Minn heimur og þinn (Tapestry of dreams, 2001), which contains songs and poems by Icelandic women and Í rökkri (At Twilight, 2006), containing songs by Magnús Blöndal Jóhannsson, were both nominated for the Icelandic Music Award. Her latest CD, Langt fyrir utan ystu skóga (Far Beyond the Remotest Forests), with songs by Björk Guðmundsdóttir, Gunnar Reynir Sveinsson and Magnús Blöndal Jóhannsson was released in the summer of 2011.

Among the parts that Ásgerður has sung on stage are those of Carmen in Georges Bizet's opera of the same name at the Reykjavík City Theatre (2006), Magnus-Maria (2014) and Skuggaleikur (Play of Shadows, 2006) by Karólína Eiríksdóttir and Sjón, and Wide Slumber by Valgeir Sigurðsson (2014). She has also acted and sung in the mono-opera The Medium (2009) by sir Peter Maxwell Davies and appeared as actress in the theatre productions Common Nonsense (2004) and Ball of Yarn (2009).

In the summer of 2011 she took part in "Your Country Does Not Exist" by Libia Castro and Ólafur Ólafsson, Iceland's official Icelandic contribution to the Venice Biennale, performing a political statement on a gondola sailing Venice.

Ásgerður worked as Bill Skarsgård's vocal coach for his role as Count Orlok in the 2024 film Nosferatu.

== Works ==
=== Discography ===
- Minn heimur og þinn Songs and poems by Icelandic women ("Tapestry of Dreams", Smekkleysa, 2001)
- Í rökkri Songs by Magnús Blöndal Jóhannsson ("At Twilight", Smekkleysa, 2006)
- Langt fyrir utan ystu skóga Songs by Björk Guðmundsdóttir, Gunnar Reynir Sveinsson, Magnús Blöndal Jóhannsson ("Far Beyond the Remotest Forests", Smekkleysa, 2011)
- Séð frá tungli Songs by Jórunn Viðar, with arrangements and performances infused with the Jazz and Cabaret music the composer was influenced by during her years of study in Berlin and New York. ("See from the Moon, Smekkleysa, December 2023.)

=== Stage ===
- Common Nonsense, a play by John Wright and the troupe (Reykjavík City Theatre, 2003)
- Guðrúns 4th Song, an opera by Haukur Tómasson (Båstad Chamber Music Festival, 2005)
- Carmen, an opera by Georges Bizet (Reykjavik City Theatre, 2006)
- Madonna Furiosa, an opera by Bertil Palmar Johansen (The Nordic House, Reykjavík, 2006)
- Skuggaleikur, an opera by Karólína Eiríksdóttir (The Icelandic Opera, Reykjavík 2006)
- The Medium, an opera by Peter Maxwell Davies (The Reykjavík Arts Festival, Reykjavík 2009)
- Hnykill, a site specific play by Margrét Vilhjálmsdóttir and the troupe. (Norðurpóllinn, Reykjavík 2009)
- Lange Nacht der Opera an installation of three works at the Volksbühne (Berlin, 2011)
- Wide Slumber an opera by Valgeir Sigurðsson (The Reykjavík Arts Festival, Reykjavík 2014)
- Magnus Maria: An opera about the right gender, an opera by Karólína Eiríksdóttir (Mariehamn, 2014)

=== Contributions ===
- Svo á jörðu sem á himni, "As in Heaven" soundtrack by Hilmar Örn Hilmarsson to the film by Kristín Jóhannesdóttir.
- Glands, a song on the album "Hi-Camp meets Lo-fi" by Dip (Jóhann Jóhannsson & Sigtryggur Baldursson).
- Sense of Reason, a song on the album "In Cod We Trust" by Ghostigital (Einar Örn Benediktsson & Curver).
- Les mystères du Snæfellsjökull, the song "Aria" by Magnús Blöndal Jóhannsson features in the soundtrack of the documentary by Jean-Michel Roux.
- Litlu börnin leika sér and Kindur jarma í kofunum, two children songs on the album "Hvað á að gera?" by Margrét Örnólfsdóttir.
- Motorlab #2 A compilation from the Kitchen Motors events in Reykjavík. Ásgerður Júníusdóttir sings in excerpts from the chamber opera Kisa by Múm and Sjón.
