= Sigrún Eðvaldsdóttir =

Icelandic violinist

Sigrún Eðvaldsdóttir (born 13 January 1967) is an Icelandic violinist. She is concertmaster of the Iceland Symphony Orchestra and has performed widely as soloist and chamber musician, both in Iceland and abroad.

== Career ==
Sigrún began her violin studies at age 5 with Gígja Jóhannsdóttir, and later studied with Guðný Guðmundsdóttir at the Reykjavík College of Music, completing a soloist diploma in 1984. In 1988 she graduated with a Bachelor of Music from the Curtis Institute of Music, where Jamie Laredo was her teacher. She was a founding member of the Miami String Quartet from 1988–1990, and has frequently appeared as soloist at international festivals, including a performance of Leifur Þórarinsson's Violin Concerto with the BBC Scottish Symphony Orchestra in Glasgow in 1992. She was a guest concertmaster at the Royal Danish Opera Orchestra in Copenhagen in 2012–2013. In 1998, Sigrún was appointed First Concertmaster of the Iceland Symphony Orchestra.

Sigrún has appeared frequently as soloist with the Iceland Symphony Orchestra and has performed all the major violin concertos with the orchestra. In 2015, a double CD was released with live recordings of her performances of concertos by Johannes Brahms, Alban Berg, Jean Sibelius, and Antonín Dvorák. She has also premiered new concertos that have been written especially for her, such as Haukur Tómasson's Concerto for Violin and Chamber Orchestra in 1997, and the Violin Concerto by Áskell Másson in 2006. Her international appearances with the orchestra include Nottingham Royal Concert Hall and Usher Hall, both in 2023.

Sigrún has also performed widely as a chamber musician. In 2015, in collaboration with the pianist Gerrit Schuil, she performed all the violin sonatas of Ludwig van Beethoven at the Reykjavík Arts Festival.

== Prizes ==
Sigrún won second prize in the International Leopold Mozart Competition in 1987 (the first prize went to Isabelle Faust), third prize in the Sibelius Competition in 1990, and second prize in the Carl Flesch Competition in 1992. That same year, she won the Brøste Optimism Prize. In 1998, she was made a Commander of the Order of the Falcon, for her contribution to music in Iceland.

== Recordings ==
- Cantabile. With Selma Guðmundsdóttir, piano. Steinar, 1991.
- Ljúflingslög. With Selma Guðmundsdóttir, piano. Steinar, 1992.
- Árni Björnsson: Romances op. 6 and 14. On Icelandic Orchestral Music: Iceland Symphony Orchestra, cond. Petri Sakari. Chandos, 1993.
- Leifur Þórarinsson: Violin Concerto. Iceland Symphony Orchestra, cond. Paul Schuyler Phillips. Iceland Music Information Center, 2000.
- Olivier Messiaen: Quartet for the End of Time. With Einar Jóhannesson, Richard Talkowski, Folke Gräsbeck. ÓMI, 2001.
- Violin Concertos. With Iceland Symphony Orchestra, various conductors. Smekkleysa, 2015.
