= Heyr himna smiður =

12th century Icelandic psalm

- Icelandic hymn by Þorkell Sigurbjörnsson
- English: Hear, smith of the heavens
- Genre: Hymn
- Occasion: Funerals, general
- Written: 13th-century
- Text: Kolbeinn Tumason
- Language: Icelandic
- Meter: 5.5.5.5.5.5.5.5
- Composed: 20th-century

"Heyr himna smiður" (literally "Hear, smith of the heavens") is a medieval Icelandic hymn written by chieftain and poet Kolbeinn Tumason in the 13th-century. The music that accompanies the text was composed by Þorkell Sigurbjörnsson (1938–2013) in 1973. This was the first known musical setting of the hymn to become widely popular, although the Icelandic composer Sigvaldi Kaldalóns set the text in the early 20th century; today, Sigurbjörnsson’s setting is among the best-known Icelandic hymns overall. Sigurbjörnsson composed his setting at the request of Róbert Abraham Ottósson, a German emigré who was at the time the Music Director (söngmálastjóri) of the Icelandic Lutheran Church. Ottósson expressed his regret that no worthy musical setting existed of the text, and thus encouraged Sigurbjörnsson to try his hand at it. Sigurbjörnsson later described how the music had come to him all at once as he was driving back home from the meeting with Ottósson, on a snowy afternoon in Reykjavík in January 1973.

== Text and English translations ==
The original text is presented here with the medieval and 19th-century Icelandic versions. The third column features a rough, literal translation into English, while the fourth column is a looser translation regularized to a metrical pattern of 5.5.5.5.5.5.5.5 and stating all first-person pronouns in the singular.

Heyr himna smiðr
hvers skáldit biðr;
komi mjúk til mín
miskunnin þín.
Því heitk á þik
þú hefr skaptan mik;
ek em þrællinn þinn,
þú est dróttinn minn.

Goð, heitk á þik
at græðir mik;
minzk mildingr mín,
mest þurfum þín;
ryð þú rǫðla gramr,
ríklyndr ok framr,
hǫlds hverri sorg
ór hjarta borg.

Gæt, mildingr, mín
mest þurfum þín
helzt hverja stund
á hǫlða grund;
sett, meyjar mǫgr,
málsefni fǫgr,
ǫll es hjǫ́lp af þér
í hjarta mér.

Heyr, himna smiður,
hvers skáldið biður.
Komi mjúk til mín
miskunnin þín.
Því heit eg á þig,
þú hefur skaptan mig.
Ég er þrællinn þinn,
þú ert drottinn minn.

Guð, heit eg á þig,
að græðir mig.
Minnst, mildingur, mín,
mest þurfum þín.
Ryð þú, röðla gramur,
ríklyndur og framur,
hölds hverri sorg
úr hjartaborg.

Gæt, mildingur, mín,
mest þurfum þín,
helst hverja stund
á hölda grund.
Set, meyjar mögur,
málsefni fögur,
öll er hjálp af þér,
í hjarta mér.

Hear, smith of the heavens,
what the poet asks.
May softly come unto me
thy mercy.
So I call on thee,
for thou hast created me.
I am thy slave,
thou art my Lord.

God, I call on thee
to heal me.
Remember me, mild one,
Most we need thee.
Drive out, O king of suns,
generous and great,
human every sorrow
from the fortress of the heart.

Watch over me, mild one,
Most we need thee,
truly every moment
in the world of men.
send us, son of the virgin,
good causes,
all aid is from thee,
in my heart.

Hear, smith of heavens.
The poet seeketh.
In thy still small voice
Mayest thou show grace.
As I call on thee,
Thou my creator.
I am thy servant,
Thou art my true Lord.

God, I call on thee;
For thee to heal me.
Bid me, prince of peace,
Thou my supreme need.
Ever I need thee,
Generous and great,
O’er all human woe,
City of thy heart.

Guard me, my savior.
Ever I need thee,
Through ev’ry moment
In this world so wide.
Virgin–born, send me
Noble motives now.
Aid cometh from thee,
To my deepest heart.

== Notable recordings ==
Recordings featuring Sigurbjörnsson’s 20th-century setting:

- 1988, The Hamrahlíð Choir, cond. Þorgerður Ingólfsdóttir. Album: Kveðið í bjargi.
- 2008, Hallgrimskirkja Motet Choir. cond. Hörður Áskelsson. Album: Ljósið þitt lýsi mér: Icelandic Church Music.
- 2021, Voces8. Album: Infinity.
- 2022, Choir of Clare College, Cambridge, cond. Graham Ross. Album: Ice Land: The Eternal Music.

During the COVID-19 lockdown in March 2020, four horn players from the Iceland Symphony Orchestra performed an arrangement of Sigurbjörnsson’s setting in the lobby of Harpa Concert Hall in Reykjavík. The performance was posted on the orchestra’s YouTube channel.

== Notable singers ==
- Árstíðir
- Eivør Pálsdóttir
- Hamrahlíðarkórinn
- Ylja
- Voces8

== In popular culture ==
In September 2013, the hymn went viral thanks to an impromptu performance by Árstíðir, an Icelandic indie-folk group. As of 2025, the video, which is published on YouTube, has more than 8 million views.

In 2017, two episodes of the American dystopian television series The Handmaid's Tale featured the hymn. The version used was arranged and performed by Hildur Guðnadóttir from her 2014 album "Saman".
