= Rut Ingólfsdóttir =

Icelandic violinist

Rut Ingólfsdóttir (born 31 July 1945) is an Icelandic violinist and translator. She has appeared widely as soloist and chamber musician, and was the artistic director and concertmaster of the Reykjavík Chamber Orchestra for 42 years, from its founding in 1974 to 2016.

== Career ==
Rut began violin lessons at age five with Ruth Hermanns, continuing her studies at the Reykjavík College of Music with Einar G. Sveinbjörnsson (1959–62) and Björn Ólafsson (1964–65). She later studied with Sveinbjörnsson at the Malmö Conservatory, Sweden, in 1965–66, and with André Gertler at the Conservatoire Royale de Musique in Brussels, where she completed the Premier Prix de Violon in 1969.

Upon returning to Iceland, she won a position with the Iceland Symphony Orchestra, where she played from 1969–1975 and again from 1983–1988, including a 4-year stint as third concertmaster. She was among the founders of the Reykjavík Chamber Orchestra in 1974, leading the orchestra in various large projects, including collaborations and tours with Vladimir Ashkenazy, Paul Zukofsky, and Reinhard Goebel. She was also concertmaster in concerts with Pólýfónkórinn (The Polyphonic Choir), which was conducted by her father, Ingólfur Guðbrandsson, from 1969–1986.

Rut has frequently appeared as soloist with the Iceland Symphony Orchestra, and in 2019 a double CD of archival performances from the Iceland National Radio was released. She also frequently appeared as soloist with the Reykjavík Chamber Orchestra, and her CD of the Violin Concertos of J.S. Bach was issued in 2009. Among her many other CDs are performances of solo violin music by Icelandic composers (1998), Icelandic sonatas for piano and violin (2007), including works by Fjölnir Stefánsson and Jón Nordal, and sonatas by W.A. Mozart and César Franck (2011).

Rut has also translated several books from French into Icelandic, including Exercises in Style by Raymond Queneau (Stílæfingar, 2019), La Place (Staðurinn) and Le jeune homme (Ungi maðurinn) by Annie Ernaux, and Victor Hugo vient de mourir (Victor Hugo var að deyja) by Judith Perrignon.

== Awards and recognitions ==
Rut Ingólfsdóttir has been awarded various awards and recognitions for her work. In 1990, she was made Commander of the Order of the Falcon for her contribution to music in Iceland. In 2017, she was awarded the Honorary Lifetime Achievement Award at the Icelandic Music Awards. She also received various nominations for the Icelandic Music Awards, including as Performer of the Year in 2001.

== Personal life ==
Rut is married to Björn Bjarnason, former Minister of Education and Culture and Minister of Justice in Iceland. They have two children. Her older sister is the choral conductor Þorgerður Ingólfsdóttir.

== Selected recordings ==
- Icelandic Music for Solo Violin. Icelandic Music Information Center, 1998.
- The First Icelandic Violin Sonatas (Fyrstu íslensku sónöturnar). Smekkleysa, 2007.
- J.S. Bach: Violin Concertos. Smekkleysa, 2009.
- Sonatas by W.A. Mozart and César Franck. Smekkleysa, 2011.
- Rut Ingólfsdóttir and the Iceland Symphony Orchestra. Works by Hindemith, Bruch, Casella, et al. Smekkleysa, 2019.
