= Thráin =

Thráin can refer to:

- Thráin, a barrow-wight from the Norse legend Hrómundar saga Gripssonar
- Thráin I or Thráin the Old, founder of the Kingdom under the Mountain in Tolkien's Middle-earth
  - Thráin II, father of Thorin Oakenshield in Tolkien's Middle-earth

== People ==
"Thráin" is also a transliteration of the Icelandic name "Þráinn" (also rendered as "Thrainn" in some cases). This may refer to:

- Þráinn Bertelsson an Icelandic film director, writer, politician, journalist and newspaper editor
- Þráinn Hjálmarsson an Icelandic composer.
- Þráinn Orri Jónsson an Icelandic handball player
