= Leifur Þórarinsson =

Icelandic composer (1934-1998)

Leifur Þórarinsson (also written Thórarinsson, 13 August 1934 – 24 April 1998) was an Icelandic composer, violinist, music critic, and radio broadcaster. He was among the leading Icelandic composers of his generation and one of the first Icelandic composers to employ serial technique in his works.

== Biography ==
Leifur Þórarinsson was born in Reykjavík, the oldest of three children of Alda Möller, one of Iceland's leading actresses at the time, and her husband, Þórarinn Kristjánsson. The death of his mother in 1948, when he was only 14 years old, was a traumatic event for Leifur and his siblings. He studied music at the Reykjavík School of Music, where Jón Þórarinsson was among his teachers, and there Leifur learned the compositional technique commonly associated with Paul Hindemith. He studied in Vienna and Munich from 1954 to 1956, taking lessons with Hanns Jelinek, Karl Schiske, and Wilhelm Killmayer. His first international breakthrough came in 1956, when his Violin Sonata was selected for performance at the ISCM Festival in Stockholm -- a remarkable feat for a 22-year-old composer. After a few years in Iceland, he then continued his studies in New York, first with Wallingford Riegger, and after his unexpected death in 1961 with Gunther Schuller, who became a mentor and lifelong friend.

During Leifur's years in New York, his music gained attention and was performed in prominent venues. In December 1961, four of his works (Fagra veröld; Variations for piano; Mosaic; Points for Three/Afstæður) were performed at the Donnell Library on 53rd Street as part of the Composers' Forum concert series, and received a glowing review by Alan Rich of the New York Times, who declared Points for Three to be "tightly organized and full of interesting sounds." In February 1964, his Kadensar was performed under Schuller´s direction in Carnegie Hall, the first work by an Icelandic composer to be heard there. In summer 1964, two of Leifur's works (Kadensar and Óró) were performed at the Tanglewood Music Center.

Leifur returned to Iceland in 1966 and was active in many different fields, including as a music critic, radio broadcaster for the Iceland National Radio (Ríkisútvarpið), and teacher. Around 1970, he moved from the stricter serialism of his New York period to a more free atonal style, as exemplified in his String Quartet no. 2 and Violin Concerto. Later works, such as Angelus Domini, are in a personal style that sometimes suggests the influence of Stravinsky, including direct quotes (Symphony no. 2).

Leifur Þórarinsson was nominated for the Nordic Council Music Prize five times: in 1965 for his Symphony no. 1 (1963), in 1970 for his String Quartet (1969), in 1976 for Angelus Domini (1975), in 1982 for the cantata Rís upp, ó, Guð (1979), and in 1990 for STYR, notturno capricioso (1988).

Leifur Þórarinsson died of cancer in Reykjavík in 1998. His music continues to be performed and recorded, including by established ensembles such as the Iceland Symphony Orchestra, the Reykjavík Chamber Orchestra, and the Caput Ensemble (see Selected Recordings). In 2010, musicologist Árni Heimir Ingólfsson discussed his music in connection with other composers of his generation, and in 2014 Kolbeinn Bjarnason published a wide-ranging study of Leifur and his music.

== Selected works ==
- Barnalagaflokkur (Children's Pieces) for Piano (1954)
- Sonata for Violin and Piano (1956)
- Fagra veröld (Fair World, three songs to poems by Tómas Guðmundsson) for voice and piano (1957)
- Sonata for Piano (1957)
- Variations for Piano (1958)
- Afstæður (“Points for three") for violin, cello and piano (1960)
- Mósaík (Mosaic) for violin and piano (1961)
- Epitaph for orchestra -- Wallingford Riegger in memoriam (1961)
- Kadensar for harp, oboe, clarinet, bass clarinet and bassoon (1963)
- Symphony no. 1 (1963, rev. 1966)
- Óró for seven instruments (1964)
- Hornakórallinn, incidental music to a play by Oddur Björnsson (1966)
- Klasar (Clusters) for piano (1967)
- Strengjakvartett 1969 (String Quartet no. 2, 1969)
- Concerto for Violin and Orchestra (1969–70)
- Draumur um húsið (Dream About the House) for harp and strings (1972)
- Angelus Domini for mezzo-soprano and chamber ensemble (1975)
- Per voi for flute and piano (1975)
- Rent for strings (1976)
- Sumarmál for flute and harpsichord (1978)
- Sonata per Manuela for solo flute (1979)
- Da Fantasy (Da fantasía) for solo harpsichord (1979)
- Concerto for Oboe and Orchestra (1982)
- STYR, notturno capricioso for piano and orchestra (1988)
- Serena for violin and harp (1995)
- Symphony no. 2 (1997)

== Selected recordings ==
- Leifur Þórarinsson: Haustspil (on Four Icelandic Orchestral Works). Iceland Symphony Orchestra, cond. Petri Sakari. Iceland Music Information Center, 1989.
- Leifur Þórarinsson: Sonata per Manuela. To Manuela: Icelandic Solo Flute Music. Manuela Wiesler, flute. BIS, 1989.
- Leifur Þórarinsson: Portrait (includes String Quartet 1969, Styr, IÓ, Mót, För). Iceland Music Information Center, 1992.
- Leifur Þórarinsson: Sumarmál (includes music for flute and harpsichord). Kolbeinn Bjarnason, flute, Guðrún Óskarsdóttir, harpsichord. Smekkleysa, 1998.
- Leifur Þórarinsson: Barnalagaflokkur. Við slaghörpuna. Jónas Ingimundarson, piano. Fermata, 1995.
- Leifur Þórarinsson: Icelandic Chamber Music. Caput Ensemble. GM Recordings, 1999.
- För/Journey (Violin Concerto and Symphony no. 2). Sigrún Eðvaldsdóttir, Iceland Symphony Orchestra, cond. Petri Sakari and Paul Scheuyler Philips. Iceland Music Information Center, 1999.
- Leifur Þórarinsson: Leitin eilífa/The Eternal Quest (includes Á Kýpros, Rent, Draumur um húsið, Vor í hjarta mínu, Angelus Domini). Reykjavík Chamber Orchestra, cond. Bernharður Wilkinson. Smekkleysa, 2001.
- Leifur Þórarinsson: String Quartet no. 3. Langur skuggi/Long Shadow. Reykjavík Chamber Orchestra. Smekkleysa, 2016.
