= Karólína Eiríksdóttir =

Icelandic composer

Karólína Eiríksdóttir (born 10 January 1951) is an Icelandic composer.

== Biography ==
Karólína was born in Reykjavík, Iceland, and studied piano as a child. She later studied composition at the Reykjavik College of Music with Þorkell Sigurbjörnsson and at the University of Michigan in Ann Arbor with George Wilson, Leslie Bassett and William Albright. She graduated with a master's degrees in music history and research (1976) and in composition (1978), and took a teaching position at the College of Music in Reykjavík.

Karólína's works have been performed in France, England, Vienna, Tokyo, the United States, Germany, Switzerland, Spain and Argentina. She served as chairman of the board of The Iceland Music Information Centre and of The Society of Icelandic Composers, and was active on the boards of the Reykjavík Arts Festival and Iceland Academy of the Arts.

== Works ==
Karólína composes for orchestra, solo instruments, chamber ensembles, computer music and opera. Selected works include:

- Någon har jag sett, opera (text: Marie Louise Ramnefalk)
- Man Alive, opera (text: Árni Ibsen)
- Magnus Maria, chamber opera (text: Katarina Gäddnäs)
- Skuggaleikur, opera (text: Sjón)
- Three Paragraphs for orchestra
- Concerto for clarinet and orchestra
- Toccata for orchestra
- Guitar Concerto
- Concerto for two flutes and orchestra
- Na Carenza for mezzo-soprano, oboe and viola (1993)
- Strenglag (String Tune) for viola and piano (2002)

=== Discography ===
Karólína's works have been recorded and issued on CD, including:

- Karólína Eiríksdóttir - Portrait: Sinfonietta, In Vultu Solis, Trio, Rhapsody, Five Pieces for Chamber Orchestra, Ljóð námu land, Någon har jag sett. Iceland Music Information Center, 1991.
- Renku. New Chamber Music - Ymir Ensemble. Iceland Music Information Center, 1993.
- Spil: Heimkynni við sjó, Hvaðan kemur lognið; Skýin, Spil. Smekkleysa, 1999.
- Mánuðurinn mars (The Month of March). My world and yours - Ásgerður Júníusdóttir, mezzo-soprano. Smekkleysa, 2001.
- Winter, Ungæði. Iceland Spring Poem: Icelandic Choral Music. Hamrahlíð Choir, cond. Thorgerður Ingólfsdóttir. Smekkleysa, 2002.
- Vorvísa (Spring Poem) for harpsichord. Helga Ingólfsdóttir - From coast to distant shores. Smekkleysa, 2005.
- Six Poems from the Japanese. New Nordic Chamber Music, Warme-Quartet. Danacord, 2007.
- Enginn lái öðrum frekt. Granit Games. Tinna Thorsteinsdottir, piano. Smekkleysa, 2007.
- Steps for alto flute. Side by side: Icelandic Flute Music. Guðrún Birgisdóttir, flute. Iceland Music Information Center, 2008.
- Ungæði, Winter. Hear, My Soul: Choral Works by Icelandic Women Composers. Hymnodia, cond. Eyþór Ingi Jónsson. Iceland Music Information Center, 2008.
- Rhapsody in C. Nordia Ensemble, cond. Niklas Willen. Intim Musik, 2010.
- Eins konar rondó (Rondo of Sorts). Dance of the Bacchae: Piano Music from the Nordic Countries. Elisabeth Klein, piano. Classico, 2010.
- Brot. Reykjavík Chamber Orchestra, cond. Bernharður Wilkinson. Smekkleysa, 2016.
- Six Pieces for String Quartet. Reykjavík Chamber Orchestra. Smekkleysa, 2016.
