= Which Was the Son of ... =

2000 musical composition by Arvo Pärt

- Choral work by Arvo Pärt
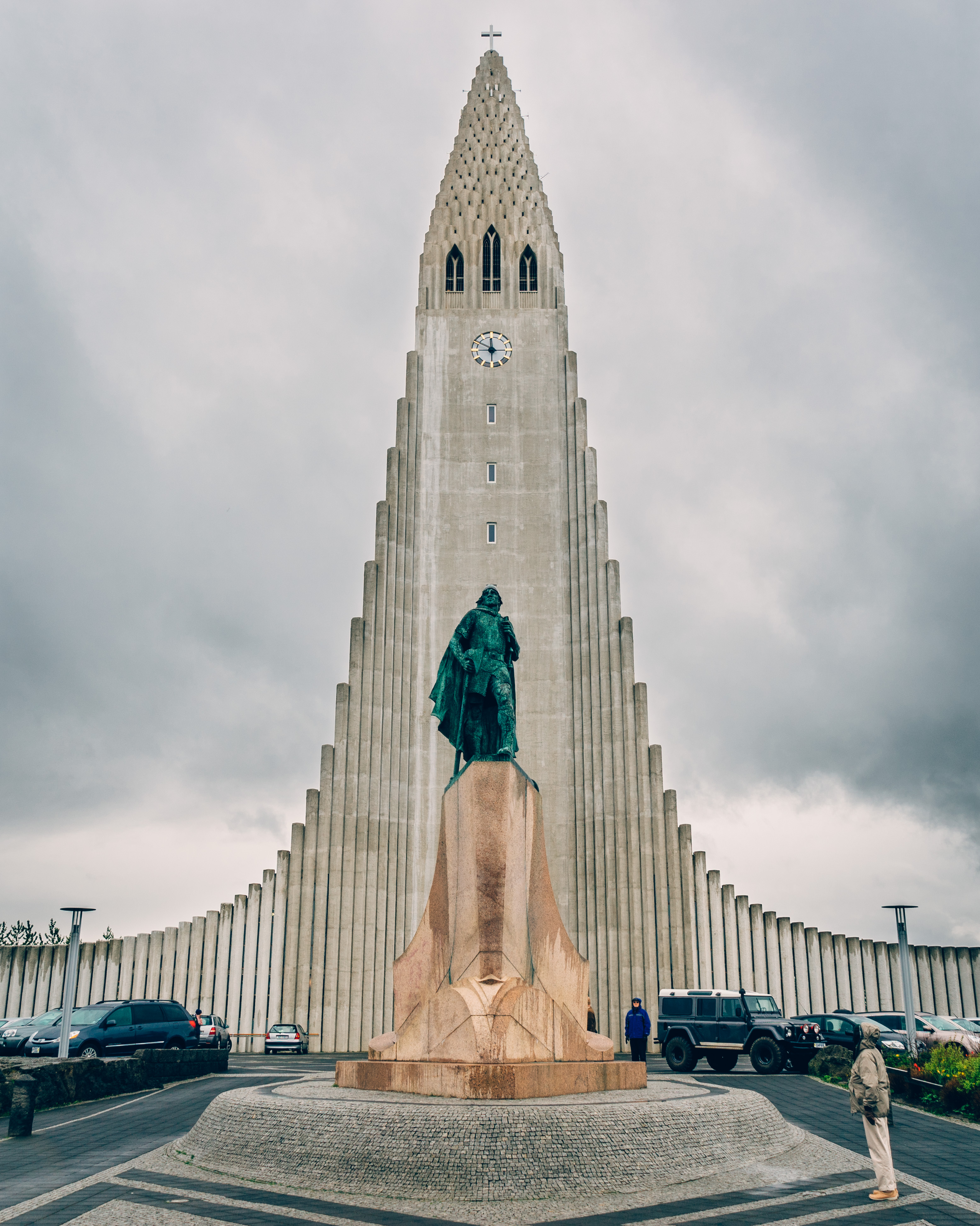
- Hallgrímskirkja, Reykjavík, where the work was first performed
- Text: from the Gospel of Luke
- Language: English
- Dedication: Þorgerður Ingólfsdóttir
- Performed: August 2000
- Published: 2000
- Scoring: SATB choir

Arvo Pärt's Which Was the Son of ... is a setting of the genealogy of Jesus from the Gospel of Luke, for mixed choir a cappella, written in 2000. It was published by Universal Edition.

== History ==
The work was commissioned by the city of Reykjavík for the Voices of Europe, a choir of young singers aged 18–23 from each of the European Capitals of Culture in the year 2000. Unusually, to celebrate the millennium, nine cities were selected: Avignon (France), Bergen (Norway), Bologna (Italy), Brussels (Belgium), Helsinki (Finland), Kraków (Poland), Prague (Czech Republic), Reykjavík (Iceland), and Santiago de Compostela (Spain). The choir project was led by the city of Reykjavík and its chief conductor was Þorgerður Ingólfsdóttir.

Arvo Pärt's first encounter with Iceland was in 1998, when he attended a performance given by the Hamrahlíð Choir and Reykjavík Chamber Orchestra of his Te Deum and other works in Reykjavík. This led to the Hamrahlíð Choir's conductor, Þorgerður Ingólfsdóttir, contacting Pärt about a possible commission for the Voices of Europe's tour of all the European Capitals of Culture in August 2000. English was chosen as the language of the composition, being Europe's actual lingua franca. The work was given its first performance in Hallgrímskirkja, Reykjavík, on 26 August 2000, conducted by Þorgerður Ingólfsdóttir, to whom the work is dedicated. Pärt's collaboration with the Voices of Europe was chronicled in the documentary film 24 Preludes for a Fugue by Dorian Supin.

== Text and music ==
Pärt's fascination with the Icelandic naming system, which uses patronymics (ending in -son for males), led him to select the genealogy of Jesus from the Gospel of Luke (3: 23–38) for the text. In addition, he gently pokes fun of the harsh rolled "r" of the Icelandic language by asking the choir to roll the r in the passage "which was the son of Er."

The work begins with an introduction ("And Jesus himself...") before launching into the genealogy proper. The main section of the piece is divided into several distinct sections, including a passage that can be described as a gently rocking lullaby ("which was the son of Simeon...") and a contemplative section for men's voices only ("which was the son of Jesse...") that has been likened both to barbershop singing and spirituals or gospel singing. Overall, Pärt has been said to avoid monotony by the variance in character of the different sections, and creating distinct climaxes along the way.

== Reception ==
Which Was the Son of ... has had a generally positive reception. Writing in Classics Today, Robert Levine noted that "the work’s charm–and wit (the closest Pärt comes to humor, I believe)–is a delight." Bernard Hughes writes that the work "has a lightness not always associated with Pärt", and David Fanning calls it a "presumably tongue-in-cheek" setting of the text. John Quinn has also praised it as a "highly original piece ... full of interest and variety."

== Selected recordings ==
- Estonian Philharmonic Chamber Choir, cond. Paul Hillier. On Baltic Voices 1. Harmonia Mundi, 2002.
- Polyphony, cond. Stephen Layton. On Triodion. Hyperion, 2003.
- The Tallis Scholars, cond. Peter Phillips. On Tintinnabuli. Gimell, 2015.
- Bavarian Radio Chorus, cond. Howard Arman. On Arvo Pärt: Miserere. BR-Klassik, 2021.
