= Gunnar Kvaran =

Icelandic cellist (born 1944)

- Born: January 16, 1944 (age 82); Seltjarnarnes, Iceland
- Genre: Classical
- Occupation: Cellist
- Instrument: Cello
- Spouse: Guðný Guðmundsdóttir

Gunnar Kvaran (born 16 January 1944) is an Icelandic cellist. He is considered one of Iceland's leading cellists and string pedagogues and has performed widely in Iceland and abroad.

== Life and career ==
Gunnar was born in the town of Seltjarnarnes near Reykjavík, the son of actor Ævar Kvaran and the great-grandson of Einar Hjörleifsson Kvaran. He began studying the cello with Einar Vigfússon at the age of twelve and went to Copenhagen in 1964 to study with the famous Danish-Icelandic cellist Erling Blöndal Bengtsson at the Royal Danish Academy of Music. Later on he studied with Reine Flachot in Paris and Basel.

Gunnar Kvaran has given concerts widely, including Wigmore Hall in London, Carnegie Hall in New York and Beethoven-Haus in Bonn. He has frequently appeared as soloist with the Iceland Symphony Orchestra.

In 1988, he established the Reykjavík Trio with Halldór Haraldsson and Guðný Guðmundsdóttir. He was its cellist for 30 years, until the Trio gave its final concert in 2018.

For 25 years, Gunnar Kvaran taught at the Reykjavík College of Music, where he headed the department of string instruments. He was also professor of stringed instruments and chamber music in the music department at the Iceland Academy of the Arts, where the Reykjavík Trio was the resident chamber music ensemble.

He is married to Guðný Guðmundsdóttir, former concertmaster of the Iceland Symphony Orchestra.

== Recordings ==
- J.S. Bach. Suites for solo cello. Japis, 1994.
- Works by Beethoven, Schubert, Jón Nordal, and Dmitri Shostakovich. With Gísli Magnússon, piano. Japis, 1995.
- Works by Beethoven, Jón Nordal, and Dvořák. With Tríó Reykjavíkur. Japis, 1999.
- Elegía (Elegy). Works by Tchaikovsky, Fauré, Schubert, and others. With Selma Guðmundsdóttir, piano. Sonet, 2004.
- Harpa og selló. With Elísabet Waage, harp. Sonet, 2004.
- Gunnar og Selma. Works by Frédéric Chopin, Mendelssohn, and Robert Schumann. With Selma Guðmundsdóttir, piano. Smekkleysa, 2004.
- Visions Fugitives. With Elísabet Waage, harp. Polarfonia, 2023.

== Awards ==
- Dr. Gunnar Thoroddsen Fund prize, 1990
- Icelandic Order of the Falcon, 2006
