= Guðný Guðmundsdóttir =

Icelandic violinist

Guðný Guðmundsdóttir (born 11 January 1948) is an Icelandic violinist and former concertmaster of the Iceland Symphony Orchestra. She has been one of Iceland's most prominent violinists, as well as a leading pedagogue in violin studies.

== Career ==
Guðný began her violin studies in Reykjavík, where she studied with Björn Ólafsson, then concertmaster of the Iceland Symphony, at the Reykjavík College of Music. She later studied at the Eastman School of Music, completing her undergraduate degree. After a year at the Royal College of Music in London, she returned to the United States, completing her master's degree at Juilliard.

In autumn 1974, aged 26, she won an audition to become the concertmaster of the Iceland Symphony Orchestra, becoming the second concertmaster in the orchestra's history, and the first woman. Until her retirement in 2010, she led the orchestra under many of the world's most renowned conductors and soloists, some of the latter including Luciano Pavarotti, Claudio Arrau, Itzhak Perlman, and Mstislav Rostropovich.

Guðný has performed widely as soloist, including dozens of performances with the Iceland Symphony. In 2010, a CD was released of some of her performances with the orchestra, including concertos by Elgar and Britten (both premieres in Iceland), as well as the Austrian-born local composers Herbert H. Ágústsson and Páll Pampichler Pálsson. As a chamber musician, she was a founding member of the Reykjavík Trio in 1988, performing with them both in Iceland and abroad during its 30-year existence.

As a pedagogue, Guðný taught for decades at the Reykjavík School of Music. With the founding of the Iceland University of the Arts in 2002, she led the violin department there for more than a decade. Among her students are most of Iceland's leading violinists, such as Sigrún Eðvaldsdóttir, Sibbi Bernharðsson, Sif Tulinius and Elfa Rún Kristinsdóttir.

Guðný has received various honors and recognitions for her work. In 1989, she was made Commander of the Order of the Falcon for her contribution to music. She received the DV Culture Prize in 1990. Her CD of Icelandic solo violin music was nominated for the Icelandic Music Awards in 2003.

== Selected recordings ==
- Karólína Eiríksdóttir: In vultu solis. On Karólína Eiríksdóttir: Portrait. Iceland Music Information Center, 1991.
- Edvard Grieg: Violin Sonatas. With Peter Maté, piano. Japis, 1994.
- Jónas Tómasson: Vetrartré (Winter Trees). On Jónas Tómasson: Portrait. Iceland Music Information Center, 1997.
- Piano trios by Beethoven, Dvořák, and Jón Nordal. Reykjavík Piano Trio, with Gunnar Kvaran and Peter Maté. Japis, 1999.
- Icelandic Works for Solo Violin. Polarfonia Classics, 2002.
- Guðný Guðmundsdóttir: Fiðlukonsertar. With Iceland Symphony Orchestra. Smekkleysa, 2010.
