= Battle of Víðines =

Icelandic battle, 1208

The Battle of Víðines (Icelandic: Víðinesbardagi) was a conflict that took place in 1208 between secular chieftains of the Icelandic commonwealth including Kolbeinn Tumason and the followers of the Catholic Church in early 13th-century Iceland.

== Background ==
The Catholic bishop Guðmundur Arason had defended the exclusive judicial powers of the Roman Catholic Church over its clergy against the secular powers of the goðar (chieftains). In 1208, Kolbeinn Tumason and Arnór Tumason of the Ásbirningar clan and Sigurður Ormsson of the Svínfellingar clan advanced on the see of Guðmundur Arason. They wanted the bishop to give up several men in his assembly with whom they claimed they had rightful business. The bishop stood by his claim that the clergy should retain judicial power in its own affairs, and a conflict ensued at Víðines, near Hólar, the seat of the bishop. Kolbeinn Tumason died in the battle, his head bashed in with a large rock, and the clan troops dissipated. Before he died, he composed the poem "Heyr, himna smiður" (Hear, heavenly creator"), which is a classic Icelandic hymn to this very day.
