= Kolbeinn Tumason =

Icelandic chieftain (1173–1208)

Kolbeinn Tumason (Old Norse: [ˈkolˌbɛinː ˈtumɑˌson]; Modern Icelandic: [ˈkʰɔlˌpeitn̥ ˈtʰʏːmaˌsɔːn]; 1173–1208) was a member of the Ásbirningar family clan, and was one of the most powerful chieftains in Iceland around the turn of the 13th century. Kolbeinn used his influenced the appointment of his allies into the clergy, such as Bishop Guðmundr Arason. However Guðmundr became a staunch defender of clerical independence, causing their relations to sour. In 1208, Kolbeinn and his followers attacked Guðmundr and his supporters in Hjaltadalur at the Battle of Víðines. Kolbeinn was killed in the battle due to head trauma.

== Kolbeinn the poet ==
Despite his opposition to Guðmundr, sources indicate that Kolbeinn was a devoutly religious man of some education. He is best known for composing the hymn Heyr himna smiðr (English: "Hear, Smith of heavens") after receiving his dying wound. It is now a classic and often-sung Icelandic hymn.
