= Music at World's End =

2025 book by Árni Heimir Ingólfsson

- Author: Árni Heimir Ingólfsson
- Language: English
- Genre: Music history
- Publisher: SUNY Press
- Publication date: 2025
- Publication place: United States
- ISBN: 979-8-8558-0069-2
- Website: SUNY Press

Music at World's End: Three Exiled Musicians from Nazi Germany and Austria and Their Contribution to Music in Iceland (2025) is a book by the Icelandic music historian Árni Heimir Ingólfsson. It tells the stories of three musicians who sought refuge in Iceland in the years leading up to World War II, and who made an invaluable contribution to the musical culture there.

The three musicians in question were Victor Urbancic, a conductor, pianist, and composer from Vienna; Heinz Edelstein, a cellist and music teacher from Freiburg im Breisgau, and Robert Abraham (who later took the Icelandic form of his name: Róbert Abraham Ottósson), a conductor and pianist from Berlin. As Ingólfsson points out in the book, they were all forced to leave their native countries soon after the Nazis came to power; Edelstein and Abraham were of Jewish heritage, as was Urbancic's wife, Melitta. They all attempted to obtain jobs elsewhere, but when these attempts failed, they were able to secure positions in Iceland. As Iceland was in the early stages of building a tradition of classical music, their expertise was needed there. They were all versatile musicians and were able and willing to contribute to the growing musical culture of their adopted home country.

In the book, Ingólfsson also discusses the xenophobic outlook of the Icelandic government at the time, under the leadership of Prime Minister Hermann Jónasson. In addition, he discusses how at least four other musicians applied for work permits in Iceland and were rejected, or considered applying for such permits: Alphons Silbermann, Ludwig Misch, Paul Erdensohn, and Viktor Ullmann.

Árni Heimir Ingólfsson first published short articles on Urbancic, Edelstein, and Abraham in 2001, at the request of the culture editor for the Icelandic newspaper Morgunblaðið, and they were published in three installments that year. He later expanded the article on Abraham for a publication to celebrate his centenary in 2012. The Icelandic version of his monograph was published in Iceland in September 2024, under the title Tónar útlaganna: Þrír landflótta tónlistarmenn sem mótuðu íslenskt menningarlíf (The Music of the Outlaws: Three Exiled Musicians Who Shaped Icelandic Cultural Life). This version received excellent reviews, including a five-star review in Morgunblaðið as well as praise from the critics of the TV book program Kiljan. One Icelandic scholar, Jón Karl Helgason, noted that Ingólfsson's research was particularly relevant, considering the strong controversy raging in Iceland on the local government's immigration policies. The book was nominated for the Icelandic Literary Prize (non-fiction), as well as for the Icelandic Hagthenkir Award for Best Scholarly Book.

The English-language edition was published in January 2025 and was featured soon afterwards on BBC Radio 3's program, Saturday Morning. In a review in Music and Letters, historian and record producer Michael Haas praised the book as "immensely readable and informative." In her review in Notes, Jane Gottlieb (Juilliard) called it a "fascinating study," packed with "enormous amount of information and keen insights." Kimberly Cannady also praised the book in a review in Scandinavian Studies, describing it as "exciting" and "meticulously researched." Writing for MusicWeb International, Dominic Hartley called the book "gripping and instructive," praising Ingólfsson's "formidable" and "scrupulous" research.
