= Jón Nordal =

Icelandic composer (1926–2024)

Jón Nordal (6 March 1926 – 5 December 2024) was an Icelandic composer and pianist. He was considered one of the leading Icelandic composers of his generation, and his orchestral and choral works have been widely performed.

== Career ==
Nordal was born in Reykjavík, the son of the prominent Icelandic philologist and author Sigurður Nordal and his wife Ólöf Jónsdóttir. He began music studies at a young age, and eventually began studying composition at the Reykjavík College of Music with Victor Urbancic and later with Jón Þórarinsson. He completed his studies there in 1949, with a Concerto for Orchestra that was premiered by the newly-established Iceland Symphony Orchestra in 1950.

He continued his studies in Zurich (1949–1951), where he studied with Willy Burkhard (composition) and Walter Frey (piano). He lived for a while in Copenhagen, where his father was the Icelandic ambassador at the time, but returned to Iceland in 1957. In 1959, he became the Dean of the Reykjavík College of Music, a position he held until 1992.

In his earlier years, Nordal appeared frequently as piano soloist, giving solo recitals and performing with the Iceland Symphony Orchestra. Among his early key works is a Sonata for Violin and Piano (1952) and a Piano Concerto (1956), which he premiered himself with the Iceland Symphony Orchestra.

Nordal attended the summer courses in composition in Darmstadt (known as Darmstädter Ferienkurse) in 1957, coming into contact with leading figures such as Karlheinz Stockhausen and Luigi Nono, but later acknowledged that he found it difficult to find his own voice as a modernist. His first large orchestral work after this was the "punctualist" score Brotaspil (Play of Fragments, 1962), which he essentially withdrew after one performance; it only received its second performance in 2026, at a concert celebrating Nordal's centenary. Only with the orchestral Adagio (1965) did he find his own voice with a frequently pensive, slow-moving, chordally based musical language.

After a series of orchestral works in the 1970s, culminating with Choralis (1982), premiered by Mstislav Rostropovich and the National Symphony Orchestra in Washington, D.C., Nordal turned his attention to choral and chamber works. Among his key works for choir from this period are Kveðið í bjargi (Invocation from the Rock, 1978) and Óttusöngvar á vori (Matins in Spring, 1993). Nordal largely retired from composing with the clarinet concerto Haustvísa (Autumn Verse) in 2000.

Jón Nordal received various honors and recognitions for his work. In 1978 he was made a Knight of the Order of the Falcon by the President of Iceland, and in 1993 he was awarded the Grand Cross of the same order. He received the Danish Order of the Dannebrog in 1956, and was elected member of the Royal Swedish Academy of Music in 1968. In 1999, Nordal was nominated for the Nordic Council's Music Prize for his string quartet Frá draumi til draums (From Dream to Dream). His music is published by the Icelandic Music Information Center.

== Selected compositions ==
- Smávinir fagrir for mixed choir (1940/1979)
- Systur í Garðshorni (The Sisters of Garðshorn) for violin and piano (1945)
- Concerto for Orchestra (1949)
- Sonata for violin and piano (1952)
- Bjarkamál, Sinfonietta Seriosa (1956)
- Concerto for Piano and Orchestra (1956)
- Adagio for flute, harp, piano, and strings (1965)
- Canto elegiaco for cello and orchestra (1971)
- Kveðið í bjargi for mixed choir (1978)
- Tvísöngur, concerto for violin, viola and orchestra (1979)
- Cello Concerto (1982)
- Choralis for orchestra (1982)
- Óttusöngvar á vori (Matins in Spring) for soprano, countertenor, cello, percussion, organ, and mixed choir (1993)
- Myndir á þili (Pictures on a Panel Wall) for cello and piano (1994)
- Requiem for mixed choir (Introitus only; 1995)
- Haustvísa (Autumn Verse), concerto for clarinet and orchestra (2000)

== Selected recordings ==
- Kveðið í bjargi; Umhverfi; Heilræðavísa; Smávinir fagrir. The Hamrahlíð Choir, cond. Þorgerður Ingólfsdóttir. Iceland Music Information Center, 1988.
- Cello Concerto. Erling Blöndal Bengtsson, Iceland Symphony Orchestra, cond. Petri Sakari. Iceland Music Information Center, 1989.
- Jón Nordal: Portrait (Orchestral works). Reykjavík Chamber Orchestra, cond. Paul Zukofsky. Iceland Music Information Center, 1991.
- Sól ég sá: Choral works. Hallgrímskirkja Motet Choir, cond. Hörður Áskelsson. Iceland Music Information Center, 1997.
- Lux Mundi: Choral Works. Hljómeyki, cond. Bernharður Wilkinson. Smekkleysa, 2004.
- Frá draumi til draums. On: Icelandic String Quartets. Eþos String Quartet. Smekkleysa, 2009.
- Orchestral works. Iceland Symphony Orchestra, cond. Johannes Gustavsson. Ondine, 2016.
- Organ works. Guðný Einarsdóttir, organ. Skálholtsútgáfan, 2024.

== Bibliography ==
- Bjarki Sveinbjörnsson. Tónlist Jóns Nordal og þróun tónlistarmála á 6. áratugnum og fyrri hluta 7. áratugarins (The Music of Jón Nordal and the Development of Music in Iceland in the 1950s and early 1960s). MA-thesis, Aalborg University, 1993.
- Kristín Jónína Taylor. Northern Lights: Indigenous Icelandic Aspects of Jón Nordal's Piano Concerto. D.M.A. thesis, University of Cincinnati, 2006.
