= Kjartan Ólafsson (composer) =

Icelandic musicologist (born 1958)

- Born: 18 November 1958 (age 67)
- Occupations: Musicologist, composer and academic
- Formerly of: Smartbandið

Kjartan Ólafsson (born 18 November 1958) is an Icelandic musicologist, composer and academic. He is the creator of the composing software CALMUS and has worked on the use of artificial intelligence in classical music composition.

== Life and education ==
A native of Reykjavík, Kjartan Ólafsson spent from 1976 to 1989 studying music, composition and natural sciences at the Music College of Kópavogur, Hamrahliðar College, Reykjavík College of Music, Utrecht Conservatory and Sibelius Academy. He was a member of the short-lived band Smartbandið from 1985 to 1986 where he wrote the song Lalíf that topped the Icelandic charts for several weeks in 1986.

In 1985, he received an award in the Icelandic Radio Competition for young composers and, in the near-quarter-century since, has been lecturing and holding seminars at such venues as the University of Iceland (1990), Reykjavík College of Music (1991–93), Sibelius Academy (1992), Finland's Avanti Summer Festival in Porvoo and Denmark's International Computer Music Conference in Aarhus (both 1994). In 2000, in connection with Reykjavík's status as the millennial and century year's European Culture City, he served as director of Icelandic Music in 100 Years, which became the largest festival of the country's music held up to that moment. In 2002, he traveled to the United States to lecture at New York University regarding use of CALMUS for algorithmic composing, a subject he updated with lectures at the 2008 Salzburg Mozarteum. Having taught music in the early 1990s at the Reykjavik College of Music, Kjartan has held, since 2005, the position of Professor of Composition and Theory at Iceland Academy of the Arts.

== Selected works ==
- Dimma (Dusk) for viola and piano (1985)
- Lalíf (1985)
- Concerto for viola and orchestra (1995)
