= Peter Bruun =

Danish composer

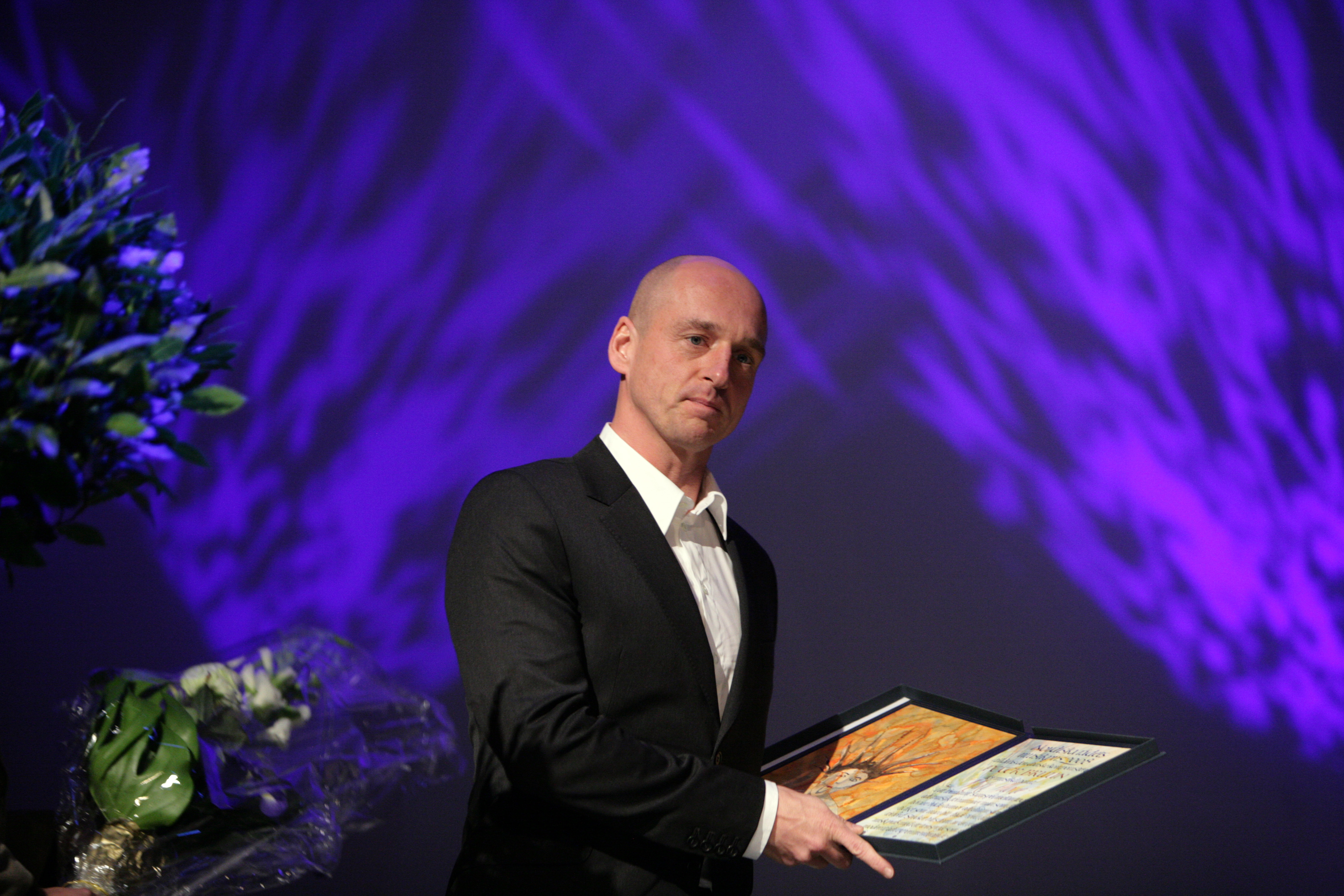

Peter Bruun (born 1968) is a Danish composer. He is a native of Aarhus, and studied philosophy at Aarhus University before turning to composition.

He won the Nordic Council Music Prize in 2008 for his composition Miki Alone.
