= Lalíf =

Song by Smartbandið

from the album Smartband
- Recorded: 1985
- Genre: Pop
- Length: 3:18
- Label: Smart-art
- Songwriter: Kjartan Ólafsson

Music video
- "Lalíf" on YouTube

"Lalíf", also known as "La-líf", is a song by the Icelandic pop band Smartbandið. It was composed by Kjartan Ólafsson for the band's 1985 album Smartband. After poor sales, the song became a hit in 1986, topping the Icelandic charts for several weeks. The song is known for being sung backwards.

In 2022, the song was featured in the Icelandic drama television mini-series Blackport.

== Music video ==
A music video for the song was recorded in Netherlands and was directed by Sigrún Harðardóttir.
