= Oliver Kentish =

British musician

Oliver John Kentish (born 1954) is a British-born cellist, tutor, and composer, who has lived in Reykjavík, Iceland, since 1977, and was granted Icelandic nationality in 1989. Kentish composes orchestral, choral, vocal, and chamber music. He was born in London.

In addition to composition, Kentish has been the Artistic Director of the Iceland Amateur Symphony Orchestra (Sinfóníuhljómsveit áhugamanna) since 2005.

Kentish was commissioned by the British Government in 1993 to write the work Mitt Folk which was performed by the Iceland Symphony Orchestra and is dedicated to Vigdís Finnbogadóttir. The work commemorates the 50th anniversary of Iceland as a republic and was a gift from Britain to Iceland.

Much of Kentish's current work (2008) is for the countertenor Sverrir Guðjónsson.

His work Prelude and Fugue for 10 violas was premiered in the United Kingdom at the Purcell Room in London on 30 November 2008.

== Selected works ==
- Jakobslag, Little Duet for viola and marimba (1999)
- Draumar og dansar (Dreams and Dances) for viola and chamber orchestra (2002)
- Prelúdía og fúga (Prelude and Fugue) for 10 violas (2005)
- Kvinnan fróma for viola and piano (2008)

== See also ==
- List of Icelandic composers
