= Páll Ragnar Pálsson =

Icelandic composer

- Born: July 25, 1977 (age 49); Reykjavík, Iceland
- Education: Estonian Academy of Music and Theatre Iceland Academy of the Arts
- Website: www.pallragnarpalsson.com

Páll Ragnar Pálsson (born July 25, 1977) is an Icelandic composer.

== Studies ==
During 1993 to 2004 he was a guitarist in Maus, an Icelandic progressive indie rock band, but took a decisive move towards contemporary classical music in 2004, entering the composition department of Iceland Academy of the Arts (LHÍ). In addition to a graduation chamber piece Pálsson wrote his BA thesis on Estonian composer Arvo Pärt about whom he has later given lectures and radio programs. Páll continued his studies in 2007 at the Estonian Academy of Music and Theatre, under Helena Tulve, a composer with distinctive musical aesthetics. There he obtained a master's degree in 2009 and a PhD in 2014.

In 2013 Pálsson moved back to Iceland, but maintained a close contact with Estonia. He adopted his teacher's intuitive method of composing. Supremacy of Peace for string orchestra represented Estonia at the International Rostrum of Composers in Prague in 2013 and The ISCM World Music Days in Ljubljana.

== Professional career ==
Since returning to Iceland, Pálsson's music frequently depicts movements in nature paralleled to similar processes within human psyche, particularly present in Quake, a piece for solo cello and chamber orchestra. The piece is a Los Angeles Philharmonic and the NDR Elbphilharmonie Orchestra co-commission for Sæunn Þorsteinsdóttir as a soloist. Its premiere was in the Elbphilharmonie, conducted by Jonathan Stockhammer, and then in the Walt Disney Hall in Los Angeles by the LA Phil New Music Group at the Reykjavík Festival, conducted by Daníel Bjarnason.

Pálsson orchestrated two songs by Icelandic band Sigur Rós, Takk... and Glósóli, for the Reykjavík Festival in Los Angeles, April 2017, where Esa-Pekka Salonen conducted Sigur Rós and The LA Philharmonic Orchestra three consecutive evenings.

For the opening ceremony of CYCLE Music and Art Festival in Kópavogur, August 2015, Pálsson built his string orchestra piece Spiegeltunnel on a mirror sculpture of the same title by Ólafur Elíasson ("a conceptual Danish-Icelandic artist concerned with sensorial experience and perception"). Pálsson's 6-part cycle for a string quartet and soprano, Nature Poems, builds upon the surrealist poetry of Sjón, "a mainstay in Icelandic culture". The piece was performed at Nordic Music Days in Reykjavík, October 2011.

In June 2017, Pálsson released his first composer album Nostalgia. The title piece, written for violinist Una Sveinbjarnardóttir and the Iceland Symphony Orchestra conducted by Ilan Volkov, was premiered at the Dark Music Days festival in 2013. The album was released by Smekkleysa, or Bad Taste.

== Awards ==
Quake for cello and orchestra was selected as the most outstanding work at the International Rostrum of Composers in Budapest 2018.

Pálsson received a grant from the memorial fund of Kristján Eldjárn in 2018.

Nostalgia was selected as composition of the year at the Icelandic Music Awards 2014.
