= Þráinn Hjálmarsson =

Icelandic composer

- Also known as: Thrainn Hjalmarsson
- Born: 1987 (age 38–39); Iceland
- Genres: Contemporary classical
- Occupation: Composer
- Years active: 2009–present
- Member of: S.L.Á.T.U.R

Þráinn Hjálmarsson (Thrainn Hjalmarsson, born 1987) is an Icelandic composer.

Þráinn earned a bachelor's degree from the Iceland Academy of the Arts in 2009 and a master's degree in composition from the Royal Conservatory of The Hague in 2011. He is a member of the Icelandic composers' collective S.L.Á.T.U.R (Society of artistically obtrusive composers around Reykjavík).

The BBC Scottish Symphony Orchestra under Ilan Volkov performed his As Heard Across a Room as part of a concert of new Icelandic works in 2014; critics described it as "finespun" and "paradox music: like trying to make out the structure of a void". His Lucid/Opaque (for string trio) was premiered by Nordic Affect at the annual Dark Music Days festival in 2016; a critic described it as "contain[ing] beautiful meditative stillness". Influence of buildings on musical tone for a chamber ensemble represented Iceland at the International Rostrum of Composers in Helsinki in 2014.
