= Róbert Abraham Ottósson =

Icelandic conductor (1912–1974)

Róbert Abraham Ottósson (born Robert Abraham; 12 May 1912 – 10 March 1974) was a German and Icelandic conductor, musicologist, and pianist. Born in Germany, he emigrated to Iceland in 1935. He is considered one of the most influential musicians in mid-20th-century Iceland.

== Biography ==
Ottósson was born was born in Berlin to a German-Jewish family, him being the son of the noted ethnomusicologist Otto Abraham and his wife, Lise Golm. Abraham received a thorough musical upbringing, studying piano and theory at the Klindworth-Scharwenka Conservatory, and eventually studying composition and conducting at the Berlin Academy of Music. Although Abraham was raised in the Protestant faith, his parents were both of Jewish heritage, and he left Germany in 1934.

He initially went to Paris, where he attended a conducting course led by Hermann Scherchen. Thereafter he continued to Copenhagen, where he hoped to receive a work permit. He failed to obtain it, despite help from friends and colleagues, including the academic Lis Jacobsen. Consequently Ottósson sailed to Iceland in late 1935, where he would live and work until his death.

Ottósson was advised to start a career in the town of Akureyri, where he would be attract less scrutiny from police and politicians. Iceland had a strict anti-immigration policy in the years leading up to World War II. Most refugees from Nazi Germany were denied asylum; Ottósson was allowed to stay. He founded his own choir in Akureyri. Opposition from locals, particularly from the composer and conductor Björgvin Guðmundsson, led Ottósson to move to Reykjavík in 1940. There, he worked as a conductor, pianist, and teacher. Among the ensembles he conducted was the National Radio Choir (1948-1950). He also conducted the first performance of the Iceland Symphony Orchestra in March 1950. In 1959, he became the first conductor of the Philharmonia Choral Society (Söngsveitin Fílharmónía). With them he conducted the Icelandic premieres of many key works, including Beethoven's Symphony No. 9 and Missa solemnis, Igor Stravinsky's Symphony of Psalms, Carl Orff's Carmina Burana, Verdi's Requiem, and Brahms' A German Requiem.

Ottósson also became a leading musicologist; he defended his doctoral dissertation on the Icelandic rhymed office (Reimoffizium) of Saint Thorlak (known in Icelandic as Þorlákstíðir) at the University of Iceland in 1959. This was published in the renowned scholarly series Bibliotheca Arnamagnæana. He would later contribute articles on Icelandic music to several leading international publications, including Kulturhistorisk Leksikon for Nordisk Middelalder and The New Grove Dictionary of Music and Musicians, thus making a substantial contribution to musicology in Iceland. Also, from 1959, he was director of music for the Church of Iceland. He took the Icelandic form of his name, Róbert Abraham Ottósson, after receiving Icelandic citizenship in 1949. He married Guðríður Magnúsdóttir in 1942, and they had one son, Grétar Ottó.

Ottósson also composed and arranged works, especially for local choirs. His arrangements include "Vinaspegill (Forðum tíð einn brjótur brands)" and "Björt mey og hrein", which have been frequently performed by local choirs, including the Iceland University Choir and the Hamrahlíð Choir. Original compositions include Miskunnarbæn (Icelandic Kyrie) and Svarkurinn, the latter to a poem by the Icelandic writer Grímur Thomsen. His works are published by the Icelandic Music Information Center.

Ottósson received several prestigious awards for his work on behalf of Icelandic music. In 1970, for his outstanding work on behalf of music he was made a knight of the Order of the Falcon by the president of Iceland. That year, he was also awarded the "Student Star," an award presented to an outstanding faculty member of the University of Iceland.

Ottósson died of a heart attack in Lund, Sweden on 10 March 1974, while attending a Nordic hymnology conference. His life and career have been the subject of a radio documentary by the German Deutschlandfunk Kultur (2020), and a biography of Ottósson and other exiled musicians, Music at World's End, by the Icelandic musicologist Árni Heimir Ingólfsson, was published in 2024 to positive reviews.
