= Þráinn Orri Jónsson =

Icelandic handball player (born 1993)

Personal information
- Nationality: Icelandic
- Born: 12 July 1993 (age 33) Reykjavík, Iceland
- Height: 2.04 m (6 ft 8 in)

Sport
- Sport: Handball
- Position: Pivot
- Current club: Bjerringbro-Silkeborg
- Number: 55

Youth career
- Years: Team
- 1999–2011: Grótta

Senior clubs
- Years: Team
- 2011–2017: Grótta
- 2017–2019: Elverum Håndball
- 2019–2020: Bjerringbro-Silkeborg
- 2020–: Haukar Handball
National team
Years	Team	Apps	(Gls)
2021–	Iceland	2	(2)

Þráinn Orri Jónsson (transliterated as Thrainn; born 12 July 1993) is an Icelandic professional handball player who plays for the Úrvalsdeild club Haukar and previously the Norwegian Eliteserien club Elverum and Danish Handball League club Bjerringbro-Silkeborg.

== Early life ==
While growing up in his hometown of Seltjarnarnes Þráinn was constantly involved in youth work and youth related extra curricular activities. He was the president of the student council at the age of 15 in his last year of Primary school. The Town council of Seltjarnarnes awarded Þráinn Orri for his work with the town youth in 2009. Þráinn was a handball coach at Grótta's youth academy, where he coached youth of all ages. Þráinn coached at Grótta until the day he transferred to Elverum.

== Club career ==
Þráinn Orri started his handball career with the Icelandic club Grótta in Seltjarnarnes at the age of 6. He played the position of right back for most of his younger years but had better success as a pivot with the Icelandic U21 national handball team and has since then played as a pivot.

=== Elverum Håndball ===
In 2017 Þráinn made a move to join Elverum, the reigning league champions of Norway. At Elverum Þráinn competed in the EHF Champions League and won multiple titles, including the league title, the playoffs and the league cup.

=== Bjerringbro-Silkeborg ===
In June 2019 it was announced that Þráinn Orri would be leaving Elverum to join former Danish champions Bjerringbro-Silkeborg before the start of the season.

=== Haukar Handball ===
Before the 2020–2021 season, Þráinn signed a contract with Icelandic powerhouse Haukar in Úrvalsdeild karla. Haukar finished the 2021 season on top of the league, but eventually lost the finals to their rivals Valur

== International career ==
Þráinn represented Iceland at the 2022 European Men's Handball Championship. He was called up while the tournament was ongoing due to the team suffering loss of players because of COVID-19. Þráinn received very positive criticism for his performance at Euro 2022, having surprised fans with his unexpected call up.
