= Björgvin Guðmundsson =

Icelandic composer (1891–1961)

Björgvin Guðmundsson (16 April 1891 – 4 January 1961) was an Icelandic composer. He was born at Rjúpnafell, Vopnafjörður, Iceland, where he grew up. In Vopnafjörður he showed inclination for music, and in his twenties Björgvin moved with his family to the Icelandic colonies in Canada, where he stayed until 1926. In 1923 Björgvin married Hólmfríður Frímann, a Canadian-born woman of Icelandic descent. During this period Björgvin composed the oratorios Strengleikar (English: Stringed Instruments) and Friður á jörðu (English: Peace on Earth), in addition to the cantata Adveniat regnum tuum. The cantata was performed in Winnipeg, Manitoba in the fall of 1925, after which the Icelandic Canadian population organized to support Björgvin to study musicology in London.

Björgvin studied at London's Royal College of Music for two years. During that time, Icelandic poet Stephan G. Stephansson sent him his work Þiðrandakviða, to which Björgvin composed one of his greatest works, the oratorio Örlagagátan (English: Riddle of Fate). Björgvin moved back to Winnipeg, where he completed his last major composition in 1929, Íslands þúsund ár (English: Iceland's Thousand Years), a cantata to Davíð Stefánsson's Alþingishátíðarljóð. At this time, Björgvin was offered teaching positions in his native Iceland, at both Akureyri Junior College and Akureyri's primary school.

In 1931, Björgvin moved back to Iceland to teach singing in Akureyri. He held his position at Akureyri Junior College until 1957, when he resigned for health reasons. In Akureyri Björgvin composed numerous songs and minor musical works. He founded a cantata choir, which performed many of his works. According to the Icelandic musicologist Árni Heimir Ingólfsson, Björgvin was fiercely competitive and jealous of other choral conductors working in Akureyri, not least Róbert Abraham (Ottósson), a Jewish-born musician from Berlin who moved to Iceland in 1935.

Back in Iceland, Björgvin started writing. He wrote articles for journals, the play Skrúðsbóndinn from an Icelandic fairy tale, and his memoirs. Many of his literary works have never been published. He died in 1961, and was buried in Akureyri. A bust of Björgvin can be found in Akureyri Junior College. A biography, Ferill til frama by Haukur Ágústsson (in Icelandic) was published in 2011.
