= Þorkell Sigurbjörnsson =

Icelandic composer (1938–2013)

Þorkell Sigurbjörnsson (or Thorkell Sigurbjörnsson) (16 July 1938 – 30 January 2013) was an Icelandic composer, conductor and pianist. The most prolific Icelandic composer, he is author of more than 350 works, from songs for children to orchestral works.

== Early life and study ==
Born in Reykjavík, the son of bishop Sigurbjörn Einarsson and his wife, Magnea Þorkelsdóttir, he graduated from Reykjavík High School in 1957. He then moved to the United States to study at Hamline University in Minnesota, ultimately graduating in 1961 from the University of Illinois at Urbana–Champaign. Among his teachers there were Lejaren Hiller and Kenneth Gaburo. He returned to Iceland in 1962, and hosted a regular radio show on RÚV for many years.

== Career ==
Þorkell taught piano, musicology, and music history at the Reykjavík College of Music for many years. He was also chair of the Icelandic Composers' Society from 1983 to 1987, sat for a time on the board of the Association of Icelandic Musicians and was president of the Association of Icelandic Artists from 1982 to 1986. He died in Kópavogur. He is best known for composing music (in 1973) for the 13th-century Icelandic hymn, Heyr, himna smiður.

While Þorkell's earliest works exhibit the influence of serialism and atonality, his music from around 1970 onwards is characterized by a style that might be called "moderate modernism". He frequently uses ostinato patterns and his music is often grounded in modality. Also, his works frequently exhibit his interest in Icelandic folk song and music history, for example Hans Variations for piano (1979, based on a seventeenth-century tune from the Melódía manuscript) and Recessional for choir (1981), the text of which comes from the Icelandic plainchant office for Saint Thorlak. Some of his other works employ extended performance techniques, such as Kalaïs for solo flute (1976), which was written for the Canadian flautist Robert Aitken and remains one of Þorkell's most performed instrumental works. He also wrote much sacred music, including hymns, Te Deum (1973), Missa Brevis (1992), as well as a large-scale oratorio, Immanúel (1999).

Þorkell was also an accomplished pianist. He frequently performed his own works, including Duttlungar (Caprice) for piano and orchestra with the Iceland Symphony Orchestra in 1968. He also played chamber music with renowned soloists, such as Paul Zukofsky, and was a member of the I.C.E. (Icelandic-Canadian Ensemble), whose other members were flautist Robert Aitken and cellist Hafliði Hallgrímsson. In 1977, he gave the Icelandic premiere of Olivier Messiaen's Quartet for the End of Time with members of the Reykjavík Chamber Orchestra.

== Awards ==
In 1993, Þorkell was awarded the Knight's Cross of the Icelandic Order of the Falcon for his contributions to the field of music. On 16 May 1995 he was named a member of the Royal Swedish Academy of Music.

== Selected works ==
- Gerviblómið (Chamber opera in three scenes, 1964)
- Apaspil (Children's opera, 1966)
- String Quartet, Hässelby (1968)
- KISUM for clarinet, viola, and piano (1970)
- Der wohltemperierte Pianist (1971)
- Mistur for orchestra (1972)
- Mild und (meistens) leise for solo cello (1973)
- Heyr, himna smiður for mixed choir (1973)
- Kalaïs for solo flute (1976)
- Hans Variations for solo piano (1979)
- Euridice for flute and orchestra (1979)
- Recessional for mixed choir (1981)
- Columbine for flute and orchestra (1982)
- Immanúel, oratorio for soloists, choir, and orchestra (1999)

== Selected recordings ==
- Þorkell Sigurbjörnsson: Portrait. Iceland Music Information Center, 1991.
- Liongate: Flute Concertos. Manuela Wiesler, Southern Jutland Symphony Orchestra, cond. Tamás Vető. BIS Records, 1995.
- Koma: Sacred Choral Works. Hljómeyki, cond. Þorkell Sigurbjörnsson. Iceland Music Information Center, 1996.
- KISUM and Three String Quartets. Iceland Music Information Center, 1999.
- Orchestral Works. Iceland Symphony Orchestra, cond. Vladimir Ashkenazy. Octavia Records, 2003.
- Þorkell: Music for Choir. The Hamrahlíð Choir, cond. Þorgerður Ingólfsdóttir. Smekkleysa, 2008.
- The Well-Tempered Pianist: Music for Solo Piano. Kristín Jónína Taylor. Iceland Music Information Center, 2010.
- Short Stories: Music for Flute and Piano. Jonathan Borja, Kristín Jónína Taylor. Smekkleysa, 2015.
- Að vornóttum: Music for Violin and Piano. Sibbi Bernhardsson, Anna Guðný Guðmundsdóttir. Smekkleysa, 2018.
- Heyr, himna smiður (on album Infinity). Voces8, Decca Classics, 2021.
- Heyr, himna smiður (on album Ice Land: The Eternal Music). Choir of Clare College, Cambridge, cond. Graham Ross. Harmonia Mundi, 2022.
