= Nordic Council Music Prize =

Music award

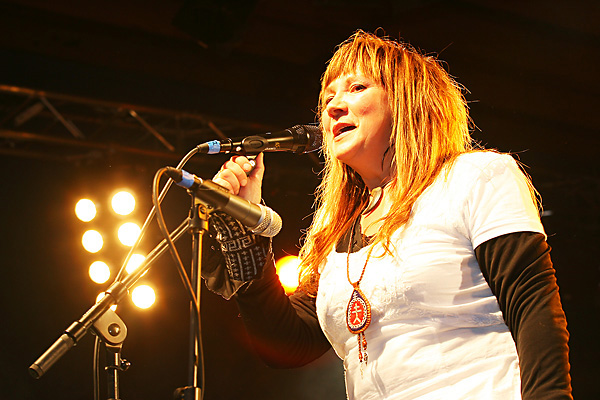
Mari Boine, 2003

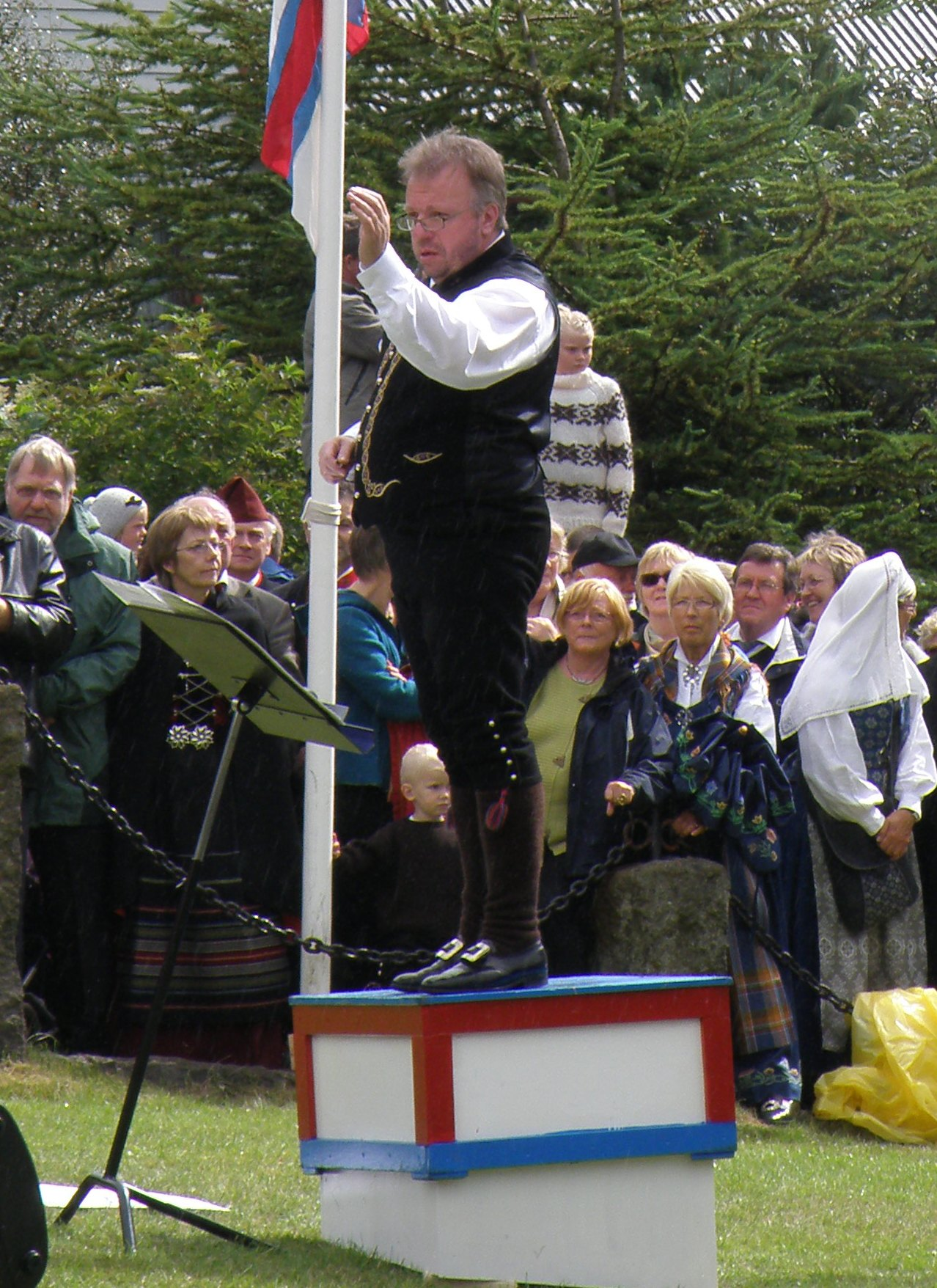
Sunleif Rasmussen, 2002

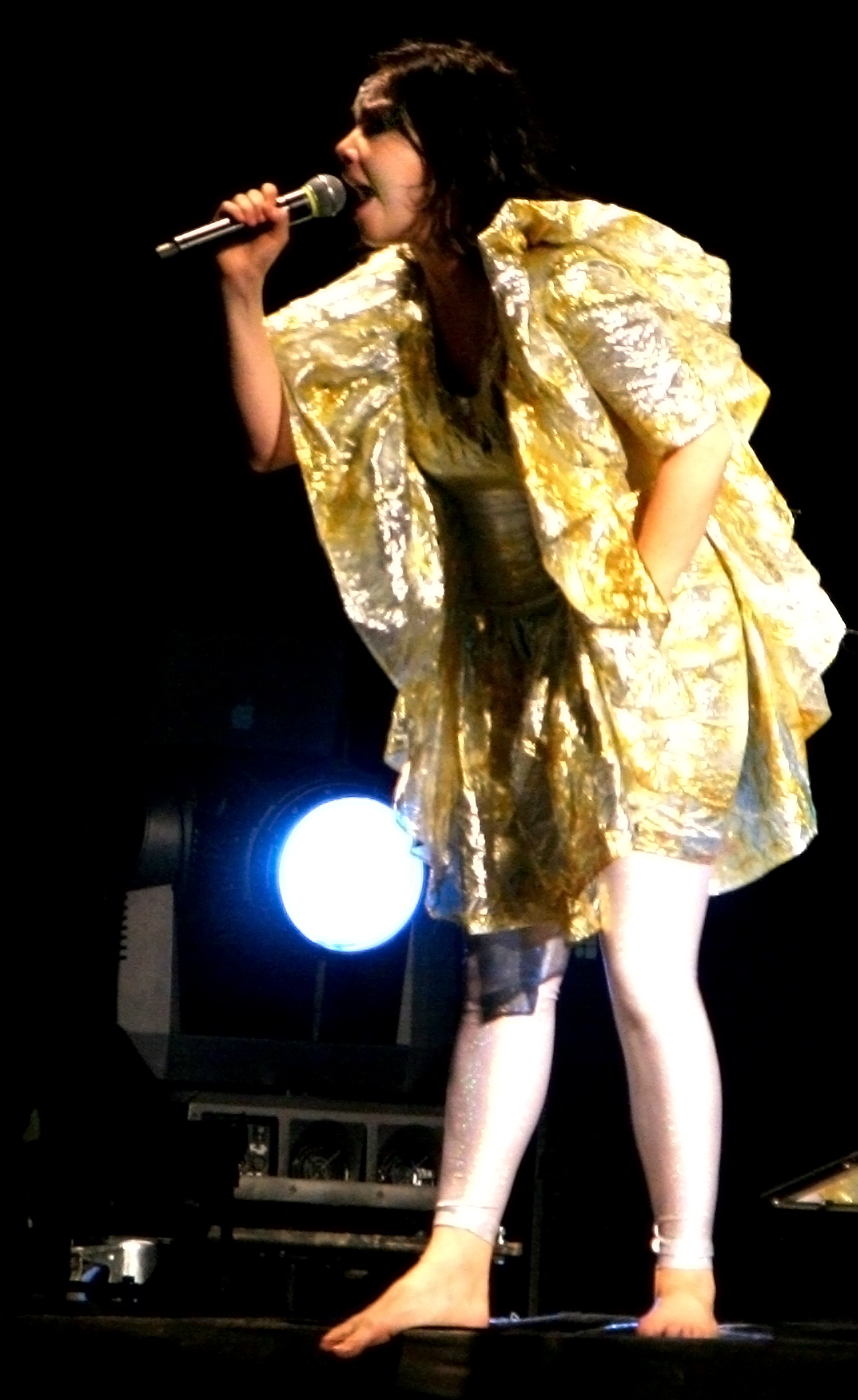
Björk, 1997

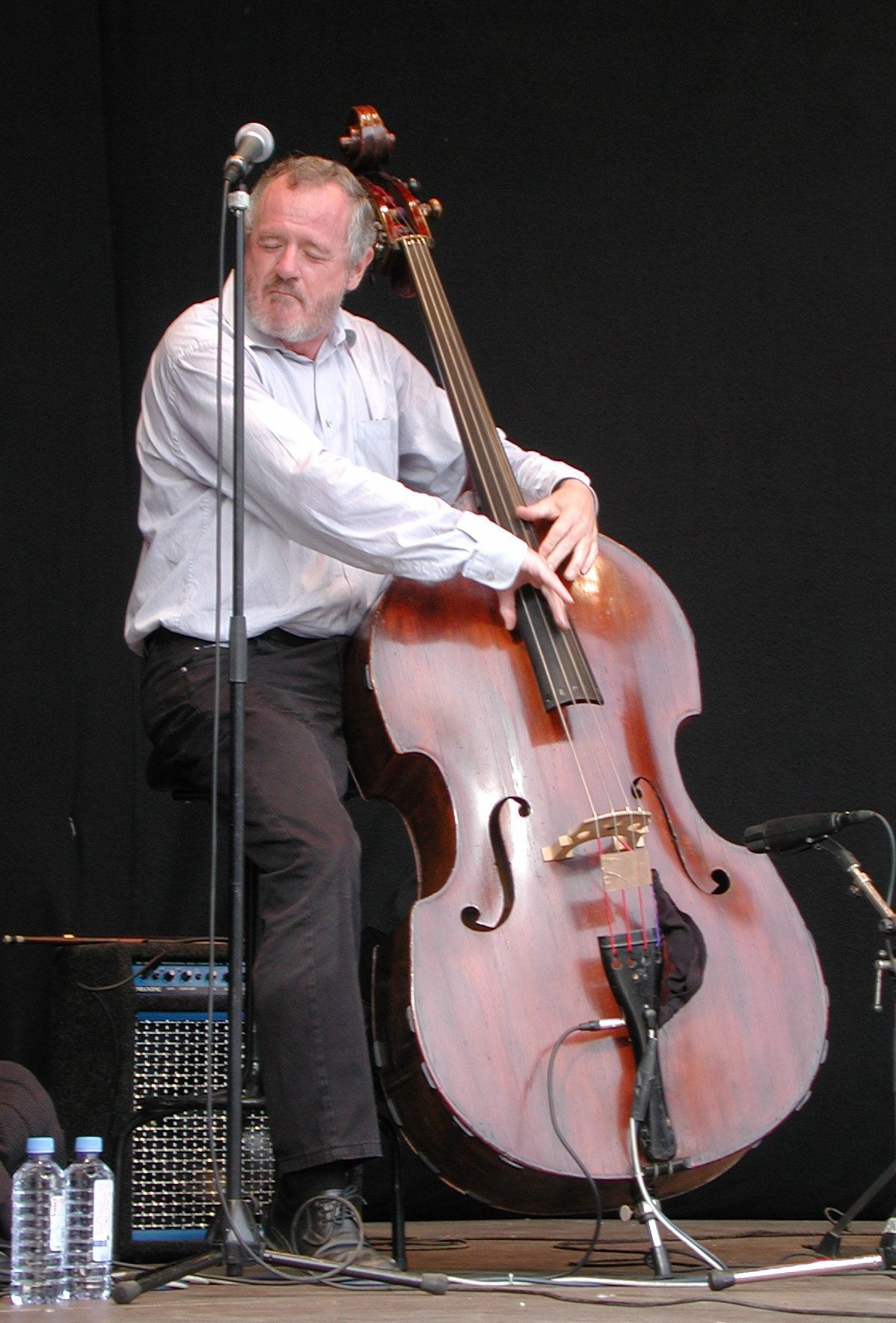
Niels-Henning Ørsted Pedersen, 1991

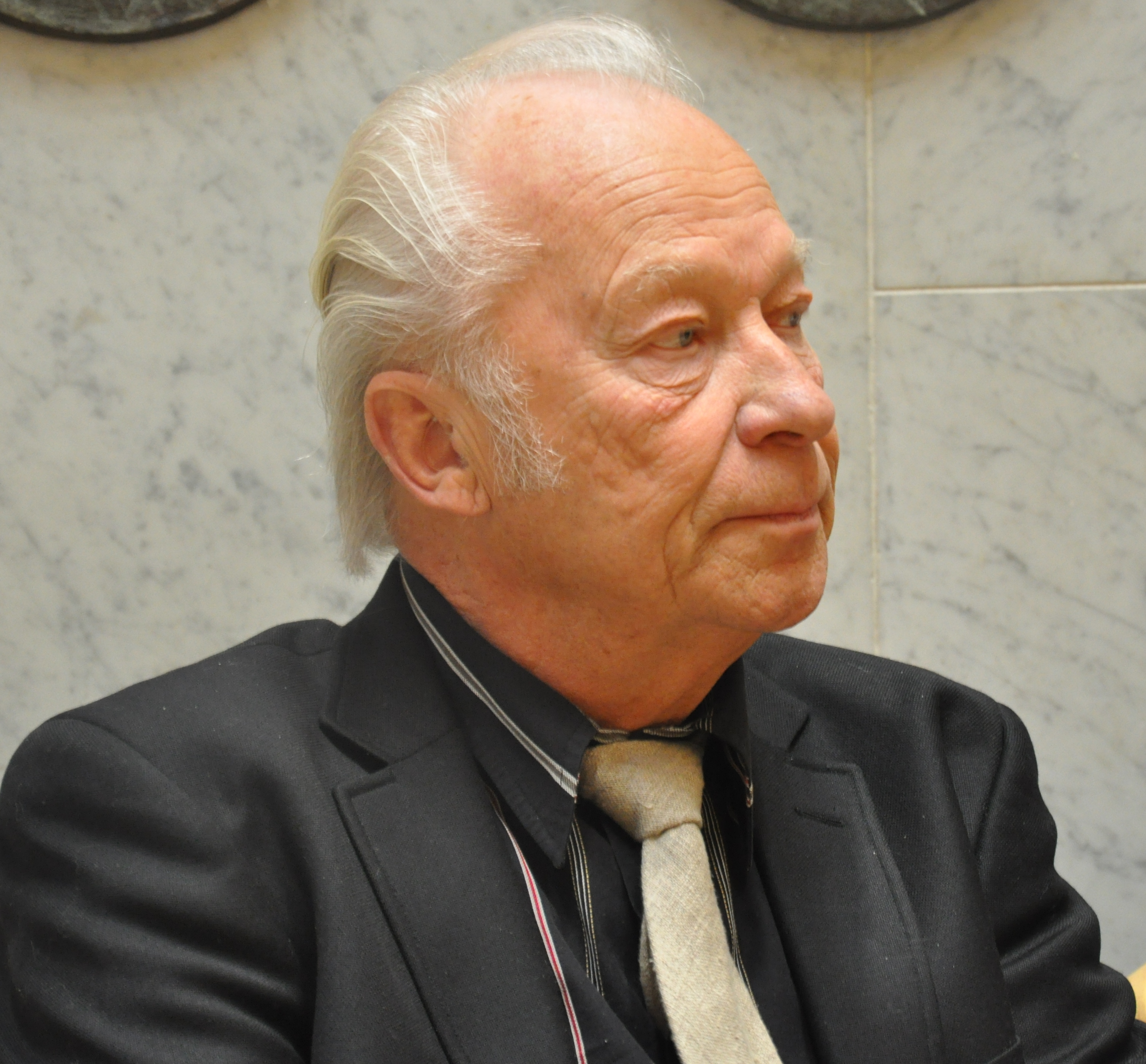
Aulis Sallinen, 1978

The Nordic Council Music Prize is awarded annually by NOMUS, the Nordic Music Committee. Every two years it is awarded for a work by a living composer. In the intervening years it is awarded to a performing musician or ensemble.

== The Nordic Music Committee (NOMUS) ==
The Nordic Council has four art committees:

- The Nordic Literature and Library Committee (NORDBOK)
- The Nordic Music Committee (NOMUS)
- The Nordic Centre for the Performing Arts (NordScen)
- The Nordic Institute for Contemporary Art (NIFCA)

NOMUS consists of two delegates from each of the five Nordic countries (Denmark, Iceland, Norway, Sweden and Finland) and observers from the three areas with self-rule (Greenland, the Faroe Islands and the Åland Islands ). NOMUS awards grants to promote musical co-operation in the Nordic Region; subsidizes commissioned works, musical performances, seminars, conferences and educational courses; and acts as the secretariat and jury of the Nordic Council Music Prize.

== The Nordic Council Music Prize ==
This prize was launched in 1965 and was originally awarded once every three years. Since 1990, however, the prize has been awarded every year. In alternate years it is awarded to a piece of music by a living Nordic composer and to a small or large musical ensemble of high artistic and technical standards. It is currently worth 350,000 Danish kroner.

== Winners ==
The winners of the Nordic Council Music Prize to date have been:

- 1965 Aniara (opera) by Karl-Birger Blomdahl, Sweden
- 1968 Tredje symfonien (Third symphony) by Joonas Kokkonen, Finland
- 1970 Drömmen om Thérèse (arenaopera) by Lars Johan Werle, Sweden
- 1972 Eco (soprano solo, mixed choir, orchestra) by Arne Nordheim, Norway
- 1974 Gilgamesh (opera) by Per Nørgård, Denmark
- 1976 Konsert för flöjt och orkester by Atli Heimir Sveinsson, Iceland
- 1978 Ryttaren (opera) by Aulis Sallinen, Finland
- 1980 Symfoni/Antifoni by Pelle Gudmundsen-Holmgreen, Denmark
- 1982 Utopia by Åke Hermanson, Sweden
- 1984 De ur alla minnen fallna (Requiem) by Sven-David Sandström, Sweden
- 1986 Poemi for solo violin and string orchestra by Hafliði Hallgrímsson, Iceland
- 1988 Kraft (symphonic orchestra, electronics) by Magnus Lindberg, Finland
- 1990 Gjennom Prisme (cello, organ, orchestra) by Olav Anton Thommessen, Norway
- 1991 Niels-Henning Ørsted Pedersen, Denmark Jazz bass player (artist prize)
- 1992 Symfoni nr 1 by Anders Eliasson, Sweden
- 1993 Mellersta Österbottens Kammarorkester, Finland (artist prize)
- 1994 Det Sjungande Trädet (opera) by Erik Bergman, Finland
- 1995 Eric Ericson, Sweden, choir conductor (artist prize)
- 1996 Sterbende Gärten concerto for violin and orchestra by Bent Sørensen, Denmark
- 1997 Björk (Guðmundsdóttir), Iceland, singer and composer (artist prize)
- 1998 Concert for clarinet and orchestra by Rolf Wallin, Norway
- 1999 Leif Segerstam, Finland, conductor (artist prize)
- 2000 Lonh for soprano and electronics by Kaija Saariaho, Finland
- 2001 Palle Mikkelborg, trumpet player, Denmark (artist prize)
- 2002 Symphony no. 1 – Oceanic Days by Sunleif Rasmussen, Faroe Islands
- 2003 Mari Boine, singer, Norway (artist prize)
- 2004 Gudrun's 4th song by Haukur Tómasson, Iceland
- 2005 Ensemble Cikada, Norway (artist prize)
- 2006 ...fetters... by Natasha Barrett, Norway
- 2007 The Eric Ericson Chamber Choir from Stockholm (artist prize)
- 2008 Miki Alone by Peter Bruun, Denmark
- 2009 Kari Kriikku, clarinettist, Finland (artist prize)
- 2010 Opus 42 by Lasse Thoresen, Norway
- 2011 Mats Gustafsson, saxophonist, Sweden (artist prize)
- 2012 Dreymi by Anna Thorvaldsdóttir, Iceland
- 2013 Pekka Kuusisto, violinist, Finland (artist prize)
- 2014 Black Box Music by Simon Steen-Andersen, Denmark
- 2015 Svante Henryson, cellist, Sweden (artist prize)
- 2016 Let me tell you, Hans Abrahamsen, Denmark
- 2017 Susanna Mälkki, conductor and cellist, Finland (artist prize)
- 2018 Muohta, Nils Henrik Asheim, Norway
- 2019 Gyða Valtýsdóttir, composer and solo musician, Iceland (artist prize)
- 2020 Quarter-tone Piano Concerto by Sampo Haapamäki, Finland
- 2021 Eivør Pálsdóttir, musician, Faroe Islands
- 2022 Karin Rehnqvist, composer, Sweden
- 2023 Maija Kauhanen, musician, Finland
- 2024 Om Lys og Lethed by Rune Glerup, Denmark
- 2025 Víkingur Ólafsson, pianist, Iceland
- 2026 Elja by Kristine Tjøgersen and Benedicte Maurseth, Norway
