= Þorgerður Ingólfsdóttir =

Icelandic choral conductor (born 1943)

Þorgerður Ingólfsdóttir (also spelt Thorgerdur Ingolfsdottir) is an Icelandic choral conductor, known for founding and directing the Hamrahlid Choir.

== Biography ==
Þorgerður was born in Reykjavík, Iceland, on November 5, 1943 and began her music studies at the age of seven. She completed her gymnasium studies at Menntaskólinn í Reykjavík in 1963, and a music teacher’s degree from the Reykjavík School of Music in 1965. From 1965 to 1967 she studied musicology and choral conducting at the master’s level at the University of Illinois in the United States. While at the University of Illinois, she sang in the choir. She also studied in Austria and England, and took courses in theology at the University of Iceland. She was a teacher at the Reykjavík School of Music from 1967 to 2000.

Þorgerður is known for her leadership of young people interested in choral music. She founded the Hamrahlid College Choir in 1967; and a choir of its graduates, the Hamrahlid Choir, in 1982. She has described her work as being not only about music, but about forming and educating young people in the widest sense. More than 2,500 Icelandic teenagers have come into contact with classical music through the Hamrahlid choral experience.

Þorgerður was Iceland’s delegate in Nomus (the Nordic Music Committee) from 2001 to 2007 and music consultant of Europa Cantat 2003–2009. Þorgerður has been a member of the World Choir Council since 2004. She has been a lecturer and an adjudicator in several music competitions and festivals in Europe. In 2000 she was the principal conductor of the Voices of Europe, a multi-national youth choir made up of singers from each of that year’s nine European Capitals of Culture. For that occasion, the Estonian composer Arvo Pärt composed Which Was the Son of ..., which is dedicated to her.

The Icelandic singer Björk sang with the Hamrahlid Choir when she was young, and Þorgerður directed the Hamrahlid Choir's singing on Björk’s album Utopia, released in 2017. The choir also performed at her concert series Cornucopia at The Shed, New York City, in May 2019, and later that year in various European cities.

Þorgerður's retirement from the position of choir director for the Hamrahlid Choir was announced in 2017.

== Honors and awards ==
In 1975 Þorgerður received the Leonie Sonnings Music Fund prize and the Prize of Optimism for outstanding Icelandic artists from Brøste in Copenhagen in 1983. In 1992 the Icelandic Performing Rights Society granted her special recognition for the performance of Icelandic choral music. She was awarded the Order of the Knight of the Falcon by the President of Iceland in 1985 for her musical work in Iceland, and the King of Norway appointed her a Commander of the Royal Order of Merit in 1992. In 2008 she was made an honorary member of the Society of Icelandic Musicians and in 2012 she was appointed Reykjavík City’s Honorary Artist. In 2013 she received the Honorary Award of the Icelandic Music Awards, and in 2016 she was presented with a Special Recognition Award from the University of Iceland’s School of Education, for her outstanding achievement as teacher. In 2018 Þorgerður was awarded honorary citizenship of the City of Reykjavík, and in the same year the Icelandic parliament appointed her Honorary State Artist for life. In 2021, she was nominated for the Nordic Council Music Prize.

== Personal life ==
Þorgerður is married to the Norwegian poet Knut Ødegård. She comes from a musical family, and one of her sisters is the violinist Rut Ingólfsdóttir.
