= Reykjavík Arts Festival =

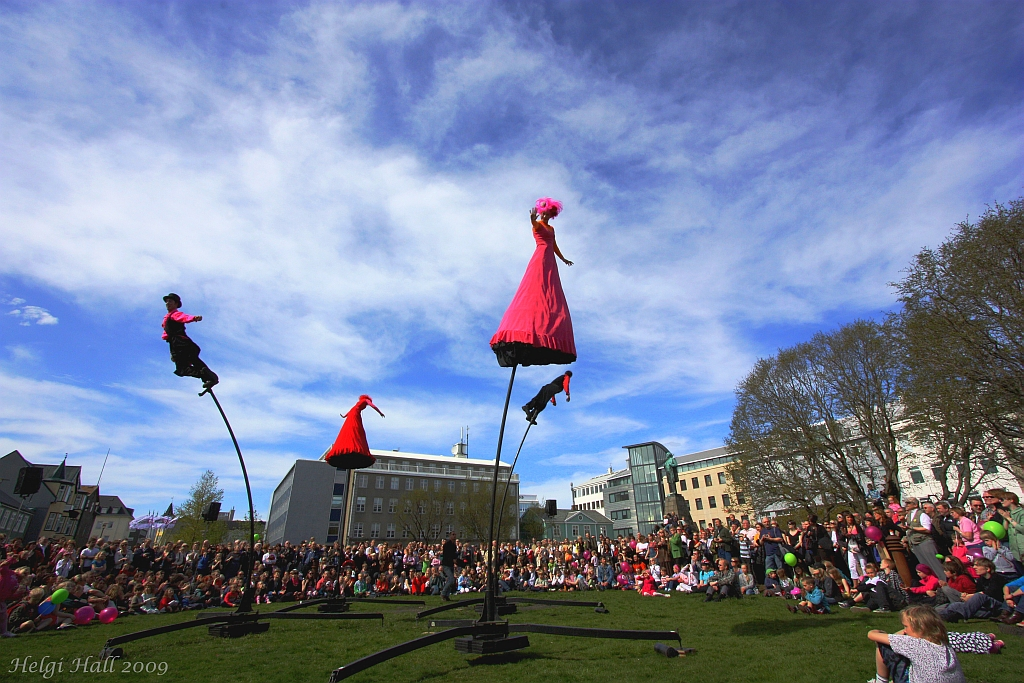
2009 edition

The Reykjavík Arts Festival is an art festival that takes place in Reykjavík every other year. It was founded in 1970 and was biennial from the beginning, but in the years 2005–2016 it was held annually. Since 2016, the festival has again become a biennial event. Next edition will take place in 1–16 June 2024.

== History ==
The Association for the Arts in Reykjavík (Samtök um Listahátíð í Reykjavík) was founded on 10 March 1969. Its background was that Vladimir Ashkenazy, who was living in Iceland at the time, and Ivar Eskeland, director of the Nordic House, encouraged the city to hold an international music festival on the one hand, and a Nordic culture festival on the other. After discussions between the Association of Icelandic Artists, the Minister of Education and the city authorities, it was decided to combine these ideas and create an international Art Festival in Reykjavík, which was held for the first time in the summer of 1970.

Since then, thousands of artists have performed at the Art Festival in Reykjavík. Among them is Led Zeppelin, Jacqueline du Pré, Jóhannes S. Kjarval, Helgi Tómasson, Erró, Luciano Pavarotti, Ingmar Bergman, Guerrilla Girls, and many more.

The festival is responsible for the Eyrarrósinni award, together with the Construction Institute and the Icelandic Airlines.

From 1978 to 1993, and Art & Film Festival was held in connection with the festival and became the oldest film festival in the Nordics.
