= The Hamrahlid Choir =

Icelandic choir

The Hamrahlid Choir or Hamrahlíðarkórinn as it is called in Icelandic was founded in 1981 by Þorgerður Ingólfsdóttir, who has remained its conductor since then. The choir consists of alumni of Menntaskólinn við Hamrahlíð (Hamrahlid College) in Iceland who were formerly members of The Choir of Hamrahlid College, conducted by Ingólfsdóttir until her official retirement in 2017. The choir should not be confused with the Hamrahlid College Choir, which continues to operate under the direction of Ingólfsdóttir's successor, Hreiðar Ingi Þorsteinsson.

The choir has traveled extensively and toured dozens of countries in Europe, North America and Asia, as well as Israel and collaborated with renowned conductors such as Tõnu Kaljuste, Osmo Vänskä, Lukas Foss, László Heltay, Robert King, Timothy Brown, Gustav Sjökvist, Willi Gohl, Hansruedi Willisegger, Johan Dujick, Petri Sakari and Thomas Adés. Recent ventures include the 2015 Europa Cantat festival in Pécs, Hungary and the 2017 Aberdeen International Youth Festival in Scotland. The choir has also made a career in Iceland by singing big pieces by composers such as Mozart, Beethoven, Stravinsky with the distinguished Iceland Symphony Orchestra.

Throughout its history, the choir has collaborated closely with Icelandic composers. Over 100 works have been composed especially for the choir, including works by virtually all of Iceland's leading composers. Apart from its close association with native composers, the choir has collaborated with foreign artist such as Arvo Pärt, John Cage and Vagn Holmboe in the first Icelandic performances of their works. Arvo Pärt was so impressed with the choir's performance of his Te Deum in 1998 that he composed a choral work dedicated to Þorgerður Ingólfsdóttir, Which was the son of..., which was premièred in 2000.

The choir was awarded Performer of the year at the 2002 Icelandic Music Awards and has released several CDs and gramophone records.

In 2019, The Hamrahlid Choir was part of the line-up for Icelandic singer Björk's Cornucopia concert tour. They featured in the New York residency from the 6th of May to the 1st of June as well as the European leg of the tour consisting of eight concerts in eight countries. Björk herself was once a member of the choir and utilized them for the Utopia track "Body Memory". Airfare for the 50-person choir was provided by the Icelandic government, with Minister of Education Lilja Alfreðsdóttir saying, "the state often strengthens cultural events" and "this will be very good for all parties".

In 2020, they released the album Come and Be Joyful that featured renditions of Icelandic folk songs as well as covers of Cosmogony and Sonnets by Björk on which the singer collaborated.

== Discography ==
=== LPs ===
- 1978: Ljós og hljómar / Light and Sounds
- 1982: Öld hraðans / The Age of Speed
- 1982: Mattheusarpassía/ St Matthew Passion (credited to Pólýfónkórinn, Hamrahlíðarkórinn, Kór Öldutúnsskóla og 2 kammersveitir)
- 1985: Haustmyndir / Autumn Pictures

=== CDs ===
- 1988: Kveðið í bjargi / Invocation from the Rock
- 1990: Turtildúfan, jarðarberið og úlfaldalestin / The Turtle Dove, the Strawberry and the Desert Caravan
- 1993: Íslensk þjóðlög / Icelandic Folk Songs
- 1996: Íslenskir jólasöngvar og Maríukvæði / Icelandic Christmas Songs and Hymns to the Virgin
- 2002: Vorkvæði um Ísland / Icelandic Spring Poem
- 2003: Mansöngur um Ólafs rímu Grænlendings / Ballad of Olaf the Greenlander
- 2008: Þorkell / Choral Music by Þorkell Sigurbjörnsson
- 2009: Jólasagan / The Christmas Story
- 2013: Djúpsins ró / Calm of the Deep (with Nordic Affect)
- 2017: Íslenskir jólasöngvar og Maríukvæði / Icelandic Christmas Songs
- 2020: Come and be Joyful
