= Reykjavík College of Music =

Icelandic gymnasium and music conservatory

Coordinates: 64°08′24″N 21°53′56″W

The Reykjavík College of Music (Icelandic: Menntaskóli í tónlist) is an Icelandic gymnasium (junior college) and music conservatory founded in 2017.

It was created by the merger of the graduate levels of Tónlistarskólinn í Reykjavík (also known as Reykjavík College of Music) and Tónlistarskóli FÍH (Conservatory of the Icelandic Musicians Union). Non-music classes are offered by the Menntaskólinn við Hamrahlíð. Two degree paths are offered: A gymnasium degree path (in classical, rhythmic, or pop music) and a general path. As of 2019 it had around 200 students.

== History ==
=== Tónlistarskólinn í Reykjavík ===
Tónlistarskólinn í Reykjavík was founded in 1930 and was the oldest surviving college of music in the country. It offered music education at intermediate, continuing, and university levels. Students graduated with a degree equivalent to a B.A. in performance, singing or composition or a B.Ed. in music education. It also operated a symphony orchestra (Orchestra of the Reykjavík College of Music).
