= Hans-Kristian Kjos Sørensen =

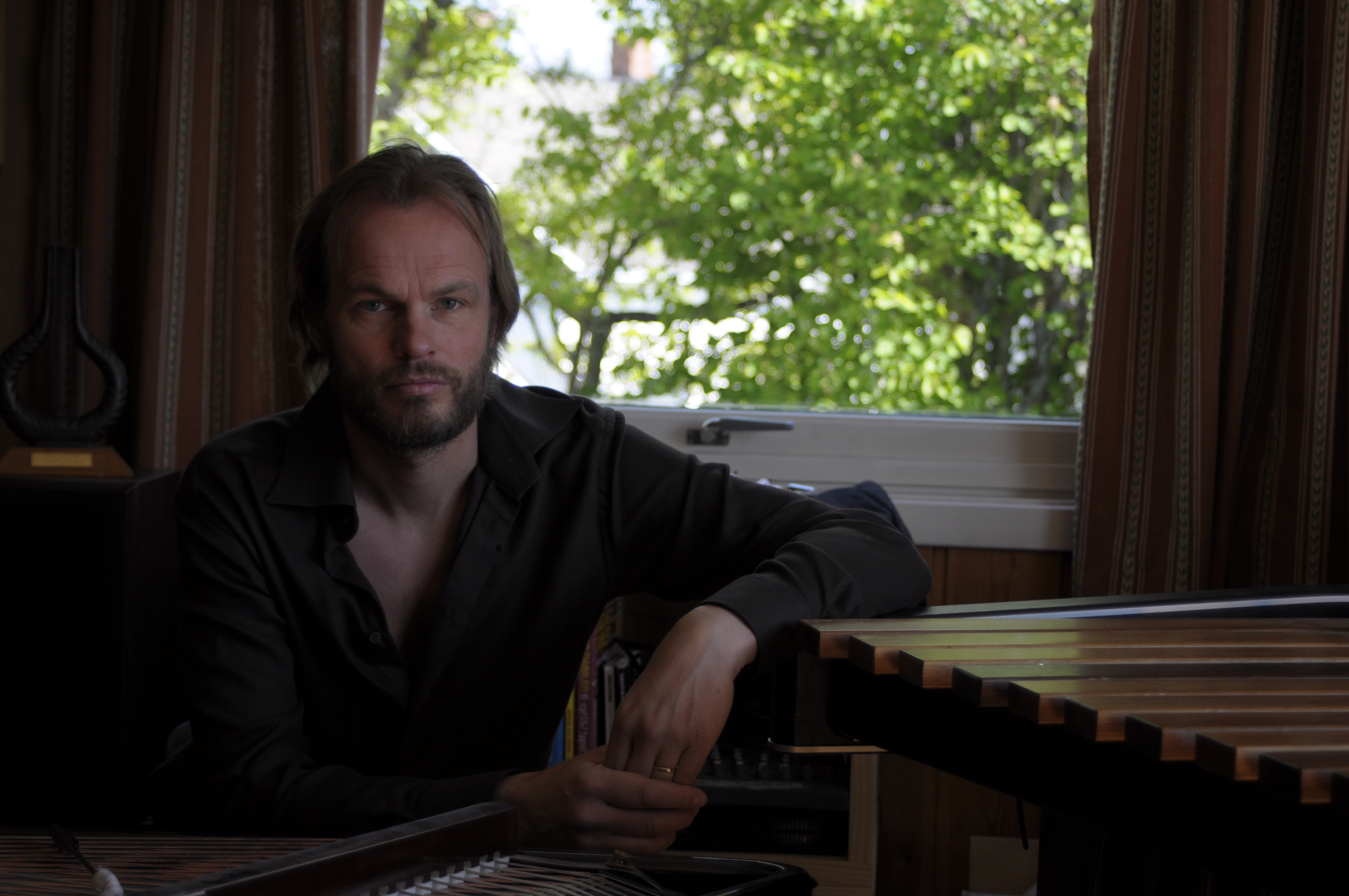
- HKKS in his studio at his home, Strømmen, 2010

Background information
- Also known as: HKKS
- Born: Oslo, Norway
- Genres: Classical music, improvised music, jazz
- Occupations: Musician, composer, educator
- Instruments: Percussion, cimbalom
- Website: hkks.no

Hans-Kristian Kjos Sørensen is a Norwegian percussion and cimbalom player.

== Career ==
Born in Oslo, Hans-Kristian Kjos Sørensen started to play music at the age of seven and grew up playing percussion, piano and tuba. He studied percussion at the Norwegian Academy of Music. After a short period as principal percussionist in Stavanger Symphony Orchestra (1989) and later Bergen Philharmonic Orchestra (1990–91), he went on to study at the Banff School of Fine Arts in Canada and at the Conservatoire National de Région Versailles with Sylvio Gualda, where he obtained the Prix de Perfectionnement à l'unanimité. He is also a prizewinner from CIEM-competition in Geneva 1992.

He has worked with composers like Olga Neuwirth, Henrik Hellstenius, Ørjan Matre, Lars Petter Hagen, Eivind Buene, George Crumb, Rolf Wallin, Brett Dean, Svante Henryson, Åse Hedstrøm and Per Nørgård, who dedicated to him the piece "Isternia" for cimbalom solo in 2010. As a soloist he has played with ensembles like Philharmonia Orchestra, Oslo Philharmonic, Vienna Radio Symphony Orchestra, Orchestre de chambre de Paris, Trondheim Symphony Orchestra, Bergen Philharmonic Orchestra, Gävle Symphony Orchestra, Malmö Symphony Orchestra, Swedish Chamber Orchestra, the Norwegian Opera, BIT20, the Norwegian Soloist Choir and the Norwegian Chamber orchestra.

He has been featured on a number of albums with improvised and notated music in jazz, baroque and classical genres, recorded for Ultron Records, BIS, ECM, Deutsche Grammophon, and Aurora. His solo album OPEN won the Spellemannprisen (the Norwegian Grammy) for 2003. Kjos Sørensen has held a professorship in percussion at The Norwegian Academy of Music in Oslo. He is a recipient of the Norwegian State Grants since 2020

== Discography ==
A partial list of his recordings includes:

- Mikhail Alperin: "First Impression". Misha Alperin, piano, John Surman, s & b saxophones, Arkady Shilkloper, French horn/fluegelhorn, Terje Gewelt, bass, Jon Christensen, drums, Hans-Kristian Kjos Sørensen, percussion. (CD ECM 1664)
- Mikhail Alperin: "Night". Misha Alperin, piano, Anja Lechner, cello, Hans-Kristian Kjos Sørensen, percussion. (CD ECM 1769)
- John Cage: A Flower. Hans-Kristian Kjos Sørensen, piano & voice. (CD BIS 1219)
- John Cage: The Wonderful widow of Eighteen Springs. Hans-Kristian Kjos Sørensen, piano & voice. (CD BIS 1219)
- John Cage: In a Landscape. Hans-Kristian Kjos Sørensen, cimbalom. (SACD Ultron 001)
- Brett Dean: "Recollections". Sharon Kam, clarinet, Marie-Luise Neunecker, horn, Hans-Kristian Kjos Sørensen, percussion, Alexander Lonquich, piano, Antje Weithaas, violin, Hartmut Rohde, viola, Tanja Tetzlaff, cello, Yasunori Kawahara, doublebass. (CD AVI 8553100)
- Franco Donatoni: Omar. Hans-Kristian Kjos Sørensen, vibraphone. (CD BIS 1219)
- Andrea Falconieri: Chaconne in G-major. Daniel Hope & Lorenza Borrani, violins, Jonathan Cohen, cello, Kristian Bezuidenhout, harpsichord, Stefan Maass & Stephan Rath, lute/guitar/theorbo, HKKS, percussion. (CD DG 477-8094)
- Lars Petter Hagen: Lament for solo percussion and choir. Hans-Kristian Kjos Sørensen, percussion, Pierre-André Valade, conductor, Det Norske Solistkor. (CD BIS 2431)
- Åse Hedstrøm: Flow. Hans-Kristian Kjos Sørensen, marimba. (CD BIS 1219)
- Henrik Hellstenius: Readings of Mr.G for percussion and strings. Hans-Kristian Kjos Sørensen, percussion/voice, Pierre-André Valade, conductor, BIT20 Ensemble. (CD ACD 5047)
- Henrik Hellstenius: Public Behaviour for solo percussion, vocal ensemble and orchestra. Hans-Kristian Kjos Sørensen, percussion/voice, Nordic Voices, Stavanger Symphony Orchestra, Ilan Volkov, conductor, Stavanger Symphony Orchestra. (CD BIS 2665)
- Henrik Hellstenius: Readings of Mr.G for solo percussion. Hans-Kristian Kjos Sørensen, percussion/voice. (SACD Ultron 001)
- Henrik Hellstenius: Ombra della sera. Hans-Kristian Kjos Sørensen, percussion, Dan Styffe, double-bass. (CD ACD 5047)
- Jean-Marie Leclair: Tambourin. Daniel Hope, violin, Jonathan Cohen, cello, Kristian Bezuidenhout, harpsichord, Stefan Maass, guitar, HKKS, percussion. (CD DG 477-8094)
- Nicola Matteis: Ground after the Scotch Humour. Daniel Hope, violin, Jonathan Cohen, cello, Kristian Bezuidenhout, harpsichord, Stefan Maass, guitar, HKKS, percussion. (CD DG 477-8094)
- Moscow Art Trio: Music. Arkady Shilkloper, fr.horn/fluegelhorn, Sergey Nikolaevich Starostin, voice/clarinet/alto clarinet/folk reeds, Mikhail Alperin, piano/melodica/claviola/tubes, Hans-Kristian Kjos Sørensen, percussion/marimba. (CD JARO 4214-2)
- Arne Nordheim: Signals. Frode Haltli, accordion, Raoul Björkenheim, electric guitar, Hans-Kristian Kjos Sørensen, percussion. (CD Simax PSC1328)
- Per Nørgård: Der göttliche Tivoli. Hans-Kristian Kjos Sørensen, percussion-solo. Dorian Keilhack, conductor. Stadtteater Bern. (CD Dacapo 6.220572-73)
- Per Nørgård: Isternia. Hans-Kristian Kjos Sørensen, solo cimbalom. (SACD Ultron 001)
- Diego Ortiz: Ricercata segunda. Daniel Hope & Lorenza Borrani, violins, Jonathan Cohen, cello, Kristian Bezuidenhout, harpsichord, Stefan Maass & Stephan Rath, lute/theorbo, HKKS, percussion. (CD DG 477-8094)
- Hans-Kristian Kjos Sørensen: Royal Garden. Hans-Kristian Kjos Sørensen, percussion. (CD ECM 1628)
- Hans-Kristian Kjos Sørensen: Open 1–3. Hans-Kristian Kjos Sørensen, percussion. (CD BIS 1219)
- Hans-Kristian Kjos Sørensen: Call. Hans-Kristian Kjos Sørensen, cimbalom. (SACD Ultron 001)
- Hans-Kristian Kjos Sørensen: Far.. Hans-Kristian Kjos Sørensen, percussion. (SACD Ultron 001)
- Hans-Kristian Kjos Sørensen: Fly. Hans-Kristian Kjos Sørensen, vibraphone. (SACD Ultron 001)
- Hans-Kristian Kjos Sørensen: Hearing Things. Hans-Kristian Kjos Sørensen, cimbalom, voice. (SACD Ultron 001)
- Antonio Valente: Gagliarda Napolitana. Daniel Hope, violin, Jonathan Cohen, cello, Kristian Bezuidenhout, harpsichord, Stefan Maass, guitar, HKKS, percussion. (CD DG 477-8094)
- Johann Paul von Westhoff: La Guerra cosí nominata di sua maestà. Daniel Hope, violin, Jonathan Cohen, cello, Kristian Bezuidenhout, harpsichord, Stefan Maass, guitar, HKKS, percussion. (CD DG 477-8094)
- Rolf Wallin: Stonewave for solo-percussion. Hans-Kristian Kjos Sørensen, percussion. (CD BIS 1219)
- Christian Wallumrød Trio: The Birch. Arve Henriksen, trumpet, Christian Wallumrød, piano, Hans-Kristian Kjos Sørensen, percussion. (CD ECM 1628)
- Iannis Xenakis: Rebonds. Hans-Kristian Kjos Sørensen, percussion. (CD BIS 1219)
- Iannis Xenakis: Psappha. Hans-Kristian Kjos Sørensen, percussion. Martin Horntveth, live electronics. (SACD Ultron 001)
