= Nils Henrik Asheim =

Norwegian composer and organist

- Born: 20 January 1960 (age 66); Oslo, Norway
- Genre: Contemporary music
- Occupations: Musician, composer
- Instrument: Keyboards

Nils Henrik Asheim (born 20 January 1960 in Oslo, Norway) is a Norwegian composer and organist, living in Stavanger.

Asheim is educated at Norges Musikkhøgskole and the Sweelinck Conservatory in Amsterdam. His production comprises chamber music, orchestral works, sacred music, musical theater and digital music, and his Lillehammer −94 fanfare is released on record by "Gardemusikken". Asheim is awarded Spellemannprisen twice, in 2005 in the class Contemporary music, for 19 March 2004, Oslo Cathedral and 2010 in the class Contemporary composer of the year, for Mazurka – remaking Chopin. He was also nominated in 2003 in Open class for Kom regn together with Anne-Lise Berntsen. He was awarded Edvard-prisen for "Chase" in 2002 in the class Contemporary music and in 2011 he was awarded Lindemanprisen.

== Honors ==
- Spellemannprisen 2005 in the class Contemporary music, for 19 March 2004, Oslo Cathedral
- Arne Nordheim's Composer Award 2007
- Spellemannprisen 2010 in the class Contemporary composer of the year, for Mazurka – remaking Chopin
- Edvard Prize in the class Contemporary music, for "Chase"
- Lindemanprisen 2011

== Discography ==
As composer

- 1988. Flere artister. Kruse, Olav Berg, Asheim, Samkopf, Bjørn Korsan Hoemsnes, Ivar Lunde Jr..
- 1992. Gaute Vikdal. Skygger. Trombone, one track by Asheim
- 1993. Flere artister. New Norwegian violin music III, one track by Asheim
- 1995. Borealis, Cikada, mfl. Norwegian contemporary music, one track by Asheim
- 1995. Bit 20. Miniatures. Ett spor av Asheim
- 1995. Barratt-Dues Junior Orchestra: Asheim, Kraggerud, Grieg, Hellstenius.
- 1999. Njål Vindenes. Sequenza guitar, one track by Asheim
- 2000. Kyberia. Navigations, one track by Asheim
- 2001. Stavanger new music ensemble. 1-2-3 happy happy happy!, works by Schaatun, Ness, Asheim, Hvoslef, Janson
- 2007. Vertavokvartetten, Broken line

As performer

- 1993. Prisms; Wie ein Hauch av Yngve Slettholm. Water; Mirror by Nils Henrik Asheim, with Cikada a.o.
- 1994. Engleskyts. Med Anne-Lise Berntsen
- 2002. 16 pieces for organ
- 2003. Kom regn. Med Anne-Lise Berntsen
- 2005. 19 March 2004, Oslo Cathedral. Orgel, improvisations
- 2007. Orkan. Til tekster av Sigbjørn Obstfelder. Med Anne-Lise Berntsen a.o.
- 2007. Grand mutation. Med Lasse Marhaug
- 2010. Mazurka – remaking Chopin

Awards
Preceded by Ruben S. Gjertsen	Recipient of the Spellemannprisen contemporary composer award 2010	Succeeded by Rolf Wallin
