= Jan Erik Mikalsen =

Norwegian composer (born 1979)

- Born: 6 May 1979 (age 47); Kristiansund, Møre og Romsdal
- Origin: Norway
- Genres: Contemporary music
- Occupation: Composer
- Website: www.janerikmikalsen.no

Jan Erik Mikalsen (born 6 May 1979 in Kristiansund, Norway) is a Norwegian composer of contemporary music, living in Oslo.

== Biography ==
Mikalsen studied at the Grieg Academy in Bergen and the Royal Danish Academy of Music in Copenhagen, and is a member of the Norwegian Society of Composers. He has composed a number of works performed and commissioned by orchestras like Oslo Philharmonic Orchestra, Tokyo Philharmonic Orchestra, Bergen Philharmonic Orchestra, Stavanger Symphony Orchestra, Norrköping Symphony Orchestra, Kringkastingsorkesteret, Oslo Sinfonietta, Bodø Sinfonietta, Thomas Bloch, Reykjavik Chamber Orchestra, Quartet Artis Wien, Stavanger Samtidsensemble, Orchestre de Flutes Francais, Manger Musikklag, Ingrid Torvund, Tori Wrånes and Bård Ask. He has participated in festivals such as Présences Festival, Pablo Casals Festival, Ultima Oslo Contemporary Music Festival, Casa Da Musica, Performa 13, Young Nordic Music and Nordic Music Days.

Mikalsen also won the award from the Kavlifondet, and the Stavanger Symphony Orchestra's Nordic / Baltic Composers Workshop 2004–2005 with the work Ghouls & Moons premiered by the same orchestra under the main series, on October 20, 2005. His collaboration with visual artist Bård Ash during 2013 and 2014 has resulted in a number of works, including Notio Viri Placet shown in Bergen, London, Paris and Oslo.

In January 2010 Björn Nyman and Kringkastingsorkesteret premiered the work Clarinet Concerto at stage 2, in The Norwegian Opera and Ballet in Oslo. In 2014 the commissioned work Music for solo flute and sinfonietta was premiered by Elisabeth Kristensen Eide and Bodø Sinfonietta. January 20, 2012, the work Parts II for Orchestra was premiered by the Tokyo Philharmonic Orchestra, as one of four works in the finals of Toru Takemitsu Composition Award competition (referee Salvatore Sciarrino). The same composition won the Edvardprisen in 2012. The work Wagner Prelude was commissioned by Queen Sonja International Music Competition in 2013 and premiered in the main hall in Den Norske Opera by the opera orchestra during the final concert. In autumn 2014 Kringkastingsorkesteret premiered the commissioned work Songs for Orchestra. The BIT20 Ensemble commissioned the work Too much of a good thing which was premiered in autumn 2014 a new commissioned work for solo piano and sinfonietta in Bergen. The work was again performed under the Huddersfield Contemporary Music Festival in England that year. Mikalsen was awarded Intro composer for the period 2014–2016. The composition Songs for Orchestra won the 2015 International Rostrum of Composers (IRC), organized by the International Music Council, and it will be broadcast in some 30 countries around the world. September 2017 saw the Oslo Philharmonic Orchestra premiering Mikalsen's latest orchestral work, Just for You for Piano Solo and Orchestra, featuring Ellen Ugelvik as piano soloist and conductor Lars-Erik Ter Jung.

== Honors ==
- 2011: Parts II for Orchestra received a 3rd place at the Toru Takemitsu Composition Award in Tokyo judged by Salvatore Sciarrino
- 2012: Winner of the Edvardprisen for the work Parts II for Orchestra premiered by Tokyo Philharmonic Orchestra
- 2015: Winner of the 62nd International Rostrum of Composers (IRC) in the general category for the composition Songs For Orchestra

== Production ==
=== Selected works ===
==== Orchestral works ====
- Just for You for Piano Solo and Orchestra (2017)
- Songr Parts II for Orchestra (2017)
- Songr for Orchestra (2014)
- Parts II for Orchestra (2012)
- Clarinet Concerto (2010)
- Parts for Orchestra (2009)
- Wagner Prelude (2013)
- Ghouls & Moons (2005)
- Garbage Sun (2003).
- Saws of Pygar (2006)

==== Works for sinfonietta ====
- Too much of a good thing is wonderful (2014)
- Concerto for Ondes Martenot and Sinfonietta (2008)

==== Chamber music ====
- Sonette (2015)
- Lied (2012)
- Songs (2012)
- Weeps & Ghosts (2006)
- Night songs (2007)
- La Disparition des Fantômes (2007)

==== Duo works ====
- Play Fun (2008)
- Folk Tunes (2007)

==== Solo works ====
- Sonate for piano (2012)
- Pieces for Violin (2010)
- More Play Fun (2008)
- Angel Stories (2005)

==== Works for video and exhibitions ====
- Magic Blood Machine (2012)
- Monument: Hymn for Giant Bowl for marching band (2009)
- Ni Estas Movado (2006)

=== Discography (in selection) ===
- 2006: Lights Out, with the Norwegian Radio Orchestra
- 2010: Black Spaces, with pianist Kristian Lindberg the piece "Angels Stories"
- 2012: Nine solos for nine violinists, Guro Kleven Hagen
- 2017: Saan, with Oslo-Filharmonien/Kringkastingsorkestret/POING, nominated for the contemporary Spellemannprisen

Awards
Preceded by Ørjan Matre	Recipient of the contemporary music Edvardprisen; 2013	Succeeded by Magnar Åm
