= Edvardprisen =

Norwegian music award

Edvard Prize
- Native name: Edvard-prisen
- Description: Recognition of Norwegian composers and songwriters
- Country: Norway
- Presented by: TONO
- Rewards: 50,000 kr, Edvard trophy, and a diploma
- First award: 1998
- Currently held by: Members of TONO (musicians and composers)
- Website: https://www.tono.no/om-tono/priser-og-stipender/edvardprisen-tonos-formidlerpris/

The Edvard Prize is a Norwegian music award in given by TONO, copyright organization for musicians and composers. The honor, which was given for the first time in 1998, is given each year and is only given to organization members. The goal is to enhance the musical life and increase awareness of Norwegian composers and writers and their works. The prize is named after the Norwegian composer Edvard Grieg.

Number of prize levels have varied since the start. As of 2007 Edvard Prize presents prizes in 4 categories:

- Contemporary
- Popular
- Open class
- Lyrics

The winner in each category receives NKR 50 000,- and the Edvard trophy (design: Bruno Oldani) and a diploma. The award is a continuation of the price Work of the Year, which was awarded from 1965 to 1996.

As of 2022, the winner has been rewarded with NKR 70 000, the diploma and a unique trophy, now designed by Magne Furuholmen

== Winners ==
=== 1998 ===
Category	Performer	Title
Popular music – minor work	Jan Eggum	På'an igjen
Popular music – major work	Karl Seglem/Reidar Skår	TYA
Music for another art form	Kjetil Bjerkestrand/Magne Furuholmen	Hotel Oslo
Lyrics	Odd Børretzen	Vintersang
Contemporary music – minor work	John Persen	Arvesøl
Contemporary music – major verk	Jon Øivind Ness	Cascading Ordure
The Jury's honorary Award 1998	Knut Nystedt	

=== 1999 ===
Category	Performer	Title
Popular music – minor work	Jørn Christensen	Velvet Days
Popular music – major work	Mikhail «Misha» Alperin	Night Moods
Contemporary music – minor work	Maja S. Ratkje	Waves II b
Contemporary music – major work	Olav Anton Thommessen	BULLseye (fiolinkonsert)
Music for another art form	Åsmund Feidje	Jobs bok
The Jury's honorary Award 1999	Egil Monn-Iversen	

=== 2000 ===
Category	Performer	Title
Popular music – major work	Jon Balke	Solarized
Popular music – minor work	K. Asbjørnsen/Ø. Brandtsegg/T. Dahl (Krøyt)	Silent from the EP Body Electric
Contemporary music – minor work	Jon Øivind Ness	The Dangerous kitten
Contemporary music – major work	John Persen	Over kors og krone
Music for another art form	Henrik Hellstenius	Sera
Lyrics	Øystein Sunde	Folk til slikt

=== 2001 ===
Category	Performer	Title
Popular music – open class	Lars A. Sandness/Jørgen Nordeng (Tungtvann)	Nord og ned
Popular music – minor work	Odd Nordstoga	Bie på deg
Music for another art form	Geir Bøhren & Bent Åserud	4 høytider
Lyrics	Paal-Helge Haugen	The Maid of Norway
Contemporary music, big musician crew	Ragnhild Berstad	Emutatio
Contemporary music, small musician crew	Sven Lyder Kahrs	Ein Hauch um nichts

=== 2002 ===
Category	Performer	Title
Popular music – rock	Janove Ottesen & Geir Zahl (Kaizers)	Ompa til du dør
Popular music – minor work	Kari Iveland & Hilde Heltberg	Med tiden
Lyrics	Esben Selvig & Aslak Rakli Hartberg (Klovner i Kamp)	Nattens sønner
Music Pedagogics works	Bertil Palmar Johansen	Tors Hammer
Contemporary music	Nils Henrik Asheim	Chase
Musical Drama	Roger Ludvigsen	Ayra-Leena

=== 2003 ===
Category	Performer	Title
Music for winds	Knut Vaage	Graffiti
Contemporary music	Lasse Thoresen	Løp, lokk og linjer
Popular music	Thomas Dybdahl	All's Not Lost
Music in the borderland	Sinikka Langeland	Runoja
Lyrics	Kjartan Fløgstad	Slak line

=== 2004 ===
Category	Performer	Title
Popular music	Even Johansen (Magnet)	The Day We Left Town
Contemporary music	Lars Petter Hagen	Passage – silence and light triptych
Music for another art form	Åsmund Feidje	Keiser og galileer
Vokal Music	Torbjørn Dyrud	Lovesongs
Lyrics	Erik Bye	Men når regnet en gang kommer
Electro-acoustic, electronica and installation	Natasha Barrett	Agora
Open class	Maja Solveig Kjelstrup Ratkje	No Title Performance and Sparkling Water

=== 2005 ===
Category	Performer	Title
Popular music	Martin Hagfors/Lars Horntveth/Martin Horntveth (The National Bank)	«Tolerate»
Contemporary music	Ragnhild Berstad	Recludo
Traditional music	Jorun Marie Kvernberg	Då kom du
Music for another art form	Sverre Indris Joner	Tanghost
Church Music	Jan Gunnar Hoff	Meditatus

=== 2006 ===
Category	Performer	Title
Popular music	Arne Nordheim	FONOS
Popular music	Kjartan Kristiansen (DumDum Boys)	Enhjørning
Open class	Gisle Kverndokk	Den fjerde nattevakt

=== 2007 ===
Category	Performer	Title
Contemporary music	Asbjørn Schaathun	Double Portrait – for violin, large ensemble and live electronics
Popular music	Gaute Storaas	The music of children's film and TV series Elias
Lyrics	Bjørn Eidsvåg	«Floden» from the album Nåde
Open class	Terje Isungset	The album Igloo

=== 2008 ===
Category	Performer	Title
Contemporary music	Rolf Wallin	Strange News
Popular music	Anne Grete Preus	The album Om igjen for første gang
Lyrics	Arne Moslåtten	The album Spissrotgang
Open class	Alfred Janson	En bibelhistorie for an actor and 15 musicians

It was not awarded a prize for 2009.

=== 2010 ===
Category	Performer	Title
Contemporary music	Klaus Sandvik	Prime Preparation
Popular music	Bent Sæther/Hans Magnus Ryan (Motorpsycho)	Child of the Future
Lyrics	Kari Bremnes	The album Ly
Open class	Nils Petter Molvær	The album Hamada

=== 2011 ===
Category	Performer	Title
Contemporary music	Ketil Hvoslef	Octopus Rex
Popular music	Susanne Sundfør	The Brothel
Lyrics	Vigdis Hjorth	The Libretto of Med kniven på strupen
Open class	Johan Sara Jr.	Transmission – Rievdadus

=== 2012 ===
Category	Performer	Title
Contemporary music	Ørjan Matre	Inside Out – concerto for clarinet and orchestra
Popular music	Maria Mena	Viktoria
Lyrics	Lars Vaular	Du betyr meg
Open class	Kjell Samkopf	Burragorangian Stones

=== 2013 ===
Category	Performer	Title
Contemporary music	Jan Erik Mikalsen	Parts II For Orchestra
Popular music	Peder Losnegård (LidoLido)	Pretty Girls And Grey Sweaters
Lyrics	Ragnar Olsen	Querini – En Opera Fra Røst
Open class	Helge Sunde and Ensemble Denada	Windfall

=== 2014 ===
Category	Performer	Title
Contemporary music	Magnar Åm	Inngang, Nærver, Utgang (Consert for Viola and Strings)
Popular music	Gabrielle Leithaug	Nattergal
Lyrics	Stein Torleif Bjella	Heim For Å Døy
Open class	Christian Blom	Trio for Dancing Thread, Lightbulb and Bell With Damper
This years Challenger	Hilde Marie Kjersem	If We Make It To The Future

=== 2015 ===
Category	Performer	Title
Popular music	Jarle Bernhoft	Islander
Contemporary music	Eivind Buene	Blue Mountain
Lyrics	OnklP	«Styggen på ryggen»
Open class	Tuva Syvertsen and Erik Sollid (Valkyrien Allstars)	Farvel Slekt Og Venner
This years Challenger	Thea Hjelmeland	Solar Plexus

=== 2016 ===
Category	Performer	Title
Popular music	Amund Maarud	Volt
Contemporary music	Olav Berg	Konsert for bratsj og orkester
Lyrics	Jeff Wasserman	«Promised Land»
Open class	Morten Qvenild	Personal Piano
This years Challenger	Fay Wildhagen	«Into the Woods»

=== 2017 ===
Category	Performer	Title
Popular music	Marit Larsen	Joni Was Right
Contemporary music	Øyvind Torvund	Sweet Pieces
Open class	Susanna Wallumrød	Triangle
This years Challenger	Cashmere Cat	Collected production in 2016
Lyrics	Karpe Diem	Heisann Montebello
