= Oslo Sinfonietta =

Norwegian contemporary classical orchestra

Oslo Sinfonietta is a Norwegian contemporary classical orchestra. It was founded by composer Asbjørn Schaatun in 1986. The current artistic director is Christian Eggen.

Oslo Sinfonietta grew out of contemporary music circles at the Norwegian Academy of Music. Since 1993 it has been organised as a pool of musicians drawn from the Oslo Philharmonic Orchestra, the Norwegian National Opera and Ballet Orchestra, the Norwegian Radio Orchestra and the local freelance scene. Oslo Sinfonietta showcases important works composed during the 20th and 21st centuries and has commissioned and premièred a number of new works by both Norwegian and foreign composers.

Oslo Sinfonietta is one of the founders of the Ultima Oslo Contemporary Music Festival.

In 1999, the Oslo Sinfonietta won the Spellemannprisen award for the album "Boyl" with music by Rolf Wallin.

Oslo Sinfonietta performs regularly in Norway and abroad, fx. The Casa da Música Festival in Porto, The Présence Festival in Paris, Huddersfield Contemporary Music Festival, New Music Dublin, Darmstadt Summer Courses for New Music and The Venice Biennale.

== Discography ==
- Oslo Sinfonietta (Aurora, 1993)
- Rolf Wallin: Move (Hemera, 1994)
- Asbjørn Schaathun: Actions, Interpolations & Analyses (Aurora, 1995)
- Cecilie Ore: Codex Temporis (Aurora, 1996)
- John Persen: Recycles Encore/Arvesøl (Hemera, 1997)
- Åse Hedstrøm: Flow (Aurora, 1998)
- Rolf Wallin: Boyl (Aurora, 1999)
- Jon Øivind Ness: Dandy Garbage (Aurora, 1999)
- Bent Sørensen:Birds and Bells (ECM, 1999)
- Bendik Hagerup, Trond Reinholdsen, Eivind Buene, Lars Petter Hagen, Maja Ratkje: Faces (Albedo, 2000)
- Magne Hegdal: Annotations (Aurora, 2000)
- Eivind Buene: Objects of Desire (Albedo, 2000)
- Maja Ratkje: River Echoes (Tzadik, 2006)
- Alfred Janson: A Bible Story (Grappa, 2009)
- Simon Steen-Andersen: Black Box Music (DaCapo Records, 2014)
- Arne Nordheim, Ørjan Matre, Jon Øivind Ness: Snarks in the kitchen (Aurora, 2015)
- Maja S. K. Ratkje: And sing...
- Per Nørgård, Helmut Lachenmann, Alfred Janson, Kaija Saariaho, Iannis Xenakis: As dreams (BIS, 2016)
- Olav Anton Thommessen: The hermaphrodite (Aurora, 2016)
