= Ragnhild Berstad =

Norwegian composer

Ragnhild Berstad (born in Oslo in 1956) is a Norwegian contemporary composer.

== Career ==
Berstad started her musical career as a guitarist and music teacher. She later studied music theory at the University of Oslo and composition with Lasse Thoresen and Olav Anton Thommessen at the Norwegian State Academy of Music, where she received her diploma in 1997.

Berstad's works have seen performances at a number of festivals at home and abroad including the 1997 ISCM World Music Days in Seoul with her work Respiro, the 1999 Ultima Oslo Contemporary Music Festival with the work Toreuma, NYC in 1998 with the work Focus! as well as the 1998 Bourges Festival for Electro-acoustic Music and the International Rostrum of Composers in Paris and Numus in Aarhus in the same year. In 2012 Berstad premiered a new orchestral work Requiem performed by the Norwegian Soloists’ Choir and Oslo Camerata at the Oslo International Church Music Festival. 2014 saw Berstad's work Cardinem performed by the Klangforum Wien at the Ultima Oslo Contemporary Music Festival. The work was commissioned by Klangforum Wien as part of the orchestra's Giacinto Scelsi Revisited-project. The work also saw performances the same year at the Transart festival in Bolzano and at the Dresdner Festival der Zeitgenössichen Musik.

== Production ==
=== Selected works ===
- Origo for String Quartet and Double Bass (1991)
- Gjenklang (1991)
- Verto (1992)
- Hvordan kamelen fikk sin pukkel (1992)
- Hvordan hvalen fikk sin trange hals (1993)
- Liljing (1993)
- Mellom før og etter (1993)
- Respiro for Amplified Clarinet and Tape (1994)
- Krets (1996)
- Toreuma (1997)
- Zeugma (1997)
- Fragmenta metamorphoseon (1998)
- Emutatio (1999)
- Cresco (2001)
- Recludo (2003)
- Quaero – tilblivelse (2006)
- Etiam Nunc (2006)
- In Vitro (modus 2) (2008)
- Téla (2011)
- Requiem (2012)
- Cardinem (2014)
- xtendõ (2016)

=== Discography ===
- Kjell Tore Innervik, A migrant in the new (2009)
- Arditti String Quartet, Ultima Arditti (2004)
- Respiro, ACD 5021 (2003)
- Tanja Orning, Victoria Johnsen, Kyberia: Navigations (2000)
- BIT20 Ensemble, Stavanger Symfoniorkester, Berit Opheim, Definitely Pling Plong (1995)
- Oslo Sinfonietta, Minken Fossheim, Kim Haugen, Musikkdilla (1995)

== Prizes and awards ==
- 2001: The Edvard Prize for Emutatio
- 2005: The Edvard Prize for Recludo
- 2008: Arne Nordheim's Composer's Prize
- 2016: Nominated for the Nordic Council Music Prize for her work Cardinem
