= Øyvind Torvund =

Norwegian composer (born 1976)

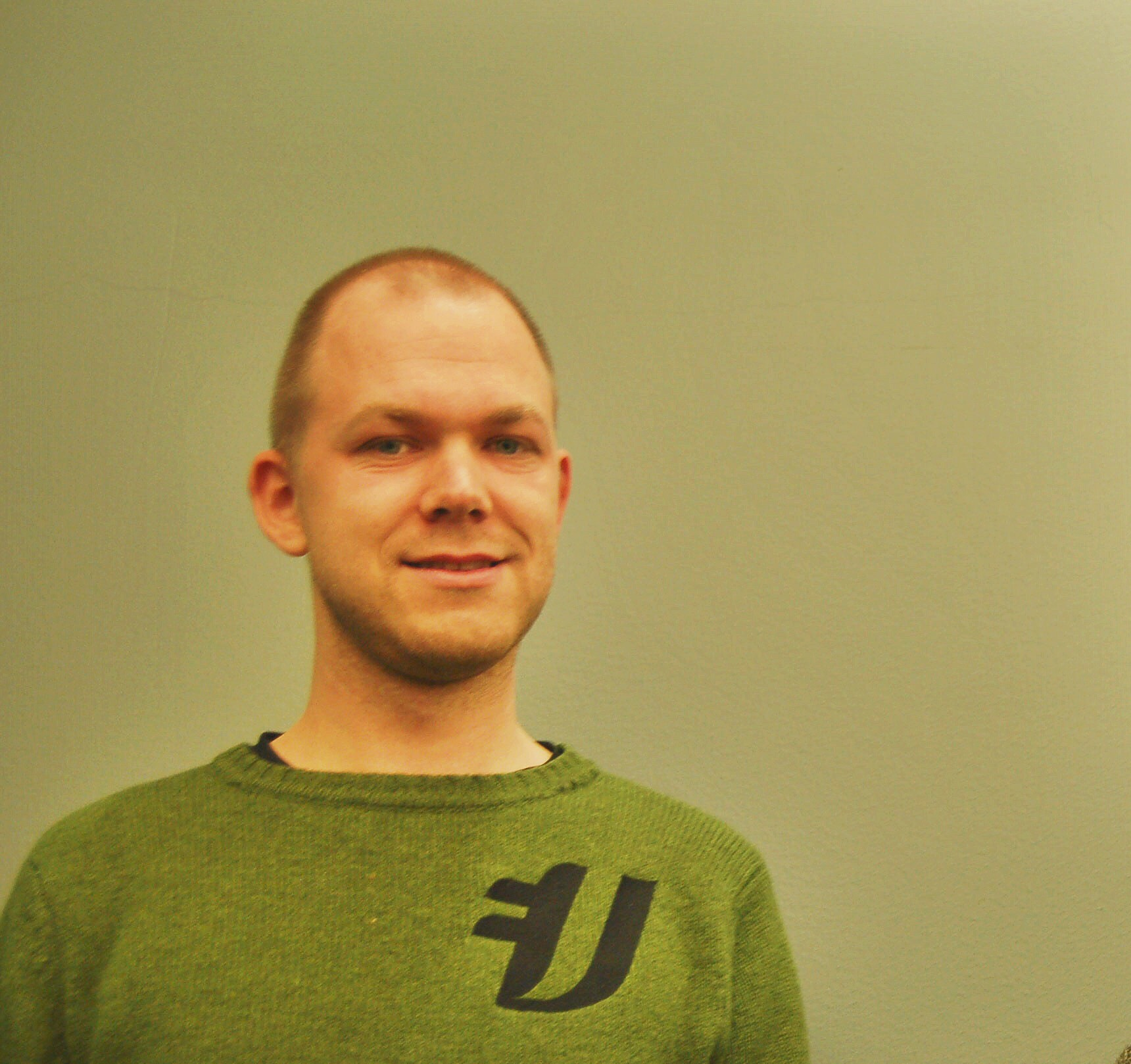
Øyvind Torvund in 2007 (photo: Tomas Lauvland Pettersen)

Øyvind Torvund (born 1976) is a Norwegian composer.

Torvund was born in Porsgrunn. He studied composition at the Norwegian Academy of Music (Oslo) with Bjørn Kruse and Ivar Frounbergand, as well as at Universität der Künste (Berlin) with Friedrich Goldmann. Equally important is his background as a guitarist in rock and improvising groups. He has ongoing relationship with groups such as asamisimasa (Norway), Oslo Sinfonietta and Plus-Minus ensemble (UK), as well as the video artist Yorgos Sapountzis.

Torvund has been a composer in residence for Oslo Sinfonietta, written pieces for ensemble Ascolta, Ensemble Zwischentöne, Trondheim Symphony Orchestra, Plus Minus ensemble and Yarn/Wire. His pieces have been performed in Donaueschinger Musiktage, MaerzMusik, Ultraschall, Ultima Oslo Contemporary Music Festival, Transit festival, Huddersfield Contemporary Music Festival, Other Minds festival and at the Darmstadt International Ferienkurse.

Key Torvund works includes "Giants of Jazz" (sax, accordion, double bass). "How Sound Travels" (orchestra), the improvisation series "Bandrom", "Tune Park" (chamber ensemble), "Wolf Studies" (sextet), "Forest Construction" (chamber ensemble), "Krull Quest" (cello, electronics) and "The Stacks " (quartertone marimba or cello and electronics).

Although some of Torvund's works, such as the Nono and Scelsi inspired orchestral piece How Sound Travels (2006), are easily located under the umbrella of contemporary classical music, many of his pieces combine sounds and concepts from other musical traditions. In Power Art (2006), for soprano, guitar and 2-stringed bass, the bass instrument is built by the performer and the piece "is reminiscent of the musical feel of hardcore power trios like Black Flag, even if a song by Henry Purcell is the piece’s foundation." In Album Cycle (2004) for 9 instruments, he "layers typical Baroque figures, the décor of garish 1980s pop, and stereotypical free jazz riffs, resulting in a tableau of musical ornamentation crossing styles and eras, oscillating between the exalted and the banal."

Torvund has created many installations, most notably the Bandrom project - "a multi-disciplinary performance event with a polyphony of independent concerts, slide-shows, installations and music situations." A Bandrom event may be realised on "one night or over several days, and in each version there is a new set-up that relates to the place and context." The core musical idea is that musicians teach each other short solo pieces "by ear" and this teaching process is shown to the spectators, usually in an informal setting with food and drink.

Torvund has also held a number of positions in various organisations on the Norwegian music scene. He served as the editor of contemporary music publication Parergon from 2001-2002, artistic director for the Music Factory festival in Bergen, co-producer at the Borealis festival (2004-2008) and artistic director for nyMusikk (the Norwegian section of the ISCM) from 2009 to 2011.

From 2007 to 2009, Torvund was selected as an entrant for the INTRO-composer launch programme, that was administered by MIC Music Information Centre Norway and Concerts Norway. In 2012 Torvund received the Arne Nordheim composer prize and in 2013 he was a DAAD-fellow in Berlin.

September 2017 saw Torvund being bestowed with the Edvard Prize in the Contemporary category for his work Sweet Pieces.

== Production ==
=== Selected works ===
==== Orchestral works ====
- Archaic Jam for orchestra with electronics (2017)
- Sweet Pieces (2016)
- Idyllic Scenes (2015)
- How Sound Travels (2006)
- Solo Plans I (2015)
- Abstraction in Folk Art (2014)
- The Stacks (2007)
- Krull quest for cello and electronics (2004)

==== Chamber ====
- Wolf Studies (2006/2014)
- Untitled School/Mud Jam/Campfire Tunes (2014)
- Plastic Waves (2013)
- Willibald Motor Landscape (2012)
- Neon Forest Space (2009

==== Sinfonietta ====
Forest Construction (2012)

=== Discography ===
- asamisimasa, Neon Forest Space - asamisimasa plays the music of Øyvind Torvund (2015)
- Bjørn Fongaard – Galaxe (2015)
- Kjell Tore Innervik, A Migrant in the New (2011)
- Concepts of Sorrows and dangers (2006)
- Tanja Orning, Cellotronics (2005)
- Håkon Thelin, A P)reference to Other Things (2004)
- Poing, Giants of Jazz (2003)
- Circulasione Totale Orchestra, Borealis (1998)

Awards
Preceded by Olav Berg	Recipient of the contemporary music Edvardprisen; 2017	Succeeded by -
