= Ørjan Matre =

Norwegian contemporary composer (born 1979)

Ørjan Matre (born 6 December 1979 in Bergen) is a Norwegian contemporary composer.

== Biography ==
Matre studied composition at the Norwegian Academy of Music from 1999 to 2005 with teachers such as Bjørn Kruse, Olav Anton Thommessen, Lasse Thoresen and Henrik Hellstenius. Matre has written music for a wide variety of settings from chamber ensembles to symphonic orchestras.

In 2011, Matre was bestowed with the Lindeman Prize for Young Musicians, and in the following year he received the Edvard Prize in the contemporary category for his clarinet concerto Inside Out. 2015 saw Matre winning the TONO Composer’s Prize at the Spellemannprisen Awards, the Norwegian equivalent to the Grammy, for the release Ørjan Matre: PreSage & Violin Concerto with Peter Herresthal and the Stavanger Symphony Orchestra.

During the 2006-2007 concert season, Matre served as the composer in residence of the Kristiansand Symphony Orchestra, and in the 2013-2014 season he was the Oslo Philharmonic Orchestra’s profile composer. From 2010 to 2012, Matre was the focal point of the Music Information Centre Norway’s INTRO-Composer – and international launch programme for young composers.

Matre’s works have been performed domestically and internationally at festivals and events including the Ultima Oslo Contemporary Music Festival, Nordic Music Days, Sound Scotland, Warsaw Autumn, Wittener Tage für neue Kammermusik, BBC Promenade Concerts and Darmstadt Ferienkurse.

== Production ==
=== Selected works ===
- 10 fanfarer for folk flest (2017)
- Orphic songs (2016)
- "...but from those flames no light..." (2015)
- Tre slåtter (og en vuggesang) fra Torshov (2014)
- Violin Concerto (2014)
- Konsert for orkester (2014)
- preSage (2013)
- Terskelsanger (2012)
- Resurgence (2011)
- Inside Out (2010)
- "...but I must have said this before" (2010)
- Crossing patterns (2009)
- Händel Mixtapes (2008)
- Atem (2007)
- A leaf falls in loneliness (2006). Premiered by Tora Augestad, Rolf Borch and Tanja Orning at the 2006 Ultima Oslo Contemporary Music Festival
- Echo Imprints (2006). Commissioned by the [Oslo Philharmonic Orchestra].
- Hunting Low and High (2006) Premiered by Staff Band of the Norwegian Armed Forces Vestlandet
- Four Miniatures for Orchestra (2005). Matre featured with his work Lights out on a release by the Norwegian Radio Orchestra
- Attempted birdhouse 2.1 (2003). Premiered by the Bergen Philharmonic Orchestra as winner of the orchestra’s competition for young composers
- Klang(!) (2002).

=== Discography ===
- Uranienborg Vokalensemble, Himmelrand (2016)
- Stavanger Symphony Orchestra, Rolf Gupta, Peter Herresthal, Henrik Hellstenius – Ørjan Matre (2015)
- Ensemble Ernst, ...But.. . (2015)
- Sverre Riise, Snarks in the kitchen (2015)
- The Norwegian Soloists’ Choir, Rós - Songs of Christmas (2013)
- Ila Brass Band, Klang (2012)
- Rolf Borch, Inside Out (2012)
- Twitter Machine, Crossing Patterns (2011)
- Kristian Lindberg, The Blank Spaces (2010)
- Norwegian Radio Orchestra, Rolf Gupta, Lights Out (2006)

Awards
Preceded by Ketil Hvoslef	Recipient of the contemporary music Edvardprisen; 2012	Succeeded by Jan Erik Mikalsen
Preceded by Ingrid Helene Håvik	Recipient of the composer Spellemannprisen; 2015	Succeeded by Gjermund Larsen
