= Lars Petter Hagen =

Norwegian composer (born 1975)

Lars Petter Hagen (born 2 August 1975) is a Norwegian contemporary composer, former director of the Ultima Oslo Contemporary Music Festival and currently an adviser for the Oslo Philharmonic Orchestra.

== Biography ==
Hagen studied at the Norwegian Academy of Music, and has written instrumental works, electro-acoustic pieces as well as music for film and theatre.

2003 saw Hagen bestowed with the Arne Nordheim’s Composer Prize and in 2004 he received the Edvard Prize in the contemporary music category. He received a 2013 Spellemannprisen Award in the Composer category for a release with the Oslo Philharmonic, Rolf Gupta and Gjermund Larsen featuring his works. Hagen has also served as artistic director for Ny Musikk (the Norwegian section of the ISCM) and festivals Happy Days, Nordic Music Days and the Ultima Oslo Contemporary Music Festival. Hagen was appointed as permanent artistic director for the Ultima Festival in 2012, after having held the position on a temporary basis in 2009 and 2010.

2010 saw Hagen being nominated for a Drama Desk Award for his music composed for NYC-based theatre production company Wakka Wakka Productions’ show Baby Universe. 2012 saw Hagen releasing the album Elements of Light with German electronica producer Pantha du Prince and ensemble The Bell Laboratory.

== Production ==
=== Chamber music ===
- 3 Transfigurations for String Quartet (2017)
- The NVS Notebook, premiered at the Eclat Festival in 2011 by the Neue Vocalsolisten Stuttgart
- Lyric Structures, premiered in 2008 by the Collegium Novum Zurich
- Into Johannesburg, commissioned work for Ensemble Modern and Siemens Arts Program, premiered in Frankfurt in 2008
- Hymn, commissioned work for bassist Dan Styffe
- Seven Studies, electro-acoustic work premiered at the Dark Music Days, Reykjavík in 2005
- Concept of Sorrows and Dangers, commissioned work written for Rolf-Erik Nystrøm, premiered at the Kulturkirken Jakob, Oslo i 2001
- W: In Memory Of: (Subjects), commissioned work written for Lars Erik ter-Jung and Thomas Kjekstad, premiered in 2002
- Max F: Passage, commissioned work written for Cikada Ensemble, premiered at the Maerzmusik, Berliner Festspiele in 2003
- Lumiere, espace et vertes, work for saxophone, accordion and double bass, premiered by Poing in 2002

=== Orchestral works ===
- To Zeitblom, commissioned work for SWR written for Hardanger Fiddle and orchestra, premiered at the 2011 Donaueshinger Musiktage
- The Artist's Despair Before the Grandeur of Ancient Ruins, commissioned work written for the Oslo Philharmonic, premiered at the Oslo Concert Hall in 2011
- Funeral March for Edvard Grieg, commissioned work for the Bergen Philharmonic Orchestra, premiered in Bergen in 2007
- Understemmer, six installations for wind ensemble, premiered in Kolbotn, Norway in 2006
- Norwegian Archives, commissioned work for SWR, premiered by Hilversum Radio Chamber Orchestra during the 2005 Donaueshinger Musiktage
- Tveitt-Fragments, commissioned work written for the Norwegian Chamber Orchestra, premiered during the Nordland Musikkfestuke in Bodø, Norway in 2006

=== Stage productions ===
- Stage work written for the 2015 performance of Hamlet by the Trøndelag Teater] – recorded by the Trondheim Symphony Orchestra
- Works written for producer Henriette Pedersen's productions Animal Magnetism 1, Animal Magnetism 2, The Problem has no Name, Hamburger Allee, Small Stick, Big Bird and Blindt Begjær
- Works written for NYC-based theatre production company Wakka Wakka Productions’ shows Saga, Baby Universe (A Puppet Odyssey), Fabrik: The Legend of M. Rabinowitz and The Death of Little Ibsen
- Collaborations with Goksøyr & Martens for a number of productions, including the documentary opera This Is No Dream premiered in Johannesburg in 2008
- Tynset Project, Bak lengste mil, 2006

=== Sound installations ===
- Archive Fever, live-installation for small ensemble, electronics, visuals. Commissioned by Internationales Musikinstitut Darmstadt (2016)
- Batterie Sonique, sound installation located at coastal fortification Karljohansvern commissioned by The Norwegian Defence Estates Agency, unveiled in 2011
- Silent Places, commissioned work for video, clarinet and autobiographical soundtrack premiered at the Music Factory Festival in Bergen in 2003
- Sharing Silence, sound installation, premiered at the UKS Biennale in Oslo in 2004

=== Discography ===
- Håkon Thelin, Folk, featured work on the release: Hymn (2015)
- Ingrid Andsnes, 33+1, featured work on the release: Diabelli Cadenza - for piano and EBow (2015)
- Lars Petter Hagen & the Oslo Philharmonic Orchestra, featured work on the release: The Artist's Despair Before the Grandeur of Ancient Ruins, To Zeitblom – Concerto for Hardanger Fiddle and Orchestra, Norwegian Archives, Tveitt-Fragments and Funeral March over Edvard Grieg (2013)
- Donaueschinger Musiktage 2011 (NEOS 11214-16) - featured work on the release: Zeitblom (2011)
- Dan Styffe, Bass Trip, featured work on the release: Hymn (2008)
- Rolf-Erik Nystrøm, Cikada, Christian Eggen, Maja Ratkje, Concepts of Sorrows and Dangers, featured work on the release: Concepts of Sorrows and Dangers (2006)
- Poing, Planet Poing, featured work on the release: Kronologi (2005)
- Donaueschinger Musiktage 2005 vol.3 (Col Legno WWE 1CD 20246) - featured work on the release: Norske Archives (2005)
- Amund Sjølie Sveen, Erik Dæhlin Schwensen, Works by Barrett, Hagen, Buene, Aagaard-Nilsen, Apollyon, featured work on the release: Langsam (2004)
- Oslo Sinfonietta, Faces, featured work on the release: Nudes. Nudes 3.1b, Collage (Moments, Highlights), Nudes 1.1 og Nudes 2.0 (2000)

Awards
Preceded by Eivind Buene	Recipient of the Spellemannprisen composer award 2013	Succeeded by Ingrid Helene Håvik
