= Åse Hedstrøm =

Norwegian contemporary composer (born 1950)

Åse Hedstrøm (born 17 April 1950 in Moss) is a Norwegian contemporary composer.

== Life and career ==
Åse Hedstrøm studied music at the Institute of Sonology in Utrecht, and composition at the Norwegian State Academy of Music. She continued her studies in Stockholm with composer Sven-David Sandström.

After completing her studies, Hedstrøm received a three-year working grant from the state in 1987, and began composing full-time. She received the Norwegian Society of Composers' Work of the Year award for the chamber music work Right After in 1985 and for the string quartet Sorti in 1989.

Parallel to her compositional career, Hedstrøm has also been active as an organizer and coordinator on the Norwegian music scene, beginning in 1978 when she was appointed as director for NyMusikk (the Norwegian section of ISDM). I the time-frame 1983 to 1987, Hedstrøm was the music co-ordinator for Henie Onstad Kunstsenter which resulted in a number of contemporary music concerts and festivals at the art centre. From 1994 to 1998, Hedstrøm served as director and artistic leader for the Ultima Oslo Contemporary Music Festival. From 1999 to 2002, Hedstrøm was the director of the Stockholm Concert Hall and the Royal Stockholm Philharmonic Orchestra. She has served as a member of a number of boards and advisory committees, including a stint as chairwoman of the board for MIC Music Information Centre Norway, chair of collecting society TONO’s board 2009-2011 and from 2012 to 2016 chair of the board for the Norwegian Society of Composers.

Hedstrøm is a member of Sweden’s Kungliga Musikaliska Akademien.

== Production ==
=== Selected works ===
- Faser for orchestra (1979/80)
- Through for mezzo-soprano, trombone, percussion and tape (1983)
- Chain for piano solo (1983)
- Anima for orchestra (1983/84)
- Right after for flute, clarinet, violin, cello and piano (1984/85)
- Nenia for orchestra (1985/86)
- Grata for flute, violin, viola, cello, harp and piano (1986)
- Sorti for string quartet (1987)
- Saisir for chamber orchestra (1987/88)
- Signs and pictures for piano solo (1989)
- Sug for percussion quartet and symphonic wind orchestra (1989/90)
- Flow for marimba solo (1990)
- Bewegt for sinfonietta (1990)
- Voci for sinfonietta (1991)
- Flores for piano and string orchestra (1992)
- Cantos for orchestra (1993)
- …e quindi uscimmo a riveder le stelle for orchestra (1994)
- Touche for double bass solo (1996)
- Favola for orchestra (1997)
- Terra for sinfonietta (1998)
- In memoriam for recorder solo (2004)
- Vsprs for violin, viola and cello (2007)
- In Solitude', for Company for violin solo (2008)
- Runner’s Blues for symphonic wind ensemble (2012)
- Imprint for viola bastarda (2016)

=== Discography ===
- Elisabeth Klein, Mysterious Mountains, Norwegian Piano Music, Works by Bakke, Fongaard, Strømholm, Hedstrøm, Haug, Slettholm, Mortensen, Maj Sønstevold. Featured work: Chain (1983).
- Cikada, Plays: Wallin, Hedstrøm, Ore, Persen. Featured work: Sorti (1987).
- Oslo Sinfonietta, Christian Eggen, Plays: Berge, Thommessen, Wallin, Hedstrøm, Nordheim. Featured work: Saisir (1988)
- Hans-Kristian Kjos Sørensen, Open percussion , Works by Xenakis, Cage, Hedstrøm, Donatoni, Wallin, Kjos Sørensen. Featured work: Flow (1990).
- Bjørn Ianke - The Contemporary Solo Double Bass, vol. 3, Works by Nordheim, Hedstrøm, Xenakis, Hellstenius. Featured work: Touche (1996).
- Åse Hedstrøm Flow, Oslo Sinfonietta / Christian Eggen, dirigent/Håkon Austbø, piano/Tomas Nilsson, marimba - Featured work: Saisir (1988) for sinfonietta, Chain (1983) for piano, Flores (1992) for piano and string orchestra, Voci (1991) for sinfonietta, Flow (1990) for marimba, Bewegt (1990) for sinfonietta (1998)
- BIT20 Ensemble, Nordic music for Chamber Orchestra, Works by Sørensen, Hauksson, Hedstrøm, Mossenmark, Heininen, Tanaka. Featured work: Terra (1998).
