= Persen =

Persen is a surname and may refer to:

- John Persen (1941–2014), Norwegian composer
- Mari Boine Persen (born) 1956), Norwegian Sami musician
- Synnøve Persen (born 1950), Norwegian Sami poet and artist
