= Jon Øivind Ness =

Norwegian composer

Jon Øivind Ness (born 30 March 1968) is a Norwegian contemporary composer.

== Career ==
During his career, Ness won a 1994 prize from the Norwegian Society of Composers. During the 2000s, he was a two-time winner of the Edvard Prize and a one time Spellemannprisen winner. For the 2012–2013 concert season, Ness was selected as the Oslo Philharmonic Orchestra’s profile composer.

== Production ==
=== Selected works ===
- Mumpsimus (2017)
- p.p.w.e.i. (2016)
- Ætscæke (2015)
- The Shoots (2014)
- Marmæle (2014)
- Mørkgånga (2014)
- Mjær (2013)
- My Bloody Mudfish (2013)
- 5 arrangements for Diamanda Galas and orchestra (2012)
- Jønjiljo (2012)
- An den langen Lüssen (2010)
- Low Jive (2007)
- Fierce Kentucky Mothers of Doom (2005)
- Dangerous Kitten (1998)
- Dandy Garbage (1993)
- Schatten (1992)

=== Discography ===
- Sverre Riise, Snarks in the kitchen, featured works: The Dangerous Kitten – for trombone, 3 clarinets and sinfonietta, Moray (The Piece Formerly Known as Phekph Piphtolph) (2015)
- Sverre Riise, Marius Hesby, Magnus Loddgard, Thomas Kjekstad, KORK, Fierce Kentucky Mothers of Doom (2013)
- Ernst Simon Glaser, Zvezdochka in Orbit (2012)
- Peter Herresthal, Catch Light, featured work, Mad Cap Tootlin (2011)
- Twitter Machine, Crossing Patterns (2011)
- Trondheim Sinfonietta, Snowblind (2011)
- Oslo Philharmonic Orchestra, Low Jive (2009)
- Dan Styffe, Bass Trip (2008)
- Arditti Quartet, Ultima Arditti, vol.1, featured work Beware of Darkness (2004)
- MiN Ensemblet, Party Music – Works by Adderley / Harvey / Hellstenius / Ness (2004)
- Stavanger Samtidsensemble, 1-2-3 Happy Happy Happy (2001)
- Saxofon Concentus, Saxofon Concentus (2000)
- Kyberia, Navigations (1999)
- Oslo Sinfonietta, Trondheim Symphony Orchestra, Christian Eggen, Dandy Garbage (1999)
- BIT20 Ensemble, Absolute Pling-Plong – Eight Ways of Making Music (1995)
