= Henrik Hellstenius =

Norwegian composer and musicologist

Henrik Hellstenius (born 28 April 1963) is a Norwegian composer and musicologist.

Born in Bærum, Norway, Hellstenius studied musicology at the University of Oslo and composition with Lasse Thoresen, Olav Anton Thommessen and Bjørn Kruse at the Norwegian Academy of Music in Oslo. He studied in 1992–1993 with Gérard Grisey at the Conservatoire National Supérieur de Musique et de Danse de Paris in Paris, and he also studied computer-supported composition at IRCAM.

Hellstenius is currently professor in composition and music theory at the Norwegian Academy of Music.

Hellstenius’ compositional output spans a wide stylistic field, including opera, chamber music, orchestral works, electro-acoustic music and scores for theatre, film and ballet. His works have seen performances throughout the Nordics, Russia, Australia, the U.S., Canada, England, Scotland, Greece, Estonia, Lithuania, Latvia, Poland, Germany, France, Holland and Japan. His works have been featured at festivals such as the Bourges Festival for electro-acoustic music in France, the International Rostrum for Composers in Paris, the DUT-festival in Copenhagen, Nordic Music Days and the ULTIMA Oslo Contemporary Music Festival, performed by ensembles Cikada, Oslo Sinfonietta, BIT20 Ensemble and Ensemble Court Circuit.

Hellstenius has also penned scores for a number of stage productions. In addition to his two operas, Sera and Ophelias: Death by Water Singing – both premiered at the ULTIMA Oslo Contemporary Music Festival and later performed in Poland and Germany – Hellstenius has also worked closely with playwrights Jon Fosse, Cecilie Løveid, Liv Heløe as well as choreographer Ingun Bjørnsgaard.

Hellstenius is also focusing on other forms of stage productions including instrumental theatre or staged concerts. An example of this compositional practice is the project Ørets Teater I.IV, premiered at the 2011 Bergen International Festival, for which Hellstenius was composer in residence. Following its premiere, the work was adapted and rewritten for a 2015 ULTIMA Oslo Contemporary Music Festival performance. For the 2014/2015 concert season, Hellstenius was the Oslo Philharmonic Orchestra’s profile composer.

Hellstenius’ works are published by Edition Wilhelm Hansen/The Music Sales Group.

== Production ==
=== Selected works ===
- Rift for string trio (2017)
- Unfolded, as it were a piano trio (2017)
- Instrument of Speech (2017)
- Up and away for string orchestra (2017)
- Rock Crystal for 2 sopranos, baritone and sinfonietta (2015)
- Petites Machines for orchestra (2015)
- Loven for mezzo-soprano, narrator and orchestra (2014)
- Places of Sounds and Words for soprano and ensemble (2014)
- In Memoriam - violin Concerto No 2 for solo violin, percussion and string orchestra (2012)
- Ørets teater (2011)
- Self portrait in bright light for narrator for clarinet and string quartet (2010)
- Breathings: for chamber orchestra (2009)
- Places of Sound (2008)
- Spintop Music (2008)
- Like objects in a dark room (2007)
- Ophelias : Death by water singing - Opera, libretto: Cecilie Løveid (2005)
- Ombra della sera - For percussion and double bass (2004)
- Readings of Mr. G. - For String Orchestra and Solo Percussion (2003)
- Between Two : For Guitar and Violin (2002)
- Book of Songs I Innhold: Violin Solo I; Violin Solo II; Cello Solo (2002)
- Book of Songs II: Five Duos for Violin and Cello Innhold: First Song, Second Song, Third Song, Fourth Song, FifthSong (2002)
- Book of Soongs III (2002)
- Concerto for Ensemble and Orchestra (2002)
- By the Voice a Faint Light is Shed - Concerto for Violin and Ensemble (2001)
- Songs From the Outside - For Ensemble (2001)
- Imprints - For String Trio (2000)
- Lyd – en lyd - For alto or mezzosoprano and piano (2000)
- Pour Gerard Grisey : For Piano and Percussion (2000/2004)
- Sera : Opera in One Act - libretto: Axel Hellstenius (1999/2003)
- Theatre of Sleep - For Orchestra (1999-2000)
- Framing Time (1999)
- Four Fragments - For 6 Voices (1999)
- Essais sur le temps double - For Doublebass Solo (1998)
- Five Imprints of Time III - For Harpsichord Solo (1998)
- Five Imprints of Time II - For Percussion Trio (1997)
- The Golden Shield - For Viola and Piano (1996)
- Fem avtrykk av tiden - For saxofon Quartet (1994)
- Ricercare - for Cello and Tape (1994)
- Long Pilgrimage (1994)
- Stirrings Still for Six Instrumentalists (1992/93)
- Tre bevegelser - For String Orchestra (1991)
- Søkk : A Piece for Accordion and Tape (1990)
- skal skje / Det / har skjedd (1990)

==== Scores composed for theatre performances ====
- 2006: Jon Fosse: Rambuku, Det norske teatret, Oslo
- 2005: Liv Heløe: Lise L., Nationaltheatret, Oslo
- 2000: Jon Fosse: Besøk, Den Nationale Scene, Bergen
- 1999: Jon Fosse: Draum om Hausten, Nationaltheatret, Oslo
- 1998: Peter Handke: Timen Den Nationale Scene, Bergen
- 1996: Jon Fosse: Barnet Nationatheatret, Oslo

=== Discography ===
- Nordsending - Nordic String Trios (2017)
- Elisabeth Holmertz, Tora Augestad, Ivan Lundlow, Ebba Rydh, Janna Wettergren, Sije Aker Johnsen, Christian Eggen og Cikada Ensemble - Ophelias: Death By Water Singing (2016)
- Marianne Beate Kielland og Nils Anders Mortensen - The new Song (2016)
- Hans-Kristian Kjos Sørensen – Hearing This (2016)
- Stavanger Symphony Orchestra – In Memoriam (2015)
- Peter Herresthal – Catch Light (2011)
- Readings of Mr.G (2008)
- Dan Styffe: Bass Trip (2008)
- Sigyn Fossnes: Tigthrope Walker (2005)
- Aage Kvalbein: Norwegian Short Stories (2005)
- Tanja Orning: Cellotronics (2005)
- MiNensemblet: Party Music (2004)
- Bjørn Ianke: The contemporary solo double bass, vol 3 (2003)
- Thomas Kjekstad/Lars Erik Ter Jung: Twitter machine (2003)
- Sisu: Scratch! (2003)
- BIT20 Ensemble, Pierre-André Valade: Sera (2001)
- Kyberia: Navigations (2001)
- Saxophone Concentus: Second Tale (2000)
- BIT20 Ensemble,: Absolute pling plong: Eight ways of making music (1995)
- Barratt Due’s Junior Orchestra - Asheim, Kraggerud, Grieg, Hellstenius (1995)
