= Bertil Palmar Johansen =

Norwegian contemporary composer and violinist

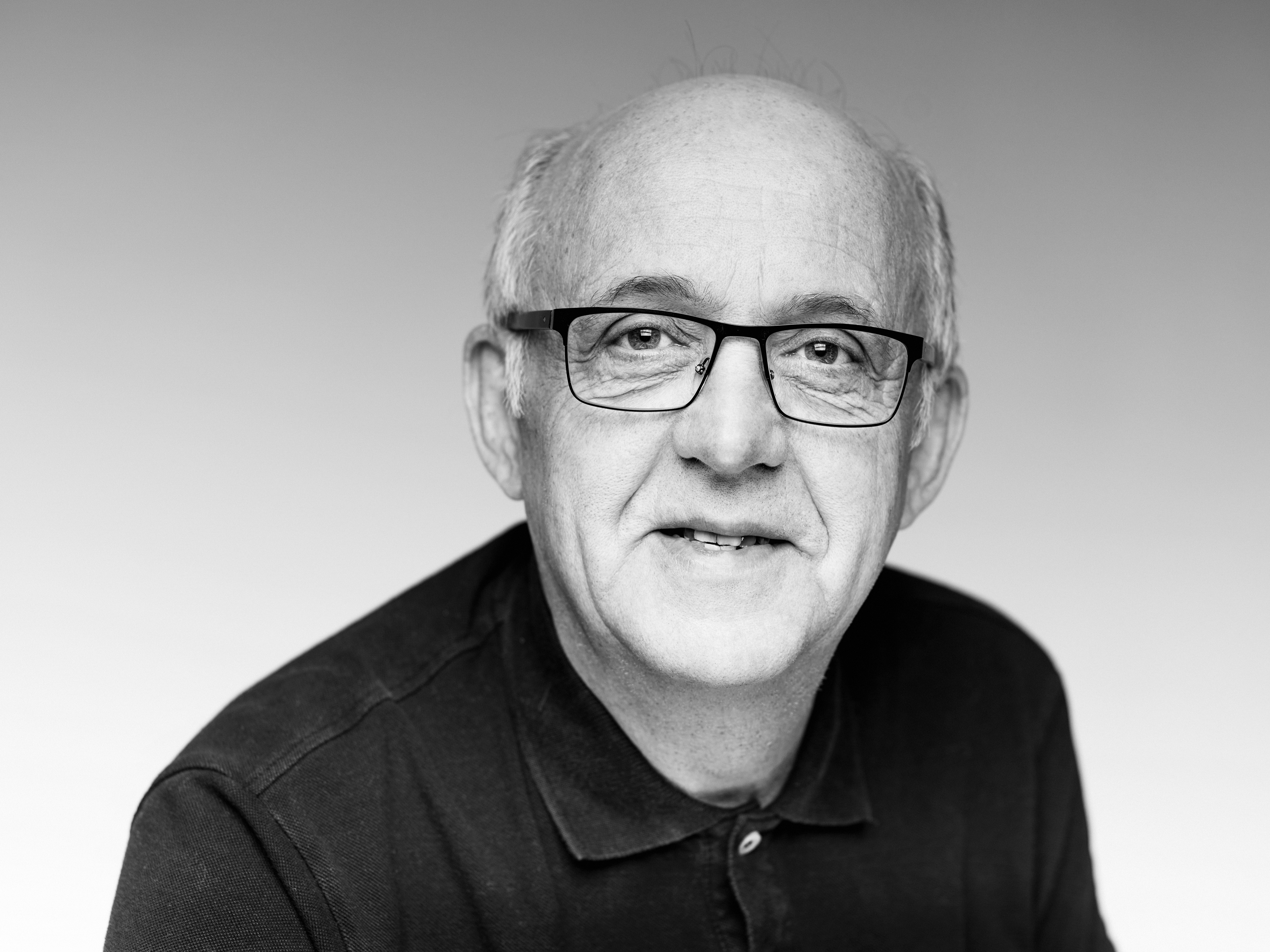
Bertil Palmar Johansen

Bertil Palmar Johansen (born 18 February 1954) is a Norwegian contemporary composer and violinist.

Johansen was born in Brattvåg. He studied violin at the Trøndelag Music Conservatory (today the NTNU) and took composition classes with Per Hjort Albertsen, Holger Prytz and Olav Anton Thommessen. His list of works spans a wide spectrum of styles and instrumentation and includes a number of commissioned works for domestic as well as international ensembles and soloists.

Key works includes his ballet Tiden Bygger Byen written for the Trondheim Symphony Orchestra, the oratory De varme vinder as well as the symphonic work Tors Hammer – a work that earned him the 2002 Edvardprisen. In 2000, his opera Hjerter Dame til Ringve saw its premiere as part of the millennial celebration. Other major works written in recent years includes Johansen's opera Madonna Furiosa, premiered in Nidarosdomen in 2005 and 2010's major scenic work Drømmen og Ilden, premiered at the Trondheim Chamber Music Festival. 2010 marked the Kristiansund premiere of a new opera, Med Kniven På Strupen, a work that was later performed at the Norwegian National Opera and Ballet. 2012 saw the premiere of the opera Den Unge Pilegrim, written for the 50th anniversary of Trondheim's Olavsfestdagene festival. Palmar Johansen's most recent projects includes works Into Whiteness, Lost Memory and My running rat – an art-science project produced in partnership with Nobel Prize laureate May-Britt Moser, the Trondheim Soloists and filmmaker Johan-Magnus Elvemo.

Palmar Johansen has also been active in various music organisations and has been a board member for Ny Musikk (the Norwegian section of the ISCM) and Nordlyd – Trondheim Contemporary Music Festival.

== Production ==
=== Selected works ===
- Hjerter Dame til Ringve
- Tiden bygger byen (1997), ballet
- Liebeslied (1989), for orchestra
- Cantilena (1987/03) for chamber orchestra
- Concertino di rosso tinto (1993/94) for violin solo and string orchestra
- Chili String (1994, revidert 2003/2004) for string orchestra
- Pizz.a Pepperoni (1996, revidert 2003) for string orchestra
- Med kniven på strupen (2010)
- Drømmen og Ilden (2010)
- Den Unge Pilegrim (2012)
- SeaTime (2014)
- Nå Ingenting To (2015)
- Into Whiteness (2017)

=== Discography ===
- Strings, Cikada (1999)
- On a spring string, Trondheim unge strykere (2000)
- Bertil Palmar Johansen, Juniorsolistene (2003)
- AS Røverkjøp, Luftforsvarets Musikkorps (2006)
- «Konsert for to fioliner og strykere», CD: The Trondheim Soloists (2001)
- «Cantus for solo blokkfløyte», CD: New Church Music from the Nidaros Cathedral, Trondheim (1993)
- «Høstscener for blåsekvintett», CD: Trondheim Wind Quintet (1989)
- «Variasjoner for fiolin solo», CD: Bjarne Fiskum (2000)
- «Bølgens ansikt», CD: 10 Bilder - NTNU. Soloist Tom Cato Amundsen, accordion
