= Dag Spantell =

Norwegian singer (1950–2025)

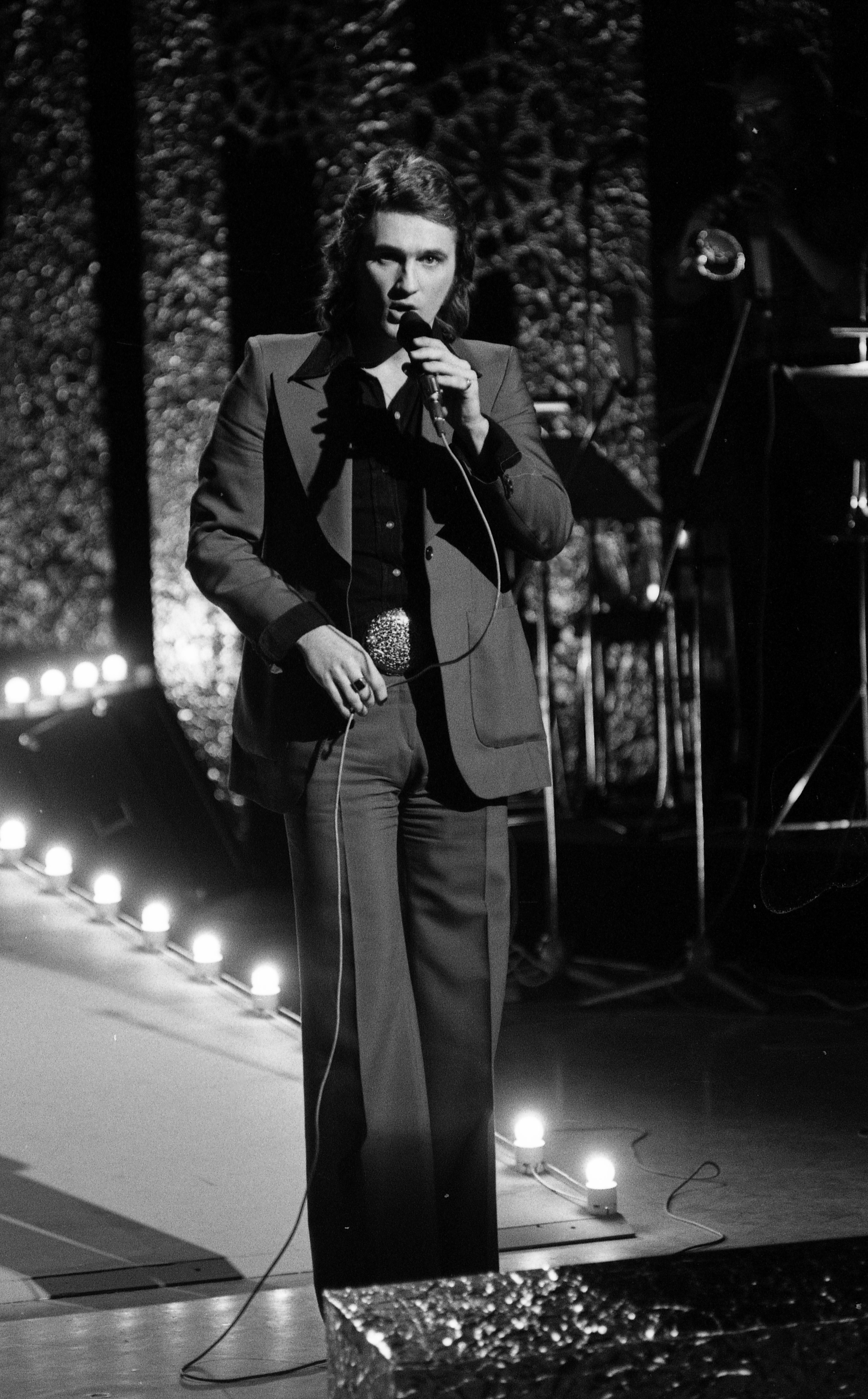
Spantell in 1974

Dag Aage Spantell (24 March 1950 – 30 November 2025) was a Norwegian singer who hit the height of his popularity in the 1970s.

== Life and career ==
Spantell was born in Oslo, Norway on 24 March 1950. At the age of twelve, he was inspired by The Shadows to start his own instrumental band called Beatboys, in which he played rhythm guitar. A huge fan of The Beatles he later joined the band Misfits in 1964, where he was a member until co-founding the band Happie in 1967. Writing many of his own songs, he was clearly inspired by The Beatles, vocal harmonies and the psychedelia of the time. At 18, he had his first TV appearance with Happie and their song Flowergirl.

Spantell looked set on retiring from music life and educated himself as a cook in 1969. However, he would continue as a musician, mainly as the lead singer of the dance band Kjell Karlsens Orkester. In 1973, he was given the song Kjendis-party, a Norwegian translation of the Ricky Nelson-hit Garden Party. The song became widely popular and reached No. 4 on Norsktoppen (an official chart for music in Norwegian). In 1975 his song En helt alminnelig sang om sommer reached the No. 1 spot.

Through the 1970s, Spantell recorded numerous singles and two albums as a solo artist, but most notably he appeared on several albums together with other artists. From 1975 to 1978, he became a part of the enormously popular På Treff-gang, a group of four singers (the others being Inger Lise Rypdal, Stein Ingebrigtsen and Gro Anita Schønn) who put out several albums with covers of international hit songs, often translated to Norwegian (during this period the four released nine albums). He toured extensively through the decade, often as part of På Treff and participated four times in the Norwegian finals for the Eurovision Song Contest. For a period, he was also lead singer in another dance band, Torry Enghs.

In 1978, he had a gig in the small fishing community of Båtsfjord in Northern Norway when a fight broke out. Spantell stepped in to separate the fighters and was dealt a serious blow to the throat that crushed his larynx. His singing career seemed over, but he forced himself to participate on the song Sol with the band Strikk, which became a huge radio hit in the summer of 1980.

Spantell then left the music industry and opened up a convenience store. In 1989, he made a brief stint singing in a band performing at the Royal Palace in Oslo, for the 18th birthday of Princess Märtha Louise. He then became the manager for two popular restaurants in Tønsberg and Risør, co-owned by three other artists. From 1996 to 2002, he was cruise manager for the ferry between Bergen, Norway and Newcastle, England before returning to the music business.

In 2004, the up-and-coming Norwegian rappers Jaa9 and OnklP contacted him about doing a new version of his 1973-hit Kjendis-party. The song became the national breakthrough for the young rappers and one of the most played songs of 2004. Spantell himself made several concert appearances with the boys and its success laid the foundation for a comeback on the Norwegian music scene.

In 2005, he released his first solo album since the 1970s, Det beste fra Dag Spantell, a greatest hits collection including 22 of his songs from 1968 to 1970. Spantell was back performing, and as he himself put it in a 2004-interview: "Now I want to end my life singing."

Spantell died from cancer on 30 November 2025, at the age of 75.

== Discography ==
=== Solo albums ===
- Nye spor (1975)
- I dag – i går (1976)
- Det beste fra Dag Spantell (2005)
