= Alf Andersen (musician) =

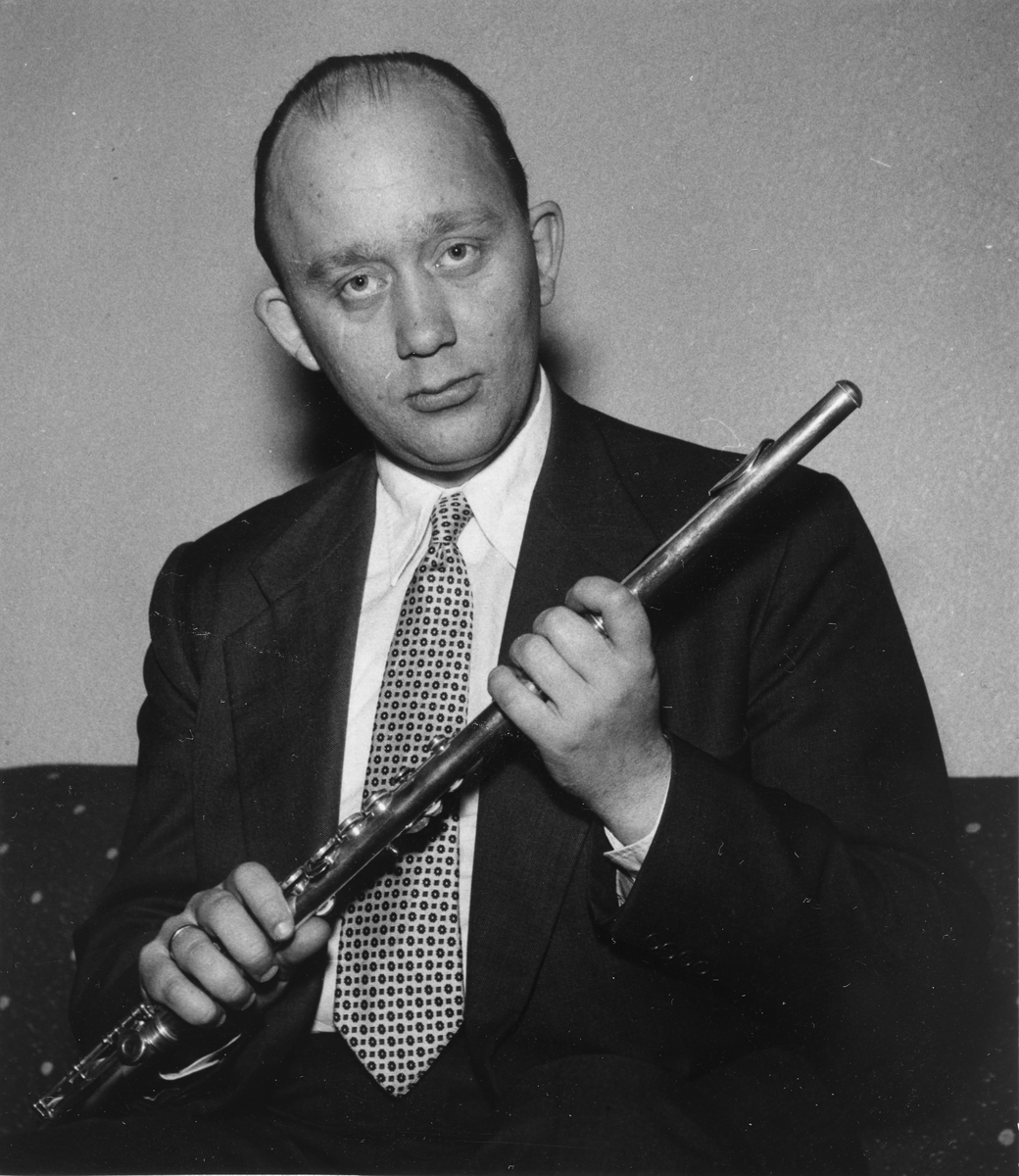
- Alf in Morgenposten, 6 June 1962

Background information
- Born: 25 November 1928
- Origin: Norway
- Died: 24 June 1962 (aged 33)
- Occupation: Musician
- Instruments: Flute

Alf Andersen (25 November 1928 - 24 June 1962) was a Norwegian flautist from Notodden, acknowledged as the leading Norwegian flautist in his time and well known through broadcasting NRK and for his leading role in Norwegian Radio Orchestra where he was solo flutist of the orchestra from the start in 1946 until his death in 1962.

== Biography ==
He studied the flute under Ørnulf Gulbransen. He was employee Mozarteum Orchestra in Salzburg for a period (1956), and over the years also a prominent chamber musician, often with pianists Ruth Lagesen or Kirsti Hjort. With oboist Tom Klausen he had a close working relationship. He remained true to Norwegian Radio Orchestra. Despite tempting offers from big orchestras abroad. His follower as a solo flautist in Norwegian Radio Orchestra counts names like Hans Schøyen, Per Øien, John Tonsjø and Tom Ottar Andreassen.

One of his chief interpretations were of Edgar Vareses Density 21.5 whose title drawn attention to the instrument. Likewise Finn Mortensens Sonata for flute, a composition Andersen himself had ordered and premiered (Universitetets Aula, 1954). He also performed duets with Magnetic tape players, like Bruno Madernas Music per due dimensioni for flute and tape. The Swedish composer Hilding Rosenberg dedicated Sonata for solo fløyte to Andersen, premiered in Sweden (April 1960). In Norway, it was performed by Andersen himself in Ny Musikks 7. subscription concert later that year. He also recorded a tune with the jazz musician Willy Andresen, in aquartet with Per Nyhaug and Håkon Nilsen (1961).

Andersen died 33 years old. He was a member of the Norwegian Order of Freemasons. The composer Arne Nordheim wrote Epitaffio for orchestra and tape to remind him (premiered in Stockholm in March 1964), and he was reminded of a week-long portrait at NRK radio (1971). Notodden award prizes to young musicians from Alf Anderson Memorial Fund (1988–).

== Honors ==
- 1st Prize in the Geneva International Music Competition 1958.
- Princess Astrid Music Prize 1958
- 7th place in the 20th Century classical musician, shared with Ole Edvard Antonsen
