= Jaa9 & OnklP =

Norwegian rapping duo

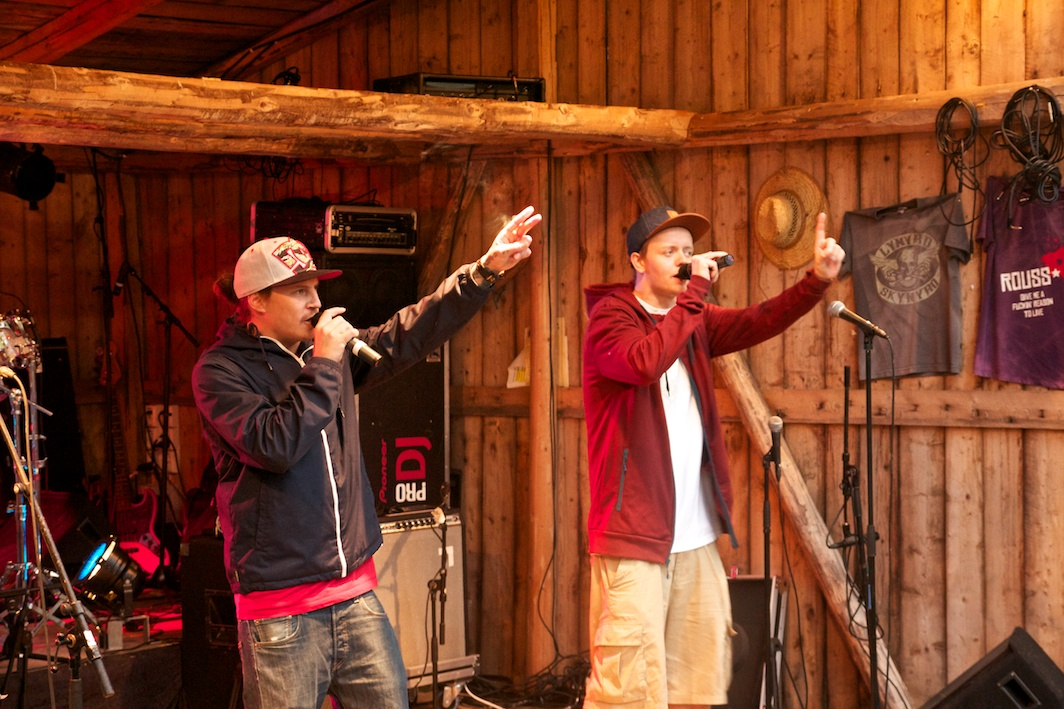
- OnklP and Jaa9 performing in 2013

Background information
- Origin: Valsøyfjord, Norway (Johnny); Lillehammer, Norway (Pål)
- Genres: Rap
- Years active: 2003-present
- Labels: Sony
- Members: Johnny Engdal Silseth (Jaa9); Pål Tøien (OnklP)

Jaa9 & OnklP is a Norwegian rapping duo made up of Jaa9 (real name Johnny Engdal Silseth) and OnklP (real name Pål Tøien). Both are members of the Norwegian rap collective Dirty Oppland.

The duo were discovered by Poppa Lars (real name Lars Sandness) and "Jørg-1" (real name Jørgen Nordeng) in Tungtvann and invited them to in the autumn of 2002 to participate in a track on their Feast EP. The duo has released several music albums jointly. In October 2003, Jaa9 & OnklP released the album, Bondegramatikk – the Mixtape, a collection of old and new tracks, put together by Poppa Lars and DJ Ross, including a version of Busta Rhymes' "I Know What You Want". Their most successful album was Sjåre brymæ in 2004 that reached number 3 on VG-lista, the official Norwegian Albums Chart. In 2005, OnklP and Jaa9 won the Alarmprisen award for "Best Hip Hop Album" for their album Sjåre Brymæ.

What added to the popularity of the duo was that the up-and-coming Norwegian rappers contacted Dag Spantell most popular in the 1970s, offering to make a new version of his Spantell's 1973-hit "Kjendisparty". The new version became a true national breakthrough for the young rappers and one of the most played songs of 2004. Spantell himself made several concert appearances with them. The single made it to number 2 in the VG-lista singles chart making it the duo's highest scoring hit.

After the independent mixtape Bondedramatikk – En Gateplate, in 2008, they were signed to Sony Music and released the album Sellout! in 2009, and the single "Glir Forbi" taken from the album.

During the 2011 MTV Europe Music Awards, the duo was nominated in the Final 5 for MTV Best Norwegian Act. But the award went to Eva & The Heartmaker.

In later years OnklP has been the vocalist of a rap-rockband named OnklP & De Fjerne Slektningene (The Distant Relatives). Both their albums received massive appraise.

== Members ==
=== Jaa9 ===
Johnny Engdal Silseth (born in Valsøyfjord on 2 March 1982), best known by his stage name Jaa9 is a Norwegian rapper.

=== OnklP ===
Pål Tøien (born in Lillehammer on 12 May 1984), best known by his stage name OnklP is a Norwegian rapper. Besides his partnership in Jaa9 & OnklP, he released his own solo album Det kunne vært deg on Pass It record label.

He has cooperated with other artists as well, notably with Oslo Ess in Fritt Fram in 2012 and in 2014 returned with an album Onklp & De fjerne slektningene.

== Discography: Jaa9 & OnklP ==
=== Albums and EPs ===
As Jaa9 & OnklP

Year	Album	Type	Peak positions	Certification
Year	Album	Type	NOR	Certification
2004	Sjåre brymæ	Album	3	
2009	Sellout!	Album	21	
2011	Lasse	EP	23	
2011	Geir	EP	31	
2013	Diskoteket er stengt	Album	11	

=== Mixtapes and other releases ===
- 2003: Quest Vol. 1
- 2003: Bondegrammatikk – The Mixtape
- 2008: Bondedramatikk – En Gateplate

=== Singles ===
Year	Single	Peak positions	Album
Year	Single	NOR	Album
2003	"Stank ass ho 2" (feat. Rune Rudberg)	11	
2004	"Kjendisparty"	2	Sjåre brymæ
2009	"Glir forbi"	3	Sellout!
2010	"Partysvenske"	7	
2016	"Jeg er" (feat. Cezinando)	X	

=== Appearances ===
- 2004: Dirty Oppland - Greatest Hits

== Discography: OnklP ==
=== Albums ===
Solo albums

Year	Album	Peak positions	Certification
Year	Album	NOR	Certification
2005	Det kunne vært deg	26	

as Onklp & De fjerne slektningene

Year	Album	Peak positions	Certification
Year	Album	NOR	Certification
2014	Onklp & De fjerne slektningene	8	
2014	Slekta II - Onklp & De fjerne slektningene	2	

=== Singles ===
as Onklp & De fjerne slektningene

Year	Single	Peak positions	Album
Year	Single	NOR	Album
2014	"Styggen på ryggen"	2	Onklp & De fjerne slektningene
2015	"Fru Johnsen"	26	
2016	"Endelig Hjemme"		

Awards
Preceded by Stein Torleif Bjella	Recipient of the lyrics Edvardprisen; 2015	Succeeded by Jeff Wasserman
