= Anne-Lise Berntsen =

Norwegian soprano (1943–2012)

Anne-Lise Berntsen (28 August 1943 – 3 November 2012) was a Norwegian soprano. The daughter of Harald Berntsen (1901–1974) and Arnhild Rossetnes (1916–1991), she was born in Drammen, and grew up in Eggedal. She studied at the Mozarteum, Salzburg, and undertook further music education in Aarhus, The Hague, and London. Berntsen made her concert debuts in Aarhus and in London in 1978. Her operatic debut was in Stockholm in 1984.

Hans Gefors composed the role of Lollo in his opera Vargen kommer with Berntsen in mind. She taught for several years at the Norwegian University of Science and Technology. She had a long-standing artistic collaboration and personal relationship with Nils Henrik Asheim, where their work together included the "Engleskyts" project, which produced two albums (Engleskyts and Kom Regn) that included Norwegian folk hymns and organ improvisations. Outside of music, Berntsen appeared in the film Derailment (1993).

Berntsen was married and divorced twice. Her first marriage to Erwin Fötschl, from 1966 to 1967, produced a son. Her second marriage, to Øyvind Gunnarsjaa, lasted from 1969 to 1987, and produced a daughter.
