= Kjell Samkopf =

- Born: 6 April 1952 (age 74); Bærum, Norway
- Genres: Contemporary music & jazz
- Occupations: Musician and composer
- Instruments: Drums, timpani and percussions
- Website: Official website

Kjell Samkopf (born 6 April 1952, in Bærum, Norway) is a Norwegian musician (drums) and composer, married 1993 to the dancer Mona Walderhaug (born 21 December 1956).

== Biography ==
Samkopf is a central figure on the Norwegian contemporary music scene, with a varied career as a composer, musician and educator and had an extensive background from various music genres. He was for many years associated with the Norwegian Academy of Music, where he attended the diploma program in composition in 1973 without any formal musical education. Here he worked as a musical teacher from 1979 and later as professor and head of the percussion department.

From the mid-1970s he was an active performer as drummer, and he stepped in as timpanist in Trondheim Symphony Orchestra (1974–75). He was for many years associated with Oslo Filharmoniske Orkester, and worked as a regular drummer in the Orchestra of Den Norske Opera for some years. He worked within "Ny Musikks Ensemble" and later in contemporary music ensemble "Octoband".

Samkopf's compositional output comprises nine full-length dance performances. He was also selected as the 1985 composer in residence for the Arctic Arts Festival. Smakopf's list of works features chamber music, orchestral works, electro-acoustic works, music for dance performances, soundtracks, TV-scores, educational works and a number of compositions for percussion. To date, Samkopf has received more than 40 commissions from institutions, ensembles and performers such as Harmonien, the Swedish Radio, Bergen Wind Quintet, NRK, Arts Council Norway, Collage Dance Company, Ultima Oslo Contemporary Music Festival, NorDans Productions, the Arctic Arts Festival, Eirik Raude and Kjell Tore Innervik.

Compositions for dance constitutes a substantial portion of Samkopf's production. The composer has written the scores for nine full length dance productions. His artistic partnership with choreographer Lise Nordal is a cornerstone of this compositional vein. In addition to a number of shorter ballets, Samkopf and Nordal have created five full-length productions Aqua (1986), Tidevann (1990), Til Elise (1996), Entré (2000) and Silent Gliss (2004).

== Honors ==
- 2012: Edvardprisen in the "Open class" for the album Burragorangian Stones

== Production ==
=== Selected works ===
==== Orchestral works ====
- Konsert for vibrafon og strykere (2008)
- Assosiasjoner (1984)
- En ouverture (1976)

==== Chamber music ====
- Chimes of transition (2010)
- Eit ord (2007)
- Bergen (1995)
- After you've gone (1989)
- Dobling dance (1981)
- Illusions (1979)

==== Solo works ====
- E 5 S (2005)
- Solo piece for tuba (1979)

==== Works for percussion ====
- Amelioration Études 1 – 9 (2015)
- A Book Of Études (2014)
- 369 For Percussion Trio (2013)
- Music for two marimbas - One playing softer than the other (2010/2011)
- 12 Orchestrations and interludes on Rachmaninoff (2008)
- Ingoma intro (1996)
- Selvportrett (1984)
- Oppfinnelse NR. 5 (1981)
- 10 Kvartetter for slagverk (1974)

=== Discography (in selection) ===
- 1983: Music For Solo Percussion And Electronics (Simax Classics)
- 1993: Har Du Sunget Den For Grieg? (dBut)
- 1994: Mårådalen Walk
- 1994: Kjell Samkopf
- 1994: Søyr, Bussene Lengter Hjem
- 1996: Kjell Samkopf, Triztan Vindtorn, Nattkonsert med lydskulpturer: Sandvika 8. september 1991
- 2012: Burragorangian Stones (Mere Records)

Awards
Preceded by Johan Sara	Recipient of the open class Edvardprisen; 2012	Succeeded by Helge Sunde
