= Hemmelig Tempo =

Norwegian musical group

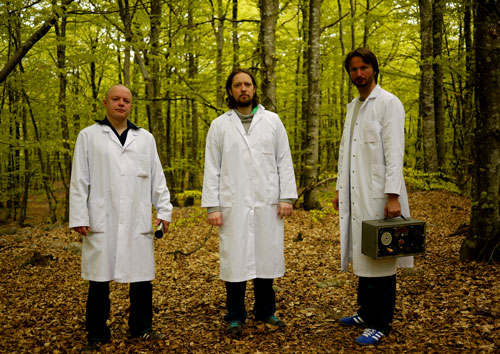
- Hemmelig Tempo in 2010.

Background information
- Origin: Bergen, Norway
- Genres: avant-garde, free improvisation, electronic music
- Years active: 2007-present
- Label: Musea
- Members: Professor Waffel; Doktor Døv; Profesesor Fokuda-san
- Website: hemmeligtempo.no

Hemmelig Tempo is a quasi-scientific, improvisational and partly satirical Norwegian sound experiment group notable for performances, concerts, installations, satirical video productions, album releases and a number of collaborations with artists and ensembles in other fields. Characteristically dressed in laboratory-coats, their output has been described as a "strong commentary to our technological existence".

== Biography ==
Hemmelig Tempo made their first public appearance dressed in white laboratory coats in Bergen, Norway in 2007. Combining a quasi-scientific approach with performance, improvisation and avant-garde electronical sound art, the group became known for their satirical role-play and "live research" performances featuring a vast number of diy electronical gadgets, synthesizers, transistor radios, household objects and machines.

During the Bergen Electronic Music & Art Festival in 2008, the group contributed with an installation in which the group replaced themselves with three toy robots producing random Aleatoric music. Reflecting the group's sense of satire, the installation was called Do we really need musicians?. The same year, the group also collaborated with the Norwegian contemporary dance ensemble Molitrix for a series of dance performances called Skin. Across the following years, the group produced a series of YouTube videos with titles such as 6 Unlikely Duos, 4 Unlikely Trios, and Bicycle Mixing Session. The latter experiment in Spatial music, described as a combination of a public health initiative and sound-engineering, consisted of three bicycles equipped with an amplifier and speaker which transmitted the sound of pre-recorded musical instruments. By placing microphones at each extreme side of a large-sized hall and manoeuvering the bicycles around the hall, a giant mixing system was in effect created, "allowing unpredictable volume and panning effects that could not be replicated with a normal mixing board" (op.cit). Here possibly making a reference to Kraftwerk's well documented interest in bicycles, Hemmelig Tempo has consistently placed themselves within the tradition of electronic music by making references to composers such as Arne Nordheim and John Cage in their album releases.

The group also collaborated with other artist, film-makers and ensembles during the next years, including making sound-design for the contemporary dance ensemble Winter Guests, appearing in a Visual Dissertation short film produced by Amehn Productions and shown at the Borealis Film Festival, collaborating with actors Liv Ullmann, Dennis Storhøi and Anders Baasmo Christiansen on a short, unreleased Radio play, and improvising live in a series of performances with Carte Blanche, the largest contemporary dance ensemble in Norway, in 2016.

== Releases ==
In 2011, the group released the album Who Put John Cage on the Guestlist on a sublabel of the French label Musea. The album received good reviews and was quoted as one of the Favorite Releases of the year by the US online magazine Asymmetry Music Magazine. One reviewer referred to the music as some of the most uncompromising electronic music I've ever encountered, while another described it as totally experimental, far out, challenging, sometimes exciting, sometimes a bit too weird but always intriguing for patient people.

In 2012, the group contributed with two tracks for the compilation Muu For Ears 9, produced by MUU, an artist run, Finnish interdisciplinary artist association, founded in 1987 to represent and promote new and experimental forms of art. The same year, the group also contributed on two tracks on the album Magic Handshake by the Norwegian space-rock band Seid.

In 2016, the group released the album Are You Part of Some Kind of Cult?, a concept album about an island of pseudo-science worshippers, inspired by the BBC Radiophonic Workshop.

In 2017, Professor Waffel released a solo album, Assemblages, constructed around tiny sampled fragments of classical modernist and ethnic music, field recordings, Foley, and live performances on a number of acoustic and electronic instruments.

== Members ==
In the booklet for the 2011 release "Who Put John Cage on the Guestlist", the following members are listed:

- Professor Waffel
- Doktor Døv
- Professor Fokuda-san
