= Magnar Åm =

Norwegian composer (born 1952)

Magnar Åm (born 9 April 1952) is a Norwegian composer.

== Selected works ==
- Concerto for Accordion "Tropic of Cancer" (review)

Awards
Preceded by Jan Erik Mikalsen	Recipient of the contemporary music Edvardprisen; 2014	Succeeded by Eivind Buene
