= Stein Torleif Bjella =

Norwegian songwriter, singer and guitarist

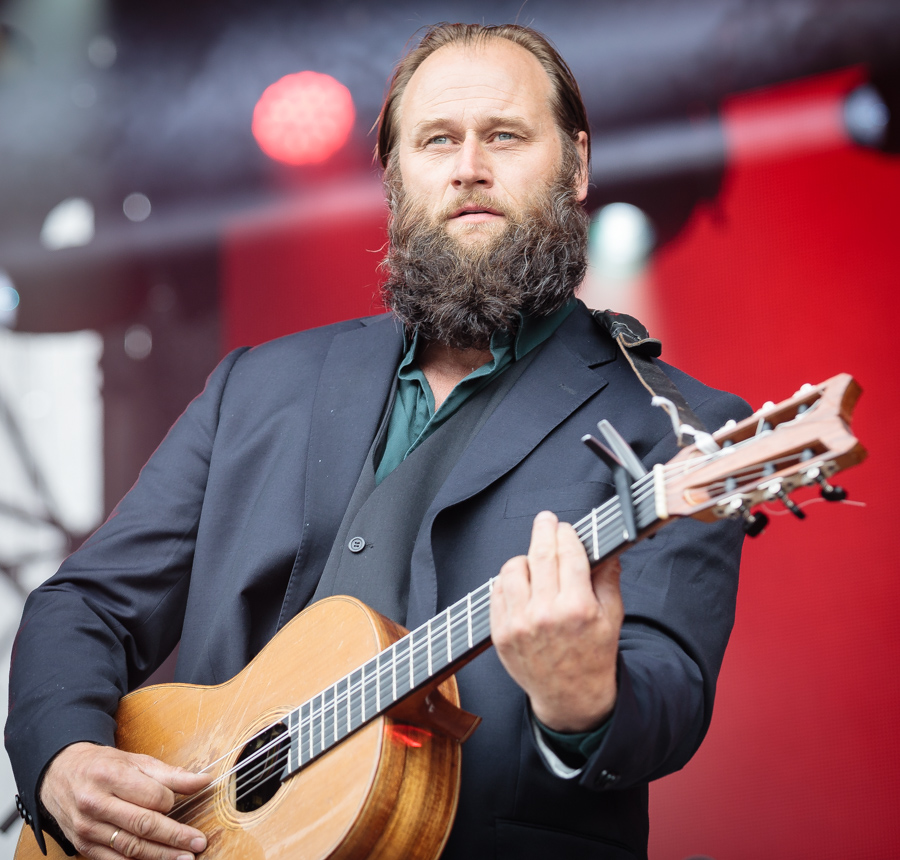
- Stein Torleif Bjella performing in 2018
- Born: 7 April 1968 (age 57); Ål, Norway
- Occupations: Singer; Songwriter; Guitarist
- Notable work: Heidersmenn (2009); Vonde visu (2011); Gode liv (2016)

Stein Torleif Bjella (born 7 April 1968) is a Norwegian songwriter, singer and guitarist.

== Life and career ==
Bjella was born in Ål, in the region of Hallingdal. His first solo album Heidersmenn from 2009 was well received. He was awarded Spellemannprisen for the 2011 folk music album Vonde visu. In 2013 he released his third solo album, Heim for å døy. In 2016 he released the album Gode liv.

In 2017, Bjella released the poetry book Jordsjukantologien Nr. 1. The following year, he released the album Jordsjukantologien, featuring his poetry set to music.

== Discography ==
- Heidersmenn (2009)
- Vonde Visu (2011)
- Heim For å Døy (2013)
- Gode Liv (2016)
- Jordsjukantologien (2018)
- Øvre-Ål Toneakademi (2020)

Awards
Preceded by Ragnar Olsen	Recipient of the lyrics Edvardprisen; 2014	Succeeded by OnklP
