= Asbjørn Schaathun =

Norwegian contemporary composer (born 1961)

Asbjørn Schaathun (born 22 June 1961) is a Norwegian contemporary composer.

== Career ==
Schaathun studied at the Norwegian Academy of Music and Royal College of Music in London and IRCAM in Paris.

Schaathun founded the Norwegian Academy of Music's Contemporary Music Ensemble and the Oslo Sinfonietta.

== Prizes and awards ==
- 1987 Norwegian Society of Composers: «Performer of the Year» as artistic director for Oslo Sinfonietta
- 1991 The Gaudeamus Fondation's Louis Vuitton Prize for his bass clarinet concerto "Actions, Interpolations and Analyses".
- 1992 Bang & Olufsen's Music Prize.
- 2008 The Lindeman Prize

== Production ==
=== Selected works ===
- Ohne Titel – London 1985 (2016–17)
- Nations for piano and orchestra (2015–16)
- Concerto Grosso (2014)
- Lament II for chamber ensemble (2013–14)
- Wie die Zeit die Materie verändert (III) for orchestra (2007)
- Musical Graffiti II, "virtuoso drawings for amplified piano, large ensemble and tape with cosmic sounds" (1983–84)
- Physis for piano and live-electronics (1986/2003)
- Action, Interpolations and Analyses, concerto for bass clarinet and large ensemble (1988–90)
- Double Portrait for violin and large ensemble (1991-92/1996/2002-06)
- "s" – Miniatüre pour ensemble (1992)
- A Tabular System... for horn, oboe, harp and percussion (1988/1994-95)

=== Discography ===
- Nordic Voices, Djånki Don (2008)
- Stavanger New Music Ensemble, 1-2-3 Happy Happy Happy! (2001)
- Oslo Sinfonietta, Actions, Interpolations & Analyses (1995)
- Håkon Austbø, Wanted (2011)
- Frode Haltli, Looking on darkness (2002)
- Cikada Ensemble, Svorsk, Swegian (1996)
- The Cikada Ensemble (1992)
- Kenneth Karlsson – the view was all in lines (2012)
