= Eivind Buene =

Norwegian contemporary composer

Eivind Buene (born 7 September 1973 in Oslo) is a Norwegian contemporary composer.

== Biography ==
1992 to 1998 saw Buene studying pedagogics and composition at the Norwegian Academy of Music. In 1999 and 2000 he was contemporary music ensemble Oslo Sinfonietta’s composer in residence.

From 2000 onwards, Buene has been active as a freelance composer, based in Oslo, writing for a number of ensembles and orchestras at home and abroad. His roster of received commissions includes works written for Ensemble Intercontemporain, Birmingham Contemporary Music Group, Fondation Royaumont and a variety of Scandinavian orchestras and ensembles.

The main bulk of Buene's list of works consists of compositions for soloists, ensembles and orchestras, but the composer has also focused on work with improvising musicians, developing music in the cross-section between classical notation and improv.

Buene's works have seen performances at venues such as Carnegie Hall, Berliner Philharmonie and Centre Pompidou. His debut as a stage composer came in August 2006 with the one act chamber opera September, based on Henrik Ibsen's Hedda Gabler.

2012 saw Buene being bestowed with a Spellemannsprisen Award, the Norwegian equivalent to the Grammy, for the album Possible Cities/Essentials Landscapes recorded by the Cikada Ensemble. In 2015, Buene received the Edvard Prize for his work Blue Mountain.

In addition to music, Buene has written music critique and essays, and he made his literary debut with the novel Enmannsorkester in 2010. His second novel Allsang was released in October 2012, and a collection of essays was published in March 2014. His third novel, Oppstandelse, was released in September 2016.

For the time frame 2015 to 2019, Buene has been appointed as assistant professor in composition at the Norwegian Academy of Music.

== Production ==
=== Selected works ===
==== Orchestral works ====
- In a network of lines... (1996/1997)
- Fragmentarium (1997)
- Scherzophrenia (2002)
- Three Improvisations for Wolfgang (2005)

==== Works for smaller ensembles ====
- Deaths and Entrances (1998)
- Exposé/Intermezzo/Symposium (1999)
- Objects of Desire (2000)
- Asymmetrical Music (2003/2004)
- Palimpsest (2004)
- Garland for Matthew Locke (2007)
- Seven Songs from Motion Girl (2015)

==== Chamber music ====
- Exposé II (1999)
- Micromusic (1999)
- Three Quartets (1998–2000)
- Intermission (2000)
- Seven Types of Ambiguity (2000)
- Pretzel Sentences (2000)
- Anatomic Notebook (2001–2002)
- Delta Ground Duo (2002)
- 08.10.03 (2003)
- Possible Cities (2005)
- Grid (2006)
- Landscape with ruins (2006)
- Ultrabucolic studies (2006)
- Molto Fluido (2007)

==== Works for strings ====
- Langsam und Schmachtend (2003)
- Stilleben (for Lauren Hartke) (2007)
- Vannmmusikk (2007)

==== Works for woodwinds ====
- Trauermarsch (1999)
- Prosezzion (2001)
- Topographics (2002)

==== Works for solo instruments ====
- Readings (1997)
- Nach (1998)
- Später (2001)
- Study no. 3 (2001)
- Delta Ground (2001)
- 4 miniatures (2002)
- Conversation with J.S. (2002)
- Mouvement (2003)
- City Silence (2005/2007)

==== Vocal music and opera ====
- 5 miniatyrer (texts by Rolf Jacobsen) (1992)
- Kaum einen Hauch (1998)
- September (2005)

==== Electronic works ====
- Second Conversation with J.S. (2002)
- Organ of Oil (2003)
- Collateral Damage (2003)
- The Names (2004)
- Memorabilia (2004)
- Noen var der og har sett meg (2005)
- Something Moves Me (2006)
- An die Musik (2007)

==== Discography ====
- Eivind Buene, Poing, Into the Void (2014)
- Eivind Buene, Schubert Lounge (2012)
- Eivind Buene, Cikada, Possible CIties/Essential Landscapes (2012)
- Det Norske Solistkor, White Nights (2011)
- Sjøforsvarets musikkorps, Oiseaux exotiques (2009)
- Ingar Zach / Ivar Grydeland / Eivind Buene, Asymmetrical Music (2007)
- Cikada, Cirrus (2007)
- Rolf Borch, Step Inside (2006)
- Tanja Orning, Cellotronics (2005)
- Affinis, Anatomic Notebook (2005)
- Thomas Kjekstad / Lars Erik ter-Jung, Twitter Machine (2004)
- Ning, Ning (2004)
- Ametri String Quartet (2003)
- Poing, Giants of Jazz (2003)
- Oslo Sinfonietta, Deaths and Entrances (2002)
- Kyberia, Navigations (2001)
- Oslo Sinfonietta, Faces (2000)

Awards
Preceded by Rolf Wallin	Recipient of the Spellemannprisen composer award 2012	Succeeded by Lars Petter Hagen
Preceded by Magnar Åm	Recipient of the contemporary music Edvardprisen; 2015	Succeeded by Olav Berg
