= John Persen =

Norwegian composer

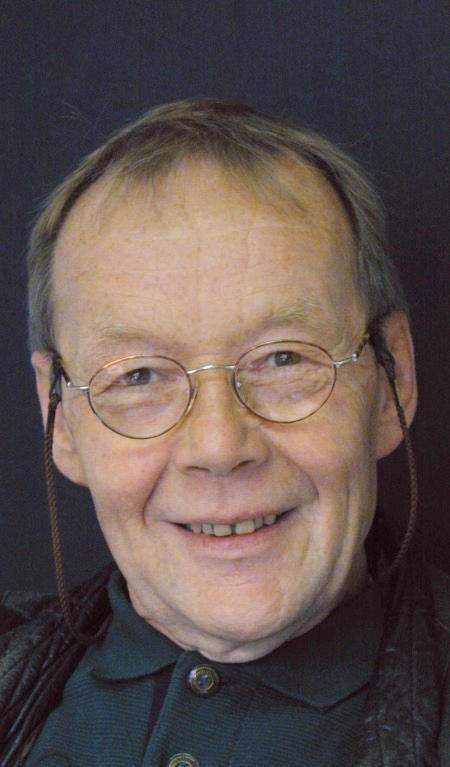
- Born: 9 November 1941; Porsanger, Norway
- Died: 12 December 2014 (aged 73)
- Occupation: composer
- Awards: Edvardprisen,

John Andreas Persen (9 November 1941 – 12 December 2014) was a Norwegian composer. John Persen grew up in a laestadian, Sami family in Ráigeadja in Porsanger Municipality and was a son-in-law of Finn Strømsted. In 1968, John Persen moved to Oslo to study music and initiated the establishment of the Norwegian Academy of Music at the same time. He was the student representative for the creation of the Norwegian Academy of Music (1969-1971), leader for the UNM music festival (1970-1973) and leader for Ny Musikk (1973-1976). He was a key player involved in Kunstneraksjonen 74 (an artist' right pressure group) and important advocate for the New Music. Together with Olav Anton Thomessen, he was a key initiator for the establishment of Norsk Musikkinformasjon in the early 1970s, which he was a board member of several times in the 1970s and 1980s. Furthermore, he was the initiator and first leader of the Ultima Oslo Contemporary Music Festival (1990-1994).

Among his compositions are the opera Under kors og krone from 1985, and the orchestral work Over kors og krone. Both these works are based upon the Kautokeino rebellion in 1852. He was awarded Lindemanprisen in 1999, and Edvardprisen twice, and was awarded honorary membership of the Norwegian Society of Composers.
