= Nordic Music Days =

Nordic Music Days is a festival for new Nordic music that was founded in 1888. It is one of the world's oldest festivals for contemporary classical music.

Every year, a member of the national societies of composers arranges the festival on behalf of the Council of Nordic Composers.

== History ==
Since the mid-nineteenth century, choirs from across the Nordic region have regularly participated in song festivals. These festivals had a distinctively "national" repertoire. Sometimes multiple countries jointly collaborated; for example, in 1929, a choir of 1,000 singers performed the cantata "Song of the North," written by five composers from five different Nordic countries.

The inaugural "Nordic Music Days" took place in Copenhagen in 1888, with a primary focus on instrumental and orchestral music. The festival invited composers from Denmark, Norway, Sweden, and other countries to have their works performed, and staged seven large-scale choral and orchestral concerts.

Subsequent festivals were held in Stockholm in 1897 and in Copenhagen again in 1919. The 1919 festival's lineup included conductors such as Carl Nielsen, Jean Sibelius, Wilhelm Stenhammer, and Johan Halvorsen. Helsinki hosted the festival for the first time in 1921, followed by Stockholm in 1927, Helsinki again in 1932, and Oslo in 1934. The Copenhagen festival in 1938 was the last one held before the outbreak of World War II.

After the war, the Nordic composers' societies united to form the Nordic Council of Composers, which assumed primary responsibility for the Nordic Music Days in 1946. Since 1948, the festival has been held biennially, rotating among the Nordic capitals. Until the 1970s, the repertoire focused exclusively on Nordic compositions. From 1974 to 1982, the festival began to include composers and works from "guest countries" such as Poland (1974), Canada (1976), the German Democratic Republic (1978), the United Kingdom (1980), and France (1982). After this, the festival returned to its exclusive focus on new Nordic music.
