= Rolf Wallin =

Norwegian composer (born 1957)

Rolf Wallin (born 7 September 1957) is a Norwegian composer, trumpeter and avant-garde performance artist.

== Biography ==
Wallin was born in Oslo, where he studied with Finn Mortensen and Olav Anton Thommessen. He later studied at the University of California where his teachers included Roger Reynolds and Vinko Globokar. Wallin’s music combines an intuitive freedom with a rigorous mathematical approach, such as use of fractal algorithms to construct melody and harmony.

In 1998 he was awarded the Nordic Council Music Prize.

== Career highlights ==
- 1976–82 – studied at the Norwegian State Academy of Music.
- 1987 – Norwegian Society of Composers Award for …though what made it has gone.
- 1991 – developed ‘crystal chord’ technique for generation of harmony in ning.
- 1998 – awarded Nordic Council Music Prize for Clarinet Concerto.
- 2000 – portrait CD Boyl released on Aurora label; wins Norwegian Spelemann prisen.
- 2001 – featured composer at Stockholm International Composer Festival.

== Key works ==
- …though what made it has gone (1987; mezzo-soprano, piano)
- Stonewave (1990; percussion)
- Boyl (1995; chamber ensemble)
- Concerto for Clarinet and Orchestra (1996)
- Ground (1996; cello, strings)
- Act (2004; orchestra)
- Strange News (2007; actor; orchestra; video-projection; electronics)

== Selected recordings ==
- Act; Das war schön!; Tides – Ondine ODE 1118-2
- Boyl; Concerto for Clarinet and Orchestra; Concerto for Timpani and Orchestra; Ground – Aurora ACD 5011
- Solve et coagula; ning; Stonewave; …though what made it has gone – Hemera HCD 2903
- Phonotope I – Aurora ACD 5035

Awards
Preceded by Nils Henrik Asheim and Susanne Sundfør	Recipient of the Spellemannprisen composer award 2011	Succeeded by Eivind Buene
