= Peter Herresthal =

Norwegian violinist

Peter Herresthal (born 3 November 1970 in Oslo) is a Norwegian violinist and Professor at the Norwegian Academy of Music in Oslo and Visiting Professor at Royal College of Music in London. He won the Spellemannprisen in 2002.
