= BIT20 Ensemble =

- Chamber orchestra
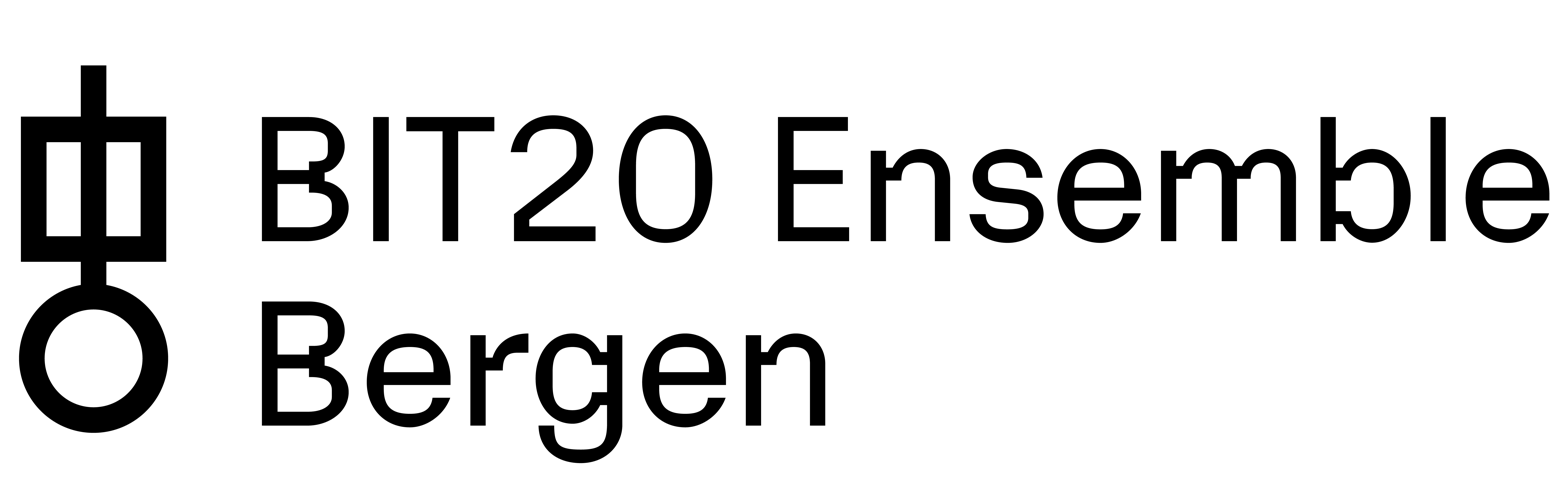
- Founded: 1989
- Location: Bergen, Norway
- Concert hall: Grieghallen
- Website: www.bit20.no

The BIT20 Ensemble is a contemporary music ensemble from Bergen, Norway, founded in 1989. It was formed in the merger of the quartet, Bit4, and Ensemble 20.

The ensemble has headquarters at Grieghallen. During its history, BIT20 Ensemble has performed more than 400 works and the ensemble serves as an important Nordic platform for new music, commissioning over 100 original works that have premiered internationally. The core of the BIT20 Ensemble is its 17 Principal Players. The ensemble's recordings comprise a catalogue of 20th-century classics, on numerous labels.

BIT20 Ensemble specializes in new Norwegian music and has commissioned and premiered hundreds of Norwegian works as well as contributed to 26 CD recordings, including composers such as Arne Nordheim, Ketil Hvoslef, Kristine Tjøgersen, Knut Vaage and Øyvind Torvund. In 2019 the ensemble released Torvund's composition The Exotica Album on the label Hubro Music.

Promoting children's interest in music and art is an important objective for the BIT20 Ensemble, which since 2007 has involved several thousand children in educational projects. Modern opera is also a fundamental sphere of the BIT20 Ensemble's activities. Since the start of its collaborations with Opera Vest and later Den Nye Opera, the BIT20 Ensemble has participated in more than 20 operas.

== Awards ==
In 2005 the BIT20 Ensemble was nominated for the Nordic Council’s Music Prize and Danish Music Awards-Classical. In 2003 the ensemble was given an honorary prize by the Norwegian Performing Rights Organisation TONO for its outstanding role in presenting Norwegian Music abroad. In 1993 the ensemble was hailed as Performer of the Year by the Norwegian Society of Composers for its promotion of Norwegian contemporary music. The ensemble have also been nominated to Spellemannprisen.

== Musicians ==
- Flute: Ingela Øien
- Clarinet: Håkon Nilsen
- Bassoon: James Lassen
- horn: Danilo Kadovic
- Trumpet: Jon Behncke
- Trombone: Grethe Tonheim
- Harp: Johannes Wik
- Piano: Jarle Rotevatn
- Violin: Jutta Morgenstern
- Violin: Martin Shultz
- Viola: Liene Klava
- Cello: Agnese Rugevica
- Electronics: Thorolf Thuestad
- Double Bass: Callum Jennings
- Oboe: Hege Sellevåg
- Percussion: Owen Weaver
