= Arne Nordheim =

Norwegian composer (1931–2010)

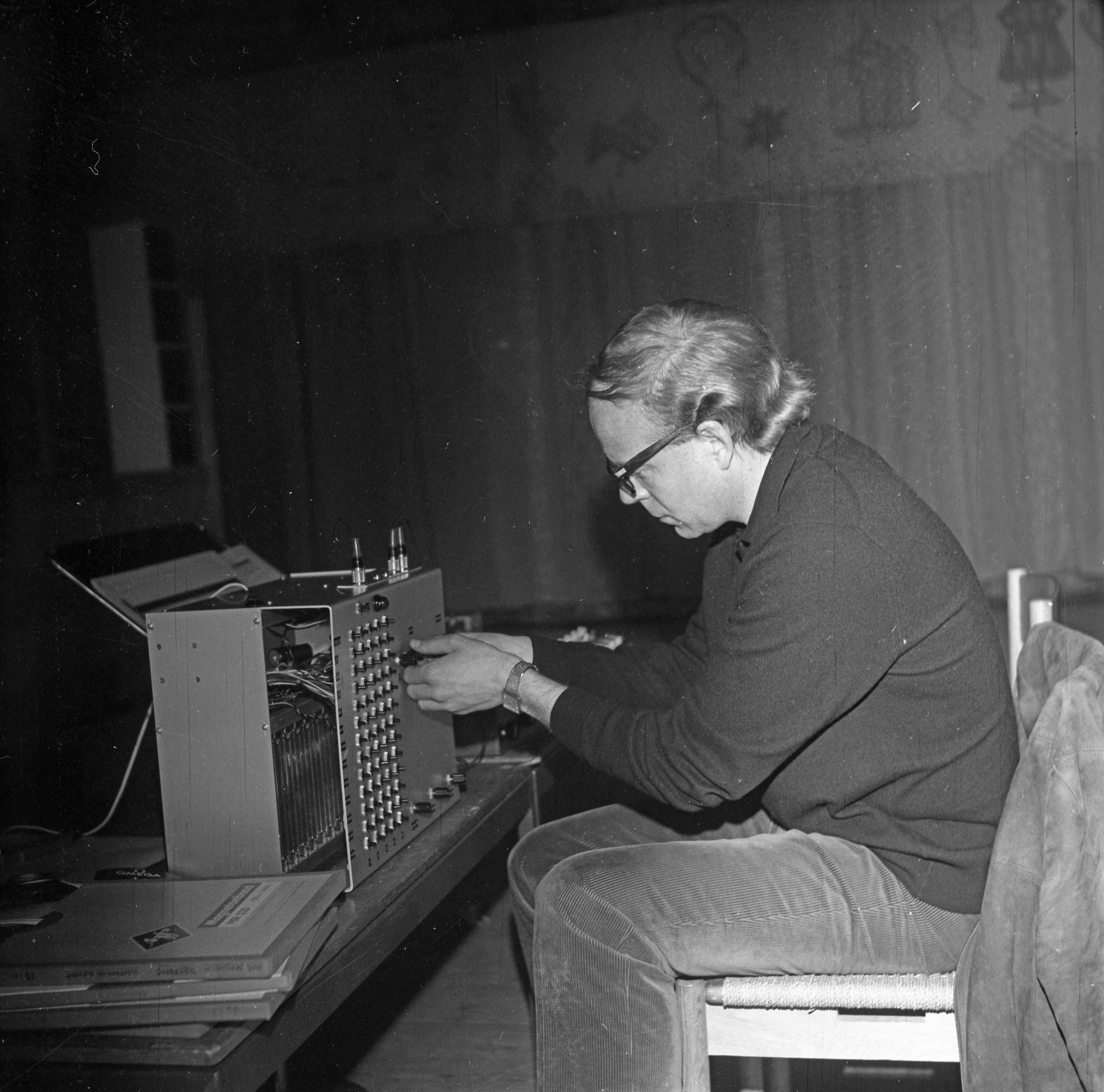
- Nordheim in 1968
- Born: 20 June 1931; Larvik, Norway
- Died: 5 June 2010 (aged 78)
- Occupation: Composer

Arne Nordheim (20 June 1931 – 5 June 2010) was a Norwegian composer. Nordheim received numerous awards for his compositions, and from 1982 lived in the Norwegian government's honorary residence, Grotten, next to the Royal Palace in Oslo. He was elected an honorary member of the International Society for Contemporary Music in 1997. On 18 August 2006, Arne Nordheim received a doctor honoris causa degree at the Norwegian Academy of Music. He died at the age of 78 and was given a state funeral.

== Musical education ==
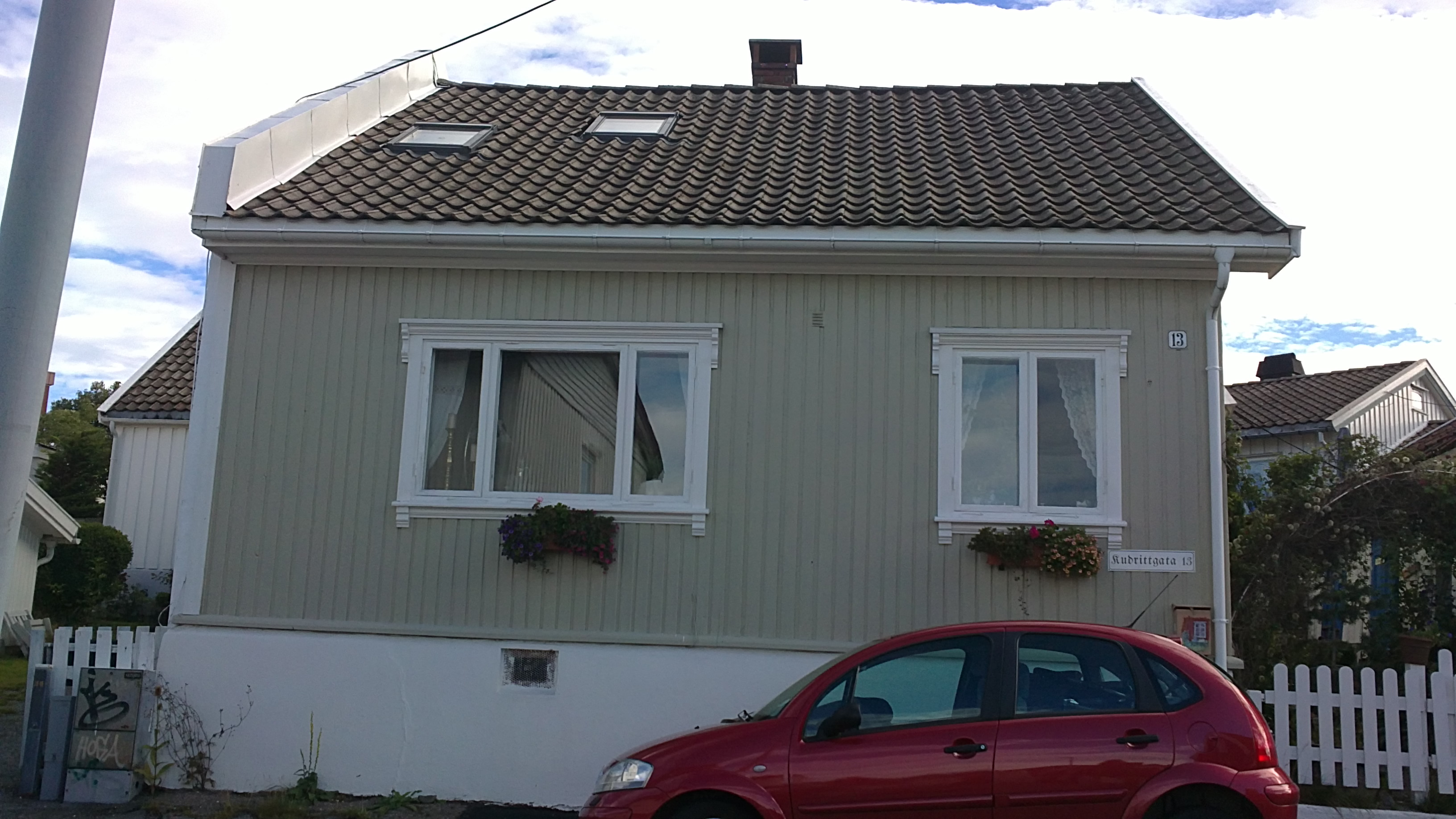
Arne Nordheim's childhood home at 13 Øvre Jegersborggate.

At the then Oslo Conservatory of Music (now the Norwegian Academy of Music), where Nordheim studied from 1948 to 1952, he started out as a theory and organ student, but changed to composition, studying with Karl August Andersen (1903–1970), Bjarne Brustad, and Conrad Baden. Then in 1955 he studied with Vagn Holmboe in Copenhagen, and studied musique concrète in Paris. Later he studied electronic music in Bilthoven (1959), and paid many visits to the Studio Eksperymentalne of Polish Radio (1967–1972), where many of his early electronic works were realised (including Pace, Solitaire, and Lux et tenebrae (Poly-Poly)). In 2005, many lost and forgotten tapes of electronic compositions for radio drama for the Norwegian Broadcasting Corporation (NRK) were rediscovered, reminding us that Nordheim also developed his electronic musical language in his home country.

== Career ==
His Essay for string quartet was first performed in Stockholm in 1954, but Nordheim always considered his String Quartet of 1956 as his Opus 1. His musical output is focused around themes of 'solitude, death, love, and landscape'; these themes are already evident in his song cycle Aftonland (Evening Land, 1959), a setting of poems by the Swedish poet Pär Lagerkvist, which brought him national recognition. The 1961 Canzona per orchestra was his international breakthrough. Inspired by Giovanni Gabrieli's canzone, the work showcases Nordheim's historical leanings, as well as his occupation with space as a parameter of music. Nordheim's spatial concerns, coupled with his focus on death and human suffering, are brought together in what is arguably his most famous work, Epitaffio per orchestra e nastro magnetico (1963). Written in memory of the Norwegian flautist Alf Andersen, who died that year at a very young age, the work incorporated Salvatore Quasimodo's poem Ed è sùbito sera. Originally conceived for orchestra and chorus, Nordheim realised that his wish to have the whole performance space 'singing' was better achieved with the use of electronic means. The result is a remarkable, almost imperceptible, blending of the orchestral sounds with the choral sounds of the tape, where the final line 'ed è sùbito sera' ('and suddenly it is evening') is the only part of the text that can be heard.

His later compositions include The Tempest (1979), Klokkesong (1984), Magma (1988), the Violin Concerto (1996) and Fonos for trombone and orchestra (2004). Arne Nordheim was inspired by the neumes and the sound of the medieval bells in Kaupanger stave church in composing the work Klokkesong, which was first performed in the church. In The Tempest, a ballet based on Shakespeare's play, electronics and orchestral sounds are again mixed, while the focus is more strongly on vocal music (e.g. the 'double voice' of Caliban), while Nordheim's continued use of historical elements is shown by the incorporation of Leonardo da Vinci's musical rebus, which solved reads Amore sol la mi fa remirare, la sol mi fa sollecita.

1968 saw Arne Nordheim being bestowed with the Nordic Council Music Prize for his Eco for soprano, two choirs and orchestra. The work marks the start of a new development phase, in which Nordheim proved that he could create electrophonic-sounding timbres from conventional instruments.

In 1970 he and sound engineer Eugeniusz Rudnik made the piece Poly-Poly for the Scandinavian pavilion at Expo '70 in Osaka. This sound installation consisted of six tapes of different lengths which are played in a loop, such that the piece will not repeat itself for 102 years. A 21-minute long concert version was released the year after, with the name Lux et Tenebrae.

Draumkvedet is a monumental stage work for orchestra, (acting) chamber choir, soloists and dancers, and was performed 40 times in 1994 with the Broadcasting Corporation Radio Orchestra and Grex Vocalis. A recording featuring these performing forces conducted by Ingar Bergby was made in 2001, and released in 2006 as a two-CD set on the Simax label (Simax PSC 1169). Based on a medieval Norwegian poem (Draumkvedet, The Dream Song), the work was composed in honor of the millennium of the city of Trondheim in 1997.

To commemorate Nordheim's 70th birthday in 2001, a celebratory concert was held, featuring the Oslo Philharmonic Orchestra. The Norwegian Ministry of Culture and Church Affairs would also celebrate the composer, and established the Arne Nordheim Composer's Prize which is bestowed on an annual basis to a composer of Norwegian residence.

In later years, Nordheim suffered from dementia, and expired early on Saturday 5 June 2010, following a prolonged bout of illness. The state funeral was held at the Oslo Cathedral on the 16th of June.

== Prizes and awards ==
- 1975: Member of The Royal Swedish Academy of Music
- 1981: The Lindeman Prize
- 1990: The Arts Council Norway Honorary Award
- 1993: The Henrik Steffens Prize
- 1997: Anders Jahre Cultural Prize (jointly with Gordon Hølmebakk)
- 2001: Vestfold Fylkeskommune's Art Prize
- 2001: Oslo Culture Prize

== Astronomical honor ==
3457 Arnenordheim, a minor planet circling the Sun in the main asteroid belt between the planets Mars and Jupiter was named for the composer after its discovery in 1985.

== Cultural references ==
- Arne Nordheim's popularity grew enormously when Frank Zappa arrived in Copenhagen in 1973, and told journalists he wanted to meet Arne Nordheim. Later, Zappa performed in Norway with Nordheim as a VIP guest. A lifelong friendship developed between the two, and Nordheim was invited to the US, while Zappa always visited Nordheim when performing in Norway.
- Norwegian painter Håkon Bleken produced a series of large charcoal drawings inspired by Nordheim's quote that "music lives in the span between poetry and catastrophe".
- "A Study Dedicated to Arne Nordheim" is the title of a track on Hemmelig Tempo's album Who Put John Cage on the Guestlist? (2010).

== Production ==
=== Selected works ===
==== Music for stage productions ====
- Katharsis (ballet), orchestra and tape (1962)
- Favola (music drama for TV), 2 singers, 10 dancers, orchestra, and tape (1963)
- Ariadne (ballet based on cantata Tempora Noctis), (1977)
- Stormen (ballet), 2 singers, orchestra, tape, (1979)
- Kong Lear (theatre music), (1985)
- Antigone (theatre music), (1991)
- Draumkvedet (music drama), vocal soloists, dancers, choir, orchestra, tape, (1994)

==== Orchestral works and concertos ====
- Canzona, orchestra, (1960)
- Epitaffio, orchestra and tape, (1963)
- Eco (text: S. Quasimodo), soprano, children's choir, mixed choir and orchestra, (1968)
- Floating, orchestra, (1970)
- Greening, orchestra,(1973)
- Doria (text: E. Pound), tenor and orchestra, (1975)
- Nachruf for Strings, (1975)
- Spur, accordion and orchestra, (1975)
- Tempora Noctis (text: Ovid), soprano, mezzo-soprano, orchestra and tape, (1979)
- The Tempest Suite (text: W. Shakespeare), soprano, barython, orchestra and tape, (1979)
- Tenebrae, cello and orchestra, (1982)
- Wirklicher Wald (text: R. M. Rilke), soprano, cello, mixed choir and (1983)
- Boomerang, oboe and chamber orchestra, (1985)
- Recall and Signals, symphonic wind ensemble, percussion and emulator, (1986)
- Rendezvous for strings, (1987)
- Magma, orchestra, (1988)
- Monolith, orchestra, (1991)
- Adieu, string orchestra and bell instruments, (1994)
- Cada Cancion (text: F. Garcia Lorca), children's choir, mixed choir and orchestra, (1994)
- Non Gridate (text: G. Ungaretti), soprano, mixed choir and orchestra, (1995)
- Confutatis, soprano, mixed choir and orchestra (1995)
- Nedstigningen (text: S. Mehren, Job, Catullus, Dante), recitation, soprano, girl's choir, orchestra and electronics, (1996)
- Violin Concerto, (1996)
- Nidaros (1997)

==== Chamber music ====
- Essay, string quartet, (1954)
- Epigram, string quartet, (1955)
- Strykekvartett, (1956)
- Aftonland (text: P. Lagerkvist), soprano and chamber ensemble, (1957)
- Partita, viola, cembalo and percussion, (1963)
- Response I, 2 percussionists and tape, (1966)
- Signaler, accordion, el-guitar and percussion, (1967)
- Response II, 1 percussionists and tape, (1968)
- Colorazione, Hammond-organ, percussion, electronic delay, ring-modulator filters, (1968/1982)
- Partita II, el-guitar, (1969)
- Dinosauros, accordion and tape, (1971)
- Listen, piano, (1971)
- OHM, (1971)
- The Hunting of the Snark, trombone solo, (1975)
- To One Singing (text: P. B. Shelley), tenor and harpe, (1975)
- Be Not Afeard (text: W. Shakespeare), soprano, baryton, chamber ensemble and tape, (1977)
- Response, organ, 4 percussionists and tape, (1977)
- Response IV, 4 percussionists and tape, (1977)
- Clamavi, cello solo, (1980)
- Partita for Six Double Basses, (1982)
- Aurora (text: Salme 139, Dante), 4 singers, crotali and tape, (1983)
- Flashing, accordion solo, (1986)
- Partita für Paul, violin with electronic delay, (1985)
- Acantus Firmus, jazz vocalist, Hardanger Fiddle and tape, (1987)
- The Return of the Snark, trombone and tape, (1987)
- Tractatus, solo flute and chamber ensemble, (1987)
- Tre Voci (text: F. Petrarca, G. Bruno, G. Ungaretti), soprano and chamber ensemble, (1988)
- Duplex, violin and viola, (1991)
- Magic Island (text: W. Shakespeare), soprano, baryton, chamber orchestra and tape, (1992)
- Suite per violoncello solo, (1996)
- Three Stanzas, double bass solo, (1998)
- Strykekvartett, (2001)
- Solar Plexus (text: G. Johannessen (2002)
- Partita per carillon, (2002)

==== Choir ====
- Aurora 4 solo voices, mixed choir, 2 percussion groups and tape, (1983)
- Music to Two Fragments to Music by Shelley (text: P. B. Shelley), female choir, (1985)
- Tres Lamentationes (Secundum Hieremiam Prophetam), mixed choir, (1985)

==== Electro-acoustic music and mixed media ====
- Ode til lyset, (1968)
- Solitaire, (1968)
- Warszawa, (1968)
- Pace, (1970)
- Forbindelser for fem byer (1975)
- Poly-Poly, based on Lux et tenebrae (1970), electro-acoustic music for the Scandinavian pavilion at the Expo 70 in Osaka, Japan, (1979)
- Nedstigningen, (1996)

==== Music for film and TV ====
- Læraren (TV) (1963)
- Klimaks (1965)
- Stoppested (TV) (1966)
- En dag i Ivan Denisovitsj' liv (1970)
- Dagny (1977)
- I solkorsets tegn (TV) (1981)
- Forfølgelsen (1981)
- Ja, vi elsker (1983)
- Kong Lear (TV) (1985)
- Stella Polaris (1993)

=== Discography – selected releases ===
- Epitaffio (2011)
- Einar Steen-Nøkleberg, Nordheim - Beethoven – Nordheim (2007)
- Draumkvedet (2006)
- Dodeka (2003)
- Listen - the Art of Arne Nordheim (2002)
- Peter Herresthal, Arne Nordheim - Complete Violin Music (2001)
- Ketil Hvoslef, Soon-Mi Chung, Stephan Barratt-Due, Wolfgang Amadeus Mozart, Duodu - Duoer for fiolin og Bratsj / Soon-Mi Chung og Stephan Barratt-Due (1994)
- The Norwegian String Quartet, Terje Tønnesen, Nordheim; Hallgrimsson (1990)
- The Norwegian String Quartet, Arne Nordheim - Antonio Bibalo - String Quartets (1987)
- The Tempest: Suite From The Ballet (1980)
- Musique Électronique Norvégienne with Alfred Janson and Bjørn Fongaard (1968)

Awards
Preceded by Espen Skjønberg	Recipient of the Norsk kulturråds ærespris 1990	Succeeded by Synnøve Anker Aurdal
