= List of compositions by Einojuhani Rautavaara =

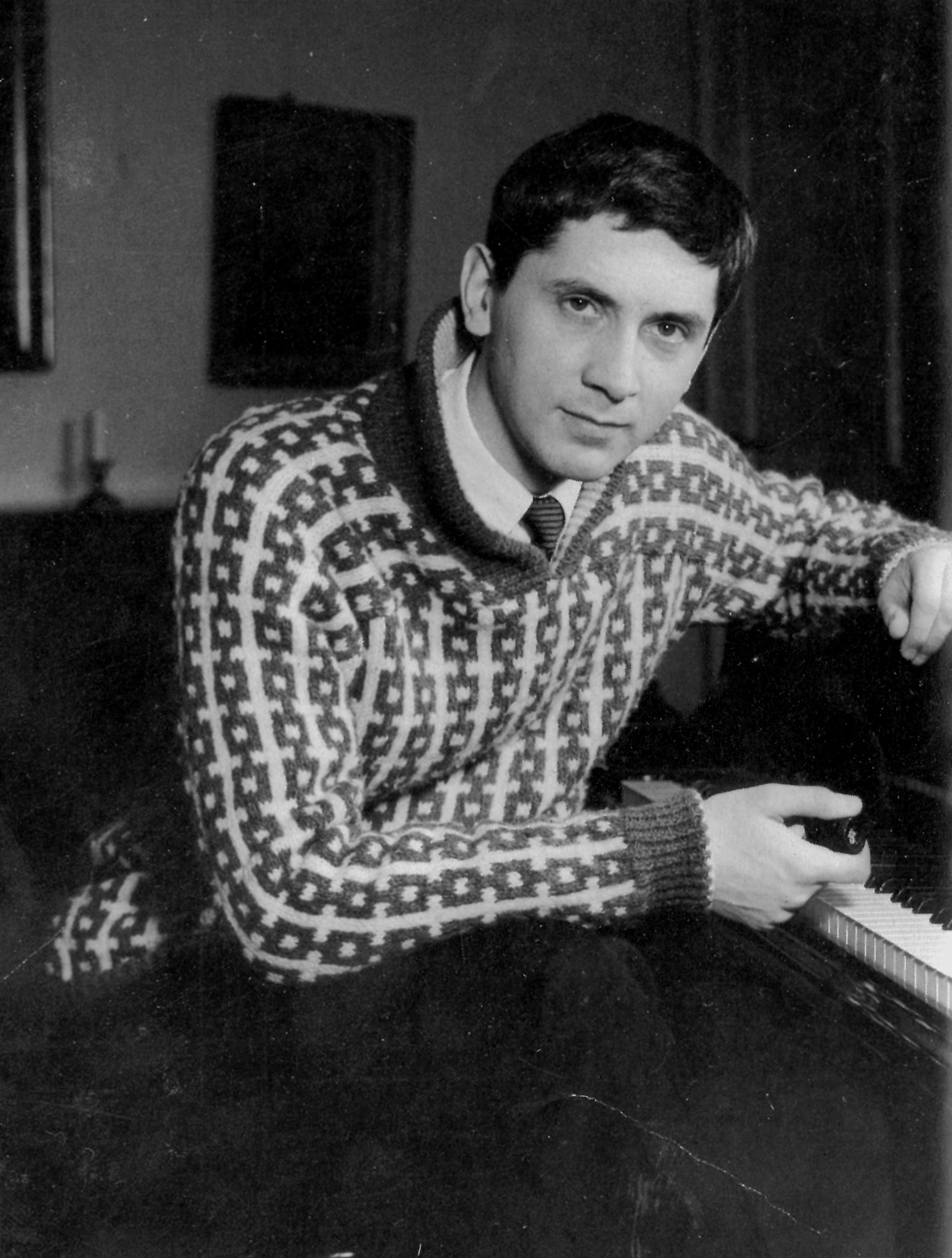
Rautavaara in the 1950s

This is a list of compositions by Einojuhani Rautavaara. Rautavaara stopped using opus numbers for his new compositions during the 1970s. In addition, he revised several of his compositions many years after they were originally composed. Therefore, using opus numbers in connection with his works is not a necessity.

== Operas ==
- Kaivos (The Mine) (1957–1958/1960/1963)
- Apollo contra Marsyas (1970)
- The Abduction of the Sampo (Runo 42: Sammon ryosto), choral opera (1974/1982)
- Marjatta, the Lowly Maiden (Marjatta Matalan Neiti) (1975)
- A Dramatic Scene, "Late One Night" (En dramatisk Scen) (1976)
- Thomas (1982–1985)
- Vincent (1986–1987)
- The House of the Sun (Auringon talo) (1989–1990)
- The Gift of the Magi (Tietäjien lahja), chamber opera (1993–1994)
- Aleksis Kivi (1995–1996)
- Rasputin (2001–2003)

== Incidental music ==
- Incidental Music to sä-Peikko ja Simpukka-Ukko (Father Troll and Old Man Clam) (1952)
- Soundtrack to Hiilivalkea (Coal Fire) (1975)

== Ballet ==
- The Temptations (Kiusaukset) (1969)

== Orchestral ==
- Symphonies
  - Symphony No. 1 (1956/1988/2003)
  - Symphony No. 2, Intima (1957/1984)
  - Symphony No. 3 (1961)
  - Symphony No. 4, Arabescata (1962)
  - Symphony No. 5 (1985)
  - Symphony No. 6,Vincentiana (1992)
  - Symphony No. 7, Angel of Light (1994)
  - Symphony No. 8, The Journey (1999)
- Modificata (1957/2003)
- Canto II (1960)
- Helsinki Fanfare (1967/87)
- Lahti Fanfare (1967)
- In memoriam J. K. Paasikivi (1967)
- Anadyomene (Adoration of Aphrodite) (1968)
- Helsinki Dancing (1971)
- Cantus Arcticus, concerto for birds and orchestra (1972)
- Garden of Spaces (1972/2003)
- Fanfare for the Lahti World Champion Skiing Competition (1978)
- Angels and Visitations (1978)
- Ostrobothnian Polska (1980)
- Lintukoto (Home of the Birds, or Isle of Bliss) (1995)
- Autumn Gardens (1999)
- Book of Visions (2003–05)
- Manhattan Trilogy (2004)
- Before the Icons (1955-56/2005)
- A Tapestry of Life (2007)
- In the Beginning (2015-2016)

== Concertante ==
- Cello Concerto No. 1 (1968)
- Piano Concerto No. 1 (1969)
- Ballad, for harp and strings (1973/1981)
- Flute Concerto Dances with the Winds (1975)
- Violin Concerto (1976–77)
- Organ Concerto Annunciations (1976–77)
- Double Bass Concerto Angel of Dusk (1980) (later arranged for double bass, two pianos and percussion)
- Piano Concerto No. 2 (1989)
- Piano Concerto No. 3 Gift of Dreams (1998)
- Harp Concerto (2000)
- Clarinet Concerto (2002)
- Percussion Concerto Incantations (2008)
- Cello Concerto No. 2 Towards the Horizon (2008/2009)
- Fantasia, for solo violin and orchestra (2015)
- Deux Sérénades, for violin and orchestra (2016/18 completed by Kalevi Aho)

== String Orchestra ==
- The Fiddlers (Pelimannit) (1952/1972) (originally for piano)
- Suite for Strings (1952)
- Divertimento (1953)
- An Epitaph for Béla Bartók (1955/1986)
- Canto I (1960)
- Finnisch, heute (Finnish, Today) (1970)
- Canto III: A Portrait of the Artist at a Certain Moment (1972)
- Three Meditations for Orchestra (1973) (extracted from Lapsimessu)
- Ballade for harp and strings (1973/1981)
- Suomalainen myytti (A Finnish Myth) (1977)
- Pohjalainen polska (Ostrobothnian Polska) (1980/1993) (Arranged from the orchestral version)
- Hommage à Kodály Zoltán (Bird Gardens) (1982)
- Epitaph for Béla Bartók (1986) (arranged from the version for cello and piano)
- Hommage à Liszt Ferenc (1989)
- Canto IV (1992)
- Apotheosis (1992/1996)
- Adagio celeste (2000)
- Canto V – Into the Heart of Light (2011)

== Wind/Brass Ensemble ==
- A Requiem in Our Time, for brass ensemble and percussion (1953)
- Sotilasmessu (A Soldier's Mass) (1968)
- Playgrounds for Angels, for brass band (1981)
- Serenade in Brass, for brass band (1982)

== Chamber Music ==
- String Quartets:
  - String Quartet No. 1 (1952)
  - String Quartet No. 2 (1958)
  - String Quartet No. 3 (1965)
  - String Quartet No. 4 (1975)
- String Quintets:
  - String Quintet No. 1 Les cieux inconnus (1997)
  - String Quintet No. 2 Variations for Five (2013)
- Table Music for Duke Johan, for recorder quartet (1954)
- Quartet for Oboe and Strings (1957/1965)
- Octet for Winds (1962)
- Ballade, for harp and string quintet (1973/1980)
- Ugrilainen dialogi (Hungarian Dialogue), for violin and cello (1973)
- Sonata for Flute and Guitar (1975)
- Music for Upright Piano and Amplified Cello (1976)
- Polska, Variations on a folksong from Rantasalmi (1977), for two cellos and piano
- Electropus, for two winds, percussion, guitar, lutes, and piano (1977)
- Fanfare for EMO, for two trumpets, two trombones and tape (1983)
- Hymnus, for trumpet and organ (1999)
- Con Spiritus di Kuhmo, for violin and cello (1999)
- The Last Runo, for flute and string quartet (2007)
- Fanfare per Fagotti, for six bassoons (2010)

== Instrumental ==
- Two Preludes and Fugues on BEla BArtok and EinAr EnGlunD, for cello and piano (1955)
- Partita, for guitar (1956/1980 - incomplete 1956 version lost)
- Bassoon Sonata (1965/1968)
- Sonetto, for clarinet and piano (1969)
- Sonata for Solo Cello (1969/2001)
- Dithyrambos, for violin and piano (1970) (also in version for violin and orchestra)
- April Lines, for violin and piano (1970/2006)
- Cello Sonata No. 1 (1972–1973/2001)
- Variétude, for violin (1974)
- Tarantará, for solo trumpet (1976)
- Serenades of the Unicorn, for guitar (1977)
- Monologues of the Unicorn, for guitar (1980)
- Luonnekuvaa (Nature Pieces), for guitar (1980)
- Cello Sonata No. 2 (1991)
- Notturno e Danza, for violin and piano (1993)
- Sydämeni Laulu (Song of My Heart), for cello and piano (1996/2000)
- Lost Landscapes, for violin and piano (2005)
- Summer Thoughts, for violin and piano (2008)
- Whispering, for violin and piano (2010)

== Piano ==
- Three Symmetrical Preludes (1949–50)
- The Fiddlers (1952) (later arranged for string orchestra; accordion)
- Aleksanteri Könni (1952/1976)
- The Devil and the Drunkard (1952/1976)
- Icons (1955)
- Seven Preludes (1956)
- Apotheosis (1957), unpublished
- Partita (1956–58)
- Six Études (1969)
- Piano Sonata No. 1: Christus und die Fischer (1969)
- Piano Sonata No. 2: Tulisaarna (The Fire Sermon) (1970)
- Music for Upright Piano No. 1 (1976)
- Music for Upright Piano No. 2 (1976)
- Narcissus (2001)
- Passionale (2003)
- Fuoco (2007)
- Mirroring (2014)

== Organ ==
- Ta Tou Theou (That Which Comes From God), Op. 30 (1967)
- Laudatio trinitatis (1969/1970)
- Toccata, Op. 59 (1971)
- Häämarssi (Wedding March) (1984)

== Choral ==
- Suomalainen Rukouskirja (A Finnish Prayerbook) (1952)
- Laulupuu (Tree Song) (1952), unpublished
- Lapsen virret (Children's Tunes) (1952), unpublished
- Laulaja (The Singer), for male chorus (1956)
- Two Preludes by T. S. Eliot, for male chorus (1956/1967)
- Ludus verbalis, for speaking choir (1957)
- Ave Maria, for male chorus (1957)
- Missa duodecanonica, for children's choir (1963)
- Nattvarden (Ehtoollinen, Communion) (1963)
- Syksy virran suussa (Autumn at the River Mouth), for male chorus (1965/1995)
- Kaksi psalmia (Two psalms), for mixed chorus or male chorus (1967/1971)
- Praktisch Deutsch, motet for declamatory choir (1969)
- Vigilia (All-Night Vigil), for chorus and soloists (1971–72/1986)
- Credo, for mixed chorus (1972)
- Elämän kirja (Book of Life), for male chorus (1972)
- Viatonten valssi (Waltz of the Innocents), for children's choir, violin and piano (1973)
- Lorulei, for children's choir (1973)
- Kaksi taloa (Two Houses), for unison chorus and piano (1973)
- Kaksi kelmiä (Two Rogues), for children's choir (1973)
- Herran rukous (The Lord's Prayer) (1973)
- Isontalon Antti ja Rannanjärvi (Big House Andy and Lakeshore), for male chorus (1973)
- Hallin Janne (Janne of Halli), for male chorus (1973)
- Lorca Suite, for children's choir (1973)
- Morsian (The Bride) (1975)
- Lähto (Departure) (1975)
- Kettu ja sairas kukko (The Fox and the Sick Cock), for male chorus (1975)
- Sommarnatten (Summer Night), choral song (1975)
- Hammerskjöld-Fragment, for tenor soloist and male chorus (1975)
- Puusepän poika (The Carpenter's Son), for children's choir (1975)
- Kainuu, cantata for chorus, reciter and percussion (1975)
- Yxi ja kaxi (One and Two), for unison chorus (1975)
- Marjatan jouluvirsi (Marjatta's Christmas Hymn) (1975/1995)
- Joulun virsi, elämän virsi (Christmas Hymn, Hymn of Life), for male chorus (1953/1978) (arranged from Pyhia päiviä)
- Neljä serenadia (Four Serenades), for male chorus (1978)
- Canticum Mariae Virginis, for chorus a cappella (1978)
- Odotus (Waiting), for mixed choir, reciter and organ (1978)
- Lehdet lehtiä (Leaves are Leaves), for tenor soloist and male chorus (1979)
- Magnificat, for mixed chorus (1979)
- Nirvana Dharma, for chorus, soprano and flute (1979)
- Ylistyspsalmi (Psalm of Praise), for mixed chorus and organ (1979)
- Rakkaus ei koskaan häviä (Love never faileth), for children's choir (1983)
- The Cathedral (Katedralen), for chorus and soloists (1983)
- The First Runo, for women's choir (1984)
- Legenda, for male choir (1985)
- The Virgin's Lullaby, for female choir (1971/1986) (arranged from True and False Unicorn)
- I de stora skogarna (In the Great Wild Woodlands), for female choir and piano (1983-87/1993) (arranged from I min älsklings trädgård)
- Canción de nuestro tiempo (Song of Our Times) (1993)
- Och glädjen den dansar (With Joy We Go Dancing) (1993)
- Die Erste Elegie (1993)
- Wenn sich die Welt auftut (When the World Opens Up), for female chorus (1996)
- Halavan himmeän alla (In the Shade of the Willow), choral song (1998) (adapted from Aleksis Kivi)
- Nelja romanssia oopperasta Rasputin (Four Romances from the Opera Rasputin), for male chorus (2003/2006)
- Our Joyful'st feast, for chorus (2008)
- Unsere Liebe, for mixed chorus (1996/2010)
- Missa a cappella, for mixed chorus (2010–11)
- Tapanin Virsi (Song of Stephen) (2011)
- Hommage vanhalle säveltäjälle (Hommage to an Old Composer), for male chorus (2014)
- Orpheus singt (2016)

== Choral with orchestra ==
- Itsenäisyyskantaatti (Independence Cantata), for soloist, reciter, mixed choir and orchestra (1967)
- True & False Unicorn, cantata (1971/2000)
- Children's Mass (Lapsimessu), for children's choir and orchestra (1973)
- Parantaja (The Healer), for chorus and orchestra (1981)
- Katso minun kansani on puu (Behold, My People are a Tree), cantata for chorus and orchestra with accordion (1991)
- On the Last Frontier, fantasy for chorus and orchestra (1997)
- Four Songs from Rasputin, for male chorus and orchestra (2012)
- Balada, cantata for tenor, choir and orchestra (2015)

== Vocal ==
- Ensi lumen aikaan (Time of First Snow) (1947)
- Three Sonnets of Shakespeare (1951/2005)
- Madrigalen (1952), unpublished
- Pyhiä päiviä (Sacred Feasts) (1953)
- Fúnf Sonette an Orpheus (Five Sonnets to Orpheus) (1955–56/1960)
- Hajoaminen (Disintegration) (1957), unpublished
- Die Liebenden (The Lovers) (1958–59)
- Orpheus Sonnets, Zweiter Zyklus (1958–61), unpublished
- 14 Sånger till dikter av Bo Setterlind (1962), unpublished
- Guds väg (God's Way) (1964)
- In vinternatten (In a Winter Night) (1969)
- Dream World (Maailman uneen) (1972, 1982/1997)
- Almanakka kahdelle (Almanac for Two) (1973/1998), for two voices and piano
- Ilmarisen lento (The Flight of Ilmarinen) (1976)
- Matka (The Trip) (1977)
- I min älsklings trädgård (In My Beloved's Garden) (1983–87)
- Minä en puhu minä laulan (I Don't Speak, I Sing) (1986)
- Sinulle minä antaisin auringonkukka (To You I Would Give Sun Flowers) (1986)
- Eron hetki on kalveakasvo (The Moment of Parting is a Pale Mask) (1997) (rearranged from "Charlotta's Monologue" from Aleksis Kivi)
- Nelja laulua oopperasta Aleksis Kivi (Four Songs from the Opera Aleksis Kivi) (1997)
- Eingang (Entrance) (2009), for soprano and string quartet
- In the Stream of Life (2013) (reorchestration of seven songs by Sibelius for baritone and orchestra)
- Rubáiyát (2013)

== Electronic tape ==
- Number 1 & 2 (1980)
- Heureka 1 & 2 (1989)

== Withdrawn/Lost Works ==
- Concerto for Winds (1950)
- Dramatic Overture, for orchestra (1951)
- Tema con tre variazioni (Theme with Three Variations), for orchestra (1952)
- Andante moderato, for orchestra (1952)
- Symphonic Suite, for orchestra (1953)
- Piano Concerto No. 0 (1955)
- Praevariata, for orchestra (1957)
- The Water Circle, An Homage to Lao-Tzu, for chorus, piano and orchestra (1972)
- The Finn Way, for orchestra (1973)
- Kasvaa–kehittyä–muuttua (Growth–Development–Variation), for orchestra (1974)
- Notturno, for flute and string quartet (1981)
