= Piano Concerto No. 3 (Rautavaara) =

- Gift of Dreams
- by Einojuhani Rautavaara
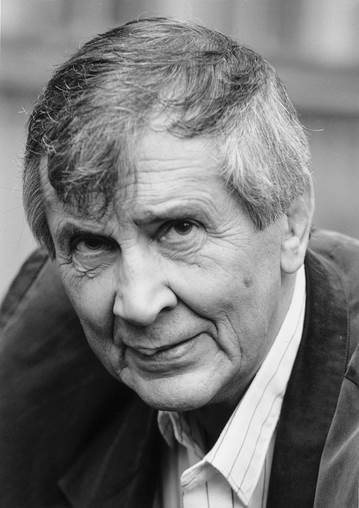
- Rautavaara, c. 2000
- Composed: 1998
- Movements: 3
- Scoring: Piano concerto

Einojuhani Rautavaara wrote his Piano Concerto No. 3 (subtitled Gift of Dreams) in 1998, nine years after his previous concerto.

The work was commissioned by the eminent conductor/pianist Vladimir Ashkenazy as a concerto which could be conducted from behind the piano, with Ashkenazy serving as soloist and conductor simultaneously. Ashkenazy did premiere the concerto in this dual role with the Helsinki Philharmonic Orchestra in 1999. He has since toured around the world performing the concerto, subsequently recording it on Ondine, a Finnish record company.

The work is in three movements, with a poignant central adagio. The work adopts tonal harmonies, as in Rautavaara's Piano Concerto No. 1, but the overall mood is much more calm and serene.

== Structure ==
The piano concerto is in three movements, and plays for 25 to 30 minutes:

1. Tranquillo (10 minutes)
2. Adagio assai (12 minutes)
3. Energico (6 minutes)

== Instrumentation ==
Woodwinds

2 flutes
2 oboes
2 clarinets in B♭
2 bassoons

Brass

4 horns in F
2 trumpets in C
2 trombones

Percussion

timpani

vibraphone
tubular bells
gong (30')
tam-tam (60')
gran cassa
side drum
4 tom-toms
xylophone

Keyboards

solo piano

Strings

violins I
violins II
violas
cellos
double basses

== Recordings ==
- Vladimir Ashkenazy (pianist/conductor), Helsinki Philharmonic Orchestra, Ondine, Inc. (record company)
- Laura Mikkola (pianist), Netherlands Radio Symphony Orchestra, Eri Klas (conductor), Naxos (record company)
