= Towards the Horizon (composition) =

Cello concerto by the Finnish composer Einojuhani Rautavaara

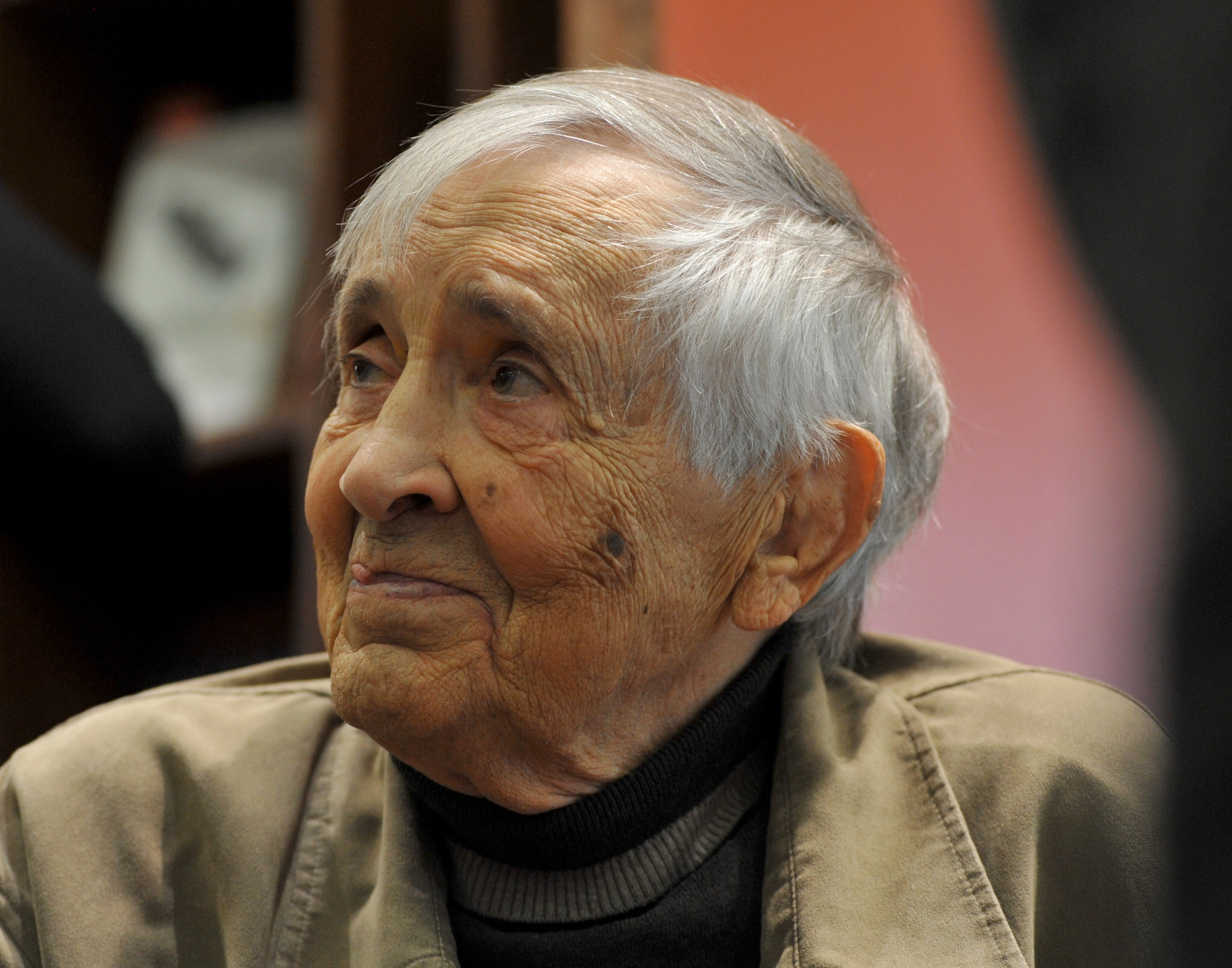
Einojuhani Rautavaara in 2014

Towards the Horizon is the second cello concerto by the Finnish composer Einojuhani Rautavaara. The work was commissioned by the Minnesota Orchestra under the direction of Osmo Vänskä. It was first performed by the cellist Arek Tesarczyk and the Minnesota Orchestra conducted by Osmo Vänskä in Orchestra Hall, Minneapolis, on September 30, 2010. The piece is dedicated to the cellist Truls Mørk, who was originally scheduled to perform the world premiere, but had to drop out due to health concerns.

== Composition ==
Towards the Horizon has a duration of roughly 20 minutes and is composed in one continuous movement. It was written between 2008 and 2009 and was the composer's last concerto before his death in July 2016. Rautavaara anticipated this event in the score program notes, reflecting, "Of my twelve concertos the first was for cello, and now again a cello concerto may end the series."

=== Instrumentation ===
The work is scored for a solo cello and an orchestra comprising two flutes, two oboes, two clarinets, two bassoons, four horns, two trumpets, timpani, percussion, and strings.

== Reception ==
Reviewing the world premiere, Larry Fuchsberg of the Star Tribune opined, "Towards the Horizon' won't enjoy the popularity of Rautavaara's Seventh Symphony or his Cantus Arcticus. The music never hurries. Rhythmic interest is slight, harmonic interest substantial: The concerto has a dissonant lushness, at times suggesting a Hollywood film score that's taken an odd turn."

Reviewing a recording of the work by Truls Mørk and the Helsinki Philharmonic Orchestra, Tom Huizenga of NPR wrote, "Written for Norwegian cellist Truls Mørk [...], the concerto unfolds as a long, romantic song, with barely a breath in the cello line. The nearly constant outpouring of lyricism includes achingly beautiful passages sung in the cello's very highest register in the finale." Hilary Finch of BBC Music Magazine similarly observed, "Truls Mørk's free and graceful flights of endlessly varying and regenerating melody come after a powerful pentatonic opening theme, almost Sibelian in strength. The cello's voice, both dreamlike and impassioned, is accompanied in its flight by avian woodwind, buffeted here and there by storm clouds of timpani." Guy Rickards of Gramophone further remarked:

The near-unbroken line of the cello part, which sings almost without pause, it seems, helps to make the main set of variations in the central span a seamless entity. Given the valedictory nature of the music, the magical close fading out high into the air like a modern retake on The Lark Ascending, there is a temptation to see in this work the composer's direct contemplation of the infinite – his equivalent perhaps of Shostakovich's late quartets, but decidedly more positive and serene in expression (yet unblinkingly clear).

== Recording ==
A recording of the work, performed by Truls Mørk and the Helsinki Philharmonic Orchestra conducted by John Storgårds, was released through Ondine on February 28, 2012. The album also features recordings of Rautavaara's orchestral suite Modificata and his percussion concerto Incantations.
