= Thomas (opera) =

Thomas is a 1985 Finnish-language opera in three acts by Einojuhani Rautavaara to a libretto by the composer based on the life of Thomas, 13th Century bishop of Finland.

== Recording ==
- Thomas: – Jorma Hynninen (baritone – Thomas, Bishop of Finland), Sini Rautavaara (soprano – Maiden), Peter Lindroos (tenor – Johann von Gobyn, Knight of the Sword), Matti Piipponen (tenor – Mäster Styver, a Merchant from Gotland) Joensuu City Orchestra, Savonlinna Opera Festival Chorus, Pekka Haapasalo (conductor)
