= The Gift of the Magi (disambiguation) =

"The Gift of the Magi" is a 1905 short story by O. Henry.

The Gift of the Magi may also refer to:

== Musical theatre ==
- The Gift of the Magi, a 1958 musical by Richard Adler
- The Gift of the Magi, a 1995 musical by Mark St. Germain and Randy Courts

== Opera ==
- The Gift of the Magi (Rautavaara opera), 1994
- The Gift of the Magi (Conte opera), 1997

== Other uses ==
- The gifts of the Magi (gold, frankincense, and myrrh) to Jesus
- Mickey and Minnie's Gift of the Magi, the third segment of the 1999 American film Mickey's Once Upon a Christmas
- "The Gift of the Magi" (Fargo), a television episode

== See also ==
- "Grift of the Magi", an episode of the television series The Simpsons
