= Piano Concerto No. 2 (Rautavaara) =

- by Einojuhani Rautavaara
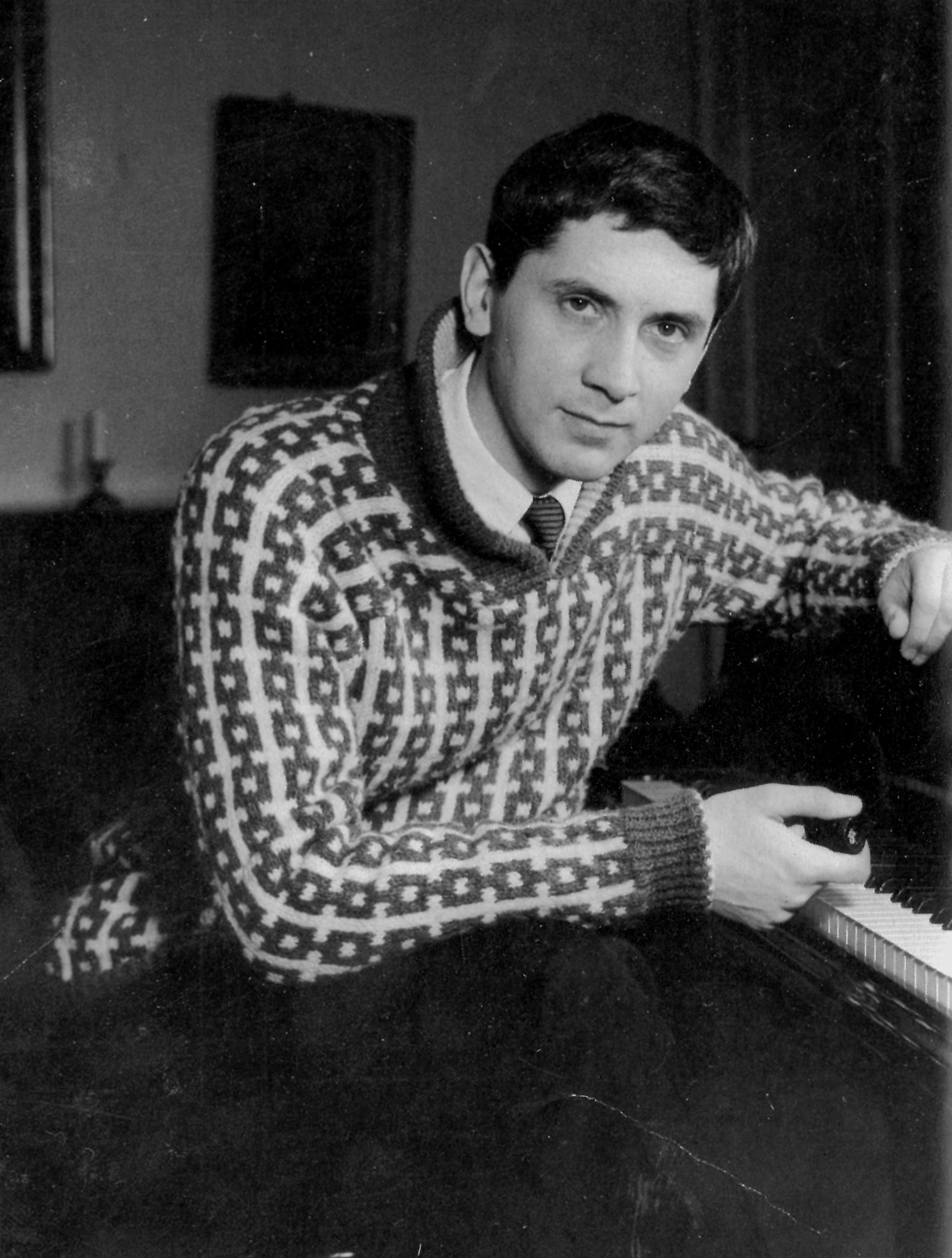
- Photo of Einojuhani Rautavaara in the 1950s
- Composed: 1989
- Movements: 3
- Scoring: Piano concerto

Einojuhani Rautavaara wrote his Piano Concerto No. 2 in 1989. The work is in three linked movements, with the central slow movement longer than the outer movements combined. Although the work employs serial procedures, the style of piano writing is deeply rooted in the Romantic tradition combined with Rautavaara's idiosyncratic mysticism.

== Movements ==
The concerto is in three linked movements, and plays for 20–25 minutes.

1. In Viaggio
2. Sognando e libero
3. Uccelli sulle passioni

== Structure ==
The first movement (In Viaggio) opens with the pianist playing soft, rippling figurations, accompanied by fragmentary calls by woodwinds. The strings then introduce a passionate theme, but the piano soon takes over the theme, which rises higher and higher. The passionate strings re-enter, with rhythmic interjections from brass and percussion, and the music rises to a climax. The piano lunges into the lowest registers, linking into the slow movement (Sognando e libero).

The piano starts off solo with a simple melody with accompanying chords in the left hand, and the strings and woodwinds soon join in the peaceful repose. The piano exchanges dialogues with different instruments of the orchestra, but the music soon becomes agitated, leading into a central toccata-like episode, the music sometimes harsh, sometimes soft and bell-like. The agitation soon disperses and the initial tranquility is resumed with a reflective piano solo. Brass interjections, however, confer a sense of insecurity.

The last movement (Uccelli sulle passioni) opens with a subdued interplay between piano, castanets, and pizzicato strings. The rippling piano figurations and passionate string theme from the first movement return, with added "bird sounds" from the highest registers of the piano and also low woodwinds. The passion dissipates into silence after the clarinets give out their last "bird-calls".

== Instrumentation ==
Woodwinds
1 Flute
1 Oboe
2 Clarinets (second doubling Bass Clarinet)
2 Bassoons (second doubling Contrabassoon)
Brass
4 Horns
3 Trumpets
Percussion
Timpani
2 Additional Percussionists
Strings

== Recordings ==
- Laura Mikkola (pianist), Netherlands Radio Symphony Orchestra, Eri Klas (conductor), Naxos (record company)
- Ralf Gothoni (pianist), Leipzig Radio Symphony Orchestra, Max Pommer (conductor), Ondine (record company)
