= Aleksis Kivi (opera) =

Aleksis Kivi (1995–96) is an opera in two acts by Einojuhani Rautavaara, to a libretto by the composer. It was first performed by the Savonlinna Opera Festival on 8 July 1997, with Jorma Hynninen in the title role. The opera deals with episodes in the life of Aleksis Kivi, the Finnish national writer. The opera was written at the request of Hynninen, who sang the title role at the premiere.

Kivi's texts, often considered as some of the first major literary works in the Finnish language are found within the work, along with writings from a critic of Kivi's, August Ahlqvist, who often wrote under the pen name Oksanen.

Rautavaara later made a new version of the opera, which premiered at the Finnish National Opera in September 2009. He has also arranged excerpts for choir.

== Roles ==
Role	Voice Type	Premiere cast, 12 September 2009 Conductor: Mikko Franck
Aleksis Kivi	baritone	Jorma Hynninen
Eno Sakeri	bass	Matti Turunen
Charlotta	mezzo-soprano	Riikka Rantanen
Hilda	soprano	Pauliina Linnosaari
Junki	tenor	Aki Alamikkotervo
Mikko Vilkastus	tenor	Aki Alamikkotervo
Vanha Pakana	bass	Matti Turunen
Young Aleksis	baritone	Ville Rusanen
August Ahlqvist	spoken	Timo Torikka

== Recordings ==
- Rautavaara: Aleksis Kivi 2CD 2002 Jorma Hynninen, Lasse Pöysti, Eeva-Liisa Saarinen, Helena Juntunen, Gabriel Suovanen, Marcus Groth, Lassi Virtanen, Jaakko Hietikko Jyväskylä Sinfonia, Markus Lehtinen Ondine Records.
- Rautavaara: Aleksis Kivi DVD Jorma Hynninen (Aleksis Kivi), Janne Reinikainen (August Ahlqvist), Riikka Rantanen (Charlotta), Pauliina Linnosaari (Hilda), Ville Rusanen (Young Alexis) & Tobias Zilliacus (J.L. Runeberg) Finnish National Opera Orchestra, conducted Mikko Franck Ondine
