= Jorma Hynninen =

Finnish opera singer

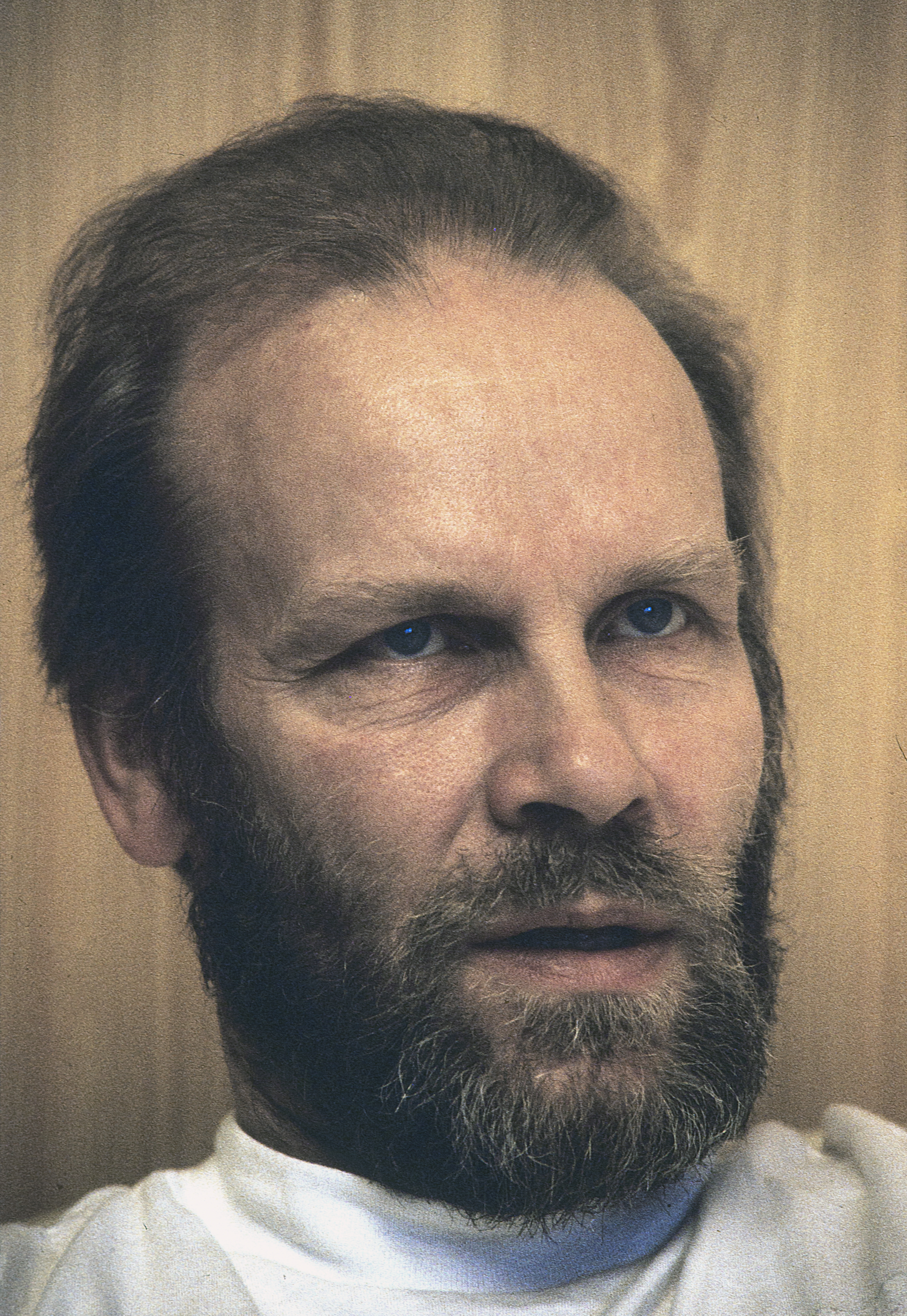
Jorma Hynninen in 1990

Jorma Kalervo Hynninen (born 3 April 1941) is a Finnish baritone who performs regularly with the world's major opera companies. He has also worked in opera administration.

== Life and career ==
Hynninen was born on 3 April 1941 in Leppävirta, Finland. He studied from 1966 to 1970 at the Sibelius Academy in Helsinki and also took lessons from Luigi Ricci in Rome and Kurt Overhoff in Salzburg. In 1969 he won first prize the Lappeenranta Solo Voice Competition and made his opera debut with the Finnish National Opera as Silvio in Leoncavallo's Pagliacci.

Hynninen sang his first public concert in 1970 in Helsinki and was a permanent member of the Finnish National Opera, where he until 1990. In 1971 he took first prize in the Scandinavian Singing Competition in Helsinki and in 1996 won the Cannes Classical Award.

On the opera stage, his notable roles have included Count Almaviva in Mozart's Le nozze de Figaro, Tchaikovsky's Eugene Onegin, and Pelléas in Debussy's Pelléas and Mélisande, the role in which he made his debut at the Paris Opera, and which he sang frequently at the Hamburg State Opera.

Hynninen first came to notice in the United States in 1980 with his debut at New York's Carnegie Recital Hall. In 1984 he made his Metropolitan debut as Rodrigo in Don Carlos. In 1987 he was hailed as a "perfect Wolfram" in the Met's Tannhäuser. His international career includes performances at the Vienna Opera, Milan's La Scala, the Bavarian State Opera in Munich, as well as Hamburg, Barcelona, Geneva, and Berlin.

He has also served as Artistic Director of the Finnish National Opera from 1984 to 1990 and later became artistic director of the Savonlinna Opera Festival in Finland. Since 1996, he has been Professor of Voice at the Sibelius Academy in Helsinki. In addition, between 1980 and 1991 he was Artistic Director of the Joensuu Song Festival. His daughter Laura Hynninen was 2013 to 2015 the principal harpist of Finnish Radio Symphony Orchestra.

Hynninen has combined his operatic career with regular appearances in the concert hall with the world's leading orchestras and maestros such as Seiji Ozawa, Kurt Masur, and Esa-Pekka Salonen and in recital in the major cities of Europe and North America.

He has supported the music of his native Finland as well. He performed the title role in the world premiere of Aleksis Kivi by Einojuhani Rautavaara at the Savonlinna Opera Festival. He participated in the world premiere of an operatic trilogy of Aika ja uni (The Age of Dreams) by three Finnish composers: Herman Rechberger (b. 1947), Olli Kortekangas (b. 1955), and Kalevi Aho (b. 1949) on the stage of Olavinlinna Castle on 15 July 2000. He also sang in the premiere of Sallinen's Kuningas Lear in 2000 (Gloucester).

Hynninen's discography includes more than a hundred titles. He has recorded Finnish opera extensively along with works from the international repertoire, lieder collections, and religious music.

== Select discography ==
- Brahms: Ein Deutsches Requiem, with Klaus Tennstedt (EMI)
- Dallapiccola: Il prigioniero (The Prisoner) (title role), with Esa-Pekka Salonen and the Swedish Radio Symphony Orchestra (Sony)
- Mozart: Le nozze di Figaro (Count Almaviva), with Riccardo Muti (EMI)
- Beethoven / Mozart / Wagner / Mussorgsky: Opera Scenes (Naxos)
- Nummi: Kevätteiltä (From Spring Roads, song cycle) with Ralf Gothóni (BIS)
- Sallinen: Elaman ja kuoleman lauluja (Songs of Life and Death), Op. 69 Helsinki Philharmonic Orchestra, Okko Kamu (Ondine)
- Schubert: Winterreise, Op. 89, (Fuga) and Die schöne Müllerin D.795 (Ondine)
- Sibelius: The Maiden in the Tower (Bailiff) (1983, BIS)
- Sibelius: Orchestral Songs (Naxos)
- Mahler: Symphony No. 8 in E flat major 'Symphony of a Thousand', with the London Philharmonic Orchestra, Klaus Tennstedt
- Sibelius: Kullervo, Op. 7, with the Helsinki Philharmonic conducted by Paavo Berglund (1985, EMI); Göteborgs Symfoniker conducted by Neeme Järvi (1985, BIS), Los Angeles Philharmonic conducted by Esa-Pekka Salonen (1992, Sony), Finnish Radio Symphony Orchestra conducted by Jukka-Pekka Saraste (1996, Finlandia)
- Sibelius: Sibelius Edition, Vol. 3 – Voice and Orchestra (Naxos)
- Rautavaara: Vincent (title role), with Fuat Mansurov and the Finnish National Opera Orchestra and Chorus (Ondine)
- Sallinen: Kullervo (title role), with Ulf Söderblom and the Finnish National Opera and Chorus (Ondine)
- Sallinen: The Red Line (Topi), with Okko Kamu and the Finnish National Opera and Chorus (Finlandia) plus DVD of 2008 Helsinki production conducted by Mikko Franck (Ondine)
- Strauss, R: Elektra (Orest), Boston Symphony Orchestra, Seiji Ozawa

== Sources ==
- New York Times: "Opera Festival Chiefs Who Can Sing, Too", July 15, 1993, accessed Jan. 1, 2010
- New York Times: "Nurturing Operatic Talent With a Kind Of Tough Love", July 28, 2002, accessed Jan. 1, 2010
- New York Times: "Finnish Opera Offers Sallinen's 'Red Line'", April 29, 1983, accessed Jan. 1, 2010
- New York Times: "Rasputin, From Top to Bottom", September 14, 2003, accessed Jan. 1, 2010
- New York Times: "From Finland, an International Baritone", Sept. 30, 1984, accessed Jan. 1, 2010
