= Rasputin (opera) =

2003 Finnish-language opera by Einojuhani Rautavaara

- Opera by Einojuhani Rautavaara
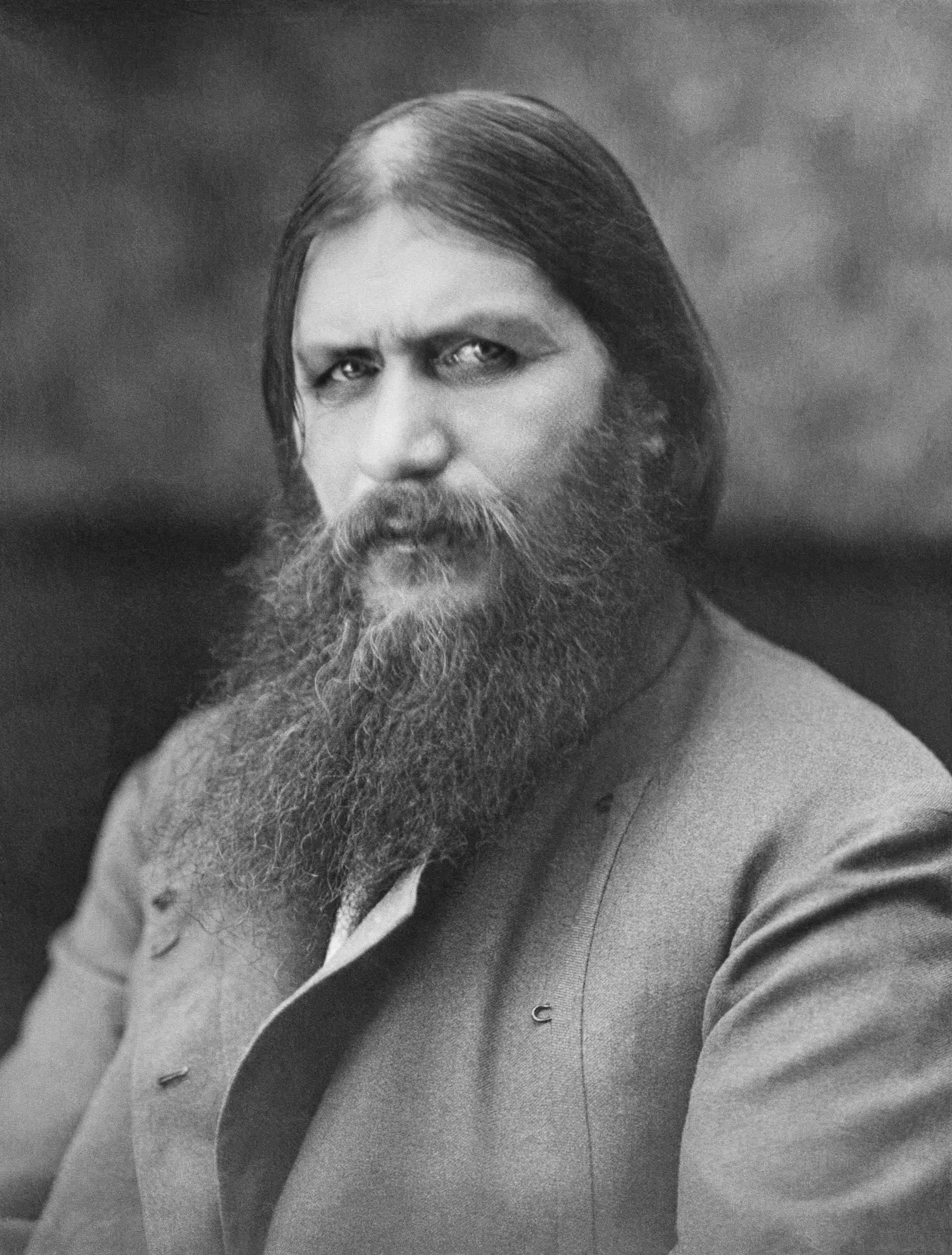
- Portrait of Rasputin c. 1910
- Language: Finnish
- Premiere: September 19, 2003; Finnish National Opera and Ballet

Rasputin is a 2003 Finnish-language opera in three acts by Einojuhani Rautavaara.

== Roles ==
Roles, voice types, premiere cast
Role	Voice type	Premiere cast, 19 September 2003 Conductor: Mikko Franck
Grigori Rasputin	bass	Matti Salminen
Alexandra Feodorovna "Alix"	mezzo-soprano	Lilli Paasikivi
Nikolai "Niki"	baritone	Jorma Hynninen
Felix Yusupov	tenor	Jyrki Anttila
Irina Yusupova	mezzo-soprano	Riikka Rantanen
Dimitri Pavlovich	baritone	Gabriel Suonaven
Vladimir Purishkevich	bass	Jyrki Korhonen
Ania Vyrubova (Lady of the Court)	soprano	Ritva-Liisa Korhonen
Botkin (doctor)	bass	Jaakko Heitikko
Lazavert (doctor)	tenor	Aki Alamikkotervo
Iliodor (monk)	baritone	Saulli Tiilikainen
Hermogen (bishop)	bass	Kai Valtonen
Mitja Kozelskilainen (yurodivy)	tenor	Lassi Virtanen
Anastasia	soprano	Anna-Kristiina Kaappola
Maria	soprano	Helena Juntunen
Tatiana	mezzo-soprano	Tulja Knitila
Olga	mezzo/alto	Sari Aittokoski
Aleksei	speaking role	Anton Saares
The Crowd, Khlysts, Romani people, The pub crowd

== Synopsis ==
=== Act I ===
The Tsarevich, Alexei, has hemophilia, and the family doctors can find no solution. Tsarina Alexandra (Alix)’s lady-in-waiting, Anna, recommends for them to call upon Father Grigori Rasputin. Rasputin soothes the Tsarevich by describing his homeland of Siberia, temporarily lessening his condition. Alix believes this to be a miracle, and from that point forward his influence grows. Rasputin comforts Alix, and there are romantic implications. Then, Khlysts appear and begin to perform a ritual dance. Rasputin eventually sinks into the middle of the crowd, proclaiming that “sin redeems us”. Meanwhile, Irina is being courted by Felix Yusupov and Dmitri Pavlovich. There are numerous rumors surrounding Felix and Dmitri, claiming that they're a homosexual couple. Irina discusses this and more with Tsar Nicolas, and he monologues about his worries as Tsar and Father. The act ends with Anna having a terrible feeling about what is going to happen.

=== Act II ===
It is Easter night. Iliodor, a hieromonk, and Mitya, a yurodivy (holy fool), preach to the people in a very fire-and-brimstone manner. The bishop Hermogen arrives and they lead a processional to the church. The doors open from the inside and Rasputin emerges, Hermogen remarking that he is “Like Satan himself”. Felix and Dmitri discuss their courting of Irina and flirt. They then conspire with Vladimir Purishkevich to kill Rasputin. They find it deeply offensive that an “uneducated peasant” has so much control over the royals and Russia in general. Felix also wants Russia to join the war against the Turks, which Rasputin vehemently opposes, knowing that it will further strain Russia. Meanwhile, Rasputin leads what is practically a sex cult, preaching that without sin there is no redemption. He has his way with a couple of the women and starts to drink. Then, multiple guests appear, among them Felix (crossdressing), Dmitri, and Vladimir. Vladimir points his gun at Rasputin's back multiple times, but each time he evades him. Rasputin, now completely drunk, rants about ruling Russia with the tsarina, dissolving the parliament, and other delusions. The three assassins eventually flee, and Rasputin blacks out. Iliodor and Mitya discuss Rasputin's debauchery and they read a letter that seemingly condemns him as being in a relationship with the Tsarina. One of the women from the earlier scene, Gina Guseva, appears and begs the monk to allow her to kill Rasputin, and he gives her a knife. They confront Rasputin. He admits to his sins, and they call him a devil. Guseva stabs Rasputin, and they cry “Die, Antichrist!”

=== Act III ===
Rasputin is recovering in the hospital. He is surrounded by women. When night falls, he freaks out and believes he is being once again tempted by Satan. He sings once again about how “Lovely sin” must take place before repentance, in a kind of fever dream. Felix is with Irina and inquires about her feelings in a feverish blur of emotions. She says she is with him now and forever, which he is elated by. He then tells her that he plans to kill Rasputin, and she needs to be the bait. She does not want any part of this and leaves. Felix then collapses from ecstasy. In a dream, or perhaps a nightmare, he sees Rasputin, who with his eyes paralyzes him. We see the Tsar, his family, and the doctors again. They are still unable to do anything about Alexei so Alix calls upon Rasputin again. He soothes Alexei into a slumber, and then he manipulates Alix into accepting bribes from various politicians. Alix has a beautiful monologue about the darkening future. Felix, Dmitri, and Vladimir are preparing to kill Rasputin. They poison cookies and wine and prepare the gun. Rasputin arrives and asks about Irina's whereabouts. Felix says she is entertaining and offers him the cookies. Rasputin refuses. He offers him the wine. This time he accepts, but is seemingly unaffected by the poison. Felix eventually shoots Rasputin. The assassins remark that they have saved Russia, but Felix isn't so sure. He goes to check on the body and sure enough, Rasputin awakes, grabbing on to him and trying to escape. Vladimir shoots multiple times, eventually killing him. Alix has a premonition of the Romanovs’ fate, with Rasputin condemning them and telling them to flee.

== Recordings ==
- DVD Matti Salminen (Grigori Rasputin), Lilli Paasikivi (Alexandra Fyodorovna), Jorma Hynninen (Tsar Nicholas), Riikka Rantanen (Irina Yusupova), Ritva-Liisa Korhonen (Anna Vyrubova), Jyrki Anttila (Felix Yusupov), Gabriel Suovanen (Dimitri Pavlovich), Jyrki Korhonen (Vladimir Purishkevich), Finnish National Opera Orchestra and Chorus, Mikko Franck. Ondine 2006
