= Jyväskylä Sinfonia =

The Jyväskylä Sinfonia is a Finnish chamber orchestra based in Jyväskylä. The orchestra principally performs concerts at the Paviljonki, the conference center of the municipality. The orchestra also gives concerts at the Taulumäki Church (Taulumäen Kirkko) in Jyväskylä, and has participated in the Jyväskylä Summer Festival, the Turku Music Festival, and in the Jorma Panula Conducting Competition.

== History ==
The Jyväskylä Orchestra Association established the orchestra in 1955, with Ahti Karjalainen as its first chief conductor, serving from 1955 to 1958. The orchestra gave concerts at the Jyväskylä City Theatre (Jyväskylän kaupunginteatteri). The municipality of Jyväskylä incorporated the orchestra in 1965. In the early years of the orchestra, about 15 permanent musicians constituted the core of the orchestra, with deputies or freelance musicians used for concerts which required larger ensembles. In the reminiscences of orchestra oboist Tauno Hämäläinen, who was a member of the orchestra from 1966 to 2009. Over time, the orchestra reduced and phased out the deputy system over time, leading to an improvement in the orchestras quality. From 1988 to 1999, the orchestra operated as a limited liability company. In 1999, the municipality incorporated the orchestra under its auspices for the second time.

Past principal guest conductors of the orchestra have included Moshe Atzmon (2014-2016). From 2022 to 2024, the string quartet Meta4 collectively held the post of principal guest conductor of the orchestra, with duties divided among the four musicians. In December 2023, the orchestra moved into the Encore-salissa (Encore Hall) of the Jyväskylä Pavilion as its new permanent home, with over twice the seating capacity of the Jyväskylä City Theatre (551 seats).

In the spring of 2023, Lorenzo Passerini first guest-conducted the orchestra. In October 2023, the orchestra announced the appointment of Passerini as its next chief conductor, with an initial contract of three years.

Past managing directors of the orchestra have included Emma Anttila, who held the post from 2013 to 2024. The current managing director of the orchestra is Eeva-Maria Kopp, whom the orchestra selected in 2025.

The orchestra has recorded for such commercial labels as Ondine and for Naxos. The Jyväskylä Sinfonia was the first to record Einojuhani Rautavaara's Aleksis Kivi. Other recording projects included a collaboration with baritone Waltteri Torikka on his debut album Sydän.

== Chief conductors ==
- Ahti Karjalainen (1955–1958)
- Jukka Hapuoja (1958–1963)
- Ahti Karjalainen (1963–1969)
- Onni Kelo (1970–1977)
- Jorma Svanström (1977–1980)
- Kyösti Haatanen (1980–1986)
- William Boughton (1987–1992)
- Ari Rasilainen (1993–1997)
- Markus Lehtinen (1999–2002)
- Patrick Gallois (2003–2012)
- Ville Matvejeff (2014–2023)
- Lorenzo Passerini (2024-present)
