= Markus Fagerudd =

Finnish composer

Markus Simon Fagerudd (born 1 June 1961) is a Finnish composer.

Fagerudd was born in Jakobstad, Finland. In the 1980s, he studied composition at the Sibelius Academy in Helsinki under Olli Kortekangas and Kalevi Aho, while working as a musician and composer at the KOM-Theatre. He studied at the Karlsruhe Music Academy from 1993 to 1994 under Wolfgang Rihm. He was composer in residence with the Lappeenranta City Orchestra, and since 1997 he has been the composer in residence with the Vaasa City Orchestra.

Fagerudd's varied musical output includes works for solo instruments, chamber and symphony orchestras, and choirs. His best-known works include his children's operas commissioned by the Finnish National Opera and the Savonlinna Opera Festival: Gaia; Strawhat, Feltslipper and the Big Bang ("Heinähattu, Vilttitossu ja suuri pamaus"); and The Seven Dog Brothers ("Seitsemän koiraveljestä").
