= Op. 45 =

In music, Op. 45 stands for Opus number 45. Compositions that are assigned this number include:

- Beach – Piano Concerto
- Berkeley – A Dinner Engagement
- Brahms – A German Requiem
- Britten – The Little Sweep
- Chopin – Prelude No. 25
- Fauré – Piano Quartet No. 2
- Grieg – Violin Sonata No. 3
- Kabalevsky – Piano Sonata No. 2
- Liebermann – The Picture of Dorian Gray
- Madetoja – The Ostrobothnians (Pohjalaisia), opera in three acts (1924)
- Mendelssohn – Cello Sonata No. 1
- Rachmaninoff – Symphonic Dances
- Rautavaara – Piano Concerto No. 1
- Saint-Saëns – Le Déluge
- Schumann – Romanzen & Balladen volume I (3 songs)
- Sibelius – The Dryad (Dryadi), tone poem for orchestra (1910)
- Tamberg – Cyrano de Bergerac
- Tchaikovsky – Capriccio Italien
