= Savonlinna Opera Festival =

Annual Finnish festival in Olavinlinna

Coordinates: 61°51′50″N 028°54′04″E

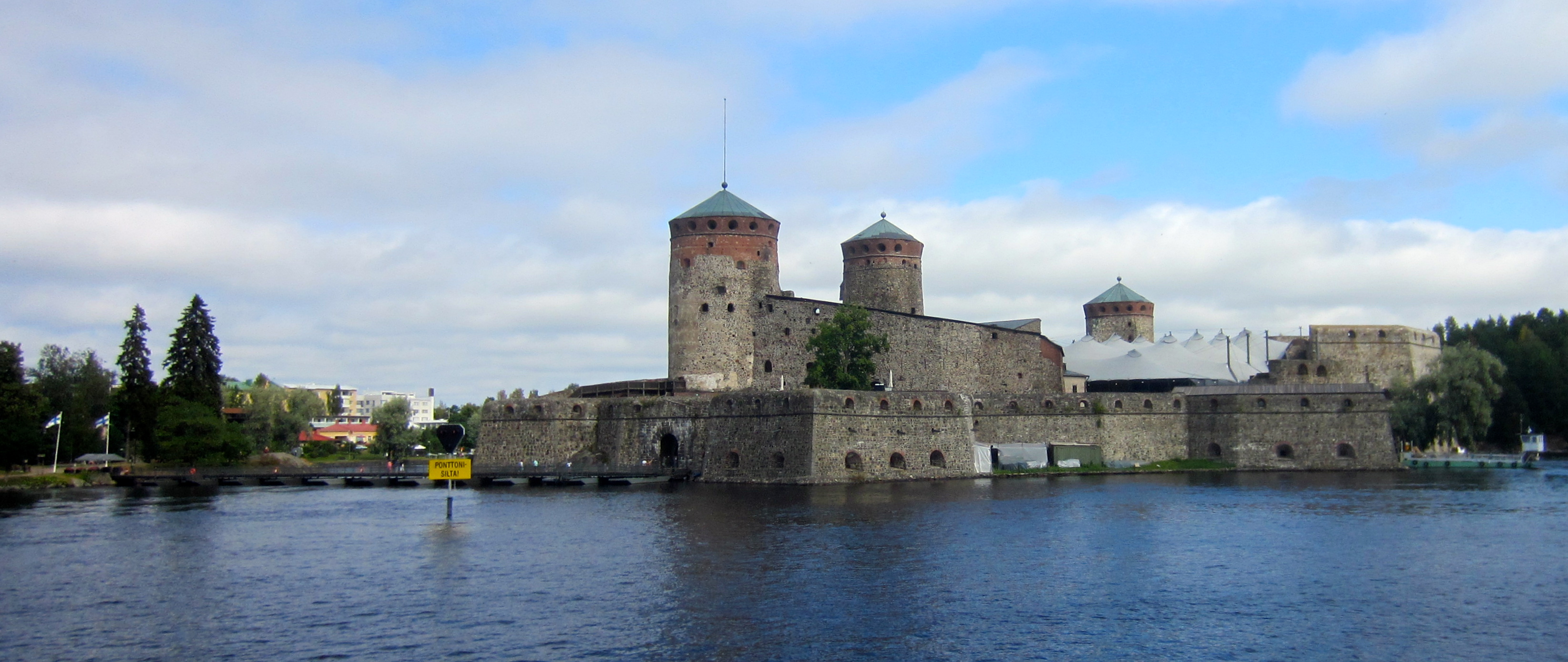
St. Olaf's Castle, the venue for the Opera Festival in Savonlinna.

Savonlinna Opera Festival (Finnish: Savonlinnan oopperajuhlat) is held annually in the city of Savonlinna in Finland. The Festival takes place at the medieval Olavinlinna (St. Olaf's Castle), built in 1475. The castle is located amid spectacular lake scenery.

== Origin ==
The birth of the Savonlinna Opera Festival ties in closely with the emerging Finnish identity and striving for independence at the beginning of the 20th century. Attending a nationalist meeting in Olavinlinna Castle in 1907, the Finnish soprano Aino Ackté, already famous at opera houses the world over and an ardent patriot, immediately spotted the potential of the castle as the venue for an opera festival.

The first opera festival was held in 1912. Aino Ackté directed the festival for five summers, staging four Finnish operas. The only opera by a non-Finnish composer was Charles Gounod’s Faust, with Ackté herself in the leading female role of Marguerite.

In 1917 the festival ran into difficulties because of First World War, Finnish Declaration of Independence and the ensuing Finnish Civil War.

For fifty years, the opera festival was dormant, but in 1967, Savonlinna Music Days decided to organise an opera course for young singers. The high point of the course was a performance of Beethoven's Fidelio in the castle. Therefore, 1967 is nowadays regarded as the start of the present Festival; since then it has had steady growth of both audience and reputation.

== Present-day festival ==
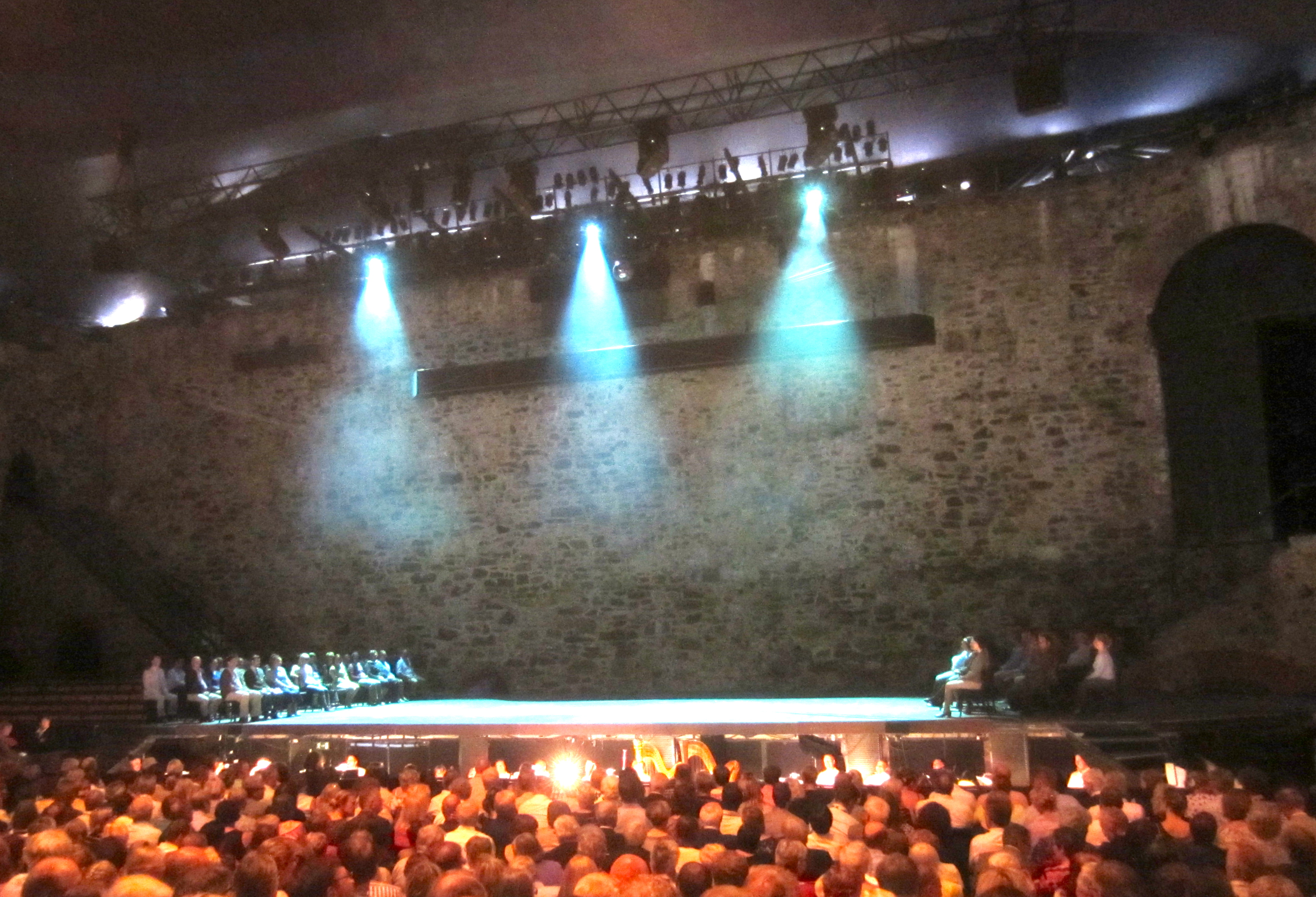
The stage at the courtyard of St. Olaf's Castle.

The Savonlinna Opera Festival has grown into an internationally recognised festival lasting a month. Each year it performs to a total audience of around 60,000, an estimated quarter of whom come from abroad. Each year the Festival has, in addition to staging leading works from classical operatic repertoire, staged its own productions.

=== Premieres ===
Thirteen operas have been premiered at the Savonlinna Opera Festival since 1967: The Horseman (1975), The King Goes Forth to France (1984, commissioned jointly by Covent Garden and the BBC), The Palace (1995) and Linna vedessä (2017) by Aulis Sallinen, The Knife (1989) by Paavo Heininen, Aleksis Kivi (1997) by Einojuhani Rautavaara, The Age of Dreams (2000–2001) by Herman Rechberger, Olli Kortekangas and Kalevi Aho, Koirien Kalevala (2004) by Jaakko Kuusisto, Hui kauhistus (2006) by Jukka Linkola, Isän tyttö (2007) by Olli Kortekangas, Seitsemän koiraveljestä (2008) by Markus Fagerudd, La Fenice (2012) by Kimmo Hakola, and Norppaooppera (2013) by Timo-Juhani Kyllönen.

=== Visits by foreign opera companies ===
For over a decade, the Savonlinna Opera Festival has hosted foreign opera companies: The first of these was the Estonia Theatre from Tallinn. This was followed for the next three seasons by the world-famous Mariinsky (Kirov) Theatre from St. Petersburg, by Covent Garden from London in 1998, the Opéra national du Rhin from Strasbourg in 1999, the New Israeli Opera in 2000, Los Angeles Opera in 2001, the Deutsche Oper am Rhein in 2002, and the Choir and Orchestra of the Municipal Theatre of Santiago in 2003, with a staging of Sergio Ortega's Fulgor y Muerte de Joaquín Murieta, after a libretto by Nobel Prize winner Pablo Neruda. The Welsh National Opera (UK) performed Nabucco and Manon Lescaut at the festival in 2014.

== See also ==
- List of opera festivals
