= Symphony No. 3 (Rautavaara) =

20th-century composition by Einojuhani Rautavaara

Finnish composer Einojuhani Rautavaara wrote his Symphony No. 3 (Op. 20) in 1959–60. Despite much of the material being derived from a twelve-tone row (after studying in Switzerland under Wladimir Vogel), the work remains tonal in character throughout. In fact, the romantic gestures of the symphony, the majestic use of brass (including Wagner Tubas), as well as the use of German tempo markings, owes much to the symphonies of Anton Bruckner, and the symphony has been termed by critics as neo-Brucknerian in style.

== Movements ==
A typical performance usually lasts around 30 minutes. The work is in four movements:

1. Langsam, breit, ruhig
2. Langsam, doch nicht schleppend
3. Sehr schnell
4. Bewegt

== Instrumentation ==
The symphony is scored for the following orchestra:

Woodwinds
2 flutes
2 oboes
2 clarinets in B♭
2 bassoons

Brass
2 horns in F
4 Wagner tubas (2 Tenor Tuba in B♭, 2 Bass Tuba in F)
2 trumpets in B♭
2 tenor trombones
1 bass trombone
1 tuba

Percussion
timpani
Strings
violins I, II
violas
cellos
double basses

== Premiere ==
Symphony No. 3 was premiered in Helsinki on 10 April 1962 by the Finnish Radio Symphony Orchestra conducted by Paavo Berglund.

== Recordings ==
Orchestra	Conductor	Record Company	Year of Recording	Format
Helsinki Philharmonic Orchestra	Leif Segerstam	Ondine Records	2007	CD/SACD hybrid
Royal Scottish National Orchestra	Hannu Lintu	Naxos Records	1997	CD
Leipzig Radio Symphony Orchestra	Max Pommer	Ondine Records	1988	CD
