= Symphony No. 8 (Rautavaara) =

1999 composition by Einojuhani Rautavaara

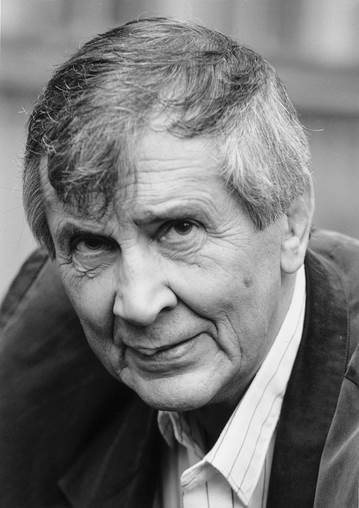
Einojuhani Rautavaara, c. 2000

Finnish composer Einojuhani Rautavaara wrote his Symphony No. 8, subtitled The Journey, in 1999. The total playing time is approximately 28 minutes.

There are four movements:

1. Adagio assai – Andante assai
2. Feroce –
3. Tranquillo
4. Con grandezza – Sciolto – Tempo I

== Instrumentation ==
Piccolo, 2 flutes, 2 oboes, English horn, 2 clarinets in B♭, bass clarinet, 2 bassoons, contrabassoon, 4 horns in F, 4 trumpets in C, 3 trombones, tuba, timpani, vibraphone, xylophone, glockenspiel, tubular bells, 4 tom-toms, cymbal (suspended), gong (30"), 3 tam-tams, 2 harps, strings.

== Premiere ==
Philadelphia Orchestra / Wolfgang Sawallisch, April 27, 2000

== Recordings ==
Rautavaara's symphony has been recorded four times since 1999.

| Orchestra | Conductor | Record Company | Year of Recording | Format |
|---|---|---|---|---|
| Helsinki Philharmonic Orchestra | Leif Segerstam | Ondine Records | 2001 | CD |
| Lahti Symphony Orchestra | Osmo Vänskä | BIS Records | 2004 | CD |
| New Zealand Symphony Orchestra | Pietari Inkinen | Naxos Records | 2006 | CD |
| Philadelphia Orchestra | Wolfgang Sawallisch | RM Associates / Image Entertainment (Region 1) | 2000 (First European Performance in Kölner Philharmonie) | DVD |
