= The Gift of the Magi (Rautavaara opera) =

1994 opera by Einojuhani Rautavaara

The Gift of the Magi (Finnish: Tietäjien lahja) is a 1994 chamber Christmas opera by Einojuhani Rautavaara. The libretto is based on the 1905 short story "The Gift of the Magi" by American author O. Henry which Rautavaara had first encountered in New York in 1955. However the story was changed from 1900 New York to the composer's own childhood in Helsinki's Kallio district in the 1930s.

== Recordings ==
- Rautavaara: Tietäjien lahja (sung in Finnish) Pia Freund, Jaakko Kortekangas Veräjäpelto Choir, Tapiola Sinfonietta, Petri Sakari, 2CDs Ondine
