= The House of the Sun (opera) =

Auringon talo is a 1990 Finnish-language chamber opera by Einojuhani Rautavaara.

== Recording ==
- The House of the Sun (sung in Finnish) Anna-Kristiina Kaappola, Raija Regnell, Mia Huhta, Helena Juntunen, Ulla Raiskio, Jukka Romu, Tuomas Katajala, Tommi Hakala, Markus Nieminen, Petri Bäckström Oulu Symphony Orchestra, Mikko Franck 2CD Ondine
