= Symphony No. 7 (Rautavaara) =

Symphony in four movements by Einojuhani Rautavaara

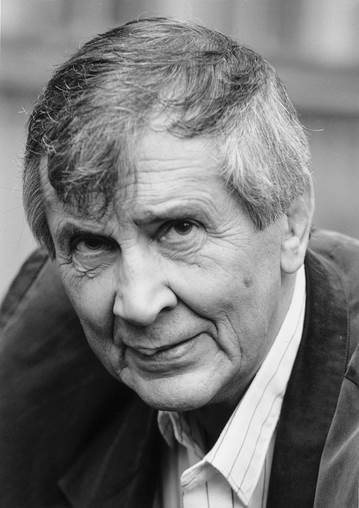
Einojuhani Rautavaara, c. 2000

Finnish composer Einojuhani Rautavaara wrote his Symphony No. 7, subtitled Angel of Light, in 1994. It was originally known as The Bloomington Symphony, as it was commissioned to celebrate the 25th anniversary of the founding of the Bloomington Symphony Orchestra. Belonging to his Angel Series, inspired by childhood dreams and revelations, the symphony has won wide popularity for its deep spirituality. The première performance was by the Bloomington Symphony Orchestra in 1994. In 1997, the première recording, by Leif Segerstam, was nominated for the Grammy Award for "Best Classical Contemporary Composition".

There are four movements:

1. Tranquillo (about 12 minutes)
2. Molto allegro (about 6 minutes)
3. Come un sogno (about 10 minutes)
4. Pesante –Cantabile (about 10 minutes)

== Instrumentation ==
Woodwinds

2 flutes
2 oboes
2 clarinets in B♭
2 bassoons

Brass

4 horns in F
3 trumpets in B♭
3 trombones
1 tuba

Percussion (4 players)

timpani

suspended cymbal
snare drum
glockenspiel
xylophone
marimba
vibraphone
tom-toms
tam-tams

Strings

harp

violin I
violin II
violas
cellos
double basses

== Recordings ==
Orchestra	Conductor	Record Company	Year of Recording	Format
Helsinki Philharmonic Orchestra	Leif Segerstam	Ondine Records	1995	CD
Lahti Symphony Orchestra	Osmo Vänskä	BIS Records	1999	CD
Royal Scottish National Orchestra	Hannu Koivula	Naxos Records	2001	CD

Reviewing Segerstam's version, Gramophone noted a "calm though powerful atmosphere, with many Sibelian points of reference, and stated that "Rautavaara’s language is more a celebration of nature and her works than of any specific religious ritual."

For Robert Layton, the symphony "finds the composer at his most imaginative"; Layton recommended Vänskä over Segerstam, as being "every bit as atmospheric and powerful and which can now be said to displace the former’s benchmark position... While attentive to every nuance and detail of colour, Vänskä also keeps the music moving and to my mind casts the stronger spell."

David Hurwitz judged that Segerstam had "the better orchestra," with "larger, lusher string sonorities," while Vänskä was "completely at home in the composer’s idiom, and if anything even better recorded than the competition"; and called Koivula's recording "expertly paced and confidently played."

Koivula's version "captures the mysticism of the musical language, while he also has a real grip on the structure," according to critic Terry Barfoot. Tim Ashley in the The Guardian called the Seventh "an awesome piece that juxtaposes passages of spiritual stasis with eruptive dissonances," and Koivula's recording "excellent."
