= Vincent (opera) =

1990 opera by Einojuhani Rautavaara

- Opera by Einojuhani Rautavaara
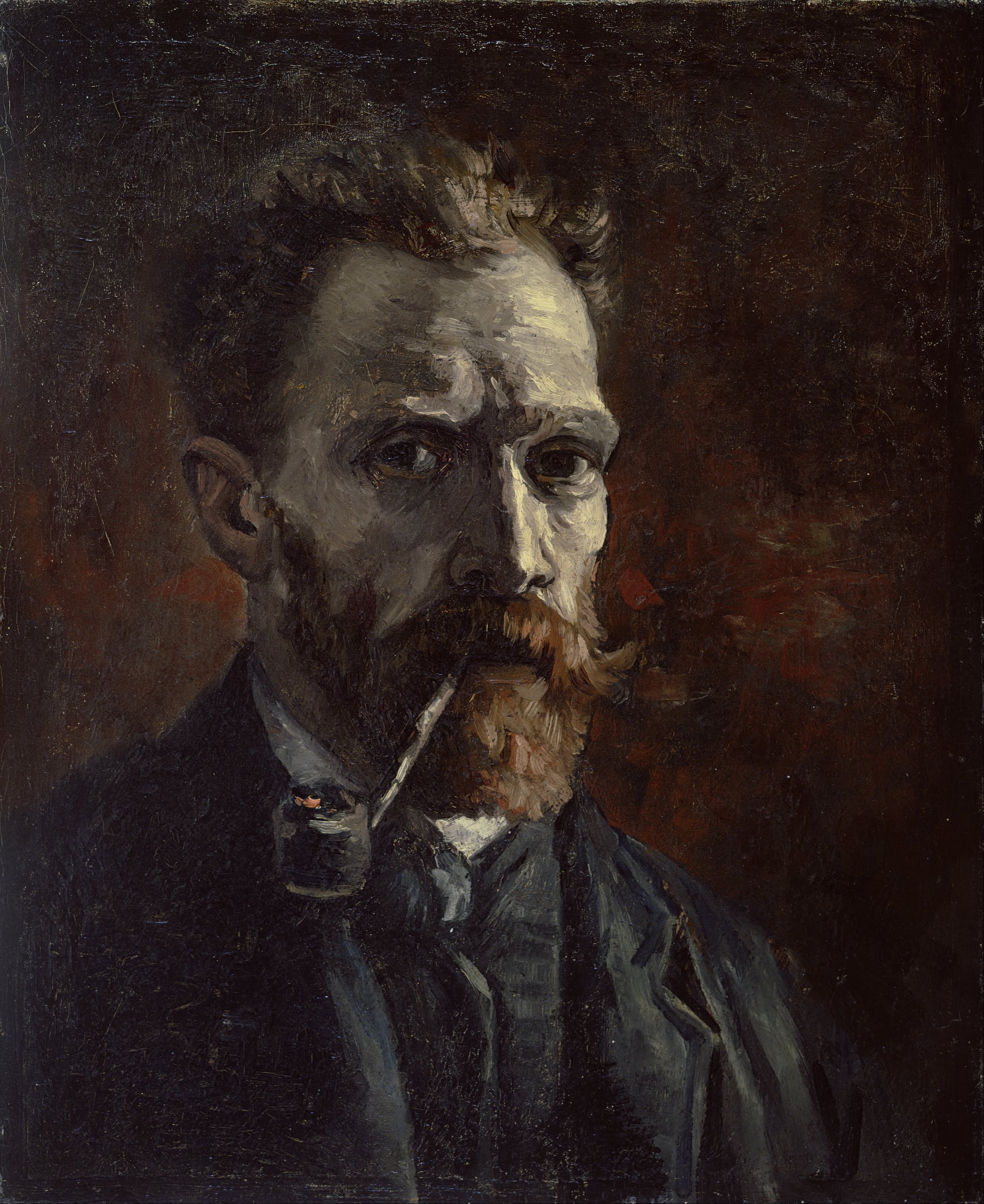
- Self-Portrait with Pipe (1886) by Vincent van Gogh, the title character
- Librettist: Rautavaara
- Language: Finnish
- Premiere: 17 May 1990; Helsinki Opera House

Vincent is an opera in three acts by Einojuhani Rautavaara first performed in 1990. The libretto is by the composer, and consists of scenes from the life of the artist Vincent van Gogh, told in retrospect.

== Composition ==
Vincent, the composer's fourth full-length opera, was first performed at the Helsinki Opera House on 17 May 1990. The idea of the piece emerged when Jorma Hynninen, showing a photo of himself to Rautavaara, asked the composer who he looked like. The answer was Van Gogh; Hynninen created the title role, and recorded it the same year. German performances took place in Kiel and Hagen in the following year. Told in flashback, the opera revolves around Vincent's relationships with the prostitute Maria, his fellow painter Paul Gauguin and his brother Theo. The orchestral preludes are named after three of Van Gogh's paintings. The score covers both serialism and tonal writing, with colourful orchestration. Rautavaara used some material from the opera in his Symphony No 6 Vincentiana (1992).

== Roles ==
Role	Voice type	Premiere Cast, 17 May 1990, (Conductor: Fuat Mansurov)
Vincent	baritone	Jorma Hynninen
Theo	tenor	Matti Heinikari
Paul Gauguin	bass	Marko Putkonen
Maria Hoornik	mezzo-soprano	Eeva-Liisa Saarinen
Gaby	soprano	Sini Rautavaara
Rachel	mezzo-soprano	
Magdalena	alto	
Secretary, Clerk, Artist	mezzo-soprano	
Chaplain, Chief Preacher, Aesthete	tenor	
Chief Warder, Chief of Police, Critic	baritone	
Doctor Rey, Foreman, Professor	bass	

== Synopsis ==
After an orchestral prelude (Starry Night), the first act opens in the mental hospital of Saint-Rémy, amidst the sounds of the other inmates, along with Doctor Rey, his secretary, the hospital priest and chief guard. Vincent hears voices and his mind is cast back to his childhood. When called to supper Vincent offers twelve other patients his flesh and blood, but they flee, terrified. Vincent recalls his art and his friendship with his brother Theo. Next Vincent has visions of a mining accident in the village of Borinage, followed by other incidents from his childhood, and then Maria Hoornik. After recalling a meeting where Vincent, as a lay preacher, gives a political and religious sermon, and its aftermath, he promises sun and light for those in darkness. The act closes with an extended duet for Theo and Gaby reflecting on spirit and inspiration.

The second act is prefaced by another orchestral section (Wheatfield with Crows), and the scene changes to an art exhibition where a professor, an artist, an aesthete and a critic discuss the works. After an argument between Paul and Maria, she tells Vincent to look in the mirror to see lies in his reflection. Vincent smashes the mirror; Maria goes, and the critics turn on Vincent. After they have gone, against Theo's advice Paul incites Vincent to experience visions, but stops before these go too far. But the room changes into a bordello, with the women as the professionals of the house and the critics providing entertainment. When they all go upstairs, Vincent is prey to feelings of solitude. He paints a door on the wall, and through it, Gaby enters. They begin to dance and others return, and as the waltz becomes more ecstatic Vincent cuts off his ear, as an offering to the sun. The others reject him and a flock of blackbirds circles around him, blocking out the light.

Act 3 (Epilogue) opens with an orchestral prelude (The Church at Auvers). Back in the hospital in Saint-Remy Vincent shows his latest painting to Doctor Rey, but the doctor declines, afraid of the ridicule the possession of such a piece would bring. The guard and secretary also refuse but the priest takes it, hoping to sell it to get money for good works. His last monologue moves from disillusion to love for the visions of life, and slowly other voices join in; he finishes praising the sun, summer and life.

== See also ==
A Turkish language opera of 1956 by Nevit Kodallı, Van Gogh
