= Autumn Gardens =

Orchestral work by Einojuhani Rautavaara

- by Einojuhani Rautavaara
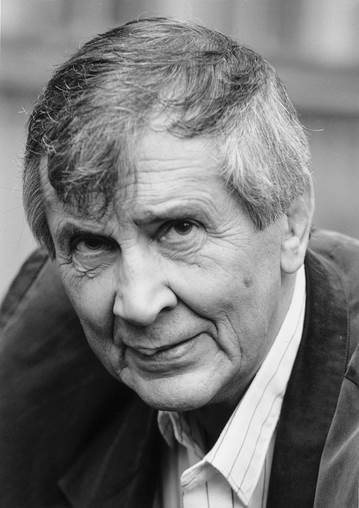
- Rautavaara, c. 2000
- Composed: 1999
- Movements: 3

Autumn Gardens is an orchestral work by Finnish composer Einojuhani Rautavaara. Written in 1999, it is one of Rautavaara's most performed works.

In the performance notes, Rautavaara writes, "I have often compared composing to gardening. In both processes, one observes and controls organic growth rather than constructing or assembling existing components and elements. I would also like to think that my compositions are rather like ‘English gardens’, freely growing and organic, as opposed to those that are pruned to geometric precision and severity."

The piece is in three movements:

1. Poetico
2. Tranquillo
3. Giocoso leggiero

== Instrumentation ==
The pieces is scored for the following instrumentation.

Woodwinds

2 flutes
2 oboes
2 clarinets
2 bassoons

Brass

2 French horns
tuba

Percussion

timpani
vibraphone

Strings

16 violins
8 violas
8 cellos
4 basses

== See also ==
- Cantus Arcticus
