= Piano Concerto No. 1 (Rautavaara) =

1969 musical work

- by Einojuhani Rautavaara
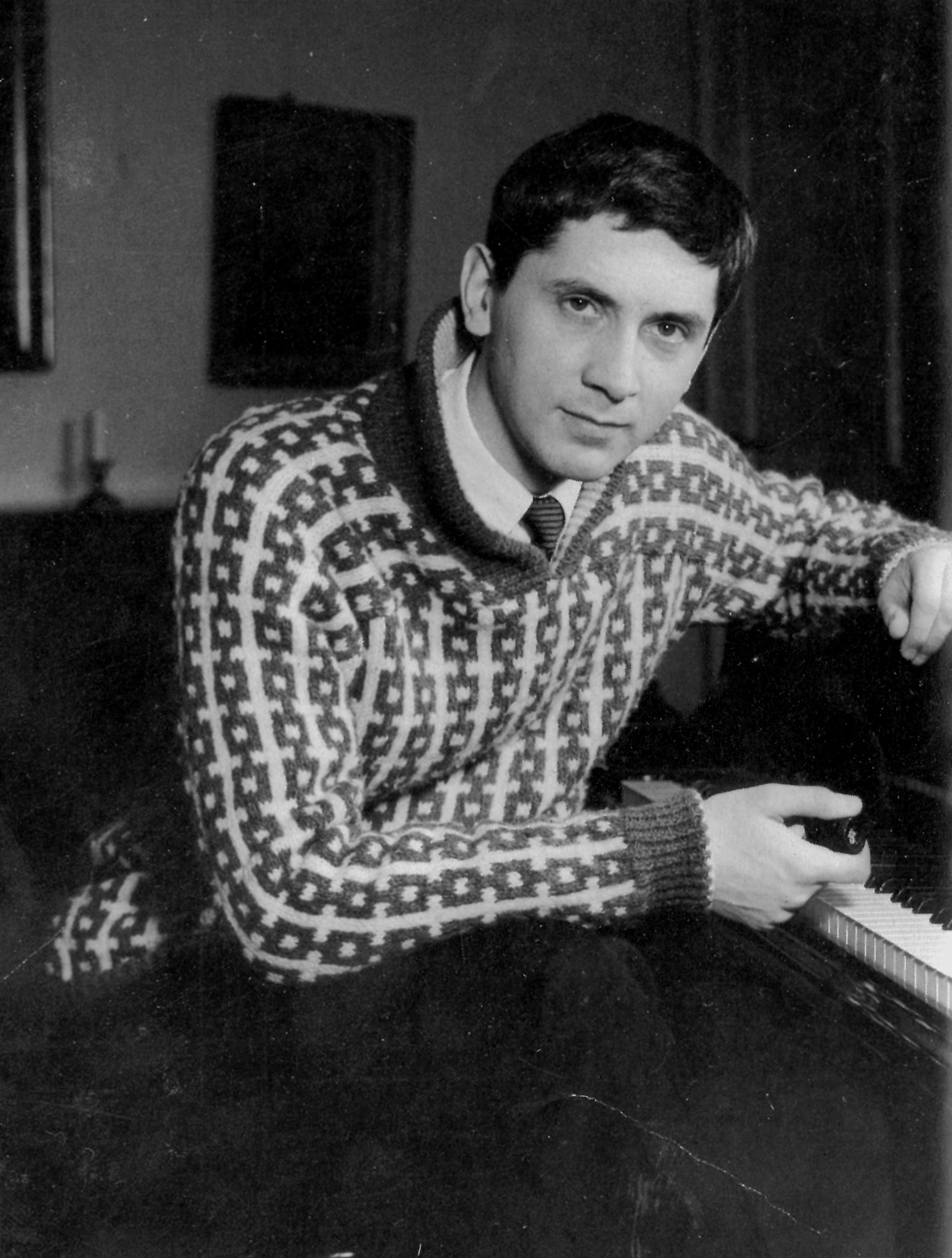
- Photo of Einojuhani Rautavaara in the 1950s
- Opus: 45
- Composed: 1969
- Movements: 3
- Scoring: Piano concerto

Einojuhani Rautavaara wrote his Piano Concerto No. 1, Op. 45, in 1969.

The piece contains many innovative uses of polytonality, cluster chords and extended uses of form. It was during this time that Rautavaara had become disenchanted with the serialist and twelve-tone techniques of his previous works, and abandoned them in favor of a more idiosyncratic, romantic, and avant-garde style.

== Movements ==
The concerto is in three movements.

=== I. Con grandezza ===
The first movement, Con grandezza, begins with a piano solo. For the first thirteen bars, there are octave clusters in the right hand, outlining a melody in D dorian, and harmonizing with a D major/minor arpeggio in the left hand. The orchestra joins abruptly after, imitating the piano intro. The piano and orchestra bounce themes off of each other, before a large climax, where the pianist is instructed to slam their arm on the keyboard to simulate a 3-octave wide cluster chord.

=== II. Andante ===
The second movement starts with a C drone in the strings, and ends with more tone clusters that lead into the beginning of the next movement.

=== III. Molto vivace ===
The third movement provides a strong climax with themes from the first movement with prominent brass parts.

== Instrumentation ==
Woodwinds
2 Flutes (second doubling piccolo)
2 Clarinets
Brass
4 Horns
2 Trumpets
2 Trombones
Percussion
Timpani
Unpitched percussion (triangle, snare drum, tam-tam, cymbal, woodblocks)
Piano
Strings
16 Violins
8 Violas
8 Cellos
4 Basses

== See also ==
- Piano Concerto No. 2 (Rautavaara)
- Piano Concerto No. 3 (Rautavaara)
