= A Requiem in Our Time =

1953 composition by Einojuhani Rautavaara

- Composition for brass ensemble by Einojuhani Rautavaara
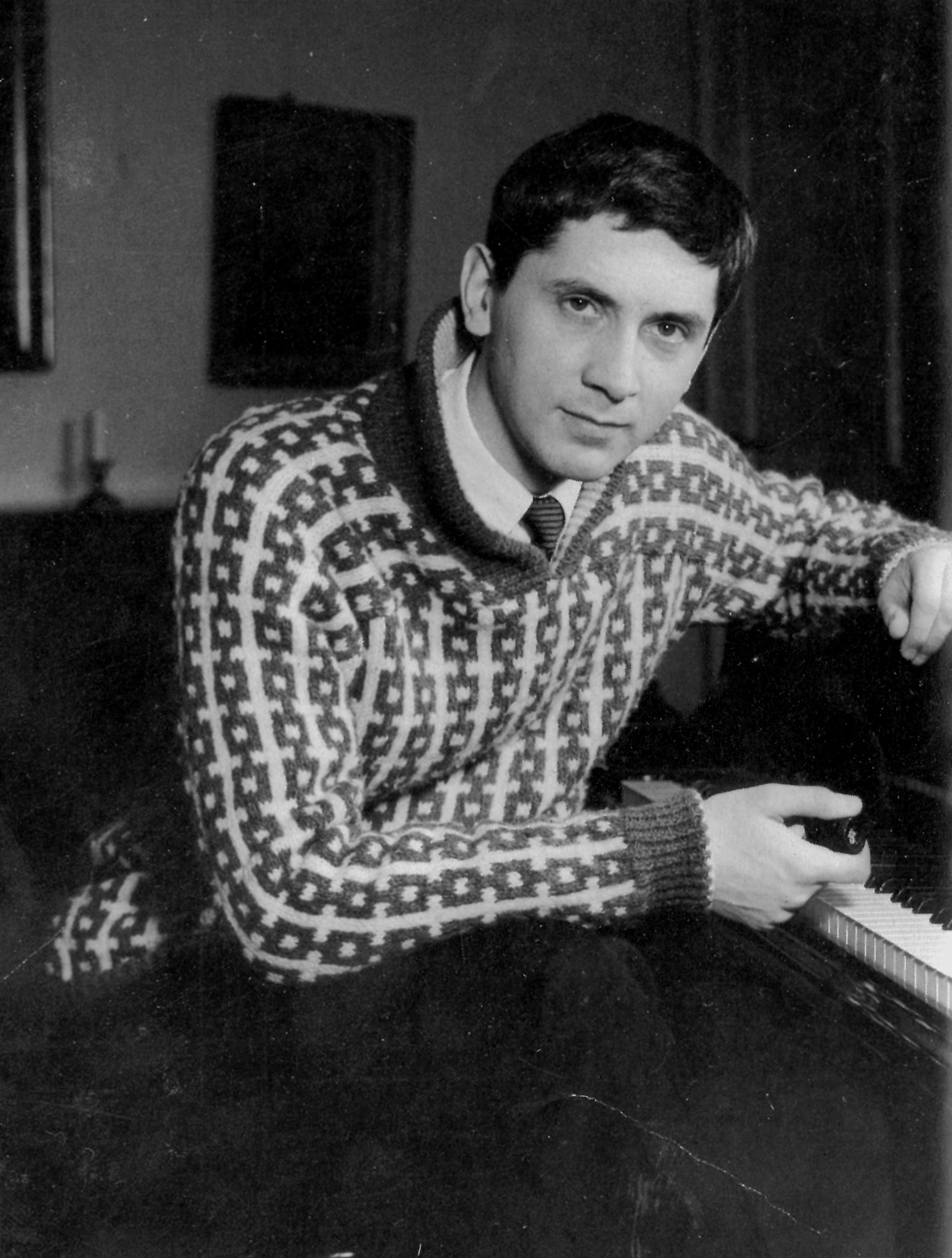
- The composer in the 1950s
- Opus: 3
- Year: 1953
- Dedication: "to the memory of my mother"
- Movements: 4
- Scoring: brass ensemble; percussion

A Requiem in Our Time, Op. 3, is a composition for brass ensemble and percussion by Einojuhani Rautavaara, written in 1953. It won him international attention while still a student.

== History ==
Rautavaara composed the work in 1953, and it premiered on May 10th 1954, with the Cincinnati Brass Choir conducted by Ernest N. Glover, after his studies at the Sibelius Academy in Helsinki from 1948 to 1952 with Aarre Merikanto. His style during that period was neoclassical, with close ties to tradition.

The composition brought him international attention: it won him the Thor Johnson Brass Composition competition of 1954, and it prompted Jean Sibelius in 1955 to recommend him for a scholarship at the Juilliard School in New York City.

== Music ==
Rautavaara structured the work in four movements:

1. Hymnus – Festivamente
2. Credo et dubito – Vivace – Grave
3. Dies Irae – Allegro
4. Lacrymosa – Larghetto tranquillo

Two of the four Latin titles correspond to movements of the Requiem mass, to parts of the sequence Dies irae (Day of Wrath), its verses "Dies irae" and "Lacrymosa dies illa" (Tearful will be that day). Rautavaara scored the work for 13 brass parts (4 trumpets in B♭, 4 horns in F, 3 trombones, tenor tuba/euphonium and bass tuba), timpani and percussion (bell, cymbals, glockenspiel, snare drum and xylophone), and wrote the dedication "to the memory of my mother".

The first movement opens with a trombone fanfare accompanied by trumpets. The meter changes often. The second movement, Credo et dubito (Belief and doubt), begins with muted trumpet and muted horn, which play with a staccato motif of sixteenth. At times horns and low brass interrupt by playing a grave chorale. The third movement is sharply articulated. The last movement is the only slow movement with gentle music associated with Requiem (Rest). The conductor Osmo Vänskä says: "It's a piece I've conducted many times. It has this kind of drama, but it's always speaking to the audience.". A reviewer of the Australian premiere on 8 April 2011 at Sydney's Opera House noted that the work combines "conciseness and economy of utterance with an opulent and romantic sense of expression".

== Recordings ==
A Requiem in Our Time is the title of a 2000 recording of Rautavaara's complete works for brass, performed by the Finnish Brass Symphony conducted by Hannu Lintu. A Requiem in Our Time is part of a 2003 recording of Rautavaara's works, performed by members of the Helsinki Philharmonic orchestra conducted by Jorma Panula. A reviewer noted that "virtuoso playing is required to achieve speed and pianissimo layering".
