= Laura Mikkola =

Finnish pianist

Laura Imola Mikkola (born 3 February 1974 in Helsinki) is a Finnish pianist.

Laura Mikkola, having previously won Pretoria's UNISA TRANSNET and Helsinki's Maj Lind competitions, and been awarded the XII Paloma O'Shea Competition's contemporary music prize and a grant prize, was second to Markus Groh at the XIII Queen Elisabeth Music Competition. She has performed internationally since the mid-90s.

There are a lot of CD recordings from different labels available (Naxos, ECM, BIS, René Gally, AEON, Cascavelle, and Outhere). She is well known for her recordings of Einojuhani Rautavaara's Piano Concertos and piano works for Naxos Records.

In 2020, she recorded the works of Svein Hundsnes and Légendes, the first monographic CD of the French composer David Chaillou for the label Fuga Libera. Légendes received five stars from the RBB-Kultur (Berlin). She is also a leading interpreter of the piano works by the Finnish composer Einojuhani Rautavaara.
