= Incantations (composition) =

Concerto by Einojuhani Rautavaara

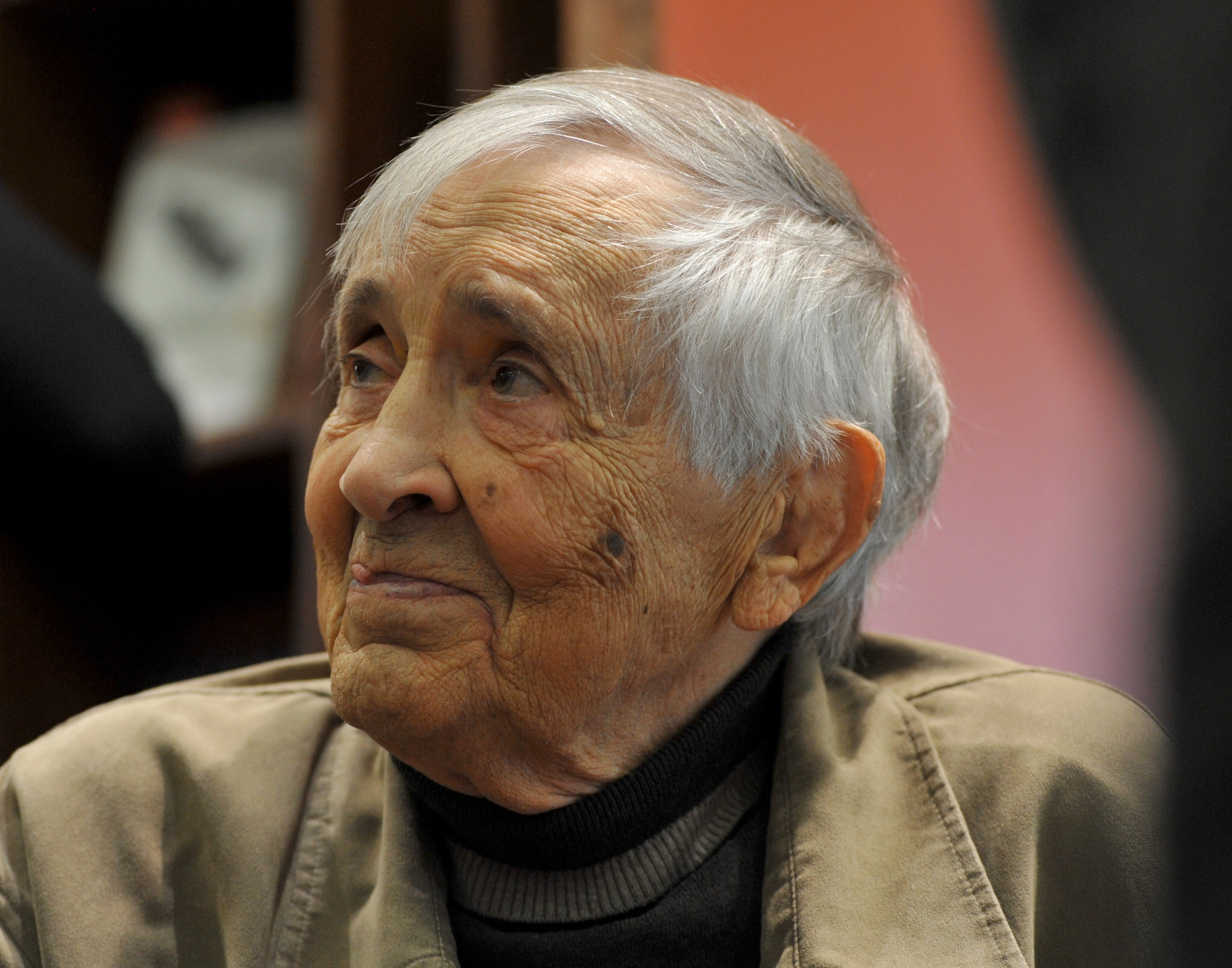
Einojuhani Rautavaara in 2014

Incantations for Percussion and Orchestra is a concerto for percussion and orchestra in three movements by the Finnish composer Einojuhani Rautavaara. The work was composed for the percussionist Colin Currie on a joint commission from the London Philharmonic Orchestra, the Baltimore Symphony Orchestra, the Rotterdam Philharmonic Orchestra, and the Tampere Philharmonic Orchestra. The first performance was given in Royal Festival Hall, London by Currie and the London Philharmonic Orchestra under the conductor Yannick Nézet-Séguin on October 24, 2009.

== Composition ==
=== Structure ===
The concerto has a duration of roughly 23 minutes and is composed in three movements:

1. Pesante
2. Espressivo
3. Animato

=== Style and inspiration ===
Rautavaara described the origins of the piece in the score program note, writing:

When I heard recorded performances by Colin Currie, I was impressed by the virtuosity and musicality in handling the various kinds of percussion instruments. When asked, I was willing to compose a concerto for him to play, and when he visited Helsinki in the late 2007 I could already show him sketches for the work.

Currie later recalled that when he arrived in Helsinki the composer had already finished two-thirds of the score. After hearing Currie's input, however, Rautavaara left room for a cadenza in the third movement to be improvised by Currie.

=== Instrumentation ===
Incantations is scored for a solo percussionist and orchestra, comprising two flutes, two oboes, two clarinets, two bassoons, two French horns, three trumpets, two trombones, timpani, tubular bells, and strings.

== Reception ==
Guy Rickards of Gramophone described the work's form as "an orthodox but compelling vehicle for Currie's blistering virtuosity" and praised the music for its "powerfully elemental undertow." Rosie Pentreath of BBC Music Magazine similarly lauded, "It's one of Rautavaara's most immediate and colourful concertos, framed by a majestic statement of purpose. Its finale is a dizzying dance, whose improvised cadenza seems to point to the soloist as much as the composer as the shaman of the piece." Martin Kettle of The Guardian reflected that the piece "manages to be both intensely innovative and highly conventional" and wrote:

Rautavaara's concerto is dominated by a resplendent opening orchestral fanfare, which returns at the work's close. The solo part is not, as one had feared, a massive crash-bang-wallop drum extravaganza, but a delicate and luminous invention of great expressiveness, with the marimba and vibraphone carrying much of the solo writing. Colin Currie's athletic playing was as dazzling and persuasive as the work itself.

Tom Huizenga of NPR called the work "compelling" and remarked:

The three-movement concerto is laid out in the tried and true fast-slow-fast formula, which plays into Currie's virtuosity in the outer movements. Rautavaara's opening gambit, a complex marimba line that stretches out as if to the horizon, eventually gives way to raucous passages for drums and cymbals. The heart of the work is the central "Espressivo," a calm oasis for vibraphone only where repeated chords get refracted over again in various keys.

He continued:

The final movement [...], with its shifting pulsations, hints at Rautavaara's mystical side. In his notes to the piece, he says it "could be a shaman's dance in a jerky rhythm." And that shaman might as well be Currie armed with his mallets, his battery of instruments and his staggering technique.
