= Mikko Franck =

Finnish conductor and violinist

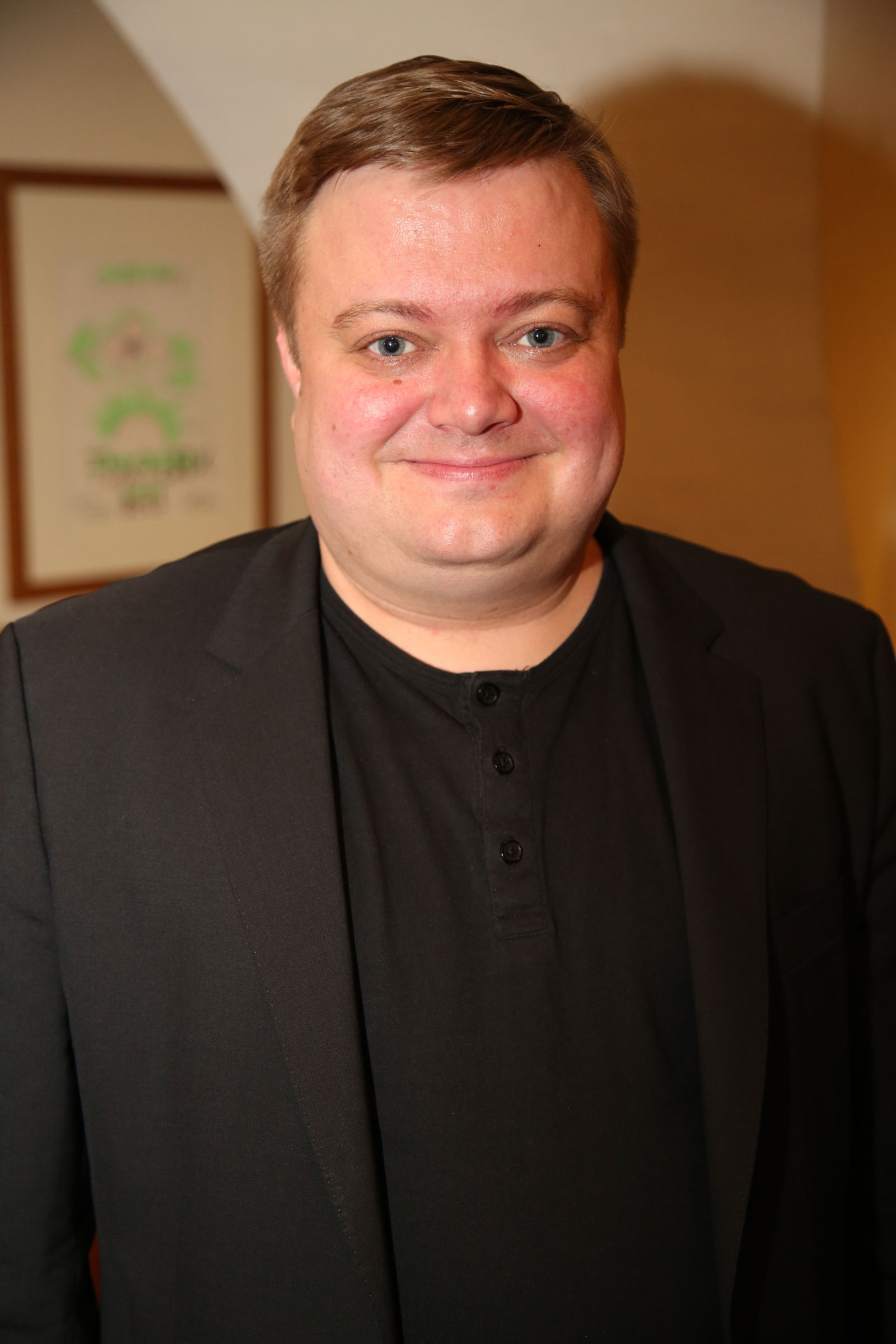
- Franck in 2015
- Born: 1 April 1979 (age 47); Helsinki
- Occupations: Conductor; Violinist
- Spouse: Martina Picket (m. 2006; div. 2010)

Mikko Ilmari Franck (born 1 April 1979) is a Finnish conductor and violinist.

== Biography ==
Franck was born in Helsinki. He began learning the violin at the age of 5 and started violin studies at the Sibelius Academy in 1992. The Academy let Franck conduct an orchestra in 1995, whereupon Jorma Panula enlisted him as a private student. Franck entered Panula's conducting class at the academy in 1996, leaving in 1998 as his international career began. He said Panula "gave me everything that can be taught about this profession."

Before age 23, Franck had made his conducting début with all leading Scandinavian orchestras, with the London Philharmonia, London Symphony Orchestra, Munich Philharmonic, Berlin State Opera Orchestra and the Israel Philharmonic.

His first recording, of Jean Sibelius, received a Grammy nomination for "Best Orchestral Performance". He champions Einojuhani Rautavaara's works.

Franck was the Belgian National Orchestra's artistic director from 2002 to 2007. He became the Finnish National Opera's general music director in August 2006. Six months later, he claimed a loss of confidence in the company's then-general director Erkki Korhonen and administrative director Pekka Kauranen, and announced his resignation. In response, the company nominated Franck to the dual post of artistic director and general music director. His term in both posts finished in 2013.

Franck became music director of the Orchestre Philharmonique de Radio France in September 2015. He resigned as the orchestra's music director at the close of the 2024–2025 season.

Unusually for conductors, Franck generally conducts while seated in a chair due to a painful spine condition.

Franck and opera director Martina Pickert married in 2006. The couple divorced in 2010.

== Selected discography ==
- Jean Sibelius – Lemminkäinen Suite / En saga; Swedish Radio Symphony Orchestra (Ondine 953; 2000)
- Pyotr Ilyich Tchaikovsky – Symphony No. 6 / Einojuhani Rautavaara – Apotheosis; Swedish Radio Symphony Orchestra (Ondine 1002; 2003)
- Einojuhani Rautavaara – The House of the Sun: Oulu Symphony Orchestra; Jukka Romu, Raija Regnell, Ulla Raiskio, Tuomas Katajala, Petri Backstrom, Tommi Hakala, Markus Nieminen, Helena Juntunen, Mia Huhta, Anne-Kristiina Kaappola, singers (Ondine 1032; 2004)
- Einojuhani Rautavaara – Rasputin: Finnish National Opera Orchestra and Finnish National Opera Chorus; Lilli Paasikivi, Jorma Hynninen, Jyrki Anttila, Riikka Rantanen, Ritva-Liisa Korhonen, Jyrki Korhonen, Gabriel Suovanen, Matti Salminen, Lassi Virtanen, singers (Ondine 1002; 2005)
- Einojuhani Rautavaara – Symphony No. 1, Adagio Celeste, Book of Visions; Belgian National Orchestra (Ondine 1064; 2006)

Cultural offices
Preceded by Muhai Tang	Music Director, Finnish National Opera; 2006–2013	Succeeded by Michael Güttler (principal conductor)
Preceded by Myung-whun Chung	Music Director, Orchestre Philharmonique de Radio France; 2015–present	Succeeded by incumbent
