= Kalevi Aho =

Finnish composer

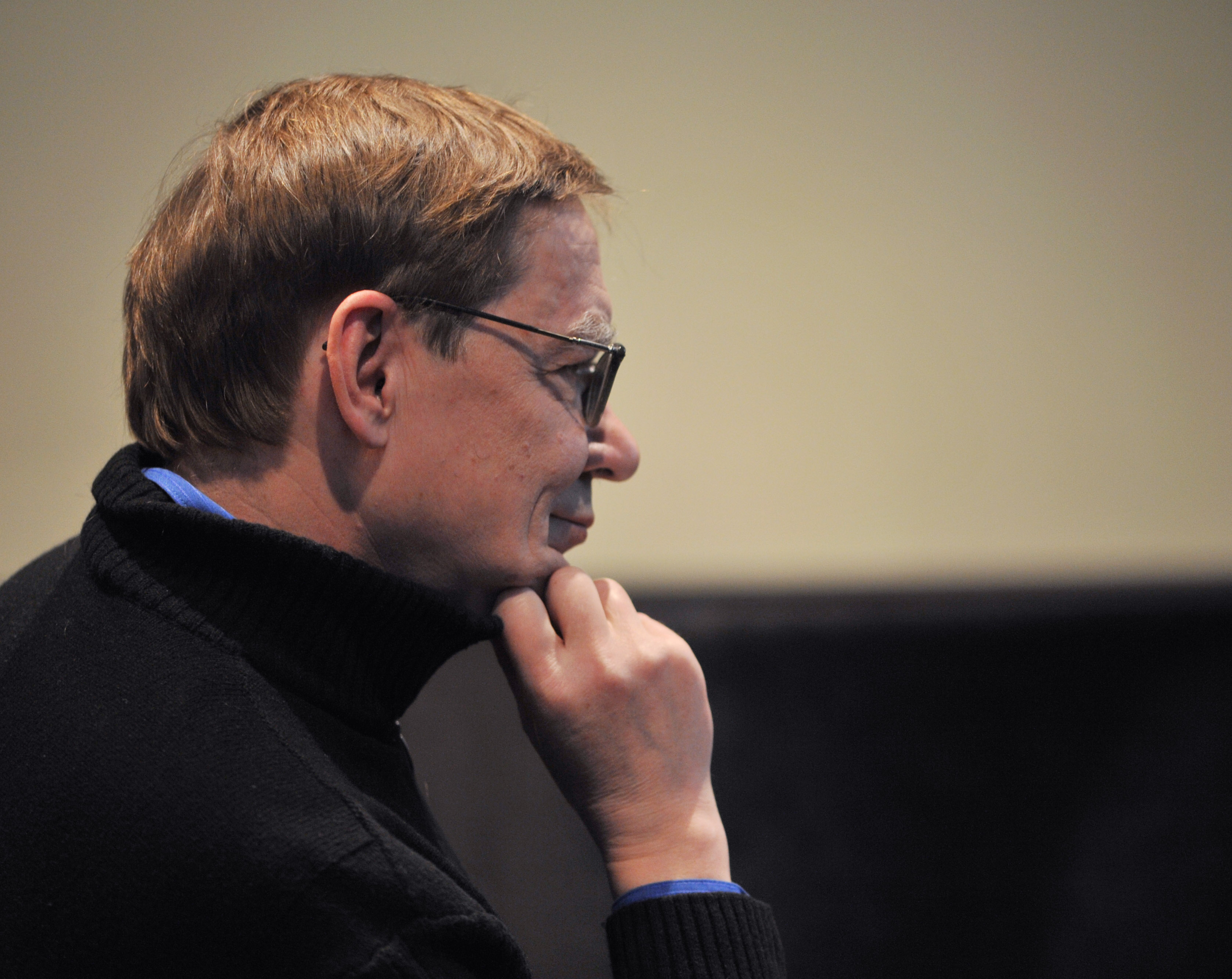
- Aho in 2010
- Born: 9 March 1949 (age 77); Forssa, Finland
- Occupations: Composer; Academic teacher

Kalevi Ensio Aho (born 9 March 1949) is a Finnish composer.

== Early years ==
Aho began his interest in music at the age of ten, when he discovered a mandolin in his home and began to teach himself how to play it. He soon was taken under the tutelage of Martti Loikkanen, the boy's 4th grade teacher and founder of a local youth mandolin ensemble in Forssa. After learning how to read sheet music, Aho immediately started composing. Aho's parents were quite supportive of his musical hobby, encouraging him to compose and giving him a piano at the age of 15.

== Career ==
He moved from the city of Forssa to Helsinki in September 1968 to study at the Sibelius Academy. He studied composition at the Sibelius Academy under Einojuhani Rautavaara, beginning that year and receiving a diploma in 1971. He continued his studies for a year in Berlin with Boris Blacher. His teaching positions include music theory at the University of Helsinki from 1974 to 1988, and a professorship at the Sibelius Academy from 1988 to 1993. He was named composer-in-residence for the Lahti Symphony Orchestra in 1992, and conductor Osmo Vänskä has recorded many of his recent large-scale works with the orchestra. Aho has worked as a freelance composer, with a state scholarship, since 1993. He lives in Helsinki.

He is foreign member of the Royal Swedish Academy of Music.

== Music ==
Known principally as a composer of large-scale works, as of 2024 Aho has composed eighteen symphonies, forty-five concertos, five operas and several vocal works. His chamber music includes several quintets, quartets, sonatas and solo works. He first came to fame with his first symphony (1969) and second string quartet (1970).

His works of this time showed such neo-classical traits as a preoccupation with counterpoint (particularly fugues), and stylized renderings of older forms, such as the waltz. In the following decade he wrote in modernist and post-modernist styles. His use of irony and juxtaposition of contrasting moods and musical styles and genres has been compared to Gustav Mahler and Alfred Schnittke.

== Literature ==
- Korhonen, Kimmo (1999). Kalevi Aho in Profile. Finnish Music Information Centre. Retrieved 8 February 2005.
- Oramo, Ilkka. "Aho, Kalevi." at Grove Music Online.. Retrieved 21 September 2006.
