= Ondine (record label) =

Finnish record label

- Parent company: Naxos Records
- Founded: 1985
- Founder: Reijo Kiilunen
- Genre: Classical
- Country of origin: Finland
- Location: Helsinki
- Official website: www.ondine.net

Ondine is a Finnish classical record label founded in 1985 in Helsinki, Finland. Its catalogue with several award-winning releases includes over 600 titles with major Finnish and international artists.

Ondine's roster of artists and ensembles include conductor and pianist Christoph Eschenbach, conductors Hannu Lintu, Robert Trevino, Vladimir Ashkenazy, Olari Elts, Jaime Martín, Esa-Pekka Salonen, Jukka-Pekka Saraste, Sakari Oramo, Leif Segerstam, John Storgårds and Mikko Franck, orchestras such as The Philadelphia Orchestra, the Orchestre de Paris, the Finnish Radio Symphony Orchestra, Malmö Symphony Orchestra, Royal Northern Sinfonia, the London Sinfonietta, the BBC Symphony Orchestra, the Los Angeles Philharmonic, the Czech Philharmonic, Estonian National Symphony Orchestra, Tallinn Chamber Orchestra, Lapland Chamber Orchestra, Latvian National Symphony Orchestra, Lithuanian National Symphony Orchestra and the Helsinki Philharmonic, Tetzlaff String Quartet, Latvian Radio Choir, Estonian Philharmonic Chamber Choir, pianists Lars Vogt, Olli Mustonen, violinists Christian Tetzlaff, Pekka Kuusisto, cellist Truls Mørk, clarinetist Kari Kriikku and singers Gerald Finley, Soile Isokoski and Dmitry Hvorostovsky.

In recent years the label has received several awards, including Grammy awards and nominations as well as Gramophone Awards, BBC Music Magazine Awards, and ICMA Awards. The label has maintained a long and fruitful association with the Finnish composers Einojuhani Rautavaara, Kaija Saariaho and Magnus Lindberg, having recorded the premieres of many of their works and garnering many awards along the way. The recording of Einojuhani Rautavaara's 7th Symphony (Angel of Light), was released in 1996 to a huge commercial success gaining a Grammy nomination. Ondine has also released premiere recordings of several works by living Baltic composers, including Pēteris Vasks and Erkki-Sven Tüür.

== History ==
The roots of Ondine date back to 1985 when founder Reijo Kiilunen released the very first Ondine album under the auspices of the renowned Finnish Kuhmo Chamber Music Festival. The label's initial mission was to produce one live album at the Festival each season. The fourth album, however, featured Einojuhani Rautavaara's opera Thomas, raising major international attention and opening up the possibility for North American distribution. Kiilunen, who was running the Festival's concert agency and had begun the recording activity part-time, soon decided to devote himself fully to the development of this new business, producing and editing the first 50 releases himself. In 1991, Seppo Siirala joined as producer, and the Helsinki-based company has been expanding steadily since. Today, Ondine continues to uphold its reputation as one of the most respected labels in classical music. Naxos acquired Ondine in 2008 and became the company's global distributor.

== See also ==
- List of record labels
