= Einojuhani Rautavaara =

Finnish composer (1928–2016)

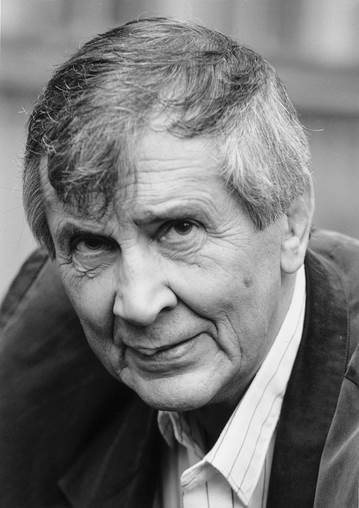
- Rautavaara, c. 2000
- Born: 9 October 1928; Helsinki, Finland
- Died: 27 July 2016 (aged 87); Helsinki, Finland
- Notable work: Piano Concerto No. 1 Cantus Arcticus; Symphony No. 7 (Angel of Light); List of compositions
- Spouses: Mariaheidi Suovanen (m. 1959; div. 1984) Sinikka Koivisto (m. 1984)
- Children: 3 (including Markojuhani)

Einojuhani Rautavaara (Finnish pronunciation: [ˈei̯noˌjuhɑni ˈrɑu̯tɑˌʋɑːrɑ]; 9 October 1928 – 27 July 2016) was a Finnish composer of classical music. Among the most notable Finnish composers since Jean Sibelius (1865–1957), Rautavaara wrote a great number of works spanning various styles. These include eight symphonies, nine operas and fifteen concertante works, as well as numerous vocal and chamber works. Having written early works using 12-tone serial techniques, his later music may be described as neo-romantic and mystical. His major works include his first piano concerto (1969), Cantus Arcticus (1972) and his seventh symphony, Angel of Light (1994).

== Life ==
Rautavaara was born in Helsinki in 1928. His father Eino Alfred Rautavaara (né Jernberg; 1876–1939; he Finnicized his last name in 1901) was an opera singer and cantor, and his mother Elsa Katariina Rautavaara (née Teräskeli; originally Träskelin) (1898–1944) was a doctor. His early childhood was molded by the musicianship of his father, and at the encouragement of his mother, Einojuhani began to casually learn piano when he was young. His father died when Einojuhani was ten years old, with his mother dying less than six years later. He went to live with his aunt Hilja Helena Teräskeli (1893–1958) in the city of Turku, where he began taking formal piano lessons at the age of 17.

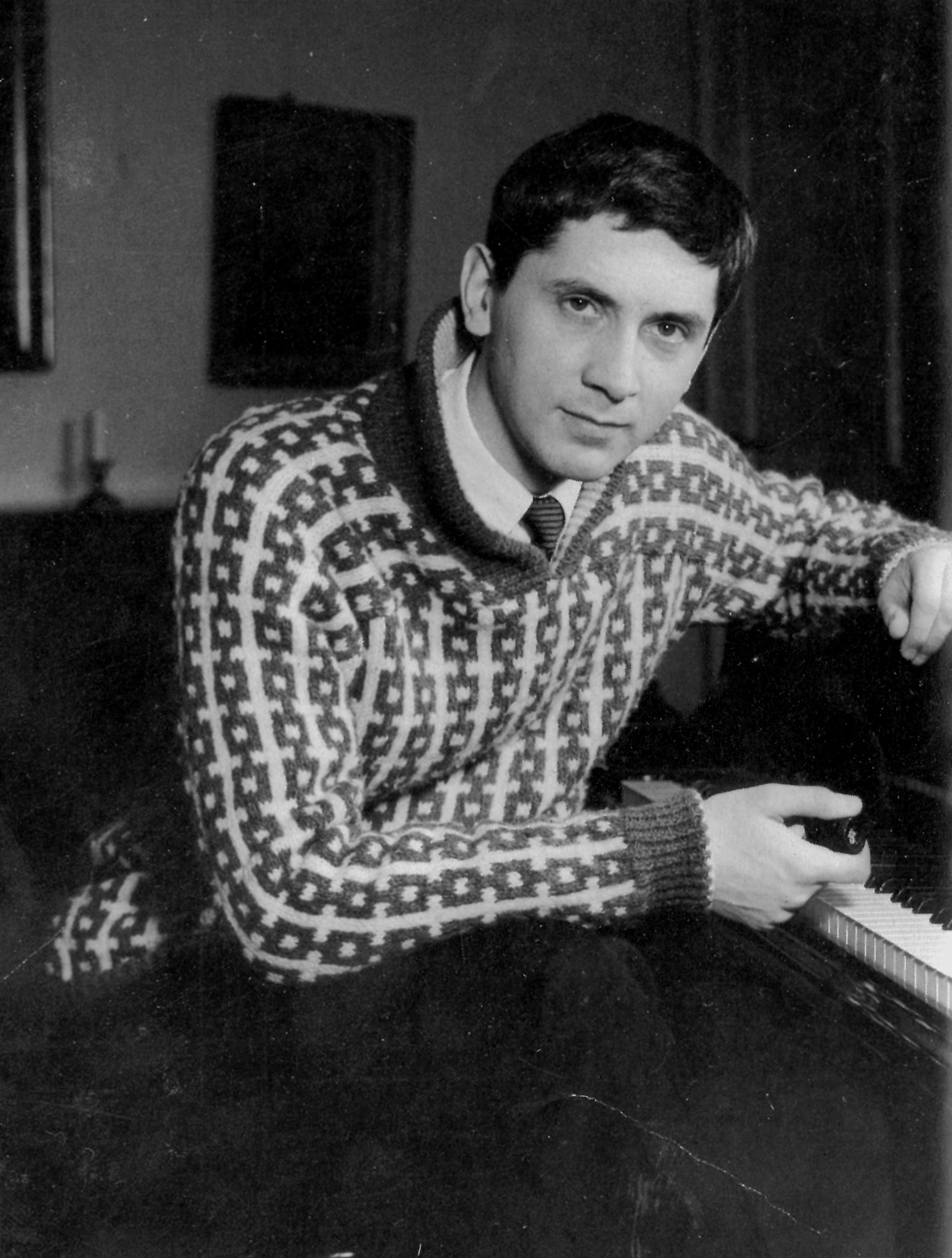
Rautavaara in the 1950s

Rautavaara attended the University of Helsinki to study piano and musicology, and eventually studied composition at the Sibelius Academy under Aarre Merikanto from 1948 to 1952. He first came to international attention when he won the Thor Johnson Contest for his composition A Requiem in Our Time in 1954, despite having, according to Rautavaara, "...absolutely no experience of writing for brass band and [a] composition technique [that] was immature at the time..." The work caught the attention of then-famous Finnish composer Jean Sibelius, prompting him to recommend Rautavaara for a scholarship to study at the Juilliard School in New York City. There he was taught by Vincent Persichetti, and he also took lessons from Roger Sessions and Aaron Copland at Tanglewood. Reflecting on his time enrolled in Juilliard, Rautavaara later said that living in Manhattan was, "Maybe the most important experience, [and] taught much more about life to me than all those teachers about music." He then returned to Helsinki and graduated from the Sibelius Academy in 1957, later choosing to study further in Switzerland that same year, under the tutelage of Swiss composer Wladimir Vogel. The following year, he traveled to Cologne, Germany to study under German composer Rudolf Petzold.

Rautavaara served as a non-tenured teacher at the Sibelius Academy from 1957 to 1959, music archivist of the Helsinki Philharmonic Orchestra from 1959 to 1961, rector of the Käpylä Music Institute in Helsinki from 1965 to 1966, tenured teacher at the Sibelius Academy from 1966 to 1976, artist professor (appointed by the Arts Council of Finland) from 1971 to 1976, and professor of composition at the Sibelius Academy from 1976 to 1990. Some of his more famous pupils during this era were Finnish composer Kalevi Aho and conductor Esa-Pekka Salonen.

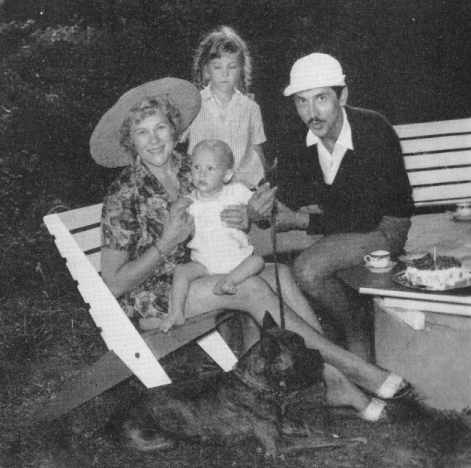
Rautavaara with his wife, Mariaheidi, and their two children in 1961

He married Heidi Maria "Mariaheidi" Suovanen, an actress, in 1959. Together they had two sons, Markojuhani and Olof, and a daughter, Yrja. The couple separated in 1982 and divorced in 1984, after he fell in love with Sinikka Koivisto, who was 29 years his junior. In 1984 he married Sinikka.

Rautavaara was awarded the Finnish State Prize for Music in 1985.

After an aortic dissection in January 2004, Rautavaara spent almost half a year in intensive care before recovering and continuing his work. The Finnish government gave him strong support during this time, and named him an arts professor, paying him only to compose. He died on 27 July 2016 in Helsinki from complications of hip surgery.

== Music ==
Rautavaara was a prolific composer and wrote in a variety of forms and styles. His oeuvre can be broadly divided into four periods: an early "neoclassical" period of the 1950s, exhibiting close ties to tradition; an avant-garde and constructivist stage of the 1960s, when he experimented with serial techniques, but abandoned them later in the decade; a "neo-romantic" period of the late 1960s and the 1970s; and an eclectic, "post-modern" compositional style in which he blended a wide spectrum of stylistic techniques and genres. A recurring label given to his opus is "mysticism", for his fascination with metaphysical and religious subjects and texts. (Several of his works have titles which allude to angels.) His compositions include eight symphonies, 15 concertos, choral works (several for unaccompanied choir, including Vigilia (1971–1972)), sonatas for various instruments, string quartets and other chamber music, and a number of biographical operas including Vincent (1986–1987, based on the life of Vincent van Gogh), Aleksis Kivi (1995–1996) and Rasputin (2001–2003).

=== Compositional process ===
In the performance notes of his 1999 piece Autumn Gardens, Rautavaara writes, "I have often compared composing to gardening. In both processes, one observes and controls organic growth rather than constructing or assembling existing components and elements. I would also like to think that my compositions are rather like 'English gardens', freely growing and organic, as opposed to those that are pruned to geometric precision and severity." He has also described that he would first pick the instrumentation of a piece, where the music could then "grow organically" as a concept.

=== 1960s ===
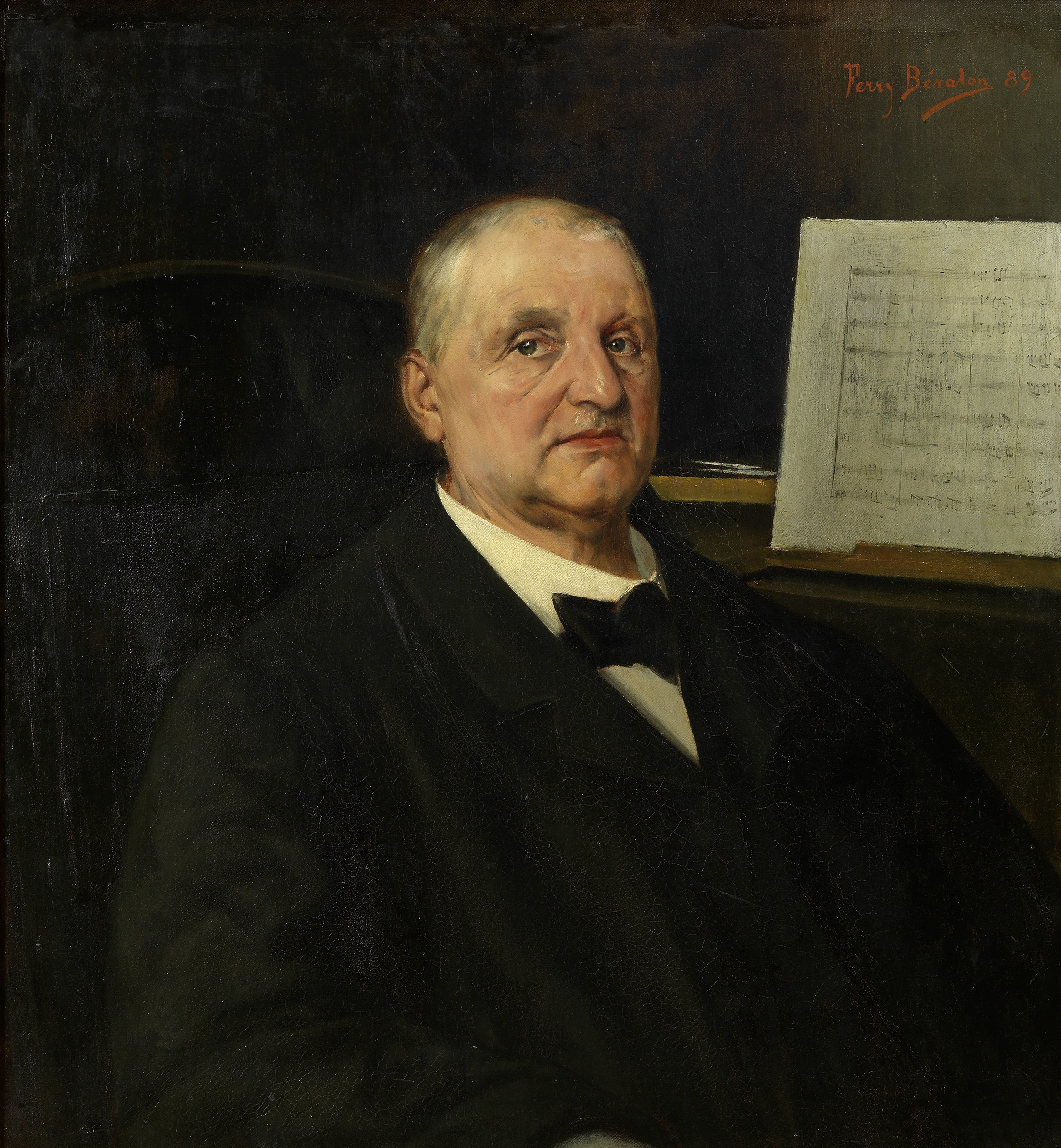
Austrian composer Anton Bruckner was a great inspiration to Rautavaara in the beginning of his career

Along with Erik Bergman, Rautavaara was one of the pioneers of serial composing in Finland in the early 1950s, although in the end he completed only a few serial works. His most important works from the period are the Third and Fourth Symphony, and the opera Kaivos (The Mine), which saw only a television production in 1963, but was a source of material for the string orchestra pieces Canto I (1960) and Canto II (1961), and for the Third String Quartet (1965). Even his serial works from the period carry obvious romantic and post-expressionist notes stylistically closer to Alban Berg and Anton Bruckner than more straightforward serialists such as Pierre Boulez. Rautavaara himself referred to the Third as the "Bruckner symphony".

His use of these 12-tone and serialist techniques was highly uncommon in Finland at the time, allowing Rautavaara to become a controversial figure, and pushing him to the forefront of the Finnish classical music scene, alongside composers Joonas Kokkonen and Erkki Salmenhaara. In the mid-1960s, however, Rautavaara fell into a creative crisis with serialism, realizing that the composition method was immensely laborious and its distance from the outcome too large. He later recalled that "...the modernism of that time, [...] that is the serialism in music, which I had experimented with, [...] was not a road for me to follow." He experimented and found a resolution towards the end of the decade, when he began to explore different styles as he had earlier done in the Third Symphony. The Bach-influenced Cello Concerto No.1 (1968) and Debussy-influenced Anadyomene (1968) opened his creative deadlock. More eclectic works started to emerge, whose style loans and compositional techniques over time became characteristic of his style. Its hallmarks included three-chord-based, often modal harmonies, ringing softly romantic orchestrals, modernism springing from the new play modes, and finally the return of the twelve-tone passages embedded into the musical texture.

=== 1970s ===
The 1970s were Rautavaara's most productive period. According to Rautavaara, it was during this period that he had discovered a "synthesis" and until that point he was merely a student, collecting information on various styles and techniques. In a short time he composed an extensive body of music, most of which has withstood the test of time. The softly-sounding new style was noticed by choirs, who commissioned a number of choral songs from the composer. His major choral works Vigilia and True and False Unicorn were made during 1971. Cantus Arcticus followed immediately after, in the beginning of 1972, and in the summer he composed an extensive score for male choir, A Book of Life.

In the 1970s Rautavaara started working more extensively on operas. The comical opera-musical Apollo contra Marsyas, made in 1970 in cooperation with librettist Bengt V. Wall turned out to be a disappointment. After that, based on motifs from the Kalevala, he composed The Myth of Sampo (1974–1983) and Marjatta, lowly maiden (1975). His mature style in operas was exhibited later, in Thomas (1985); subsequently Vincent (1987) and The House of the Sun (1991) earned him notable international success. His later operas include The Gift of the Magi (1994), Aleksis Kivi (1997) and Rasputin (2003).

A number of his works have parts for magnetic tape, including Cantus Arcticus (1972, also known as Concerto for Birds & Orchestra) for taped bird song and orchestra, and True and False Unicorn (1971, second version 1974, revised 2001–02), the final version of which is for three reciters, choir, orchestra and tape.

=== 1980s and 1990s ===
In the late 1970s, Rautavaara gradually turned toward stylistic synthesis, evident in the Organ Concerto "Annunciations" (1977) and the Violin Concerto (1977), and especially in Angels and Visitations (1978) for orchestra. It is the first in the "Angel" series, which also includes the Fifth Symphony, whose working title was "Monologue with Angels", the double-bass concerto Angel of Dusk from 1980, and the Seventh Symphony "Angel of Light".

His opera Thomas (1985) marked the beginning of his mature operatic style, combining neo-Romantic harmonies with aleatoric counterpoint, twelve-tone rows and different modal systems. The libretto, written by Rautavaara himself, tells the story of a 13th-century Bishop of Finland as experienced by the protagonist himself, again using Kalevala motifs. A similar first-person narrative is used in the next opera Vincent (1987) devoted to Vincent van Gogh. Along with The House of the Sun (1991), the operas earned him notable international success.

His most widely acclaimed work, the Seventh Symphony, earned a Cannes Classical Award and a Grammy nomination for the recording by the Helsinki Philharmonic Orchestra conducted by Leif Segerstam.

Apart from the Angel of Light, his notable instrumental works from the period include the Sixth Symphony "Vincentiana" (1992), based on Vincent; the Third Piano Concerto "Gift of Dreams" (1998), commissioned by Vladimir Ashkenazy; the orchestral work Autumn Gardens (1998), commissioned by the Scottish Chamber Orchestra; and the Eighth Symphony "The Journey", commissioned by the Philadelphia Orchestra.

=== 2000s ===
Rautavaara's later works include the orchestral works Book of Visions (2003–2005), Manhattan Trilogy (2003–2005) and Before the Icons (2005), which is an expanded version of his early piano work Icons. In 2005 he finished a work for violin and piano called Lost Landscapes, commissioned by the violinist Midori Goto. His orchestral work A Tapestry of Life was premiered by the New Zealand Symphony Orchestra in April 2008, directed by Pietari Inkinen. Rautavaara wrote a percussion concerto called Incantations for Colin Currie in 2008 and a second cello concerto Towards the Horizon for Truls Mørk in 2009.

=== 2010s ===
In 2010 Rautavaara's "Christmas Carol" was commissioned and performed by the men and boys choir of King's College, Cambridge (UK) for their annual Festival of Nine Lessons and Carols. In 2011 Rautavaara completed two larger-scale compositions: Missa a Cappella (premiered in the Netherlands, November 2011) and a work for string orchestra, Into the Heart of Light, which premiered in September 2012.

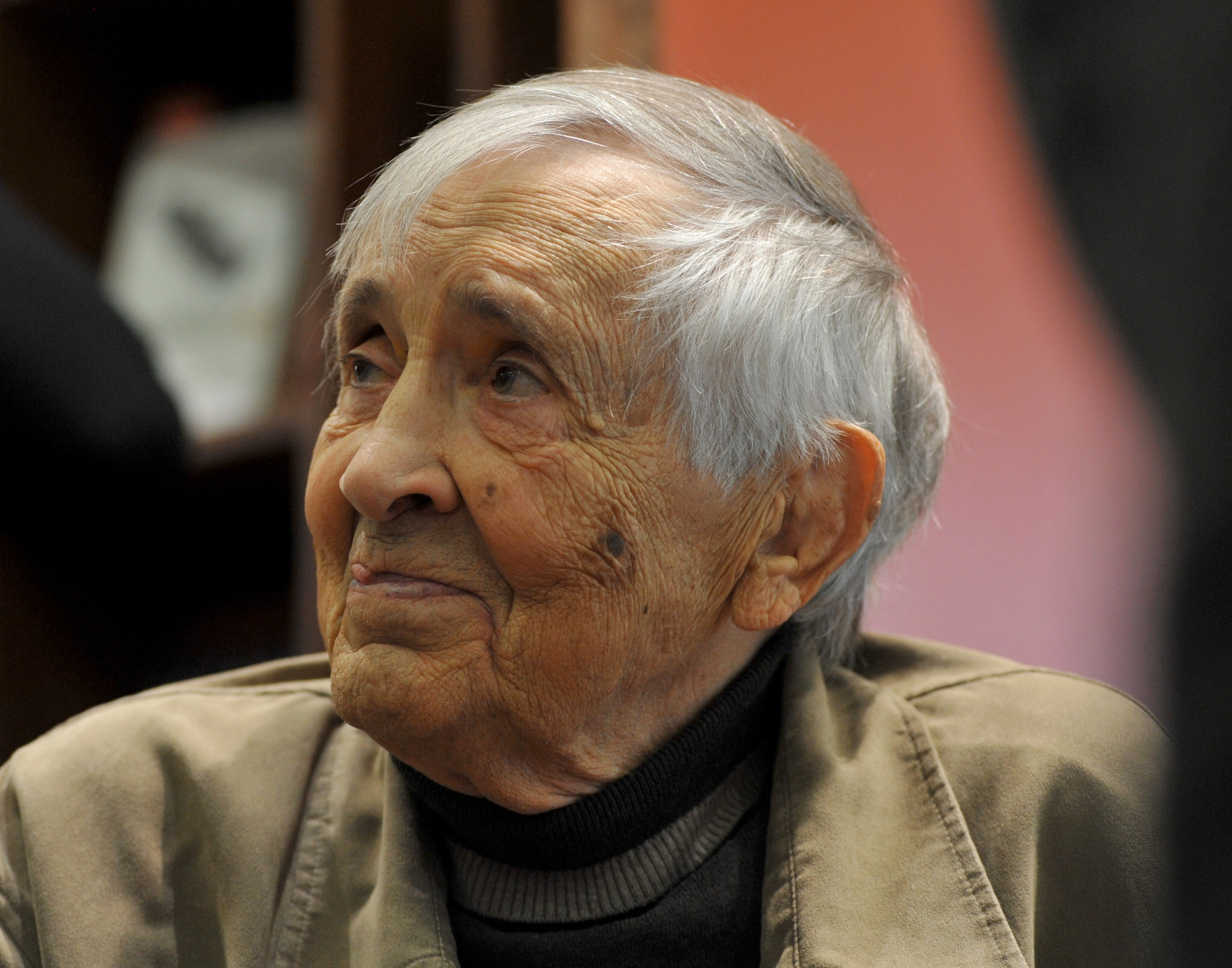
Rautavaara in 2014

His last major work for violin and orchestra, entitled Fantasia, was commissioned by violinist Anne Akiko Meyers and recorded with the Philharmonia Orchestra, and released after his death in 2016. It was premiered with the Helsinki Philharmonic with his widow and son in attendance in December 2018. Rautavaara did not live to see the first opera stage première of Kaivos, the uncensored version, which took place 21 October 2016 in Budapest, Hungary.

Manuscripts of two serenades for violin and orchestra (Deux Sérénades) were presented by his widow to conductor Mikko Franck after his funeral. The serenades are titled Sérénade pour mon amour (Serenade to My Love) and Sérénade pour la vie (Serenade to Life). The first of the two was completed, while only the solo violin part for the second was completed, with sketches for the orchestra. Kalevi Aho, Rautavaara's student, completed its orchestration. The two serenades were written for violinist Hilary Hahn and were premiered in February 2019 by the violinist and the Orchestre Philharmonique de Radio France under Franck's direction. In the studio album titled "Paris" released in March 2021, the serenades were recorded with the same artists, along with Ernest Chausson's Poème for Violin and Orchestra and Sergey Prokofiev's Violin Concerto No.1.

== Bibliography ==
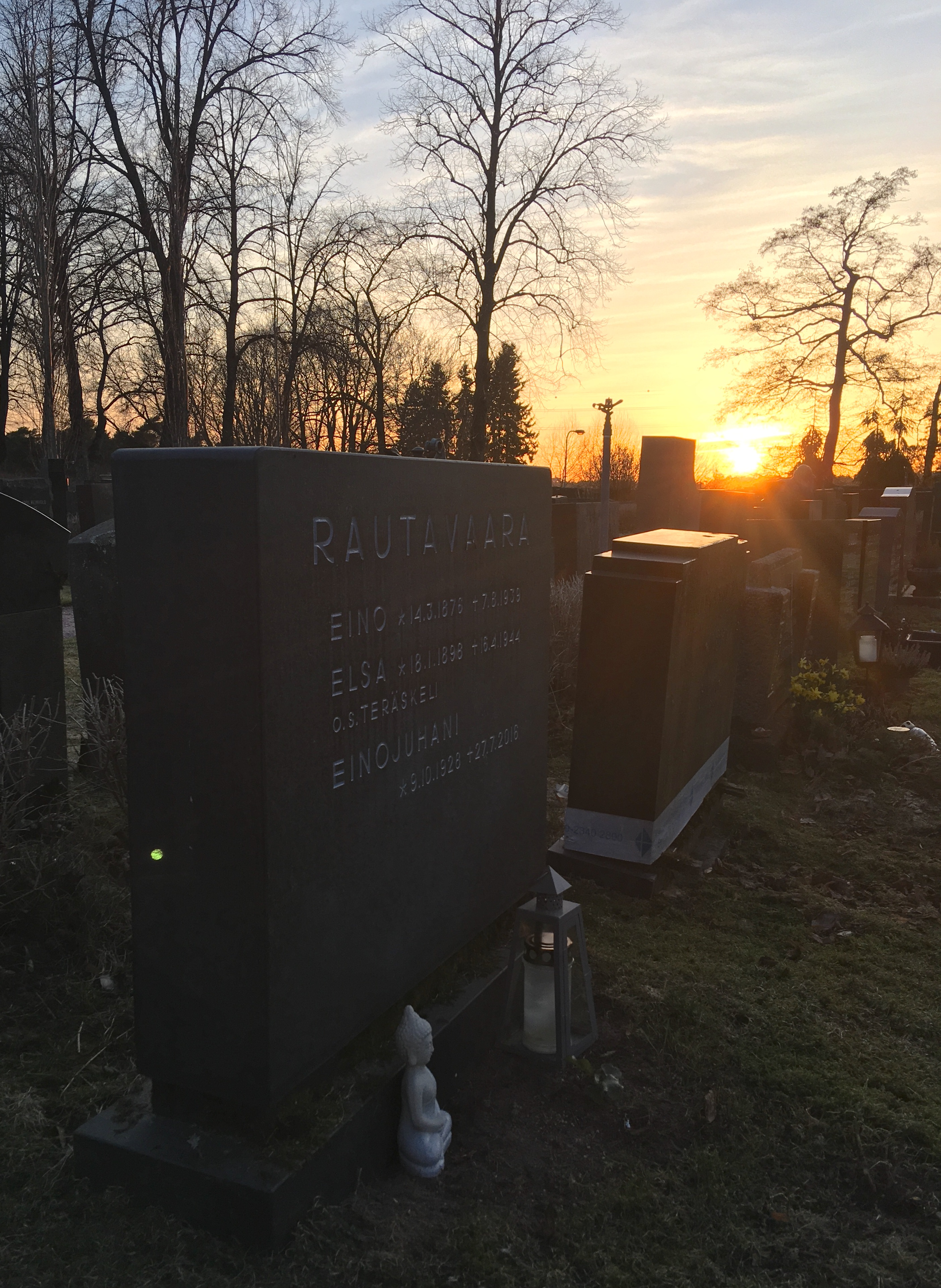
The grave of Rautavaara at Hietaniemi Cemetery, Helsinki

- Rautavaara, Einojuhani (October 1985). "Thomas: Analysis of the Tone Material". Finnish Music Quarterly. 1–2. Translated by Moore, William: 47–53.
- —— (1989). Omakuva [Self-portrait] (in Finnish). Porvoo: W. Söderström. ISBN 978-951-0-16015-2.
- —— (1990). "Vincentius inter disciplinas: tasoja, paralleeleja, heijastumia, limittyviä aspekteja oopperassa Vincent" [Levels, parallels, reflections, overlapping aspects in the opera Vincent]. Synteesi (in Finnish). 9 (2–3): 123–130.
- —— (1991). "Traditiotietoisuus" [Consciousness of tradition]. In Otonkoski, L. (ed.). Klang: uusin musiikki [Klang: The Latest Music] (in Finnish). Jyväskylä. pp. 199–221.
- —— (1995). "Der Ausgleich der Extreme als Ziel" [The Aim is to Balance the Extremes]. In Ulm, Renate (ed.). "Eine Sprache der Gegenwart": Musica viva 1945–1995 ["A Language of the Present": Musica viva 1945–1995] (in German). Mainz: Schott. pp. 284–91. ISBN 978-3-7957-8361-7. Also Munich: Piper
- —— (1995). "On a Taste for the Infinite". Contemporary Music Review. 12 (2): 109–115. doi:10.1080/07494469500640211.
- —— (1998). Mieltymyksestä äärettömään [A taste for the infinite] (in Finnish). Porvoo; Helsinki; Juva: WSOY. ISBN 978-951-0-22878-4. OCLC 58321956.

== Discography ==
The majority of Rautavaara's works have been recorded by Ondine. These include a cycle of his complete symphonies and several operas and two Grammy-nominated albums. Some of his major works have also been recorded by Naxos. An album of vocal works called "Rautavaara Songs" was recorded by the Swedish label BIS Records. In 2019 a recording of Lost Landscapes, performed by Joanna Kamenarska on the violin and Moisès Fernández Via on the piano, was released by the Mexican label Urtext Digital Classics. Pekka Kuusisto and Paavali Jumppanen also recorded the piece for Ondine in 2011.
