= List of compositions by Aulis Sallinen =

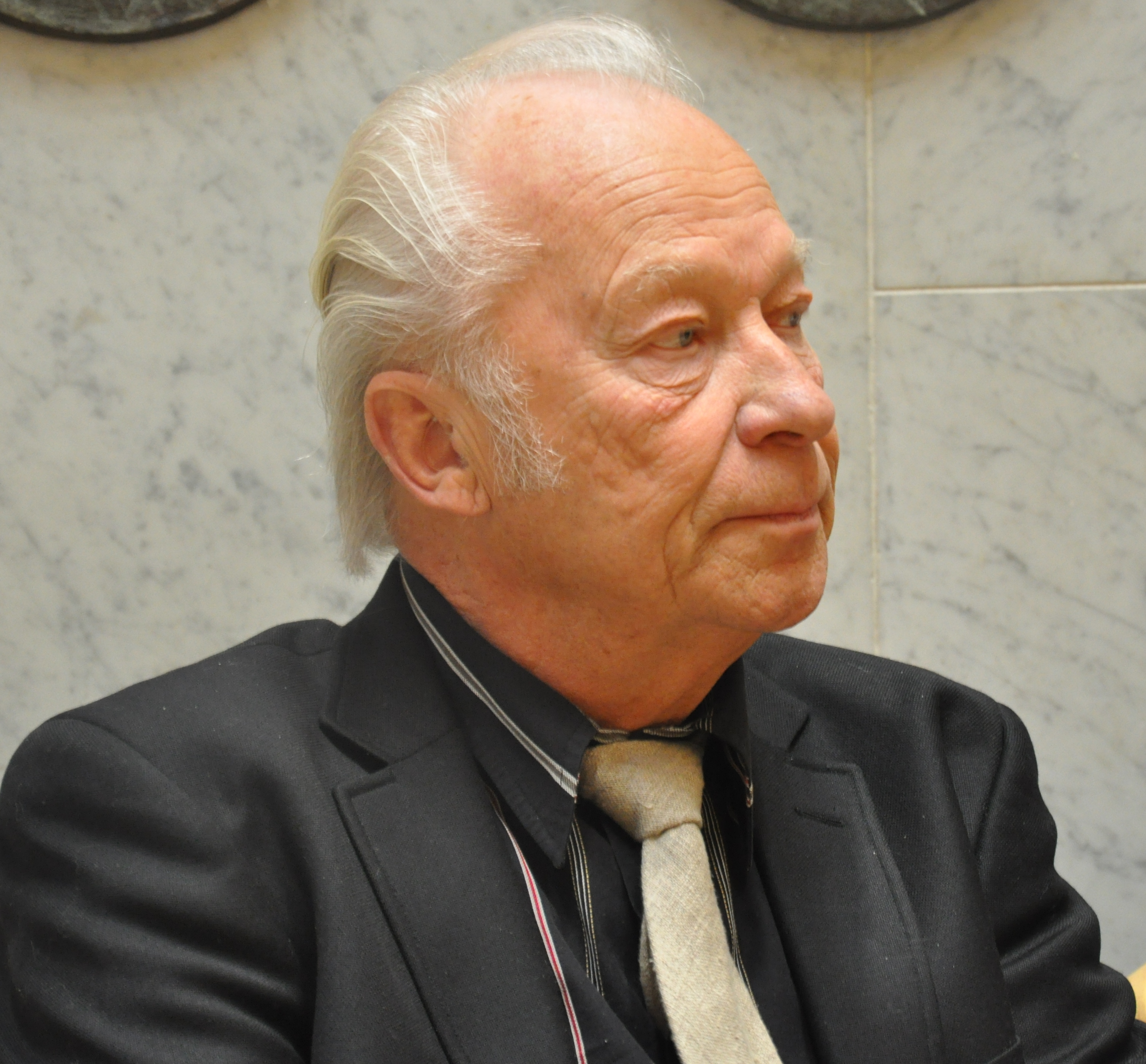
Aulis Sallinen in 2009

The following is a list of works by Aulis Sallinen (b. 1935), presented as a sortable table with eight parameters per composition: title, category (orchestral, chamber, or unaccompanied choral), catalogue number, average duration (in minutes), year of composition, genre, and—if applicable—text author(s); for some compositions, comments are provided, as well. The table's default ordering is by genre and, within a genre, by date. To assist with navigation, the infobox provides page-jumps to the first entry for each group.

== Oeuvre ==
The compositional career of Finnish composer Aulis Sallinen has extended over six decades, from his first composition, Two Mythical Scenes for Orchestra (Op. 1, 1956), to his most recent work, the Chamber Music X (Op. 114, 2018). Although Sallinen has composed across many genres—his oeuvre includes large-scale orchestral compositions, works for stage, chamber music, choral songs, pieces for instrumental soloist, etc.—his reputation rests primarily on his eight symphonies (1971–2001) and his seven operas (1973–2017).

Reflecting Sallinen's standing, each of the last four symphonies has resulted from an international commission: the Fifth, Washington Mosaics (Op. 57, 1985–87) for the National Symphony Orchestra (then under the direction of Mstislav Rostropovich); the Sixth, From a New Zealand Diary (Op. 65, 1990) for the New Zealand Symphony Orchestra; the Seventh, The Dreams of Gandalf (Op. 71, 1996) for the Gothenburg Symphony Orchestra; and, the Eighth, Autumnal Fragments (Op. 81, 2001) for the Royal Concertgebouw Orchestra.

When at work on an opera, Sallinen tends to compose simultaneously smaller "satellite" pieces, which share thematic material with their respective large-scale parents. Many of these compositions are substantial (rather than derivative) works, including: Four Dream Songs, Op. 30 (from The Horseman, Op. 32); Shadows, Op. 52 (from The King Goes Forth to France, Op. 53); The Palace Rhapsody, Op. 72 (from The Palace, Op. 68); and, A Solemn Overture, Op. 75 (from King Lear, Op. 76).

== List of compositions ==
Compositions by Aulis Sallinen
Title	Category	Op.	Length	Year	Genre	Text	Comments
16 mins.	Symphony No. 1 (N)	Orchestral	24	1970–71	Symphony		In one movement; won first prize in a composers' competition the City of Helsinki sponsored to mark the inauguration of Finlandia Hall; originally called Sinfonia
16 mins.	Symphony No. 2, Symphonic Dialogue (N)	Orchestral	29	1972	Symphony Percussion, orch.		In one movement; essentially a 'symphony-concerto' for solo percussionist and orchestra; dedicated to Rainer Kuisma; originally called Symphonic Dialogue for Solo Percussion Player and Orchestra
27 mins.	Symphony No. 3 (N)	Orchestral	35	1974–75	Symphony		Commission from the Finnish Broadcasting Company; Sallinen's first multi-movement symphony
22 mins.	Symphony No. 4 (N)	Orchestral	49	1978–79	Symphony		Commission from the City of Turku to commemorate its 750th anniversary
37 mins.	Symphony No. 5, Washington Mosaics (N)	Orchestral	57	1984–85; r. 1987	Symphony		Commission from the National Symphony Orchestra; in 1987, Sallinen simplified and shortened the finale
40 mins.	Symphony No. 6, From a New Zealand Diary (N)	Orchestral	65	1989–90	Symphony		Commission from the New Zealand Symphony Orchestra; the finale is subtitled with an excerpt from a poem by Allen Curnow
25 mins.	Symphony No. 7, The Dreams of Gandalf (N)	Orchestral	71	1995–96	Symphony		In one movement; commission from the Gothenburg Symphony Orchestra; material originally intended for a ballet based on The Lord of the Rings which, due to copyright issues, the composer abandoned; in 2001, the ballet The Hobbit, Op. 78, eventually came to fruition, using material from the Seventh Symphony, as well as from Sallinen's other compositions
20 mins.	Symphony No. 8, Autumnal Fragments (N)	Orchestral	81	2000–01	Symphony		In one movement; commission from the Royal Concertgebouw Orchestra; partially inspired by the events of September 11, Sallinen quotes the Theme of the Dead (e.g., Act II, scene 4) from his opera Kullervo, Op. 61
120 mins.	The Horseman (FG) (fi: Ratsumies)	Orchestra & voice	32	1973–74	Opera (3 acts) Soloists, choir, orch.	P. Haavikko (librettist & playwright)	Sung in Finnish; commission from the Savonlinna Opera Festival—and first prize in its composers' competition—in celebration of the 500th anniversary of Olavinlinna in 1975; winner of the 1978 Nordic Council Music Prize
115 mins.	The Red Line (N) (fi: Punainen viiva)	Orchestra & voice	46	1976–78	Opera (2 acts) Soloists, choir, orch.	A. Sallinen (librettist) & I. Kianto (novelist)	Based on the 1911 novel by Ilmari Kianto and sung in Finnish; commission from the Finnish National Opera
130 mins.	The King Goes Forth to France (N) (fi: Kuningas lähtee Ranskaan)	Orchestra & voice	53	1980–83	Opera (3 acts) Soloists, choir, orch.	P. Haavikko (librettist & playwright)	Subtitled "a chronicle for the music theatre of the coming Ice Age"; based on the 1974 radio play by Paavo Haavikko and sung in Finnish; joint commission from the Savonlinna Opera Festival, the Royal Opera House, and the BBC; material from Act III related to the orchestral prelude Shadows, Op. 52
145 mins.	Kullervo (N)	Orchestra & voice	61	1986–88	Opera (2 acts) Soloists, choir, orch.	A. Sallinen (librettist), A. Kivi (playwright), & Kalevala (Runos 31–6)	Based on the character from the Finnish national epic, the Kalevala, as well as the 1864 play by Aleksis Kivi (which differs from the epic in a number of ways); sung in Finnish; commission from the Finnish National Opera to mark the inauguration of its new Opera House
120 mins.	The Palace (N) (fi: Palatsi)	Orchestra & voice	68	1991–93	Opera (3 acts) Soloists, choir, orch.	I. Dische & H. Enzensberger (librettists)	Sung in Finnish (translation by Sallinen); commission from the Savonlinna Opera Festival
150 mins.	King Lear (N) (fi: Kuningas Lear)	Orchestra & voice	76	19??–99	Opera (2 acts) Soloists, choir, orch.	A. Sallinen (librettist) & Shakespeare (playwright)	Based on Matti Rossi's translation of Shakespeare's play; sung in Finnish; commission from the Finnish National Opera
75 mins.	The Castle in the Water (N) (fi: Linna vedessä)	Orchestra & voice	106	2014–17	Opera (12 numbers) Soloists, choir, orch.	A. Sallinen (librettist) & L. Nummi (poet)	Subtitled "a chronicle for a narrator, four singers, chamber orchestra, and [the acoustics and visual of] Olavinlinna"; based on the 1975 poem collection by Lassi Nummi and sung in Finnish; commission from the Savonlinna Opera Festival to celebrate the 100th anniversary of Finland's independence
24 mins.	Variations on Mallarmé (fr: Variations sur Mallarmé)	Orchestral	16	1967	Ballet (1 act)		Inspired by the poetry of Stéphane Mallarmé; commission from the Finnish National Opera; staged under the title Sensuelleja muunnelmia (Sensual Variations); choreography by Elsa Sylvestersson, libretto by Pentti Karhunmaa
56 mins.	The Hobbit (N) (fi: Hobbiti)	Orchestral	78	2000–01	Ballet (2 acts)		Subtitled "ballet for young dancers"; in the mid-1990s, Sallinen had to abandon the idea of a ballet based on The Lord of the Rings, due to copyright issues, and material for the project was reworked into the Symphony No. 7, The Dreams of Gandalf, Op. 71. In 2001, the Op. 78 ballet The Hobbit eventually came to fruition, using material from the Seventh Symphony, as well as from Sallinen's other compositions; choreography by Marjo Kuusela, libretto by Heini Tola
18 mins.	Violin Concerto (FG)	Orchestral	18	1968	Concerto Violin, orch.		Composed for a composers' competition hosted by the Finnish Broadcasting Company
23 mins.	Cello Concerto (N)	Orchestral	44	1976	Concerto Cello, orch.		Commission from the Finnish Broadcasting Company
22 mins.	Flute Concerto, Harlequin (N)	Orchestral	70	1995	Concerto Flute, orch.		
20 mins.	Horn Concerto, Campane ed Arie (N) (Bells and Arias)	Orchestral	82	2002	Concerto Horn, orch.		Written on suggestion from the Horn Club of Finland; composed in honor of the 85th birthday anniversary of Karl Henrik Pentti
24 mins.	Chamber Concerto (N)	Orchestral	87	2004–05	Concerto Violin, piano, strings		Commission from the Tapiola Sinfonietta
21 mins.	Concerto for Clarinet, Viola, and Chamber Orchestra (N)	Orchestral	91	2006–07	Concerto Clarinet, viola, orch.		Commission from the Finnish Radio Symphony Orchestra
19 mins.	Concerto for Cor anglais and Chamber Orchestra (N)	Orchestral	97	2010	Concerto Cor anglais, orch.		Commission from the Helsinki Philharmonic Orchestra
20 mins.	Concerto for Two Accordions, String Orchestra, and Percussion (N)	Orchestral	115	2018–19	Concerto 2 accordions, strings, percussion		Joint commission from the Kokkola Winter Accordion Festival and the Ostrobothnian Chamber Orchestra
18 mins.	Variations for Cello and Orchestra	Orchestral	5	1961	Concertino Cello, orch.		
20 mins.	Metamorphosen (Metamorphoses)	Orchestral	11^{w}	1964	Concertino Piano, chamber orch.		Thematically develops Sallinen's pedagogical work for cello, Elegy for Sebastian Knight, Op. 10; Sallinen withdrew Metamorphosen shortly after its premiere, replacing it in 2000 with a revised version in which the orchestration of the original is reduced to strings only, eliminating the woodwinds. This new version was renamed Metamorphoses of Elegy for Sebastian Knight and added to the Chamber Musics series as No. 4 (see Op. 79)
20 mins.	Chamber Music IV, Metamorphoses of Elegy for Sebastian Knight (N) (fi: Metamorfooseja Elegiasta Sebastian Knightille)	Orchestral	79	1964; r. 2000	Concertino Piano, strings		Originally called Metamorphosen (Metamorphoses, Op. 11, 1964), which thematically develops Sallinen's pedagogical work for cello, Elegy for Sebastian Knight, Op. 10; Sallinen withdrew Metamorphosen shortly after its premiere, replacing it in 2000 with a revised version in which the orchestration of the original is reduced to strings only, eliminating the woodwinds
14 mins.	Chamber Music II (N)	Orchestral	41	1976	Concertino Alto flute, strings		
20 mins.	Chamber Music III, The Nocturnal Dances of Don Juanquixote (N) (fi: Don Juanquijoten yölliset tanssit)	Orchestral	58	1985–86	Concertino Cello, strings		Commission from the Naantali Music Festival and described by Sallinen as "an aging composer's farewell to youth"; the pseudo-literary title is a compound of iconic, fictional characters Don Juan and Don Quixote
10 mins.	Introduction and Tango Overture (N)	Orchestral	74b	1997; a. 1997(?)	Concertino Piano, strings		Arrangement of the original piece for piano quintet, Op. 74; material for the introduction is related to the end of the Symphony No. 7, The Dreams of Gandalf, Op. 71; joint commission from Kitakyushu International Music Festival and the Forbidden City Music Festival in Beijing
20 mins.	Chamber Music V, Barabbas Variations (N) (fi: Barabbas-variaatioita)	Orchestral	80	2000	Concertino Accordion, strings		Based on material from the chamber oratorio Barabbas Dialogues, Op. 84 (2002–03), for narrator, vocal soloists, and small instrumental ensemble; adapted for piano and strings (with Sallinen's permission) in 2006 as Op. 80a Ralf Gothóni.
20 mins.	Chamber Music V, Barabbas Variations (N) (fi: Barabbas-variaatioita)	Orchestral	80a	2000; a. 2005	Concertino Piano, strings		Arrangement, with Sallinen's permission and by Ralf Gothóni, of the original piece for accordion solo and string orchestra, Op. 80; based on material from the chamber oratorio Barabbas Dialogues, Op. 84 (2002–03), for narrator, vocal soloists, and small instrumental ensemble
20 mins.	Chamber Music VI, Trois invitations au voyage (N) (fi: Kolme kutsua matkalle)	Orchestral	88	2005–06	Concertino String quartet, strings		Joint commission from l'Association Musique Nouvelle en Liberte, Ville de Paris, and Mécenat Musical Société General
20 mins.	Chamber Music VII, Cruselliana (N)	Orchestral	93	2007–08	Concertino Wind quintet, strings		Commission from the Crusell Week in Uusikaupunki
16 mins.	Chamber Music VIII, The Trees, All Their Green (N) (fi: Puut, kaikki heidän vihreytensä)	Orchestral	94	2008–09	Concertino Cello, strings		Paavo Haavikko in memoriam; Sallinen subtitled the work after Haavikko's poetry collection, The trees, all their green (1966); joint commission from the Amsterdam Sinfonietta; the Würtembergische Kammerorchester; the Scottish Ensemble; and, the Sydney Conservatorium
15 mins.	Chamber Music X (N)	Orchestral	114	2018	Concertino Violin, harp, strings		Based on the Violin Sonata, Op. 113
15 mins.	Three Lyrical Songs of Death (n.p.) (fi: Kolme lyyrillistä laulua kuolemasta): 1) God is everything ...; 2) When I have a ...; 3) When I die ...	Orchestra & voice	6	1962; r. 1966	Song cycle (3 numbers) Baritone, male chorus, chamber orch.	Laulupuu	Sung in Finnish; commission from the YL Male Voice Choir; originally the instrumental accompaniment was for chamber ensemble, but in 1966 Sallinen revised the work (without changing the vocal parts) to be for chamber orchestra
14 mins.	Suite grammaticale (FG) (fi: Kieliopillinen sarja): 1) Die erste Deklination (The First Declension); 2) Intermezzo; 3) Quelle heure est-il? (What Time Is It?); 4) Etudes; 5) Dialogues	Orchestra & voice	28	1971	Song cycle (5 numbers) Children's chorus, strings, school instruments, kantele	? ? (lyricist)	No. 1 sung in German; No. 3 sung in French; No. 5 sung in English; Nos. 2 and 4 are instrumental interludes.
24 mins.	Dies Irae (N)	Orchestra & voice	47	1978	Cantata Soloists, male chorus, orch.	A. Turtiainen (lyricist)	Soprano and bass soloists, who describe the Earth destroyed by nuclear war on Christmas Day; sung in Finnish; commission from the Ensemble of the Hungarian People's Army
29 mins.	The Iron Age Suite (N) (fi: Rauta-aika-sarja): 1) The Wedding Procession of Ilmari and the Golden Woman; 2) The Song of Aino; 3) Lemminki in Pohjola; 4) Lemminki Hunts the Devil's Elk; 5) Lemminki in Tuonela; 6) Väinö's Song; 7) Lemminki and the Maidens of the Island	Orchestra & voice	55	1978–82	Incidental (7 numbers) Soloists, mixed chorus, children's chorus, orch.	P. Haavikko (lyricist)	Based on myths from the Finnish national epic, the Kalevala and sung in Finnish; arranged from the incidental music Sallinen had written for the Finnish television film The Iron Age
50 mins.	Songs of Life and Death (N) (fi: Elämän ja kuoleman lauluja): 1) Like Floodwaters the Days of My Life; 2) We Wander Here; 3) I, Unborn; 4) Tuba mirum; 5) I Can Think You Departed; 6) Dies irae; 7) While You Are Still on This Shore; 8) Live a Full Life	Orchestra & voice	69	1993–95	Song cycle (8 numbers) Baritone (or mezzo-soprano), mixed chorus, orch.	L. Nummi (lyricist)	A 'requiem' sung in Finnish, with a composer's note on the score that reads, "Dedicated to all my Dead, to those whose memory and strength still lingers this side of the border"; commission from the Helsinki Philharmonic Orchestra
23 mins.	...memories, memories... (N): 1) Introduction; 2) Vintern var hård (Winter was Hard); 3) Anthem for Ants; 4) Kansanlaulun tapaan (Little Folk Songs); 5) Interlude I; 6) Hold Fast Your Dream; 7) Interlude II; 8) Joshua Fought the Battle of Jericho; 9) Balladi	Orchestra & voice	99	2011	Song cycle (9 numbers) Children's choir, pf, strings	Various sources	Commission from the Tapiola Choir; instrumental introduction and two interludes are for piano and strings; No. 2 by Bo Carpelan (sung in Swedish), No. 3 by Sallinen (in English), No. 4 by Eila Kivikkaho (in Finnish), No. 6 by Louise Driscoll (in English), No. 8 from traditional (in English), and No. 9 traditional from the Kalteletar (in Finnish)
14 mins.	Four Dream Songs (FG) (fi: Neljä laulua unesta): 1) Man made from sleep; 2) Cradle song for a dead horseman; 3) Three dreams each within each; 4) There is no stream	Orchestra & voice	30	1972–73	Song cycle (4 numbers) Soprano, orch.	P. Haavikko (lyricist)	From Sallinen's opera The Horseman, Op. 32; sung in Finnish; version also for soprano and piano
25 mins.	Five Portraits of Women (N) (fi: Viisi naismuotokuvaa): 1) Tuiskuaa lunta (It is still snowing); 2) Carolinen häät (Caroline’s Wedding); 3) Minä odotan sinua, paimen (When we meet this evening); 4) Itkenkö minä sinua? (How can you ask if I’ll mourn you?); 5) On tämä silta tehty naisista (That’s the bridge that’s made of womankind)	Orchestra & voice	100	1976–88; r. 2012	Song cycle (5 numbers) Soprano (or mezzo-soprano), horn, chamber orch.	A. Sallinen & P. Haavikko (lyricists)	Commission from the Finnish National Opera; Sung in Finnish; Sallinen derived the songs from arias to three of his operas: The Red Line (No. 1), The King Goes Forth to France (Nos. 2 and 5, and Kullervo (Nos. 3–4); despite minimal changes to the vocal lines, the orchestral accompaniments are heavily revised
10 mins.	Chamber Music IX, Nocturne	Orchestra & voice	112	2017	Concertante Soprano, strings	E. Leino (lyricist)	Sung in Finnish
12 mins.	Two Mythical Scenes for Orchestra (fi: Kaksi myyttistä kuvaa orkesterille)	Orchestral	1	1956	Other orchestral		
22 mins.	Concerto for Chamber Orchestra	Orchestral	3	1959–60	Other orchestral		
11 mins.	Mauermusik (FG) (Wall Music)	Orchestral	7	1962	Other orchestral		Subtitled "To the memory of a young German" (the piece was inspired by the killing of a young man at the Berlin Wall in East Germany)
12 mins.	Variations for Orchestra (N)	Orchestral	8	1963	Other orchestral		Commission from the Youth Orchestra of the Klemetti Institute, Finland
13 mins.	Some Aspects of Peltoniemi Hintrik's Funeral March (FG) (fi: Aspekteja Peltoniemen Hintrikin surumarssista)	Orchestral	19[a]	1969; a. 1981	Other orchestral Strings		In one movement; Sallinen's arrangement for string orchestra of his String Quartet No. 3, Some Aspects of Peltoniemi Hintrik's Funeral March (see Op. 19); the subtitle refers to a famous Finnish fiddler tune; commission from the Swedish National Concert Institute
11 mins.	Chorali (FG)	Orchestral	22	1970	Other orchestral 32 winds, harp, celesta, percussion		Commission from the Helsinki Festival; Sallinen has speculated that Chorali may have been the origin of the 'mosaic technique' he subsequently utilized for the String Quartet No. 5, Pieces of Mosaic, Op. 54; the Symphony No. 5, Washington Mosaics, Op. 57; and, Chamber Music III, Op. 58
13 mins.	Chamber Music I (N)	Orchestral	38	1975	Other orchestral Strings		
11 mins.	Shadows (N)	Orchestral	52	1982	Other orchestral		Prelude for orchestra; material related to Act III of the opera The King Goes Forth to France; commission from the National Symphony Orchestra
16 mins.	From a Schoolchild's Diary (N) (fi: Koululaisen päiväkirjasta)	Orchestral	62	1989	Other orchestral Strings		Scored for double children's orchestra, composed of violins and cellos only; commission from the Helsinki Junior Strings
6 mins.	Sunrise Serenade (N)	Orchestral	63	1989	Other orchestral 2 trumpets, pf, strings		Composed to commemorate the 100th anniversary of the Kansallis-Osake Pankki; the second trumpet plays off-stage
16 mins.	The Palace Rhapsody (N)	Orchestral	72	1996	Other orchestral Winds, pf, harp, percussion		Based on music from the opera The Palace, Op. 68; joint commission from the Royal Northern College of Music in Manchester, and the College Band Directors National Association of the U.S.
10 mins.	A Solemn Overture (King Lear) (N) (fr: Ouverture Solennel)	Orchestral	75	1997	Other orchestral		Based on material Sallinen was preparing for the opera King Lear, Op. 76; commission from the Orchestre Philharmonique de Monte-Carlo on occasion of the 700th anniversary of the Grimaldi family
13 mins.	Serenadi 1963 (n.p.)	Chamber	9	1963	Ensemble Wind quartet, brass quartet		
2 mins.	Fanfare (N)	Chamber	59	1986	Ensemble 11 brass players & percussion		Commission from the Houston Symphony Orchestra, for the Citicorp Houston Symphony Fanfare Project (on occasion of the Texas Sesquicentennial)
14 mins.	Echoes from a Play (N)	Chamber	66	1990	Quintet Oboe, 2 vl, va, vc		Commission from Thomas Gallant; based on material from Sallinen's opera The Palace, Op. 68
10 mins.	Introduction and Tango Overture (N)	Chamber	74	1997	Quintet pf, 2 vl, va, vc		Material for the introduction is related to the end of the Symphony No. 7, The Dreams of Gandalf, Op. 71; joint commission from Kitakyushu International Music Festival and the Forbidden City Music Festival in Beijing; also an arrangement for piano and string orchestra (see Op. 74b)
15 mins.	Piano Quintet [No. 1], ...des morceaux oublies (N) (Forgotten Pieces)	Chamber	85	2003–04	Quintet pf, 2 vl, va, vc		Commission from "Art, Culture et Tradition" (Saint Paul)
8 mins.	Mistral Music (N)	Chamber	90a	2006; a. 2008	Quintet flute, 2 vl, va, vc		Arrangement of the original work for flute and piano (Op. 90)
16 mins.	Piano Quintet No. 2, Three Kullervo Elegies (N) (fi: Kolme Kullervo-elegiaa)	Chamber	92	2007	Quintet pf, 2 vl, va, vc		Commission from the Kalevalaseura-säätio (Kalevala Society Foundation) in celebration of the 160th anniversary of the Kalevala; some material is related to Sallinen's opera Kullervo, Op. 61
17 mins.	Quattro per Quattro (FG) (Four Movements for Four Players)	Chamber	12	1965	Quartet Oboe (or flute or clarinet), vl, vc, harpsichord		Commission from the Turku Conservatoire
13 mins.	String Quartet No. 1 (FG)	Chamber	2	1958	Quartet 2 vl, va, vc		
10 mins.	String Quartet No. 2, Canzona (FG)	Chamber	4	1960	Quartet 2 vl, va, vc		
13 mins.	String Quartet No. 3, Some Aspects of Peltoniemi Hintrik's Funeral March (FG) (fi: Aspekteja Peltoniemen Hintrikin surumarssista)	Chamber	19	1969	Quartet 2 vl, va, vc		In one movement; the subtitle refers to a famous Finnish fiddler tune; commission from the Swedish National Concert Institute; also arranged for string orchestra (see Op. 19[a])
14 mins.	String Quartet No. 4, Quiet Songs (FG) (fi: Hiljaisia lauluja)	Chamber	25	1971	Quartet 2 vl, va, vc		In one movement; commission from the Jyväskylä Arts Festival
25 mins.	String Quartet No. 5, Pieces of Mosaic (N) (fi: Mosaiikinpaloja)	Chamber	54	1983	Quartet 2 vl, va, vc		In 16 pieces; joint commission from the Kuhmo Chamber Festival and the Helsinki Festival
18 mins.	String Quartet No. 6 (N)	Chamber	103	2013–14	Quartet 2 vl, va, vc		Commission from the Kimito Island Music Festival
16 mins.	Dance Music Suite (N) (fi: Tanssimusiikki sarja): 1) The Halting Waltz; 2) Flamencolia; 3) Slowar Gestures; 4) A Gentle Bolero Waltz; 5) The Very Last Tango	Chamber	107	2017	Quartet Accordion, pf, va, vc		
3 mins.	Wind Fanfare (N) (fi: Vantaa-fanfaari)	Chamber	27	1971	Trio 3 trumpets		
18 mins.	Piano Trio, Les visions fugitives (N) (Fugitive Visions)	Chamber	96	2009–10	Trio pf, vl, vc		Commission from the Naantali Music Festival
6 mins.	Quatre études (FG) (Neljä etydiä)	Chamber	21	1970	Duo vl, pf		Pedagogical works
15 mins.	Violin Sonata (N)	Chamber	113	2018	Duo vl, pf		
7 mins.	Metamorfora (FG)	Chamber	34	1974	Duo vc, pf		Pedagogical work; first prize in the Music Society of Turku's Cello Competition; arrangement for double bass and piano by Saara Hakkila in collaboration with Sallinen
13 mins.	From a Swan Song (N)	Chamber	67	1990–91	Duo vc, pf		Pedagogical work; commission from the Naantali Music Festival for the First International Paulo Cello Competition; based on the King's 'swan song' from Act III of Sallinen's opera The Palace, Op. 68
22 mins.	Cello Sonata (N)	Chamber	86	2004	Duo vc, pf		Commission from the Naatali Music Festival
6 mins.	Baumgesang mit Epilog (N)	Chamber	?	2013	Duo vc, pf		
8 mins.	Mistral Music (N)	Chamber	90	2006	Duo Flute, pf		Also an arrangement for flute and string quartet (Op. 90a)
12 mins.	Canti per vallis gratiae (N)	Chamber	104	2014	Duo pf, organ		Commission from the Naatali Music Festival
4 mins.	Cadenza (FG)	Chamber	13	1965	Solo instrument Violin		Pedagogical work; first prize in the competition for the International Jean Sibelius Violin Competition in 1965
5 mins.	Ritornello (FG)	Chamber	36	1975	Solo instrument Violin		
? mins.	Canto (FG)	Chamber	37	1975	Solo instrument Violin		
5 mins.	Elegy for Sebastian Knight (FG) (fi: Elegia Sebastian Knightille)	Chamber	10	1964	Solo instrument Cello		Pedagogical work inspired by Nabokov's; The Real Life of Sebastian Knight; arrangement for double bass by Saara Hakkila in collaboration with Sallinen; serves as the thematic ancestor of Sallinen's Chamber Music IV, Metamorphoses on Elegy for Sebastian Knight, Op. 79 (see also the withdrawn Op. 11, titled Metamorphosen)
12 mins.	Sonata for Solo Cello (FG)	Chamber	26	1971	Solo instrument Cello		
3 mins.	Notturno (FG)	Chamber	14	1966	Solo instrument Piano		Pedagogical work
1 min.	King Lear's Distant War (N)	Chamber	79	2000	Solo instrument Piano		
1 min.	The Sigh of Barabbas (N)	Chamber	83	2003	Solo instrument Piano		Derived from the chamber work, Barabbas Dialogues, Op. 84
11 min.	Eight Miniatures for Piano (N) (fi: Kahdeksan miniatyyriä pianolle): 1) Pianistico I; 2) Melodiaco; 3) Lauf; 4) Nameless; 5) Melodiaco II; 6) Pace I; 7) Pace II; 8) Pianistico II	Chamber	110	2017	Solo instrument Piano		
7 mins.	Chaconne (FG)	Chamber	23	1970	Solo instrument Organ		
10 mins.	Preludes and Fugues (N)	Chamber	95b	2009; a. 2013	Solo instrument Organ		Arranged from the original work for solo accordion (Op. 95)
9 mins.	Three Adagios (N)	Chamber	102	2013	Solo instrument Organ		
9 mins.	Variazioni per organo (N) (fi: Muunnelmi uruil)	Chamber	104	2014	Solo instrument Organ		Commission from the Crusell Music Festival
5 mins.	Ritorno ()	Chamber	122	2024	Solo instrument Organ		Commissioned by Kalevi Kiviniemi (who died before he could perform it), and dedicated to his memory
10 mins.	Preludes and Fugues (N)	Chamber	95	2009	Solo instrument Accordion		Also an arrangement for solo organ (Op. 95b)
4 mins.	Two Songs for Children and Piano (FG) (fi: Kaksi laulua lapsille ja pianolle): 1) Vintern var hård (Winter was Hard); 2) Den första snön (The First Snow)	Chamber & voice	20	1969	Song cycle (2 numbers) Children's choir & pf	B. Carpelan (lyricist)	Sung in Swedish
50 mins.	Barabbas Dialogues (N) (fi: Barabbas dialogeja): 1) Dialogue 1: Nocturne; 2) Dialogue 2: Easter I; 3) Dialogue 3: Easter II; 4) Dialogue 4: Easter III; 5) Dialogue 5: Pas de deux; 6) Dialogue 6: Passacaglia; 7) Dialogue 7: Finale	Chamber & voice	84	2002–03	Cantata (7 numbers) Narrator, soloists, pf, accordion, chamber ensemble, percussion.	A. Sallinen & L. Nummi (lyricists)	Text from the Bible, using the official translation by the Finnish Bible Translation Committee; sung in Finnish; commission from the Naantali Music Festival; Sallinen remarks on the work's genre, "Is Barabbas Dialogues a song cycle, a chamber oratorio, a cantata, a piece of musical theater or something else? I haven't troubled my head with this question. In the best of circumstances, a work of art creates its own world."
23 mins.	The Windy Winter in Provence (N) (fi: Tuulinen talvi Provencessa): 1) Hän ei tiedä tästä surusta; 2) Interlude I; 3) On suru siitä mitä katosi; 4) Interlude II; 5) Rukoilen harhailevan sielusi puolesta; 6) Interlude III; 7) Annan ääneni soittimille; 8) Berceuse	Chamber & voice	89	2006	Song cycle (5 numbers, 3 interludes) Tenor (or soprano), pf, vl, guitar	P. Haavikko (lyricist)	Subtitled A Requiem after the Death of a Close Person (Eli requiem läheisen kuoltua); sung in Finnish; interludes are for violin and guitar and can be omitted (see Op. 89a)
12 mins.	The Windy Winter in Provence (N) (fi: Tuulinen talvi Provencessa): 1) Hän ei tiedä tästä surusta; 2) On suru siitä mitä katosi; 3) Rukoilen harhailevan sielusi puolesta; 4) Annan ääneni soittimille; 5) Berceuse	Chamber & voice	89a	2006	Song cycle (5 numbers) Tenor (or soprano), pf	P. Haavikko (lyricist)	Subtitled A Requiem after the Death of a Close Person (Eli requiem läheisen kuoltua); sung in Finnish; in this version, the three interludes are for violin and guitar are omitted (see Op. 89)
12 mins.	Behold the North Sky (N) (fi: Katso pohjoista taivasta): 1) Kalliopohja (Rocky Ground); 2) Katso pohjoista taivasta (Behold the north sky); 3) Ja tuulen mahtava laulu (And the awesome song of the wind)	Chamber & voice	109	2017	Song cycle (3 numbers) Soloists, pf	H. Juvonen (lyricist)	Sung in Finnish
9 mins.	Songs from the Sea (N) (fi: Lauluja mereltä): 1) Sea Prayer; 2) Shipshape; 3) Sea Danger; 4) Ballad	Chorus a cappella	33	1974	Song cycle (4 numbers) Children's choir	Various sources	Sung in Finnish; text for Nos. 1–2 from poems by Sallinen's sons; text for No. 3 from Laulupuu & for No. 4 from the Kanteletar; No. 4 features a child soloist
6 mins.	The Beaufort Scale (N)	Chorus a cappella	56	1984	Song Mixed choir	A. Sallinen (lyricist)	Humoresque sung in English and based on the wind velocity scale
5 mins.	Hold Fast Your Dreams (N)	Chorus a cappella	73	1996	Song Children's (or mixed) choir	L. Driscoll (lyricist)	Sung in English; commission from the Northern Encounters Festival, Toronto
8 mins.	Song Around a Song (N): 1) Italiano; 2) Sakura; 3) Tein minä pillin pajupuusta (I made a pile of wickerwood); 4) Joshua fought the Battle of Jerico	Chorus a cappella	50	1980	Song cycle (4 numbers) Children's choir	Various sources	No. 1 sung in Italian; No. 2 sung in Japanese; No. 3 sung in Finnish; No. 4 sung in English
11 mins.	The Birth of Ale (N) (fi: Oluen synty)	Chorus a cappella	77	1999	Cantata Mixed choir	? ? (lyricist)	Sung in Finnish; commission from the Suomen Laulu in celebration of its 100th anniversary

== Notes, references, and sources ==
=== Sources ===
CD liner notes

- Anderson, Martin (2003). Aulis Sallinen: Symphonies 1 & 7 (booklet). Ari Rasilainen & Deutsche Staatsphilharmonie Rheinland-Pfalz. Germany: CPO. p. 13–16. CPO 999918-2.
- Anderson, Martin (2005a). Aulis Sallinen: Symphonies 2 & 4; Horn Concerto; Mauermusik (booklet). Ari Rasilainen & Norrköping Symphony Orchestra. Germany: CPO. p. 10–13. CPO 999969-2.
- Anderson, Martin (2005b). Aulis Sallinen: Symphony 8; Violin Concerto (booklet). Ari Rasilainen & Deutsche Staatsphilharmonie Rheinland-Pfalz. Germany: CPO. p. 13–16. CPO 999972-2.
- Anderson, Martin (2006). Aulis Sallinen: Chamber Musics III, IV, V (booklet). Arto Noras; Mika Väyrynen & Virtuosi di Kuhmo; Ralf Gothóni. Germany: CPO. p. 11–14. CPO 777147-2.
- Anderson, Martin (2008). Aulis Sallinen: Symphonies 3 & 5 (booklet). Ari Rasilainen & Deutsche Staatsphilharmonie Rheinland-Pfalz. Germany: CPO. p. 11–14. CPO 999970-2.
- Anderson, Martin (2009). Aulis Sallinen: Symphony 6; Cello Concerto (booklet). Ari Rasilainen & Norrrköping Symphony Orchestra. Germany: CPO. p. 11–14. CPO 999971-2.
- Anderson, Martin (2014). Aulis Sallinen: Chamber Music (booklet). Elina Vähälä; Arto Noras; Ralf Gothóni. Germany: CPO. p. 13–16. CPO 777814-2.
- Hako, Pekka (English translation: William Moore) (1992). Aulis Sallinen: Kullervo, Opera in Two Acts (booklet). Ulf Söderblom & Finnish National Opera Orchestra & Chorus. Helsinki: Ondine. p. 12–14. ODE 1258-2T.
- Hako, Pekka (English translation: Jaakko Mäntyjärvi) (2006). Aulis Sallinen: The King Goes Forth to France, Opera in Three Acts (booklet). Okko Kamu & Helsinki Philharmonic Orchestra. Helsinki: Ondine. p. 9–11. ODE 1066-2D.
- Hermans, Ralf (1996). Aulis Sallinen: Complete Works for String Orchestra (booklet). Okko Kamu & Finnish Chamber Orchestra. Naxos. p. 2–4. 8.553747.
- Hermans, Ralf (English translation: Jaakko Mäntyjärvi & Diana Tullberg) (1998). Aulis Sallinen: Complete Works for Violin, Cello, Double Bass and Piano (booklet). Jaakko Kuusisto, Mats Rondin, Saara Hakkila, & Ilkka Paananen. Naxos. p. 2–3. 8.553759.
- Kaipainen, Jouni (English translation: Jaakko Mäntyjärvi) (2015). Aulis Sallinen: Chamber Music I–VIII (booklet). Arto Noras, Alexis Roman, Meta4, Ville Matvegeff, Jyväskylä Sinfonia & Wind Quintet, & Ralf Gothóni. Helsinki: Ondine. p. 4–12. ODE 1256-2D.
- Kamu, Okko (English translation: William Jewson) (1987). Aulis Sallinen: Sinfonia — Chorali — Sinfonia III (booklet). Okko Kamu & Finnish Radio Symphony Orchestra. Hamburg, Germany: BIS. BIS CD-41.
- Marklund, Kenneth (English translation: Timothy Binham) (1995). Aulis Sallinen: Songs of Life and Death; The Iron Age Suite (booklet). Okko Kamu, Helsinki Philharmonic Orchestra, Jorma Hynninen, & Opera Festival Chorus. Helsinki: Ondine. p. 5–9. ODE 844-2.
- Sallinen, Aulis (2003). Composer's Preface (booklet). Ari Rasilainen & Deutsche Staatsphilharmonie Rheinland-Pfalz. Germany: CPO. p. 11–12. CPO 999918-2.
- Weitzman, Ronald (1991). Aulis Sallinen: Sunrise Serenade; Symphony No. 2; Symphony No. 6 ('From a New Zealand Diary') (booklet). Okko Kamu & Malmö Symphony Orchestra. Hamburg, Germany: BIS. p. 3–6. BIS CD-511.
- Weitzman, Ronald (1993). Aulis Sallinen: Symphony No. 4, Op. 49; Shadows, Op. 52; Symphony No. 5, 'Washington Mosaics', Op. 57 (booklet). James DePreist & Malmö Symphony Orchestra. Hamburg, Germany: BIS. p. 3–4. BIS CD-607.
