= Symphonies (Sallinen) =

Musical work composed by Aulis Sallinen

The Finnish composer Aulis Sallinen has composed eight symphonies, considered by some to be the core of his instrumental output.

== Symphony No. 1, Op. 24 ==
Originally entitled just 'Sinfonia', Sallinen's first symphony lasts around 16 minutes. It won first prize in a competition organized by the City of Helsinki to mark the inauguration of Finlandia House, and was premièred there in December 1971 by the Helsinki City Symphony Orchestra conducted by Jorma Panula. This single movement symphony is a dense atmospheric piece arising from an environment of F sharp minor. Okko Kamu notes that the symphonic texture is founded on organic expansion of motifs; the work emerges from small intervals. He comments that "the scherzo movement... rushes forward like a tempest... The exquisite section with percussion and harp is peculiarly fascinating with timbres of sound and an exoticism, the intensity of which emanates from an escaping triad".

== Symphony No. 2, Op. 29 'Symphonic Dialogue for percussion and orchestra' ==
The second symphony was written soon after the first and lasts around 17 minutes. It was commissioned by and first performed by the Norrköping Symphony Orchestra, conducted by Okko Kamu in February 1973, with percussionist Rainer Kuisma. A studio recording was made by the BBC Scottish Symphony Orchestra under Ole Schmidt in February 1981. The work is based principally on two themes, a falling scale, and a fanfare-like motif; the percussion part, well-integrated into the symphony as a whole demands use of marimba, vibraphone, crotales, tom-tom, bongo, military snare drum, suspended cymbal, guiro and tam-tam.

== Symphony No. 3, Op. 35 ==
Sallinen's third symphony was commissioned by the Finnish Broadcasting Company and dedicated to Okko Kamu, who conducted the première with the Finnish Radio Symphony Orchestra in April 1975. The work lasts around 27 minutes. The symphony was finished at around the time of his first opera Ratsumies (The Horseman), and was the first to be divided into several movements. The middle movement takes the form of a chaconne based on themes of the first movement coda. The last movement recreates the atmosphere of the first, where "the sea builds up into an engulfing orchestral wave pouring over the landscape". In March 1984 a ballet entitled Midsomernatten with choreography by Thor Sutowski and based on this symphony was first performed at the Atlanta Civic Center. Kamu reflects that, conceived on an island out in the Baltic, it embodies the composer's love of the ocean “that fickle element which without warning changes character”.

== Symphony No. 4, Op. 49 ==
This symphony was a commission from the city of Turku to celebrate its 750th anniversary. Lasting 22 minutes, and in less sombre mode than its predecessors, it was first played by the Turku City Symphony Orchestra conducted by Pertti Pekkanen in August 1979. The UK première was given by the Hallé Orchestra conducted by Okko Kamu in the Free Trade Hall in October 1980. Composed shortly after his Dies Irae for voices and orchestra (1978) which was influenced by thoughts of nuclear devastation, the symphony maintains a sense of fear: a striking opening march interweaves with quiet, bleak passages, while the sound of bells overlies the last movement. Especially in the first movement of this symphony Sallinen begins to develop a ‘mosaic technique’, which he would make a central part of his approach to the fifth symphony.

== Symphony No. 5, Op. 57 'Washington Mosaics' ==
Sallinen's fifth symphony was a commission from the National Symphony Orchestra Association (USA). It received its première at the Kennedy Center in October 1985 with the National Symphony Orchestra conducted by Mstislav Rostropovich. The work lasts 37 minutes. The UK première was given by the London Philharmonic Orchestra under Kamu in the Royal Festival Hall in February 1987. Sallinen has commented that “whereas each movement in a symphony usually has its own material, here certain motifs are repeated identically, just like identical pieces in a mosaic, in the various movements”. This five-movement work ranges in expression “from static frozen cluster chords to almost tonal allusions to Sibelius and Mahler”.

== Symphony No. 6, Op. 65 'From a New Zealand Diary' ==
In order to prepare for the commission from the New Zealand Symphony Orchestra, Sallinen had a holiday in New Zealand in early 1989. The titles of the movements are I. The Islands of the Sounds. The sounds of the islands (attacca) II. Air. Rain. III. Kyeburn Diggings (attacca) IV. Finale 'Simply by sailing in a new direction You could enlarge the world' (a line from a poem by Allen Curnow). The 2nd movement quotes from Act II of The King Goes Forth to France, and the whole work lasts approximately 42 minutes.

== Symphony No. 7, Op. 71 'The Dreams of Gandalf' ==
The music was intended for a ballet around the subject of the Hobbit, which was abandoned due to copyright difficulties, but much of the material was made into this 25-minute seventh symphony (the subtitle refers to Gandalf, a character of JRR Tolkien; indeed, the five-note theme woven throughout the symphony spells out G-A-D-A-F). The first performance by the Göteborg Symphony Orchestra was conducted by Neeme Järvi. A ballet Holbitti (also called The Dragon Mountain (The Hobbit), Op.78) (choreographed by Marjo Kuusela) was produced at the Finnish National Opera in 2001 using this symphony and other music by Sallinen. A note in the score states “The symphony does not actually depict the events in the novel; rather it is a musical expression of the literary atmosphere and poetry”.

== Symphony No. 8 Autumnal Fragments, Op. 81 (2001) ==
Written in 2001, the symphony lasts 24 minutes in its world première recording. Commissioned by the Royal Concertgebouw Orchestra it received its world première by the same orchestra conducted by Paavo Järvi on 16 April 2004. In the words of the composer « I have quoted "Theme of the Dead" from my opera Kullervo, and it finally emerges as a five-part canon. The "Bell Theme" of the finale is a salute to the Royal Concertgebouw Orchestra... built up from certain notes from the name and its home city: ConCErtGEBouwAmstErDAm. The autumnal of the subtitle refers to the composer's time of life.

Music from Symphonies 1, 3 and 4 was used for a ballet, based on a play, Himlens hemlighet (Secret of Heaven) by Pär Lagerkvist, choreographed by Pär Isberg, and shown on Swedish television on 20 October 1986.
