= Op. 115 =

In music, Op. 115 stands for Opus number 115. Compositions that are assigned this number include:

- Arnold – Clarinet Concerto No. 2
- Beethoven – Zur Namensfeier
- Brahms – Clarinet Quintet
- Dvořák – Armida (Dvořák)
- Fauré – Piano Quintet No. 2
- Prokofiev – Sonata for Solo Violin
- Ries – Piano Concerto No. 4
- Sallinen – Concerto for Two Accordions, Strings and Percussion
- Schumann – Overture and incidental music, Manfred
