= Shadows (Sallinen) =

Composition by Aulis Sallinen

- Orchestral prelude by Aulis Sallinen
- Opus: 52
- Composed: 1982
- Duration: Approx. 10 minutes
- Movements: 1

Premiere
- Date: 30 November 1982
- Location: Kennedy Center, Washington, D.C., United States
- Conductor: Mstislav Rostropovich
- Performers: National Symphony Orchestra

Shadows, Op. 52, is an orchestral prelude by the Finnish composer Aulis Sallinen, who wrote the piece in 1982 on commission from the National Symphony Orchestra Association. The prelude's thematic material is closely related to Act III of Sallinen's third opera, The King Goes Forth to France, on which he also was at work in 1982, writing Shadows upon completion of Act II of the opera. Nevertheless, the composer has emphasized that Shadows is "an entirely independent orchestral work", albeit one whose "lyrical and dramatic ingredients reflect the philosophy of the opera". The National Symphony Orchestra (NSO) premiered the work on 30 November 1982 at the Kennedy Center in Washington, D.C., under the direction of its music director, Mstislav Rostropovich. Shadows so impressed Rostropovich and his orchestra that the NSO requested Sallinen compose a symphony for them, the result of which would be the Fifth (1985).

== Composition ==
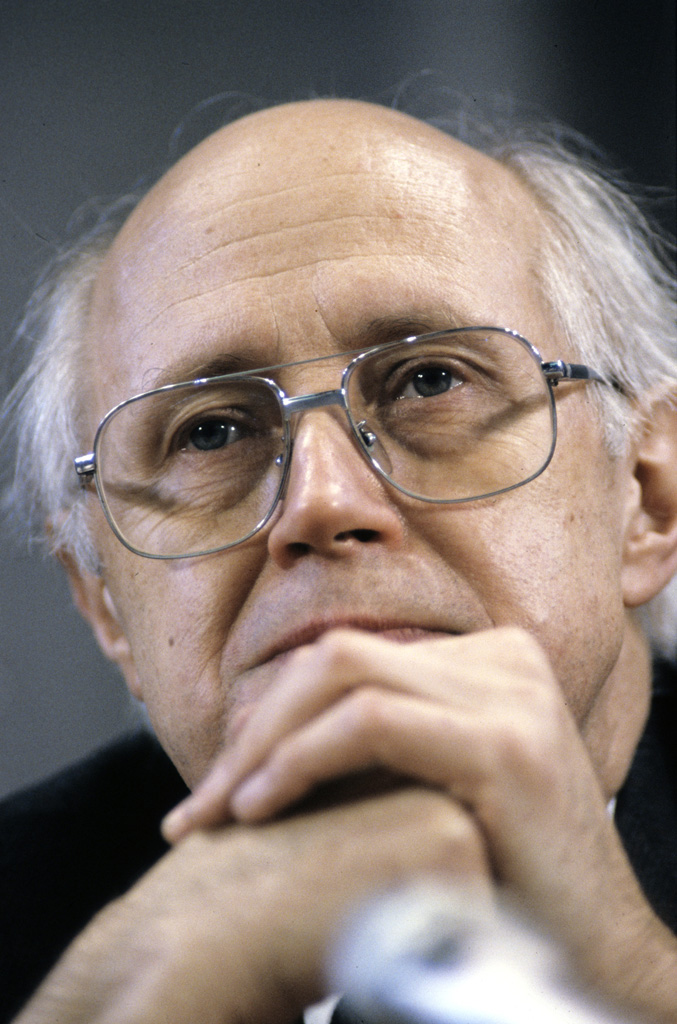
Mstislav Rostropovich, who conducted the world premiere of Sallinen's Shadows

According to the publisher, Novello & Co, Shadows is scored for the following:

- Woodwind: 3 flutes (1 doubling piccolo), 3 oboes, 3 clarinets in B♭ (1 doubling B♭ bass clarinet), 3 bassoons (1 doubling contrabassoon)
- Brass: 4 horns in F, 3 trumpets in B♭, 3 trombones
- Percussion: timpani, 4 percussionists (bass drum, snare drum, tenor drum, tam-tam, cymbals, suspended cymbal, triangle, glockenspiel, vibraphone, tubular bells)
- Strings: violins, violas, cellos, double basses, harp, piano

== Reception ==
=== Notable performances ===
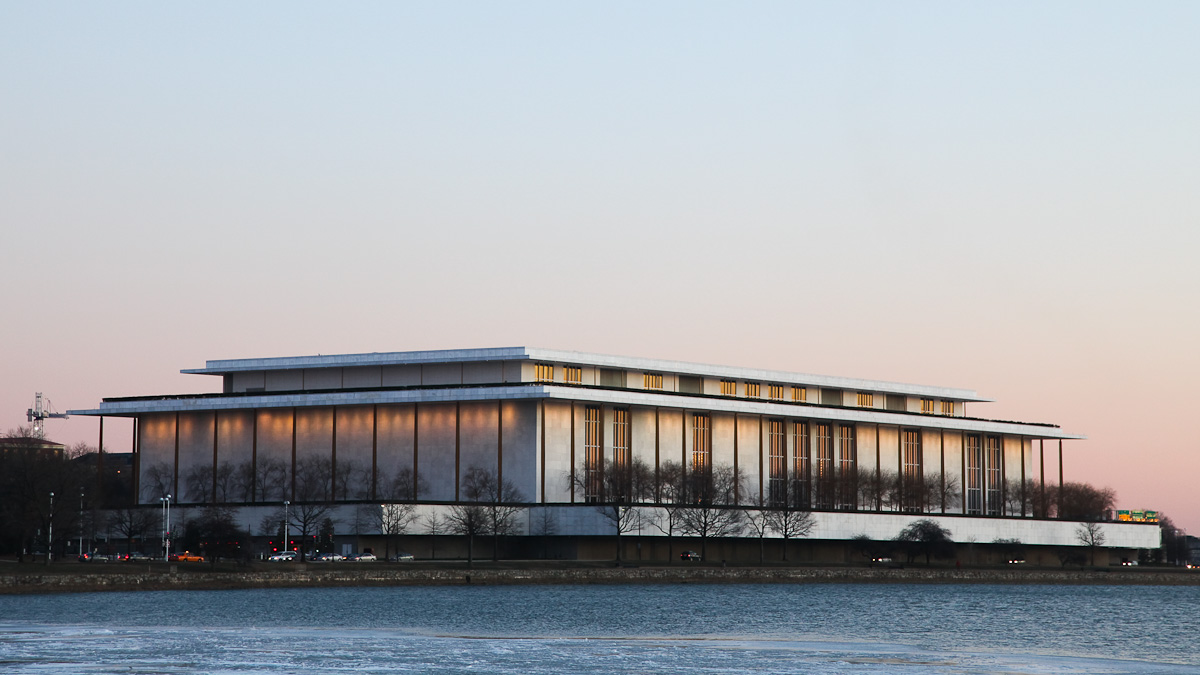
The John F. Kennedy Center for the Performing Arts, at which the NSO premiered Sallinen's orchestral prelude

As part of the 'Scandinavia Today Exposition' in Washington, D.C., Shadows had its world premiere on 30 November 1982, with Mstislav Rostropovich conducting the National Symphony Orchestra (NSO) at the Kennedy Center; also on the program was Sibelius's Violin Concerto in D minor, Berwald's Sinfonie naïve, and Rosenberg's orchestral suite, Voyage to America. Reporting on the concert, The Washington Post wrote that Sallinen's orchestral prelude had "had a powerful impact on its first performance", noting in particular its kinship with the Sibelius concerto, due to its "having a similar prevailing darkness of tone and a strong sense of dramatic contrasts". A day later, on 1 December, Rostropovich and his orchestra gave Shadows and the Sibelius concerto at Carnegie Hall in New York, but this time paired with Nielsen's Sinfonia espansiva and Nordal's Choralis. In its review, The New York Times found the Sallinen "heavy and sober" in mood and "eclectic" in style, concluding "the shadows evoked by the piece were definitely of the darker sort". Shadows is also the only work by Sallinen's to have been performed at the BBC Proms, in Prom 13, August 1983.

=== Recordings ===
To date, Shadows has received three recordings, the first of which is from 1984 with Okko Kamu conducting the Helsinki Philharmonic on the Finlandia label. Finnish conductor Ari Rasilainen has also recorded the prelude (an interpretation that is notably quicker than those of his predecessors) as part of cpo's compendium of Sallinen's orchestral works. Shadows joins the Eighth Symphony (Op. 81, 2001), the Violin Concerto (Op. 18, 1968), and The Palace Rhapsody (Op. 72, 1995) on the second volume of the cpo series.

Conductor	Orchestra	Year	Recording venue	Duration	Label (Available on)
Okko Kamu	Helsinki Philharmonic Orchestra	1984	Kulttuuritalo (Helsinki)	9:57	Finlandia (346)
James DePreist	Malmö Symphony Orchestra	1993	Malmö Concert Hall (Malmö)	9:48	BIS (607)
Ari Rasilainen	Staatsphilharmonie Rheinland-Pfalz	2004	Philharmonie (Ludwigshafen)	8:48	cpo (999972-2)

== Notes, references, and sources ==
=== Sources ===
Books

- Howell, Tim (2006). After Sibelius: Studies in Finnish Music. Routledge. ISBN 978-075-4651-77-2.
- Korhonen, Kimmo (2007). Inventing Finnish Music: Contemporary Composers from Medieval to Modern. Finnish Music Information Center (FIMIC). ISBN 978-952-5076-61-5.

CD liner notes

- Anderson, Martin (2005). Aulis Sallinen: Symphony 8; Violin Concerto (booklet). Ari Rasilainen & Deutsche Staatsphilharmonie Rheinland-Pfalz. Germany: CPO. p. 13–14. CPO 999972-2.
- Weitzman, Ronald (1993). Aulis Sallinen: Symphony No. 4, Op. 49; Shadows, Op. 52; Symphony No. 5, 'Washington Mosaics', Op. 57 (booklet). James DePreist & Malmö Symphony Orchestra. Hamburg, Germany: BIS. p. 4–5. BIS CD-607.

Journal articles

- Brenesal, Barry (2005). "Sallinen: 'Shadows'; Symphony No. 8; 'The Palace Rhapsody'; Violin Concerto". Fanfare. 29 (1). Tenafly, NJ: Fanfare, Inc.: 264. (subscription required)
- De Jong, Diederik (1995). "Guide to Records — Sallinen's Symphonies 4 and 5 and Shadows by the Malmo Symphony under James DePreist". American Record Guide. 58 (1). Washington, DC: Record Guide Publications: 166. (subscription required)

News reports

- Adamo, Mark (1992-12-04). "National Symphony Orchestra". Style. The Washington Post. Washington, DC. p. D1.
- Henahan, Donal (1982-12-02). "Symphony National Orchestra". Section C, Cultural Desk. The New York Times. New York, NY. p. 30.
- McLellan, Joseph (1982-12-01). "NSO's Night of Contrasts". Style. The Washington Post. Washington, DC. p. C10.
