= Ilmari Kianto =

Finnish writer

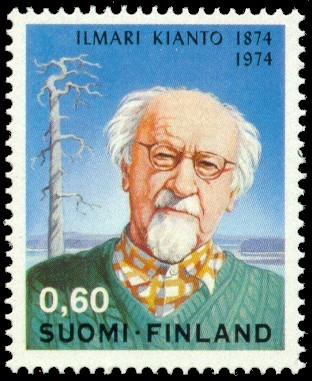
Ilmari Kianto portrayed on a postage stamp published in 1974.

Ilmari Kianto (7 May 1874 – 27 April 1970), also known as Ilmari Calamnius and Ilmari Iki-Kianto, was a Finnish author. He was born in Pulkkila, Northern Ostrobothnia, and is best known for his books Punainen viiva ("The Red Line", published 1909) and Ryysyrannan Jooseppi (published in 1924). In his books, he describes people and living at Suomussalmi municipality in Kainuu region. He was also a Karelian irredenitist and an anti-communist. He died in Helsinki, aged 95. Composer Jean Sibelius used Kianto's poem 'Lastu lainehilla' (Driftwood) as the lyric for the last of his Seven Songs, Op.17 (1902).

Kianto's books have also been adapted into films, most notably the 1955 film Joseph of Ryysyranta directed by Roland af Hällström and the 1959 film The Red Line directed by Matti Kassila. In the year 1978 composer Aulis Sallinen made a libretto based on Kianto's novel and composed an opera The Red Line.
