= Symphony No. 8 (Sallinen) =

Symphony in one movement by Aulis Sallinen

The Symphony No. 8 Autumnal Fragments, Op. 81, is the eighth symphony by the Finnish composer Aulis Sallinen. The work was commissioned by the Royal Concertgebouw Orchestra and was completed in October 2001. Its world premiere was given by the Royal Concertgebouw Orchestra conducted by Paavo Järvi at the Concertgebouw on April 16, 2004.

== Background ==
The symphony is cast in one continuous movement and has a duration of approximately 20 minutes. Sallinen described its composition in the score program notes, remarking, "I have sought to combine two contrasting elements in this work: one that is fragmentary and sketchy, and one that maintains a symphonic discipline and coherence." He continued:

Whenever I have had the chance, I have always enjoyed being in an artist's studio, looking at sketches. The fascination of a sketch lies in the fact that it conveys a strong, quickly realised inspiration and vision, at the same time leaving scope for many possible alterations and developments. All paths to completion are open, no possibilities have been excluded, and so the sketch is the foundation of a multi-faceted whole.

The music quotes the "Theme of the Dead" from Sallinen's 1992 opera Kullervo. Additionally, the "Bell Theme" of the symphony's finale is a homage to the Royal Concertgebouw Orchestra; this theme consists of the possible musical notes contained in the words "Concertgebouw Amsterdam," or CCEGEBAEDA.

The composition of the symphony was influenced by the September 11 attacks, which occurred late in the writing process. Sallinen wrote, "The title Autumnal Fragments refers not only to the age of the composer, but also the tragic events of September 11. That is why the finale turned out to be different from my original design."

== Instrumentation ==
The work is scored for a large orchestra consisting of four flutes (3rd and 4th doubling piccolo), three oboes, three clarinets (4th doubling bass clarinet), three bassoons (3rd doubling contrabassoon), four horns, three trumpets, three trombones, tuba, timpani, four percussionists, harp, and strings.

== Reception ==
The symphony has been praised by music critics. Reviewing a 2005 performance by the Cincinnati Symphony Orchestra at Carnegie Hall, Anthony Tommasini of The New York Times described the piece as "like a string of boldly disconnected rhythmic riffs, melodic motives and aborted attempts at development." Tommasini further remarked:

It begins with a nonchalant rhythmic pattern for wood blocks, as if the percussionist is trying to get the piece going. Soon, strangely haunting things happen: whistling figurations from the violins, minimalistic repetitions in the lower strings, pungent brass chorales that suddenly stop. A middle section, like a nervous scherzo, gains in impetus and density. But the work subsides into a slow, funereal ending, the composer's response, as he has written, to the horrors of 9/11. If the fragments never quite coalesce into a whole, Mr. Sallinen takes you on a journey so wondrous you are sorry when it ends.

Guy Rickards of Gramophone said the title "seems at odds with the music's unbroken flow and much of the work's dynamic arises from this tension between static and moving elements, encapsulated right at the start, dominated by the percussion." He added, "The process of integrating these irreconcilable elements has a kinship with that in Sallinen's Fifth, Washington Mosaics, but the Eighth's structure is more obviously integrated and quietly compelling."
