= Chamber Music III (Sallinen) =

Concertante work by Aulis Sallinen

- The Nocturnal Dances of Don Juanquixote
- by Aulis Sallinen
- Opus: 58
- Composed: 1985–86
- Duration: Approx. 20 minutes
- Movements: 1

Premiere
- Date: 15 June 1986
- Location: Naantali Church, Naantali, Finland
- Conductor: Vladimir Ashkenazy
- Performers: Arto Noras (cello soloist), English Chamber Orchestra

The Chamber Music III, The Nocturnal Dances of Don Juanquixote (sometimes Juanquijote or Juan Quixote; in Finnish: Kamarimusiikki III, Don Juanquijoten yölliset tanssit), Op. 58, is a concertante composition for cello and string orchestra by the Finnish composer Aulis Sallinen, who wrote the piece from 1985 to 1986 on commission of the Naantali Music Festival. The piece was first performed by cellist Arto Noras (the dedicatee) on 15 June 1986 in Naantali, Finland, with Vladimir Ashkenazy conducting the English Chamber Orchestra. The pseudo-literary title—a compound of iconic, fictional characters Don Juan (the libertine and seducer) and Don Quixote (the bumbling knight-errant)—recalls, but does not quote, the Op. 20 and Op. 35 tone poems of Richard Strauss, respectively. The piece is the most popular and recorded of Sallinen's series of nine (as of 2018) Chamber Musics.

== Instrumentation ==
According to the publisher, Novello & Co, Chamber Music III is scored for the following (Note: numbers are minimums):

- Soloist: cello
- Strings: 7 violins (4 first and 3 second), 2 violas (divided), 2 cellos (divided), and 1 double bass

== Recordings ==
To date, four cellists have recorded Chamber Music III across six recordings. Arto Noras, the dedicatee, accounts for half of these performances, including the piece's premiere recording, which is from 1988 with Okko Kamu conducting the Finlandia Sinfonietta on the Finlandia label; as well as its most recent, in 2014, for Ondine's complete recording of the Sallinen Chamber Musics. A notable detractor of Nocturnal Dances, however, is the American Record Guide's Tom Lehman, who terms the piece a "monstrosity" in his review of the Turovsky recording: "This 20-minute string of disjointed, pretentious, saprophagous, smirking postmodern allusions and distortions (of 'pop' cliches as well as 'classical' music)," he continues, "Is simply awful. Horrendous. Hideous. Ghastly."

Conductor	Orchestra	Cellist	Year	Recording venue	Duration	Label (Available on)
Okko Kamu	Finlandia Sinfonietta	Arto Noras	1988	Järvenpää Hall (Järvenpää)	19:10	Finlandia (370)
Osmo Vänskä	Tapiola Sinfonietta	Torleif Thedéen	1992	Tapiola Hall (Espoo)	20:21	BIS (560)
Okko Kamu	Finnish Chamber Orchestra	Mats Rondin	1995	Tapiola Hall (Espoo)	19:25	Naxos (8.553747)
Yuli Turovsky	I Musici de Montréal	Yuli Turovsky	2001	Church of La Nativité de la Sainte-Vierge (La Prairie)	20:01	Chandos (9973)
Ralf Gothóni	Virtuosi di Kuhmo	Arto Noras	2005	Järvenpää Hall (Järvenpää)	20:06	cpo (777147-2)
Ville Matvejeff	Sinfonia Finlandia Jyväskylä	Arto Noras	2014	Hannikaissali (Jyväskylä)	19:30	Ondine (1256-20)

== Notes, references, and sources ==
=== Sources ===
Books

- Korhonen, Kimmo (2007). Inventing Finnish Music: Contemporary Composers from Medieval to Modern. Finnish Music Information Center (FIMIC). ISBN 978-952-5076-61-5.

CD liner notes

- Hermans, Ralf (1996). Sallinen: Complete Works for String Orchestra (booklet). Okko Kamu & Finnish Chamber Orchestra. Germany: Naxos. p. 2–4. 8.553747.
- Kaipainen, Jouni (2015). Aulis Sallinen: Chamber Music I–VIII (booklet). Ville Matvejeff & Sinfonia Finlandia Jyväskylä. Germany: Ondine. p. 4–12. ODE1256-2D.

Journal articles

- De Jong, Diederik (1997). "Sallinen: Some Aspects of Hintrik's Funeral March; Chamber Music I+II+III; Sunrise Serenade". The American Record Guide. 60 (4): 162–63. (subscription required)
- Gimbell, Allen (2015). "SALLINEN: Chamber Music 1-8; Sunrise Serenade". The American Record Guide. 78 (6): 144. (subscription required)
- Lehman, Mark (2002). "The Modern Cello: Nocturnal Dances of Don Juan Quixote". The American Record Guide. 65 (5): 199. (subscription required)
- Scott, Phillip (2009). "Classical Recordings—Sallinen". Fanfare. 32 (5): 227–29. (subscription required)
- Wierzbicki, James (1990). "Recordings in Review: Sallinen". Musical America. 110 (6): 84–85. (subscription required)
