= The Red Line =

Opera in two acts by Aulis Sallinen

The Red Line Punainen viiva
- Opera by Aulis Sallinen
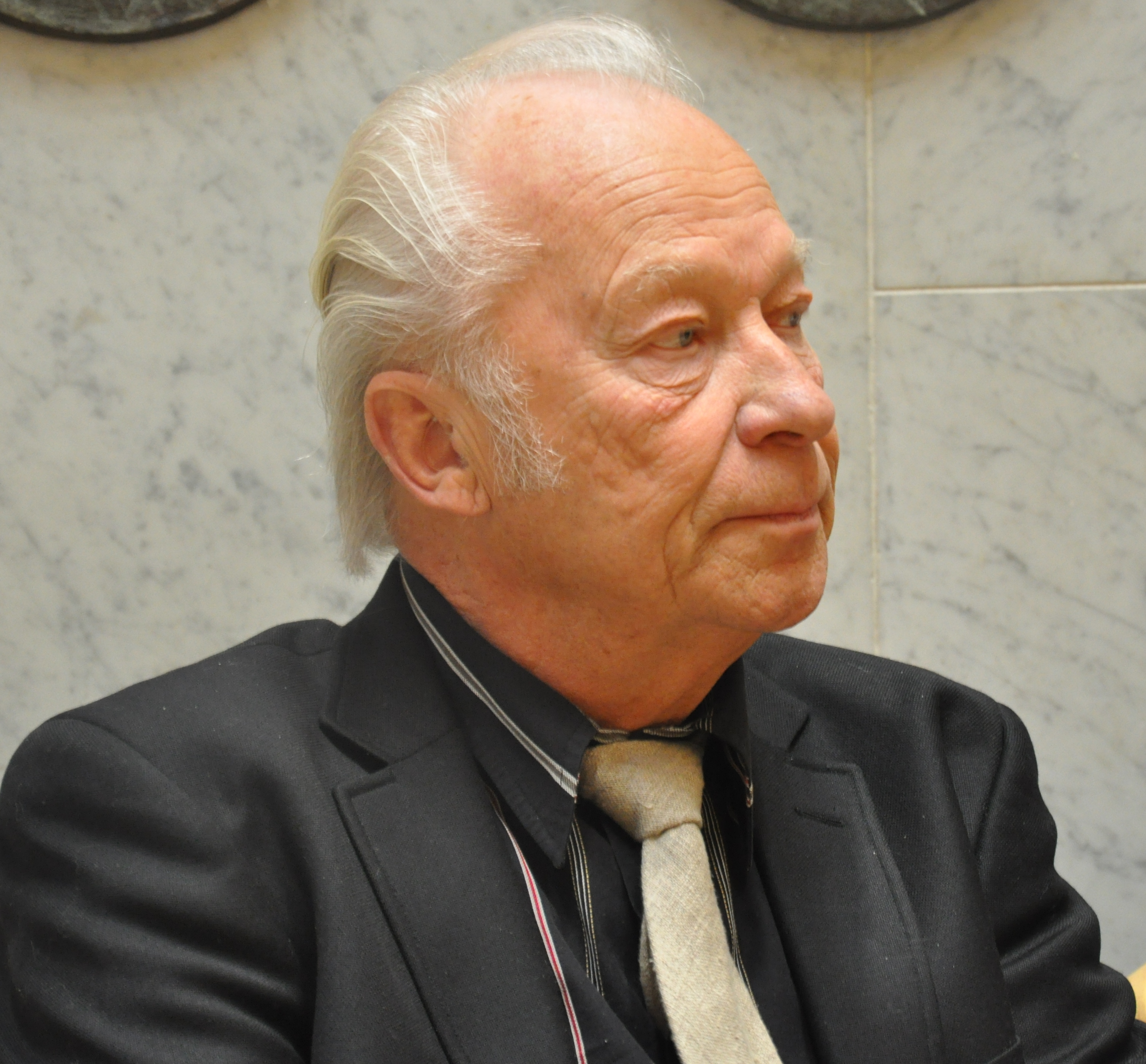
- Aulis Sallinen in 2009
- Librettist: Sallinen
- Language: Finnish
- Based on: Punainen viiva by Ilmari Kianto
- Premiere: 30 November 1978; Finnish National Opera, Helsinki

The Red Line (Punainen viiva) is an opera in two acts with music by Aulis Sallinen to a libretto by the composer, which was premièred on 30 November 1978 at the Finnish National Opera.

Based on the 1909 novel Punainen viiva by Ilmari Kianto (1874–1970), the opera – like the novel – is set in 1907, a watershed year in Finnish history during which its first elections were held, leading eventually to Finnish independence in 1917.

== Performance history ==
Outside Finland, the opera was performed at several European opera houses, including Sadler's Wells Theatre, London in June 1979, Göteborg and Stockholm in 1980, Zürich in 1981, Moscow, Leningrad and Tallinn in 1982, and in Osnabrück and Dortmund in May 1985, as well as at the Metropolitan Opera of New York in 1983. It has been revived several times in Helsinki and was recorded in November 1979 by Finlandia. A DVD of Finnish National Opera's 2007 stage production conducted by Mikko Franck has been issued by Ondine. The English translation (1980) was by composer Stephen Oliver (who would later translate of The King goes forth to France and Kullervo).

== Roles ==
Role	Voice type	Premiere Cast, 30 November 1978, (Conductor: Okko Kamu)
Topi, a crofter	baritone	Jorma Hynninen
Riika, his wife	soprano	Taru Valjakka
Puntarpää, an agitator	tenor	Usko Viitanen
Simana Arhippaini, a pedlar	bass	Hannu Malin
Young Priest	bass-baritone	Erkki Aalto
Kaisa, neighbour	alto	Ulla Maijala
Jussi, neighbour	bass	Harri Nikkonen
Tiina, neighbour	soprano	Helena Salonius
Vicar	tenor	Antti Salmén
Raappana, a cobbler	spoken	Harri Tirkkonen
Kunilla, his wife	spoken	Iris-Lilja Lassila
Epra	bass	Kauko Väyrynen
Neighbours, villagers, children

== Synopsis ==
North Finnish province of Kainuu; the croft of Topi and his family

=== Act 1 ===
Scene 1
It is late autumn; a bear, symbol of the threat of brutal nature, is heard nearby; it has carried off one of their sheep. As Topi promises to slay the bear, he argues with his wife, both feel trapped by their poor life and realise that they have barely any food remaining for the family. Topi believes that things will change for the better.

Scene 2
Topi dreams that he has gone to the village to ask for help for children, but, admonished by the vicar for not attending church, aid arrives too late and his children are dead. Topi awakes, terrified by his dream, but takes some birds to exchange for grain and sets off to the village. Riika regrets having called Topi names.

Scene 3
A pedlar enters, Simana Arhippaini from Karelia, tells the children riddles and sings a ballad, but cannot answer their serious questions. Topi returns and gets Kunilla to read to him from a socialist newspaper, and talks about ‘an election’, a possible way of release from their toil and poverty without understanding the importance of it.

Scene 4, New Year
An agitator addresses an open-air meeting. Despite interruptions from a young priest, he proclaims social democracy and tells of freedom, equality and fraternity. The people are slowly aware of the meaning of the vote.

=== Act 2 ===
Scene 5, Twelfth Night
Neighbours join Topi and Riika to celebrate Twelfth Night. Riika reads from a socialist tract; all will be voting in the election but Topi, having only ever held axes and spades in his hands, wonders how he will make his mark — a red line — on the ballot paper. As they are discussing the future, dogs start barking, aware that the bear is turning in his sleep, but the people can't sense this.

Scene 6, Fifteenth of March
Outside the polling-booth a confrontation takes place between the young priest and his choir, and the socialist organiser and his group. The voters are checked as they enter to vote. Topi and Riika go in.

Scene 7, later in the spring
Topi is at the logging camp; Riika anxiously clears fresh tracks in the snow for him every day, hoping for his return. She desperately longs for word that the election has changed their lives; but no one comes. The children have all fallen ill from malnutrition. Kaisi tells Riika it is a punishment; when Topi returns they have all died. The vicar agrees to bury them for a reduced price, as they can all fit in a single coffin.

Epilogue
The message comes that the election has been won by the ordinary people. There is the promise of better clothes, food and health, but it is too late for Topi and Riika. Then dogs bark, warning of the bear, which has awakened. Topi goes to fight it, but he is killed and Riika finds him dead, and cries out in horror over his corpse, with blood pouring out of his throat, in a red line.

== The music ==
Grove notes the careful structuring of mood via the music with lyricism in the opening scenes, pastiche folk music where needed and a choral confrontation between the old (folk melody) and the new (revolutionary fervour). Bush describes the music as "expertly composed and elegantly orchestrated", and commends scenes 4 and 6, and the orchestral interludes. Another writer commented that in this "grim opera" the very intense dramatic effect of the music may be due to its generally low-key approach.

== See also ==
- Red Line (1959 film), a film adaptation of the novel by Ilmari Kianto
