= Symphony No. 4 (Sallinen) =

Symphony in three movements by Aulis Sallinen

- by Aulis Sallinen
- Opus: 49
- Composed: 1978–79
- Duration: Approx. 23 minutes
- Movements: 3

Premiere
- Date: 9 August 1979
- Location: Turku, Finland
- Conductor: Pertti Pekkanen
- Performers: Turku Philharmonic Orchestra

The Symphony No. 4, Op. 49, is an orchestral composition by the Finnish composer Aulis Sallinen, who wrote the piece from 1978–79 for a commission from the City of Turku, to celebrate its 750th anniversary. The Turku Philharmonic Orchestra premiered the work on 9 August 1979, under the direction of its principal conductor, Pertti Pekkanen.

== Structure ==
The symphony is in three movements:

1. Andante poco giocoso
2. Dona nobis pacem (attacca)
3. Finale

== Instrumentation ==
According to the publisher, Novello & Co, Symphony No. 4 is scored for the following:

- Woodwind: 3 flutes (2 doubling piccolo), 3 oboes, 3 clarinets in B♭ (1 doubling B♭ bass clarinet), 3 bassoons (1 doubling contrabassoon)
- Brass: 4 horns in F, 3 trumpets in B♭, 3 trombones, 1 tuba
- Percussion: timpani, 3 percussionists (individual instruments?)
- Strings: violins, violas, cellos, double basses, harp, celesta

== Recordings ==
To date, Symphony No. 4 has received three recordings, the first of which is from 1984 with Okko Kamu conducting the Helsinki Philharmonic on the Finlandia label. Finnish conductor Ari Rasilainen has also recorded the symphony as part of cpo's compendium of Sallinen's orchestral works. The Fourth Symphony joins the Second (Op. 29, 1972), the Horn Concerto (Op. 82, 2002), and Mauermusik (Op. 7, 1963) on the third volume of the cpo series.

Conductor	Orchestra	Year	Recording venue	Duration	Label (Available on)
Okko Kamu	Helsinki Philharmonic Orchestra	1984	Kulttuuritalo (Helsinki)	24:55	Finlandia (346)
James DePreist	Malmö Symphony Orchestra	1993	Malmö Concert Hall (Malmö)	23:38	BIS (607)
Ari Rasilainen	Norrköping Symphony Orchestra	2003	De Geerhallen (Norrköping)	23:05	cpo (999969-2)

== Notes, references, and sources ==
=== Sources ===
Books

- Korhonen, Kimmo (2007). Inventing Finnish Music: Contemporary Composers from Medieval to Modern. Finnish Music Information Center (FIMIC). ISBN 978-952-5076-61-5.

CD liner notes

- Anderson, Martin (2003). Aulis Sallinen: Symphonies 2 & 4; Horn Concerto; Mauermusik (booklet). Ari Rasilainen & Norrköping Symphony Orchestra. Germany: CPO. p. 10–13. CPO 999970-2.
- Weitzman, Ronald (1993). Aulis Sallinen: Symphony No. 4, Op. 49; Shadows, Op. 52; Symphony No. 5, 'Washington Mosaics', Op. 57 (booklet). James DePreist & Malmö Symphony Orchestra. Hamburg, Germany: BIS. p. 3–4. BIS CD-607.

Journal articles

- Scott, Phillip (2009). "Classical Recordings—Sallinen". Fanfare. 32 (5): 227–29. (subscription required)
- Weitzman, Ronald (1997). "Sallinen's Seven Symphonies". Tempo. New Series (202). Cambridge University Press: 8–15. (subscription required)
