= Paavo Haavikko =

Finnish writer (1931–2008)

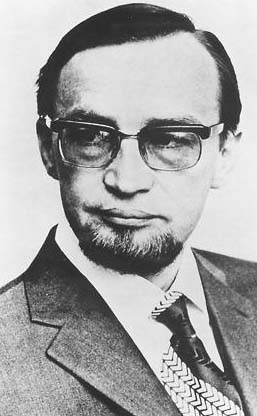
- Haavikko in 1960
- Born: 25 January 1931; Helsinki, Finland
- Died: 6 October 2008 (aged 77); Helsinki, Finland

Paavo Juhani Haavikko (January 25, 1931 – October 6, 2008) was a Finnish poet, playwright, essayist and publisher, considered one of the country's most outstanding writers. He published more than 70 works, and his poems have been translated to 12 languages.

== Biography ==
Paavo Haavikko was born and grew up in Helsinki. His father was a bookbinder and later worked in the import business. In 1951, Haavikko graduated from the Kallio Coeducational School, and published his first collection of poems.

In the 1950s, Haavikko published several more poetry collections, culminating in the collection entitled Talvipalatsi ('The Winter Palace'; 1959). He was at the forefront of the emerging modernist movement in Finland, and in the following decades he had a profound influence on many other genres as well. As a result of his literary achievements, he became the leading writer of his generation and of the entire postwar period in Finland.

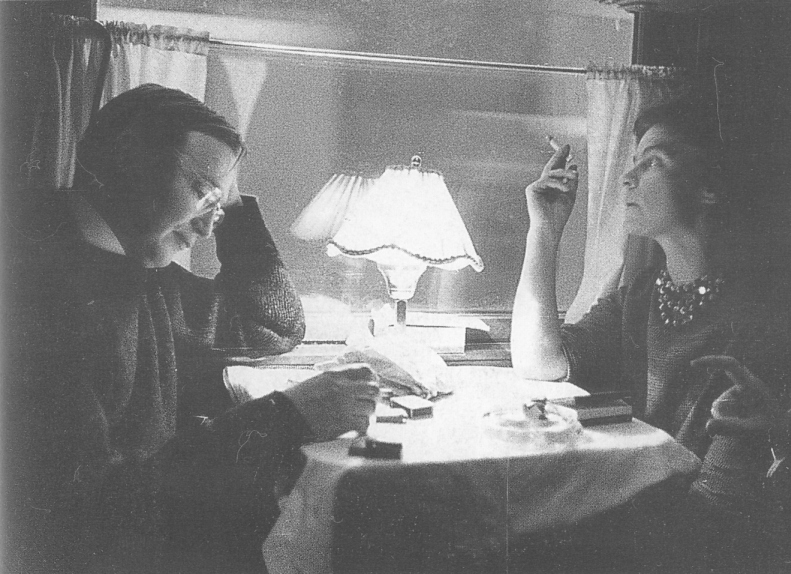
Paavo Haavikko with his first wife, the writer Marja-Liisa Vartio (1924–1966).

Haavikko's first wife Marja-Liisa Vartio was also a writer. They had two children. Marja-Liisa Vartio died in 1966, and Haavikko stopped writing for a long time. Haavikko married Ritva Rainio in 1971. They lived separately since 1983.

== Career as a writer ==
Haavikko started his career as a poet, but he published in almost every genre of literature. His drama has seldom been played on traditional theatre scenes. Television series Rauta-aika illustrated freely the Finnish National epic Kalevala. Operas Ratsumies (English title: The Horseman) and Kuningas lähtee Ranskaan (English title: The King goes forth to France) were composed by Aulis Sallinen to librettos by Haavikko.

Haavikko placed many of his works in historical context but included references to more modern politics, such as Juho Kusti Paasikivi and Stalin in his play Agricola ja kettu ('Agricola and the Fox'), or Urho Kaleva Kekkonen as a Viking ruler. He scrutinized Finland's leading politicians and civil servants in his column in weekly magazine Suomen Kuvalehti.

Images occurring often in Haavikko's poetry included the king, palaces, gardens, and the woods. Haavikko was talented in describing love, romantic and relationships between men and women. After the death of his first wife he started to write about subjects less discussed in poetry: economy, politics and society.

== Reception ==
The high opinion of Haavikko's poetry was not confined to his home country: John Ashbery considered The Winter Palace as "one of the great poems of the century".

== Business life ==
From 1967 to 1983, Haavikko was literary director of the Otava publishing company, and from 1989 to his death owner of the Art House publishing company.

He and his family had a company producing peat for fuel. He also owned forest. When he died, his family inherited 3 million euros.

== Honours ==
- Aleksis Kivi Prize, Finnish Literature Society, 1966
- Pro Finlandia Medal, 1967,
- Honorary Doctorate from the University of Helsinki, 1969
- Knight First Class of the White Rose of Finland, 1978
- Neustadt International Prize for Literature in 1984.
- In 1993, he won the Swedish Academy Nordic Prize, known as the 'little Nobel'.
- America Award, 2007

== Works ==
Haavikko's works represent many different literary genres, including the librettos for the two operas. His career as is exceptional in its mere productivity: a book every eight months according to his own reckoning.

=== Poetry ===
- Tiet etäisyyksiin (1951) WSOY
- Tuuliöinä (1953) Otava
- Synnyinmaa (1955) Otava
- Lehdet lehtiä (1958) Otava
- Talvipalatsi (1959) Otava (The Winter Palace)
- Puut, kaikki heidän vihreytensä (1966) Otava
- Runoja matkalta salmen ylitse (1973) Otava
- Kaksikymmentä ja yksi (1974) Otava; English translation One and twenty (2007) Translated by Anselm Hollo. Beaverton: Aspasia Books. ISBN 978-0-9783488-1-6
- Viiniä, kirjoitusta (1976) Otava. ISBN 951-1-02452-3.
- Puolustuspuhe (1977) WSOY - poems and aforisms
- Viisi sarjaa nopeasti virtaavasta elämästä (1987) Art House
- Toukokuu, ikuinen (1988) Art House
- Rakkaudesta ja kuolemasta (1989) Art House
- Talvirunoja (1990) Art House
- Puiden ylivertaisuudesta (1993) Art House
- Prosperon runot (2001) Art House

=== Poetry compilations ===
- Runot 1951–1961 (1962) Otava
- Runot 1949–1974 (1975) Otava
- Runoelmat (1975) Otava
- Sillat. Valitut runot (1984) Otava
- Runot! Runot 1984–1992 WSOY 1992
  Includes After the Deadline (1984), Con amore, con furore (1985), Viisi sarjaa nopeasti virtaavasta elämästä (1987), Toukokuu, ikuinen (1988), Talvirunoja (1990), Musta herbaario (1992) and all the poems from aphorism books Pimeys (1984) and Kansalaisvapaudesta (1989). When After the Deadline and Con amore, con furore were first published, the author distributed them only to a small circle of friends. Musta herbaario was previously unpublished.
- Kirjainmerkit mustat. Runot 1949–1966 (1993) WSOY
- Tyrannin ylistys. Runot 1970–1981 (1994) WSOY
- Valitut runot (2006) WSOY

=== Plays ===
- Münchausen; Nuket: Kaksi näytelmää (1960) Otava
- Ylilääkäri: Kaksi näytelmää (1968) Otava. Includes plays Ylilääkäri and Agricola ja kettu.
- Soitannollinen ilta Viipurissa 1918 (1978) Otava ISBN 951-1-04977-1.
- Viisi pientä draamallista tekstiä (1981) Otava ISBN 951-1-06332-4.
- Sulka: 12 näytelmää (1997) WSOY. ISBN 951-0-21855-3.
  Includes: Sulka (1973). Ratsumies (1974) (The Horseman), Kuningas lähtee Ranskaan (1974) (The King Goes Forth to France), Harald Pitkäikäinen (1974), Agricola ja kettu (1968), Kuningas Harald, jäähyväiset (radio play, 1978), Kaisa ja Otto (1976), Herra Östanskog (1981), Ne vahvimmat miehet ei ehjiksi jää (1976), Naismetsä (radio play, 1989), Englantilainen tarina (1990), Anastasia ja minä (1992) (Anastasya and I).
- Airo ja Brita (1999) Art House ISBN 951-884-259-0.
- Hitlerin sateenvarjo (2004) WSOY ISBN 951-0-29123-4.

=== Other prose ===
- Kullervon tarina (1982) (Kullervo's Story)

=== Libretti ===
- Paavo the Great. Great Race. Great Dream. (2000)
- Ratsumies (1974) (The Horseman)
- Kuningas lähtee Ranskaan (1974) (The King Goes Forth to France),
