= Symphony No. 1 (Sallinen) =

Symphony in one movement by Aulis Sallinen

- by Aulis Sallinen
- Opus: 24
- Composed: 1970–71
- Duration: Approx. 16 minutes
- Movements: 1

Premiere
- Date: 2 December 1971
- Location: Finlandia Hall, Helsinki, Finland
- Conductor: Jorma Panula
- Performers: Helsinki Philharmonic Orchestra

The Symphony No. 1 (originally titled: Sinfonia), Op. 24, is an orchestral composition by the Finnish composer Aulis Sallinen, who began writing the piece in 1970 when the City of Helsinki announced a composers' competition to mark the inauguration of Finlandia Hall. Completing the symphony in 1971, Sallinen was awarded First Prize in the contest; the Helsinki Philharmonic Orchestra and its music director, Jorma Panula, premiered the work at Finlandia Hall during the 2 December inaugural festivities.

== Instrumentation ==
According to the publisher, Novello & Co, Symphony No. 1 is scored for the following:

- Woodwind: 3 flutes (1 doubling piccolo), 3 oboes, 3 clarinets in B♭ (1 doubling B♭ bass clarinet), 2 bassoons, 1 contrabassoon
- Brass: 4 horns in F, 3 trumpets in B♭, 2 trombones, 1 bass trombone
- Percussion: timpani, 4 percussionists (bass drum, snare drum, wood blocks, tam-tam, cymbals, glockenspiel, marimba, vibraphone, tubular bells)
- Strings: violins, violas, cellos, double basses, harp

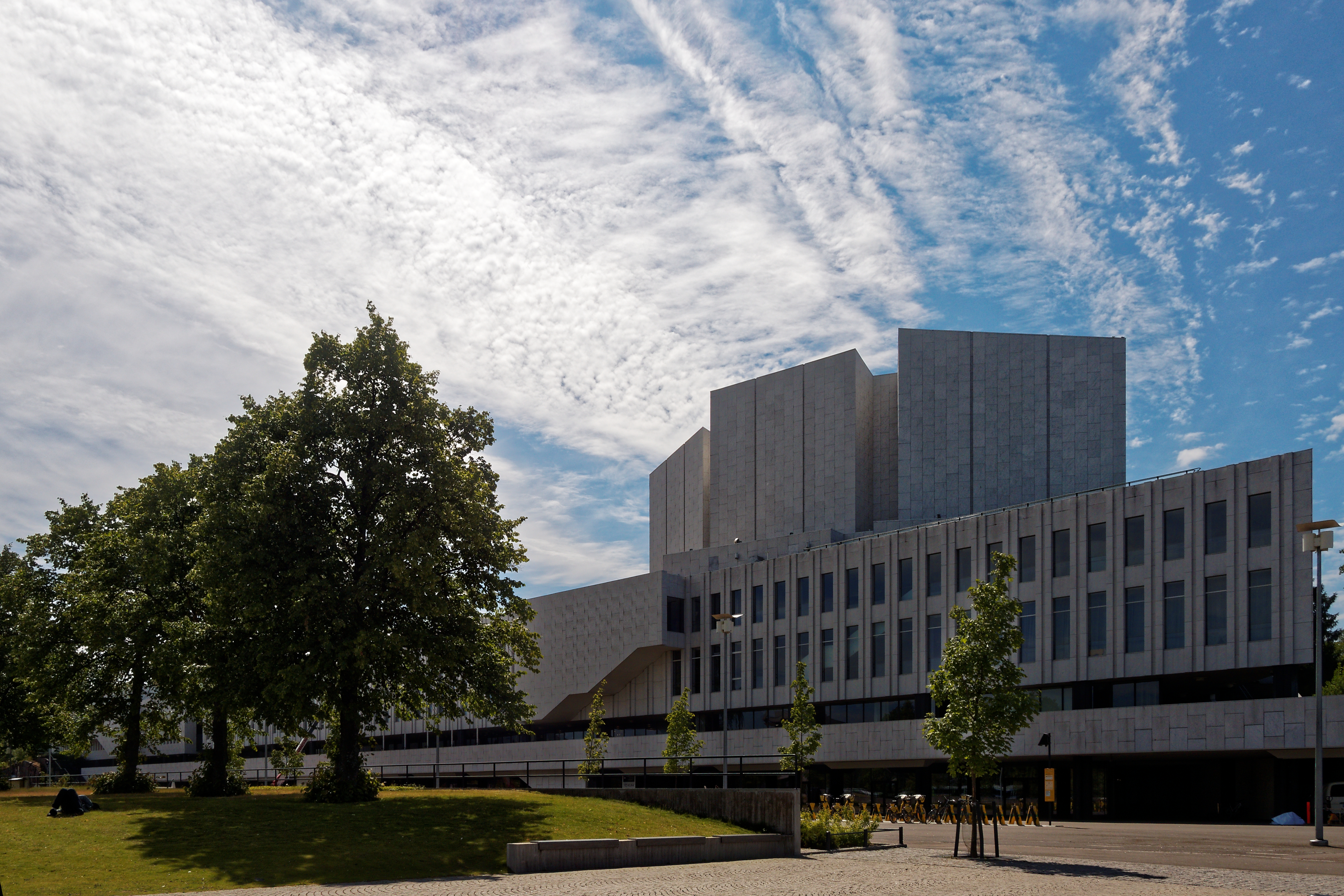
Finlandia Hall, at which the HPO premiered Sallinen's First Symphony

== Recordings ==
To date, Symphony No. 1 has received two recordings, the first of which is from 1972 with Okko Kamu conducting the Finnish Radio Symphony Orchestra on the BIS label. Finnish conductor Ari Rasilainen has also recorded the symphony as part of cpo's compendium of Sallinen's orchestral works. The First Symphony joins the Seventh (Op. 71, 1996), Chorali (Op. 22, 1970), and A Solemn Overture (Op. 75, 1997) on the first volume of the cpo series.

Conductor	Orchestra	Year	Recording venue	Duration	Label (Available on)
Okko Kamu	Finnish Radio Symphony Orchestra	1972	Finlandia Hall (Helsinki)	16:42	BIS (41)
Ari Rasilainen	Staatsphilharmonie Rheinland-Pfalz	2002	Philharmonie (Ludwigshafen)	14:11	cpo (999918-2)

== Notes, references, and sources ==
=== Sources ===
Books

- Howell, Tim (2006). After Sibelius: Studies in Finnish Music. Routledge. ISBN 978-075-4651-77-2.
- Korhonen, Kimmo (2007). Inventing Finnish Music: Contemporary Composers from Medieval to Modern. Finnish Music Information Center (FIMIC). ISBN 978-952-5076-61-5.

CD liner notes

- Anderson, Martin (2003). Aulis Sallinen: Symphonies 1 & 7 (booklet). Ari Rasilainen & Deutsche Staatsphilharmonie Rheinland-Pfalz. Germany: CPO. p. 13–14. CPO 999918-2.
- Kamu, Okko (English translation: William Jewson) (1987). Aulis Sallinen: Sinfonia — Chorali — Sinfonia III (booklet). Okko Kamu & Finnish Radio Symphony Orchestra. Hamburg, Germany: BIS. BIS CD-41.

Journal articles

- Weitzman, Ronald (1997). "Sallinen's Seven Symphonies". Tempo. New Series (202). Cambridge University Press: 8–15. doi:10.1017/S0040298200048889. S2CID 143851973. (subscription required)
