= Concerto for Two Accordions, Strings and Percussion (Sallinen) =

Musical composition by Aulis Sallinen

The Concerto for Two Accordions, Strings and Percussion, Op. 115 by Aulis Sallinen was written in 2019. It was commissioned by the Ostrobothnian Chamber Orchestra, which premiered it under Anna-Maria Helsing on February 14, 2020 in the 22nd Kokkola Winter Accordion Festival, with soloists Sonja Vertainen and Janne Valkeajoki. The work consists of two movements, titled Duo Concertante I and Duo Concertante II, and lasts about 20 minutes.

While Sallinen was initially commissioned to write a solo accordion concerto, he decided to add a second accordion which he thought provided a more versatile setting and allowed him to switch his brain "into a new position" as he had never written for accordion duo, while the percussion part was meant to work both as a contrasting element and a solid foundation holding the work together. The second movement includes a quote from a Kokkolan folksong.

== Reception ==
Kari Pappinen from Keskipohjanmaa described it as a composition featuring solid but exciting material within a clear continuum, praising its skillful exploration of harmonic colors and interaction between soloists and orchestra.
