= Kullervo (Sallinen) =

Opera in two acts by Aulis Sallinen

- Opera by Aulis Sallinen
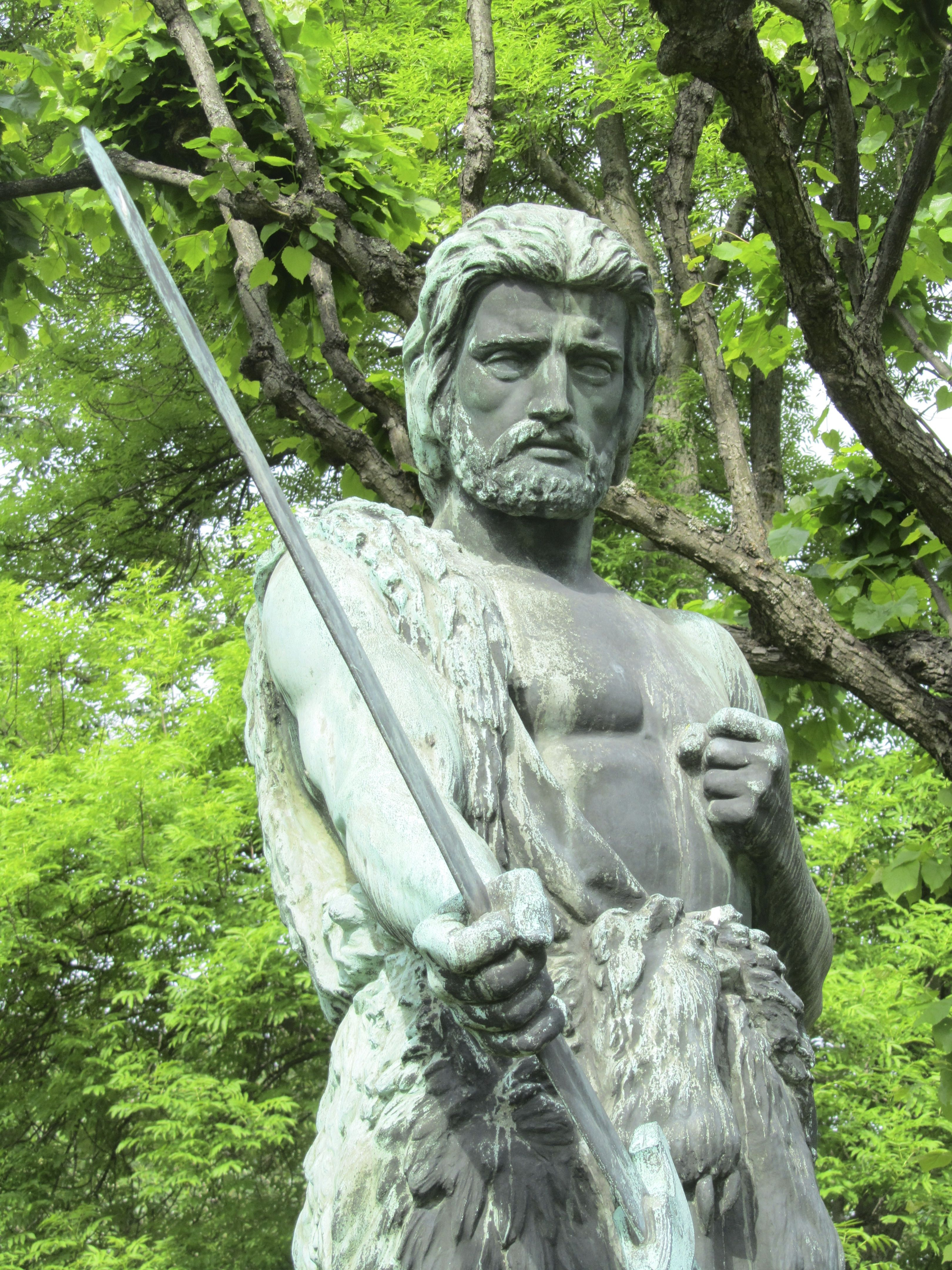
- Carl Sjöstrand's statue of Kullervo, a Finnish mythological figure and the opera's protagonist
- Librettist: Aulis Sallinen
- Premiere: 25 February 1992; Los Angeles Music Center

Kullervo is an opera in two acts, Op. 61, composed by Aulis Sallinen to his own libretto based on the story of Kullervo in the Finnish epic Kalevala. The opera premiered on 25 February 1992 at the Los Angeles Music Center.

== Background ==
The opera was commissioned by the Finnish National Opera and composed between 1986 and 1988. It was intended for the opening of a new national opera house in Helsinki, but building construction delays meant that the work was presented in Los Angeles as part of the celebrations of the 75th anniversary of Finnish independence. The English version (1991) was by composer Stephen Oliver (who had already translated The Red Line and The King goes forth to France for Sallinen.

Kullervo was first performed on 25 February 1992 at the Los Angeles Music Center with the soloists, chorus and stage production from the Finnish National Opera and Los Angeles Chamber Orchestra. It was recorded by the original cast and issued on CD by Ondine Records.

The work opened the new Helsinki opera house in 1993 and from its premiere until 2014 had been seen in six countries and three languages, in over 70 performances. The first performances outside the United States and Finland were given by the Opéra de Nantes in December 1995, with Jorma Hynninen in the title role and Koen Kessels conducting. Eeva-Liisa Saarinen, Vesa-Matti Loiri and Pertti Makela also reprised their roles from the premiere.

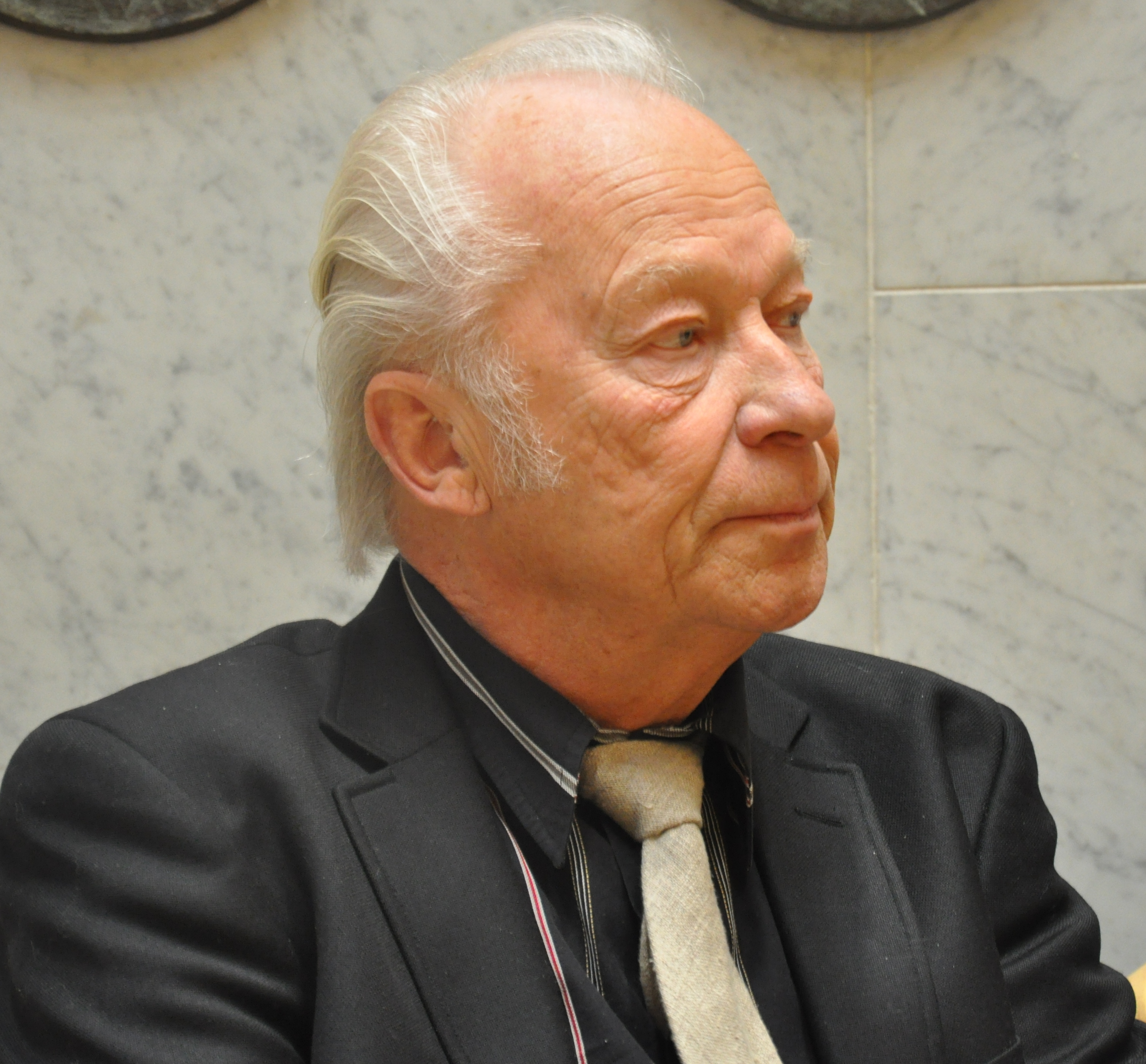
Composer Aulis Sallinen

The scenario of Sallinen's fifth opera, between The King Goes Forth to France (Savonlinna, 1984) and The Palace (Savonlinna, 1995), is based on the Kalevala epic and the 1864 play by Aleksis Kivi. In a later interview, the composer, reflecting on King Lear (on which he was then working) and Kullervo, stated that the earlier opera "is a very black story – it's the most Shakespearean story ever to exist in Finland". One reviewer has commented: "To call Kullervo dark and brutal does not do full justice to the opera", citing the love of Kullervo's mother, friendship with Kimmo, even humour from the hunter. However, another, describing the premiere, wrote that "not every new opera packs so immediate a punch, or leaves one feeling – as with the works of Janáček – at once depressed at so bleak a view of the world [...] yet inspired and even elated by the dispassionate passion with which that view has been expressed".

The music has "a strong tonal basis" and "colourful effects enhanced by some imaginative instrumentation". Another critic noted that there "is not a superfluous quaver in Kullervo" and admired the "sinuously coiled melodies [...] quirky ostinato figures, long-held pedal-points, sardonically percussive setting of arioso dialogue".

Sallinen was not the first Finnish composer to turn to the story of Kullervo for musical inspiration: Robert Kajanus wrote Kullervo's Funeral March, Op. 3 (1880), then Jean Sibelius wrote a five-movement symphonic work Kullervo, Op. 7 (1892), for soprano, baritone, male choir and orchestra (subsequently withdrawn by the composer and sometimes referred to as his "Kullervo Symphony"), and Leevi Madetoja composed a symphonic poem, Kullervo, Op. 15 in 1913.

== Roles ==
Role	Voice type	Premiere cast, 25 February 1992 (conductor: Ulf Söderblom)
Kullervo	baritone	Jorma Hynninen
Unto	baritone	Juha Kotilainen
Kalervo	bass	Martti Wallén
Kimmo	tenor	Jorma Silvasti
Mother	mezzo-soprano	Eeva-Liisa Saarinen
Sister	soprano	Satu Vihavainen
The Smith's wife	mezzo-soprano	Anna-Lisa Jakobson
Unto's wife	alto	Paula Etelävuori
Blind singer	vocal	Vesa-Matti Loiri
First man	tenor	Matti Heinikari
Second man	baritone	Esa Ruuttunen
Hunter	tenor	Pertti Makela
Tiera	bass	Marko Putkonen
Chorus

== Orchestration ==
The opera is scored for a large variety of instruments, including three woodwinds, four horns, three trumpets, three trombones, tuba, timpani, percussion, harp, synthesizer and strings.

== Synopsis ==
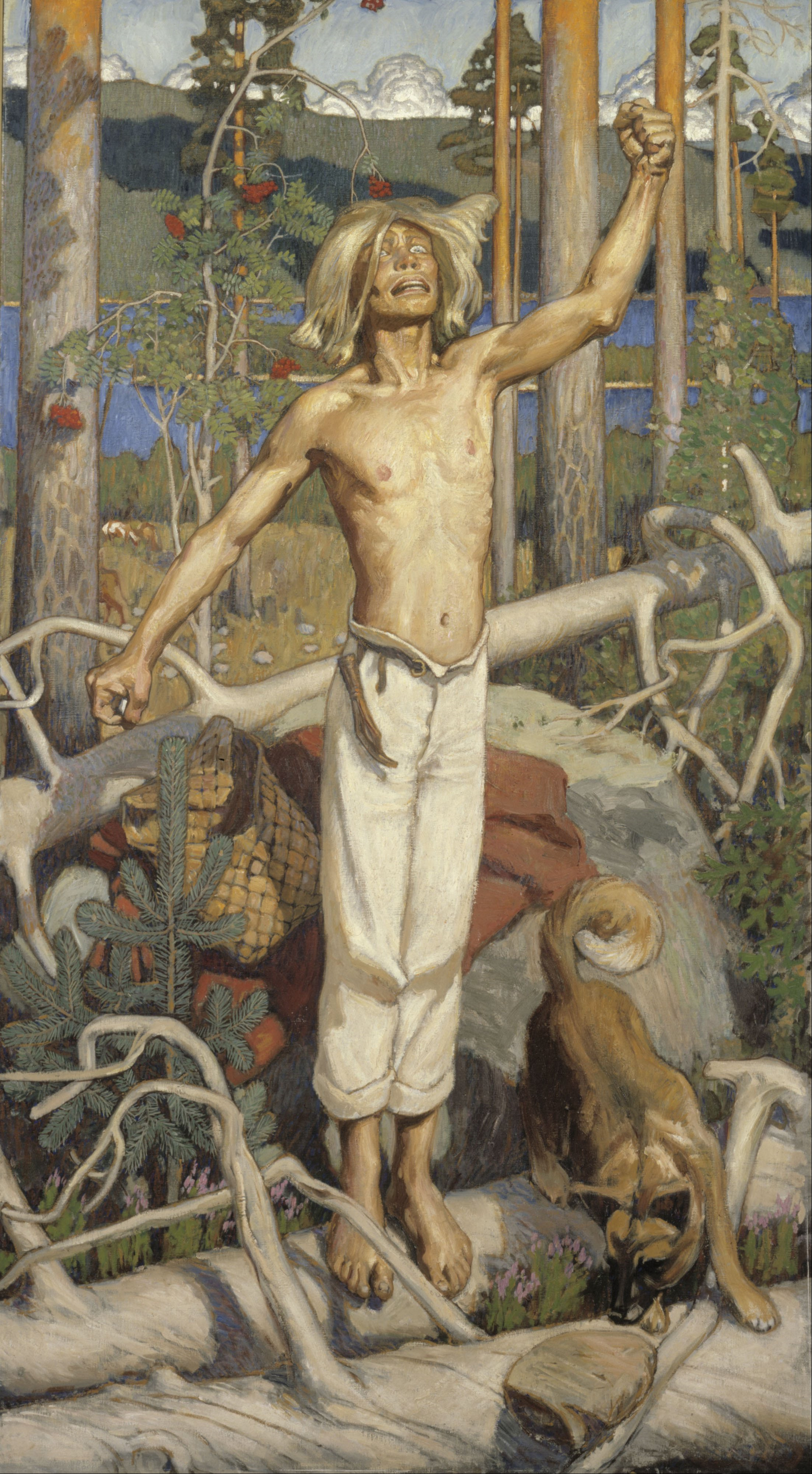
Kullervo's Curse by Akseli Gallen-Kallela

=== Act 1 ===
The act begins with a choral prologue recounting the feud between Kalervo and his brother Unto, leaders of opposing clans. Unto had burnt down Kalervo's house and believes that the entire family has been killed in the fire apart from Kalervo's young son Kullervo whom Unto has taken as a slave.

Kullervo proves to be a disturbed and unruly youth consumed with rage, some of which he turns against his childhood friend Kimmo. Unto's wife urges him to kill Kullervo, but wracked by guilt at what he had done to his brother's family, Unto sells Kullervo on to the blacksmith instead, who puts him to work tending cattle.

After an episode in the fields where Kullervo discovers that the blacksmith's wife has baked stones into his bread, he kills all the cattle and returns to the smith's house. A violent quarrel between Kullervo and the blacksmith's wife ensues. He kills her with the broken knife that had belonged to his father and flees.

Meanwhile, Kimmo finds Kullervo's mother and father, who had survived the fire, and hopes to reunite the family. Kullervo's father recounts what had happened to them after the fire while his mother mourns the disappearance of Kullervo's sister Ainikki.

By chance, Kullervo arrives at his parents' house. At first he and his parents do not recognise each other, but with the arrival of Kimmo the truth is revealed. Kullervo's father is horrified that his son has become a murderer and wants him to leave while his mother pleads for him to stay. Kimmo blames himself for what has happened.

=== Act 2 ===
The act opens with a dream sequence fueled by Kullervo's rage at all that has happened to him. His lost sister Ainikki appears in the dream as does a blind singer who tells him that the girl he had seduced earlier was Ainikki. The blind man sings "The Song of a Sister's Ravishing".

In the next scene Kalervo, still horrified by Kullervo's behaviour, refuses to acknowledge him as his son. In retaliation Kullervo tells his parents that he had unknowingly slept with Ainikki. Realizing that he cannot stay in his father's house after this revelation, Kullervo sets out to wreak revenge on Unto by burning down his house.

Kimmo finds Kullervo on his way to Unto's house and tells him that both his parents and his sister are now dead. On hearing this, Kullervo (who has been joined by the warrior Tjiera, two strangers, and the hunter) vows to kill Unto and all his clan. When the slaughter is complete, he goes in search of Kimmo.

Kullervo finds his friend only to discover that Kimmo has become insane. He does not recognize Kullervo and instead believes him to be a "Christ-like figure that carries the world's sins on his shoulders." Distraught, Kullervo bids farewell to Kimmo, throws himself onto a fire, and is burnt alive.
