= Symphony No. 5 (Sallinen) =

Symphony in five movements by Aulis Sallinen

- Washington Mosaics
- by Aulis Sallinen
- Opus: 57
- Composed: 1984–85 (r. 1987)
- Duration: Approx. 38 minutes
- Movements: 5

Premiere
- Date: 10 October 1985
- Location: Kennedy Center, Washington, D.C., United States
- Conductor: Mstislav Rostropovich
- Performers: National Symphony Orchestra

The Symphony No. 5, Washington Mosaics, Op. 57, is an orchestral composition by the Finnish composer Aulis Sallinen, who wrote the piece from 1984–85, revising the finale in 1987. The National Symphony Orchestra, the commissioning institution, premiered the work in 10 October 1985 at the Kennedy Center in Washington, D.C., under the direction of its music director, Mstislav Rostropovich.

== Composition ==
=== History ===
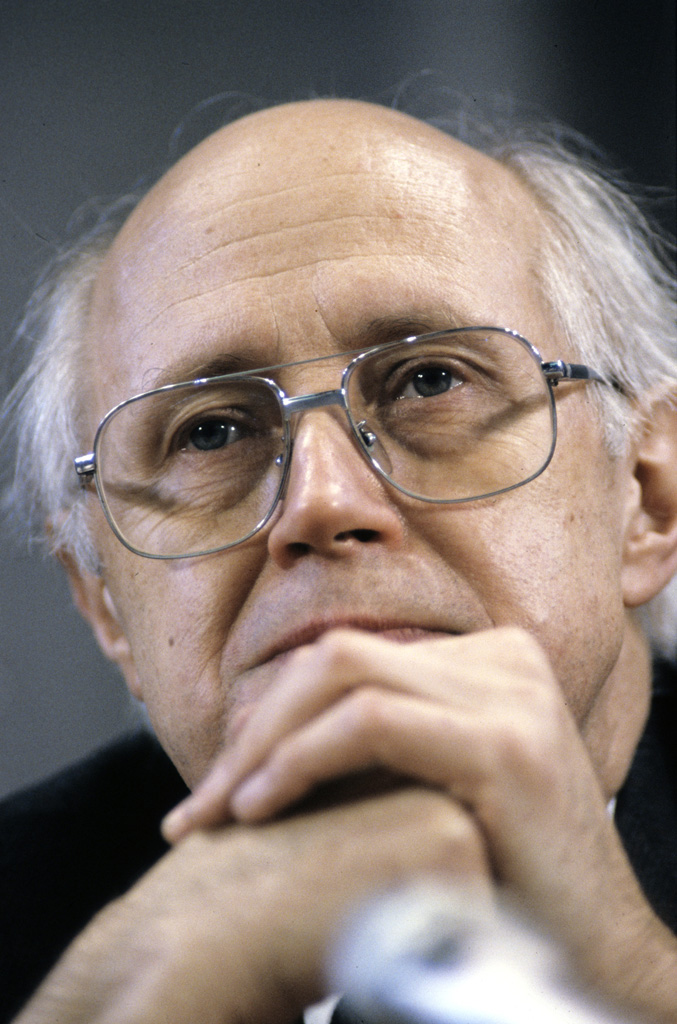
Mstislav Rostropovich, who commissioned Sallinen's Fifth Symphony and conducted its world premiere

=== Structure ===
The symphony is in five movements:

1. Washington Mosaics I
2. Intermezzo I
3. Intermezzo II
4. Intermezzo III (attacca)
5. Washington Mosaics II

=== Instrumentation ===
According to the publisher, Novello & Co, Symphony No. 5 is scored for the following:

- Woodwind: 4 flutes (2 doubling piccolo), 4 oboes, 4 clarinets in B♭ (1 doubling E♭ clarinet, 1 doubling B♭ bass clarinet), 4 bassoons (1 doubling contrabassoon)
- Brass: 6 horns in F, 4 trumpets in B♭, 4 trombones, 1 tuba
- Percussion: timpani, 4 percussionists (bass drum, military drum, snare drum, tenor drum, tom-toms, bongo drums, wood blocks, castanets, tam-tam, cymbals, suspended cymbal, triangle, cowbell, glockenspiel, xylophone, vibraphone, marimba, tubular bells)
- Strings: violins, violas, cellos, double basses, harp, celesta, piano

== Reception ==
=== Notable performances ===
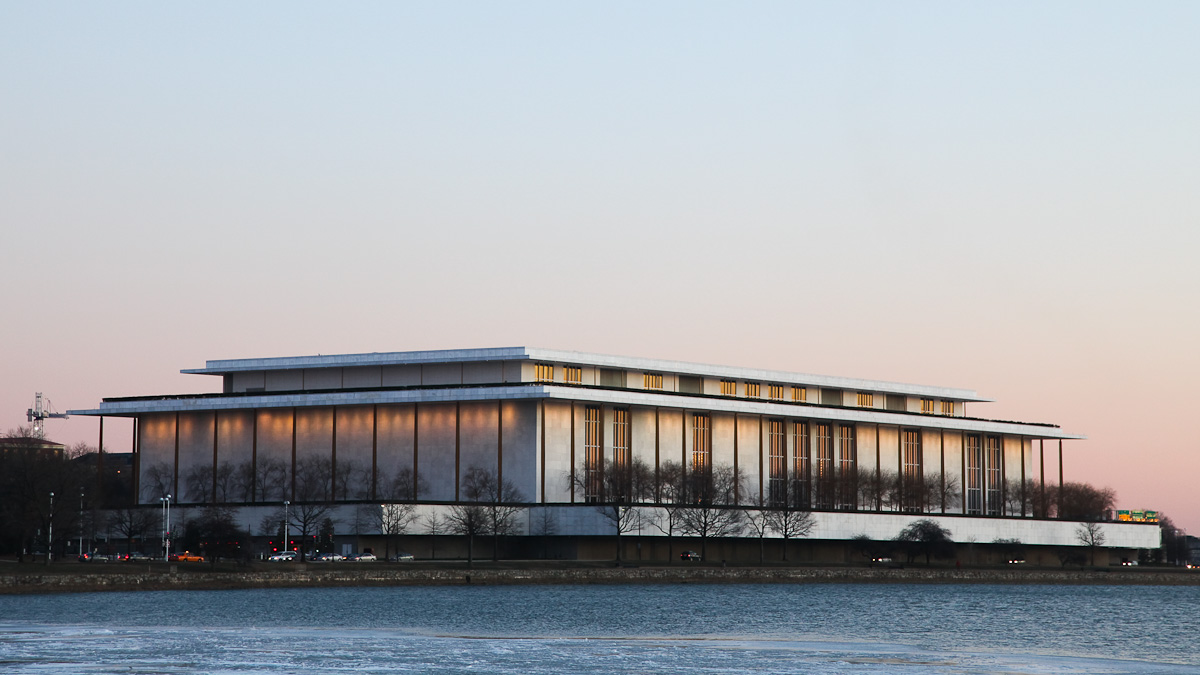
The John F. Kennedy Center for the Performing Arts, at which the NSO premiered Sallinen's Fifth Symphony

The Fifth Symphony had its world premiere on 10 October 1985, with Mstislav Rostropovich conducting the National Symphony Orchestra (NSO) at the Kennedy Center; also on the program was Sibelius's tone poem, En saga, and Beethoven's Second Symphony. The Washington Post reviewed the work with ambivalence, calling it a "big, ambitious new symphony" with "genuinely moving moments" that nonetheless was "more intriguing than convincing," its "disjointed brilliance" unable "to resolve emotionally". Three days later, Rostropovich and the NSO played the Fifth Symphony at Avery Fisher Hall in New York, along with Shostakovich's Fifth Symphony and Haydn's Cello Concerto in C major (Rostropovich serving as soloist). On 23 September 1988, Rostropovich and the NSO performed the revised version of the Fifth, again at the Kennedy Center in Washington; also on the program was Mozart's serenade for strings, Eine Kleine Nachtmusik, and Grieg's two Peer Gynt Suites.

The British premiere took place on 15 February 1987, with Okko Kamu conducting the London Philharmonic at the Royal Festival Hall; also on the program was Gounod's St. Cecilia Mass. The performance of Sallinen's Fifth, which commenced London's three-month multi-venue, multi-orchestra 'Spotlight on Finland' music festival, was received positively, with The Financial Times characterizing the work as consisting of "icy fragments of symphonic material [that] have been chipped off to clink and tinkle in Sallinen's structural cocktail shaker". While noting the Fifth Symphony's "allusions to other music" (in particular its "post-Sibelian desolation"), The Sunday Times applauded the "vitality of Sallinen's rhythms and the sheer eventfulness of his scoring," as well as his "imaginative and masterly ... handling of the large orchestra".

=== Recordings ===
To date, Symphony No. 5 has received three recordings, the first of which is from 1987 with Okko Kamu conducting the Helsinki Philharmonic on the Finlandia label. Finnish conductor Ari Rasilainen has also recorded the symphony as part of cpo's compendium of Sallinen's orchestral works. The Fifth Symphony joins the Third (Op. 35, 1975) on the penultimate volume of the cpo series. In his review of this CD (cpo 999970-2), Fanfare's Phillip Scott applauds Rasilainen for "performances of sensitivity and clarity, aided by a stunning recording", albeit played with less obvious irony than DePriest's effort with the Malmö Symphony Orchestra. Calling the Fifth and the Third "the pinnacle of Sallinen's orchestral work", he concludes: "Anyone curious about the symphony in contemporary music should own this [cpo] disc". Writing for the American Record Guide, Paul Cook describes Rasilainen's interpretation of Symphony No. 5 (relative to his handling of the Third) "much more adroit and he gets it exactly right ... Despite my quibbles [on the Third], this is an excellent release and I think the Fifth deserves your attention".

Conductor	Orchestra	Year	Recording venue	Duration	Label (Available on)
Okko Kamu	Helsinki Philharmonic Orchestra	1987	Kulttuuritalo (Helsinki)	37:32	Finlandia (370)
James DePreist	Malmö Symphony Orchestra	1993	Malmö Concert Hall (Malmö)	39:31	BIS (607)
Ari Rasilainen	Staatsphilharmonie Rheinland-Pfalz	2004	Philharmonie (Ludwigshafen)	38:17	cpo (999970-2)

== Notes, references, and sources ==
=== Sources ===
Books

- Howell, Tim (2006). After Sibelius: Studies in Finnish Music. Routledge. ISBN 978-075-4651-77-2.
- Korhonen, Kimmo (2007). Inventing Finnish Music: Contemporary Composers from Medieval to Modern. Finnish Music Information Center (FIMIC). ISBN 978-952-5076-61-5.

CD liner notes

- Anderson, Martin (2008). Aulis Sallinen: Symphonies 3 & 5 (booklet). Ari Rasilainen & Deutsche Staatsphilharmonie Rheinland-Pfalz. Germany: CPO. p. 13–14. CPO 999970-2.
- Weitzman, Ronald (1993). Aulis Sallinen: Symphony No. 4, Op. 49; Shadows, Op. 52; Symphony No. 5, 'Washington Mosaics', Op. 57 (booklet). James DePreist & Malmö Symphony Orchestra. Hamburg, Germany: BIS. p. 5–8. BIS CD-607.

Journal articles

- Cook, Paul (2008). "Guide to Records: Sallinen—Symphony 3+5". The American Record Guide. 71 (5): 166. (subscription required)
- Pike, Lionel (1997). "Reviewed Works: Symphony No. 5 ('Washington Mosaics') by Aulis Sallinen". Music & Letters. 71 (4). Oxford University Press: 625–27. (subscription required)
- Scott, Phillip (2009). "Classical Recordings—Sallinen". Fanfare. 32 (5): 227–29. (subscription required)
- Weitzman, Ronald (1997). "Sallinen's Seven Symphonies". Tempo. New Series (202). Cambridge University Press: 8–15. (subscription required)

News reports

- Cairns, David (1987-02-22). "A Festival of Finns". Issue 8481. The Sunday Times. London, England.
- Griffiths, Paul (1987-02-17). "Review of LPO/Kamu at the Festival Hall". Issue 62694. The Times. London, England.
- Loppert, Max (1987-02-17). "Sallinen's Fifth/Festival Hall". Section 1, The Arts. Financial Times. London, England. p. 15.
- McLellan, Joseph (1985-10-14). "Ovation for the Maestro". The Washington Post. Washington, DC.
- McLellan, Joseph (1988-09-23). "NSO's Refined 'Mosaics'". Style. The Washington Post. Washington, DC. p. B2.
- Rockwell, John (1985-10-11). "The Many Facets of Rostropovich". Section C, Weekend Desk. The New York Times. New York, NY.
- Tuck, Lon (1985-10-11). "Sallinen's Disjointed Brilliance". Section: Metro. The Washington Post. Washington, DC. p. B6.
