= Kuningas lähtee Ranskaan =

Opera in three acts by Aulis Sallinen

Kuningas lähtee Ranskaan The King Goes Forth to France
- Opera by Aulis Sallinen
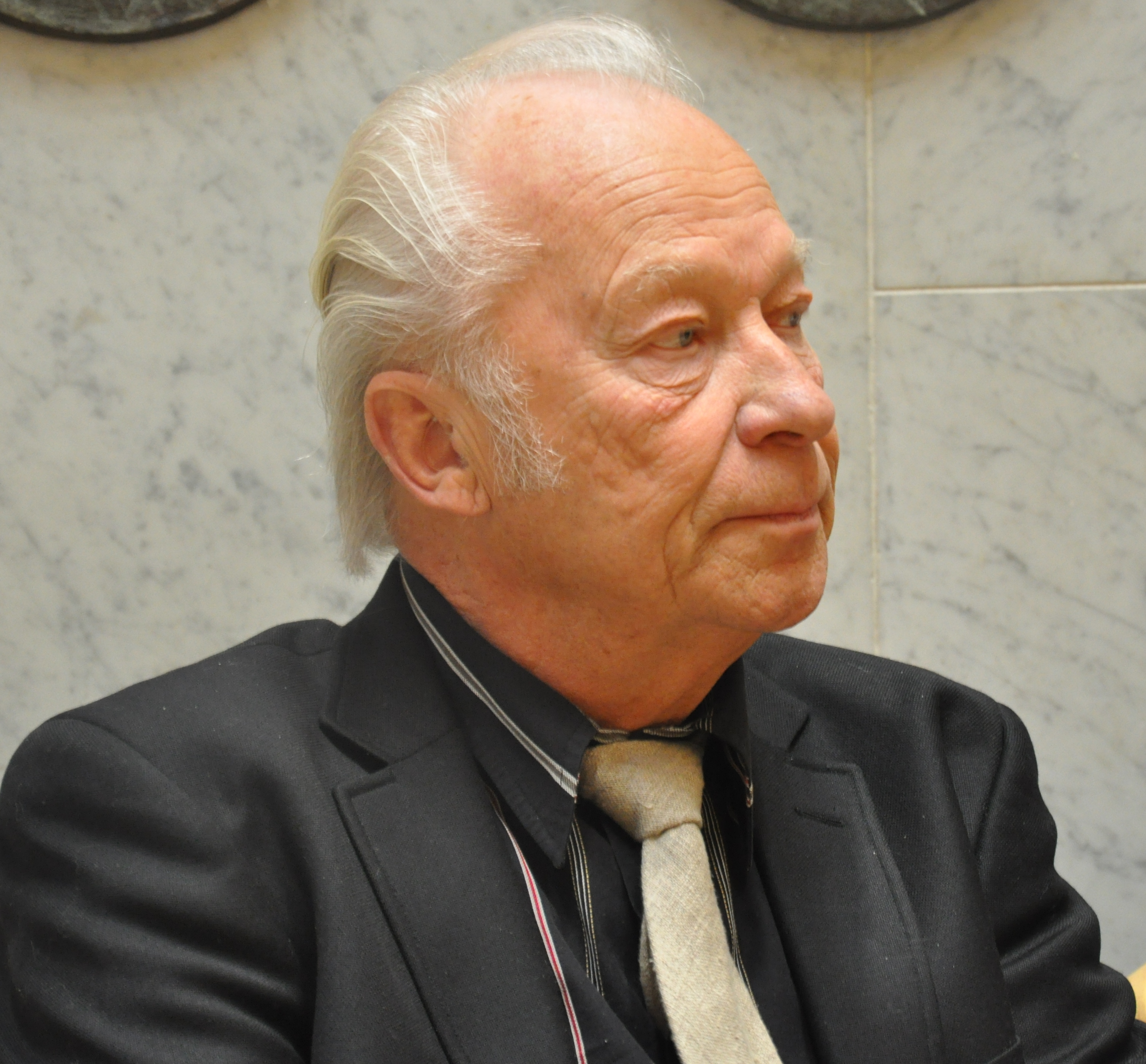
- Aulis Sallinen in 2009
- Librettist: Paavo Haavikko
- Language: Finnish
- Based on: Haavikko's novel
- Premiere: 7 July 1984; Savonlinna Opera Festival

Kuningas lähtee Ranskaan (English: The King Goes Forth to France) is an opera in three acts by Aulis Sallinen, based on the novel of the same title by Paavo Haavikko, who also wrote the libretto. The English singing version is by Stephen Oliver.

== Background ==
Kuningas lähtee Ranskaan was first performed on 7 July 1984 by the Savonlinna Opera Festival, and revived at the festival in the three years that followed. Later performances have taken place at the Kiel Opera House (1986, in a cut version not approved by the composer), the Santa Fe Opera Festival (1986) and the Royal Opera House, Covent Garden (1987). A concert performance of the opera in Helsinki in 2005 was recorded by Ondine. The English title and the translation by Oliver (who had already made a translation of The Red Line in 1980) was undertaken in collaboration with the composer at his home in Helsinki; Sallinen commented that the "virtuosity Stephen showed during our sessions was astounding".

In 1973 Paavo Haavikko wrote a play for radio and in 1977 rang Sallinen to ask whether, if the composer was considering writing another opera, this story could become the libretto? Sallinen's first opera The Horseman had a libretto by Haavikko but the composer was cautious about taking up the suggestion. Eventually, having read the play, Sallinen came to like the ambiguous blend of tragedy and irony, wit and cruelty; he began composing in the summer of 1980. The opera was jointly commissioned by the Savonlinna Opera Festival, the Royal Opera, London, and the BBC, and is set during a future ice age and in the time of the Hundred Years' War. Around the time of writing this, his third opera, Sallinen commented "It’s always worthwhile to write an opera. If it’s a success, I’m happy, if it isn’t, somebody else’s happy".

With Kuningas lähtee Ranskaan Sallinen moved away from the overtly Finnish subject matter of his previous operas, creating a universal allegory. John Allison noted (in relation to the recording) "this opera is notable for its lightness of texture. The composer has a witty way of evoking ceremonial moments... a wild arrangement of a Schubert Marche Militaire in D is put to dark dramatic use... there is sweep and pace – in short it shows Sallinen’s innate theatricality."

Rodney Milnes describes the work as both poetic and disturbing: a journey from farcical, inconsequential and irreverent comedy moving through increasingly sardonic episodes to the final image of a brutalised, unstoppable army challenging the audience.

Shadows (Prelude for orchestra) opus 52, is an orchestral work by Sallinen written straight after he completed the second act of The King Goes Forth to France, related thematically but independent from the opera, "its lyrical and dramatic ingredients reflecting the philosophy of the opera". It was first performed on 30 November 1982 by the National Symphony Orchestra conducted by Mstislav Rostropovich.

== Roles ==
Role	Voice type	Premiere Cast, 7 July 1984, (Conductor: Okko Kamu)
Froissart	spoken	Heikki Kinnunen
Guide	tenor	Heikki Siukola
The Prince (later the King)	baritone	Jorma Hynninen
The Prime Minister (later his son, the Young Prime Minister)	bass	Jaakko Ryhänen
The Nice Caroline	soprano	Eeva-Liisa Naumanen-Saarinen
The Caroline with the Thick Mane	mezzo-soprano	Marjatta Airas
The Anne who Steals	soprano	Tanja Kauppinen
The Anne who Strips	mezzo-soprano	Pia-Gunn Anckar
The Queen	soprano	Helena Salonius
The Blind King of Bohemia	mute	Henrik Wilenius
Nurse		
English Archer	baritone	Tero Hannula
French Prisoner		
Six Burghers of Calais		
People and bureaucrats of England, Genoese crossbowmen, People of Calais, Parliament (a cannon)

== Synopsis ==
Act 1

Prologue

A garden at the English court in May. The guide and chorus portray England in an encroaching Ice Age. The prime minister suggests that it would be a good time for the prince to choose a wife, for which purpose he presents the two Carolines and the two Annes.

Scene 1

The Carolines and Annes introduce themselves and sing of their identical purposes: to become the prince's wife.

Scene 2

The prince is concerned by the strange nature of the spring, but the prime minister brushes aside his worries and tells him to make the most of his youth and select a bride. The prince decides to assume power, ordering his fleet away from the English Channel, where it had been breaking up the advancing ice, and plans to march to France, crossing the frozen sea. With him he will take parliament (in the form of a giant cannon) and the four suitors. When the prime minister expresses fears about war, the prince makes the prime minister's office hereditary.

Scene 3

The four girls prepare to set off, Caroline with the Mane believing that she will soon marry the prince. The Nice Caroline realises that the Caroline with the Mane is mentally unstable and persuades the others to humour her.

Scene 4

A bridge of ice firm enough to carry an army covers the Channel; the girls cross it as their country is submerged by the ice. The take with them no souvenirs except their memories. During the march the prince and prime minister become friends – the prime minister the prince's friend, the prince, the prime minister's King.

Act 2

Scene 5

Arriving at the French coast, the Caroline with the Mane awaits the King and her marriage, while the other ladies sing to her with barely concealed sarcasm and eroticism. The king is however being married to a German princess; the others comfort Caroline with the Mane, saying the king will arrive soon.

Scene 6

As they march through the north of France, the prime minister remarks that the army's route near to Crecy follows that of King Edward III. The prime minister criticises the King's economic policy (the crown and the queen have been pawned) and his adventurism, fearing a repeat of the Hundred Years War. The King points out France's allies in the forest – the King of Bohemia and mercenary Genoese crossbowmen, singing as they march on Crecy.

Scene 7

Battle of Crécy. When he sees that the Genoese are in his own army's way, the French king orders their slaughter. The battle is won thanks to a blast from the English parliamentary cannon fired by the prime minister.

Scene 8

Now dead, the Genoese and the King of Bohemia march to Paris. An English archer drunkenly drags in a French prisoner whom he leaves with the Carolines and Annes for them to look after. The prime minister proposes setting off for Paris, but the King prefers as target the fortified city of Calais.

Act 3

Scene 9

Autumn, with the English laying siege to Calais. When the English archer asks to be discharged so he can go to Paris for the winter, the King orders that his back be flayed and the decommission signed on his skin; when he pleads to retract his request the archer's ears are cut off, and the King threatens even his tongue if he does not keep quiet.

Scene 10

At night, Caroline with the Mane, descending further into madness, cares for the wounded archer, but spurns his advances.

Scene 11

The next morning after a night of vivid dreams: the King shows increasing interest in the Nice Caroline, while the archer has spent the night shackled to the Caroline with the Mane. As the two Annes argue, the King's angers boils over: power is making him ruthless and miserable. The girls attempt to calm him; the Nice Caroline sings of woman's role as life giver and preserver.

Scene 12

The young prime minister has inherited the office from his father and presents his secretary, and chronicler, Froissart. The frail and weak have been sent out of Calais and they cry out as they starve in the moat. The King promises that he will spare them and the town if six burghers plead for mercy from him, barefoot and only wearing their shirts.

Scene 13

Enough money has been found to redeem the Queen from the pawnbroker for the King's birthday; the ladies dress themselves. The Queen enters and the guide announces the surrender of Calais; six burghers arrive before the royal party. Accusing the peasants of treachery, they show the King the English archer's severed head. The King orders their death, but after Caroline with the Mane and the Queen beg him to relent he makes the burghers members of the War Tribunal.

The King wants to conquer Paris, imprison the French king and then march south for the new wine. He tells the Nice Caroline that he loves her. The king accuses the King of France of having broken the law of war by attacking in the rain when the bowstrings of the English archers were too slack. As the king calls for the French king's back to be flayed, the English archer sings the praises of his judgment. The march south starts with enthusiasm, and the wings of cranes are heard flying northwards. A storm breaks but the group continue into a gale. Froissart asks the king to read his story, but is rebuffed: the king has had no part in History – it was shaped by Time.
