= Aulis Sallinen =

Finnish composer of contemporary classical music

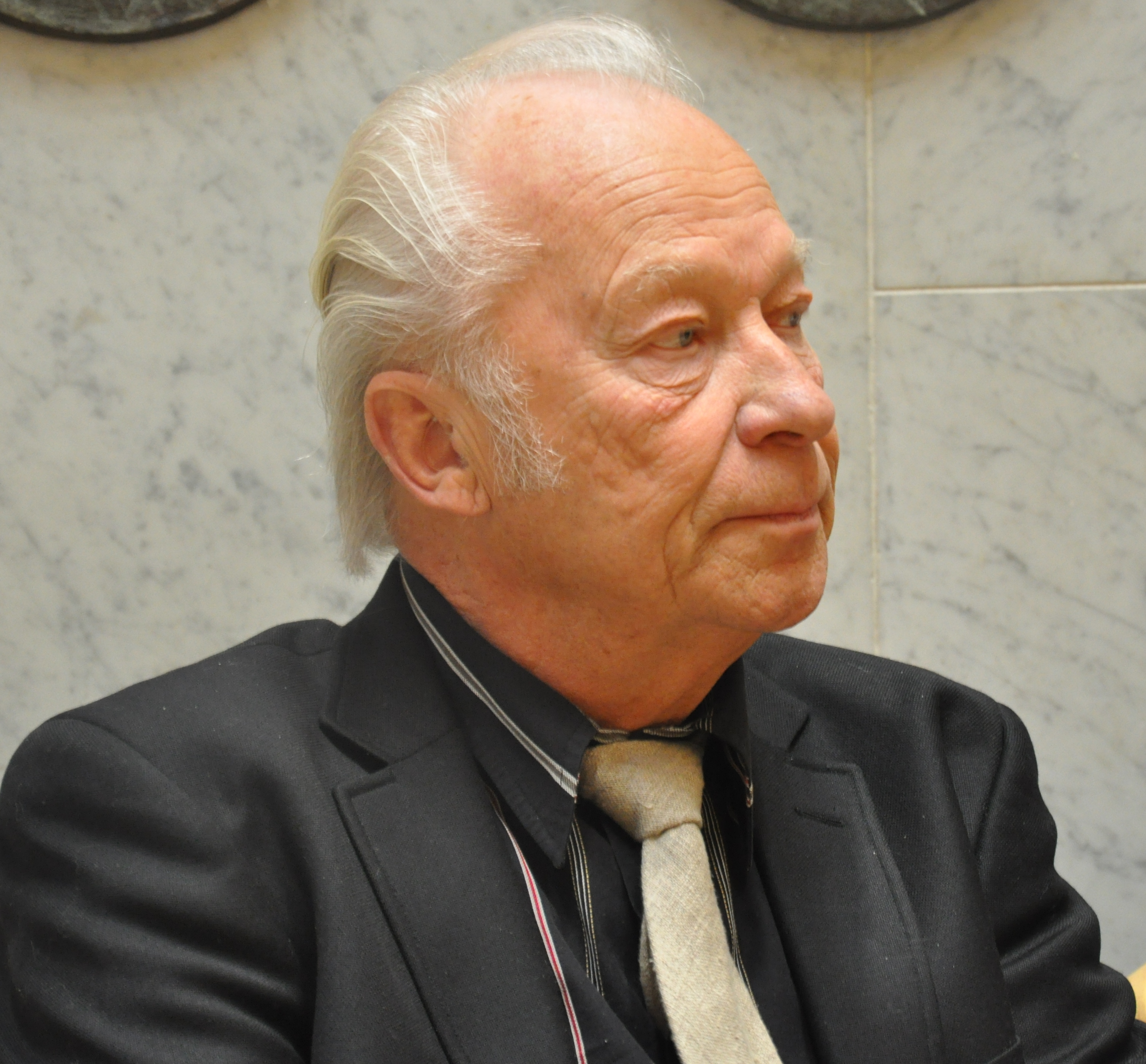
- Aulis Sallinen at the Academic Bookstore in Helsinki, Finland, in 2009
- Born: Aulis Heikki Sallinen; 9 April 1935 (age 91); Salmi, Finland
- Occupation: composer
- Known for: symphonies opera
- Notable work: Operas Ratsumies (The Horseman) and Punainen viiva (The Red Line)

Aulis Heikki Sallinen (born 9 April 1935) is a Finnish contemporary classical music composer. His music has been variously described as "remorselessly harsh", a "beautifully crafted amalgam of several 20th-century styles", and "neo-romantic". Sallinen studied at the Sibelius Academy, where his teachers included Joonas Kokkonen. He has had works commissioned by the Kronos Quartet, and has also written seven operas, eight symphonies, concertos for violin, cello, flute, horn, and English horn, as well as several chamber works. He won the Nordic Council Music Prize in 1978 for his opera Ratsumies (The Horseman).

== Childhood and studies ==
Sallinen was born in Salmi. During his childhood the family moved several times for his father's work, and during the Evacuation of Finnish Karelia in 1944 the family relocated to Uusikaupunki, where he went to school.

His first instruments were the violin and the piano. He learned to play both jazz and classical music. He spent much time during his teenage years improvising. After a while, he began writing his ideas down on paper and began serious composition. He attended the Sibelius Academy of Music and studied with a number of teachers such as Aarre Merikanto and Joonas Kokkonen.

== Early career and operas ==
After graduating, Sallinen took a position as composition teacher at the Sibelius Academy and continued composing. Among his pupils were Jouni Kaipainen and the Austrian-born Finnish composer Herman Rechberger.

Sallinen was appointed as the general manager of the Finnish Radio Symphony Orchestra in 1960 and held the position until 1969. He was the chairman of the board of the Society of Finnish Composers between 1971 and 1974. Though he was a known teacher and was on many boards of directors, his compositions were not particularly noted until 1976, when he was made "Artist Professor" by the Finnish government, allowing him to concentrate on composing.

Sallinen's first opera, Ratsumies, known in English as The Horseman, premiered at the Savonlinna Opera Festival in 1975. His second opera, Punainen viiva (The Red Line), was commissioned by the Finnish National Opera. Sallinen's next opera, Kuningas lähtee Ranskaan (The King Goes Forth to France), was a joint commission by Covent Garden and the Finnish National Opera.

== Later life ==
After he received his lifelong "artist professorship", Sallinen devoted most of his time to composing. He has received a number of commissions and has composed eight symphonies, including one using material from a proposed ballet based on The Lord of the Rings and containing two mediaeval Finnish tunes from the Piae Cantiones. He has written seven operas and also composed the title track of the Kronos Quartet's album Winter Was Hard.

== Career highlights ==
- 1960 – awarded diploma from the Sibelius Academy
- 1960–1970 – was administrator of the Finnish Radio Symphony Orchestra
- 1978 – awarded the Nordic Council Music Prize for The Horseman
- 1981 – became the first person to be made a professor of Arts for life by the Finnish Government, enabling him to concentrate on composing full-time
- 1983 – awarded the Wihuri Sibelius Prize
- 2004 – released the first in a series of recordings of complete orchestral music on the CPO label

== Selected works ==
=== Operas ===
- The Horseman, Op. 32 (1974, Finnish: Ratsumies; Swedish: Ryttaren)
- The Red Line, Op. 46 (1978)
- The King Goes Forth to France, Op. 53 (1983, Finnish: Kuningas lähtee Ranskaan)
- Kullervo, Op. 61 (1988)
- The Palace, Op. 68 (1991–1993, Finnish: Palatsi)
- King Lear, Op. 76 (1999)

=== Symphonies ===
- Symphony No. 1, Op. 24 (1970–71)
- Symphony No. 2, Symphonic Dialogue, for percussionist and orchestra, Op. 29 (1972)
- Symphony No. 3, Op. 35 (1974–75)
- Symphony No. 4, Op. 49 (1978–79)
- Symphony No. 5, Washington Mosaics, Op. 57 (1984–85, r. 1987)
- Symphony No. 6, From a New Zealand Diary, Op. 65 (1989–90)
- Symphony No. 7, The Dreams of Gandalf, Op. 71 (1996)
- Symphony No. 8, Autumnal Fragments, Op. 81 (2001)

=== Orchestral ===
- Two Mythical Scenes, Op. 1 (1956)
- Variations for Cello and Orchestra, Op. 5 (1961–62)
- Mauermusik, Op. 7 (1963)
- Variations for Orchestra, Op. 8 (1963)
- Chorali for wind orchestra, Op. 22 (1970)
- Chamber Music I, for string orchestra, Op. 38 (1975)
- Chamber Music II, for alto flute and string orchestra Op. 41 (1976)
- Dies Irae, for soprano, bass, male choir and orchestra, Op. 47 (1978)
- Shadows, prelude for orchestra, Op. 52 (1982)
- Chamber Music III, The Nocturnal Dances of Don Juanquixote, for cello and string orchestra, Op. 58 (1985–86)
- Sunrise Serenade, Op. 63 (1989)
- Songs of Life and Death, for baritone, choir and orchestra, Op. 69 (1995)
- Palace Rhapsody for wind orchestra, Op. 72 (1996)
- Introduction and Tango Overture, for piano and string orchestra, Op. 74b (1997)
- A Solemn Overture (King Lear), Op. 75 (1997)
- Chamber Music IV, Metamorphoses of Elegy for Sebastian Knight, for piano and string orchestra, Op. 79 (2000)
- Chamber Music V, Barabbas Variations, for accordion (or piano) and string orchestra, Op. 80 (2000)
- Chamber Music VI, 3 invitations au voyage, for string quartet and string orchestra, Op. 88 (2006)
- Chamber Music VII, Cruseliana, for wind quintet and string orchestra, Op. 93 (2007)
- Chamber Music VIII, The Trees, All Their Green (Paavo Haavikko in memoriam), for cello and string orchestra, Op. 94 (2008)
- Chamber Music X, for violin, harp and string orchestra, Op. 114 (2018)
- From the shadows of old songs (Rhapsody for Orchestra), Op. 121b (2023–24)
- Chamber Music XI, for piano and string orchestra, Op. 128 (2026)

=== Concertos ===
- Violin Concerto, Op. 18 (1968)
- Cello Concerto, Op. 44 (1977)
- Flute Concerto, Harlequin, Op. 70 (1995)
- Horn Concerto, Campane ed Arie, Op. 82 (2002)
- Chamber Concerto, for violin, piano, and string orchestra, Op. 87 (2005)
- Concerto for Clarinet, Viola, and Chamber Orchestra, Op. 91 (2007) (also for clarinet, cello, and chamber orchestra, Op. 91a)
- English Horn Concerto, Op. 97 (2010–11)
- Concerto for two accordions, string orchestra and percussion, Op. 115 (2018-19)
- Fasakura for bassoon and small orchestra, Op. 124 (2025)

=== Chamber music ===
- String Quartet No. 1, Op. 2 (1958)
- String Quartet No. 2 Canzona, Op. 4 (1960)
- Serenade for two wind quartets, Op. 9 (1963)
- Quattro per quattro, Op. 12 (1965)
- String Quartet No. 3 Some Aspects of Peltoniemi Hintrik's Funeral March, Op. 19 (1969)
- Four Etudes for violin & piano, Op.21 (1970)
- String Quartet No. 4 Quiet Songs, Op. 25 (1971)
- Sonata for Solo Cello, Op. 26 (1971)
- Metamorphora, for cello & piano, Op. 34 (1974)
- String Quartet No. 5 Pieces of Mosaic, Op. 54 (1983)
- From a Swan Song, for cello & piano, Op. 67 (1991)
- Barabbus Dialogues, for vocalists, narrator & chamber ensemble, Op. 84 (2003/2023)
- Piano Quintet ...des morceaux oublies, Op. 85 (2004)
- Cello Sonata, Op. 86 (2004)
- Windy Winter in Provence for Tenor, Piano, Violin & Guitar, Op. 89 (2006)
- Mistral Music for Solo Flute, Op. 90 (2005) (also for flute & string quartet, Op. 90a)
- Piano Quintet No. 2 Three Kullervo Elegies, Op. 92 (2006)
- Preludes and Fugues for Solo Accordion, Op. 95 (2009)
- Piano Trio Les Visions Fugitives, Op. 96 (2010)
- "Die Virtuose Tafelmusik von Don Juanquijote" for Accordion & Cello, Op. 98 (2011)
- "...memories, memories..." for Children's Choir, Piano & Strings, Op. 99 (2011)
- Five Portraits of Women for Soprano, Horn & Chamber Orchestra, Op. 100 (2012)
- Baumgesang mit Epilog for Cello & Piano, Op. 101 (2013)
- Three Adagios for Organ, Op. 102 (2013)
- String Quartet No. 6, Op. 103 (2014)
- Variazioni per organo, Op. 104 (2014)
- Canti per Vallis Gratiae for Piano & Organ, Op. 105 (2014)
- 8 Miniatures for Piano, Op. 110 (2017)
- Sonata per quattro violoncelli, Op. 116 (2019)
- Nine fragments for Barabbas Septetto, Op. 118 (2021–22)
- Duo per due for violin and cello (2023)
- Ritorno for Organ, Op. 122 (2024)
- String Quartet No. 7 Abschied, Op. 125 (2025)

=== Vocal and choral ===
- Suita grammaticale, for children's choir and orchestra (1971)
- Songs from the Sea, Op. 33 for unaccompanied children's choir, based on Finnish folk songs and a poem by the composer's two sons
- Dies Irae, for soprano, bass, male choir and orchestra, Op. 47 (1978)
- Song Around a Song, Op. 50 (1980) – Four folk songs in Italian, Japanese, Finnish, and English for unaccompanied children's choir
- The Iron Age Suite, Op. 55, arranged from music for Finnish TV series based on the Kalevala
- The Beaufort Scale, Op. 56 (1984), humoresque for unaccompanied choir, based on the wind velocity scale
- Linna vedessä (The Castle in the Water), Op. 106 (2014–16), a chronicle for a narrator, four singers and a chamber orchestra
- Chamber Music IX, Nocturne, Op. 112 (2017), for voice and string orchestra
