= Paavo Berglund =

Finnish conductor and violinist

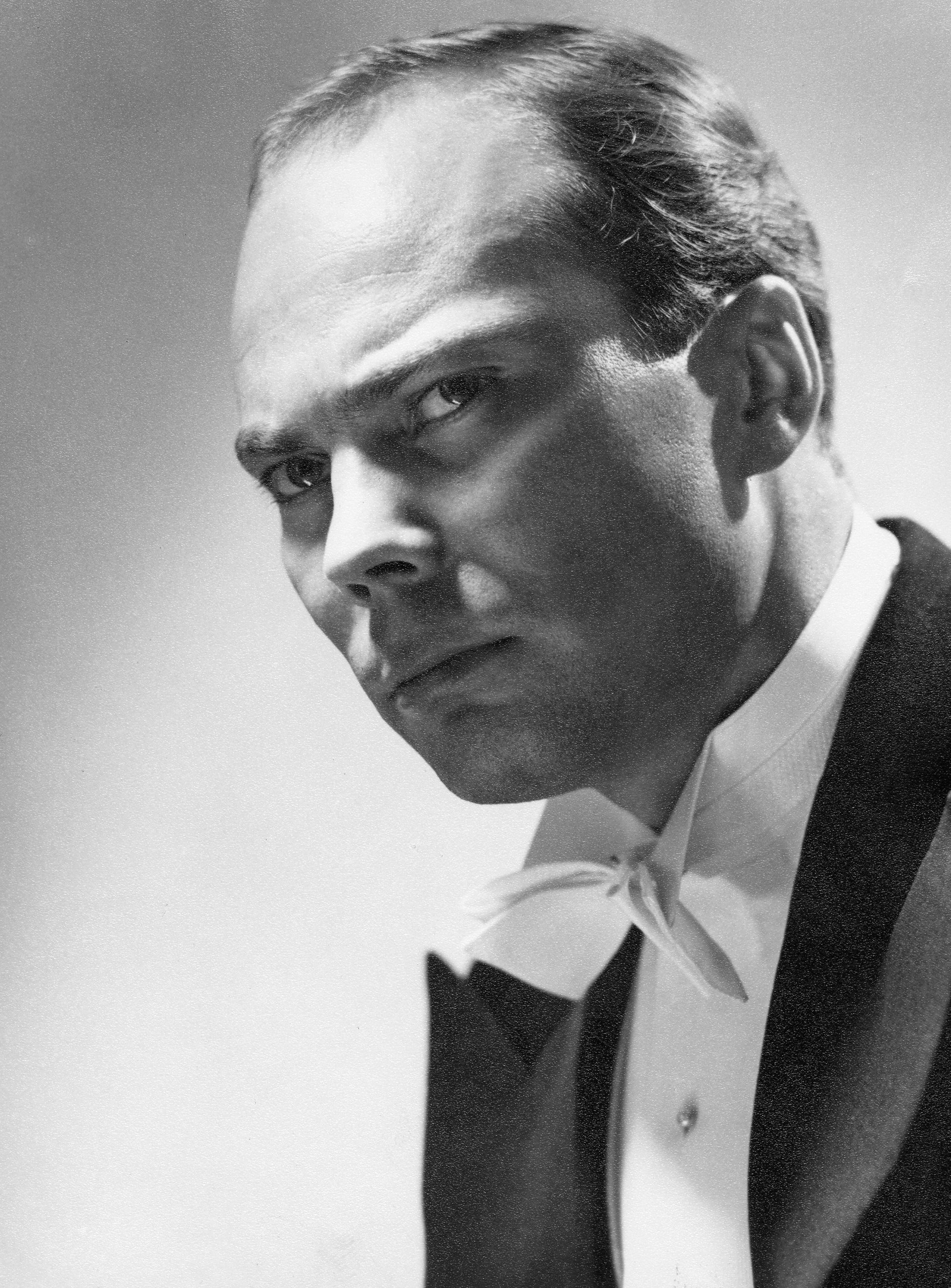
The Finnish conductor Paavo Berglund (c. 1960s)

Paavo Allan Engelbert Berglund OBE (14 April 1929 – 25 January 2012) was a Finnish conductor and violinist.

== Career ==
Born in Helsinki, Berglund studied the violin as a child, and played an instrument made by his grandfather. By age 15, he had decided on music as his career, and by 18 was playing in restaurants.

During the Second World War, Berglund worked at the iron factories in Billnäs. Children were moved out of Helsinki during heavy stages of the war. His professional career as a violinist began in 1946, playing the whole summer at the officers' mess (Upseerikasino) in Helsinki. He had already played in dance orchestras in 1945. Formal study took place in Helsinki at the Sibelius Academy, in Vienna and in Salzburg. He was a violinist in the Finnish Radio Symphony Orchestra from 1949 to 1958 in the 1st violin section, unique among the instrumentalists in being accommodated for seating to account for the fact that he played the violin 'left-handed'.

In a radio interview made of the Finnish Broadcasting Company YLE in 2002, Berglund explains how he heard the Vienna Philharmonic Orchestra on their tour in Helsinki with Wilhelm Furtwängler and was very impressed. Shortly after that he left for Vienna to study. He had many friends both in the Vienna Philharmonic and Vienna Radio Symphony orchestras, and could attend rehearsal and recording sessions. One particular recording session he remembers is when he was present one evening when Furtwängler recorded Schumann's Manfred Overture and Smetana's Die Moldau (Vltava) at the Musikverein in Vienna. Another conductor that he was very impressed with was Hans Knappertsbusch.

Berglund's conducting career began in 1949, when he founded his own chamber orchestra. In 1953, Berglund co-founded the Helsinki Chamber Orchestra (partly inspired by the Boyd Neel Orchestra).

In 1955, he was appointed Associate Conductor of the Finnish Radio Symphony Orchestra, and served as chief conductor of the Finnish Radio Symphony Orchestra from 1962 to 1971. Berglund became music director of the Helsinki Philharmonic Orchestra in 1975 and held the post for four seasons. He was conductor of the mixed voice choir of the Student Union of the University of Helsinki, The Academic Choral Society (Akateeminen Laulu) from 1959–61.

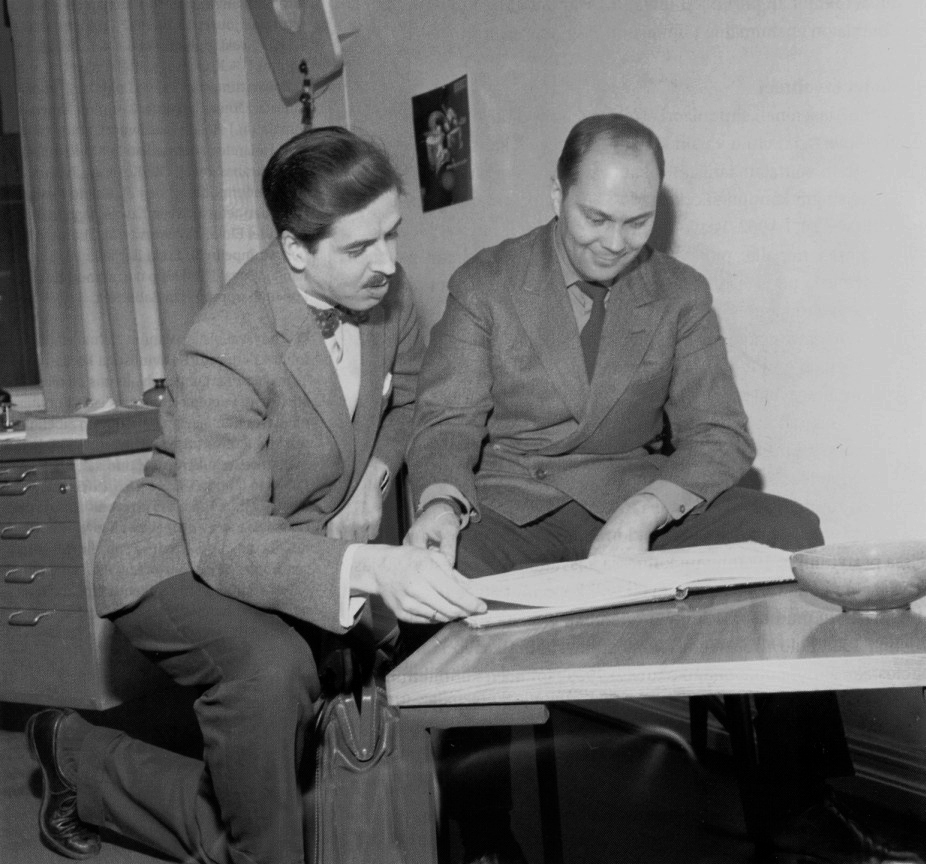
Berglund (right) with the violinist Heikki Louhivuori of the Finnish Radio Symphony Orchestra

Berglund attained notoriety as a strict orchestral disciplinarian due to his ruthless rehearsals and dedication to musical perfection. As a conductor Berglund often went beyond the printed score in the music of Jean Sibelius and others to improve on what he believed were weaknesses, especially in orchestration, colour and balance.

Most orchestras he conducted responded well to his no-nonsense approach. He was tireless in studying, preparing and rehearsing. He almost always came to the orchestra with his own materials he had corrected and bowed by his own hand. He would then mark highly detailed instructions on the sheet music of each individual musician.

Berglund would certainly not always agree with composers; he felt comfortable in elaborating any nuances he considered important but which the composers had not highlighted. He believed in details: "I think we have already had our fill of mushy recordings", Berglund noted in an interview by Finnish Music Quarterly (FMQ) in 1999.

In the UK, Berglund led Sibelius Centenary Concerts with the Bournemouth Symphony Orchestra in 1965, and became their principal conductor in 1972, concluding his tenure in Bournemouth in 1979. He significantly raised its performing standards, as can be heard from the many recordings made by it for EMI during this period. He also served as principal guest conductor of the Scottish National Orchestra, from 1981–85.

Berglund resigned from both the Helsinki and Bournemouth orchestras in 1979. More noticed in his native Finland was that he had seemed to give up his dictatorial ways. In 1996, he was quoted as saying, "The rise in the standard of Finnish orchestras has been quite incredible...young musicians play so much better than their predecessors did."

Guest engagements saw him conducting all the major North American and European orchestras, such as the Berlin Philharmonic Orchestra, the London Symphony Orchestra, the Dresden Staatskapelle, the St Petersburg and Moscow Philharmonics, the Leipzig Gewandhaus and the Israel Philharmonic Orchestras.

Berglund was a member of the Russian National Orchestra's conductor collegium.

He made his New York debut in 1978 with the American Symphony Orchestra at the Carnegie Hall, in a concert of Shostakovich and Sibelius. From the 1990s he became a regular guest conductor in the New York Philharmonic and the Cleveland Orchestra.

Berglund made over 100 recordings. In an interview for the newspaper Helsingin Sanomat in 2009, he said when asked about his recordings, that the Smetana recording with the Dresden Staatskapelle is probably the best, since this was the best of the orchestras that he made recordings with.

Berglund conducted opera a few times. The most important of his opera projects were Beethoven's Fidelio with Finnish National Opera in Helsinki in 2000 (with Karita Mattila, Matti Salminen, Jaakko Ryhänen) and Nielsen's Maskerade in Copenhagen.

Paavo Berglund told in a radio interview for the conductor Atso Almila, made on occasion for the 75th anniversary in 2002 of the Finnish Radio Symphony Orchestra, that he had the closest relation and friendship of contemporary Finnish composers to Joonas Kokkonen (1921–1996). The collaboration was very strong. He championed his music as much as possible and also helped him during the difficult times in life. He commissioned many of Kokkonen's works.

Berglund was also the first conductor in the early years, alongside Jukka-Pekka Saraste, for the Finnish Chamber Orchestra founded in 1990. This particular orchestra did not serve as a primary job for anyone, but was rather an instrument to gather top musicians to work together in an ensemble where art and quality come before routine.

The orchestra consists of concertmasters and principals from leading Finnish orchestras such as the Finnish Radio Symphony Orchestra, Helsinki Philharmonic Orchestra, Orchestra of the Finnish National Opera, Tapiola Sinfonietta, Avanti! and Lahti Symphony Orchestra. Berglund also conducted the Sibelius Academy Symphony Orchestra on a few occasions.

== Relationship with Jean Sibelius' music ==
Berglund was particularly associated with the music of Sibelius and he recorded the complete Sibelius symphonies three times.

During the mid-1950s, Jean Sibelius heard Berglund conduct some of the symphonies and the Suite Rakastava, and told Berglund how much he had enjoyed the performances. He met Sibelius at his home Ainola as a member of the delegation of the Radio Orchestra that visited Sibelius. Sibelius asked him whether they were playing any Schönberg. To this Paavo Berglund answered no. This was the whole conversation. Berglund made the first recording of the Kullervo Symphony.

Berglund's source-critical research on the Sibelius Seventh Symphony began in 1957, when he conducted the Seventh with the Helsinki Philharmonic Orchestra, and noticed that they were playing from parts that Sibelius had corrected. He saw that the printed parts had numerous errors. His subsequent research led to the publication of a new edition of the symphony by Hansen in 1980.

In an interview in 1998 with the London Sunday Times, Berglund spoke of his interpretative ideas on the music of Jean Sibelius:

"Sibelius's music is often ruined because it's too strictly accurate. I think maybe musicians like to play like this" – he makes a series of downward vertical gestures – "but it's good to do it like this" – his hands, one above the other, oscillate gently in and out of vertical alignment. "Accuracy against atmosphere: it's not that simple. The early Sibelius conductor Georg Schneevoigt once complained that he couldn't get the details out of Sibelius's scores. Sibelius said that he should simply swim in the gravy."

Berglund sometimes courted controversy with his re-touching of orchestral parts; as he said in a Gramophone interview in October 1978, "Sibelius was a superb orchestrator, but right up to the very end he made strange dynamics which I find I have to change. In the Second Symphony you don't have to alter so much, but funnily enough there is a lot that needs altering in the Seventh Symphony ... My attitude was "werktreu" which in German means roughly 'be true to the work'. But you see, the composers didn't always know; they could have given it more thought. Bruckner, when things were suggested to him by Lowe and Schalk (who were certainly not stupid) told them to go ahead and do it. Maybe he was weak and should have argued sometimes a little bit more, but on the other hand many of their suggestions are fine."

He collaborated with the Chamber Orchestra of Europe in recordings of the complete symphonies of Jean Sibelius and Johannes Brahms. The origin for the Sibelius recordings were made when Berglund conducted the orchestra at the Edinburgh Festival in a complete cycle of the Sibelius symphonies. What was especially notable was using smaller string forces than usual in some of the symphonies. The result was highly praised.

Berglund's early Sibelius interpretations are darker and heavier. Later on he discovered a new style. While other conductors often go for the big effects in Sibelius, Berglund started to love the clarity that could be achieved with an orchestra of about 50 players.

Berglund was one of the jury members in the 1st International Sibelius Conductors' Competition held in 1995.

== Last performance ==
Paavo Berglund conducted his last concert in the Pleyel Concert Hall in Paris on 1 June 2007. The orchestra was the French Radio Philharmonic Orchestra. The program included the Brahms Violin Concerto with Christian Tetzlaff as a soloist and Sibelius' Symphony No. 4.

In an interview made on his 80th birthday by the Finnish Broadcasting Company YLE, Berglund said that the playing in the Sibelius was almost perfect Sibelius playing. The concert was recorded by French Radio.

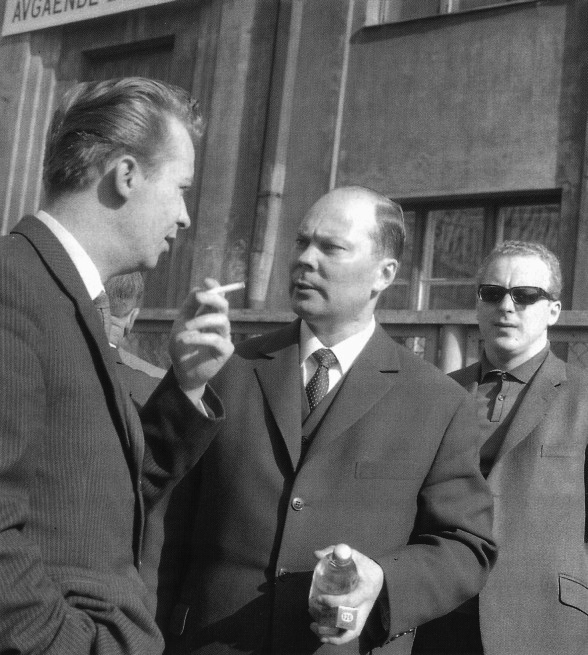
Waiting for the train to Leningrad in 1963: from left to right, intendant Aulis Sallinen, conductor Berglund, violinist Pertti Kiri

== Death and legacy ==
Berglund died on 25 January 2012, aged 82, and was buried in Helsinki on 4 February 2012. He was survived by his wife, Kirsti; son, Juha; daughters, Liisa Kylmänen and Eeva Berglund; and five grandchildren.

The Finnish newspaper Helsingin Sanomat interviewed the conductor Kurt Masur by telephone from Leipzig on occasion of the passing of Berglund. "Paavo was one of my oldest friends. The world has lost one of its greatest conductors, and my thoughts are with his wife Kirsti and his family", said Mr Masur.

== Selected instruments ==
In 2005, the Signe and Ane Gyllenberg Foundation bought a violin from Mr Berglund, which was built in 1732 by Carlo Bergonzi (1683–1747). Before him the violin was owned by Isaac Stern. Violin maker Ilkka Vainio has said that the violin is an example of a masterpiece, the best he has personally known. The violin has maintained its original condition, even the lacquer is still mostly intact. According to Petteri Iivonen, who has played the instrument, the violin has a warm sound yet can endure even a rougher style of play. The violin is lent to a musician for three years at a time. The first was Pietari Inkinen who had the violin during years 2005 to 2009.

In spring 2009, the violin was handed over to Petteri Iivonen. The foundation lends the violin by announcing it on the daily newspapers, musical publications and on its website. Interested musicians may apply to enjoy the violin for the said period of time. A knowledgeable jury decides on the musician who will have the violin.

According to the Finnish Broadcasting Company YLE, Berglund's Stradivarius violin was sold by his heirs in 2012 to the Finnish Cultural Foundation for 1.8 million euros. At the same time the performing artist's rights to Berglund's recordings as well as his valuable collection of orchestral sheet music were donated to the foundation. The latter material will be made available to researchers in ten years' time. The violin will be named Stradivarius ex. Berglund. Mr Berglund's son Juha Berglund, the spokesperson for the family, says that his father had several instruments, but the Stradivari was the dearest to him. Mr Berglund's specific wish was that the violin should stay in Finland. The violin was built in around 1700. The violin is in exceptionally good condition for its age.

== Awards and honours ==
- Grammy nomination in 1971 for Best Choral Performance — Classical for Sibelius: Kullervo
- Diapason d'Or for the recording of the Nielsen Symphonies with the Royal Danish Orchestra.
- Diapason d'Or for the recording of the Sibelius Symphonies with the Chamber Orchestra of Europe.
- "Choc de l'Année 1998" of Le Monde de la musique, for the recording of the Sibelius Symphonies with the Chamber Orchestra of Europe.
- Finnish State Music Award (with Arto Noras) in 1972.
- Art Council of the Uusimaa (region in southern Finland) Region Artium Cultori Award in 2004.
- Janne Award in category Best Orchestral Recording in year 2001 for Brahms Symphonies with the Chamber Orchestra of Europe. The price is given by IFPI Finland (The Finnish National Group of IFPI, in Finnish Musiikkituottajat).
- Pro Finlandia Medal 1982.
- Finnish Cultural Foundation Award in 1985 (40.000 FIM).
- Honorary Officer of the Order of the British Empire (OBE) in 1977.
- Honorary Conductor of the Turku Philharmonic Orchestra in 2002
- Member No. 1202 of the Royal Swedish Academy of Music in 1983
- The Rehearsal Hall PAAVO at the Helsinki Music Centre, opened in 2011, is named after Paavo Berglund

== Selected discography ==
- Misc.: Opera arias: Bizet, Carmen: Song of Toreador; Mozart, Marriage of Figaro: Aria of Figaro, "Non piu andrai"; Verdi, Aida: Radames!; (with Aarne Vainio). Finnish Radio Symphony Orchestra. (FUGA 9200)
- Misc.: Tribute to Martti Talvela. Finnish Radio Symphony Orchestra. (Ondine ODE 945-2)
- Beethoven: Piano Concerto No. 4 (with Maire Halava). Finnish Radio Symphony Orchestra. 1961. (Finlandia Classics, FINCLA 23)
- Bliss: Suite from Miracle in the Gorbals; Cello Concerto (with Arto Noras). Bournemouth Symphony Orchestra. 1977, Southampton Guildhall. (EMI ASD 3342)
- Brahms: Alto Rhapsody (with Maiju Kuusoja). Finnish Radio Symphony Orchestra. 1961. (Finlandia Classics, FINCLA 26)
- Brahms: Alto Rhapsody (with Heljä Angervo). Finnish Radio Symphony Orchestra. 1967. (Finlandia Classics, FINCLA 20)
- Brahms: Complete Symphonies. Chamber Orchestra of Europe. Live May 2000, Baden-Baden Festival Hall. (Ondine ODE 990-2T)
- Brahms: Double Concerto (with Yehudi Menuhin and Paul Tortelier). London Philharmonic Orchestra. 1984. (EMI)
- Brahms: Piano Concerto No. 2 (with François-Frederic Guy). London Philharmonic Orchestra. Live May 31, 2003, Royal Festival Hall, London. (NAÏVE V4944)
- Britten: Violin Concerto (with Ida Haendel). Bournemouth Symphony Orchestra. June 12, 1977. (EMI ASD 3843 CDM7642022)
- Bruch: Violin Concerto No. 1 (with Frank Peter Zimmermann). Royal Philharmonic Orchestra. 2004 (SONY)
- Dvorak: Scherzo Capriccioso; Slavonic Rhapsody No. 3. Dresden Staatskapelle. Recorded 1978 at Lukaskirche Dresden. (ETERNA 8 27 199–200)
- Englund: Epinikia. Helsinki Philharmonic Orchestra. (FINNLEVY SFX 34)
- Franck: Symphony; Symphonic Variations (with Sylvia Kersenbaum). Bournemouth Symphony Orchestra. 1976. (EMI ASD 3308)
- Glazunov: Piano Concerto (with John Ogdon); Yardumian: Passacaglia, Recitative & Fugue. Bournemouth Symphony Orchestra. 1977. (EMI ASD 3367)
- Grieg: Peer Gynt Suite; Alfven: Swedish Rhapsody; Järnefelt: Praeludium; Berceuse. Bournemouth Symphony Orchestra. (EMI)
- Grieg: Symphonic Dances; Old Norwegian Romance with Variations. Bournemouth Symphony Orchestra. 1982. (EMI ASD 4170)
- Haydn: Symphony Nos. 92, 99. Finnish Chamber Orchestra. November 1992, Hyvinkää Hall, Finland. (Ondine)
- Haydn: Symphony No. 103; Tchaikovsky: Serenade for Strings. Finnish Chamber Orchestra. Live 1993. (FCO 1003)
- Kokkonen: Music for String Orchestra. Helsinki Chamber Orchestra. (Fennica SS 8)
- Kokkonen: Symphonies 1, 4; "...durch einen spiegel...". Finnish RSO. May 1995 (...Durch einen..., Symph. 4). March 1995 (Symph. 1). House of Culture Helsinki. (Ondine)
- Kokkonen: Symphony No. 3; Sibelius: Tapiola. Finnish RSO. (EMI SXL 6432, Finlandia FA 311)
- Merikanto: Ekho; Violin Concerto no. 2 (with Ulf Hästbacka). Finnish Radio Symphony Orchestra. 1978. (Fennica Nova)
- Mozart: Oboe Concerto; Strauss: Oboe Concerto (with Douglas Boyd). Chamber Orchestra of Europe. (Asv Living Era)
- Mozart: Violin Concertos Nos. 3, 5 (with Mayumi Fujikawa). The Japan Philharmonic Symphony Orchestra. (EMI La Voix de son Maitre 2C 065-93594)
- Nielsen: Symphony No. 5. Bournemouth Symphony Orchestra. 1975. (EMI ASD 3063)
- Nielsen: Symphonies 1–6. Royal Danish Orchestra. June 3, 4, 5, 1987 (Nos. 1, 4). August 17–19, 1989 (Nos. 3, 6). August 15–18, 1988 (Nos. 2, 5). Odd Fellow Hall, Copenhagen. (RCA Victor)
- Palmgren: Piano Concerto No. 4 "April" (with France Ellegaard). 1966. Finnish Radio Symphony Orchestra. (Danacord)
- Prokofiev: Summer Night Suite. Bournemouth Symphony Orchestra. 1975. (EMI ASD 3141)
- Rachmaninov: Piano Concerto No. 3 (with Leif Ove Andsnes). Oslo Philharmonic. Live March 1995, Oslo Philharmonic Hall. (EMI)
- Rachmaninov: Symphony No. 3 "The Rock". Stockholm Philharmonic. June 20–22, 1988, Philharmonic Hall, Stockholm. (RCA Victor)
- Raitio: Moon in Jupiter; Moonlight Alley. Finnish RSO. (Fennica Nova)
- Rimsky-Korsakov: The Golden Cockerel Suite. Bournemouth Symphony Orchestra. 1975. (EMI ASD 3141)
- Rimsky-Korsakov: May Night Overture; Glazunov: Valse de Concert No. 1; Glinka: Valse Fantaisie; Sibelius: Intermezzo and Alla Marcia from Karelia Suite; Shalaster: Dance "Liana". Bournemouth Symphony Orchestra. (EMI)
- Saint-Saens: Piano Concerto No. 2 (with Emil Gilels). USSR State Symphony Orchestra. December 1951. (Yedang, 2002. YCC-0066)
- Schumann: Piano Concerto; Grieg: Piano Concerto (with John Ogdon). New Philharmonia Orchestra. 1972. (EMI ASD 2802)
- Sallinen: Chorali. Helsinki Philharmonic Orchestra. (BIS CD-41)
- Salmenhaara: Symphony No. 2. Finnish Radio Symphony Orchestra. 1966. (Finlandia Classics, FINCLA 27)
- Shostakovich: Symphonies 5, 6, 7, 10, 11. Bournemouth Symphony Orchestra. 30–31 July 1975, No. 1 Studio, Abbey Road, London (No. 5). Jan 1974, Guildhall, Southampton (No. 7). 1975 (No. 10). Dec 1978 (No. 11). (EMI)
- Shostakovich: Symphony No. 8. Russian National Orchestra. June 2005, DZZ Studio 5, Moscow. (Pentatone)
- Shostakovich: Cello Concerto No. 1; Walton: Cello Concerto (with Paul Tortelier). Bournemouth Symphony Orchestra. January 7–8, 1973, Southampton Guildhall. (EMI)
- Shostakovich: Concerto No. 1 for Piano, Trumpet and Strings (with Cristina Ortiz and Rodney Senior); Piano Concerto No. 2 (with Cristina Ortiz); Three Fantastic Dances. Bournemouth Symphony Orchestra. Sep 1975. (EMI)
- Shostakovich: Violin Concerto No. 1 (with Arve Tellefsen). Royal Philharmonic Orchestra. (Grappa, Simax)
- Shostakovich: Violin Concerto No. 1; Bruch: Violin Concerto no. 1 (with Alena Baeva). Russian National Orchestra. June 2005. (Sotheby's)
- Sibelius: From Kullervo; Kullervon valitus (with Usko Viitanen). Finnish Radio Symphony Orchestra. (FUGA 9240)
- Sibelius: En saga; The Oceanides; Pohjola's Daughter; Luonnotar (with Taru Valjakka); Pelleas et Melisande (excerpts). Bournemouth Symphony Orchestra. (EMI ESD7159)
- Sibelius: Pelleas et Melisande; Rakastava. Finnish Chamber Orchestra. Live Tampere Talo, 8 April 1991. (FCO 1001)
- Sibelius: Finlandia; Tapiola; The Swan of Tuonela; Lemminkäinen's Return; Valse Triste. Philharmonia Orchestra. 1983, St. John's Smith Square, London. (EMI ASD 4186)
- Sibelius: Finlandia; The Swan of Tuonela; Lemminkäinen's return; Intermezzo from Karelia Suite; Nocturne, Elegie, Musette, Valse Triste from King Kristian II suite. Bournemouth Symphony Orchestra. (EMI 1 C 063-05 011 Q)
- Sibelius: Symphonies 2, 7. London Philharmonic Orchestra. Live Royal Festival Hall 6 Dec. 2003 (No. 7) and 16 Feb. 2005 (No. 2). (LPO 0005)
- Sibelius: Symphony No. 4. Royal Concertgebouw Orchestra. Live 9/11/1991. (Anthology Of The Royal Concertgebouw Orchestra Vol. 6 – Live Radio Recordings 1990–2000)
- Sibelius: Symphony No. 4; Sallinen: Mauermusik. Finnish RSO. House of Culture Helsinki, May 1969. (DECCA SXL 6431, Finlandia FA 312)
- Sibelius: Symphonies 5, 6; The Swan of Tuonela. London Philharmonic Orchestra. Live May 31, 2003, Royal Festival Hall (No. 5). Live Dec. 6, 2003, Royal Festival Hall (No. 6). Live Sept. 22, 2006, Queen Elizabeth Hall (Swan). (LPO 0065)
- Sibelius: Symphony No. 6; The Swan of Tuonela. Deutsches Symphonie-Orchester Berlin. Recorded 1970. (ETERNA 00031432BC)
- Sibelius: Complete Symphonies 1–7 and Orchestral Works (Including World Premiere Recording of Kullervo Symphony). Bournemouth Symphony Orchestra. 1976 (No. 1). 1978 (No. 2). June 20, 1977 (No. 3). ? (No. 4). June 1973 (No. 5). 1976 (No. 6). 1973 (No. 7). Southampton Guildhall. Dec. 1970, Southampton Guildhall (Kullervo). (EMI)
- Sibelius: Complete Symphonies 1–7 with Finlandia, The Oceanides and Kullervo Symphony. Helsinki Philharmonic Orchestra. Feb 1984, All Saints Church Tooting (No. 4). 1985 (Kullervo). May 1986, House of Culture, Helsinki (No. 1). Dec 1986, House of Culture, Helsinki (No. 2). July 1987, House of Culture, Helsinki (No. 3). Dec 1986, House of Culture, Helsinki (No. 5). May 1986, House of Culture, Helsinki (No. 6). Feb 1984, All Saints Church Tooting (No. 7). (EMI)
- Sibelius: Complete Symphonies 1–7. Chamber Orchestra of Europe. 10 Oct 1997, RFO Hall Hilversum (Nos. 1, 2, 3). Sep 1995, Watford Colosseum London (Nos. 4, 6, 7). Dec 1996, Nijmegen (No. 5). (Finlandia)
- Sibelius: Violin Concerto; Serenades Nos. 1, 2; Humoresque No. 5. (with Ida Haendel). Bournemouth Symphony Orchestra. July 1975, Southampton Guildhall. (EMI)
- Sibelius: Violin Concerto; Six Humoresques for Violin and Orchestra (with Heimo Haitto). Finnish Radio Symphony Orchestra. 1964. (Finlandia Classics, FINCLA 2)
- Sibelius: Violin Concerto (with Arve Tellefsen). Royal Philharmonic Orchestra. (Simax)
- Smetana: Má Vlast. Dresden Staatskapelle. Recorded 1978 at Lukaskirche Dresden. (ETERNA 8 27 199–200)
- Strauss Johann Jr: Csardas, op. 441. Finnish National Opera Orchestra. (Ondine ODE 8152)
- Strauss: Till Eulenspiegel; Don Juan; Burleske for Piano and Orchestra (with Sergei Edelmann); Serenade for Winds. Stockholm Philharmonic. June 19–22, 1989, Philharmonic Hall, Stockholm. (RCA Victor)
- Stravinsky: Concerto for Piano and Wind instruments (with Olli Mustonen); Shostakovich: Symphony No. 8. Berlin Philharmonic Orchestra. Live 2001. (Testament Records SBT21500)
- Stravinsky: Concerto for Piano and Wind instruments (with Olli Mustonen); Rachmaninov; Symphony No. 3 (2nd and 3rd movements). Avanti Chamber Orchestra. Live in Porvoo 27 June-7 July 2001. (AVANTICD-4)
- Tchaikovsky: Serenade for Strings; Dvorak: Serenade for Strings. New Stockholm Chamber Orchestra. July 14–15, 1983, Stockholm Concert Hall. (BIS CD-243)
- Tchaikovsky: 1812 Overture; Symphony No. 4. London Philharmonic Orchestra. February 28, 1998, Watford Colosseum. (SONY)
- Vaughan Williams: Symphony No. 4; The Lark Ascending (with Barry Griffiths). Royal Philharmonic Orchestra. October 29–30, 1979, No. 1 Studio, Abbey Road. (EMI ASD 3904)
- Vaughan Williams: Symphony No. 6; Oboe Concerto (with John Williams). Bournemouth Symphony Orchestra. April 1, 1975, Southampton Guildhall. (EMI ASD 3127)
- Verdi: Scene with Aida and Amonasro (with Lauri Lahtinen). Finnish Radio Symphony Orchestra. (Finlandia Classics 2014. FINCLA10)
- Walton: Violin Concerto (with Ida Haendel). Bournemouth Symphony Orchestra. 1978, Southampton Guildhall. (EMI ASD3843 CDM 764202 2)

== Selected video recordings ==
- Beethoven: Piano Concerto No. 3; Grieg: Piano Concerto (with Emil Gilels). Philharmonia Orchestra (Beethoven). Finnish RSO (Grieg). Live Finlandia Hall Helsinki 1983 and 1984. (VAI DVD DVDVAI4472)
- Sibelius: Complete Symphonies. Chamber Orchestra of Europe. Live Finlandia Hall, 23–25 August 1998, Helsinki. (ICA Classics. ICAD 5162). 2 x DVD.

== Selected published works ==
- A comparative study of the printed score and the manuscript of the seventh symphony of Sibelius. Acta Musica V. Studies Published by Sibelius Museum. Institute of Musicology, Åbo Akademi University, Turku, Finland, 1970. 33 pages.

== Selected first performances ==
- Bergman, Erik: Simbolo Op. 52, 1960. 2232/4330/13/1, celesta, strings. Duration: 11'. — Commissioned by the Finnish Broadcasting Company. Publisher: Edition Wilhelm Hansen. First Performance: Finnish RSO, cond. Paavo Berglund, Helsinki, March 14, 1961.
- Kokkonen, Joonas: Opus sonorum, 1964. 2232/4320, piano, strings. Duration: 12'. — Publisher: Fennica Gehrman. First Performance: Sibelius Centenary Concert, Finnish RSO, cond. Paavo Berglund, Helsinki (Finland), 16 Feb 1965.
- Kokkonen, Joonas: Sinfonisia luonnoksia (Symphonic Sketches), 1968. 3232/4331/12/1, strings. Duration: 14'. — Publisher: Fennica Gehrman. First Performance: Finnish RSO, cond. Paavo Berglund, Helsinki (Finland), 16 May 1968.
- Kokkonen, Joonas: Symphony No. 1, 1960. 3333/4330/10, strings. Duration: 23'. — Publisher: Fennica Gehrman. First Performance: Finnish RSO, cond. Paavo Berglund, Helsinki (Finland), 15 Mar 1960.
- Kokkonen, Joonas: Symphony No. 2, 1961. 3333/4330/10/1, strings. Duration: 22'. — Publisher: Fennica Gehrman. First Performance: Finnish RSO, cond. Paavo Berglund, Helsinki (Finland), 18 April 1961.
- Kokkonen, Joonas: Symphony No. 3, 1967. 4333/4330/00/1, celesta and piano, strings. Duration: 21'. — Publisher: Fennica Gehrman. First Performance: 40th anniversary concert of the Finnish RSO. Finnish RSO, cond. Paavo Berglund, Helsinki (Finland), 12 Sep 1967.
- Kokkonen, Joonas: Symphony No. 4, 1971. 4333/4330/13/1, strings. Duration: 22'. — Commissioned by the Finnish Broadcasting Company. Publisher: G. Schirmer Inc. First Performance: Finnish RSO, cond. Paavo Berglund, Helsinki (Finland), 16 Nov 1971.
- Meriläinen, Usko: Chamber Concerto, 1962. Solo violin, percussion (2 players) and double string orchestra. Duration: 18'. — First Performance: Tuomas Haapanen, violin, Finnish RSO, cond. Paavo Berglund, Helsinki, October 22, 1964.
- Meriläinen, Usko: Suite No. 1 from the ballet Arius, 1960. 3233/4331/12/0, piano, strings. Duration: 21'. — First Performance: Finnish RSO, cond. Paavo Berglund, Helsinki, October 24, 1961.
- Meriläinen, Usko: Symphony No. 2, 1964. 2222/4220/12/1, strings. Duration: 22'. — Commissioned by the Finnish Broadcasting Company. Publisher: Bote & Bock. First Performance: Finnish RSO, cond. Paavo Berglund, Helsinki, November 10, 1964.
- Nordgren, Pehr Henrik: Agnus Dei Op. 15, 1971. Soprano, baritone, mixed choir and orchestra. Texts: Karelian folk poem, pamphlet of the Finnish Association for Nature Conservation. Basho, Einari Vuorela, Lauri Viita and Tu An-shih. Duration: 60'. — Commissioned by the Finnish Broadcasting Company. First Performance: Taru Valjakka, soprano, Matti Lehtinen, baritone, Finnish RSO and Choir, cond. Paavo Berglund, Helsinki, May 11, 1971.
- Rautavaara, Einojuhani: Canto I, 1960. Duration: 6'. — Publisher: Fennica Gehrman. First Performance: Finnish RSO, cond. Paavo Berglund, Helsinki, March 7, 1967.
- Rautavaara, Einojuhani: Concerto for Piano and Orchestra No. 1, 1969. Solo piano + 2020/4220/11, strings. Duration: 21'. — Commissioned by the Finnish Broadcasting Company. Publisher: Breitkopf & Härtel. First Performance: Einojuhani Rautavaara, piano, Finnish RSO, cond. Paavo Berglund, Helsinki Festival, May 29, 1970.
- Rautavaara, Einojuhani: Symphony No. 3, 1961. 2222/2231, 4 Wagner tubas/10, strings. Duration: 33'. — Publisher: Fennica Gehrman. First Performance: Finnish RSO, cond. Paavo Berglund, Helsinki, April 10, 1962.
- Rautavaara, Einojuhani: Symphony No. 4 (original work), 1964/1968. [Withdrawn. Arabescata (1962) named as Symphony no. 4 in 1986]. — First Performance (original version): Helsinki Philharmonic Orchestra, cond. Jorma Panula, Helsinki, February 26, 1956. First Performance (second version): Finnish RSO, cond. Paavo Berglund, Helsinki, February 24, 1970.
- Sallinen, Aulis: Concerto for Chamber Orchestra Op. 3, 1959–1960. 1(1)121/1000/00, strings. Duration: 22'. — Publisher: Novello. First Performance: Finnish RSO, cond. Paavo Berglund, Helsinki, November 15, 1960.
- Salmenhaara, Erkki: Suomi – Finland, 1966. 2222/4330/11, harp, strings. Duration: 18'. — Commissioned by the Finnish Broadcasting Company. Distributor: Fimic. First Performance: Finnish RSO, cond. Paavo Berglund, Helsinki, October 31, 1967.

Preceded by Nils-Eric Fougstedt	Principal Conductor, Finnish Radio Symphony Orchestra; 1962–1971	Succeeded by Okko Kamu
Preceded by Constantin Silvestri	Principal Conductor, Bournemouth Symphony Orchestra; 1972–1979	Succeeded by Uri Segal
Preceded by Jorma Panula	Music Director, Helsinki Philharmonic Orchestra; 1975–1979	Succeeded by Ulf Söderblom
Preceded by Yuri Ahronovich	Principal Conductor, Royal Stockholm Philharmonic Orchestra; 1987–1990	Succeeded by Gennadi Rozhdestvensky
Preceded by John Frandsen	Principal Conductor, Royal Danish Orchestra; 1993–1998	Succeeded by Michael Schønwandt
Preceded by unknown	Principal Guest Conductor, Scottish National Orchestra; 1981–1985	Succeeded by unknown
