= Ritva Auvinen =

Finnish opera singer (1932–2026)

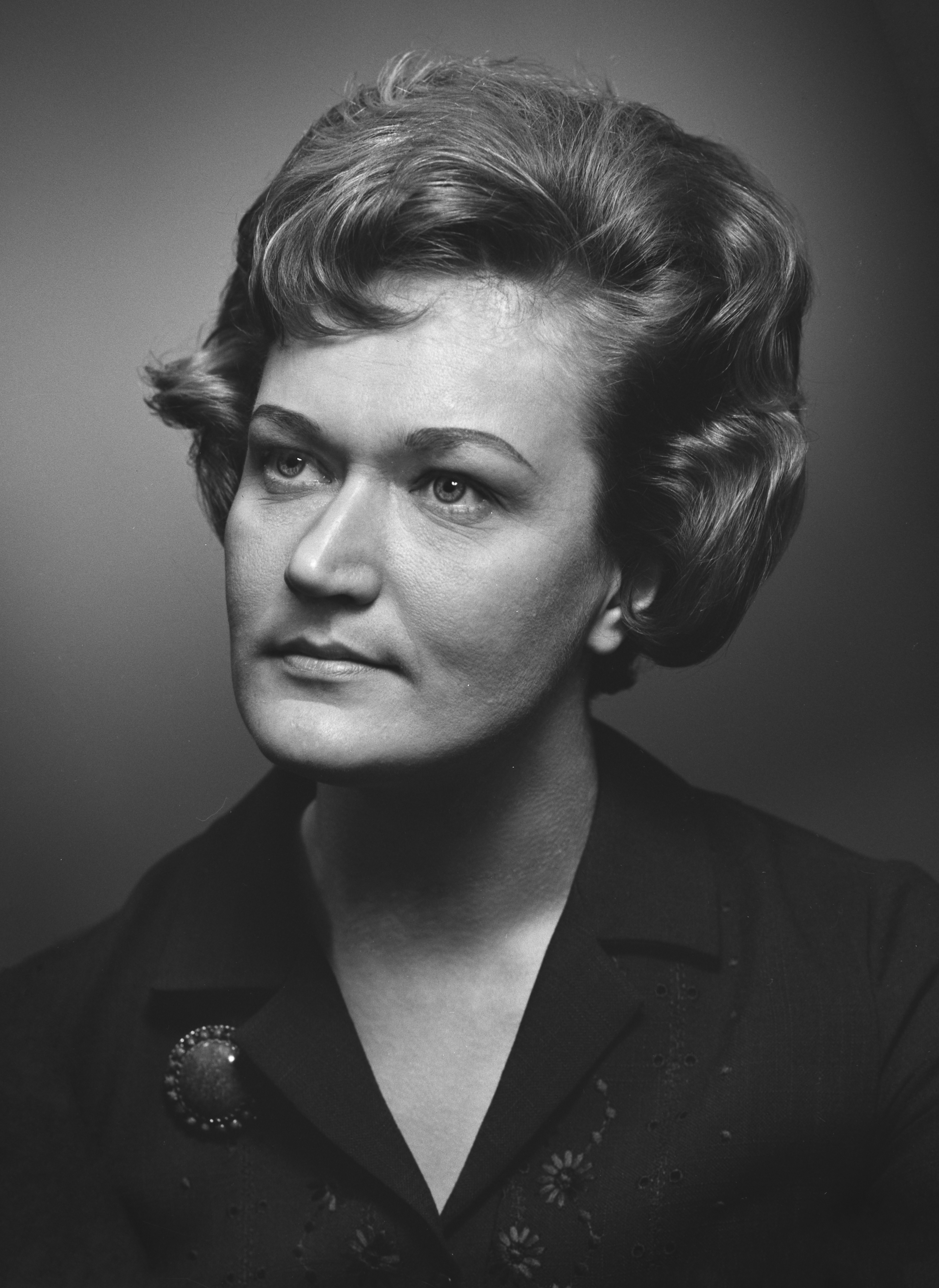
- Auvinen in 1965
- Born: 18 October 1932; Sortavala, Finland
- Died: 2 January 2026 (aged 93); Helsinki, Finland
- Education: Sibelius Academy
- Occupations: Operatic soprano; Academic teacher
- Spouse: Pentti Kolehmainen
- Awards: Pro Finlandia medal

Ritva Alina Auvinen-Kolehmainen (18 October 1932 – 2 January 2026) was a Finnish operatic soprano and academic voice teacher. She appeared in more than 70 opera roles in a long career, working freelance for the Finnish National Opera, and was recognised internationally for leading roles that she performed in world premieres of Finnish operas such as Kokkonen's The Last Temptations and Sallinen's The Red Line.

== Life and career ==
Auvinen was born in the village Kuokkaniemi near Sortavala on 18 October 1932. Growing up in the country with eight elder siblings, she liked Italian and German pop songs and schlager of the 1950s, singing them at home and playing the piano in a "homemade style". She studied at the Helsinki University to become a gymnastics teacher. Her elder brother, Raimo, introduced her to opera. She studied voice at the Sibelius Academy in Helsinki with Mirjam Helin from 1962 to 1967. She made her concert debut in Helsinki in 1965. Auvinen studied further in Italy with Gina Cigna and Luigi Ricci, and in Vienna with Peter Klein. She performed in operas in Lahti, at the Tampere Opera and in Jyväskylä. She also worked as a teacher for gymnastics and swimming.

From 1975 Auvinen was a regular guest at the Finnish National Opera where she appeared in 70 roles, mostly in Finnish repertoire, without ever becoming a member of the ensemble. She appeared in several new Finnish operas in the 1970s that garnered international recognition and became known as "fur hat operas", including Kokkonen's The Last Temptations, premiered in 1975, and Sallinen's The Red Line (1978). She appeared as Riitta in The Last Temptations, portraying the wife of revivalist preacher Paavo Ruotsalainen alongside Martti Talvela at the 1987 Savonlinna Opera Festival. The production toured internationally to seven cities, and Auvinen said that a performance at the Metropolitan Opera in New York City in 1983 marked "the pinnacle of her career". She performed on tour also in Stockholm, Oslo, Zürich, Wiesbaden and Leningrad, and performed the role also for a complete recording for Deutsche Grammophon. She often appeared as Riikka in The Red Line, the mother of a poor family. She appeared in Helsinki also as Renata in Prokofiev's The Fiery Angel, in the title role of Ariadne auf Naxos by R. Strauss in 1986, and as Emilia Marty in Janácek's The Makropoulos Affair in 1988. She portrayed Lady Macbeth in Verdi's Macbeth (opera) at the 1993 Savonlinna Festival, and performed at the Ilmajoki Music Festival. She took part in the world premiere of Tapio Tuomela's Mothers and Daughters in a concert version on 6 November 1999 at the Almi Hall of the National Opera in Helsinki.

Auvinen also performed concerts abroad, giving recitals in Philadelphia, Washington, D.C., London, the Brahms hall of the Vienna Musikverein (in 1985), in Salzburg, Bukarest, Hamburg and Lübeck. In addition, she worked as a voice teacher at the Sibelius Academy for 15 years and at other Helsinki conservatories.

She received the Pro Finlandia medal in 1979 and the award of the Savonlinna Opera Festival in 2012. She appeared, together with her brother Raimo Auvinen, in a concert on the occasion of her 80th birthday at the Helsinki Music Centre.

Auvinen died in Helsinki on 2 January 2026, at the age of 93.
