= Taru Valjakka =

Finnish opera singer

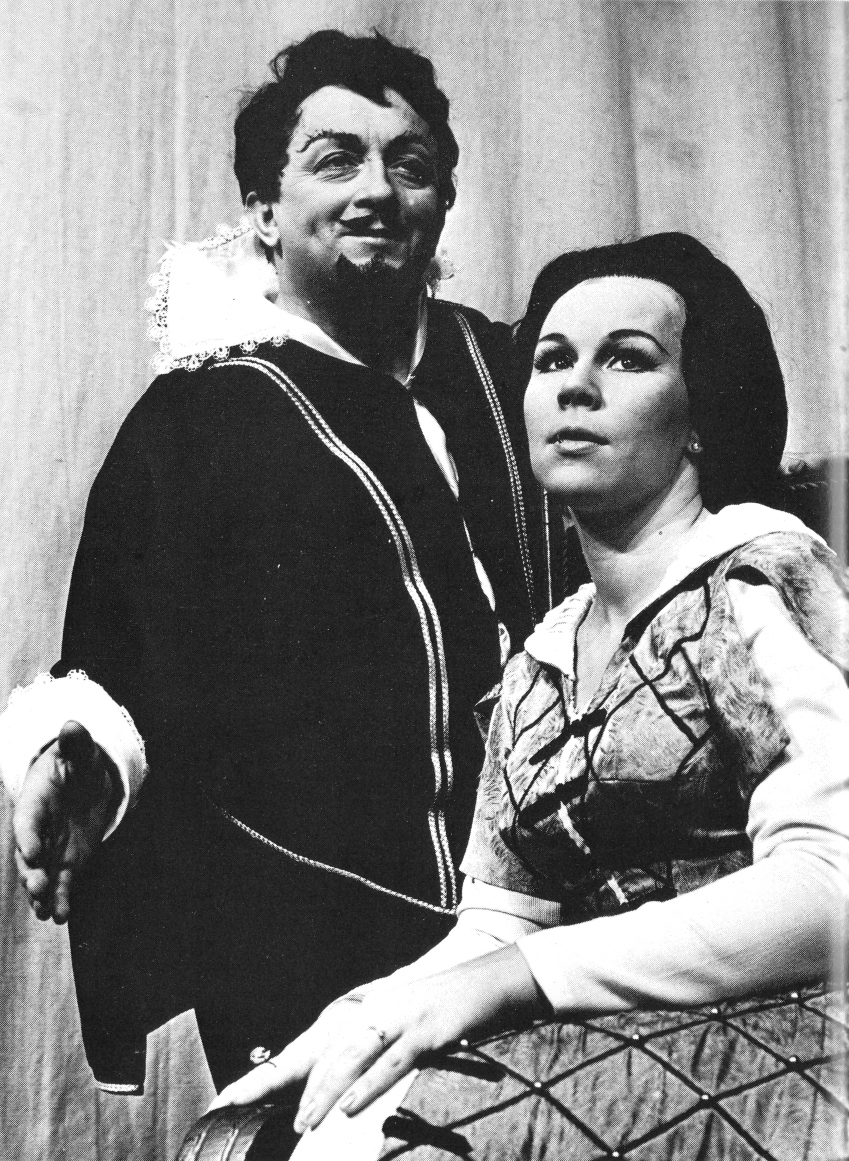
Veikko Tyrväinen (Ottavio) and Taru Valjakka (Donna Anna) performing Don Giovanni year 1964.

Taru Aura Helena Valjakka (née Kumpunen; 16 September 1938, Helsinki, Finland) is a Finnish soprano opera singer.

Before her opera career she worked as music teacher and a choir director in Helsinki. She made her opera debut in 1964 as Donna Anna in Mozart's Don Giovanni.

She had a central role in rise of the new Finnish opera in 1970s, singing lead roles in world premieres of The Horseman and The Red Line by Aulis Sallinen, The Last Temptations by Joonas Kokkonen and Silkkirumpu by Paavo Heininen.

Valjakka is also noted for lied recitals and her interpretations of songs by Jean Sibelius.
