= Martti Wallén =

Finnish operatic bass singer (1948–2024)

- Martti Wallén, in the 1990s
- Born: 20 November 1948; Helsinki, Finland
- Died: 29 June 2024 (aged 75); Sineu, Spain
- Education: Sibelius Academy
- Occupation: Operatic bass
- Organizations: Finnish National Opera; Royal Swedish Opera

Martti Wallén (20 November 1948 – 29 June 2024) was a Finnish operatic bass singer. Born in Helsinki, he performed both internationally and in his native country where he was a visiting soloist at the Finnish National Opera for many years. He created the role of the Judge in the world premiere of Aulis Sallinen's The Horseman at the Savonlinna Opera Festival in 1975. He was a member of the Royal Swedish Opera from 1975 to 2000.

== Life and career ==
Wallén was born in Helsinki on 28 November 1948. He initially studied in an Orthodox theological seminary. After completing his studies as a cantor in 1968, he studied voice with Pekka Salomaa at the Sibelius Academy in Helsinki from 1970 to 1975, with Torsten Föllinger in Stockholm and Luigi Ricci and Achille Braschi in Rome. He served as the cantor for the Helsinki Orthodox congregation from 1968 to 1972.

Wallèn made his operatic debut as Colline in La bohème in 1973 as a soloist of the Finnish National Opera. He was also a soloist at the Savonlinna Opera Festival, where he performed the role of the Judge in the world premiere of Aulis Sallinen's The Horseman in 1975. The performance, with Matti Salminen in the title role, was recorded.

In 1975 Wallén joined the Royal Swedish Opera in Stockholm, first appearing as Sparafucile in Verdi's Rigoletto. From 1980 to 1982 he was also a soloist at the Musiktheater im Revier in Gelsenkirchen. When the new opera house in Helsinki was opened in 1992, he appeared as the Father in Sallinen's Kullervo, which was premiered in Los Angeles. He remained a member of the Royal Swedish Opera until 2000 and then worked freelance until 2004, when he performed last with the Royal Opera, at the Drottningholm Palace Theatre.

Wallén appeared as a soloist internationally, including at the Bolshoi Theatre in Moscow, in Antwerp, Brussels, Bruges, at the Estonia Theatre in Tallinn, in Wiesbaden, Zürich, Manchester and Leeds. He had also performed at the Helsinki Festival, the Naantali Festival, and several other festivals and recitals in the Nordic countries.

=== Personal life ===
Wallén had two children, Herman Wallén (tenor), and Ida Wallén (mezzo-soprano), who both work as professional singers in Germany. From 2004, he lived with his wife Lola in Sineu in the interior of the island of Mallorca. He said in an interview that he liked walking his dog, reading history books, listening to music and surfing the internet. He said he was up to date with Spanish music because his wife was "very good with the guitar and sevillanas".

Wallèn died in Sineu on 29 June 2024, at the age of 75.

== Repertoire ==
Among Wallén's most important roles were:

- Beethoven: Rocco, Pizarro, Fernando (Fidelio)
- Janácek: Dikoj (Káťa Kabanová)
- Maxwell Davies: Arthur (The Lighthouse)
- Mozart: Bartolo (Le nozze di Figaro), Don Alfonso (Così fan tutte), Leporello, Commendatore, title role (Don Giovanni), Sarastro (The Magic Flute)
- Musorgsky: Pimen (Boris Godunov), Gypsy (The Fair at Sorochyntsi)
- Rossini: Basilio (Il barbiere di Siviglia)
- Strauss: Ochs (Der Rosenkavalier), Geisterbote (Die Frau ohne Schatten)
- Tchaikovsky: Gremin (Eugene Onegin), Archbishop (The Maid of Orleans)
- Verdi: Walter (Luisa Miller), Banquo (Macbeth), Sparafucile, Monterone (Rigoletto), Ferrando (Il trovatore), Pater Guardian (La forza del destino), Philip II (Don Carlos), Falstaff
- Wagner: Daland (Der fliegende Holländer), Landgraf (Tannhäuser), Pogner (Die Meistersinger von Nürnberg), King Marke (Tristan und Isolde, Fasolt (Das Rheingold), Hunding (Die Walküre)

Wallén performed several other roles in Finnish contemporary operas:

- Bergman: Peddler (Det sjungande trädet)
- Kokkonen: Paavo Ruotsalainen (The Last Temptations)
- Ilkka Kuusisto: Muminpappan (Muminopera)
- Leevi Madetoja: Länsman ((Österbottningarna)
- Pehr Henrik Nordgren: Munken (Den svarta Munken)
- Rautavaara: Salomon (Tietäjien lahja)
- Sallinen: Judge (The Horseman), Kalervo (Kullervo)

== Recordings ==
In addition to several recordings of Finnish Christmas songs and Orthodox church music, Wallén recorded:

- Sallinen: The Horseman (as the Judge) – Savonlinna Opera Festival Chorus and Orchestra conducted by Ulf Söderblom. Label: Finlandia
- Bergman: Det sjungande trädet (as the Peddler) – Tapiola Chamber Choir, Dominante Choir, Finnish National Opera Orchestra conducted by Ulf Söderblom. Label: Ondine
- Verdi: Don Carlos (as the Old Monk) – Royal Stockholm Opera Orchestra and Chorus conducted by Alberto Hold-Garrido. Label: Naxos.
