= Finnish opera =

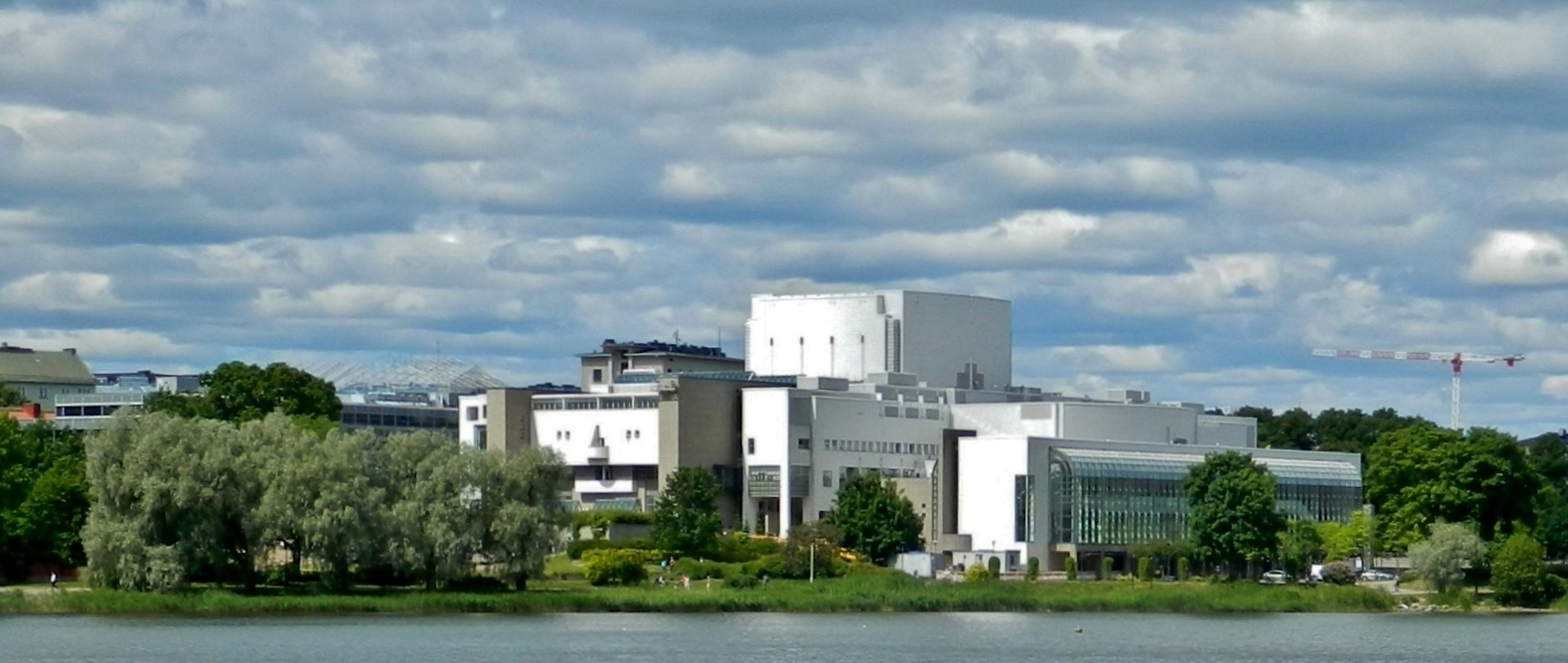
Opera house in Helsinki.

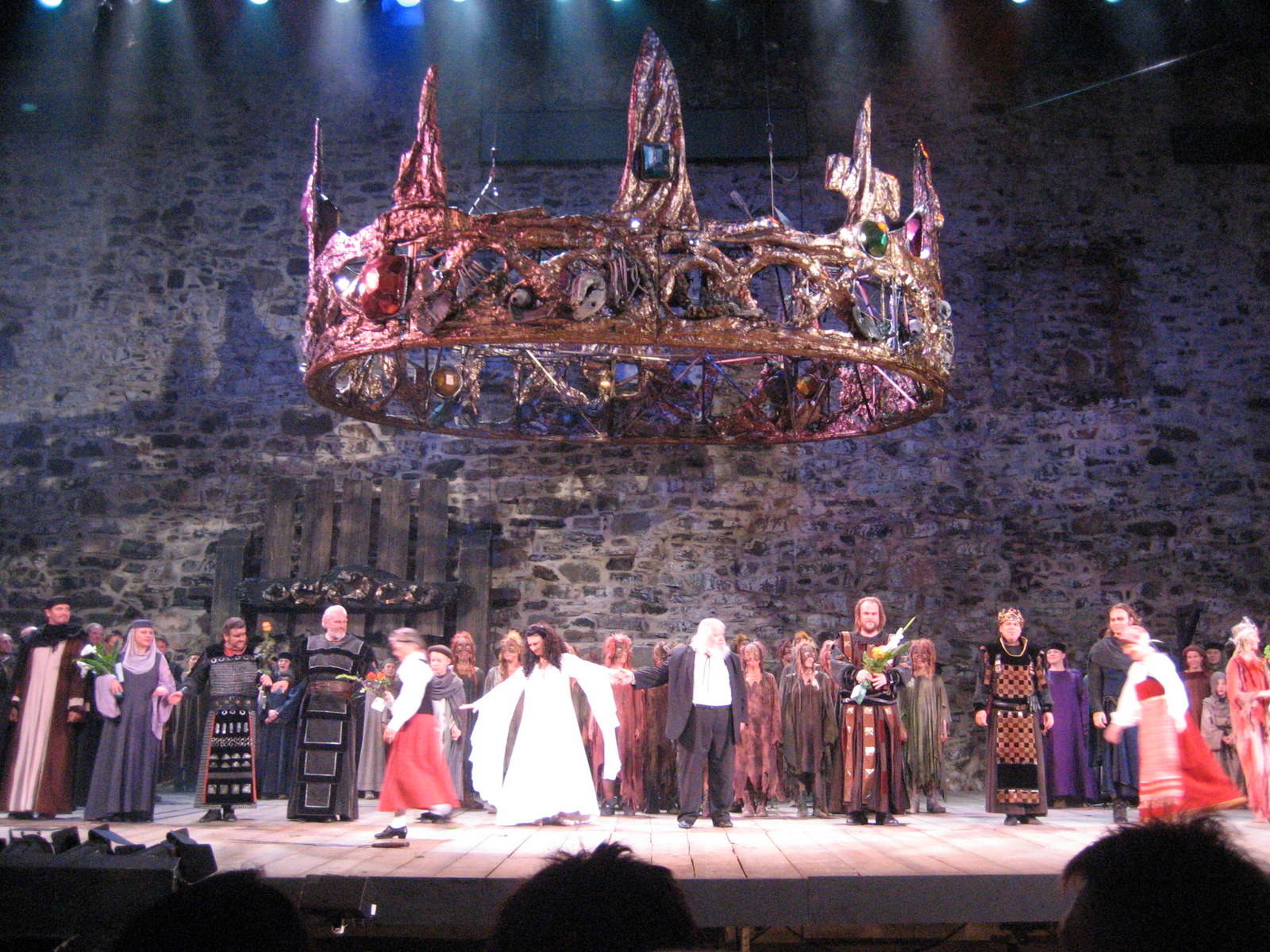
Macbeth applause at Savonlinna Opera festival in 2007.

The origins of Finnish opera can be traced to the late 18th or 19th century, when the first opera performances were staged in Finland. It is generally assumed that the first opera performance in Finland took place in 1768 in Turku, when the troupe of Carl Gottlieb Seuerling presented the opera Adam und Eva by Johann Theile. However, other sources state that there was no orchestra at this performance.

The first opera to be composed in Finland was Kung Karls jakt with music by Fredrik Pacius and a libretto by Zacharias Topelius. It was first performed in Helsinki on 24 March 1852.

The first opera performance in the Finnish language is supposed to be Lucia di Lammermoor presented by the Finnish National Theatre in 1873. There were 25-30 operas in the repertoire of the company.

The Domestic Opera established by Aino Ackté and Edvard Fazer gave its first performance 2 October 1911. It later became the Finnish National Opera.

Savonlinna Opera Festival takes place annually at the medieval Olavinlinna in the city of Savonlinna. Aino Ackté organised the first festival in Savonlinna summer 1912.

After Finland gained independence in 1917, Russian-owned Alexander Theatre become property of Finland. It was given "temporarily" for the Finnish Opera, which used it for 70 years while waiting for the purpose-built opera house to be constructed.

Finnish opera got international reputation in the 1970s with works by Joonas Kokkonen and Aulis Sallinen. Kokkonen's opera The Last Temptations (1975) was staged in Metropolitan in New York in 1983 and received over 500 performances worldwide.

Famous singers include Matti Salminen, Martti Talvela, Karita Mattila and Soile Isokoski. BBC Music Magazine named Mattila as one of the top 20 sopranos of the recorded era in 2007.

In the 21st century, Kaija Saariaho's works have become the most performed operas.
