= The Horseman (opera) =

Opera in three acts by Aulis Sallinen

The Horseman Ratsumies
- Opera by Aulis Sallinen
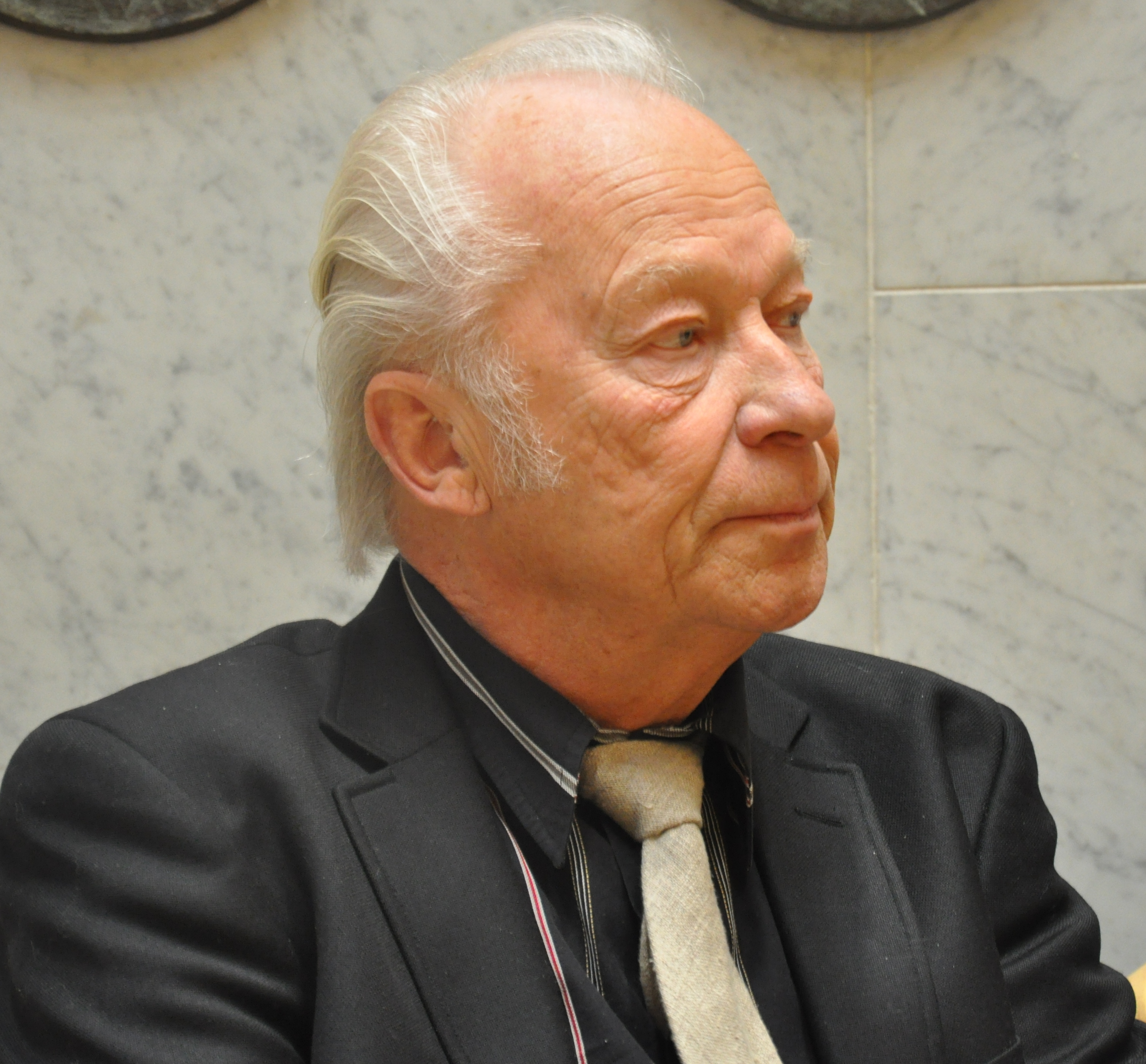
- Aulis Sallinen in 2009
- Librettist: Paavo Haavikko
- Language: Finnish
- Premiere: 17 June 1975; Savonlinna Opera Festival

The Horseman (Finnish: Ratsumies, Swedish: Ryttaren) is an opera in three acts by Aulis Sallinen, based on a libretto by Paavo Haavikko. It was premiered at the Savonlinna Opera Festival on 17 June 1975 to celebrate the 500th anniversary of the Olavinlinna Castle, and is the first of Sallinen's operas, and is replete with heavy symbolism and historical allegories. According to George Loomis, writing in The New York Times, the work "is widely credited for helping to precipitate a wave of Finnish operas".

A critic at the premiere described the work as a "timeless parable of a country and nation ground between, and harried by two mighty neighbours" (Sweden and Russia), depicting "the sufferings of individuals speak for the sufferings of a long downtrodden nation". Its libretto "filled with paradoxes and ambiguities, is like a crossword puzzle with several correct solutions".

Sallinen's music is described as "immediately and excitingly accessible... with powerful dramatic feeling." The work can be seen as "three symphonic sequences that share thematic material but are different in character" where the orchestral forces have a pre-eminent role.

The work won the composer's prize of the Nordic Council (Nordic Council Music Prize) in 1978.

== Roles ==
Roles, voice types, premiere cast
Role	Voice type	Premiere cast, 17 June 1975 (Conductor: Ulf Söderblom)
Antti (The Horseman)	bass	Matti Salminen
Anna, his wife	soprano	Taru Valjakka
Merchant	tenor	Eero Erkkilä
Merchant's wife	soprano	Anita Välkki
Yeoman	baritone	Usko Viitanen
Matti Puykkanen	bass	Heikki Toivanen
Woman	soprano	Tuula Nieminen
Judge	bass	Martti Wallén
Chorus

== Performance history ==
The opera premiered at the 1975 Savonlinna opera festival. It was also performed in place of the first night of Boris Godunov on July 24 that season due to a badly inflamed foot injury to Martti Talvela (who was to play Boris); cast and technicians, uncontactable by phone, were gathered from day trips in the local countryside, and the conductor was flown by seaplane from the Helsinki archipelago for a last-minute replacement evening.

The opera was revived at the 2005 Savonlinna Opera Festival with Juha Uusitalo as Antti and Johanna Rusanen as Anna, conducted by Ari Rasilainen in a new production directed by Vilppu Kiljunen. The opera was performed by the Savonlinna Festival forces at the Bolshoi Theatre in Moscow in 2006.

In May 2005 the 50th anniversary of the premiere (and in the 90th year of the composer) a new production was mounted at the Finnish National Opera, conducted by Hannu Lintu.

A live recording of the premiere performance was released on LP by Finlandia Records in 1979, and later re-issued on CD by the same label.

== Synopsis ==
=== Act 1 ===
The story begins at Eastertide in 16th century Russia where Anna and her husband are kept as serfs in a merchant's household in Novgorod. Anna seduces the merchant but the wife of the merchant finds this out and humiliates Antti; she then insists that her husband kill Antti and Anna. Antti binds the merchant and his wife and sets fire to their house. As he dies the merchant predicts Antti his death.

=== Act 2 ===
They escape to Finland, where, in the second act a series of cases are heard in a courtroom at Olavinlinna castle. The first defendant turns out to be Anna who is accused of burying her baby by an unknown man in the forest. Anna declares herself a widow whose husband appears to her in a dream. Antti appears disguised as an old man, to give evidence of Anna's husband's death. The horseman reports on the night in Novgorod, when the house of the merchant burned and they all perished. By the end of the act all the prisoners escape.

=== Act 3 ===
The last act is set in a forest place near the hovel of a poacher, Matti Puikkanen where are living Antti, Anna, a woman, and a groom. People come with plans to attack the royal castle. The people ask Antti to lead their army, as he has experience of war, and he agrees. Women try to persuade guards to open the castle gates but the army has secretly followed the plans and starts shooting the rebels. Antti and his group are killed; Anna sings a lament for her slain husband.
