= Villa Kokkonen =

Residential building in Finland

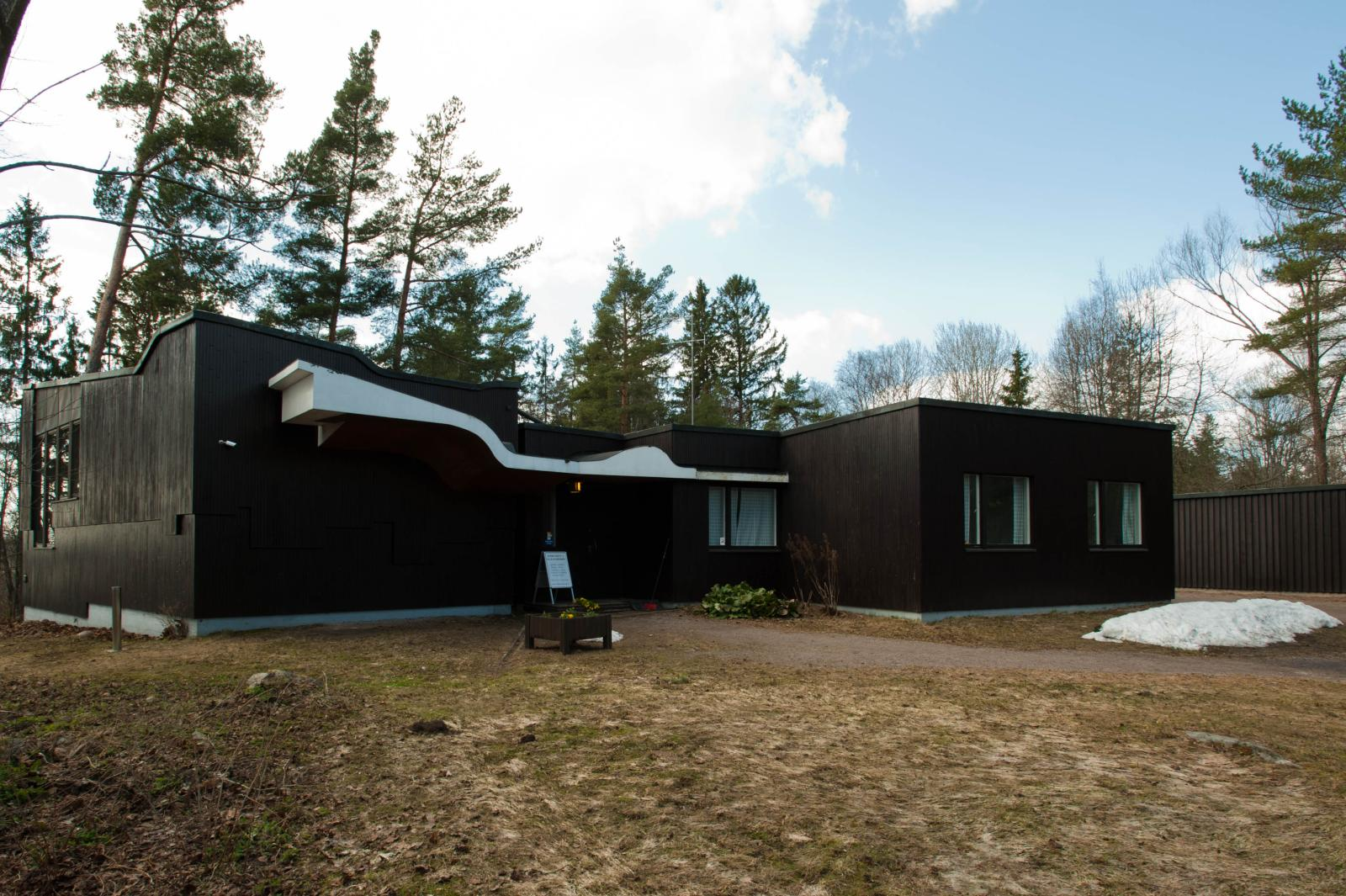
- Interactive map of the Villa Kokkonen area

General information
- Type: Residential
- Architectural style: Modern architecture
- Location: Tuulimyllyntie 5; 04400 Järvenpää, Järvenpää, Finland
- Coordinates: 60.4574517°N 25.0570445°E
- Current tenants: Artist Home Villa Kokkonen
- Named for: Joonas Kokkonen
- Completed: 1969

Design and construction
- Architect: Alvar Aalto

Website
- www.villakokkonen.fi/en

Villa Kokkonen is a residential building located in Järvenpää, Finland, notable for having been designed by the Finnish architect Alvar Aalto for the composer Joonas Kokkonen.

== Background ==
Villa Kokkonen is one of only a few private residential buildings, and the only artist's home, designed by Aalto.

Despite being at the height of his professional reputation in the late 1960s, Aalto did not charge anything for his design. Kokkonen, in turn, dedicated his cello concerto, which he had composed in his newly-completed house, to Aalto, as a token of his gratitude. As a result of the project, and their contemporary memberships of the Academy of Finland, the two became firm friends.

Villa Kokkonen forms part of the wider artist community on the shores of Lake Tuusulanjärvi.

Kokkonen moved into the house in 1969, together with his second wife Else-Maj ("Maija") and their two daughters (then aged 11 and 14 respectively). Maija died in 1979, and the following year Kokkonen married Anita Pakomaa, who moved into the house. Kokkonen lived in the house until his death in 1996, Anita Pakomaa moved out, and the City of Järvenpää purchased it from his estate. It is now open to the public as a museum, for guided tours and as a concert and event venue.

== Design ==
The initial design was sketched on a white tablecloth of the restaurant where Aalto and Kokkonen were dining after visiting the site. The main design work was carried out in 1967-69.

The building is broadly fan-like in shape, and comprises three main sections: living and dining areas; study, centred around a grand piano; and private quarters including kitchen and bedrooms. There is also a small attached apartment for staff.

Separate buildings on the plot include a garage, sauna with adjacent guest accommodation, as well as a swimming pool.

The main building and sauna are constructed of logs, with exterior cladding of dark-stained wood boards.

== External sites ==
- Official website
- Villa Kokkonen on Alvar Aalto Foundation
