= Jaakko Ryhänen =

Finnish singer

- Born: 2 December 1946 (age 79); Tampere, Finland
- Education: Sibelius Academy

Jaakko Ryhänen (born 2 December 1946) is a Finnish opera singer (bass) and voice pedagog.

Ryhänen initially trained as a primary school teacher. He later studied singing at the Sibelius Academy under Matti Lehtinen and Jolanda di Maria Petris.

His professional debut came at the Finnish National Opera in January 1973, as Fafner in Das Rheingold. In total, Ryhänen performed nearly 600 times at the National Opera in a career lasting almost four decades, from 1973 to 2011.

Ryhänen toured extensively as a soloist, and made guest appearances at numerous international opera houses, including Vienna, Berlin, London, Paris, Milan, Moscow and New York. In 2003, he signed a five-year-contract with the Bayreuth Festival.

His key roles have included Paavo Ruotsalainen in The Last Temptations, Sarastro in The Magic Flute, and Hunding in Die Walküre.

Ryhänen has defined his own voice as basso cantante, or lyric high-bass.

From 1994 to 1996, he held the professorship of voice at the Sibelius Academy, and in 2003 at the Estonian Academy of Music.

Ryhänen officially retired at the conclusion of the 2012 Savonlinna Opera Festival, although he has continued performing occasionally since. His biography Minun matkani (lit. 'My journey') was published in March 2022.
