= Jolanda di Maria Petris =

Italian-Finnish singer

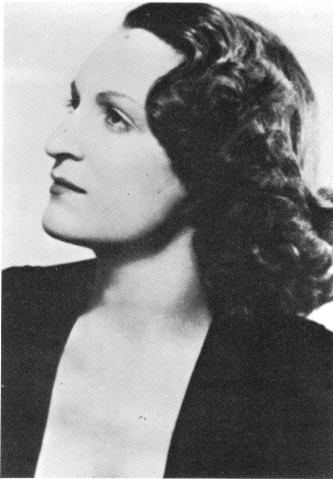
- Born: Jolanda Antonia Lucia Petris; 5 September 1916; Pola, Austria-Hungary
- Died: 7 February 1987 (aged 70); Helsinki, Finland
- Education: Liceo Musicale di Bologna; Conservatorio Arrigo Boito
- Spouse: Dr Angelo di Maria (m. 1935; div. 1946)

Jolanda di Maria Petris (1916–1987) was an Italian-Finnish operatic soprano and voice pedagog.

Following studies at the Liceo Musicale (now Conservatorio Giovanni Battista Martini) in Bologna and the Parma Conservatory in the early 1930s, she was attached to the Rome Opera House from 1935 until 1937. She won several singing competitions, and toured extensively in Europe and the Americas, including with many notable singers such as Beniamino Gigli, Jussi Björling and Giuseppe De Luca.

After World War II, di Maria Petris got divorced and moved to Finland, where she made a career as a voice teacher; among her many students is Jaakko Ryhänen, who credits her as his most influential tutor. She was appointed as a singing instructor at the Sibelius Academy in 1960. She also judged several international singing competitions from the late 1950s until the mid-1970s.
