= Lauri Kokkonen =

Finnish author and playwright

- Born: Lauri Hermanni Kokkonen; 9 August 1918; Pielavesi, Finland
- Died: 6 October 1985 (aged 67); Oulu, Finland
- Occupation: Author, playwright

Lauri Hermanni Kokkonen (August 9, 1918 in Pielavesi – October 6, 1985 in Oulu) was a Finnish author and playwright. He is famous as the writer of the plays Viimeiset kiusaukset (The Last Temptations, 1960) and Ruskie neitsyt (The Red Maiden, 1969). He later wrote the libretto, based on his own play, to the opera version of The Last Temptations by Joonas Kokkonen.

== Works ==
- Hopeinen kynttilänjalka 5-act play. Jyväskylä 1960. Gummerus 124 pages, illustrated.
- Laahus. Komediaa tiistaina, keskiviikkona ja perjantaina Jyväskylä 1958. Gummerus. 137 pages, illustrated. Translated into Swedish (Släpet).
- Viimeiset kiusaukset Play. 14 acts. Jyväskylä 1960. Gummerus. 102 pages. (Libretto to an opera by Joonas Kokkonen, The Last Temptations. Translated into English, Swedish and German.)
- Häähuone 3-act comedy. Jyväskylä 1961. Gummerus. 146 pages, illustrated.
- Kultakivet 1961. Radio drama.
- Myrskylintu 1962. Play.
- Päivän nimi 1963. Play.
- Herodekset ratsailla 1965. Play.
- Kenttäpostia Novel. Helsinki 1966. Weilin&Göös.211 pages.
- Ruskie neitsyt Play 1969. Printed in Porvoo 1973. WSOY.
- Muuttolinnut 3-act comedy. Helsinki 1977. Finnish Playwrights and Screenwriters Guild .
- Hildan koulu 1980. Play.
- Vaeltajat Play. Printed in Porvoo 1984. WSOY. 84 pages.

== Honours and awards ==
- Finnish National Prize for Literature 1961
- Knight, First Class, of the Order of the Lion of Finland
- Professor (title and style granted by The President of The Republic of Finland) 1978
