= Anita Välkki =

Finnish opera singer

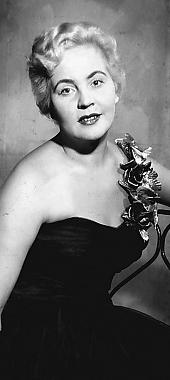
Anita Välkki in 1955

Anita Välkki (25 October 1926 – 27 April 2011) was a Finnish dramatic soprano who had an international career in major roles at leading opera houses.

== Training and career ==
Välkki was born in Sääksmäki. She trained in Helsinki and began her career as an actress and a singer in operettas in 1952. In 1954 she gave a concert in Helsinki which led to her being invited to join the Finnish National Opera. In 1960 her international career began when she appeared as Brünnhilde in Wagner's Die Walküre at the Royal Swedish Opera. She made her debut at the Royal Opera House London in the same role in 1961 and at the Metropolitan Opera New York in 1962, where she was praised as "completely in her element". She also appeared at the Met as Puccini's Turandot, her most performed opera role on the stage, and in leading roles in Wagner's operas Der fliegende Holländer, Tannhäuser and Parsifal. Välkki appeared at the Bayreuth Festival as Brünnhilde in 1963/64, and her career also took her to Mexico City, Vienna and Philadelphia in roles that included Verdi's Aida and Santuzza in Mascagni's Cavalleria rusticana. Praised for her strong and clear voice and dramatic ability, Välkki also appeared in Finnish operas, creating the role of the Merchant's Wife in The Horseman by Aulis Sallinen at the Savonlinna Opera Festival in 1975, and singing in Aarre Merikanto's Juha in Helsinki in 1986.

Anita Välkki decided to stay and continue her singing career in her native Finland from the early 1970s on despite being in demand abroad. After finishing her own singing career in the early 1980s, Anita Välkki was invited to teach singing at Sibelius Academy in Helsinki 1982 and she made a very significant career as a singing pedagog there for decades. She died in Helsinki, aged 84.
