= Ulf Söderblom =

Finnish conductor and music professor

Ulf Arne Söderblom (5 February 1930 – 4 February 2016) was a Finnish conductor and music professor. He was the principal conductor of the Finnish National Opera from 1973 to 1993 and was a key figure in the revival of the Savonlinna Opera Festival. A champion of Finnish music, he has conducted the world premieres of several works by Finnish composers including Kokkonen's The Last Temptations and Sallinen's Kullervo and The Horseman.

== Life and career ==
Söderblom was born in Turku, the son of Arne Paulinus Soderblom and Gerda Mathilda Rajalin. He studied at the Åbo Akademi University in Turku with Otto Andersson from 1950 to 1952 and at the Vienna Music Academy with Hans Swarowsky from 1954 to 1957. He made his conducting debut in 1957 conducting a production of The Magic Flute in Turku. That same year he married physiotherapist Karin Helena Ehrnrooth.

He began conducting for the Finnish National Opera in 1957, initially as a choral conductor, and in 1973 became its Chief Conductor and Music Director, a position he would hold for the next 20 years. He was also instrumental in the revival of the Savonlinna Opera Festival in 1967 after 50 years of dormancy. The re-opening was celebrated with Söderblom conducting Beethoven's Fidelio in the Olavinlinna castle.

As a music professor, Söderblom taught conducting at the Sibelius Academy and conducted its orchestras from 1965 to 1968 and at the Åbo Akademi University from 1991. Åbo Akademi University awarded him an honorary doctorate in 1998.

He died the day before his 86th birthday.

== World premieres conducted ==
- The Horseman by Aulis Sallinen, Savonlinna, 17 July 1975
- The Last Temptations by Joonas Kokkonen, Helsinki, 2 September 1975
- Silkkirumpu (The Damask Drum) by Paavo Heininen, Helsinki, 5 April 1984
- Veitsi (The Knife) by Paavo Heininen, Savonlinna, 3 July 1989
- Det sjungande trädet (The Singing Tree) by Erik Bergman, Helsinki, 3 September 1995
- Kullervo by Aulis Sallinen, Los Angeles, 25 February 1992

In addition to the above staged performances, Söderblom also conducted the world premiere recording of Aarre Merikanto's Juha in 1972.
