= Paavo Ruotsalainen =

Finnish lay preacher

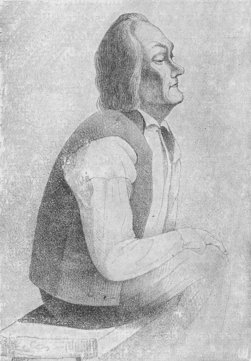
- Paavo Ruotsalainen depicted in the book Suomen historia (3rd edition, 1926)
- Born: Påhl Henrik Ruotsalainen; 9 July 1777; Tölvänniemi, Lapinlahti, Finland
- Died: 27 January 1852 (aged 74); Nilsiä (now part of Kuopio), Finland
- Occupations: Farmer, lay preacher, leader of revivalist Awakening religious movement

Paavo Heikki Ruotsalainen (Finnish pronunciation: [ˈpɑːʋo ˈhei̯kːi ˈruo̯tsɑlɑi̯nen]; born Påhl Henrik; 9 July 1777 – 27 January 1852) was a Finnish farmer and lay preacher who became the leader of the revivalist Awakening religious movement in Finland.

== Religious views ==
Born in Tölvänniemi (now a part of Lapinlahti) as the oldest son of plain farmers, he received his first Bible at age six. At the time of his confirmation he had already read it three times. His preoccupation with the words of the Bible gained him the nickname foolish Paavo. When he heard about the lay pastor Jakob Högman in Jyväskylä, he immediately walked the 200 km to Jyväskylä in the winter of 1799. This visit laid the foundation of his religious life.

Jakob Högman was known as an avid reader of a revivalist devotional booklet "Kallis Hunajan Pisara" ("The Choice Drop of Honey"). He gave Ruotsalainen a copy of the book which remained important to Paavo throughout his life. Högman illustrated to Paavo that there was one thing of utmost importance he was missing, so Högman said to Paavo:

"One thing you lack, though, and with it everything else: the inner feeling of Christ."

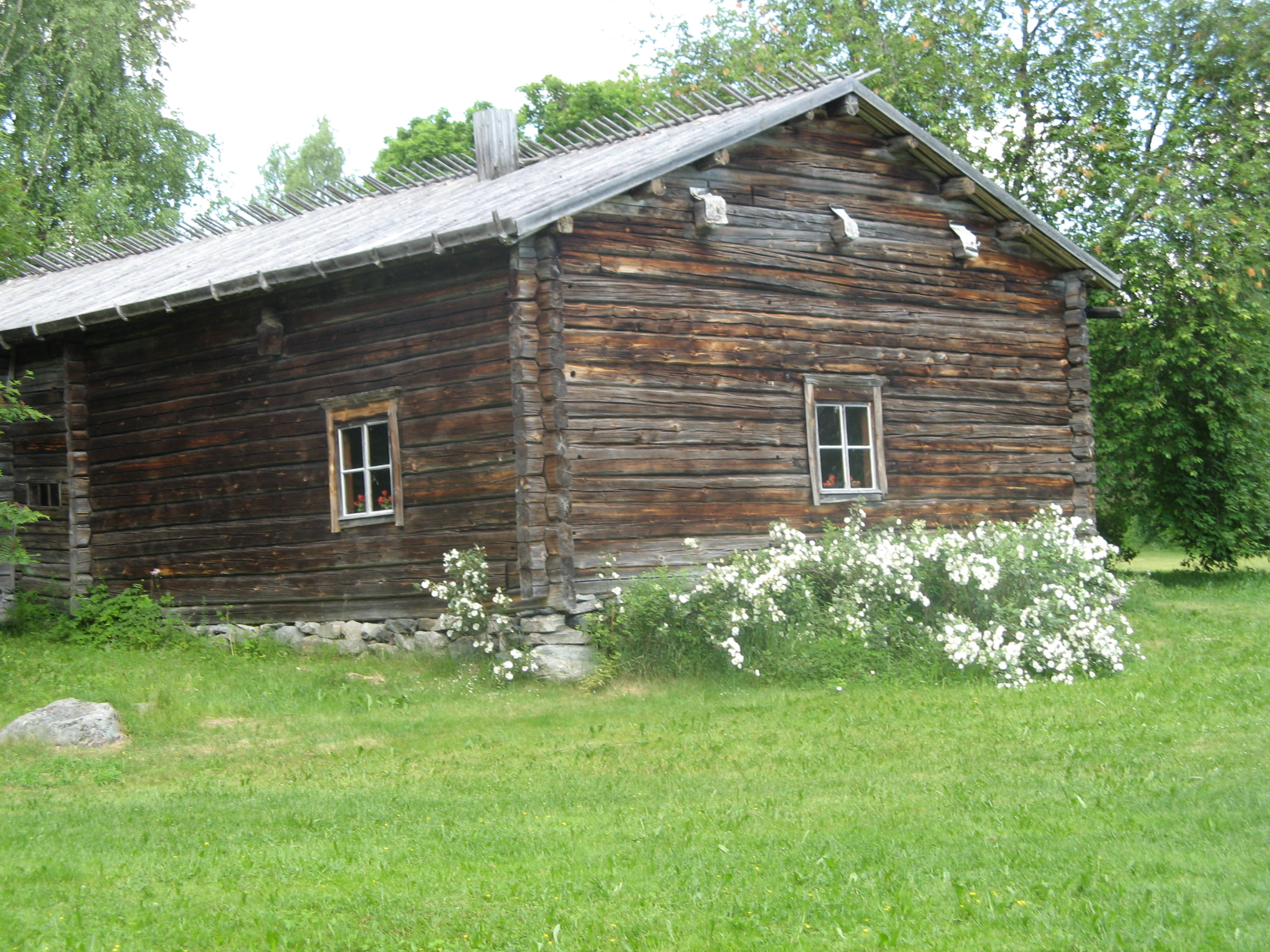
The original homestead of Paavo Ruotsalainen in Aholansaari, Nilsiä

== Revivalist movement ==
Ruotsalainen became the leader of the revivalist movement called herännäisyys (Awakening) in Finland. He traveled around Finland to meet with other members of the movement, most notably pastors Jonas Lagus and Nils Gustav Malmberg in Ostrobothnia.

It is estimated that he traveled 40,000 km altogether, most of it on foot. With the spreading of the movement, both church and state authorities became worried about it. In 1838-39 he was put on trial and fined, yet this could not stop the movement.

== Death ==
Ruotsalainen died on 27 January 1852 in Nilsiä, aged 74.

== In culture ==
In 1975, Ruotsalainen became the subject of The Last Temptations (Viimeiset kiusaukset in Finnish), an opera by Joonas Kokkonen, with a recording in the Deutsche Grammophon label. The libretto of the opera was written by Lauri Kokkonen who had earlier written a play with the same title.

== Works ==
- Ruotsalainen, Paavo (1977). The Inward Knowledge of Christ: The Letters and Other Writings. Luther-Agricola Society. ISBN 978-951-99142-0-6.
