= Matti Lehtinen =

Finnish operatic baritone (1922–2022)

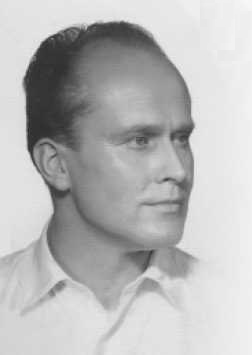
- Born: 24 April 1922; Lappeenranta, Finland
- Died: 16 August 2022 (aged 100); Helsinki, Finland
- Education: Sibelius Academy
- Occupations: Operatic baritone; Academic teacher
- Organizations: Finnish National Opera; Sibelius Academy
- Awards: Pro Finlandia

Matti Kalervo Lehtinen (24 April 1922 – 16 August 2022) was a Finnish operatic baritone, a long-term member of the Finnish National Opera, and professor of singing at the Sibelius Academy. He appeared at the Savonlinna Opera Festival and international opera houses, and as an oratorio and lieder singer.

== Early life and education ==
Lehtinen was born in Lappeenranta on 24 April 1922. Due to World War II, he could not continue with his studies and instead served in the military; he was wounded twice in combat during the Continuation War. He studied voice from 1945 to 1948 at the Sibelius Academy, and studied further in 1949 at the Royal Swedish Opera.

== Career ==
Lehtinen made his operatic debut in Helsinki in 1948 as Papageno in Mozart's Die Zauberflöte, leading to his engagement at the Finnish Opera.

In 1950, Lehtinen won the Geneva International Music Competition, which brought him international recognition. He belonged to the Cologne Opera from 1952 to 1955, which maintained a busy schedule each month. He then worked freelance in opera, oratorio and Lied until 1963. In 1958, he appeared in the title role in the world premiere of Casimir von Pászthory's Tilman Riemenschneider at Theater Basel, alongside Montserrat Caballé. On 12 June 1958, Kullervo by Jean Sibelius received its first complete performance of the twentieth century, having been resurrected by the composer's son-in-law, Jussi Jalas. Lehtinen sang the title role of Kullervo.

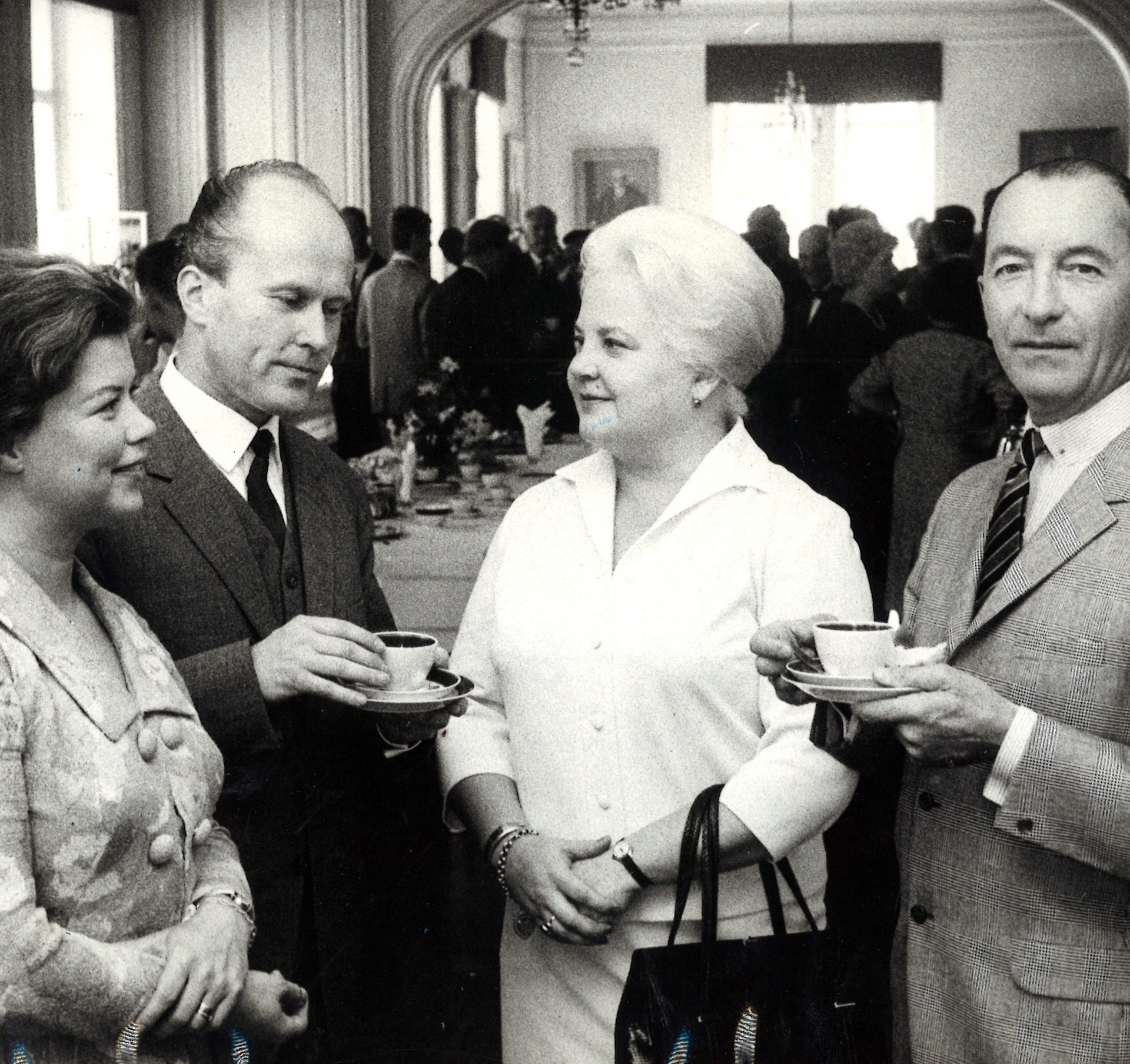
Lehtinen (second from left) at the 1965 season opening of the Finnish National Opera

In 1963, Lehtinen returned to the Finnish National Opera as an ensemble member. His roles there, and also at the Savonlinna Opera Festival, included Mozart's Leporello in Don Giovanni, Don Alfonso in Così fan tutte, Escamillo in Bizet's Carmen and Porgy in Gershwin's Porgy and Bess in 1964. He performed more than 60 operatic roles. Lehtinen also performed in operas by Finnish composers, and he was particularly remembered for performances at Savonlinna in the title role of Aarre Merikanto's Juha and in Kalevi Aho's monologue opera Avain. Further roles included Wolfram in Wagner's Tannhäuser, John Sorel in Menotti's The Consul, the Man in Schönberg's Die glückliche Hand and Valentin in Gounod's Faust.

He became professor of singing at the Sibelius Academy in 1963, remaining in the post until 1987. From 1963 to 1969, he served as director of the Academy's opera class. He influenced many students, including Jaakko Hietikon, Jaakko Kortekangas, Elja Puukko, Heikki Raivio, Esa Ruuttunen, and Matti Salminen.

== Later years and death ==
Lehtinen continued to appear as a singer until age 90, and he served as a narrator afterwards. For example, at age 93, he was the voice of God in Britten's Noye's Fludde. He died at age 100 in Helsinki on 16 August 2022 at a senior home, after a short illness.

== Awards ==
Lehtinen was awarded the Pro Finlandia medal in 1965.
