= Paavo Heininen =

Finnish composer and pianist (1938–2022)

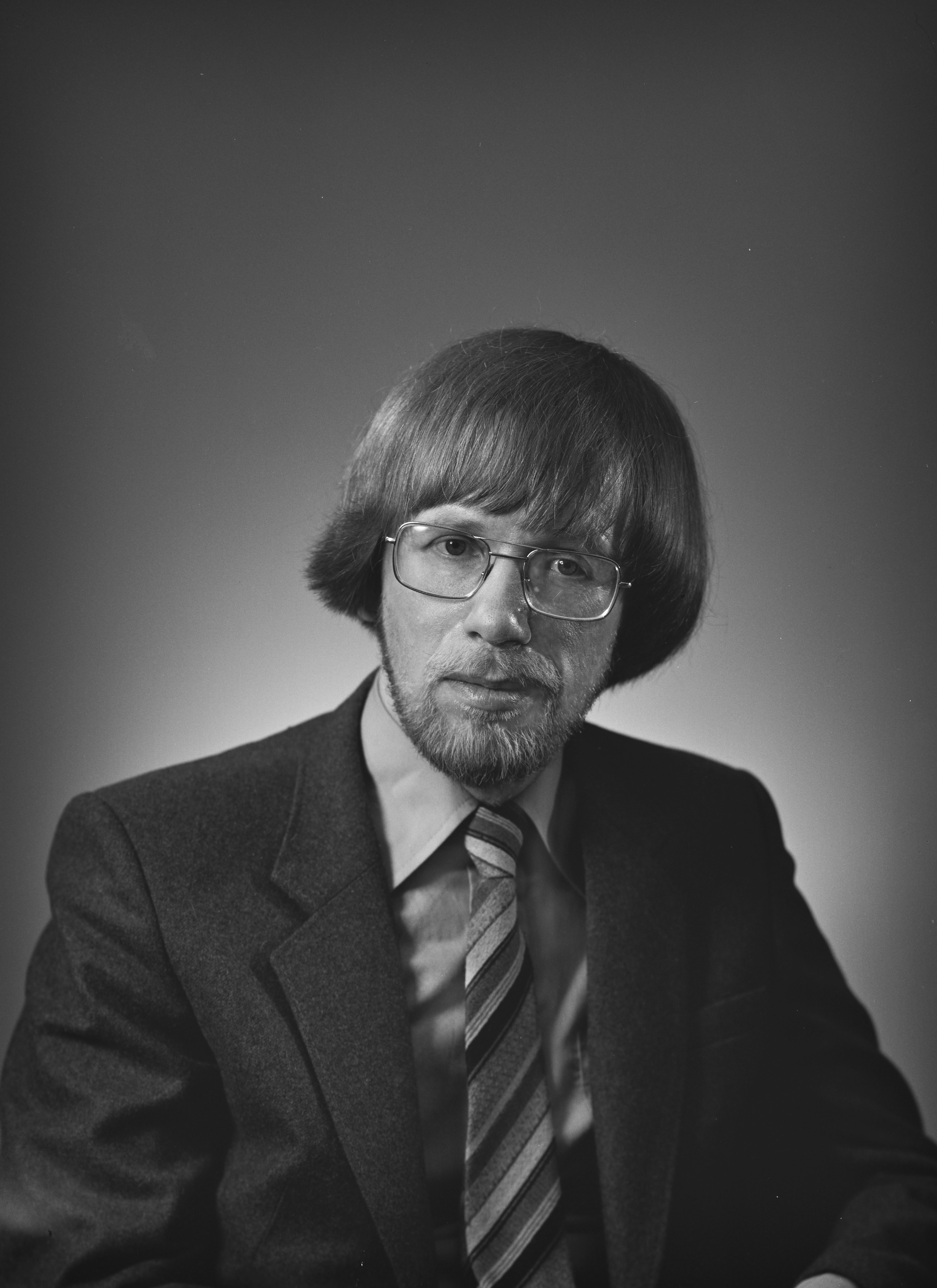
Heininen in 1982

Paavo Johannes Heininen (13 January 1938 – 18 January 2022) was a Finnish composer and pianist.

== Biography ==
He was born in Helsinki, where he studied at the Sibelius Academy and was taught composition by Aarre Merikanto, Einojuhani Rautavaara, Einar Englund, and Joonas Kokkonen. He continued his studies in Cologne with Bernd Alois Zimmermann; at the Juilliard School of Music in New York City with Vincent Persichetti and Eduard Steuermann; and privately in Poland with Witold Lutosławski. He also studied musicology at the University of Helsinki.

Heininen was one of the most important Finnish modernist composers. His works can be roughly divided into two periods: dodecaphonic (c. 1957–1975) and serialist (from 1976 onwards). Due to the hostile reactions to his early works, particularly the First Symphony, his works up to the 1980s can be roughly divided in two groups: more personal and complex pieces and more approachable, audience-friendly pieces such as the Second Symphony, "Petite symphonie joyeuse".

As professor of composition at the Sibelius Academy, Heininen has been highly influential in educating the next generation of Finnish composers and his pupils have included Magnus Lindberg, Kaija Saariaho, Jukka Tiensuu, Jouni Kaipainen and Veli-Matti Puumala.

In addition to composing original works, Heininen has reconstructed several pieces that his composition teacher Aarre Merikanto mutilated or destroyed, including the latter's Symphonic Study (1928) and String Sextet (1932) and written the violin concerto Tuuminki (A Notion) as a "re-imagining" of Merikanto's completely destroyed third violin concerto. Alongside composition, Heininen has been active as a pianist, premiering and recording several of his own works. He is also known as an essayist and has written a large number of composer portraits.

Heininen died on 18 January 2022 in Järvenpää, at the age of 84.

== Selected works ==
=== Symphonies ===
- Symphony no. 1 op. 3 (1958/60)
- Symphony no. 2 Petite symphonie joyeuse op. 9 (1962)
- Symphony no. 3 op. 20 (1969/77)
- Symphony no. 4 op. 27 (1971)
- Symphony no. 5 op. 80 (2001–02)
- Symphony no. 6 op. 132 (2015)
- Symphony no. 7 op. 144 (2020)
- Symphony no. 8 op. 145 (2021)

=== Concertos ===
- Piano concerto no. 1 op. 13 (1964)
- Piano concerto no. 2 op. 15 (1966)
- Deux chansons for cello and orchestra (or piano) op. 31 (1976)
- Piano concerto no. 3 op. 46 (1981)
- Saxophone concerto op. 50 (1983)
- Cello concerto op. 53 (1985)
- Tuuminki (A Notion) ("...of what might have been Aarre Merikanto's 3rd Violin Concerto") (1993)
- Violin concerto op. 75 (1999)
- Piano concerto no. 4 op. 81 (2001/05)
- Flute concerto Autrefois (2008/10)
- Organ concerto Aiolos op. 131 (2012)

=== Other orchestral works ===
- Tripartita op. 5 (1959)
- Concerto for string orchestra op. 6 (1959/63)
- Soggetto op. 10 (1963)
- Adagio op. 12 (1963/66)
- Arioso for strings op. 16 (1967)
- Dia op. 36 (1979)
- Tritopos op. 38 (1977)
- Attitude op. 44 (1980)
- ...tyttöjen kävely ruusulehdossa... for strings op. 47 (1982)
- Dicta kamariyhtyeelle (chamber ensemble) op. 49 (1983)
- KauToKei for strings op. 52 (1985)
- The Well-balanced Dancer op. 66a–k (1994–2000)

=== Operas ===
- Silkkirumpu (The Damask Drum) op. 45 libretto by the composer and Eeva-Liisa Manner (Finnish) and Andrew Bentley (English)
- Veitsi (The Knife) op. 55, libretto by the composer and Veijo Meri (1989)

=== Chamber music ===
- String quartet no. 1 Kwartet smyczkowy op. 32c (1974)
- String quartet no. 2 Anadyr.mpl op. 64 (1992/94)
- String quartet no. 3 Austin Flint's String Quartet op. 101 (2006)
- Quintet for flute, saxophone, piano, vibraphone and percussion op. 7 (1961)
- Musique d'été for flute, clarinet, violin, cello, cembalo, vibraphone and percussion op. 11 (1963/67)
- Sonata for violin and piano op. 25 (1970)
- Jeu I flute and piano op. 42 (1980)
- Jeu II for violin and piano op. 43 (1980)
- Short I for clarinet and cello (or solo clarinet) op. 58 (1990)
- Utazawa no e (Short II) for flute and guitar op. 61 (1991)
- Anadyr.img for saxophone quartet op. 63 (1993)
- String quintet op. 78 (2000)
- Täällä for piano and flute op. 86 (2003)
- Quincunx for piano and flute op. 88 (2002–03)
- Piano trio op. 91 (2002/03)
- Viherre for flute, clarinet, cello and accordion op. 96 (2005)
- Sonata for oboe and piano op. 106 (2008–09)
- Sonata for saxophone and piano op. 108 (2008)
- Sonaatti for two pianos op. 109 (2008–10)
- Sonata for clarinet and piano op. 111 (2008/10)
- Sykerre for wind quintet op. 113 (2010)
- Vaskikaari for brass quintet op. 115 (2010)
- Boston Sonatas op. 134 (2014)

=== Solo works ===
==== Piano ====
- Toccata op. 1 (1956)
- Sonatina 1957 op. 2 (1957)
- Libretto della primavera op. 28 (1971)
- Poesia squillante ed incandescente op. 32a (1974)
- Préludes-Études-Poèmes op. 32b (1974)
- Poésies-périphrases op. 32d (1975)
- Cinq moments de jour op. 51 (1984)
- Lamentation and Praise op. 68 (1995)
- Mazurki op. 79 (2001)

==== Organ ====
- Oculus aquilae op. 18 (1968)
- Touché op. 57 (1989)
- KotiKouluKirkko I–II op. 83 (2001–02)

==== Other ====
- Discantus I for alto flute op. 14 (1965)
- Discantus II for clarinet op. 21 (1969)
- Discantus III for saxophone op. 33 (1976)
- Cantilena II for cello op. 26 (1970)
- Cantilena III for violin op. 34 (1976)
- Touching for guitar op. 40 (1978)
- Beateth for percussion op. 48 (1982)

=== Vocal ===
- Cantico delle creature for baritone and orchestra or piano or organ op. 17 (1968)
- The Autumns for mixed choir op. 22 (1970)
- Schatten der Erde for mezzo-soprano and piano op. 30 (1973)
- Reality for solo soprano and ten instruments op. 41 (1978)
- Four Lullabies for male choir op. 56a (1986)
- Poetiikka for male choir op. 56b (1986–90)
- Tarinankulmia for mixed choir op. 67 (1994)
- Hyräilyjä for voice and piano op. 69 (1998)
- Suomalainen laulukirja (Finnish Songbook) for four voices and piano op. 82 (2006)
- Eläinten Te Deum (Animal Te Deum) for soloists, choir and orchestra
