= The Last Temptations =

1975 opera

- Opera by Joonas Kokkonen
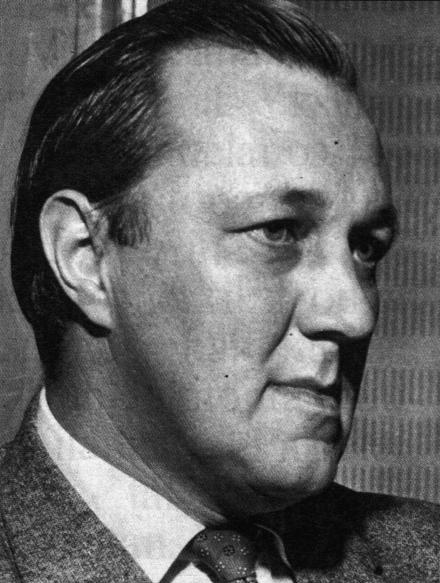
- The composer in the 1950s
- Native title: Viimeiset kiusaukset
- Librettist: Lauri Kokkonen
- Language: Finnish
- Premiere: 1975; Finnish National Opera, Helsinki

The Last Temptations (Finnish: Viimeiset kiusaukset) is an opera in two acts by Joonas Kokkonen to a libretto by Lauri Kokkonen. Along with Leevi Madetoja's Pohjalaisia and Aarre Merikanto's Juha, it is considered one of the most important Finnish operas. The opera deals with the life of the late eighteenth- and early nineteenth-century folk preacher Paavo Ruotsalainen. Kokkonen worked on the opera for 16 years before finishing the work. It was premiered in Helsinki by the Finnish National Opera in 1975.

The opera consists of two acts divided into 14 scenes. The combining element of the work is the hymn number 382 in the current Finnish hymnal of the Evangelical Lutheran Church of Finland, My Lord, my God in all distress (Finnish: Sinuhun turvaan Jumala) (382) which is a reoccurring theme throughout the opera. A chorus containing the whole hymn concludes the opera.

== Performances ==
After the premiere, the opera has already had almost three hundred performances. Finnish National Opera toured with the work in seven cities abroad – including at New York's Metropolitan Opera. At the Finnish National Opera there have been three productions: 1975–1983 (directed by Sakari Puurunen) and 1994 (directed by Paavo Liski) and 2001 (directed by Jussi Tapola).

The Savonlinna Opera Festival performed the opera for several years, 1977–1980. In Helsinki and Savonlinna the most famous singers in the role of Paavo were Martti Talvela and Jaakko Ryhänen.

=== Later performances ===
- In 2007 the opera was performed as a half-staged production in the Temppeliaukio church in Helsinki four times.
- Finnish film director Åke Lindman directed The Last Temptations on the original homestead of Paavo Ruotsalainen in Aholansaari, Nilsiä, Finland during four summers in 2000–2003 from where the production was transferred to new outdoor arena in Nilsiä to be performed in summer 2007.
- A renewed full-scale production of the opera saw light in summer 2009 in Nivala, Finland. In the roles were baritone Esa Ruuttunen as Paavo, soprano Johanna Rusanen-Kartano as Riitta, Petri Pussila as the smith and Lassi Virtanen, first man.
- In 2015 production by Pohjois-Kymi music school. Esa Ruuttunen sang the role of Paavo Ruotsalainen.
- Opera Jyväskylä (Jyväskylän ooppera) prepared performances of the opera for 2022, conducted by Ville Matvejeff.
- In 2022 the opera was revived in Aholansaari - the original homestead of Paavo Ruotsalainen - with Esa Ruuttunen and Varvara Merras-Häyrynen. The work was performed with piano and organ accompaniment.
- The opera is performed at Tampere Concert Hall (Tamperetalo) in March 2025.
- The Savonlinna festival presented a new production in July 2025 directed by Mika Kouki, conducted by Ville Matvejeff with Mika Kares leading the cast and Silja Aalto as Riita.

== Roles ==
- Paavo Ruotsalainen, Finnish farmer, leader of religious revival – bass
- Riitta, Paavo's first wife – soprano
- Juhana, Paavo's and Riitta's son – tenor
- Jaakko Högman, smith who converted Paavo – bass
- First man – tenor
- Second man – baritone
- Third man – bass
- First woman – soprano
- Second woman – mezzo-soprano
- Third woman – alto
- Anna Loviisa, Paavo's second wife – speaking role
- Albertiina Nenonen, servant – speaking role
- Shadow – Dancer
- people – chorus

== Synopsis ==
=== Act I ===
Scene 1: Paavo's Deathbed

On a stormy winter night Paavo tosses on his bed in fever. He calls for Riitta, his deceased first wife. His second wife Anna Loviisa and servant Albertiina enter. They try to comfort Paavo by singing his favorite hymn. Paavo sobers up but shouting orders the women to leave for, as he says, to Heaven's gate he must go alone.

Interlude I

Scene 2: Riitta at the Dance

Paavo relives in his hallucinations key events of his life. In his youth he meets Riitta at a dance. Three men and three women mock him and warn Riitta not to go with Paavo, a madman, for it will only bring her misery. Nevertheless, Riitta decides to go with Paavo. Riitta calls for Paavo and encourages him, but he refuses and says that he must go the barrier of Heaven alone.

Interlude II

Scene 3: The Smith

Riitta takes Paavo to visit the smith who had instilled faith in him in his youth, blacksmith Jaakko (Jakob) Högman. Riitta accuses the blacksmith for compelling Paavo to wander around in revivalist meetings, leaving family behind to starve. The blacksmith retorts contemptuously to Riitta, but then adds that the gate of Heaven is open to those who suffer and toil. Paavo mutters that he is too weak to open the gate.

Interlude III

Scene 4: The Frost

Paavo and Riitta are at their first homestead by the lake. Paavo promises to build a new house, but a wicker gate ominously reminds him of the Barrier of Heaven which he dare not approach. The chorus comments how Paavo took Riitta to the backwoods to a life of misery. The white frost suddenly rises, threatening the crop. Riitta and Paavo together try to fight it to no use. In the struggle to move the air on the field they trample their baby underfoot.

Interlude IV

Scene 5: Juhana

Paavo's son Juhana is repairing his father's knapsack. Juhana is longing to get away from the dreary existence to a wider world. He dances at the thought and teases his mother. She snatches the knapsack away to hide it from Paavo, to keep him from leaving the family for his travels.

Interlude V

Scene 6: The Last Loaf

Paavo demands his knapsack back. Riitta shouts back complaining about him always wandering, not caring for work or family. Riitta threatens to kill Paavo to spare him the shame of starving his family. She hurls the axe at him, but misses. Paavo tries to explain and reconcile the needs of the family and the overriding importance of spreading the Gospel. He thinks that what he has done was in vain. He calls out for Riitta, but cannot find her.

Interlude VI

Scene 7: Juhana's Death Revealed

Village women come to the house. They look at the dent left by the axe Riitta threw at Paavo. They tell her in a roundabout way that Juhana has been murdered. They wonder why Riitta does not weep. She replies that she wept for him for three whole years. Paavo has been listening, and cries that all his life God has been scourging and punishing him with an iron whip, and he has deserved it.

Interlude VII

Scene 8: Riitta's Death

Riitta is dying three years later. She feels calm and remembers the happy illusion of the first homestead on the island, where Paavo used to sing thanks to God's blessings. Paavo is surprised: Riitta can give thanks. Yes, she replies, and sees the barrier of Heaven open in front of her. She asks Paavo to recite a thanksgiving hymn. He sings and Juhana joins in. Riitta rises and goes toward her son to Heaven's door.

=== Act II ===
Scene 1: The Assizes

Three men want to confound Paavo at the place where he once had to defend himself at the Assizes against charges of undermining the authority of the Church. They feed Paavo's depression and reveal themselves as his enemies. They humiliate his arrogance and taunt him with dancing girls. Paavo collapses in despair, but the chorus sings a hymn of encouragement.

Interlude I

Scene 2: The Fisherman

Riitta appears, calling Paavo to the Island. Paavo insists his calling to speak to the nation. "Into the sea of men I cast a net all flaming with it I search for sinful wretches.." Riitta repeats the call, but he insists he must speak at the graduation ceremony in Helsinki.

Interlude II

Scene 3: The Graduation

At the University graduation Paavo wants to go as an invited guest, but three men and three women stop him. They tell him he is uneducated idiot who has no business at the University ceremony. Paavo retorts that he has read religious tracts since he was a boy. He hears his own hymn sung and tries to address the academics. Paavo tries to follow the Bishop of the North, but is rejected. He calls out a prayer.

Interlude III

Scene 4: The Call to the Island

Riitta calls Paavo to the Island. He resists. He doubts he would be welcome. Finally he yields to Riitta's pleas, but objecting he is but a wretched sinner.

Interlude IV

Scene 5: The Dead

Paavo is praying for forgiveness. The blacksmith appears, encouraging him, then Riitta with a thanksgiving, then Juhana, singing the Lord's Prayer. It is time for Paavo to settle accounts of his life. His time has come.

Interlude V

Scene 6: Paavo's Death

Paavo is lying on his bed in the cottage. He is still tossing around and crying. Gradually he comes round, surrounded by family. The three men and three women who have tormented him turn out to be his daughters and their husbands. Paavo recognizes that his time has come. He makes sure that his will is in order, and tells his family to plant a prickly tree on his grave, for he has been the prickliest of men. He asks the servant to read to him from the favorite tract, and begins to sing his hymn. Everyone gradually joins in; Paavo goes quiet and listens. He hear Riitta in the distance, calling him to the Island. Paavo praises God. He knows that he has overcome.

== Recording ==
1990 (Original release 1978). Martti Talvela, Ritva Auvinen, Seppo Ruohonen, Matti Lehtinen, Kalevi Koskinen, Jorma Falck, Jaakko Ryhänen, Taru Valjakka, Eini Liukko-Vaara, Raija Määttänen-Falck. Chorus and Orchestra of the Savonlinna Opera Festival. Chorus master Kyösti Haatanen. Conductor Ulf Söderblom. Finlandia Records. 1576-51104-2.
