= Martti Talvela =

Finnish opera singer

- Martti Talvela

Background information
- Born: Martti Olavi Talvela; 4 February 1935; Hiitola, Finland
- Died: 23 July 1989 (aged 54) Juva, Finland
- Occupation: operatic bass
- Years active: 1960–1989

Martti Olavi Talvela (4 February 1935 – 23 July 1989) was a Finnish operatic bass.

Born in Hiitola, Finland (now in the Republic of Karelia), the eighth of ten children he studied in Lahti and Stockholm, and made his operatic debut in Helsinki in 1960 as Sparafucile. He trained as a boxer in his youth and developed the stamina necessary for the biggest roles.

Originally Talvela was educated as a primary school teacher in Savonlinna, Eastern Finland (1952–1956), and he worked in that occupation at three schools (1957–1960). He sang at the Stockholm Royal Opera in Sweden from 1961 to 1962, before becoming a regularly employed singer at the Deutsche Oper of Berlin in 1962, the same year as his debut at Bayreuth.

In 1970, the Senate (government) of West Berlin formally granted him the rank of Kammersänger. He was especially acclaimed as the title character in Boris Godunov, a role he performed 39 times at the Metropolitan Opera between 1974 and 1987, and as Pimen from the same work, as Paavo Ruotsalainen in The Last Temptations, as a Wagner singer who frequently performed at Bayreuth (King Marke, Hunding, Fasolt, Fafner, Hagen (one critic described his Hagen as an "elemental force") and Titurel), as the Commendatore, Sarastro, Dosefei, and Prince Gremin, as King Phillip II, the Grand Inquisitor and, in the later part of his career, the title character in Glinka's Ivan Susanin.

As his final record he left, terribly thinned out by illness, a warm and heartfelt version of Schubert's Winterreise. He left at least two recorded performances of Mussorgsky's Songs and Dances of Death – one with full orchestra and one with piano accompaniment. In his prime Talvela made a shattering impact not only on the opera stage but also as an ardent interpreter of Lieder. After a recital given by Talvela and Ralf Gothoni in London's Royal Festival Hall in July 1974 (which included Brahms' Vier Ernste Gesänge), a critic with the Financial Times likened Talvela's appearance to an Old Testament prophet and his voice to granite, describing how this Finnish bass giant captivated his audience with thunderstorms, prayers and invocations. Referring to the same recital, the respected critic John Steane wrote, "For at least one member of the audience on that occasion the great and irreplaceable feature of the recital was the sheer magnificence of voice."

Standing at 6 feet 8 inches (203 cm) tall and weighing nearly 300 pounds (140 kg), Talvela possessed a "voice of immense size and wide range" and was able to bring to his roles a combination of "grandeur and gentleness".

He can be seen performing on video as Boris Godunov, as Sarastro, as Osmin, as the Grand Inquisitor (in German) and as Don Fernando, and in the CBS special Beethoven's Birthday: A Celebration in Vienna, released on DVD as Bernstein on Beethoven: A Celebration in Vienna.

Talvela was the first artistic leader of the Savonlinna Opera Festival in Finland, from 1972 to 1979, and had been appointed general director of the National Opera in Helsinki just before his death.

In 1973 he received the Pro Finlandia Medal of the Order of the Lion of Finland.

During the last eight years of his life (1981–1989), he worked as a farmer on the Inkilänhovi (Inkilä manor) farm in Juva, Eastern Finland, while continuing his official career as an opera singer. His health had begun to decline in 1975, when he was diagnosed with diabetes and gout. In 1982 alone, he suffered two heart attacks at the Metropolitan Opera. Stomach problems also plagued him at times in the 1980s.

== Death ==
Talvela died of a heart attack at age 54 while dancing at his daughter's wedding in Juva.
