= Matti Salminen =

Finnish operatic bass, now retired (born 1945)

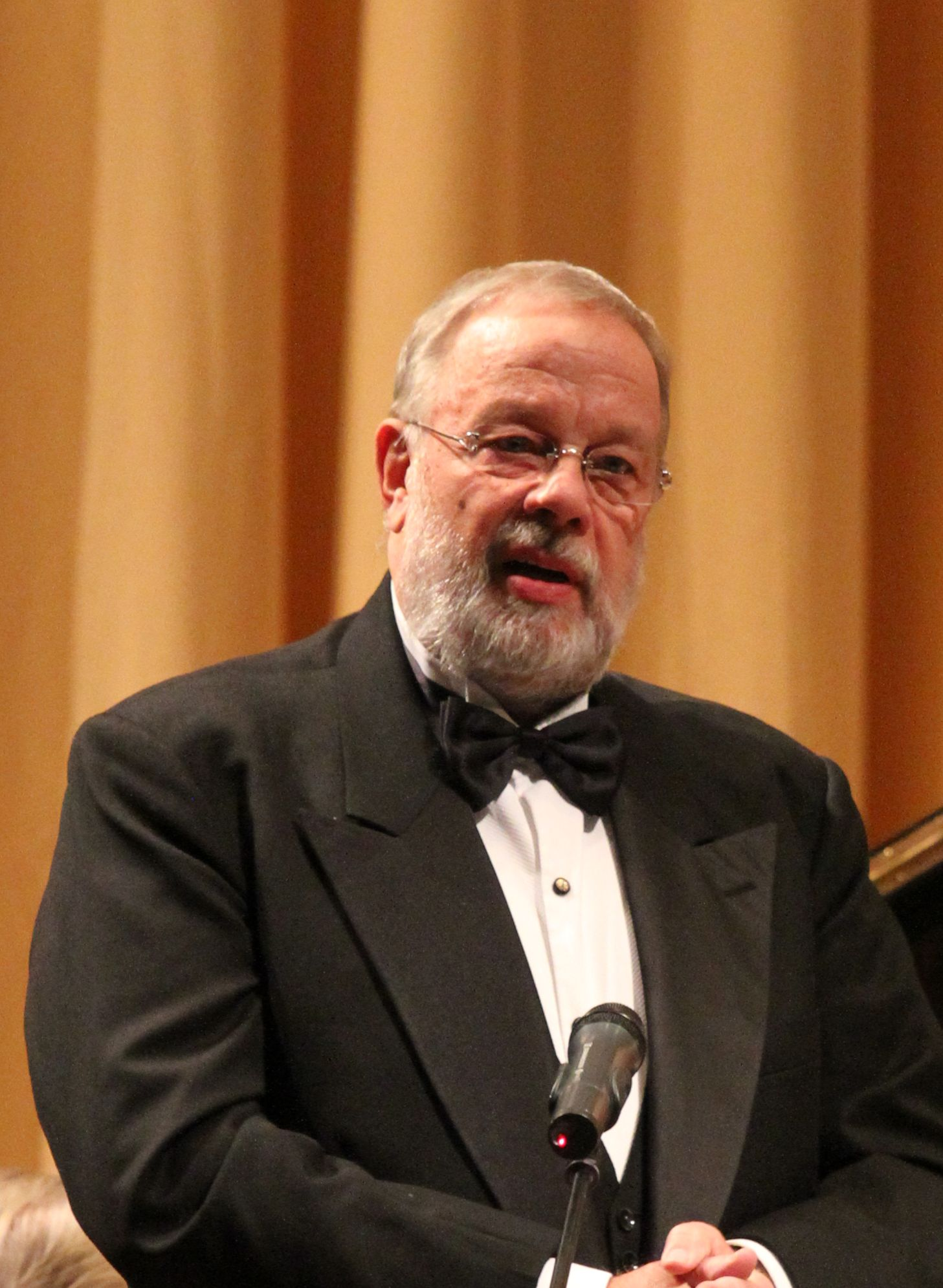
Matti Salminen in 2009

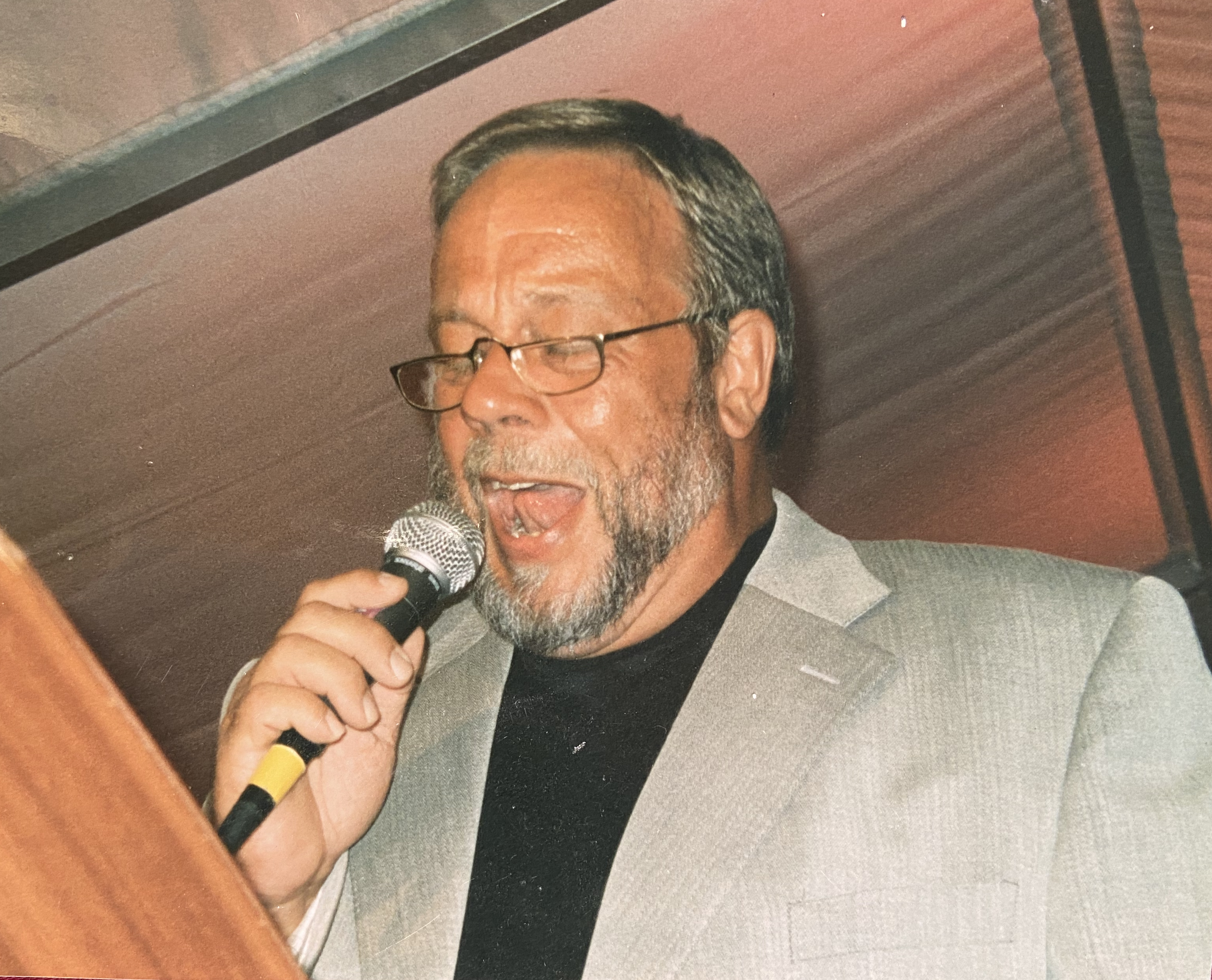
Matti Salminen singing Finnish tangos in Helsinki; July, 1997

Matti Kalervo Salminen (born 7 July 1945) is a Finnish operatic bass, now retired, who has sung at the most important opera houses of the world, including the Metropolitan and Bayreuth Festival. He is distinguished by an imposing figure and height (6' 5"), a cavernous, heavy, dark voice with an expansive upper register, and an expressive face. According to one reviewer, in his prime, Salminen was "... simply the largest bass voice in captivity. It is not just its roar in powering over Wagner's maximum orchestra, but the way he carves the sonority and forms the color."

Salminen has a special gift for playing menacing, threatening characters. He performed as Fafner and Hagen in the PBS video broadcast Ring Cycle from the Metropolitan Opera, for the largest viewing audience of the Ring in history.

== Biography ==
Salminen was born in Turku. In his youth, he earned money for voice lessons by singing Finnish tangos in nightclubs. He has published an anthology of Finnish tangos. He first caught the public eye as a lucky understudy in the role of King Philip II, when he was just 24 years old. He continued performing this role until (almost) the end of his career; a DVD was released in 2014.

Salminen is a widely videotaped singing actor with three different performances as Hagen available on DVD; also two performances as the Commendatore, several as Sarastro, two as Hunding and two as Daland. Videotaped performances and films are also available as King Phillip II, the Grand Inquisitor, Seneca, Gurnemanz, Pogner, King Marke, Kaspar, Rasputin, Boris Godunov, and Prince Ivan Khovansky.

At the Bayreuth Festival he first appeared in 1976 as Titurel (Parsifal), Hunding (Die Walküre), and Fasolt (Das Rheingold) in the Jahrhundertring (Centenary Ring) in 1976, celebrating the centenary of both the festival and the first performance of the complete cycle, conducted by Pierre Boulez and staged by Patrice Chéreau, recorded and filmed in 1979 and 1980. He continued until 1989 adding Fafner (Das Rheingold, Siegfried), Daland (Der fliegende Holländer), King Marke (Tristan und Isolde), Heinrich (Lohengrin), Pogner (Die Meistersinger von Nürnberg), Landgraf (Tannhäuser) and Hagen (Götterdämmerung) to his roles there. He made his Metropolitan Opera debut as King Marke on 9 January 1981, and performed 132 times there in several roles, until 28 March 2008.

He sang in the premiere of Sallinen's Kuningas Lear in 2000 (King Lear, title role), and Jukka Linkola's Robin Hood in 2011 (Sheriff).

Aside from operatic roles, Salminen also performs in sacred music and concert recitals. He gave a farewell concert at the Zürich Opera House in December 2016.

== Awards and honors ==
- Salminen has won two Grammy Awards for Best Opera Recording, in 1982 and 1991, both for recordings of Wagner.
- In 2017, Salminen received the ICMA Lifetime Achievement Award.
- In 1988 he received the Pro Finlandia Medal of the Order of the Lion of Finland.
- He was recognized with the title Kammersänger in three times: in Berlin in 1995, and in Bavaria and Austria in 2003.

== See also ==
- Finnish opera
- Music of Finland
