= Joonas Kokkonen =

Finnish composer (1921–1996)

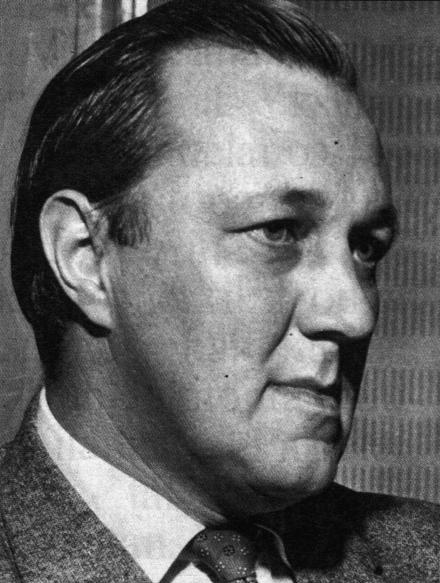
- Joonas Kokkonen in the 1950s.
- Born: November 13, 1921. Iisalmi, Finland
- Died: October 2, 1996 (aged 74); Järvenpää, Finland
- Occupation: composer
- Known for: symphonies opera
- Notable work: Viimeiset kiusaukset
- Spouses: Maire Mäkinen (m. 1943; div. 1953) Else-Maj Heljo (m. 1954; died 1979) Anita Pakomaa (m. 1980)
- Children: 5

Joonas Kokkonen (pronounced [ˈjoːnɑs ˈkokːonen]; 13 November 1921 – 2 October 1996) was a Finnish composer. He was one of the most internationally famous Finnish composers of the 20th century after Sibelius; his opera The Last Temptations has received over 500 performances worldwide, and is considered by many to be Finland's most distinguished national opera.

== Life ==
Kokkonen was born in Iisalmi, Finland, but spent the latter part of his life in Järvenpää at his home, which was known as Villa Kokkonen, designed by architect Alvar Aalto and completed in 1969. He served in the Finnish army during World War II with great distinction. He received his education at the University of Helsinki, and later at the Sibelius Academy, where he afterwards taught composition; his students there included Aulis Sallinen. In addition to his activities as a composer, he made a significant and powerful impact on Finnish cultural life, serving as a chairman and organizer, heading organizations such as Society of Finnish Composers, the Board of the Concert Centre, and others. His purpose was always to improve music education, as well as the status and appreciation of classical music as well as Finnish music. In the 1960s and early 1970s he won numerous prizes for his work. He was appointed to the Finnish Academy upon the death of Uuno Klami. His composition activity slowed down greatly after the death of his wife and increased alcohol consumption. A long planned Fifth Symphony was never written down.

Kokkonen's date of death has been variously reported as having occurred on 1, 2, or 20 October 1996. According to Kokkonen's biographer Pekka Hako, the composer died in the early morning hours of October 2.

== Music and influence ==
Although Kokkonen studied at the Sibelius Academy, he was mainly self-taught in composition. Usually his compositions are divided into three style periods: a neoclassical early style from 1948 to 1958, a relatively short middle period twelve-tone style from 1959 to 1966, and a late "neo-Romantic" style of free tonality which also used aspects of his earlier style periods, which began in 1967 and lasted for the rest of his life.

Most of his early music is chamber music, and includes a Piano Trio and a Piano Quintet; the style is contrapuntal and influenced by the works of Béla Bartók, as well as Renaissance and Baroque music. In the second style period he wrote the first two of his four symphonies. Although he used twelve-tone technique, he avoided orthodoxy by occasionally using triads and octaves; he also liked to use the row melodically, giving the successive pitches in the same tone color (many other composers of 12-tone music split the row between different voices).

It was in the third stylistic period that Kokkonen composed the music that earned him international recognition: the last two symphonies, the ...durch einen Spiegel for twelve solo strings, the Requiem, and the opera The Last Temptations (1975) (Viimeiset kiusaukset), based on the life and death of the Finnish Revivalist preacher Paavo Ruotsalainen. The opera is punctuated with chorales which refer back to Johann Sebastian Bach, and which are also reminiscent of the African-American spirituals used for a similar purpose in Michael Tippett's oratorio A Child of Our Time. The opera was staged at the Metropolitan Opera in New York in 1983.

== Works ==
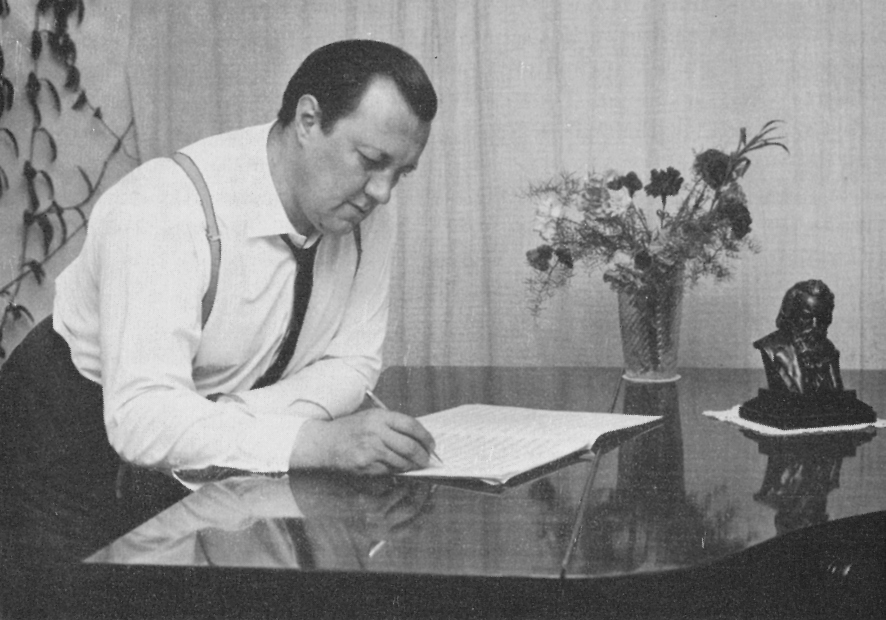
Kokkonen working on his First Symphony in 1959.

=== Opera ===
- The Last Temptations (1972–1975)

=== Orchestral ===
- Symphonies
  - Symphony No. 1 (1960)
  - Symphony No. 2 (1960–61)
  - Symphony No. 3 (1967)
  - Symphony No. 4 (1971)
- Music for String Orchestra (1957)
- Opus Sonorum (1964)
- Symphonic Sketches (1968)
- Inauguratio (1971)
- ...durch einem Spiegel (1977)
- Il passagio (1987)
- Interludes from The Last Temptations (1977)

=== Concertante ===
- Cello Concerto (1969)

=== Chamber ===
- Piano Trio (1948)
- Piano Quintet (1951–53)
- Duo for Violin and Piano (1955)
- String Quartet No. 1 (1959)
- Sinfonia da camera (1961–62)
- String Quartet No. 2 (1966)
- Wind Quintet (1973)
- Cello Sonata (1975–76)
- String Quartet No. 3 (1976)
- Improvisazione for violin & piano (1982)

=== Piano ===
- Impromptu (1938)
- Pielavesi Suite (1939)
- Two Small Preludes (1943)
- Piano Sonatina (1953)
- Religioso (1956)
- Bagatelles (1969)

=== Organ ===
- Lux aeterna (1974)
- Hääsoitto (Wedding music)
- Iuxta Crucem
- Surusoitto (Funeral Music)

=== Vocal ===
- Three Songs to Poems by Einari Vuorela (1947)
- Illat Song Cycle (1955)
- Three Children's Christmas Songs (1956–58)
- Hades of the Birds, song cycle for soprano and orchestra (1959)
- Two Monologues from The Last Temptations, for bass and orchestra (1975)

=== Choral ===
- Missa a capella (1963)
- Laudatio Domini (1966)
- Erekhteion, academic cantata (1970)
- Ukko-Paavon Virsi for chorus (1978)
- Requiem (1979–81)
- With his fingers Väinämöinen played for male chorus (1985)
