= A History of Clouds =

2003 poetry collection by Hans Magnus Enzensberger

- Original German language edition Die Geschichte der Wolken. 99 Meditationen (2003)
- Author: Hans Magnus Enzensberger
- Original title: Die Geschichte der Wolken
- Translator: Martin Chalmers; Esther Kinsky
- Language: German
- Publisher: Suhrkamp Verlag
- Publication date: 17 March 2003
- Publication place: Germany
- English publication date: August 2018
- Pages: 149
- ISBN: 978-3-518-41391-3

A History of Clouds: 99 Meditations (German: Die Geschichte der Wolken. 99 Meditationen) is a 2003 poetry collection by the German writer Hans Magnus Enzensberger. It consists of 99 poems that celebrate the routines of everyday life against a backdrop of 20th-century history and politics.
