= Kiosk (disambiguation) =

A kiosk is a small enclosed structure, often freestanding, open on one or both sides or with a window, used as a booth to sell newspapers, tobacco, coffee, food and drink, etc. or to dispense information.

Kiosk may also refer to:

== Arts and entertainment ==
- KIOSK, an art, design, and architecture magazine
- Kiosk (band), an Iranian rock band
- Kiosk (poetry collection), a 1995 poetry collection by Hans Magnus Enzensberger
- Kiosk (TV), a former Scandinavian pay-per-view service available on Canal Digital's satellite platform

== Buildings ==
- Cleopatra's Kiosk a small building and shop on the Victoria Embankment, London, England
- K67 kiosk, a kiosk design, designed in 1966 by the Slovenian architect Saša J. Mächtig
- Food kiosk, a temporary structure used to prepare and sell food to the public
- Mall kiosk, a small enclosed store where an internal operator serves outside customers across a counter.

== Technology ==
- Interactive kiosk, a computer terminal that provides information access via electronic methods
- Kiosk hacking a practice of bypassing the security restrictions of kiosk software
- Kiosk software a system and user interface software designed for a kiosk or Internet kiosk

== Other uses ==
- Kiosk, Ontario, Canada, a former community on Kioshkokwi Lake in northern Algonquin Park
