= Popescu Prize =

- Sponsored by: Ratiu Foundation (since 2003)
- Country: United Kingdom
- Presented by: The Poetry Society
- Formerly called: European Poetry Translation Prize (1983–1997) * Corneliu M Popescu Prize (2003, 2005)
- Reward: £1,500
- Established: 1983
- Website: http://www.poetrysociety.org.uk/content/competitions/popescu/

The Popescu Prize is a biennial poetry award established in 1983. It is given by the Poetry Society for a volume of poetry translated from a European language into English. Formerly called the European Poetry Translation Prize (1983–1997), the prize was relaunched in 2003, renamed in memory of the Romanian translator Corneliu M. Popescu, who died at age 19 in 1977 and was known as the Corneliu M Popescu Prize that year and in 2005. Popescu translated the work of one of Romania's leading poets, Mihai Eminescu, into English. The prize of £1,500 is awarded to a translator. Financial support has been provided by the Ratiu Foundation since 2003 (the Foundation was established in London in 1979 by Ion and Elisabeth Ratiu to promote and support projects which further education and research in the culture and history of Romania). The award has not been run since 2015.

The Encyclopedia of Literary Translation into English (2000) considered the European Poetry Translation Prize one of the most "prestigious" translation awards.

== European Poetry Translation Prize ==
- 1983: The Oresteia, Tony Harrison
- 1985: Michael Hamburger
- 1987: Ewald Osers
- 1989: David Luke
- 1991: Francis R. Jones
- 1993: Paul Lawton
- 1995: George Szirtes
- 1997: David Constantine and Francis R. Jones

== Popescu Prize ==
- 2003: David Constantine for translation of Lighter than Air by Hans Magnus Enzensberger
- 2005: Adam J. Sorkin & Lidia Vianu for translation of The Bridge by Marin Sorescu
- 2007: Ilmar Lehtpere for translation of The Drums of Silence by Kristiina Ehin
- 2009: Randall Couch for translation of Madwomen by Gabriela Mistral
- 2011: Judith Wilkinson for translation of Raptors by Toon Tellegen
- 2013: Alice Oswald, for Memorial, based on the Illiad by Homer
- 2015: Iain Galbraith for translation of Self-Portrait with a Swarm of Bees by Jan Wagner

The award has not been run since 2015.
