= Mausoleum (disambiguation) =

A mausoleum is a building enclosung a burial chamber.

Mausoleum or mausolea may also refer to:

- Mausoleum: Thirty Seven Ballads from the History of Progress, a 1975 poetry collection by Hans Magnus Enzensberger
- Mausoleum (film), a 1983 American horror film
- Mausoleum (album), a 2016 live album by Myrkur
- Mausolea eriocarpa, a genus of flowering plants
- Mausoleum Records, a Belgian heavy metal record label
