= David Constantine =

English poet, author and translator

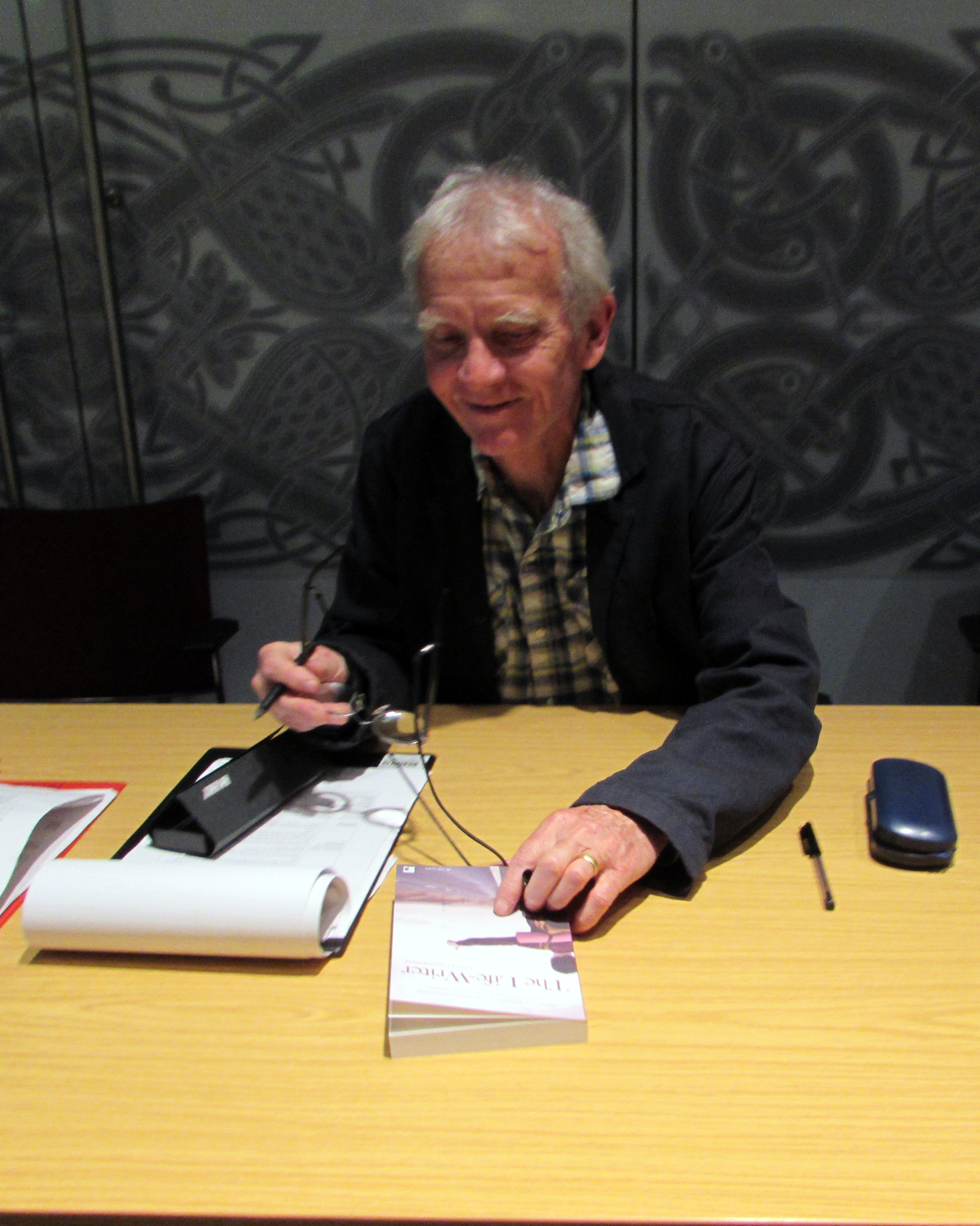
David Constantine at Durham Book Festival in 2015

David John Constantine (born 1944) is an English poet, short story writer, novelist, and translator.

== Life and career ==
Born in Salford, Constantine read Modern Languages at Wadham College, Oxford, where he also completed his DPhil on the poetry of Friedrich Hölderlin. From 1969 to 1981, he lectured in German at Durham University. In 1981, he took up a fellowship in German at The Queen's College, Oxford, becoming a supernumerary fellow in 2000.

He was a literary editor of The Oxford Magazine and from 2004 to 2013 was the co-editor, with Helen Constantine, of the literary journal Modern Poetry in Translation. Along with the Irish poet Bernard O'Donoghue, he became commissioning editor of the Oxford Poets imprint of Carcanet Press in 2000 and has been a chief judge for the T. S. Eliot Prize.

His collections of poetry include Madder, Watching for Dolphins, Caspar Hauser, The Pelt of Wasps, Something for the Ghosts, Collected Poems and Nine Fathom Deep. He was awarded the Queen's Gold Medal for Poetry in 2020.

He is a translator of Hölderlin, Brecht, Goethe, Kleist, Michaux and Jaccottet. In 2024 he published A Bird Called Elaeus, his translation and arrangement of poems from the Greek Anthology. He won the Popescu Prize for translation in 2003 and was shortlisted in 2015.

Constantine has published six collections of short stories, plus a selected volume. In 2013, his collection Tea at the Midland and Other Stories won the Frank O'Connor International Short Story Award, making Constantine the first English writer to win this award. The title story from this collection won the BBC National Short Story Award in 2010. His other collections of short stories include Under the Dam (2005), The Shieling (2009), which was shortlisted for the Frank O'Connor International Short Story Award, and The Dressing-Up Box and Other Stories (2019).

Constantine's short story "In Another Country", from Under the Dam, was adapted for film as 45 Years. Released in 2015, the film stars Tom Courtenay and Charlotte Rampling. It won the Michael Powell Award for Best British Feature Film at the Edinburgh International Film Festival and Best British/Irish Film at the London Film Critics' Circle awards. Rampling was nominated for an Academy Award for her performance.

Constantine is also author of two novels, Davies and The Life-Writer, and a biography, Fields of Fire: A Life of Sir William Hamilton.

== Awards and honours ==
- 2002 Whitbread Poetry Prize, shortlist, Watching for Dolphins
- 2003 Popescu Prize, translation of Hans Magnus Enzensberger's Lighter than Air
- 2007 Elected Fellow of the Royal Society of Literature
- 2010 Frank O'Connor International Short Story Award, shortlist, The Shieling
- 2010 BBC National Short Story Award, "Tea at the Midland"
- 2013 Frank O'Connor International Short Story Award, Tea at the Midland and Other Stories
- 2020 Queen's Gold Medal for Poetry

== Bibliography ==
=== Poetry ===
- A Brightness to Cast Shadows (1980), Bloodaxe Books, ISBN 9780906427156
- Watching for Dolphins (1983)
- Selected Poems (1991)
- Caspar Hauser (1994)
- The Pelt of Wasps (1998)
- Something for the Ghosts (2002)
- Nine Fathoms Deep (2009)
- Elder (2014)
- Belongings (2020)

=== Short stories ===
- Back at the Spike (1994)
- Under the Dam (2005)
- The Shieling (2009)
- Tea at the Midland and Other Stories (2012)
- In Another Country: Selected Stories (2015)
- The Dressing-Up Box and Other Stories (2019)
- Rivers of the Unspoilt World (2022)

=== Novels ===
- Davies (1985)
- The Life-Writer (2015)

=== Criticism ===
- Early Greek Travellers and the Hellenic Ideal (1984)
- Poetry: The Literary Agenda (2013)

=== Translations ===
- Bertolt Brecht: The Antigone of Sophocles
- The Collected Poems of Bertolt Brecht (translated with Tom Kuhn)
- Hans Magnus Enzensberger: Lighter than Air
- Hans Magnus Enzensberger: New Selected Poems
- Johann Wolfgang von Goethe: The Sorrows of Young Werther
- Johann Wolfgang von Goethe: Faust, Part 1
- Johann Wolfgang von Goethe: Faust, Part 2
- Johann Wolfgang von Goethe: Elective Affinities
- Friedrich Hölderlin: Sophocles: Oedipus and Antigone
- Friedrich Hölderlin: Selected Poems
- Philippe Jaccottet: Under Clouded Skies & Beauregard (translated with Mark Treharne)
- Heinrich von Kleist: Selected Writings
- Henri Michaux: Spaced, Displaced (translated with Helen Constantine)
- A Bird Called Elaeus: poems for here and now from The Greek Anthology

== Reviews ==
- Hearn, Sheila G. (1981), review of A Brightness to Cast Shadows, in Murray, Glen (ed.), Cencrastus No. 5, Summer 1981, pp. 51
