= Martin Chalmers =

British translator (1948–2014)

Martin Chalmers (11 November 1948 – 22 October 2014) was a British translator, particularly of works in German. He was awarded the Schlegel-Tieck Prize by the Society of Authors. He was married to the German author Esther Kinsky.

== Translations ==
- Günter Wallraff: Lowest of the Low (Ganz unten). Methuen, 1988
- Herta Müller: The Passport (Der Mensch ist ein großer Fasan auf der Welt). Serpent's Tail, 1989
- Hans Magnus Enzensberger: Europe, Europe! (Ach Europa!). Pantheon Books, 1989
- Elfriede Jelinek: Women as Lovers. Serpent's Tail, 1994
- Victor Klemperer: I Will Bear Witness: A Diary of the Nazi Years, Modern Library, 1999 (in two volumes)
- Bertolt Brecht: Stories of Mr. Keuner (Geschichten vom Herrn Keuner). City Lights Books, 2001
- Alexander Kluge: The Devil's Blind Spot. New Directions, 2004 (with Michael Hulse)
- Elfriede Jelinek: Greed. Serpent's Tail, 2006
- Erich Hackl: The Wedding in Auschwitz (Die Hochzeit von Auschwitz). Serpent's Tail, 2009
- Hans Magnus Enzensberger: A History of Clouds. Seagull Books, 2010 (transl. with Esther Kinsky)
- Thomas Bernhard: Prose. Seagull Books, 2010
- Esther Kinsky: Summer Resort (Sommerfrische). Seagull Books, 2011
- Hans Magnus Enzensberger: Brussels, the Gentle Monster (Sanftes Monster Brüssel oder die Entmündigung Europas). University of Chicago Press, 2011
- Ulrich Peltzer: Part of the Solution (Teil der Lösung). Seagull Books, 2011
- Alexander Kluge: December, Seagull Books, 2012
- Alexander Kluge: Air Raid (Der Luftangriff auf Halberstadt am 8. April 1945). Seagull Books, 2014
- Sherko Fatah: The Dark Ship (Das dunkle Schiff). Seagull Books, 2015
