= James Brockway =

English poet

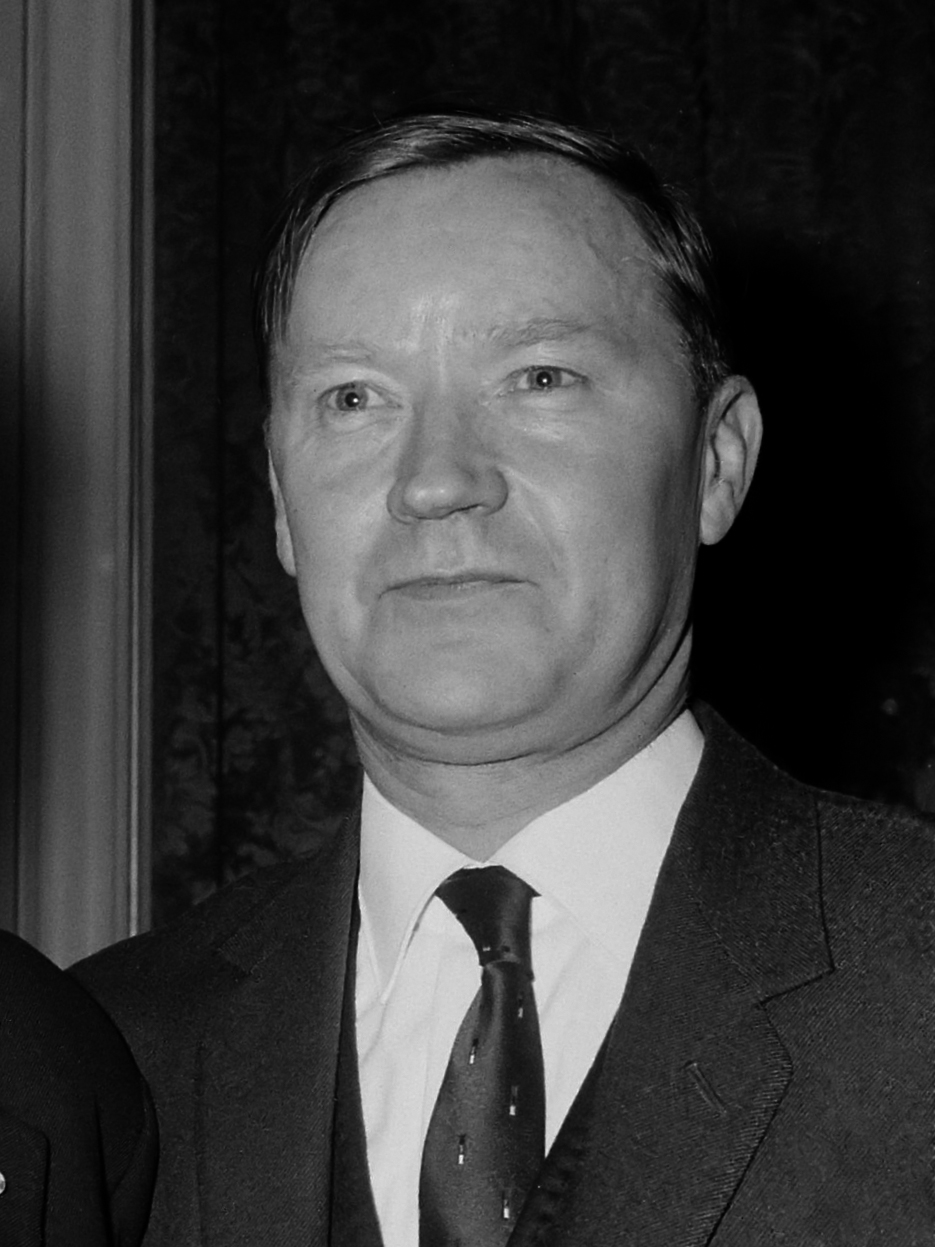
James Brockway (1966)

James Brockway (21 October 1916 – 15 December 2000) was an English poet and translator, who was born in Birmingham and migrated to The Hague, the Netherlands, where he died.

== Biography ==
The youngest son of a Birmingham industrialist, Brockway joined the civil service in 1935 and the following year went to study at the London School of Economics. By 1940 he had joined the R.A.F. and during the war saw active service in Africa, Egypt, Arabia and Burma, achieving the rank of flight lieutenant.

In 1946 he emigrated to the Netherlands, where he had made friends, and there he began to translate English novels into Dutch, including works by Alan Sillitoe, Muriel Spark and Iris Murdoch His first poetry collection, No Summer Song, appeared in 1949. He also contributed widely to Dutch newspapers and literary periodicals and, from 1960 onwards, was publishing English translations of modern Dutch poets and placing them in British literary magazines.

In 1964 he moved back to England, continuing his literary work there until 1970, when he returned to the Netherlands. By the late 1990s he had placed at least 700 translations of Dutch poetry in English-language magazines. In 1966 he received the Martinus Nijhoff Prize for translation and in 1997 he was knighted by the Dutch government for his services to literature. His second poetry collection, A Way of Getting Through, appeared in 1995 and his last, The Brightness In Between, was published shortly before his death in 2000. Some of the poets whose work he translated into English include Rutger Kopland, Anton Korteweg, M. Vasalis, Hans Lodeizen, Gerrit Achterberg, Remco Campert, Tom van Deel, J. C. Bloem and Patty Scholten. Kopland in particular was a poet with whose work he had had a special affinity with since the 1980s, and had enjoyed a close working collaboration with him.

== Legacy ==
After his death, the Foundation for the Production and Translation of Dutch Literature inaugurated a biennial award, The Brockway Prize, for the translation of Dutch poetry; the first award was made in 2005. The prize is awarded for a body of work and the target language changes on a rotating basis. English-language winners have been Francis R. Jones in 2005, Judith Wilkinson in 2013, and David Colmer in 2021. Additionally a Brockway Workshop has also been set up, to run every two years, offering more practical support to international poetry translators.

== Selected bibliography ==
- No Summer Song, London, Fortune Press, 1949 (poetry).
- The Prospect and the River, London, Jackson's Arm, 1987 (translations of Kopland).
- A World Beyond Myself, London, Enitharmon, 1991 (translations of Kopland).
- Under the Apple Tree, Leiden, 1994 (translations of Kopland).
- Anton Korteweg, Amsterdam, 1994 (translations of Korteweg).
- A Way of Getting Through, Ware, Rockingham Press, 1995 (poetry).
- Singers Behind Glass, Lincoln, Jackson's Arm, 1995 (translations of eight 20th-century Dutch poets).
- The Brightness In Between, Ware, Rockingham Press, 2000 (poetry).
