= Ivan V. Lalić =

Serbian and Yugoslav poet

Ivan V. Lalić (8 June 1931 – 28 July 1996) was a Serbian and Yugoslav poet. He was also a translator of poetry from English, French and German into his mother tongue.

== Biography ==
Lalić was born in Belgrade; his father, Vlajko, was a journalist, and his grandfather Isidor Bajić was a composer. His poems tell of a happy childhood, but also of two teenage traumas. As a child in Belgrade, many of his school-friends perished in a 1944 air-raid - as described in the poem "Zardjala igla (A rusty needle)". Lalić said that "my childhood and boyhood in the war marked everything I ever wrote as a poem or poetry". A second trauma was the loss of his mother, Ljubica Bajić, from tuberculosis in 1946.

Ivan V. Lalić finished high school in Zagreb, where he studied law. Here he met his wife Branka (née Kašnar), who was studying English and music. They married in 1956. Ivan described her as "the spirit behind my poems", and her presence remains in his verse at all stages of his poetic oeuvre.

Ivan V. Lalić published his first poems in 1952, and his first collection of poetry in 1955; the last appeared in 1996, the year of his death. After initially working as a literary editor for Radio Zagreb, he moved to Belgrade in 1961 to take up a new post: Secretary of the Yugoslav Writer's Union. Then, from 1979 until his retirement in 1993, he worked as an editor for the Nolit publishing house in Belgrade.

Ivan and Branka Lalić spent the summers with their family in the Istrian town of Rovinj. They had two sons. The elder, Vlajko, died in a sailing accident between Rovinj and Venice in 1989. Ivan V. Lalić died suddenly in Belgrade in 1996. He was survived by his wife Branka, who died in 2026, and by his younger son Marko.

== Poetics, thought and themes ==
Lalić’s use of vivid imagery and metaphor within a clear poetic structure has led Serbian critics to label him a ‘post-symbolist,’ following in the footsteps of W. B. Yeats, T. S. Eliot, Wallace Stevens, Paul Valéry, Rainer Maria Rilke, and Serbian predecessors like Vojislav Ilić and Milan Rakić. Drawing on the landscapes, histories, and myths of the Eastern Mediterranean and its Italian, Balkan, and Greek hinterlands, he may also be viewed as a Mediterranean poet, akin to C.P. Cavafy, Giorgos Seferis, and Eugenio Montale.

In her obituary of Lalić, Celia Hawkesworth spoke of "the central place in his work of memory: fragile in the face of the collapse of civilisations, but all we have. Memory allows the poet to recreate brief instants of personal joy as well as to conjure up a sense of the distant past. It allows each of us, as individuals condemned to solitude, to connect with a shared inheritance and feel, for a moment, part of a larger whole."

== Reputation and legacy ==
Lalić’s domestic reputation grew slowly. In the 1960s and 1970s, his work did not chime well with the avant-garde approach prevalent in Yugoslav poetry - nor with the emotive lyricism popular with broader audiences, as in the work of Branko Miljković, whom Lalić addresses in his poem "Prolećna liturgija za mrtvog pesnika" ('Spring liturgy for a dead poet'). But through the 1980s and 1990s he gradually became recognized as a major voice in his country's poetry. By 1997, Aleksandar Jovanović, editor of Lalić’s 1997 Dela ('Collected Works'), described his oeuvre as standing "not only at the peak of Serbian poetry in the second half of [the 20th] century, but at the peak of Serbian poetry in general”.

Abroad, however, Lalić's reputation grew more quickly. He was among seven non-Anglophone poets featured in the inaugural 1965 issue of the UK journal Modern Poetry in Translation, edited by Ted Hughes and Daniel Weissbort (see #Bibliography below). Hughes and Weissbort praised these poets for the way they tackled "universally comprehensible" issues and did "not fight shy of philosophy" – features which are central to Lalić’s work.

Lalić is now recognised internationally as one of Yugoslavia’s and Serbia’s most accomplished late 20th-century poets. Book-length translations of his poems have appeared in six languages (English, French, Italian, Polish, Hungarian and Macedonian). Individual poems have appeared in more than 20 languages. UK critics have described his poetry as "vital and intense", with a "magisterial transcendent quality", and his "lyrics [as] ablaze with successes of metaphor", with an "irresistible blend of private lyricism and public force".

Lalić also wrote a radio drama (Majstor Hanuš, 1965) and a body of literary criticism. He edited and translated book-length anthologies of modern French poetry, German poetry (with several co-translators) and American poetry (with Branka Lalić as co-translator).

== Awards ==
Lalić was awarded many literary prizes, including Yugoslavia's and Serbia's most prestigious awards:

- Nagrada tribine mladih (1960),
- Zmajeva nagrada (1961),
- Nagrada jugoslovenske radiodifuzije (1965),
- Nolitova nagrada (1969),
- Nagrada "Miloš Đurić" (1978),
- Nagrada "Branko Miljković" (1985),
- Gost Disovog proleća (1987),
- Oktobarska Nagrada Beograda (1988),
- Nagrada "Meša Selimović" (1992),
- Nagrada "Stanislav Vinaver" (1992),
- Nagrada lista Borba (1992),
- Velika Bazjaške povelja (Romania, 1994),
- Nagrada "Braća Micić" (1995)
- Nagrada "Vasko Popa" (1996),
- Žička hrisovulja (1996),
- Račanska povelja (1996),
- Vitalova Nagrada "Zlatni suncokret" (1996).

In English translation (see below), his poems have gained six awards:

- Thornton Wilder Prize (1990),
- European Poetry Translation Prize (1991),
- 2nd Prize, British Comparative Literature Association Translation Competition (1992),
- European Poetry Translation Prize (Joint Winner, 1997),
- 1st Prize, John Dryden Translation Competition (2013),
- 3rd Prize, Stephen Spender Prize for poetry in translation (2019).

== Bibliography ==
Ivan V. Lalić published eleven collections of poetry in his mother tongue.

- Bivši dečak (‘Once a Boy’, 1955)
- Vetrovito proleće (‘Windy Spring’, 1956)
- Velika Vrata Mora (‘The Great Gates of the Sea’, 1958)
- Melisa (‘Melissa’, 1959)
- Argonauti i druge pesme (‘The Argonauts and other poems’, 1961)
- Čin (‘Act’, 1963)
- Krug (‘Circle’, 1968)
- Smetnje na Vezama (‘Fading Contact’, 1975)
- Strasna Mera (‘The Passionate Measure’, 1984)
- Pismo (‘Script’, 1992)
- Četiri kanona (‘Four Canons’, 1996)

Lalić also produced two selections of his work:

- Vreme, vatre, vrtovi (‘Time, Fires, Gardens’, 1961). This includes the complete Melisa, plus poems selected from his other four early books, including Argonauti i druge pesme. In this volume, Lalić defined the early poems that he saw as part of his poetic legacy, and set aside what he saw as juvenilia: he regarded it not as “a book of selected poems, but […] his first real book”.
- Izabrane i nove pesme (‘Selected and New Poems’, 1969) – published in English translation as A Rusty Needle. The “selected” poems are largely from Vreme, vatre, vrtovi and his two subsequent books Čin and Krug. The “new” poems form the cycle O delima ljubavi, ili Vizantija (‘Of the Works of Love, or Byzantium’).

A compilation of all Ivan V. Lalić’s published work – Dela (‘Works’) – was in preparation at his death in 1996. Edited by Aleksandar Jovanović, it appeared in 1997. It contains three volumes of poetry and one of literary criticism.

Translations in English

Poems by Lalić, in his own translation, appeared in the 1965 first issue of Modern Poetry in Translation (ed. Ted Hughes and Daniel Weissbort) - an influential UK magazine which helped to establish 'new European poetry' as a driving force in UK poetic culture.

Two book-length selections of Ivan V. Lalić’s poetry have appeared in Charles Simic's translation:

- Fire Gardens (New York, NY: New Rivers, 1970)
- Roll Call of Mirrors (Middletown, CT: Wesleyan University Press, 1988)

Seven editions of Ivan V. Lalić’s poetry have appeared in Francis R. Jones's translation:

- The Works of Love: Selected Poems (London: Anvil Press, 1981)
- Last Quarter: Poems from The Passionate Measure (London: Anvil Press / Turret, 1985)
- The Passionate Measure (London: Anvil Press / Dublin: Dedalus: 1989)
- A Rusty Needle (London: Anvil Press, 1996)
- Fading Contact (London: Anvil Press, 1997)
- Walking Towards the Sea / Koraci prema moru (Belgrade: Univerzitetska biblioteka “Svetozar Marković”, 2014)
- The Taste of Lightning: Selected Poems (Hexham: Bloodaxe, 2025)

Book-length translations in other languages

- French: Temps, feux, jardins, tr. Alain Bosquet (Paris: Librairie Saint-German-des-Pres, 1973)
- Hungarian: A szerelem művei, tr. Kalman Dudás (Budapest: Europa K, 1971)
- Italian: Poesie, tr. Eros Sekvi (Milano: Jaca Book, 1991)
- Macedonian: Izabrani i nove pesmi, tr. Ante Popovski (Skopje: Makedonska kniga, 1981)
- Polish: O dziełach miłości albo Bizancijum, tr. Joanna Salamon (Kraków: Wydavnictwo literackije, 1971)
