= Europa in Trümmern =

1990 book edited by Hans Magnus Enzensberger

- Editor: Hans Magnus Enzensberger
- Language: German
- Publisher: Eichborn Verlag
- Publication date: 1990
- Publication place: Germany
- Pages: 301
- ISBN: 382184065X

Europa in Trümmern. Augenzeugenberichte aus den Jahren 1944 bis 1948 (lit. 'Europe in Rubbles. Eyewitness Accounts from the Years 1944 to 1948'), also published as Europa in Ruinen (lit. 'Europe in Ruins'), is a 1990 German anthology book edited by Hans Magnus Enzensberger.

== Summary ==
The book is a collection of texts describing the situation in European cities bombed during World War II, originally published from 1944 to 1948. Most of the texts are by journalists and authors who did not experience the bombing themselves, describing life in the ruins and the appearances of the destroyed cities from an outsider's perspective. The book features texts by Stig Dagerman, Alfred Döblin, Janet Flanner, Max Frisch, Martha Gellhorn, John Gunther, Norman Lewis, A. J. Liebling, Robert Thompson Pell and Edmund Wilson.
