= Air Raid (text) =

1977 book by Alexander Kluge

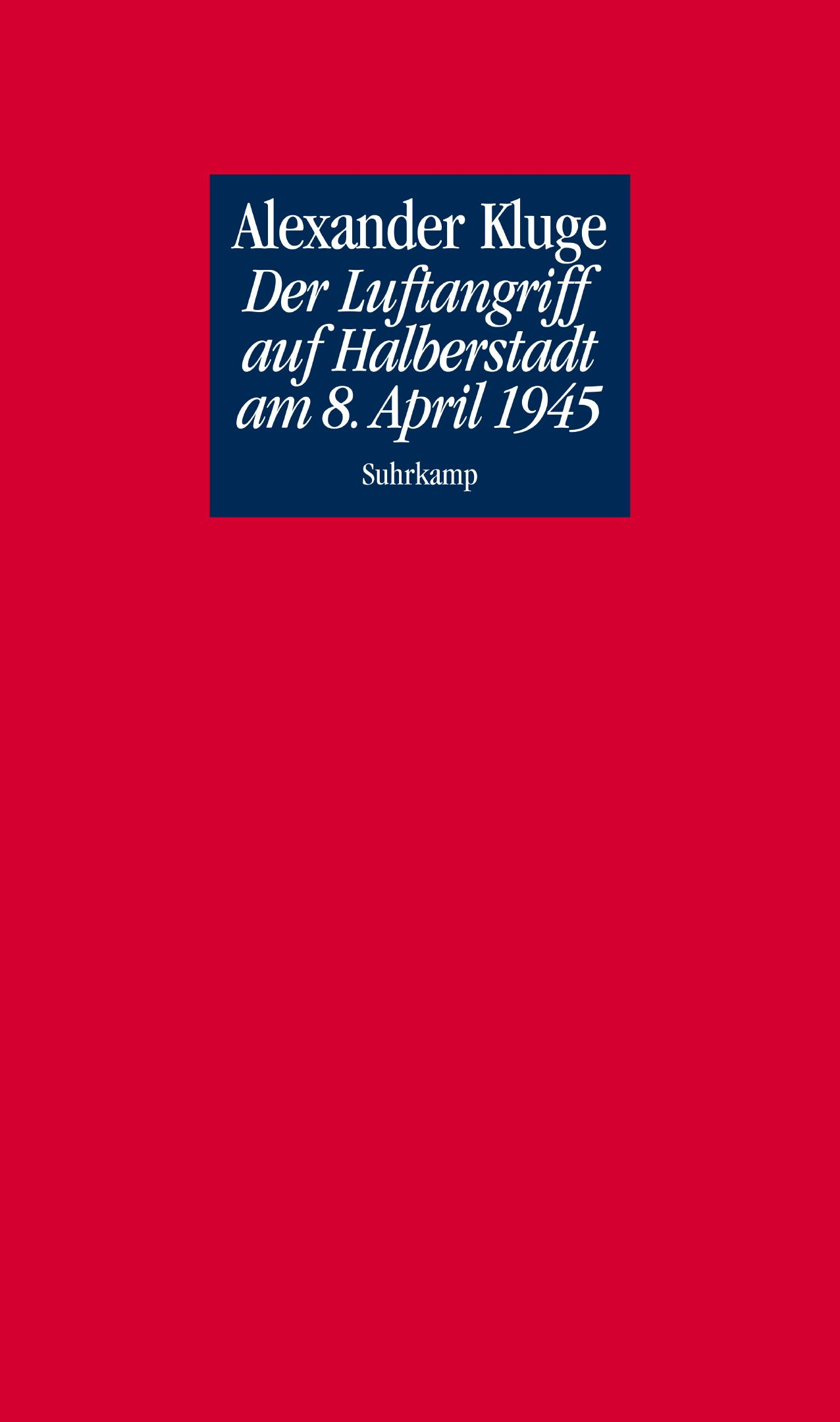
- Author: Alexander Kluge
- Original title: Der Luftangriff auf Halberstadt am 8. April 1945
- Translator: Martin Chalmers
- Language: German
- Publisher: Suhrkamp Verlag
- Publication date: 1977
- Publication place: West Germany
- English publication date: November 2014
- Pages: 74

Air Raid (German: Der Luftangriff auf Halberstadt am 8. April 1945, lit. 'The Airstrike on Halberstadt on 8 April 1945') is a text by the German writer Alexander Kluge about an episode from World War II. Published in 1977 in the book Neue Geschichten, it is a mixture of report and memoir that includes photographs, drawings and diagrams to give an account of the destruction of Kluge's hometown of Halberstadt, which he observed at the age of 13. The town had no military function or strategic importance, but due to unexpected clouds, a squadron of American bomb planes aborted its original mission and dropped the bombs on a civilian target.

The text has been compared to Hans Erich Nossack's The End: Hamburg 1943 (1943), which gives an account of the bombing of Hamburg. These texts address the destruction of German cities during World War II, which became a national trauma and a taboo subject in the post-war period.
