= Francis R. Jones =

English academic (born 1955)

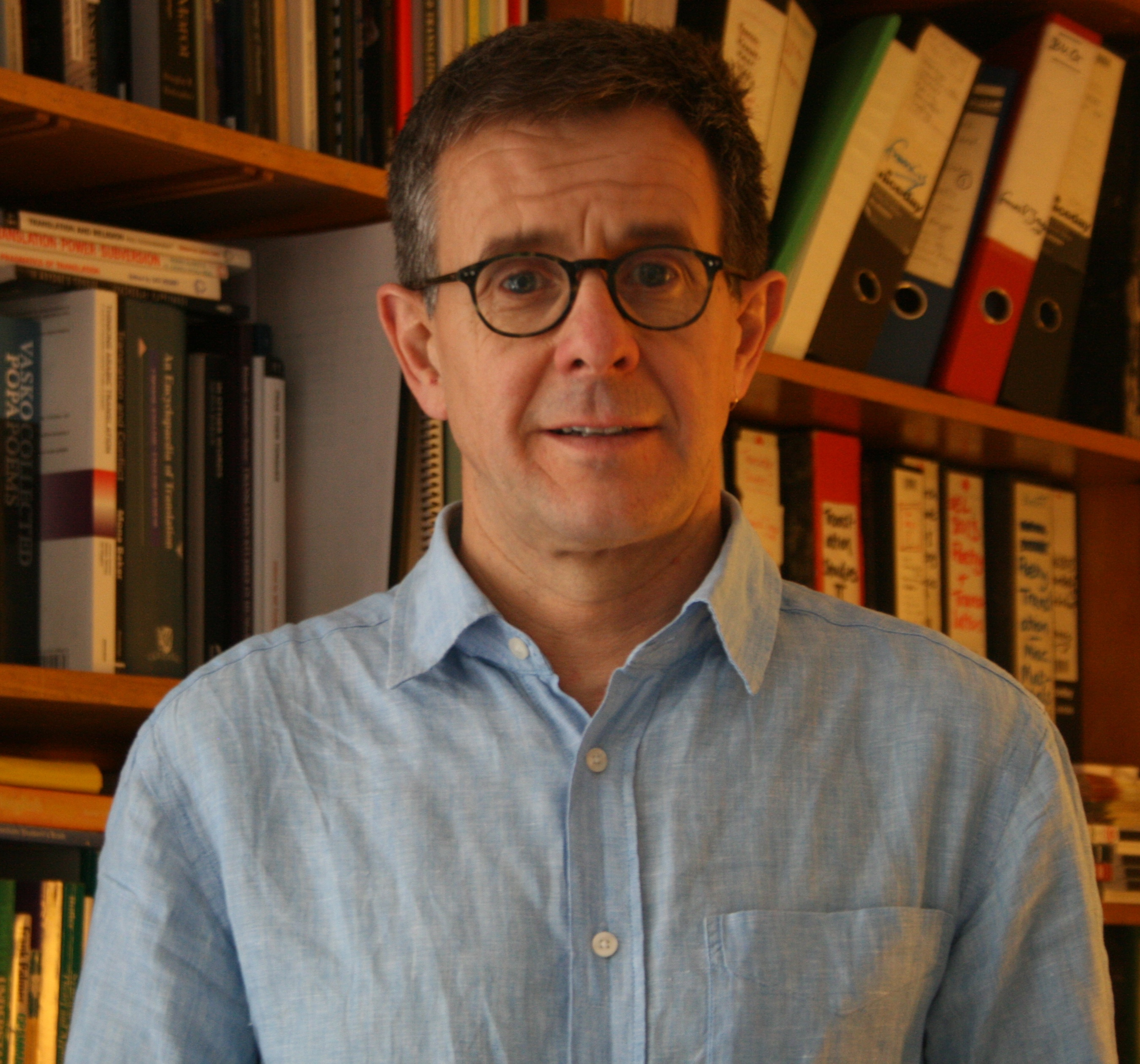
Francis R. Jones, 2013

Francis R. Jones (born 1955) is a poetry translator and Reader in Translation Studies at Newcastle University. He is currently Head of the Translating and Interpreting Section of the School of Modern Languages at Newcastle. He works largely from Dutch and Bosnian/Croatian/Serbian, though also from German, Hungarian, Russian, and Caribbean creoles.

== Background ==
He read German and Serbo-Croat at St John's College, Cambridge, and then spent a year researching poetry at the University of Sarajevo. After working as a Dutch-English in-house translator, he combined freelance translating with teaching English in the Netherlands and Greece. He joined Exeter University in 1988 and Newcastle University in 1990, working initially on foreign-language learning. However, his research and teaching work now focuses on translation studies. His numerous translations include works by Ivan V. Lalić, Vasko Popa and the Dutch poet Hans Faverey. He has twice been awarded the Poetry Society’s European Poetry Translation Prize for his translations of books by Ivan V. Lalić. Both his poetry translations and prose editing (e.g. of works by Rusmir Mahmutćehajić) as well as his academic writing show a strong commitment for a non-ethicized view of South Slav culture, and aim to foster parallels and dialogue within the South Slav/post-Yugoslav cultural space.

== Qualifications ==
- PhD, Newcastle University, 1996
- MA, Applied Linguistics, Reading University, 1988.
- BA, Modern and Medieval Languages, St John's College, Cambridge University, 1977

== Research ==
=== Research interests ===
Francis Jones' research is largely inspired by his work as a poetry translator from Dutch and Bosnian/Croatian/Serbian. It mainly falls into two overlapping areas:

- Poetry translation - especially how poetry translators translate, how they work with others, creativity and style, and the social/ethical role of the poetry translator.
- South Slav (ex-Yugoslav) area studies, especially in the fields of modern poetry, culture and identity, with a specific interest in Bosnia and Serbia.

=== Other expertise ===
Foreign/second language learning, especially in the field of self-instruction. This was the topic of his PhD thesis (Going it Alone: Self-Instruction in Adult Foreign Language Learning, Newcastle University, 1996). Though he is no longer actively researching in this area, it still interests him.

=== Current work ===
He is now working on how ideology is expressed in published poetry translations - via the context of translation, and/or via the translator's decisions while actually translating. He is also interested in exploring poets' processes when they translate other poets.

=== Recognition ===
To date, Francis Jones has given over 30 conference plenary papers, guest lectures, seminars and workshops on literary translation, and over 25 readings of his own poetry translations.

- Honorary Board Member, International Forum Bosnia (academic network)
- Steering Committee Member, Mak Dizdar Foundation, Bosnia
- Panel member, Bosnian Book of the Year (2000-2005)
- Assessor for the Translators’ List, Foundation for Production and Translation of Dutch Literature
- Jury member, Corneliu Popescu Prize for the Translation of European Poetry (2007)
- Committee Member, Translators' Association(2005-2007)
- Jury member, Vondel Prize for the Translation of Dutch Literature (1996-2003)
- Studio 99, Sarajevo: TV programme 'Engagement and aesthetics: dilemmas of the literary translator': presenter of introductory lecture and panel discussant (2001)
- Studio 99, Sarajevo: TV programme devoted to his translation of Mak Dizdar’s Stone Sleeper (1999)
- Chair, biennial Nobel Seminar, Swedish Academy, Stockholm, 1998 (theme: translating of poetry and poetic prose)

== Book-length poetry translations ==
- Dizdar, Mak (1999) Kameni spavač / Stone Sleeper. From Bosnian, ed. Rusmir Mahmutćehajić, graphics Dževad Hozo. Sarajevo: Kuća bosanska.
- Dizdar, Mak (2009) Stone Sleeper. Revised edn. From Bosnian, ed. Rusmir Mahmutćehajić. London: Anvil.
- Faverey, Hans (1994) Against the Forgetting. From Dutch. London: Anvil.
- Faverey, Hans (2004) Against the Forgetting. Revised and expanded edn. New York: New Directions.
- Faverey, Hans (2011) Chrysanthemums, Rowers. From Dutch, co-tr. Lela Faverey. Providence, Rhode Island: Leon Works.
- Jansma, Esther (2008) What It Is: Selected Poems. From Dutch. Tarset: Bloodaxe.
- Kulenović, Skender (2007) Soneti / Sonnets. From Serbo-Croat, ed. Rusmir Mahmutćehajić, graphics Mersad Berber. Special Gala Edition of Forum Bosnae, 41/07.
- Kupriyanov, Vyacheslav (1992) In Anyone's Tongue. From Russian. London: Forest.
- Lalić, Ivan V. (1981) The Works of Love. From Serbo-Croat. London: Anvil.
- Lalić, Ivan V. (1985) Last Quarter: Poems from The Passionate Measure. From Serbo-Croat. London: Anvil / Turret.
- Lalić, Ivan V. (1989) The Passionate Measure. From Serbo-Croat. London / Dublin: Anvil / Dedalus.
- Lalić, Ivan V. (1996) A Rusty Needle. From Serbo-Croat. London: Anvil.
- Lalić, Ivan V. (1997) Fading Contact. From Serbo-Croat. London: Anvil.
- Lindner, Erik (2021) Words are the Worst. From Dutch. Montréal: Signal Editions, Vehicule Press.
- Popa, Vasko (2011) Complete Poems. From Serbo-Croat, ed. Francis R. Jones, co-tr. Anne Pennington, introduction Ted Hughes. London: Anvil.
- Radnóti Miklós (2000) Camp Notebook. From Hungarian. Todmorden: Arc.
- Skenderija, Saša (2008) Why The Dwarf Had To Be Shot. From Bosnian, co-tr. Wayles Browne and Aaron Tate. Austin, TX: Black Buzzard.
- Van Bastelaere, Dirk (2005) The Last To Leave: Selected Poems. From Dutch, co-tr. Willem Groenewegen and John Irons. Exeter: Shearsman.

== Awards and honours ==
- 2013: First Prize, John Dryden Translation Competition
- 2010: Winner, David Reid Poetry Translation Prize
- 2008: Runner-up, Vondel Prize for Translation of Dutch literature
- 2008: Runner-up, David Reid Poetry Translation Prize
- 2008: Publication of the Year Shield, XX Sarajevo International Book Fair, for Skender Kulenović, Soneti / Sonnets (2007).
- 2007: Winner, David Reid Poetry Translation Prize
- 2005: Inaugural Winner, James Brockway Prize for the Translation of Dutch Poetry
- 2000: Best Translation, Association of Publishers and Booksellers in Bosnia and Herzegovina (for Mak Dizdar's Stone Sleeper).
- 1999: Winner, Sarajevo April 6 Prize (for Mak Dizdar's Stone Sleeper).
- 1997: Joint Winner, European Poetry Translation Prize (for Ivan V. Lalić's A Rusty Needle)
- 1996/7: Commendation, British Comparative Literature Association Translation Competition (for poems by Mak Dizdar)
- 1994/5: Second Prize, British Comparative Literature Association Translation Competition (for poems by Ivan V. Lalić and Drago Štambuk)
- 1991: Winner, European Poetry Translation Prize (for Ivan V. Lalić's The Passionate Measure).
- 1988: Honorable Mention, James S. Holmes Translation Awards, Columbia University (for Hans Faverey's Against the Forgetting).

== Selected academic publications ==
- Jones FR. Poetry Translating as Expert Action: Processes, Priorities and Networks. Amsterdam; Philadelphia: John Benjamins, 2011.
- Jones FR. Passing on the Hasanaginica: translator's afterword. Forum Bosnae 2010, 51, 278-288.
- Jones FR. Poetry translation, nationalism and the wars of the Yugoslav transition. The Translator 2010, 16(2), 223-253.
- Jones FR. (trans). The sad ballad of the noble lady Hasan Aginica. Forum Bosnae 2010, 51, 270-275.
- Jones FR. Review of Shakespeare and the language of translation. Modern Language Review 2006, 101(3), 821-822.
- Jones FR. Stroking hands over the heart: ten translators and the verse of Gerrit Kouwenaar. Modern Poetry in Translation 2006, 3(6), 158-167.
- Jones FR. Ethics, aesthetics and décision: Literary translating in the wars of the Yugoslav succession. Meta 2004, 49(4), 711-728.
- Jones FR. Etika, estetika i décision: književno prevođenje u ratovima za jugoslovensko nasljedstvo (Ethics, aesthetics and décision: literary translation in the wars of the Yugolslav succession). Sarajevske sveske 2003, 3, 101-123.
- Jones FR. Self-instructed foreign language learning: an annotated bibliography. Newcastle upon Tyne, UK: University of Newcastle upon Tyne, 2003.
- Jones FR. Seeking the sleepers. Stolac, 2001.
- Jones FR. The poet and the ambassador: communicating Mak Dizdar's Stone Sleeper. Translation and Literature 2000, 9(1), 65-87.
- Jones FR. Review of The Iron-Blue Vault: Selected Poems, by Attila József, and Eternal Monday: New and Selected Poems, by György Petri. In Other Words 1999, 17.
- Jones FR. A leak in the silence: The poetry of Hans Faverey. Callaloo 1998, 21(3), 458-465.
- Jones FR. Gender and second-language self-instruction. Lancaster, UK: Lancaster University, 1998. Centre for Research in Language Education Special Report.
- Jones FR. Povratak (Return). Forum Bosnae 1998, 1-2, 195-207.
- Jones FR. Ivan V. Lalic: a fusion of cultures. The Guardian 1996, (2 August), 14.
- Jones FR. Prevoditeljevo slovo (Translator's word). Oslobodjenje 1996, (25 March).
- Jones FR. Teach yourself languages: the lone language learner. Independence 1996, 18, 16-19.
- Jones FR. Learner, teach thyself! Self-directed language learning. Greta 1995, 3(2), 19-23.
- Jones FR. Learning an alien lexicon: a single-subject case study. Second Language Research 1995, 11(2), 95-111.
- Jones FR. A visszatérés (Return). Ex Symposion 1994, 8-9, 66-72.
- Jones FR. Poems by Ivan V. Lalić and Drago Štambuk. Contemporary Criticism 1994, (16), 105-125.
- Jones FR. Beyond the fringe: a framework for assessing teach-yourself materials for ab initio English-speaking learners. System 1993, 21(4), 453-469.
- Jones FR. The stargazer's legacy: Vasko Popa. North Dakota Quarterly 1993, 61, 83-88.
- Jones FR. A language-teaching machine: input, uptake and output in the communicative classroom. System 1992, 20(2), 133-150.
- Jones FR. Classroom riot: design features, language output and topic in simulations and other communicative free-stage activities. System 1991, 19(3), 151-169.
- Jones FR. Mickey-mouse and state-of-the-art: program sophistication and classroom methodology in communicative CALL. System 1991, 19(1-2), 1-13.
- Jones FR. On aboriginal sufferance: a process model of poetic translating. Target 1989, 1(2), 183-199.
- Jones FR. The rose whose scent is time: the poetry of Ivan V. Lalić. Tracks 1982, 2, 31-34.

== Translation samples ==
Francis Jones reads Cathedrals by Ivan V. Lalić on YouTube
