= Skender Kulenović =

Bosnian writer (1910–1978)

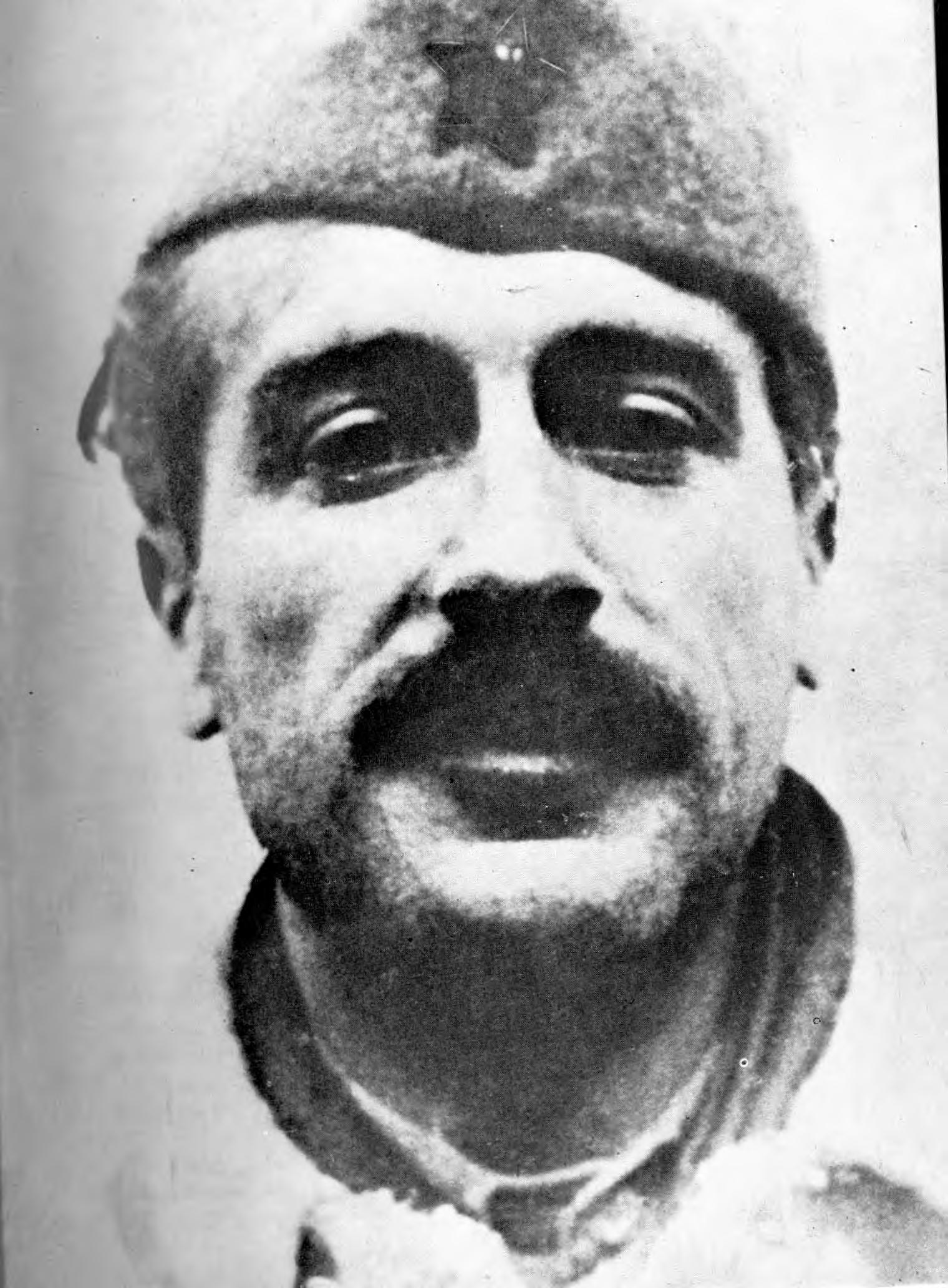
- Kulenović in 1943
- Born: 2 September 1910; Bosanski Petrovac, Bosnia and Herzegovina, Austria-Hungary
- Died: 25 January 1978 (aged 67); Belgrade, SR Serbia, SFR Yugoslavia
- Occupation: Writer
- Writing career
- Genres: Poetry; Novel; Drama

Skender Kulenović (2 September 1910 – 25 January 1978) was a Bosnian writer.

== Biography ==
Skender Kulenović was born in 1910 in the Bosnian town of Bosanski Petrovac (then part of the Austro-Hungarian Empire), to Bosnian Muslim parents. Kulenović hailed from the landowning Bey family, one of the richest and oldest in Bosnia. However, in 1921, his family became impoverished due to the agrarian reforms brought in by the new Kingdom of Yugoslavia and they moved to the central Bosnian town of Travnik, his mother's birthplace. In Travnik, Kulenović completed his high school education at the local Jesuit gymnasium. There he wrote his first poems, culminating in the publication of a set of sonnets (Ocvale primule) in 1927. He then went to Zagreb to study law. In Zagreb, he became inspired by leftist ideas, joining the League of Communist Youth of Yugoslavia (SKOJ) in 1933 and the Yugoslav Communist Party (KPJ) in 1935. He would give up his law studies and begin to focus on writing. In 1937, he co-founded the left-wing journal Putokaz (Signpost) with Hasan Kikić and Safet Krupić, which became a forum for discussing various socio-economic issues.

In late 1939 or early 1940, Skender Kulenović was expelled from the KPJ for having refused to sign an open letter criticising the government and advocating autonomy for Bosnia and Herzegovina – a decision which prevented him from publishing in many of the journals he had worked with until then. In 1940 he married his first wife, Ana Prokop.

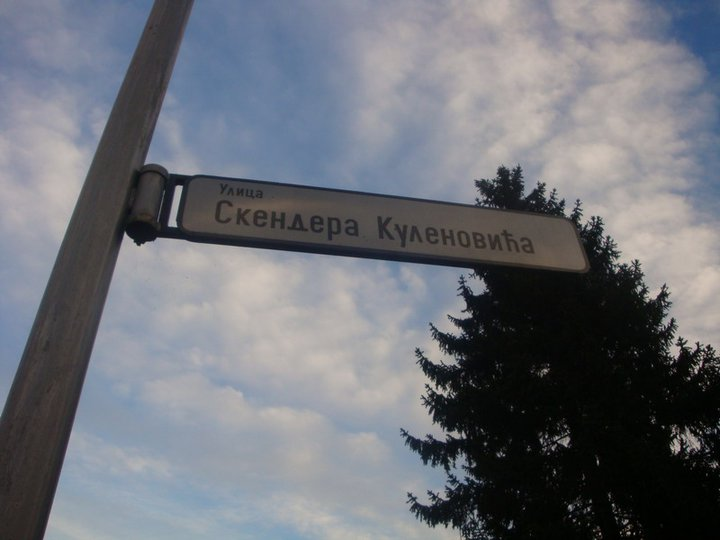
One of the streets in Banja Luka carries his name.

In 1941, at the outbreak of World War II after Yugoslavia was invaded, Kulenović was still in Zagreb. He joined Josip Broz Tito’s Yugoslav Partisans and was transferred to the Bosnian Krajina region where he served as a member of the First Partisan Detachment. He engaged in literary work, edited the newspapers Krajiški partizan, Bosanski udarnik, Glas and Oslobođenje, and gave speeches promoting the struggle for liberation and advocating for brotherhood and unity between Muslims and Serbs. His best works were arguably written during this time, including three of his most popular poems: Stojanka majka Knežopoljka (1942), Pisma Jove Stanivuka (1942) and Ševa (1943). The folk-epic Stojanka majka Knežopoljka references the Kozara Offensive and subsequent persecution of the Serbian population, describing the pain of a mother who lost her three sons. According to the writer Jasmin Agić, Pisma Jove Stanivuka and Ševa represented the foundation of the "revolutionary heroism" theme that would become present in Kulenović's writings.

In 1945, Skender Kulenović was appointed Drama Director of the National Theatre in newly liberated Sarajevo. He married his second wife, Vera Crvenčanin, a film director. The postwar years he devoted largely to drama and journalism: he wrote several successful theatre plays, but also a number of short stories, essays and poems, and edited various literary and non-literary journals. He edited Novo doba, Pregled, Književne novine and Nova misao. His comedies Djelidba (The Division) and Večera (The Dinner) touched on ethnic and societal divisions, which was a taboo in the tightly controlled Yugoslav communist government at the time. His refusal to abide by the rules led Kulenović to fall out of favor with authorities and move to the city of Mostar.

In 1959 he published “Stećak”, the first of his forty Sonnets. He also traveled to Egypt, which inspired a series of travelogues – and, later, the sonnet Vaze (Vases). 1968 saw the publication of the first twenty Soneti (Sonnets). Soneti II, the second set of twenty sonnets, followed in 1974. In 1977 his novel Ponornica (Lost River) appeared.

According to his wife, from after WWII until his death, he considered himself to be a Serb.

He died in Belgrade in January 1978 of heart failure.

== Legacy ==
Kulenović's life story is in many ways typical of a Bosnian-born intellectual of the Yugoslav age: born into a Bosnian Muslim family, educated in the Catholic tradition and living in the Serbian capital. Just as his political ethos was one of pan-Yugoslav unity in Tito's communism, so his cultural roots were embedded in the Ottoman, Croatian and Serbian traditions equally. Some Bosniaks and Serbs categorise him as a Bosniak poet and a Serbian poet respectively – a tendency which, the Sarajevo critic Ivan Lovrenović claims, "diminishes and degrades" the status of Kulenović and writers like him.

The historian Pål Kolstø cites Kulenović and Meša Selimović as among the prominent Bosnian writers with a "stubborn Yugoslav or mixed Yugoslav-ethnic identity" which makes it difficult to incorporate or define their works along any one particular line. His literary work is a part of common heritage of Serbs, Croats, Montenegrins and Bosniaks.

== Bibliography ==
- Stojanka majka Knežopoljka (1942)
- Pisma Jove Stanivuka (1942)
- Ševa (1943)
- Djelidba, Večera, A šta sad ? (1947)
- Soneti I (1968)
- Divanhana (1972)
- Soneti II (1974)
- Gromovo đule (1975)
- Ponornica (1977)

=== In English ===
- Kulenović, Skender (2003) Skender Kulenović. Translated by Francis R. Jones. Modern Poetry in Translation New Series/22: 61–69.
- Kulenović, Skender (2007) Soneti / Sonnets. Special Gala Edition of Forum Bosnae, 41/07. Bilingual edition, with English translations by Francis R. Jones, artwork by Mersad Berber, and afterwords by Francis R. Jones and Rusmir Mahmutćehajić.

== See also ==
- List of Bosnians
