= Lighter than Air: Moral Poems =

1999 poetry collection by Hans Magnus Enzensberger

Lighter than Air
- Author: Hans Magnus Enzensberger
- Original title: Leichter als Luft
- Translator: Reinhold Grimm
- Language: German
- Publisher: Suhrkamp Verlag
- Publication date: 1999
- Publication place: Germany
- English publication date: 2000
- Pages: 136
- ISBN: 351841058X

Lighter than Air: Moral Poems (German: Leichter als Luft. Moralische Gedichte) is a 1999 poetry collection by the German writer Hans Magnus Enzensberger. The poems express Enzensberger's interests in mathematics, language, travelling and riddles, and his distancing from the utopian themes of his early works.

The book was published in an English interpretation by Reinhold Grimm in 2000 and one by David Constantine in 2002. Publishers Weekly wrote that it consists of little songs or ditties where the "tone is based on a straightforward, caustic wit, one embodied by ubiquitous, simple declaratives and unreliable-narrator posturings that don't need much care from the translator". Constantine's translation received the 2003 Popescu Prize.
