= The Sinking of the Titanic (poem) =

1978 epic poem by Hans Magnus Enzensberger

- Title page for Der Untergang der Titanic (1978)
- Author: Hans Magnus Enzensberger
- Original title: Der Untergang der Titanic
- Language: German
- Publisher: Suhrkamp Verlag
- Publication date: 1978
- Publication place: West Germany
- English publication date: 1980
- Pages: 114
- ISBN: 351802762X

The Sinking of the Titanic (German: Der Untergang der Titanic) is an epic and allegorical poem by the German poet Hans Magnus Enzensberger, first published by Suhrkamp Verlag in 1978.

The poem is primarily about the failure of Western civilization as an enterprise, a point which Enzensberger makes explicitly in the passage about Icelanders, who, when their properties are threatened by volcanic lava flows, endeavour to stem the inexorable tide with hoses:

pointing more and more hoses at the advancing fiery lava
[..] and thus postponing,
not forever perhaps, but for the time being at least,
the Decline of Western Civilisation

Similarities and parallels have been frequently drawn between this poem and T. S. Eliot's 1922 poem The Waste Land, not only in terms of the subject matter but also in the way in which shifts in mood, perspective, time and voice conspire to move the reader to a single overwhelming point. The poem was adapted into an opera by Wilhelm Dieter Siebert.
