= Irene Dische =

American-Austrian writer (born 1952)

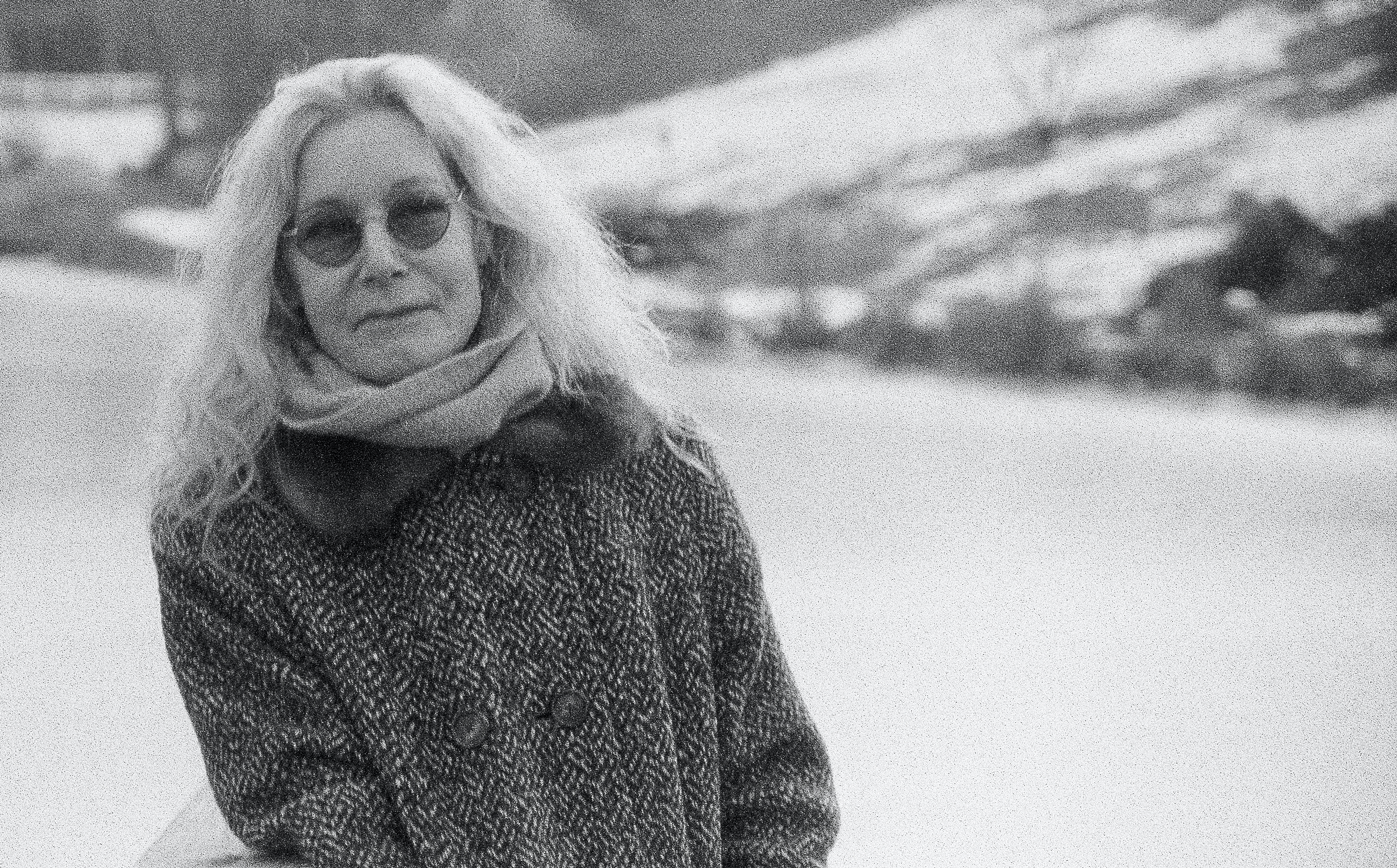
- Born: February 13, 1952; New York City, U.S.
- Education: Harvard University
- Occupation: Novelist

Irene Dische (born February 13, 1952) is an American-Austrian author, journalist, screenwriter, and librettist whose work explores the German-Jewish experience, alienation, and exile.

== Early life and education ==
Daughter of Jewish refugees, Ukrainian-American scientist Zacharias Dische and one time deputy Medical Examiner of NYC, Dr. Maria Renate Dische (née Rother), Dische was born and raised speaking German in the Washington Heights district of New York City. She learned English in kindergarten, commuting two hours a day by subway and bus to attend the Brearley School in Manhattan, but eventually dropped out and never finished high school. She worked in East Africa for the paleontologist Louis Leakey, who, she said, "had a great respect for high-school dropouts." She returned to the United States in 1972, and enrolled at Harvard University, majoring in anthropology, but switching to History and Literature after Louis Leakey died. After graduation, Dische, who had dreamt of studying medicine but flunked her first semester of pre-med courses, studied with Robert Fitzgerald, who urged her to become a writer. Since she saw no reasonable alternative, she began working as a freelance writer, publishing in The New Yorker and The Nation.

== Career ==
=== Berlin: films, short stories, and novels ===
In her mid-twenties, Dische went to Germany as an interpreter for reporter Jane Kramer. She stayed, raising a family in Berlin, and writing long reportages for the German version of the New Yorker, "Transatlantik". Her journalism increasingly became fictional, as fact-checking was not yet in vogue. Soon she wrote only fiction. In 1986, she directed a film Zacharias, based on her father, a brilliant scientist who was, at 92, suffering from Alzheimers and living completely alone in a shabby neighborhood of NYC. He greatly missed his mother, who was killed by the Nazis, but he couldn't remember that, and in the film, his mother speaks to him; they converse. The film won prizes in the Berlinale, and several festivals and many still consider it Dische's greatest achievement. Dische published her first book, Pious Secrets,in 1989. This achieved considerable acclaim both in Germany and throughout Europe, where it was translated into fifteen languages. Since then, she has published 13 books of fiction, and volumes of short stories. "The Job", a thriller, was made into a TV film, starring Vanessa Redgrave. It was published by Bloomsbury in the UK, but never in the US. Dische wrote two children's books, the first one, Esterhazy, was illustrated by Michael Sowa. The second one, a book for young adults, "Between Two Seasons of Happiness", won several major literary awards in Europe, and was published in 20 countries including the UK (Bloomsbury) but was also never published in the US. In 1995, with Hans Magnus Enzensberger, she wrote the libretto for Aulis Sallinen's fifth opera The Palace. Dische collaborated with Hans Magnus Enzensberger on several more librettos, including Mozart's "Zaide" for the Berliner Staatsoper, "Politburo" for Wolfgang Rihm, and a series of ten minute librettos for various composers. She also wrote a new libretto for a Schubert opera,"The German Professor", based on the true story of a high ranking Nazi scholar who assumed a new identity as a left wing liberal in 1968. This was translated by Elfriede Jelinek and performed in German, premiering at the Heidelberg Opera. Dische collaborated with Tobias Picker on the orchestral work Opera Without Words in 2016. Her latest novel is a voice from the 18th century, belonging to the first celebrated transgender hero, a famous swordsman and intellectual, both as a man, and as a woman. He/she has some advice for those concerned with gender in the 21st century. As with all Dische's work, this will first be published in Germany, in autumn of 2021.

== Work ==
=== Novels ===
- Sad Strains of a Gay Waltz, German title Ein fremdes Gefühl, Bloomsbury (London, England), 1994, Metropolitan Books (New York, NY), 1997.
- Ein Job, Hoffmann & Campe (Hamburg, Germany), 2000, published as The Job, Bloomsbury (London, England), 2002.
- The Empress of Weehawken, Farrar, Straus and Giroux (New York, NY), 2007.

=== Documentaries ===
- Zacharias, 1986.

=== Short story collections ===
- Pious Secrets, German title: Fromme Lügen, Viking (New York, NY), 1991.
- The Jewess: Stories from Berlin and New York, Bloomsbury (London, England), 1992.
- Strange Traffic: Stories, Metropolitan Books (New York, NY), 1995.
- Loves/Lieben, dtv Verlagsgesellschaft (Munich, Germany), 2008.

=== Librettos ===
- The Palace with Hans Magnus Enzensberger, Aulis Sallinen, 1995.
- Opera Without Words, Tobias Picker, 2016.

=== Children's books ===
- Esterhazy, the Rabbit Prince, Creative Editions (Mankato, MN), 1994.

=== Young adult fiction ===
- Between Two Seasons of Happiness, Bloomsbury (London, England), 1998.

== Personal life ==
Dische divides her time between Berlin and Rhinebeck, New York. She is married to German lawyer Nicolas Becker and has two children: editor, writer, and translator Leon Dische-Becker, and writer and filmmaker Emily Dische-Becker.
