= Hasan Kikić =

Bosnian literate and poet

Hasan Kikić Хасан Кикић
- Born: 20 August 1905; Gradačac, Bosnia Eyalet, Ottoman Empire
- Died: 6 May 1942 (aged 36); Mt. Čemernica, Bosnia and Herzegovina, Yugoslavia
- Education: University of Belgrade (1937)
- Spouse: Anka Jovanović (1932–42; his death)
- Children: Zlatko (son; 1937–2020)
- Writing career
- Language: Serbo-Croatian

Hasan Kikić (Serbo-Croatian Cyrillic: Хасан Кикић; 20 August 1905 – 6 May 1942) was a Bosnian literate and poet.

Kikić co-founded the journal Putokaz (Signpost) with Skender Kulenović and Safet Krupić, in the wake of the cultural and political emancipation of the Bosnian Muslims. The journal was published from 1937 until 1939.

At the beginning of the Second World War, he joined the Partisans in February 1942 and, as a commissar of the battalion, died three months later – on May 6, 1942, in Chetnik ambush.

== Personal life ==
Kikić was born into an impoverished Bosnian Muslim bey family, one of seven sons of Haso Kikić and Munira (née Đulbegović). His father fought in World War I for the Austro-Hungarian Empire by the Italian river Piave.

While working in Rogatica from 1928–32, Kikić met teacher Anka Jovanović, who would become his wife. Anka, a Christian, was from a respectable bourgeois Serb family from Rogatica. The love between Muslims and Christians at the time was considered scandalous. Their families were not supportive of the marriage. Hasan and Anka shunned both families and relocated to the Croatian village Sjeničak in Kordun near Gvozd. They also stayed in Velika Kladuša for a short while.

After two years of teaching Kikić become the school governor, and in 1936 was transferred to Pisarovina, where the couple remained for four years.

== World War II ==
As a captain of the Yugoslav Partisans, Kikić was sent to Sanski Most. His wife Anka stayed in Zagreb with their son Zlatko. Kikić's friend Skender Kulenović had settled in Skender Vakuf during the war. Kulenović recalled that Kikić would often visit him from his post on Mount Čemernica. In May 1942, Kikić arrived on horseback for a short visit and was killed while traveling back to Čemernica.

Kikić and a traveling companion, a deaf-mute teenage messenger, were on horseback near the village Rapta on Mt. Čemernica when three Chetnik peasants with rifles emerged from the forest. The boy saw Kikić fall off his horse, but heard no gunshot. When the boy saw the men running in their direction and one waving his rifle, it became clear that Kikić had been shot. He hurried down the road, into the forest, where he witnessed Kikić crawling on the road, writhing in pain. Kikić, when he saw them running towards him, pulled out his revolver and committed suicide so he wouldn't be captured. The Chetniks fired several more rounds into his lifeless body. They looted him and when they realized that he was a Bosnian Muslim, they started beating his body.

== Works ==
- Provincija u pozadini (1935)
- Ho-ruk (1936)
- Šta se događa u Španiji (1937)
- Bukve (1938)
