= The Number Devil =

1997 book about mathematics for children and young adults

- The Number Devil: A Mathematical Adventure cover
- Author: Hans Magnus Enzensberger
- Translator: Michael Henry Heim
- Illustrator: Rotraut Susanne Berner
- Cover artist: Rotraut Susanne Berner
- Language: German
- Genre: Children's book
- Publisher: Henry Holt and Company
- Publication date: 1997
- Publication place: Germany
- English publication date: 1998
- Media type: Paperback/Hardcover
- Pages: 261
- ISBN: 0-8050-6299-8

The Number Devil: A Mathematical Adventure (German: Der Zahlenteufel. Ein Kopfkissenbuch für alle, die Angst vor der Mathematik haben) is a book for children and young adults that explores mathematics. It was originally written in 1997 in German by Hans Magnus Enzensberger and illustrated by Rotraut Susanne Berner. The book follows a young boy named Robert, who is taught mathematics by a sly "number devil" called Teplotaxl over the course of twelve dreams.

The book was met with mostly positive reviews from critics, approving its description of math while praising its simplicity. Its colorful use of fictional mathematical terms and its creative descriptions of concepts have made it a suggested book for both children and adults troubled with math. The Number Devil was a bestseller in Europe, and has been translated into English by Michael Henry Heim.

== Plot ==
Robert is a young boy who suffers from mathematical anxiety due to his boredom in school. His mother is Mrs. Wilson. He also experiences recurring dreams—including falling down an endless slide or being eaten by a giant fish—but is interrupted from this sleep habit one night by a small devil creature who introduces himself as the Number Devil. Although there are many Number Devils (from Number Heaven), Robert only knows him as the Number Devil before learning of his actual name, Teplotaxl, later in the story.

Over the course of twelve dreams, the Number Devil teaches Robert mathematical principles. On the first night, the Number Devil appears to Robert in an oversized world and introduces the number one. The next night, the Number Devil emerges in a forest of trees shaped like "ones" and explains the necessity of the number zero, negative numbers, and introduces hopping, a fictional term to describe exponentiation. On the third night, the Number Devil brings Robert to a cave and reveals how prima-donna numbers (prime numbers) can only be divided by themselves and one without a remainder. Later, on the fourth night, the Number Devil teaches Robert about rutabagas, another fictional term to depict square roots, at a beach.

An illustration by Rotraut Susanne Berner depicts the Number Devil showing a mathematical proof to Robert.

For a time after the fourth night, Robert cannot find the Number Devil in his dreams; later, however, on the fifth night, Robert finds himself at a desert where the Number Devil teaches him about triangular numbers through the use of coconuts. On the sixth night, the Number Devil teaches Robert about the natural occurrence of Fibonacci numbers, which the Number Devil shortens to Bonacci numbers, by counting brown and white rabbits as they reproduce multiple times. By this dream, Robert's mother has noticed a visible change in Robert's mathematical interest, and Robert begins going to sleep earlier to encounter the Number Devil. The seventh night brings Robert to a bare, white room, where the Number Devil presents Pascal's triangle and the patterns that the triangular array displays. On the eighth night, Robert is brought to his classroom at school. The Number Devil arranges Robert's classmates in multiple ways, teaches him about permutations, and what the Number Devil calls vroom numbers (factorials).

On the ninth night, Robert dreams he is in bed, suffering from the flu, when the Number Devil appears next to him. The Number Devil teaches Robert about natural numbers, which the Number Devil calls garden-variety numbers, the unusual characteristics of infinite, and infinite series. Robert finds himself at the North Pole, where the Number Devil introduces irrational numbers (unreasonable numbers), as well as aspects of Euclidean geometry, such as vertices (dots) and edges (lines). By the eleventh night, Robert has shown considerable increased interest in mathematics, but questions its validity, to which the Number Devil introduces the concept of mathematical proofs, ending with the Number Devil showing Robert a complicated proof of basic arithmetic. On the twelfth night, Robert and the Number Devil receive an invitation (which names the Number Devil as Teplotaxl) to Number Heaven, as Robert's time with the Number Devil has finished. At Number Heaven, Robert learns of imaginary numbers, which Teplotaxl describes as imaginative numbers, as well as the Klein bottle. Walking through Number Heaven, Teplotaxl introduces Robert to various famous mathematicians, such as Fibonacci, whom Teplotaxl calls Bonacci, and George Cantor, or Professor Singer. The book ends with Robert in class using his newfound mathematical knowledge.

== History ==
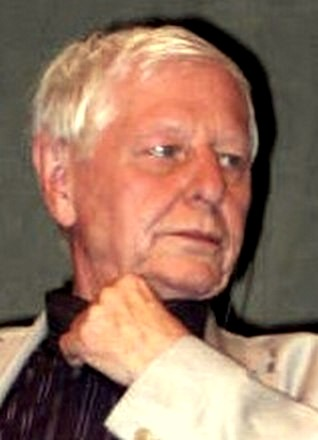
Hans Magnus Enzensberger

Enzensberger fostered a passion for mathematics and numbers, although he was not a mathematician by trade. In 1998, he delivered a speech at the International Congress of Mathematicians criticizing the isolation of mathematics from popular culture. The Number Devil was ultimately written on suggestion from Enzensberger's eleven-year-old daughter Theresia. Because he was displeased with the way mathematics was taught to students at school, the German author decided to pen a book that teaches mathematics in an innovative way. German illustrator Rotraut Susanne Berner provided many full-page illustrations, as well as smaller drawings, for the book. The Number Devil was first published in German in 1997. The Number Devil has been noted for its unorthodox abandonment of standard notation; instead, Enzensberger created a variety of fictional terms to help describe mathematical concepts. For instance, exponentiation takes the term hopping, and the fictional term unreasonable numbers was coined for irrational numbers. The UCLA Professor of Slavic Languages Michael Henry Heim translated the book from German to English. The translation was particularly difficult in that it required special attention to the numerical aspect of the book. He was also challenged by the necessity to use simple English words appropriate for the target audience of The Number Devil—that is, children aged eleven to fourteen. The mathematics book was then published in English in 1998.

The book was a hit across Europe, becoming a best seller in at least Spain, Germany, the Netherlands, and Italy. The Number Devil also had considerable success in Japan. After the success of The Number Devil, Enzensberger wrote a follow-up, called Where Were You, Robert?, a children's book focusing on history rather than math. The German author has since stated he will not write any more young adult's books, but instead direct his effort towards poetry. Viva Media later published an educational computer game, similarly titled The Number Devil: A Mathematical Adventure, based on the book. An audiobook was also released for The Number Devil.

== Reception ==
The Number Devil received mostly positive reviews from critics. Mathematics professor John Allen Paulos of Temple University wrote an article for The New York Review of Books, praising The Number Devil as a "charming numerical fairy tale for children." Likewise, mathematics writer Martin Gardner of the Los Angeles Times applauded Enzensberger's introduction of mathematics "in such an entertaining way." In a book review for The Baltimore Sun, Michael Pakenham approved of the book's simplicity, writing, "it's not incomprehensible. Not for a minute."

Not all reviews were positive, however. The American Mathematical Society's Deborah Loewenberg Ball and Hyman Bass reviewed the book from a mathematical perspective. Although they praised its "attractive and imaginative fantasy," the two mathematicians found several issues. Ball and Bass were concerned with The Number Devil's negative characterization of math teachers, its apparent presentation of mathematics as magical rather than factual, and a number of other contentions. Ted Dewan, writing for the Times Educational Supplement, believed it to be "far more compelling than a standard text," but found it less adventurous than he hoped for. He also criticized its use in mathematics education, stating "I suspect this is the sort of book that well-meaning adults will mistakenly thrust upon children because it will be good for them."
