= Europe, Europe =

1987 book by Hans Magnus Enzensberger

Europe, Europe: Forays into a Continent
- Author: Hans Magnus Enzensberger
- Original title: Ach Europa! Wahrnehmungen aus sieben Ländern
- Translator: Martin Chalmers
- Language: German
- Publisher: Suhrkamp Verlag
- Publication date: 1987
- Publication place: West Germany
- English publication date: 19 May 1989
- Pages: 501
- ISBN: 3518381903

Europe, Europe: Forays into a Continent (German: Ach Europa! Wahrnehmungen aus sieben Ländern. Mit Einem Epilog aus dem Jahre 2006) is a 1987 book by the German writer Hans Magnus Enzensberger. It is about the contemporary state of Europe, with chapters about Enzensberger's recent visits to Sweden, Italy, Hungary, Portugal, Poland and Spain. The book ends with a piece of fiction where an American journalist imagines Europe in the 21st century. The book was published in English translation on 19 May 1989.
