= Rotraut Susanne Berner =

German graphic designer and illustrator (born 1948)

Rotraut Susanne Berner (born 26 August 1948, in Stuttgart) is a German graphic designer and illustrator. She illustrated The Number Devil by Hans Magnus Enzensberger.

== Career ==
She is well known for a series of popular children's book, called Wimmelbilderbuch, which have attained a worldwide circulation of close to 500,000 copies in fifteen countries.

Working as a freelance illustrator, she has focused on books for children and young adults, illustrating more than 80 such books and designing over 800 book covers.

For her contribution as a children's illustrator Berner was a finalist for the biennial, international Hans Christian Andersen Award in 2002, 2004, and 2014, and she won it in 2016.
