= Poetry and People International Poetry Prize =

Annual lifetime achievement award for poets

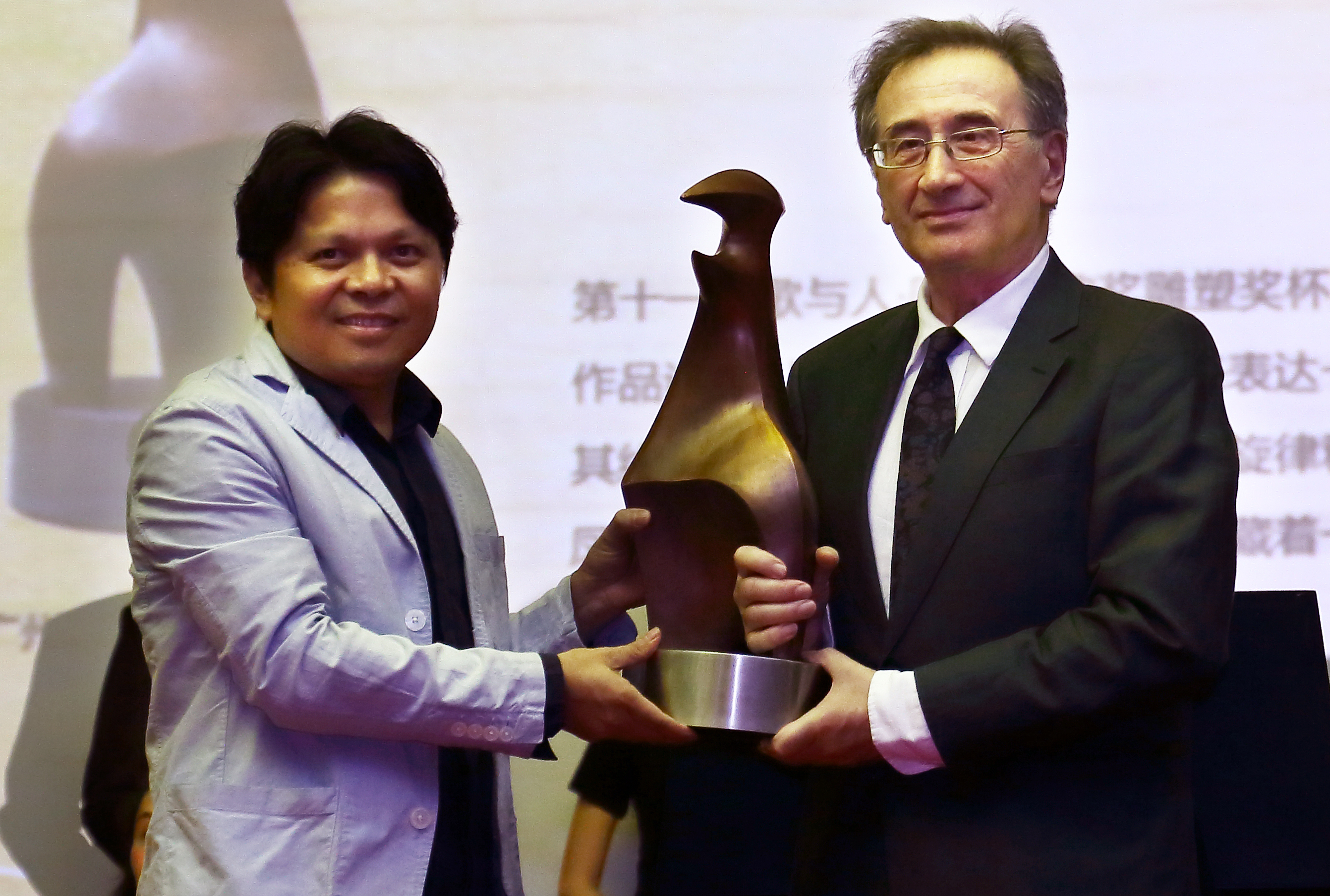
- Huang Lihai presents George Szirtes with Poetry and People Prize
- Awarded for: lifetime achievement in poetry
- Country: China
- Presented by: Poetry and People Magazine
- First award: 2005

The Poetry and People International Poetry Prize is an annual international lifetime achievement award given to poets around the world by the poetry magazine Poetry and People and its founder Huang Lihai. The first “Poetry and People Poet Prize” was awarded in 2005 to Eugénio de Andrade, before it changed its name to “Poetry and People International Poetry Prize”. Recipients since have included Derek Walcott, Lan Lan, Xi Chuan and Rita Dove. The prize was given to Tomas Tranströmer in April 2011, six months before it was announced that he was to be awarded the Nobel Prize for Literature.

== Poetry and People Magazine ==
Poetry and People magazine was established in 1999 in Guangzhou by the poet Huang Lihai. It has been described by poet Zhai Yongming as “the number 1 people's poetry publication". Special Issues have included "The 70s Generation", "Women's Poetry" and "Poetry in Translation".

== Prizewinners ==
The prizewinner is selected by Huang Lihai. Past winners are:

- 2005: Eugénio de Andrade
- 2007: Peng Yanjiao
- 2008: Zhang Shuguang
- 2009: Lan Lan
- 2010: Inna Lisnyanskaya
- 2011: Tomas Tranströmer
- 2012: Tomaž Šalamun
- 2013: Dong Dangzi
- 2014: Adam Zagajewski
- 2015: Rita Dove and Xi Chuan
- 2016: George Szirtes and Derek Walcott
- 2017: Hans Magnus Enzensberger
- 2021: Gary Snyder
