= Palatsi (opera) =

Opera in three acts by Aulis Sallinen

Palatsi The Palace
- Opera by Aulis Sallinen
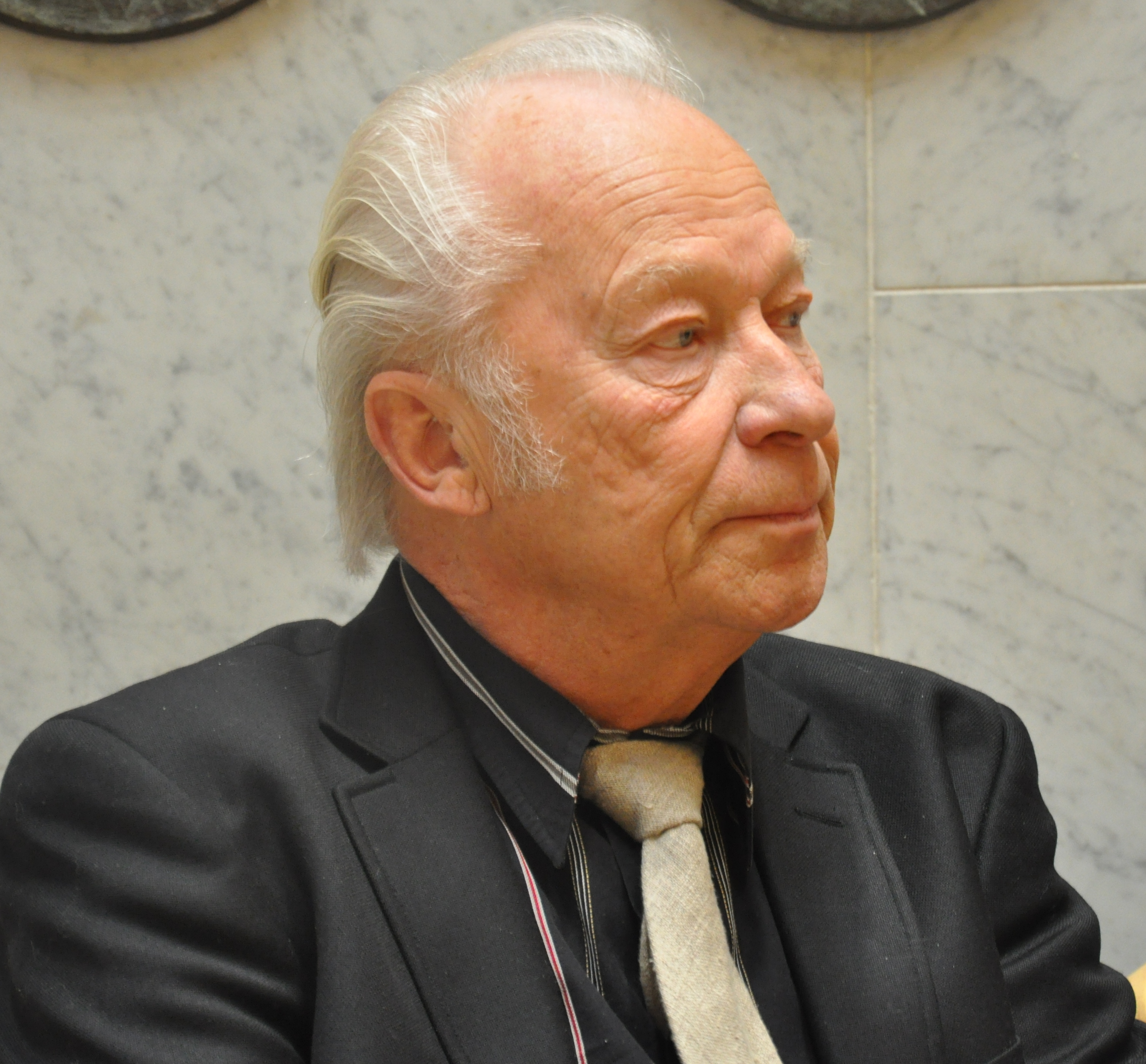
- Aulis Sallinen in 2009
- Librettist: Irene Dische; Hans Magnus Enzensberger
- Language: Finnish
- Premiere: 26 July 1995; Savonlinna Opera Festival

Palatsi (The Palace) is an opera in three acts, Op. 68, composed by Aulis Sallinen, on a libretto by Irene Dische and Hans Magnus Enzensberger. The translation of the libretto into Finnish was by the composer.

== Background ==
The opera was commissioned by the Savonlinna Opera Festival and composed between 1991 and 1993.

Palatsi was first performed on 26 July 1995 at the Savonlinna Opera Festival. It was recorded and issued on CD by Koch Classics, and a performance of the opera was filmed by Ondine and issued as a DVD which included interviews with the composer, librettists, conductor and other members of the production team.

The scenario of Sallinen's fifth opera, between Kullervo (Los Angeles 1992) and King Lear (Helsinki 2000) is loosely based on Mozart's 1781 singspiel Die Entführung aus dem Serail, and on Ryszard Kapuściński's 1978 book The Emperor: Downfall of an Autocrat which described the fall of Haile Selassie, last Emperor of Ethiopia.

Rodney Milnes described the work as "almost as enigmatic as The King Goes Forth to France, but lighter in tone, a sort of late-20th-century operetta". Critic Michael White reported that "you can legitimately describe anything in late-20th-century opera as 'ravishing' is, of course, something in itself. The music of The Palace is unnervingly attractive: easy on the ear but seriously worked and laced with tension. It is good to hear and grateful to sing…".

The Palace Rhapsody (1996), based on themes from the opera, was commissioned by the Royal Northern College of Music and is in the style of the harmonie arrangements of 18th century operas.

A satire of the collapse of a corrupt regime, The Palace deals with how authoritarian power is wielded and its debilitating effect on those near its centre, which forms a compelling need for them to escape and be free. In the end politics ruthlessly transfers power into new hands where it becomes just as absolute as before.

== Roles ==
| Role | Voice type | Premiere cast, 26 July 1995, (Conductor: Okko Kamu) |
|---|---|---|
| Kuningas (The King) | tenor | Veijo Varpio |
| Constance | soprano | Jaana Mantynen |
| Valmonte | baritone | Sauli Tilikainen |
| Petruccio | tenor | Jorma Silvasti |
| Ossip | bass-baritone | Tom Krause |
| Kitty | soprano | Ritva-Liisa Korhonen |
| The Physician | tenor | Pertti Makela |
| The Pillow Bearer | tenor | Lassi Virtanen |
| The Keeper of the Purse | baritone | Sami Luttinen |
| Mestaaja (The Executioner) | bass | Mart Mikk |
Courtiers, petitioners, beggars

== Orchestration ==
Flutes 2 (1 piccolo), oboes 2, clarinets 2 (1), bassoons 2 (1 contra), horns 4, trumpets 2, trombone, tuba, harp, piano, strings.

== Synopsis ==
=== Prologue ===
It is early morning in the hall of the palace. Petruccio and Ossip, confidants of the King are discussing why he has not left his bedchamber for three days. Courtiers enter and sing a traditional morning song. Ossip eventually decides to go and see the King but is prevented by Valmonte. Valmonte sends in the ruler's doctor. The Pillow Bearer, Keeper of the Purse and Executioner also voice their concerns over the King's absence. The situation also perturbs the courtiers, who are instructed by Valmonte to get continue with their work.

=== Act 1 ===
Three days later, Petruccio rehearses the courtiers for the traditional morning hymn. Valmonte approaches him, and asks how he may gain advancement at the court; Petruccio agrees to assist him and praises Valmonte when he sees Ossip. The latter however, is very suspicious of the new arrival.

The Cuckoo sets out the rota of the morning ceremonies at the palace. The King (or Bassa) enters with Queen Constance, and the court sings the morning song. The King only speaks through the voice of Constance, fearing his own words. When he learns that Valmonte has new skills acquired from abroad – such as being able to read the stars – the Bassa makes him Keeper of the Imperial Door and Secretary of Future Affairs. Constance is also fascinated by the newcomer.

=== Act 2 ===
In the palace gardens later the same day Petruccio and Ossip are plotting to obtain favours from the King and criticizing each other. Kitty, a lady-in-waiting and Ossip's wife, is bored with her husband. Constance is also tired of the dreary life in the palace and having to be the voice of her husband. Valmonte tells her about the freedom and pleasures outside and suggests that she flee with him. Constance hesitates, as she is afraid of the unknown world outside the Palace. Kitty sets out a plan for her and Constance to escape from the palace during the feast that day by mingling in the crowd of beggars. The King overhears their conversation.

=== Act 3 ===
Later, the beggars are allowed in through the gates according to custom for the evening feast, and they beat on their plates for food. The King, disguised as one of them, sings a song to try to convince the Queen to remain in the palace. Ossip, not recognizing the King in disguise, believes him to be a troublemaker and orders the King to be arrested and beaten. As the beggars are sent away from the palace Constance and Kitty flee. The main gates of the palace are then shut and quiet descends, the Royal bedchamber doors open and Valmonte emerges, with an escort and bearing the insignia of the autocrat.
