= Hans Faverey =

Dutch poet (1933–1990)

- Born: Hans Antonius Faverey; 14 September 1933; Paramaribo, Suriname
- Died: 8 July 1990 (aged 56); Amsterdam, Netherlands
- Occupations: Psychologist, poet
- Years active: 1962-1990
- Notable work: Chrysanten, roeiers

Hans Antonius Faverey (14 September 1933, in Paramaribo – 8 July 1990, in Amsterdam) was a Dutch poet of Surinamese descent. Besides being a poet, he was a lecturer at the psychology department of the Universiteit Leiden.

== Biography ==
Faverey was born in Suriname, but moved to the Netherlands in 1939. He graduated from the University of Amsterdam, and was a psychologist by profession. In 1959 he married the poet Lela Zečković, and in 1965 started to work at the University of Leiden as a lecturer in clinical psychology.. He lived all his adult life in Amsterdam.

== Career ==
Faverey's poetry was initially thought of as dense and difficult, though Faverey usually laughed at such remarks, saying that it really "is not that hard". His first two collections gained little critical attention; nevertheless, he received the Poetry Award from the city of Amsterdam for his debut volume, Gedichten ("Poems").

In 1977, Faverey published Chrysanten, Roeiers for which he was awarded the Jan Campert Prize.. From then on Faverey's poetry quickly became accepted as part of the Dutch literary canon, within the experimental stream pioneered by poets such as Gerrit Kouwenaar. Nowadays, in fact, Faverey is "considered one of the greatest and most influential Dutch poets of the twentieth century". In the words of writer J. M. Coetzee, who translated his poems into English, "Hans Faverey was the purest poetic intelligence of his generation, the author of poems of lapidary beauty that echo in the mind long after the book is closed".The number of critical studies of his work is also steadily increasing - to the point where Faverey seems to be on a par with his slightly older peers Kouwenaar and Lucebert. He is buried at Zorgvlied cemetery in Amsterdam.

== Honors and awards ==
- 1969 – Amsterdam Poetry Award for Gedichten
- 1977 – Jan Campert Award for Chrysanten, roeiers
- 1990 – Constantijn Huygens Prize for his entire oeuvre

== Bibliography ==
Original collections

- 1968 – Gedichten
- 1972 – Gedichten 2
- 1977 – Chrysanten, roeiers
- 1978 – Lichtval
- 1980 – Gedichten
- 1983 – Zijden Kettingen
- 1985 – Hinderlijke goden
- 1988 – Tegen het vergeten
- 1990 – Het ontbrokene
- 1993 – Verzamelde gedichten
- 2000 – Springvossen
- 2010 – Gedichten 1962-1990
- 2021 – Verborgen in het zichtbare

Book-length translations of Faverey's work

- English: Against the Forgetting: Selected Poems, tr. Francis R. Jones (London: Anvil, 1994)
- English: Against the Forgetting: Selected Poems, updated and expanded edition, tr. Francis R. Jones (New York: New Directions, 2004)
- English: Chrysanthemums, rowers, tr. Francis R. Jones and Lela Faverey (Providence, RI: Leon Works, 2011)
- Farsi: Selected Poems, tr. from English by Amir Afrassiabi (Teheran: Sarzamin-i-Ahurai, 2023)
- French: Contre l'oubli, tr. Henk van der Waal and Joke J. Hermsen (Paris: Joany, 1991)
- French: Sur place, tr. Jan H. Mysjkin and Pierre Gallissaires (Ghent: Ergo, 2006)
- French: Poèmes, tr. Érik Suchère and Erik Lindner (Courbevoie: Théâtre Typographique, 2012)
- French: Poésies, tr. Kim Andringa and Erik Lindner (Brussels: Vies Parallèles, 2019)
- German: Gegen das vergessen: Gedichte, tr. Rosemarie Still (Münster: Kleinheinrich, 1991)
- Italian: Contro l’oblio, tr.Patrizia Filia (Martinsicuro: Di Felice, 2021)
