= Judith Wilkinson =

British poet and translator

- Occupations: Poet, translator
- Website: www.judithwilkinson.net

Judith Wilkinson is a British poet and translator, living in Groningen, the Netherlands. She is known for her translations of Dutch and Flemish poetry into English. She has translated the works of Toon Tellegen, Miriam Van Hee, Menno Wigman and Hagar Peeters.

== Awards and honours ==
- 2007: Runner-up David Reid Poetry Translation Prize
- 2007: Poetry Book Society Recommendation for Instead of Silence by Miriam Van hee.
- 2008: First prize David Reid Poetry Translation Prize.
- 2009: Runner-up David Reid Poetry Translation Prize.
- 2011: Popescu Prize for European Poetry in Translation for Raptors by Toon Tellegen.
- 2013: Brockway Prize.
- 2019: Pushcart Prize, nominated by The Manhattan Review
- 2021: Menno Wigman, The World by Evening, longlisted for the Vondel Prize

== Poetry collections ==
- Judith Wilkinson, Tightrope Dancer, Shoestring Press 2010
- Judith Wilkinson, Canyon Journey, with artwork by Ditty Doornbos, Shoestring Press 2016
- Judith Wilkinson, In Desert, Shoestring Press 2021
- Judith Wilkinson, Sphinx Moth, Poetry Salzburg 2026

== Translated titles ==
- Miriam Van hee, Instead of Silence, Shoestring Press 2007
- Toon Tellegen, About Love and About Nothing Else, Shoestring Press 2008
- Toon Tellegen, Raptors, Carcanet Press 2011
- Toon Tellegen, A Man and an Angel, Shoestring Press 2013
- Hagar Peeters, City of Sandcastles, Shoestring Press 2018
- Toon Tellegen, Under a Giant Sky, Selected Poems, Shoestring Press 2019
- Maya Wuytack, Nothing Chronic (Except Love), WA Poets Inc 2019
- Menno Wigman, The World by Evening, Shearsman Books, 2020
- Hanny Michaelis, In an Unguarded Moment, Selected Poems, Shoestring Press 2022
- Toon Tellegen, A Slippery Slope, Shoestring Press 2023
- Miriam Van hee, Sediment of Light, Selected Poems, Shoestring Press 2025
- Alara Adilow, Myths and Traffic Lights, Selected Poems, Shearsman Books 2026

== Poetry performed ==
The Kosh, Just Below the Surface, poetry by Judith Wilkinson, 1995.
