= Mausoleum: Thirty Seven Ballads from the History of Progress =

1975 poetry collection by Hans Magnus Enzensberger

Mausoleum
- Author: Hans Magnus Enzensberger
- Translator: Joachim Neugroschel
- Language: German
- Publisher: Suhrkamp Verlag
- Publication date: 1975
- Publication place: West Germany
- English publication date: 1976
- Pages: 125

Mausoleum: Thirty Seven Ballads from the History of Progress (German: Mausoleum. Siebenunddreißig Balladen aus der Geschichte des Fortschritts) is a 1975 poetry collection by the German writer Hans Magnus Enzensberger. It portrays 37 people Enzensberger regarded as the spiritual fathers of civilisation, presented only by their initials.

The book has been interpreted as a critique of technological progress and a turn toward ecology, expressed as an interest in botany and botanists.
