= Esther Kinsky =

German literary translator and author (born 1956)

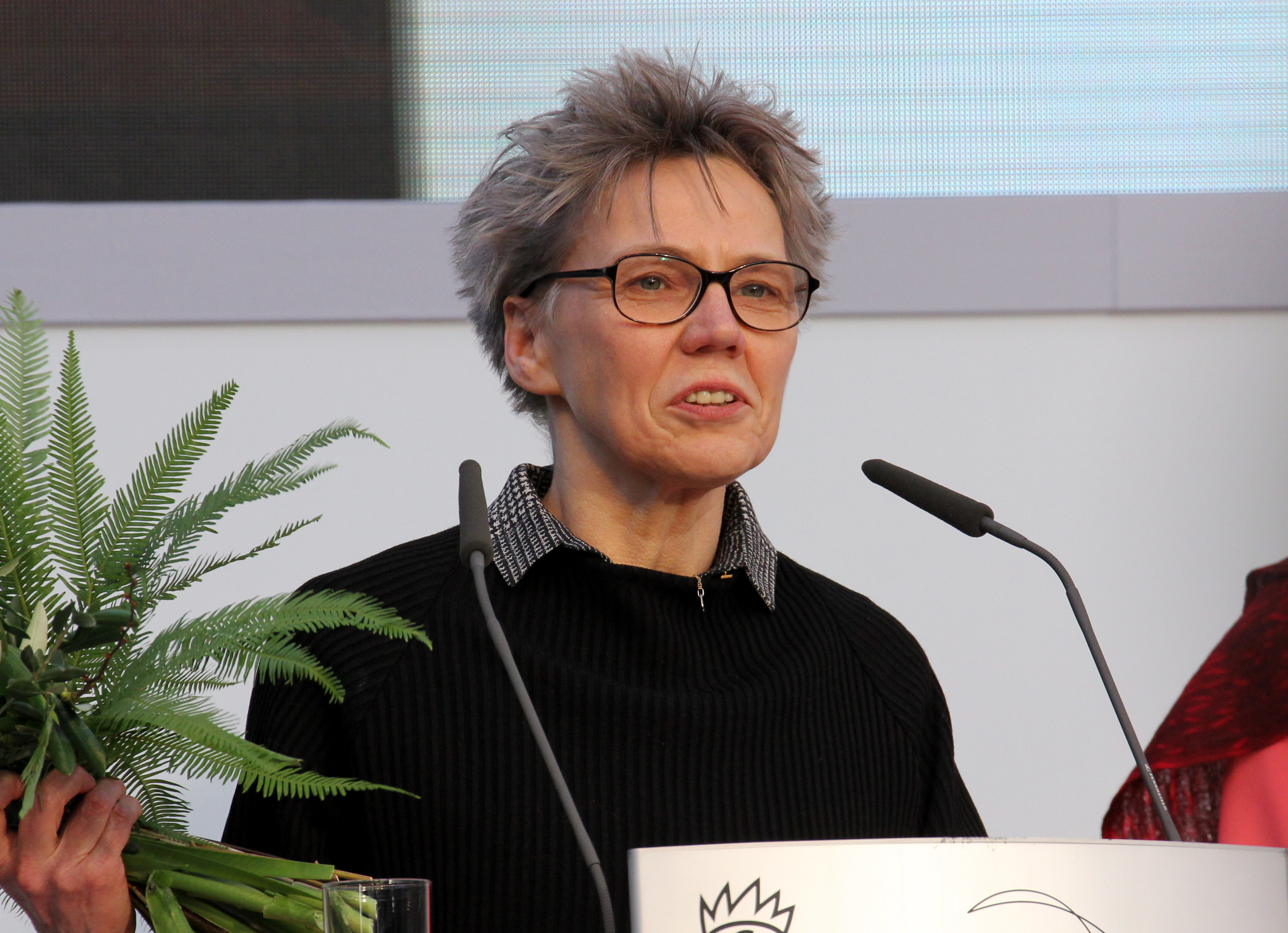
Kinsky speaking at the Leipzig Book Fair in 2018

Esther Kinsky (born 1956 in Engelskirchen, North Rhine-Westphalia, Germany) is a German literary translator and the author of novels and poetry.

== Life and works ==
Esther Kinsky grew up in North Rhine-Westphalia and read Slavonic studies at Bonn. She works as a literary translator from the Polish, English and Russian languages into German and as the author of prose and poetry. After spending some years in London, she settled in Berlin.

Among her noted works are the novel Am Fluss, published by Matthes & Seitz, Berlin 2014 and appearing in English in January 2018 as River, translated by Iain Galbraith and published by Fitzcarraldo Editions.

Kinsky has received many awards both for her literary work and her translations, including in 2015 the Kranichsteiner Literature Prize and, for Am Fluss, the Preis der SWR-Bestenliste of Baden-Baden. In 2024, she received the Droste Prize.

From the summer semester of 2016 she held the annual Thomas Kling lectureship in Poetry at the University of Bonn. During the 2017/2018 fall/winter semester she was the August Wilhelm von Schlegel Visiting Professor of the Poetics of Translation at the Free University of Berlin.

In 2018 her novel, Hain: Geländeroman was published by Suhrkamp Verlag, Berlin, and won the Belletristik (Belles Lettres) category of the Leipzig Book Fair Prize, 2018. This work has been published in an English translation by Caroline Schmidt as Grove: A Field Novel (Fitzcarraldo Editions, 2020). In 2023 she wrote Seeing Further, a non-fiction recounting of her purchase and restoration of a small cinema in Hungary. It is published in English by Fitzcarraldo Editions, trans. Caroline Schmidt (2024).

Kinsky was married to the German-Scottish literary translator Martin Chalmers (1948–2014).

== Novels ==
- Kinsky, Esther (2014). Am Fluss. Berlin. ISBN 978-3-95757-056-7. OCLC 878177983.
- —— (2018). Hain Geländeroman. Berlin: Suhrkamp Verlag. ISBN 978-3-518-42789-7. OCLC 1008600257.
- —— (2023). Weiter Sehen. Von der unwiderstehlichen Magie des Kinos. Berlin: Suhrkamp Verlag. ISBN 978-3-518-22544-8.

=== English translations ===
- Kinsky, Esther (2018). River. Translated by Galbraith, Iain. Oakland, California. ISBN 978-1-945492-19-8. OCLC 1052766428.
- —— (2020). Grove : a field novel. Translated by Schmidt, Caroline. Oakland, California. ISBN 978-1-945492-38-9. OCLC 1121603799.
- —— (2022). Rombo. Translated by Schmidt, Caroline. New York. ISBN 978-1-68137-725-4.
- —— (2023). Seeing Further. Translated by Schmidt, Caroline. Great Britain. ISBN 978-1-80427-116-2.
