= Kiosk (poetry collection) =

1995 poetry collection by Hans Magnus Enzensberger

- Title page for Kiosk (1999)
- Author: Hans Magnus Enzensberger
- Translator: Michael Hamburger
- Language: German
- Publisher: Suhrkamp Verlag
- Publication date: 7 March 1995
- Publication place: Germany
- English publication date: 1999
- Pages: 134
- ISBN: 978-3-518-40680-9

Kiosk is a 1995 poetry collection by the German writer Hans Magnus Enzensberger.

== Summary ==
The book is divided into four parts, titled "Historical Patchwork" (Geschichtsklitterung), "Mixed Feelings" (Gemischte Gefühle), "Diversions under the Cranium" (Belustigungen unter der Hirnschale) and "In Suspense" (In der Schwebe). They are connected by the longer poem "Flight of Ideas" (Gedankenflucht), which is split into four parts spread around the book.

== Publication ==
Suhrkamp Verlag published Kiosk in German on 7 March 1995. Sheep Meadow Press published an English interpretation by Michael Hamburger in 1999.

Publishers Weekly wrote that Enzensberger is "a master of deflating senses of middle-class accomplishment, his own often foremost among them", but that Kiosk presents a more forgiving side of him, where he allows more free "observations and speculations on nature, evolution and mind".
