= Hans Magnus Enzensberger =

German writer and editor (1929–2022)

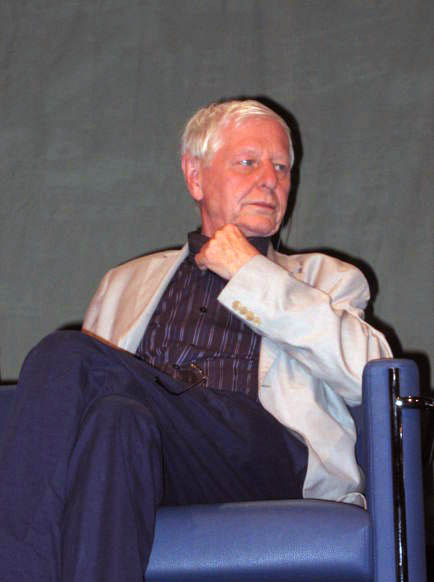
- Enzensberger in 2006
- Born: 11 November 1929; Kaufbeuren, Bavaria, Germany
- Died: 24 November 2022 (aged 93); Munich, Bavaria, Germany
- Education: University of Erlangen–Nuremberg
- Occupation: Writer
- Writing career
- Pen name: Andreas Thalmayr; Giorgio Pellizzi; Linda Quilt; Elisabeth Ambras
- Language: German
- Genres: Poetry; essay; novel
- Notable works: The Number Devil; Der Untergang der Titanic
- Notable awards: Georg Büchner Prize; Heinrich-Böll-Preis; Heinrich Heine Prize; Prince of Asturias Awards; Griffin Poetry Prize; Sonning Prize

Signature
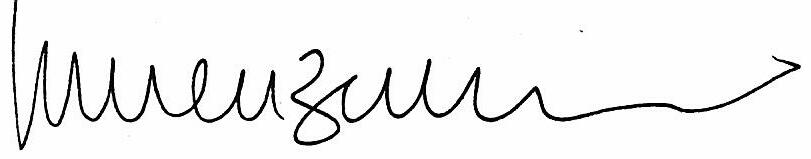

Hans Magnus Enzensberger (11 November 1929 – 24 November 2022) was a German author, poet, playwright, essayist, translator, and editor. He also wrote under the pseudonyms Andreas Thalmayr, Elisabeth Ambras, Linda Quilt and Giorgio Pellizzi. Enzensberger was regarded as one of the literary founding figures of the Federal Republic of Germany and wrote more than 70 books, with works translated into 40 languages. He was one of the leading authors in Group 47, and influenced the 1968 West German student movement. He was awarded the Georg Büchner Prize and the Pour le Mérite, among many others.

== Life and career ==
Enzensberger was born in 1929 in Kaufbeuren, a small town in Bavaria, as the eldest of four boys. His father, Andreas Enzensberger, worked as a telecommunications technician, and his mother, Leonore (Ledermann) Enzensberger, a kindergarten teacher. Enzensberger was part of the last generation of intellectuals whose writing was shaped by first-hand experience of Nazi Germany. (Note: Contemporaries include Günter Grass (1927–2015), Martin Walser (born 1927) and Jürgen Habermas (born 1929).) The Enzensberger family moved to Nuremberg in 1931. Julius Streicher, the founder and publisher of the virulently antisemitic Der Stürmer, was their next-door neighbour. Hans Magnus joined the Hitler Youth in his teens, but was expelled soon afterwards. "I have always been incapable of being a good comrade. I can't stay in line. It's not in my character. It may be a defect, but I can't help it."

In 1949, after completing his Abitur in Nördlingen, Enzensberger studied literature and philosophy at the universities of Erlangen, Freiburg, and Hamburg, and at the Sorbonne in Paris, receiving his doctorate in 1955 for a thesis about Clemens Brentano's poetry. Until 1957 he worked as a radio editor in Stuttgart with Alfred Andersch; he criticized in a radio essay Der Spiegel's language style. He became one of the leading authors in the Group 47, an institution that shaped the culture of Germany after World War II. In 1957 Group 47 member Ingeborg Bachmann and Enzensberger began to exchange letters. His first literary publication was the poem collection verteidigung der wölfe (Defense of the Wolves) in 1957, followed by landessprache in 1960, both originally in all-lowercase. They were perceived as opposition to the establishment of those who had been on battle fields and in camps, described as "furious, elegant and of controlled rage" ("furios, elegant und von kontrollierter Wut"). He played the role "zorniger junger Mann" (angry young man) as British role models. In 1960, he was the editor of Museum der modernen Poesie (Museum of modern poetry), an anthology of poems by contemporary authors in a juxtaposition of original and translation, which was rare at the time. From 1960 to 1961, Enzensberger was a literary editor (Verlagslektor) at Suhrkamp in Frankfurt. He spoke several languages, intensified by travels: English, French, Italian, Spanish, Norwegian, Swedish and some Russian. With a volume of essays published in 1962, Einzelheiten, he entered the position of a critical intellectual which he held for life.

Between 1965 and 1975 he lived briefly in the United States as Fellow of the Center for Advanced Studies Wesleyan University, from which he resigned on January 31, 1968 stating "I believe the class which rules the United States of America, and the government which implements its policies, to be the most dangerous body of men on earth" and further stating his intention to go and work in Cuba. His letter of resignation was published in The New York Review. (Note: Enzensberger left the United States prematurely in protest against US foreign policy.) He had the composer Hans Werner Henze invited to Cuba in 1969, and wrote the libretto for his El Cimarrón for baritone and three instrumentalists based on the memories of the escaped slave Esteban Montejo.

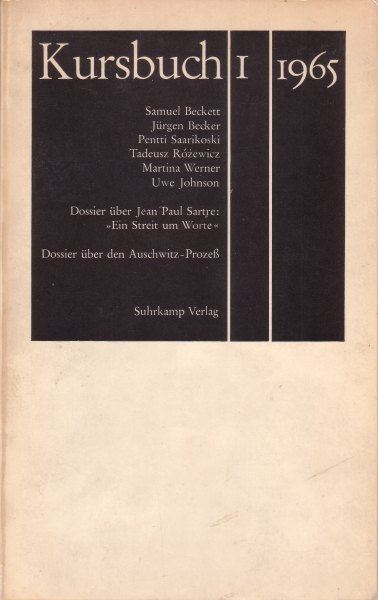
Kursbuch, first edition

From 1965, Enzensberger edited the magazine Kursbuch; his writings influenced the 1968 West German student movement. He was editor of the prestigious book series Die Andere Bibliothek, published in Frankfurt, from 1985; it reached almost 250 titles. He promoted the writers Ryszard Kapuscinski, Raoul Schrott, Irene Dische, Christoph Ransmayr, and W.G. Sebald, among others. Together with Gaston Salvatore, Enzensberger was the founder of the left-wing monthly TransAtlantik. The literary journal survived for only two years.

In his 1987 book Ach Europa! Wahrnehmungen aus sieben Ländern, Enzensberger used already the terms Ossi and Wessi.

== Personal life ==
Enzensberger was the older brother of the author Christian Enzensberger. He was married three times, including once to Masha Enzensberger, and had two daughters, including Theresia Enzensberger. Mathematics was his passion.

Enzensberger lived in Norway, Italy, Mexico, Cuba, the United States, West Berlin, and from 1979 onward in Munich where he died on 24 November 2022, at age 93.

== Work ==
Enzensberger wrote in a sarcastic, ironic tone in many of his poems. For example, the poem "Middle Class Blues" consists of various typicalities of middle class life, with the phrase "we can't complain" repeated several times, and concludes with "what are we waiting for?". Many of his poems also feature themes of civil unrest over economic- and class-based issues. Though primarily a poet and essayist, he also ventured into theatre, film, opera, radio drama, reportage and translation. He wrote novels and several books for children (including The Number Devil, an exploration of mathematics, translated in 34 languages) and was co-author of a book for German as a foreign language, (Die Suche). He often wrote his poems and letters in lower case. Tumult, written in 2014, is an autobiographical reflection of his 1960s as a left-wing sympathizer visiting the Soviet Union and Cuba. His own work has been translated into more than 40 languages.

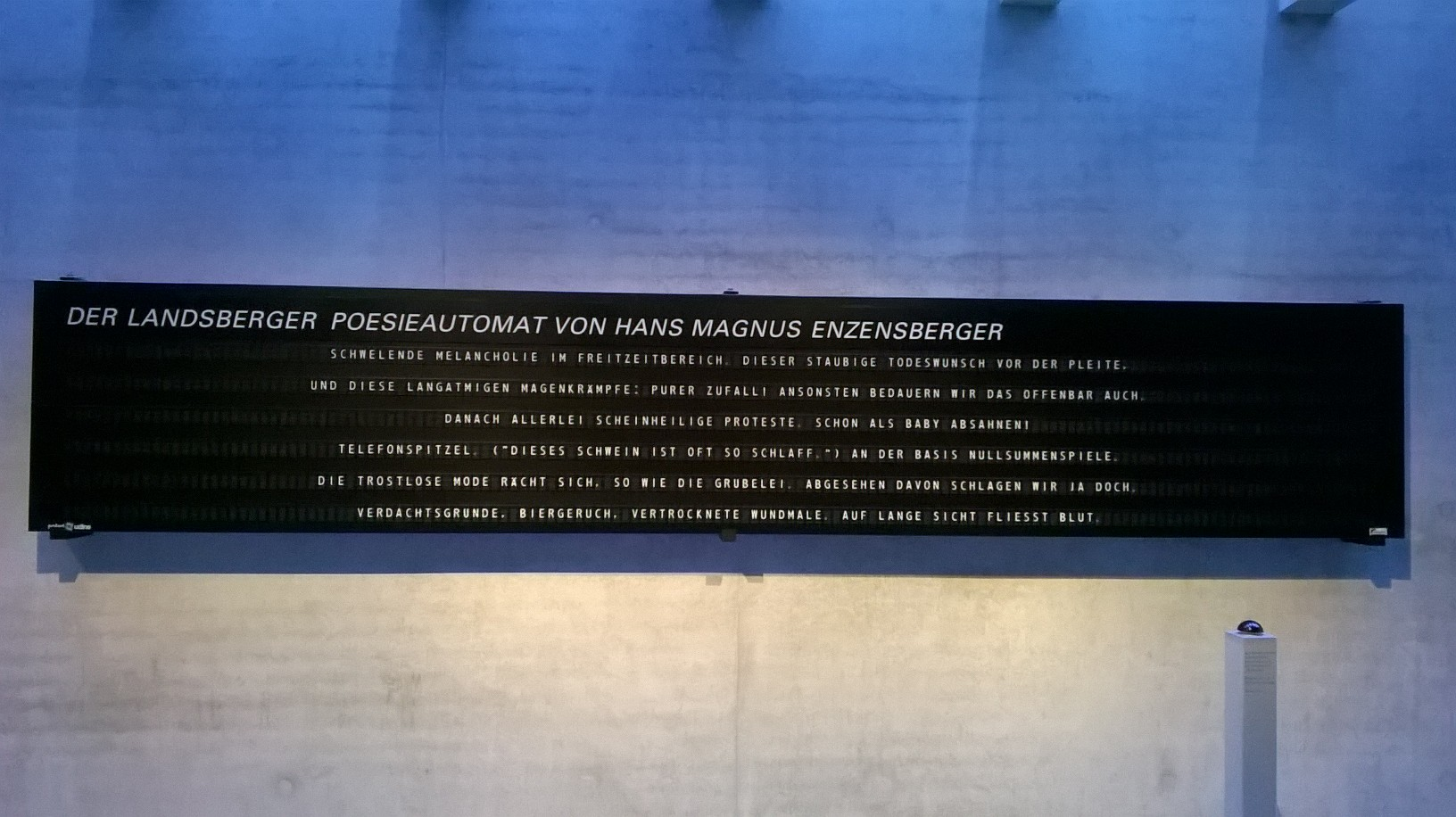
Landsberger Poesieautomat (Poetry-Machine)

Enzensberger also invented and collaborated in the construction of a machine which automatically composes poems (Landsberger Poesieautomat). This was used during the 2006 Football World Cup to commentate on games.

Enzensberger criticized the German orthography reform, the dominance of the internet and the construction of the EU.

Enzensberger translated Adam Zagajewski, Lars Gustafsson, Pablo Neruda, W. H. Auden and César Vallejo. With Irene Dische he wrote the libretto for Sallinen's fifth opera The Palace. The theatre premiere of a drama after his long poem Der Untergang der Titanic on 7 May 1980 was directed by George Tabori at the Werkraumtheater Munich.

=== "Consciousness industry" ===
Enzensberger's 1974 work The consciousness industry; on literature, politics and the media gave rise to the term "consciousness industry", which identifies the mechanisms through which the human mind is reproduced as a social product. Foremost among these mechanisms are the institutions of mass media and education. According to Enzensberger, the mind industry does not produce anything specific; rather, its main business is to perpetuate the existing order of man's domination over man. Hans Haacke elaborates on the consciousness industry as it applies to the arts in a wider system of production, distribution, and consumption. Haacke specifically implicates museums as manufacturers of aesthetic perception that fail to acknowledge their intellectual, political, and moral authority: "rather than sponsoring intelligent, critical awareness, museums thus tend to foster appeasement."

== Honors and awards ==
In 2009, Enzensberger received a special lifetime recognition award given by the trustees of the Griffin Trust for Excellence in Poetry, which also awards the annual Griffin Poetry Prize.

- 1951–1954 Grant from the Studienstiftung des Deutschen Volkes
- 1963 Georg Büchner Prize
- 1980 Golden Wreath of Struga Poetry Evenings
- 1985 Heinrich-Böll-Preis
- 1993 Erich-Maria-Remarque-Friedenspreis; see also Erich Maria Remarque
- 1997 Ernst-Robert-Curtius-Preis
- 1998 Heinrich Heine Prize of Düsseldorf
- 1999 Pour le Mérite for Sciences and Arts
- 2002 Prince of Asturias Communications and Humanities award
- 2002 Ludwig Börne Prize
- 2009 Griffin Poetry Prize Lifetime Recognition Award
- 2009 Sonning Prize – awarded for "commendable work for the benefit of European culture"
- 2012 Honorary degree from Bard College in New York
- 2015 Frank-Schirrmacher-Preis
- 2017 Poetry and People International Poetry Prize

== Published works (selection) ==
- Enzensberger, Hans Magnus (1981) [1957]. Verteidigung der Wölfe : Gedichte (in German). Frankfurt am Main: Suhrkamp. ISBN 3-518-01711-X. OCLC 7589588.
- Enzensberger, Hans Magnus (1969) [1960]. Landessprache. Gedichte (in German). (Frankfurt a.M.): Suhrkamp. ISBN 3-518-10304-0. OCLC 1820152.
- Enzensberger, Hans Magnus (2012). Allerleirauh viele schöne Kinderreime (in German). Berlin. ISBN 978-3-458-17535-3. OCLC 779627444.
- Enzensberger, Hans Magnus (1964). Einzelheiten, I. Bewusstseins-Industrie (in German). Frankfurt am Main: Suhrkamp. ISBN 3-518-10063-7. OCLC 16841964.
- Enzensberger, Hans Magnus (1978). Politik und Verbrechen : neun Beiträge (in German). Frankfurt: Suhrkamp. ISBN 3-518-36942-3. OCLC 610973978.
- Enzensberger, Hans Magnus (1967). Blindenschrift (in German). Frankfurt am Main: Suhrkamp. ISBN 3-518-10217-6. OCLC 489767810.
- Enzensberger, Hans Magnus (1967). Deutschland, Deutschland unter anderm : Äußerungen zur Politik (in German). Frankfurt am Main. ISBN 3-518-10203-6. OCLC 490053596.
- Enzensberger, Hans Magnus (1972). Der kurze Sommer der Anarchie; Buenaventura Durrutis Leben und Tod. Roman (in German). Frankfurt am Main]: Suhrkamp. ISBN 3-518-02760-3. OCLC 682651.
- Enzensberger, Hans Magnus (1981). Gespräche mit Marx und Engels (in German). Frankfurt am Main: Suhrkamp. ISBN 3-518-37216-5. OCLC 8736685.
- Enzensberger, Hans Magnus (1974). Palaver : polit. Überlegungen (1967-1973) (in German). Frankfurt, am Main: Suhrkamp. ISBN 3-518-00696-7. OCLC 1185400.
- Enzensberger, Hans Magnus (1978). Mausoleum : Siebenunddreissig Balladen aus der Geschichte des Fortschritts (in German). Frankfurt am Main: Suhrkamp. ISBN 3-518-01602-4. OCLC 9376137.
- Enzensberger, Hans Magnus (1985). Politische Brosamen (in German). Frankfurt am Main: Suhrkamp. ISBN 3-518-37632-2. OCLC 12842864.
- Enzensberger, Hans Magnus (1987). Ach Europa! : Wahrnehmungen aus sieben Ländern : mit einem Epilog aus dem Jahre 2006 (in German). Frankfurt am Main: Suhrkamp. ISBN 3-518-04432-X. OCLC 17677593.
- Enzensberger, Hans Magnus (1988). Mittelmass und Wahn : gesammelte Zerstreuungen (in German). Frankfurt am Main: Suhrkamp. ISBN 3-518-40131-9. OCLC 19025463.
- Enzensberger, Hans Magnus (1993). Zukunftsmusik (in German). Frankfurt am Main: Suhrkamp. ISBN 3-518-38723-5. OCLC 30121446.
- Enzensberger, Hans Magnus; Calderón de la Barca, Pedro (1992). Die Tochter der Luft : ein Schauspiel : nach dem Spanischen des Calderón de la Barca (in German). Frankfurt am Main: Suhrkamp. ISBN 3-518-40429-6. OCLC 25601695.
- Enzensberger, Hans Magnus (1994). Die grosse Wanderung dreiunddreissig Markierungen; mit einer Fussnote "Über einige Besonderheiten bei der Menschenjagd" (in German). Frankfurt am Main. ISBN 978-3-518-38834-1. OCLC 611293243.
- Kiosk. 1995. Suhrkamp Verlag. ISBN 978-3-518-40680-9
- Enzensberger, Hans Magnus (1997). Zickzack : Aufsätze (in German). Frankfurt: Suhrkamp. ISBN 3-518-40858-5. OCLC 37034067.
- Enzensberger, Hans Magnus; Glotz, Peter (1997). Baukasten zu einer Theorie der Medien : kritische Diskurse zur Pressefreiheit (in German). München: R. Fischer. ISBN 3-88927-162-6. OCLC 37001956.
- Enzensberger, Hans Magnus; Berner, Rotraut Susanne (1999). Der Zahlenteufel : ein Kopfkissenbuch für alle, die Angst vor der Mathematik haben (in German). München: Deutscher Taschenbuch Verlag. ISBN 3-423-62015-3. OCLC 44578757.
- Enzensberger, Hans Magnus (2000). Wo warst du, Robert?. Munich: Deutscher Taschenbuch Verlag. ISBN 3-423-62045-5. OCLC 47207398.
- Enzensberger, Hans Magnus (2005). Leichter als Luft : moralische Gedichte (in German). Frankfurt am Main: Suhrkamp. ISBN 3-518-45666-0. OCLC 57746201.
- Enzensberger, Hans Magnus (2006). Schreckens Männer : Versuch über den radikalen Verlierer (in German). Frankfurt am Main: Suhrkamp. ISBN 3-518-06820-2. OCLC 69019611.
- Enzensberger, Hans Magnus (1964). Einzelheiten, I. Bewusstseins-Industrie (in German). Frankfurt am Main: Suhrkamp. ISBN 3-518-10063-7. OCLC 16841964.
- Enzensberger, Hans Magnus (1984). Einzelheiten II : Poesie und Politik (in German). [Frankfurt am Main]: Suhrkamp. ISBN 3-518-10087-4. OCLC 18665474.
- Enzensberger, Hans Magnus (2006). Gedichte, 1950-2005 (in German). Frankfurt am Main: Suhrkamp. ISBN 978-3-518-45823-5. OCLC 76949101.
- Enzensberger, Hans Magnus (2007). Im Irrgarten der Intelligenz : ein Idiotenführer (in German). Frankfurt am Main: Suhrkamp. ISBN 978-3-518-12532-8. OCLC 170906920.
- Enzensberger, Hans Magnus (2008). Hammerstein, oder, Der Eigensinn : eine deutsche Geschichte (in German). Frankfurt am Main: Suhrkamp. ISBN 978-3-518-41960-1. OCLC 190795588.

=== Bibliography (English) ===
- Enzensberger, Hans Magnus; Hamburger, Michael; Totherberg, Jerome (1968). Poems for people who don't read poems. London: Secker & Warburg. ISBN 0-436-14820-X. OCLC 42322.
- Enzensberger, Hans Magnus; Roloff, Michael (1974). Politics and crime. New York. ISBN 0-8164-9224-7. OCLC 960135.
- Enzensberger, Hans Magnus; Roloff, Michael (1974). The consciousness industry; on literature, politics and the media. New York: Seabury Press. ISBN 0-8164-9185-2. OCLC 800583.
- Enzensberger, Hans Magnus (1974). The Havana inquiry. New York: Holt, Rinehart and Winston. ISBN 0-03-080197-4. OCLC 696857.
- Enzensberger, Hans Magnus (1976). Mausoleum : thirty-seven ballads from the history of progress. New York: Urizen Books. ISBN 0-916354-04-0. OCLC 2687581.
- Enzensberger, Hans Magnus (1976). Raids and reconstructions : essays on politics, crime, and culture. London: Pluto Press. ISBN 0-904383-16-4. OCLC 2848621.
- Enzensberger, Hans Magnus (1980). The sinking of the Titanic : a poem. Boston: Houghton Mifflin Co. ISBN 0-395-29120-8. OCLC 5889041.
- Enzensberger, Hans Magnus; Grimm, Reinhold; Armstrong, Bruce (1982). Critical essays. New York: Continuum. ISBN 0-8264-0258-5. OCLC 8109572.
- Enzensberger, Hans Magnus (1988). Dreamers of the absolute : essays on politics, crime, and culture. London: Raduis. ISBN 0-09-173240-9. OCLC 18625156.
- Enzensberger, Hans Magnus; Chalmers, Martin (1989). Europe, Europe : forays into a continent. New York: Pantheon Books. ISBN 0-394-55819-7. OCLC 18588651.
- Enzensberger, Hans Magnus (1990). Political crumbs. London: Verso. ISBN 0-86091-294-9. OCLC 21760466.
- Enzensberger, Hans Magnus; Dagerman, Stig (1990). Europa in Trümmern. Augenzeugenberichte aus den Jahren 1944 - 1948 (in German). Frankfurt am Main. ISBN 978-3-8218-4065-9. OCLC 243435191.
- Enzensberger, Hans Magnus (1992). Mediocrity and delusion : collected diversions. London: Verso. ISBN 0-86091-349-X. OCLC 24791891.
- Enzensberger, Hans Magnus; Hamburger, Michael (1999). Selected poems. Riverdale-on-Hudson, N.Y.: Sheep Meadow Press. ISBN 1-878818-73-2. OCLC 41026436.
- Enzensberger, Hans Magnus; Spence, Piers; Chalmers, Martin (1994). Civil wars : from L.A. to Bosnia. New York: New Press. ISBN 1-56584-208-1. OCLC 31314029.
- Enzensberger, Hans Magnus (1997). Zig zag : the politics of culture and vice versa. New York: New Press. ISBN 1-56584-436-X. OCLC 40487910.
- Enzensberger, Hans Magnus; Berner, Rotraut Susanne; Heim, Michael Henry (1998). The number devil : a mathematical adventure. New York. ISBN 0-8050-5770-6. OCLC 38162809.
- Kiosk. 1999. Sheep Meadow Press. Translated by Michael Hamburger. ISBN 978-1-878818-72-0
- Dische, Irene; Enzensberger, Hans Magnus; Sowa, Michael (2000). Esterhazy, the rabbit prince. Yeadin, PA: Image Connection. ISBN 0-9702768-3-4. OCLC 47627613.
- Enzensberger, Hans Magnus (2002). Lighter than air : moral poems. Tarset, Northumberland: Bloodaxe. ISBN 1-85224-580-8. OCLC 51669280.
- Enzensberger, Hans Magnus (2001). Where were you, Robert?. London: Puffin. ISBN 0-14-130680-7. OCLC 46908074.
- Enzensberger, Hans Magnus; Chalmers, Martin (2009). The silences of Hammerstein : a German story. London: Seagull Books. ISBN 978-1-906497-22-4. OCLC 318878364.
- Quilt, Linda; Sowa, Michael; Enzensberger, Hans Magnus (2010). Unlikely progeny. London: Seagull Books. ISBN 978-1-906497-66-8. OCLC 743436171.
- Enzensberger, Hans Magnus; Chalmers, Martin; Kinsky, Esther (2018). A history of clouds : 99 meditations. London. ISBN 978-0-85742-579-9. OCLC 1032026671.
- Enzensberger, Hans Magnus (2011). Fatal numbers : why count on chance. New York: Upper West Side Philosophers. ISBN 978-1-935830-01-6. OCLC 674931655.
- Enzensberger, Hans Magnus (2011). Brussels, the gentle monster : or the disenfranchisement of Europe. London: Seagull Books. ISBN 978-0-85742-023-7. OCLC 754168366.
- Enzensberger, Hans Magnus; Hoban, Wieland (2015). Mr Zed's reflections, or, Breadcrumbs he dropped, gathered up by his listeners. London. ISBN 978-0-85742-224-8. OCLC 927489699.
- Enzensberger, Hans Magnus; Mitchell, Mike (2018). Anarchy's brief summer : the life and death of Buenaventura Durruti : a novel. London. ISBN 978-0-85742-600-0. OCLC 1077270536.
- Enzensberger, Hans Magnus; Mitchell, Mike (2016). Tumult. London. ISBN 978-0-85742-370-2. OCLC 944087324.

=== Articles ===
- Enzensberger, H. M. (1 October 1976). "Tour of the City". Telos. 1976 (29). Telos Press: 2. doi:10.3817/0976029002. ISSN 0090-6514. S2CID 144882883.
