= List of Danish composers =

The following is a list of notable Danish composers:

A B C D E F G H I J K L M N O P Q R S T U V W X Y Z

== A ==
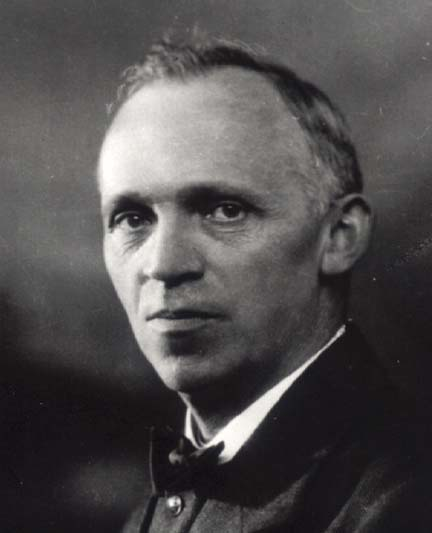
Thorvald Aagaard

- Thorvald Aagaard
- Truid Aagesen
- David Abell
- Hans Abrahamsen
- Aksel Agerby
- Harald Agersnap
- Georg Frederik Ferdinand Allen
- Robert William Otto Allen
- Arthur Ivan Allin
- Birgitte Alsted
- Herman Amberg
- Johan Amberg
- Aksel Andersen
- Benny Andersen
- Daniel Andersen
- Eyvin Andersen
- Hakon Andersen
- Joachim Andersen
- Johannes Andersen
- Fritz Andersen
- Kai Normann Andersen
- Sophus Andersen
- Lotte Anker

== B ==
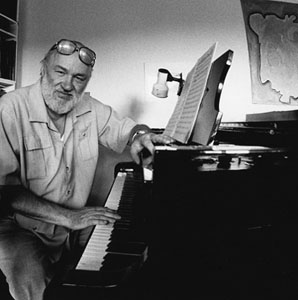
Niels Viggo Bentzon

- Erik Bach
- Kasper Bai
- Frans Bak
- Carl Christian Nicolaj Balle
- Harald Balslev
- Emilius Bangert
- Christian Barnekow
- Sigurd Barrett
- Christian Frederik Barth
- Frederik Philip Carl August Barth
- Wilhelm Herman Barth
- Johan Bartholdy
- Rudolph Bay
- Julius Bechgaard
- Victor Bendix
- Jørgen Bentzon
- Niels Viggo Bentzon
- Nicolai Berendt
- Gunnar Berg

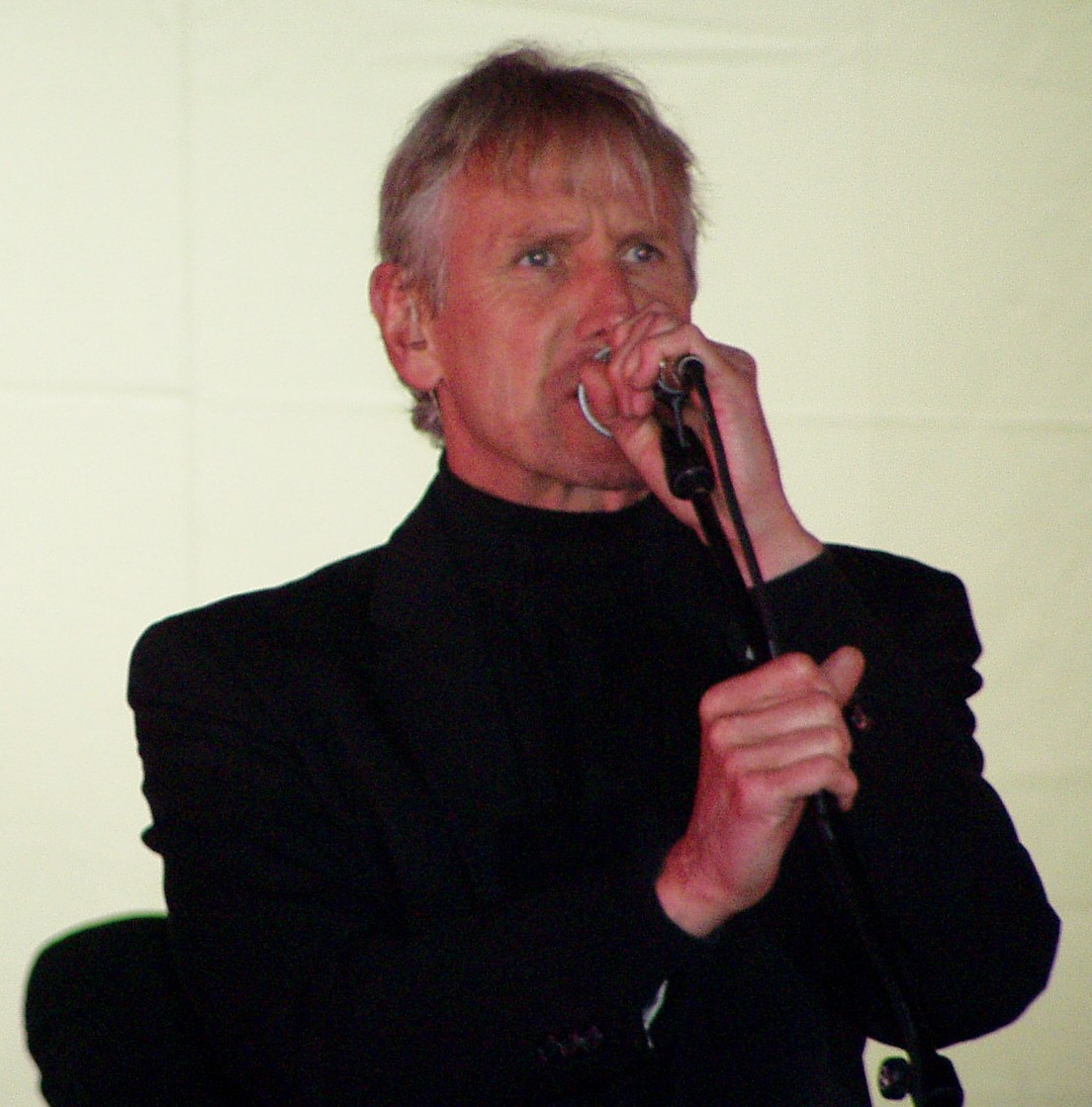
Steffen Brandt

- Andreas Peter Berggreen
- Ilja Bergh
- Rudolph Sophus Bergh
- Niels Bernhart
- Viggo Bielefeldt
- Ludvig Birkedal-Barfod
- Erling Bjerno
- Thomas Blachman
- Georg Carl Bohlmann
- Elisabeth Boisen
- Jørgen Ditleff Bondesen
- Helge Bonnén
- Melchior Borchgrevinck
- Kim Borg

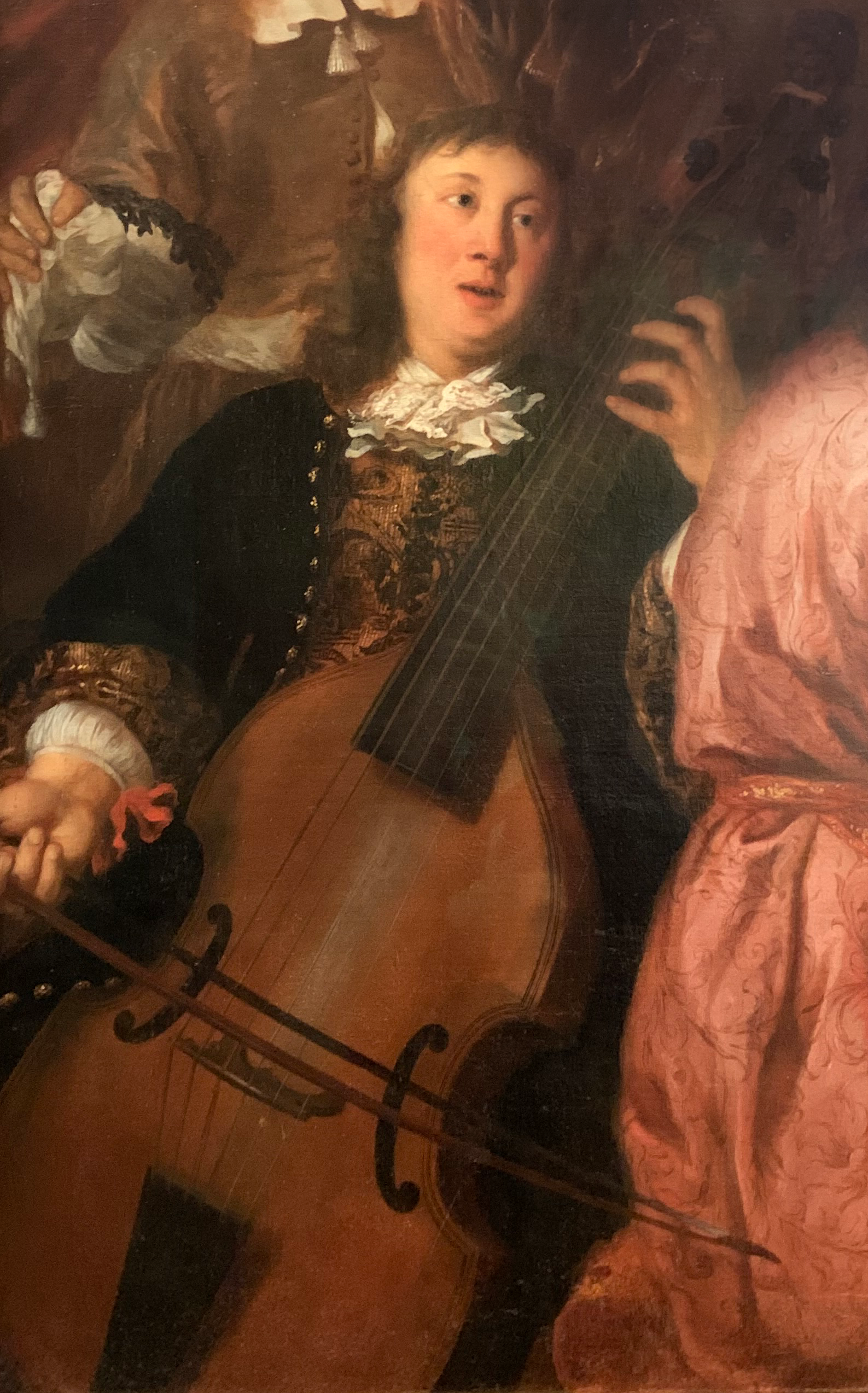
Dietrich Buxtehude

- Axel Borup-Jørgensen
- Hans Brachrogge
- Steffen Brandt
- Ivar Bredal
- Erling Brene
- Viggo Brodersen
- Nicolaus Bruhns
- Kai Aage Bruun
- Peter Bruun
- Ole Buck
- Michael Bundesen
- Carl Busch
- Volkmar Busch
- Dietrich Buxtehude
- Erik Bøgh
- Hakon Børresen

== C ==
- Camillo Carlsen
- Henrik Carlsen
- Bernhard Christensen
- Asger Lund Christiansen
- Henning Christiansen
- Karl Clausen
- Niels Clemmensen
- Carl Cohn Haste
- Victor Cornelius
- Fritz Crome
- Simoni Dall Croubelis

== D ==
- Balduin Dahl
- Nancy Dalberg
- Johan Darbes
- Christian Debois
- Søffren Degen
- Nathanael Diesel
- Jean Baptiste Édouard Du Puy
- Otto Dütsch

== E ==
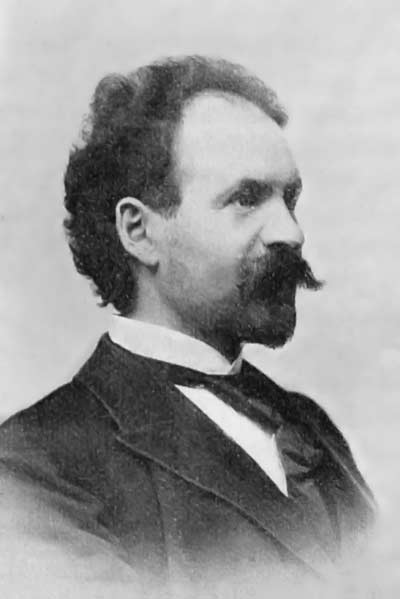
August Enna

- Adolph Julius Eggers
- Søren Nils Eichberg
- Niels Eje
- Henning Elbirk
- Ejnar Emborg
- Harald Bjerg Emborg
- Jens Laursøn Emborg
- Jørgen Emborg
- Aage Emborg
- August Enna
- Poul Allin Erichsen
- Morten Eskesen

== F ==
- Jacob Christian Fabricius
- Bent Fabricius-Bjerre

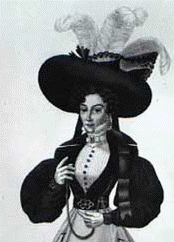
Ida Henriette da Fonseca

- Frederik Foersom
- Peter Christian Foersom
- Johan Foltmar
- Ida Henriette da Fonseca
- Julius Foss
- John Frandsen
- Axel Frederiksen
- Johan Henrik Freithoff
- Ivar Frounberg
- Carl Johan Frydensberg
- Johannes Frederik Frølich
- Frederik Christian Funck
- Peter Ferdinand Funck
- Fuzzy
- Johanne Fenger
- Carl Gottlob Füssel

== G ==
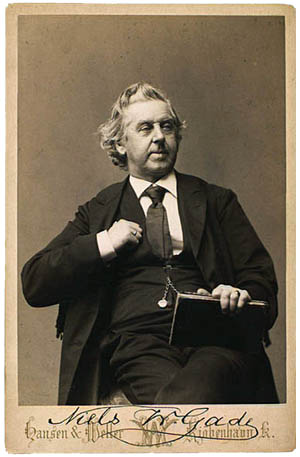
Niels W. Gade

- Ingolf Gabold
- Axel Gade
- Jacob Gade
- Niels W. Gade
- Johann Christian Gebauer
- Christian Geisler
- Christian Geist
- Carl Ludvig Gerlach
- Georg Gerson
- W.H.R.R. Giedde
- Lennart Ginman
- Nicolo Gistou
- Christian Henrik Glass
- Louis Glass

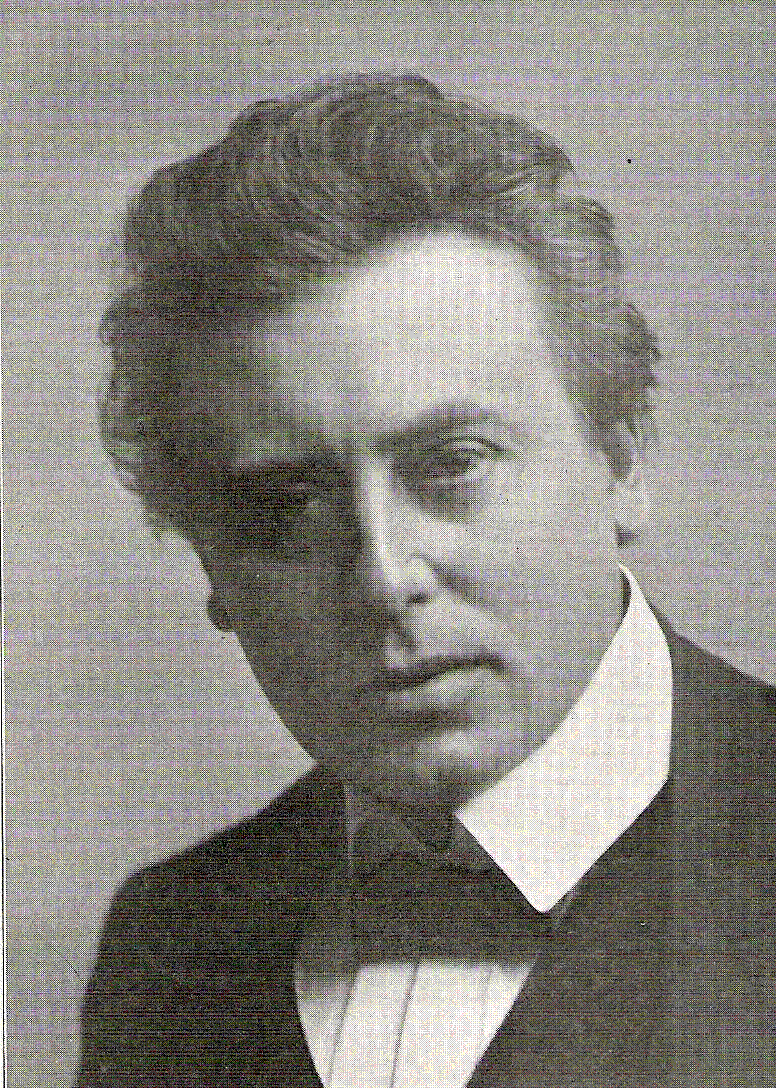
Louis Glass

- Franz Joseph Glæser
- Joseph Glæser
- Peder Gram
- Axel Grandjean
- Lars Graugaard
- Tekla Griebel-Wandall
- Michael Ehregott Grose
- Heinrich Ernst Grosmann
- Jacob Groth
- Georg Grothe
- Launy Grøndahl
- Peter Grønland
- Pelle Gudmundsen-Holmgreen
- Bo Gunge
- Cornelius Gurlitt
- Hugo Gyldmark
- Sven Gyldmark
- Birger Wøllner Gaarn

== H ==
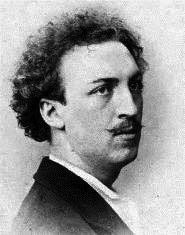
Asger Hamerik

- Sophus Hagen
- Mads Hak
- Andreas Hallager
- Sophus Halle
- Povl Hamburger
- Asger Hamerik
- Ebbe Hamerik
- Margaret Hamerik
- Jodle Birge
- Christian Julius Hansen
- Frants Johannes Hansen
- Nicolaj Hansen
- Robert Emil Hansen
- Thorvald Hansen
- Hans Hansen
- Egil Harder
- Knud Harder
- August Wilhelm Hartmann

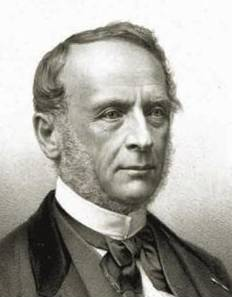
J.P.E. Hartmann

- Emil Hartmann
- Emma Hartmann
- J.P.E. Hartmann
- Johan Ernst Hartmann
- Johann Hartmann
- Lars Hegaard
- Anton Hegner
- Ludvig Hegner
- Jørgen Heide
- Peter Heise
- Paul Hellmuth
- Thomas Helmig
- Carl Helsted
- Edvard Helsted
- Gustav Helsted
- Edgar Henrichsen
- Roger Henrichsen
- Fini Henriques

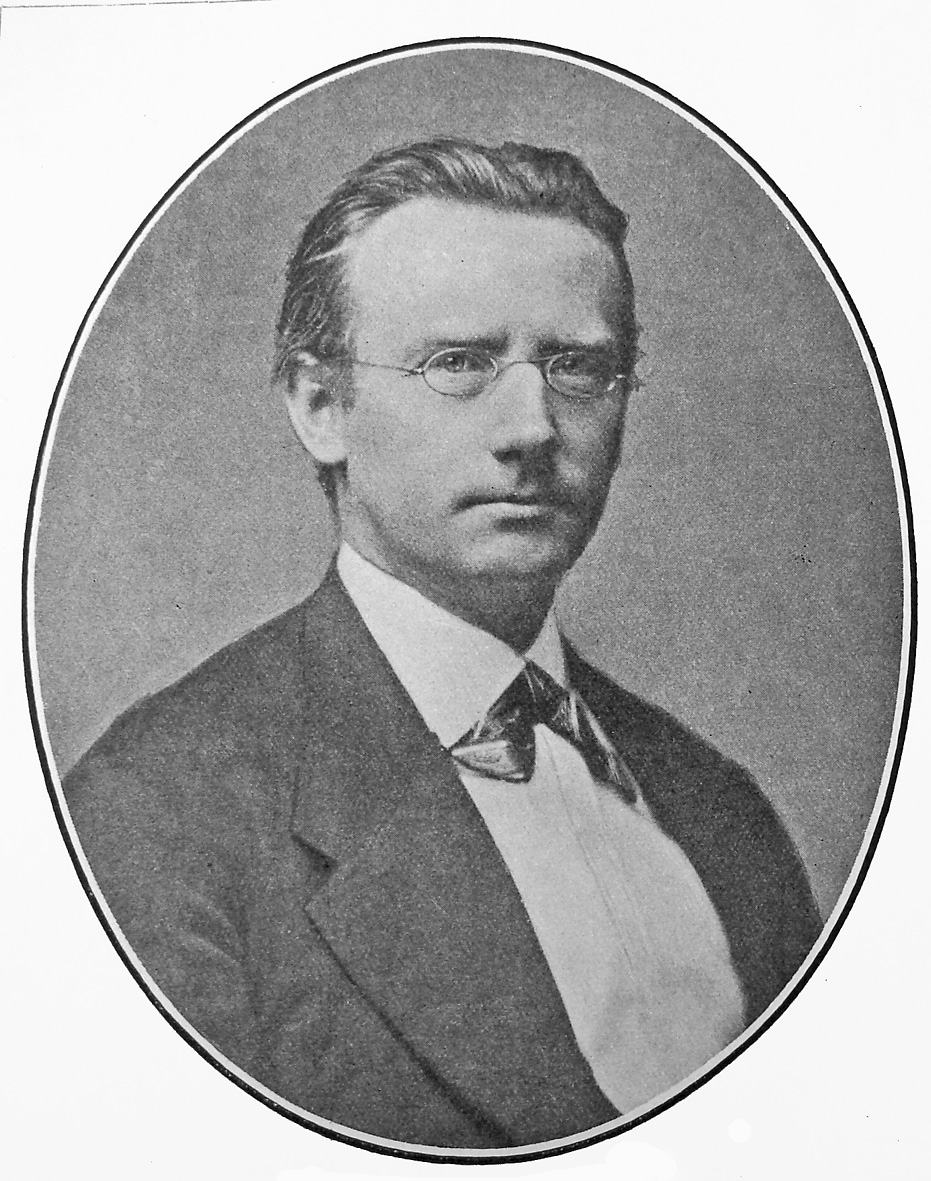
Peter Heise

- Bent Hesselmann
- Christian Hildebrandt
- Niels Peter Hillebrandt
- Bjørn Hjelmborg
- Ludvig Holm
- Mogens Winkel Holm
- Vilhelm Christian Holm
- Vagn Holmboe
- Bo Holten
- C.F.E. Horneman
- Emil Horneman
- Bjarne Hoyer
- Johan Hye-Knudsen
- Otto Hænning
- Georg Høeberg
- Finn Høffding

== I ==
- Johannes Erasmus Iversen

== J ==
- Ejnar Jacobsen
- Jens Bjerre Jacobsen
- Niels Peter Jensen
- Knud Jeppesen
- Jørgen Jersild
- Axel Jørgensen
- C.V. Jørgensen

== K ==
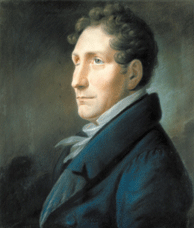
Friedrich Kuhlau

- Leif Kayser
- Axel Kjerulf
- Charles Kjerulf
- Povl Kjøller
- Paul von Klenau
- Werner Knudsen
- Jesper Koch
- Anders Koppel
- Herman D. Koppel
- Thomas Koppel
- Søren Kragh-Jacobsen
- Peter Casper Krossing
- Hans Ernst Krøyer
- Friedrich Kuhlau
- F.L.Æ. Kunzen
- Jesper Kyd
- Morten Kærså

== L ==
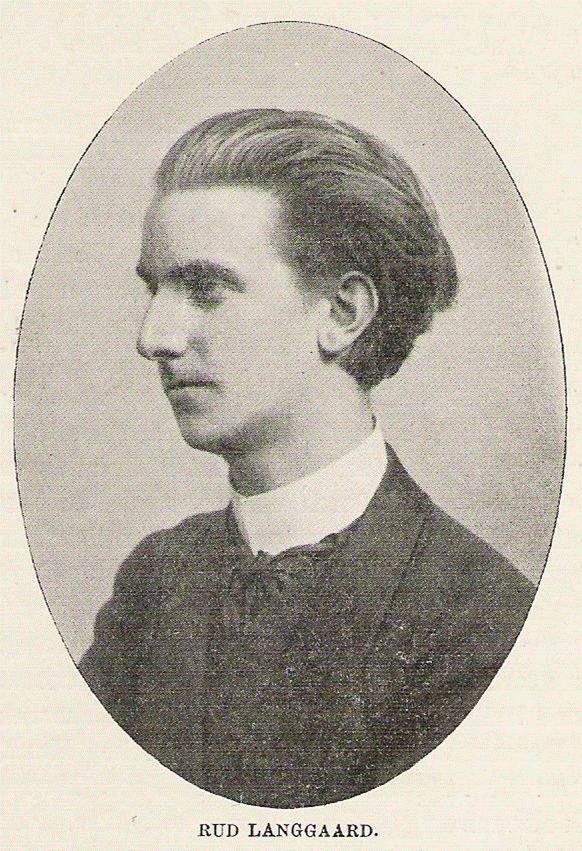
Rued Langgaard

- Niels la Cour
- Peter Erasmus Lange-Müller
- Rued Langgaard
- Kim Larsen
- Søren Sebber Larsen
- Thomas Laub
- Bernhard Lewkovitch
- Axel Liebmann
- Nanna Liebmann
- Lars Lilholt
- Anne Linnet
- Martin Lohse
- Bent Lorentzen
- Jakob Lorentzen
- Hans Christian Lumbye
- Tom Lundén

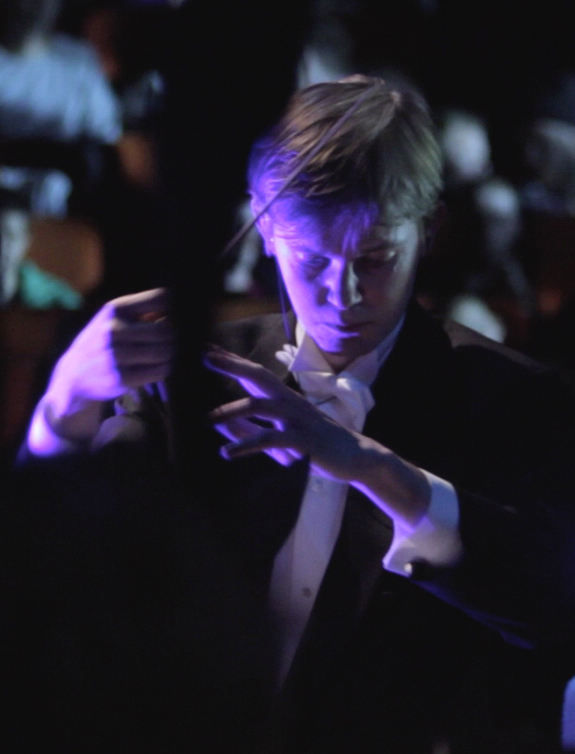
Frederik Magle

- Frederikke Løvenskiold

== M ==
- Frederik Magle
- Otto Malling
- Marilyn Mazur
- Carl Viggo Meincke
- Sextus Miskow
- Benna Moe
- John Mogensen
- Otto Mortensen
- Erik Moseholm

== N ==
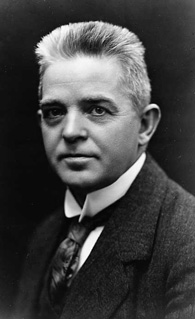
Carl Nielsen

- Joachim Neergaard
- Franz Xaver Neruda
- Ulrik Neumann
- Andreas P. Nielsen
- Carl Nielsen
- Ludolf Nielsen
- Erik Norby
- Heinrich von Nutzhorn
- Cora Nyegaard
- Per Nørgård
- Ib Nørholm

== O ==
- Morten Olsen

== P ==
- Else Marie Pade
- Steen Pade
- Andy Pape
- Holger Simon Paulli
- Gunner Møller Pedersen
- Ivan Pedersen
- Mogens Pedersøn
- James Price

== R ==
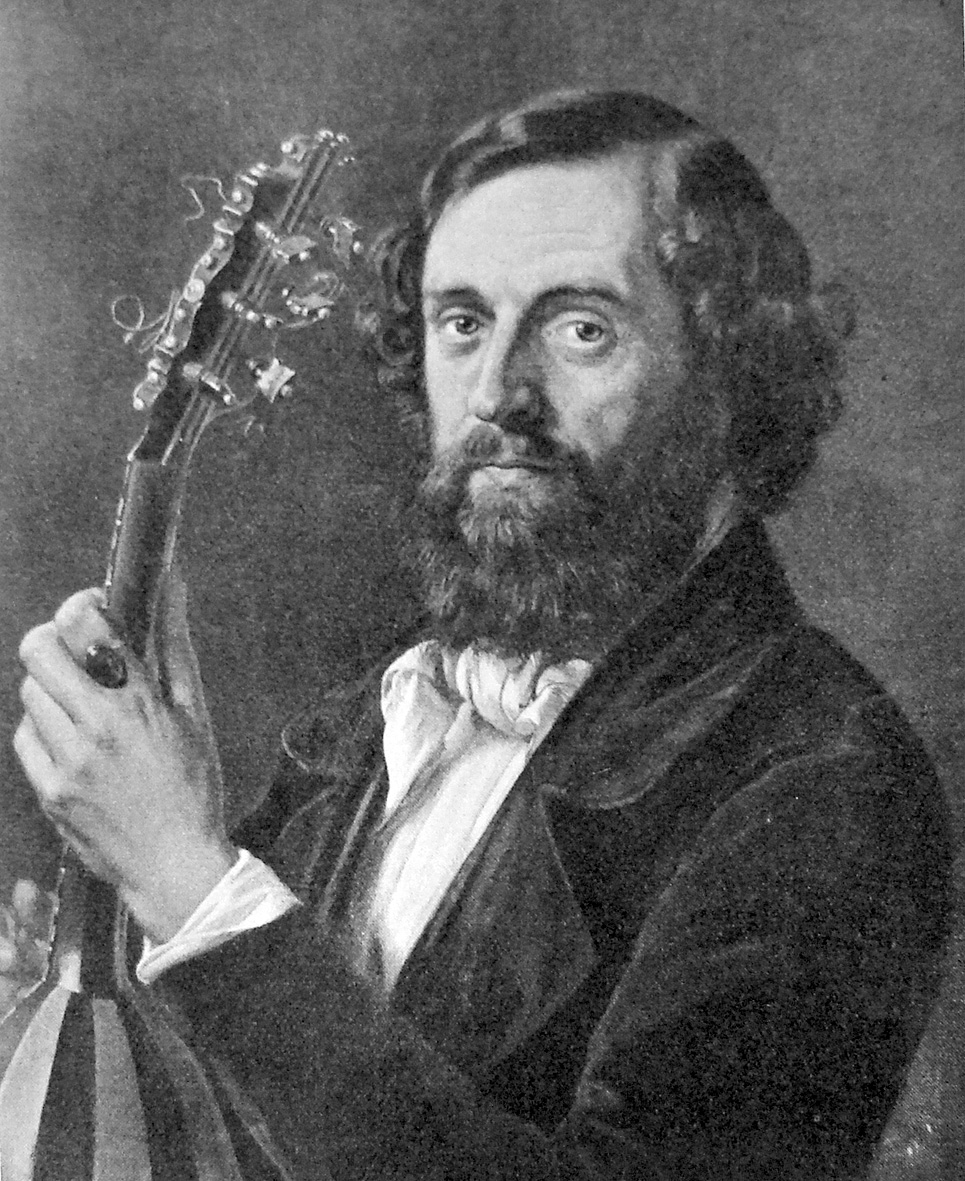
Henrik Rung

- Christian Joseph Rasmussen
- Karl Aage Rasmussen
- Emil Reesen
- Jascha Richter
- Knudåge Riisager
- Oluf Ring
- Kjell Roikjer
- Leopold Rosenfeld
- Poul Ruders
- Frederik Rung
- Henrik Rung
- P. S. Rung-Keller
- Hanne Rømer

== S ==
- Thomas Sandberg
- Sanne Salomonsen
- Claus Schall
- Peder Schall
- Johann Adolph Scheibe
- Poul Schierbeck
- Poul Christian Schindler
- Svend S. Schultz
- Ludvig Schytte
- Sebastian
- Rudolph Simonsen
- Svenn Skipper
- Niels Skousen
- Kira Skov
- Bent Sørensen
- Aage Stentoft
- Bo Stief
- Henrik Strube

== T ==
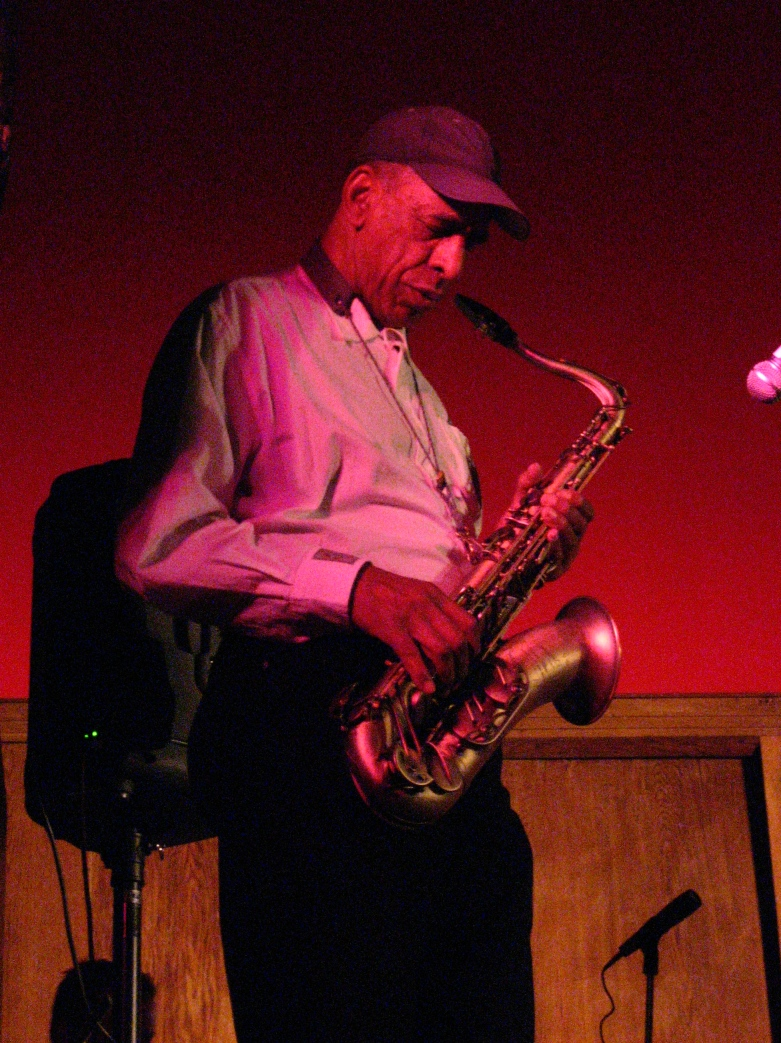
John Tchicai

- John Tchicai
- Michael Teschl
- Carl August Thielo
- Knud Vad Thomsen
- Kenneth Thordal
- Peter Thorup
- Leif Thybo

== V ==
- Karsten Vogel
- Herman Friedrich Voltmar
- Johan Voltmar

== W ==
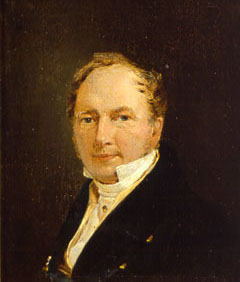
C. E. F. Weyse

- Flemming Weis
- Tue West
- Svend Westergaard
- C. E. F. Weyse
- Henriette Wienecke
- K.A. Wieth-Knudsen
- August Winding

== Z ==
- Hardenack Otto Conrad Zinck
