= Funck =

Funck is a surname of Germanic origin.

Notable people with this last name include:

- David Funck
- Emma Maddox Funck (1853–1940), American suffragist
- Eva Funck (born 1956), Swedish TV host
- Frantz Funck-Brentano (1862–1947), Luxembourgish-French historian; son of Théodore Funck-Brentano
- Frederik Christian Funck (1783–1866), Danish cellist and composer
- Hans Funck
- Hans von Funck (1891–1979), German army general during World War II
- Hasse Funck
- Heinrich Christian Funck (1771–1839), German pharmacist and bryologist
- Heinrich Funck
- Johann Funck
- Josiah Funck, the namesake of the historic Josiah Funck Mansion
- Magdalena Rosina Funck
- Peter Ferdinand Funck (1788–1859), Danish violinist and composer
- Théophile Funck-Brentano (1830–1906), Luxembourgish-French sociologist; father of Frantz Funck-Brentano
- Thomas Funck (1919–2010), Swedish nobleman, author, and radio personality
- Werner Funck
