= Ejnar Emborg =

Danish composer

Ejnar Emborg (1888–1963) was a Danish composer and music teacher. Son of Lavrs Rasmussen and Hansine Jensen and brother to Jens Laursøn Emborg and Age Emborg he became teacher for Vordingborg Seminarium. Afterward he would sing and teach for Horsens Kvindeseminarium

== See also ==
- List of Danish composers
