= Adolph Julius Eggers =

Danish composer (1859–1919)

- Born: January 23, 1859; Copenhagen, Denmark
- Died: December 16, 1919 (aged 60); Copenhagen, Denmark
- Citizenship: Kingdom of Denmark
- Occupation(s): composer, organist, guitarist
- Years active: 1880–1919

Adolph Julius Eggers (23 January 1859 – 16 December 1919) was a Danish organist, guitarist and composer.

== Life and career ==
Eggers was an organ pupil of Peter Schram, Gottfred Matthison-Hansen, P. Rasmussen and A. Rüdinger.

In 1880 he became organ substitute in Trinity Church. In 1905 he was cantor at Sankt Matthæus Church in Copenhagen, where he succeeded Johan Bartholdy, and in 1910 at Holmens Church, where he succeeded Viggo Bielefeldt. In 1904 he received the Ancker Scholarship and traveled to Germany, Switzerland and Italy on a study trip.

During his lifetime, he performed some larger compositions for choir or orchestra, but he is remembered today above all for a large number of publications for one and two guitars. These are arrangements of other composers' music or accompaniment to songs.

== Works ==
List of musical works from Eggers:

- Suite pastorale (orchestra)
- up. 5 Train of Dionysus (orchestra)
- Kong Volmer (orchestra, including choir and tenor)
- up. 7 Serenade (wind quintet and harp)
- up. 8 Music for the Play Inez of Coimbra (based on Portuguese folk tunes)
- Hubertusfesten (ballet)
- 12 Spanish Dances and Melodies (guitar and mandolin)
- Selected Compositions (guitar)
- Fingal (tragic song drama)
- Kinfo (operetta)
- Les Cloches de Copenhague (among other things for concert band)

== See also ==
- List of Danish composers
