= Christian Rasmussen =

Christian Rasmussen may refer to:

- Christian Rasmussen (racing driver) (born 2000), Danish race car driver
- Christian Rasmussen (footballer) (born 2003), Danish footballer
- Christian Joseph Rasmussen (1845–1908), Danish composer
