= Karl Clausen =

Danish musician

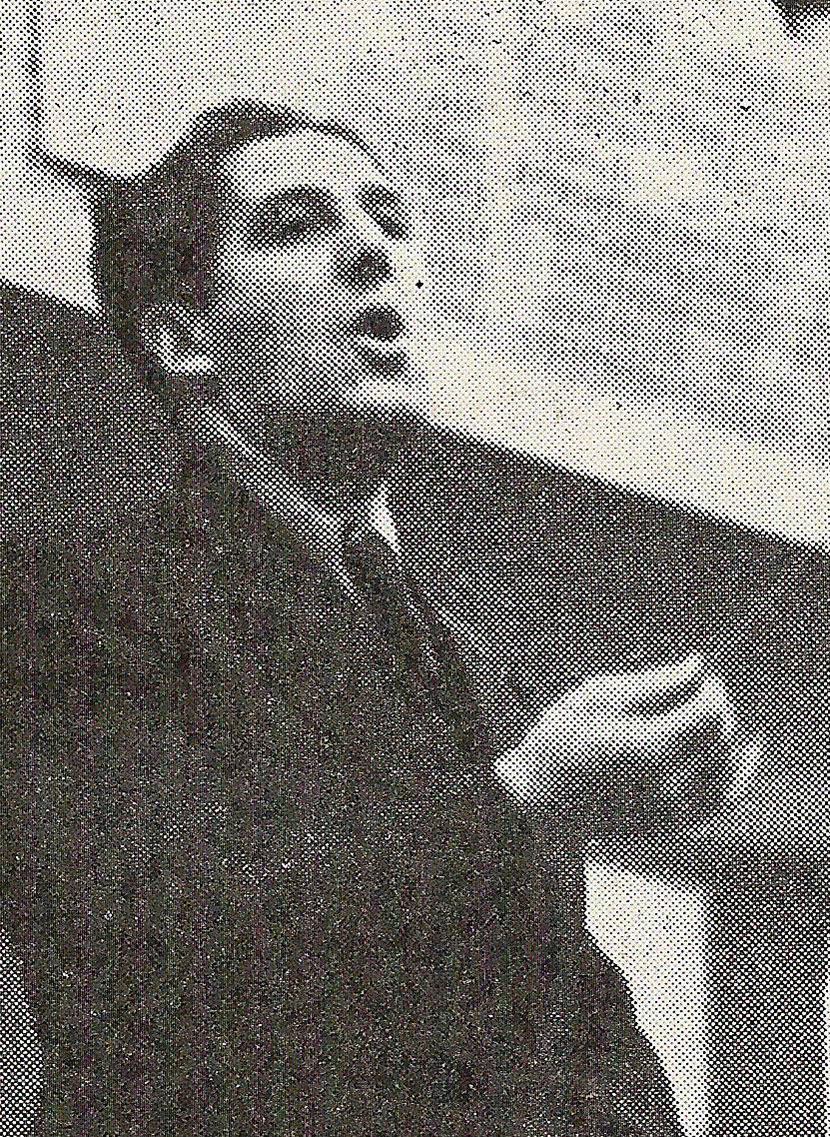
Karl Clausen as choir conductor.

Karl Søren Clausen (15 August 1904 – 5 December 1972) was a Danish pianist, conductor, composer and musicologist. In addition to his work as a high school teacher in German and Music, he composed several instrumental and choral works, as well as songs. He became increasingly involved in work with amateur choirs and school singing, and he became a very popular choir conductor, who led several choirs to many musical successes, often with his own choir arrangements, based on folk melodies.

The strong folk singing tradition that he experienced in his childhood Sønderjylland under German rule became decisively influential during his later career. In the late 1940s he began collecting sound recordings of folk singing in marginal, rural areas of Jylland, and in the 1960s he continued this work in the isolated Faroe Islands in the North Atlantic. Alongside teaching and collection work, Clausen also began studying the history of Danish and North German folk singing, and put folk singing into a new context, incorporating historical, religious and sociological aspects, as reflected in various articles, as well as a textbook.

== Life ==
Clausen grew up in a teacher's family in Aabenraa in North Schleswig, an area which Denmark had ceded to Prussia, following the defeat in the Second Schleswig War in 1864. Although forming a majority of the population, the Danes here faced critical times, being under strong influence of German administration, culture and language. Danish culture and language were, however, kept alive, not least through the growth of a quite strong folk singing culture. Clausen went to German secondary school, but in 1923 when he graduated from high school, the 1920 referendum following the German defeat in World War I had given North Schleswig back to Denmark. The mixed Danish-German culture of his childhood would be an inspiration for Clausen's work for much of his life, starting with a small autobiographical pamphlet with descriptions of his school days.

As a young, talented pianist, he studied piano with Roger Henrichsen. In 1928, he took an MA degree from the University of Copenhagen, with German as major and Music and later Danish as minors. He worked as a high school teacher, first at Rungsted Statsskole 1928-35 and then at Østre Borgerdyd Gymnasium 1935–63, but also for some years at Metropolitanskolen, from 1946 as senior master. Along with teaching, he studied music theory with Hakon Andersen, and was music teacher and choir conductor at Danmarks Lærerhøjskole 1941–63.

In 1936 he was appointed technical inspector at the musical night school of the City of Copenhagen, and during the following years under his leadership choir singing experienced a significant lift in both quality and diversity. He conducted the male choir Bel Canto and Københavns Lærerkor and was head conductor of Danske Læreres Sangkor. His teaching was an inspiration for many and contributed a lot to the music subject, which until around 1940 was only available as a minor degree in Denmark. His choir performances began to be radio broadcast, and he also began a long series of radio programmes about songs and folk singing, which gradually led him to take up musicological research in folk singing on a larger scale. In 1948 he wrote an article about Danish folk singing for the musicological magnum opus Om Musik II, and in 1958 came his comprehensive textbook on the subject, which was reprinted 1975. The book contained a wealth of new information and new perspectives on the interplay between historical events, social conditions and folk singing. Clausen's great idea, of the folk song performed by the everyday person, who likes and needs the song as a means of expression, became with him a study subject of deeper culture-historical perspectives than seen before.

In 1963, he gave up high school teaching and accepted a position as lecturer with the Musicological Department at Aarhus University, where he led the archive Sanghistorisk Arkiv. During his first years in Aarhus, he carried out song collections in South and West Jylland, but his last years were more and more focused on Faroese folk singing. He went on several collection trips to the islands, where he primarily focused on the hitherto rather obscure religious kingo-singing and spiritual singing, of which he collected several hundred recordings.

== Composer ==
As a composer, Clausen was inspired by the New Objectivity of the 1920s, as reflected in his school opera Klokken (The Bell) from 1934, based on the Hans Christian Andersen fairy tale, as well as Tema med Variationer for orchestra from 1936. In 1938, he received a scholarship, Det anckerske Legat, and spent the following year in Paris, where he studied composition with Darius Milhaud, which resulted in a wind quintet 1939 and a flute concert 1940.

=== Compositions ===
- Klokken (1934) (school opera)
- Tema med Variationer (1936) (for orchestra)
- Vor sol er bleven kold (1937?) (song with lyrics by Johannes V. Jensen)
- Blæserkvintet (1939) (wind quintet)
- Fløjtekoncert (1940) (flute concert)
- De mørke fugle fløj (1943) (song with lyrics by Otto Gelsted)

== Musicologist ==
Karl Clausen's main achievement was his musicological work with song history. He established a large collection of song books, Karl Clausens sanghistoriske Samling, consisting of close to 10,000 volumes and today located at the University of Southern Denmark in Odense. In the 1950s and 60s, he made extensive collections on tape recorder of folk singing in south and west Jutland. Many of these recordings are available online. Based on the recordings, he made a series of radio broadcasts, and published several articles about folk singing, as well as his principal work Dansk folkesang gennem 150 år, from 1958.

During his years at Rungsted Statsskole, Karl Clausen had Faroese students, who introduced him to their folk singing, which was still thriving, because the modernist outlook and technology of post World War II Europe was only slowly being introduced in these remote islands. During the 1950s he took several choirs on tours to the Faroe Islands, where he quickly became a very popular choir conductor and got to know several of the islands' important folk singers. He was fascinated by the vigorous folk singing tradition of the Faroese, and 1967-72 went on several collection trips to the islands, where he collected several hundred examples of religious spiritual singing and Kingo-singing. With his openminded and unselfish character he got many Faroese friends during these trips, and also came to appreciate the somewhat impulsive and improvised outlook of the Faroese in those days, a behavior also brought about by the violent and awesome nature of the islands.

After his death, his daughter Marianne Clausen (1947–2014) continued his work: in 1975 she published the volume Åndelig visesang på Færøerne, and in 2006, as part of her five-volume magnum opus on Faroese folk singing, the volume Andlig Vísuløg í Føroyum / Spiritual Songs in the Faroes, with music transcriptions of more than 200 of her father's recordings.

== Publications ==
=== Choral and instrumental arrangements ===
- Arthur Arnholtz, Karl Clausen and Finn Viderø (eds.) (1947): Festsange. Engstrøm & Sødring Musikforlag, 240 pages (choral arrangements of 96 songs, including 43 by Clausen)
- Karl Clausen (1961): Tre små kantater over nordiske kærlighedsviser, ed. Harald Bjerg Emborg, Wilhelm Hansen, 10 pages
- Karl Clausen (1961): Folkelig Brorson-sang – 20 folkemelodier until Troens rare Klenodie og Svanesang, Wilhelm Hansen, 43 pages
- Karl Clausen (1961): Two small ouvertures for 3 Violins, Wilhelm Hansen, 7 pages
- Karl Clausen (published posthumous 1974): Engelske og franske folkesange udsat for solo og kor med klaver, Wilhelm Hansen, 39 pages

=== Articles and books ===
- Karl Clausen (1942): Omkring Henrik Rungs færøske folkevisemelodier (1846), pp. 155–172 in: Gunnar Heerup (ed.): levende musik, 1:8, October 1942, Aschehoug dansk Forlag
- Karl Clausen (1948): Folkelig sang i Danmark, pp. 130–181 in: Om musik II
- Karl Clausen (1958): Dansk folkesang gennem 150 år, Statsradiofoniens Grundbøger, Fremad, 338 pages
- Karl Clausen and Povl Fledelius (1960): Dichtung und Musik – Volkslieder und Poesie des Hainbundes, Gyldendal, 71 pages
- Kai Otto Andersen, Karl Clausen and Jørgen Haahr (eds.) (1962): Fællessang på fremmede sprog, 264 songs with melodies, Wilhelm Hansen
- Karl Clausen (1964): Sind og liv bag sangbogen, pp. 132–141 in: Af landsbyskolens saga, Universitetsforlaget i Århus, Danmarks Lærerforening, 247 pages
- Karl Clausen (1967): Den blå sangbog – i hundredåret for dens fremkomst, Udgivet af Sprogforeningen, Aabenraa, 59 pages
- Karl Clausen (1967): Den unge Niels W. Gade, festive lecture at Århus University, 22. Feb. 1967, printed as Danmarks Sanglærerforenings publikation nr. 17, 12 pages
- Karl Clausen (1968): Folkevise og nymodens sang i Napoleonstiden, Vol. 1: Introduktion. Sangens kår i et slesvigsk sogn, Akademisk Forlag, 131 pages
- Karl Clausen (1970: Es können passieren ... Es sind vorzuenthalten ... Zensur deutscher und dänischer Lieder in Tondern 1830–1847, pp. 14–56 in: Rolf Wilh. Brednich (ed.): Jahrbuch für Volksliedforschung, Erich Schmidt Verlag, Berlin
- Karl Clausen (1970): Der Kaiser ist ein lieber Mann ... Dansken har sejer vundet, hurra, hurra..., Aabenraa Statsskoles Samfund Aarsskrift 1970, 8 pages
- Karl Clausen (1970): Sangen mellem krigene og dens forudsætninger i 1840’erne – et bidrag until folke- og skolesangens historie i Slesvig, pp. 23–66 i: Årbog for dansk Skolehistorie 1970
- Karl Clausen (1972): Wirkungen von J.A.P. Schulz im Häuslichen und Volkstümlichen Musikleben Dänemarks, Nerthus III, Nordisch-deutsche Beiträge, Eugen Diederichs Verlag, pp. 263–294
- Karl Clausen (1972): Dansk-tysk naboskab i sangen i det slesvigske, pp. 135–144 in: Årbog for Dansk Etnologi og Folkemindevidenskab 1973, transcript by Peter Ottoson of lecture given in 1972 at 19. Nordiske Etnolog- og Folkemindeforskermøde in Sønderborg
- Karl Clausen (1972): Mädchen, hör' was ich tu fragen, 7 pages
- Karl Clausen og Marianne Clausen (1975): Åndelig Visesang på Færøerne, in: Fra Færøerne : Úr Føroyum, vol. VII-VIII, Dansk-Færøsk Samfund, 203 pages
