= Axel Kjerulf =

Danish composer (1884–1964)

Axel Kjerulf (July 24, 1884 – September 19, 1964) was a Danish composer, author, journalist, and music theorist. He was the son of music critic Charles Kjerulf.

== See also ==
- List of Danish composers
