= Gustav Helsted =

Danish organist and composer

Gustav Carl Helsted
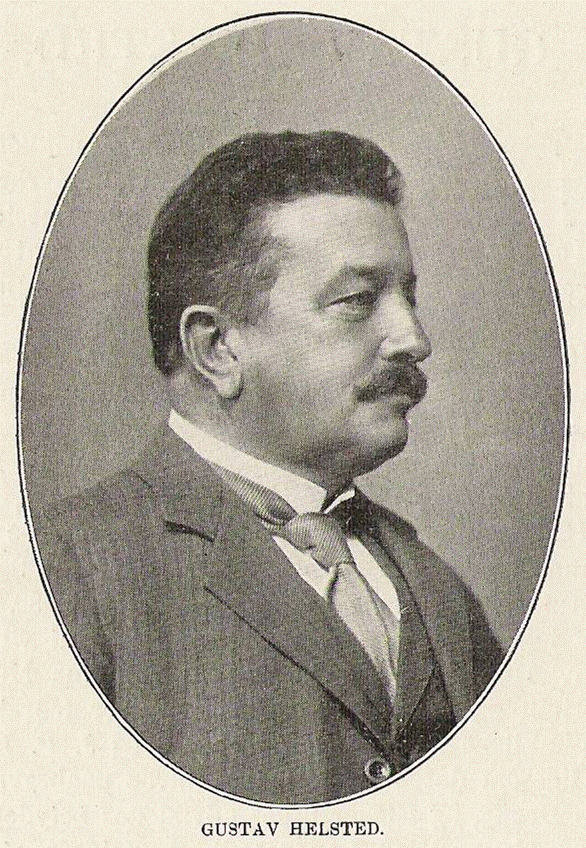
- Born: 30 January 1857
- Died: 1 March 1924 (aged 67)
- Occupation: Composer

Gustav Carl Helsted (30 January 1857 - 1 March 1924) was a Danish organist and composer.

Helsted was the son of composer Carl Helsted, brother of painter Viggo Helsted, and nephew of composer Edvard Helsted. He was a student of Gottfred Matthison-Hansen.

Helsted was the first organist of the Jesus Church in Copenhagen. He was paid 600 Danish crowns a year for the position. He was also the music director of the Danish Musical Society.

== Notable works ==
- Overture in C minor (piano four hands 1875)
- Scherzo in C♯ minor (for 2 pianos/eight hands 1880)
- String quartet in B minor (1881)
- op. 1 Erotiske Sangtekster (voice and piano, 1883)
- op. 2 Symphony no. 1 in D minor (1883)
- op. 3 String quartet no. 1 in D minor (1884)
- Romance in G major (violin and piano 1884)
- Romance in A major (violin and piano 1885)
- op. 4 En Kærlighedshistorie (piano 1886)
- op. 5 Paa Fodtur en Sommerdag (suite for orchestra 1885)
- op. 6 piano trio in E minor (1886)
- op. 7 Six songs (1886)
- op. 8 Violin concerto in C major (1887)
- op. 9 En Bryllupsfest (orchestral suite 1887)
- op. 10 Suite no. 2 in A major (orchestra 1887)
- op. 11 Romance for violin and orchestra in G major (1888)
- op. 12 Fem sange (1889)
- op. 13 Sonata in A major (violin and piano 1889)
- op. 14 Fem Fantasistykker (piano 1889)
- op. 15 Gurresange (soloists, chorus and orchestra 1889)
- op. 16 Fantasy sonata in E minor (organ, 1890)
- Sørgemarch in C minor - In memoriam Niels W. Gade (orchestra 1891)
- op. 17 Trio in C major (violin, viola and cello 1891)
- op. 18 Decet in D major (wind quintet, string quartet and contrabass, 1891)
- op. 19 String quartet no. 2 in C minor (1891)
- op. 20 Sonata no. 2 in G major (violin and piano 1892)
- op. 21 String quintet in E major (1895)
- op. 22 Symphony no. 2 in E major (1886)
- op. 23 Sange af J.P. Jacobsen (1896)
- op. 24 String quartet no. 3 in F major (1898)
- op. 25 Abels Død (Abel's Death) (voices, choir and orchestra 1895/1912)
- op. 26 String sextet in E major (1892/1907)
- Præludium in A major (organ 1900)
- op. 27 Violin concerto no. 2 in B minor (1900/1909)
- op. 28 Dansemusik (female choir and firhændig piano 1905)
- op. 29 Organ sonata in D major (1906)
- op. 30 Vort land (voices, choir and orchestra 1907)
- op. 31 Stormklokken (opera 1900/1911)
- Romance in G major (cello and piano 1907)
- 24 songs (1899–1907)
- Romance in F major (violin and piano 1909)
- Præludium in G major (organ 1915)
- Suite for String Orchestra (1919)
- Gud Helligaand! opfyld - (choir 1920)
- Sne (Snow) (choir and orchestra 1921)
- op. 32 Sommer in Gurre (Holger Drachmann)
- op. 33 String quartet in F minor (1922)
- op. 35 Cello concerto in C major
- Marche funèbre (organ, for the funeral of P. S. Kröyers)

== See also ==
- List of Danish composers
