= Hænning =

Hænning is a Danish surname. Notable people with the surname include:

- Gitte Hænning (born 1946), a Danish actress
- Otto Hænning (1916–2004), a Danish musician
