= Bohlmann =

Bohlmann is a German surname. Notable people with the surname include:

- Frank Bohlmann (1917–1999), American footballer
- Georg Bohlmann (1869–1928), German mathematician who specialized in probability theory and actuarial mathematics.
- Georg Carl Bohlmann (1838–1920), Danish composer and organist
- Hans-Joachim Bohlmann (1937–2009), German property vandal
- Ralph Arthur Bohlmann (1932–2016), American theologian
- Sabine Bohlmann (born 1969), German actress

== See also ==
- Theodor Bohlmann-Combrinck (1891–1956), German Wehrmacht general
- Philip Bohlman (born 1952), American ethnomusicologist
