= HAK =

HAK, Hak or hak may refer to:

== People ==
=== Surname ===
- Mads Hak (died 1555), Danish composer
- Miroslav Hák (1911–1978), Czech photographer
- Pavel Hak (born 1962), Czech-born French playwright and author
- Yvonne Hak (born 1986), Dutch middle-distance runner

=== Given name ===
- Hak (musician) (born 1994), American rapper and singer
- Hak Ja Han (born 1943), Korean religious leader

=== Others ===
- Henry Kissinger (born 1923), former US Secretary of State, whose initials HAK were routinely used by his senior staff in memos and disc
- The Sandman (wrestler) (born 1963), American wrestler who has used the ring name Hak

== Places ==
- Hak, Saskatchewan, Canada in the Rural Municipality of Swift Current
- Minkend, a Kurdish village in Azerbaijan, known as Hak (Հակ) in Armenian
- Haikou Meilan International Airport, in Haikou, Hainan, China

== Organizations ==
- Croatian Auto Club (Croatian: Hrvatski autoklub)
- Armenian National Congress (Armenian: Հայ Ազգային Կոնգրես, Hay Azgayin Kongres)
- Hunton Andrews Kurth, an American law firm

== Other uses ==
- Hak (mythology), an Ancient Egyptian deity
- Hamari Adhuri Kahani, a 2015 Bollywood film
- Harold & Kumar, a series of American comedy films
- Hakkai Chinese (ISO 639-3 alpha-3 code)

== See also ==
- Hack (disambiguation)
