= Frederik Christian Funck =

Danish musician

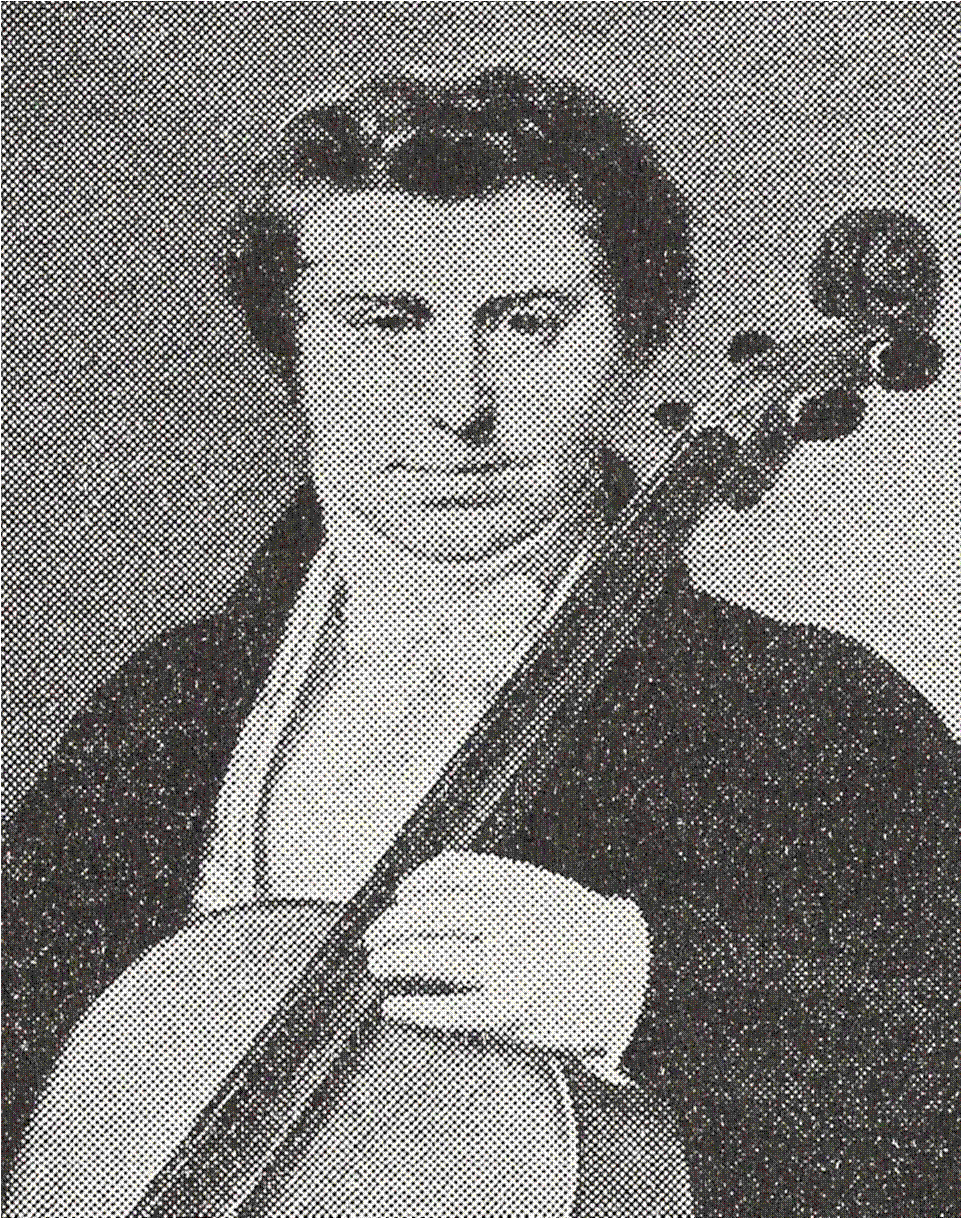

Frederik Christian Funck (30 August 1783 – 2 December 1866) was a Danish cellist and composer. He was the brother of Peter Ferdinand Funck and nephew of Claus and Peder Schall, all also musicians.

From the age of 10, Funck was taught by his maternal uncle Peder Schall, himself an accomplished cellist. On 20 January 1798, at the age of 14, he performed at a concert organised by the Danish Golden Age composer Christoph Ernst Friedrich Weyse. The following year he joined the Royal Danish Orchestra, which lays claim to being the world's oldest orchestra, having been in existence in some form since 1448. In 1815 he went on a concert tour of Russia, Finland and Sweden. In 1817, after his return to Denmark, he regularly performed in Copenhagen. The critics praised his virtuosity, beautiful clear tone and masterful playing; an 1821 review stated that "he has claimed his reputation as an excellent solo player both here in Sweden and in Russia, and even the Master Bernhard Romberg acknowledged him as such".

In 1822 he was given a royal stipend, and for the next 2 years and he performed as a soloist in places such as Berlin, Vienna, Munich and Paris. At his concert in Vienna in 1823, he performed one of his few compositions: Variationer for Violoncel med Kvartetakkompagnement. In 1831 he visited Norway and in 1849 he celebrated his 50th year as a member of the Royal Danish Orchestra. He remained a member until 1857, when he left at the age of 74, after 58 years. His final performance as a soloist was in 1852 at the Musikforeningen in Copenhagen, as it was coming into its prime as the leading concert venue in Denmark.

== See also ==
- List of Danish composers
