= K.A. Wieth-Knudsen =

Danish author, economist, and composer

Knud Asbjørn Wieth-Knudsen (January 8, 1878 - February 22, 1962) was a Danish author, economist, lawyer, and composer.

== See also ==
- List of Danish composers
