= Søren Sebber Larsen =

Danish composer

Søren Sebber Larsen (born 1966) is a Danish composer as well as an accomplished multi-instrumentalist, playing the guitar, keyboards drums. He released an album entitled "String Man" where he performs well-known classic songs from other artists on the guitar.

== See also ==
- List of Danish composers
