= Christian Geisler =

Danish organist and composer

Christian Peder Wilhelm Geisler (28 April 1869 – 19 August 1951) was a Danish organist and composer.

He graduated at the Conservatory of Music in the years 1887–1890 of, among others, Niels W. Gade, J.P.E. Hartmann and Gottfred Matthison-Hansen and studied 1895–96 with Max Bruch in Berlin. After his return, he acted as a composer, vocalist and organist. He was a teacher at the United Church Schools and Ingrid Jespersen School. From 1893 to 1911 he was employed as an organist at Reformed Church and from 1911 to 1939 at the church of Garnison.

He was a temporary with both Hartmann and Gade, who both embraced his musical attitude. His music is in the same style as theirs, and most of it was composed before the First World War. He composed in many genres.

== Notable works ==
- Arnes Sange, 3 Songs of Björnetjerne Björnsons Arne, Op. 1 (1889)
- Sonatine in G major for piano, Op. 2 (1897)
- String Quartet in B minor, Op. 3 (1893)
- Foraar (Spring), Poem Cycle for soprano and piano, Op. 4 (1910); words by Christian Richardt
- O, welch ein Tiefe for chorus, Op. 5 (1902)
- Julekantate for chorus, Op. 8a
- Ode til den menneskelige stemme for chorus, Op. 8b
- Under Egetræet for soloist, chorus and orchestra, Op. 9a (1890)
- Asminderød Kirkeklokken, Op. 9b (1915)
- Sonate for viola and piano, Op. 10 (1920)
- Minna, Tragic Overture for orchestra, Op. 11 (1895)
- Suite for orchestra, Op. 12 (1930)
- Et Morgensyn, Melodrama for speaker and orchestra, Op. 13 (1894); poem by Christian Molbech
- Zwei deutsche Gesänge (2 German Songs), Op. 14 (1900)
- Arier, Songs, Op. 16 (1888)
- Minneweise for chorus and soloists, Op. 18 (1890)
- Fem motetter (5 Motets) for chorus, Op. 19 (1920)
- String Quartet, Op. 30
- Festpræludium (Festival Prelude) for orchestra, Op. 32 (1945)
- Miniatursuite (Miniature Suite) for oboe and piano (1889)
- Kvartetter (Quartet) for chorus (1895)
- Skolehuset (Kantate ved indvielsen af Ingrid Jespersens skole) for chorus and piano (1895)
- Kantate ved indvielsen af K.F.U.M.s nye bygning for chorus and orchestra (1900)
- Forspil og fughetta (Prelude and Fughetta) for orchestra (1904)
- Hymne til Barnet (Hymn for Children) for voice and piano (1905)
- De profundis for string orchestra (1914)
- Hjortens Flugt, Opera (1920/30)

== See also ==
- List of Danish composers
