= Birger Wøllner Gaarn =

Danish organist, organ teacher and composer

Birger Wøllner Gaarn (3 August 1881 – 10 August 1949) was a Danish organist, organ teacher and composer. He graduated from the Royal Danish Academy of Music in 1902, and was the organist at Christian's Church, Copenhagen from 1907 to 1949.

== See also ==
- List of Danish composers
