= Ida Henriette da Fonseca =

Danish opera singer and composer (1802–1858)

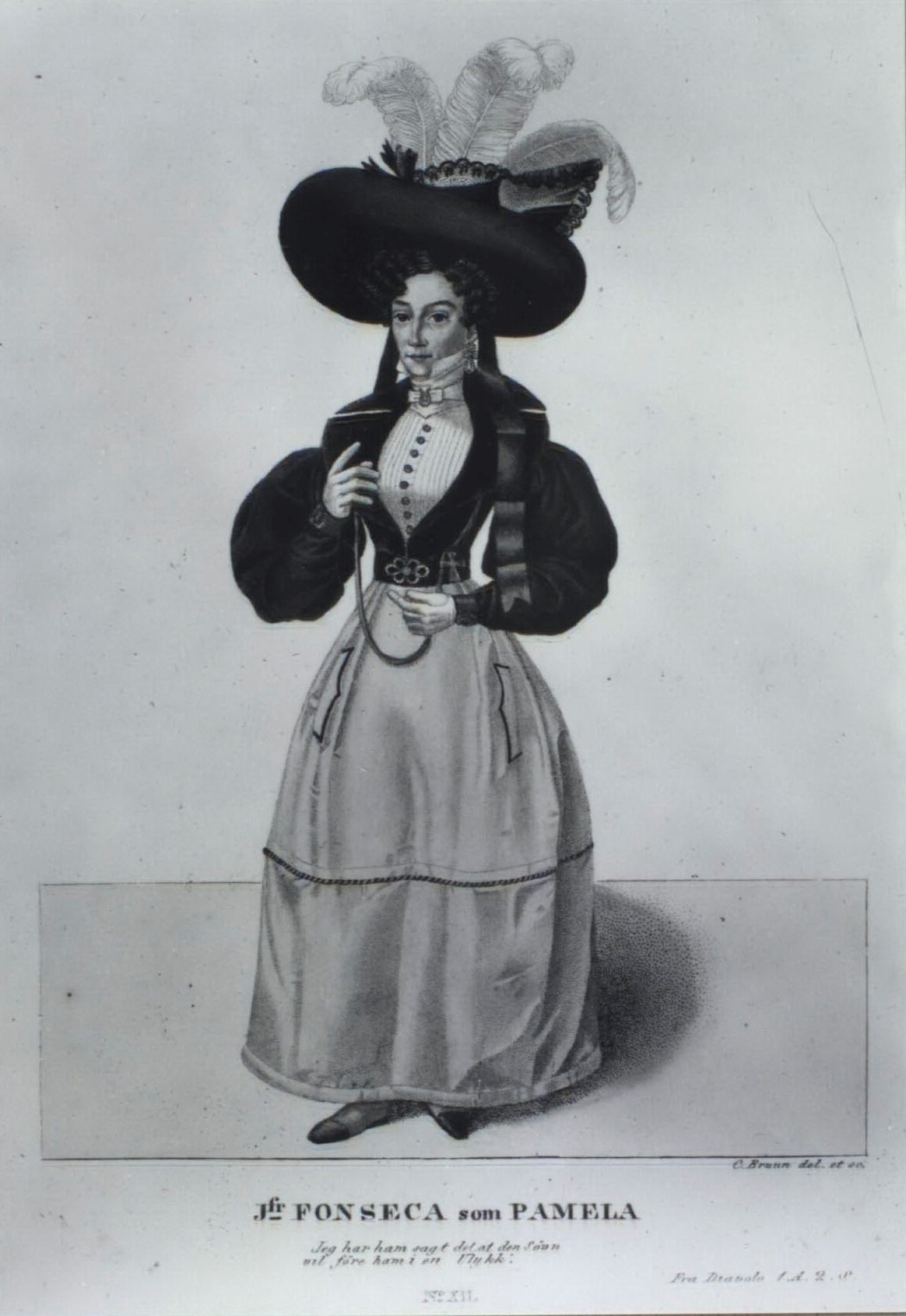
Ida da Fonseca as Pamela in Auber's opera Fra Diavolo

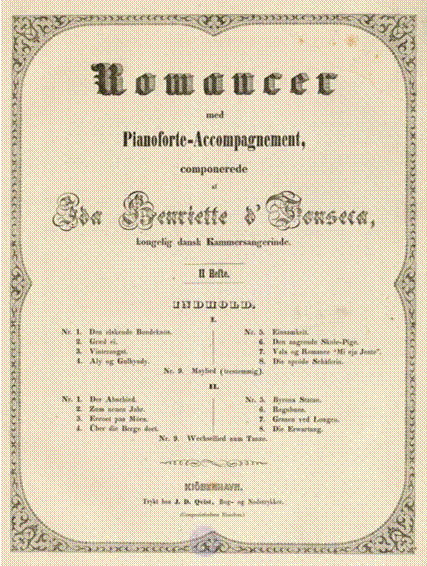
Title lead from one of Ida da Fonseca's publications.

Ida Henriette da Fonseca (27 July 1802 – 6 July 1858) was a Danish opera singer, voice teacher, and composer of Portuguese descent.

== Biography ==
Ida Henriette da Fonseca was the daughter of Portugal-born Abraham da Fonseca (1776–1849) and Marie Sofie Kiærskou (1784–1863). She and her sister Emilie da Fonseca were students of Giuseppe Siboni, choir master of the Opera in Copenhagen. She was given a place at the royal Opera alongside her sister the same year she debuted in 1827.

She made tours in Europe in 1829 and 1833–34, performing in Hannover, Germany, the Netherlands, and Sweden, after which she was named one of the greatest singers in Scandinavia and prima donna, but as she was not a soprano but an alto, which was not fashionable at the time, she was in fact not given many parts at the Danish opera. She often performed breeches roles. She retired in 1840.

In 1841, she was named royal court singer at her request, as it would make it easier to get students: she was suffering from economical difficulties and worked as a singing teacher. She performed at court the last time in 1842. She was popular as a concert singer, however, and much active as such. In 1844-47, she visited Sweden and Norway. In 1848, she published her first composition, and became one of the first woman composers of her country.

== See also ==
- List of Danish composers

== Sources ==
This article was initially translated from Ida Henriette da Fonseca on the Danish Wikipedia which lists the following sources:

- Dansk biografisk Leksikon 1. udgave
- Temaside på KB
- Kvindeleksikon
- Gerhard Schepelern: Giuseppe Siboni. Et Afsnit af Operaens Historie ude og hjemme. 1-2 København 1989
