= Frederik Foersom =

Danish musician

Frederik Foersom (June 13, 1805 – May 4, 1854) was a Danish composer and organist.

From 1843 to 1854, he was the organ teacher at Odense Cathedral School.

== Notable works ==
- Rind nu op i Jesu navn (1846)
- Rondolette (piano 1854)
- Jubel-Cantate (1840)
- Morgensang
- Reformations-Cantate
- Seiersmarsch (piano)
- Sørge-Cantate
- Syngeøvelser til Brug ved Sang-Undervisningen i Borger- og Almueskoler (1850)
- Din Skaal og min Skaal
- Rondo à la turca (piano)
- Variations sur un theme original (piano)

== See also ==
- List of Danish composers
