= Thomas Sandberg =

Danish composer

Thomas Sandberg (born November 2, 1967) is a Danish composer.

== See also ==
- List of Danish composers
