= Vilhelm Christian Holm =

Danish composer

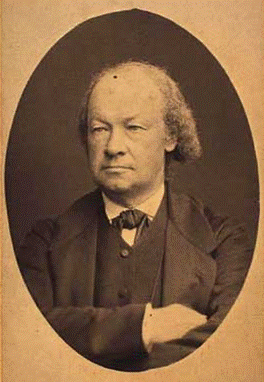

Vilhelm Christian Holm (28 September 1820 - 15 October 1886) was a Danish composer.

== Notable works ==
- La Ventana (1856)
- Fjernt fra Danmark (1860)
- Ponte molle (1866)
- Livjægerne paa Amager (1871)
- Et Æventyr i Billeder (1871)
- Mandarinens Døtre (1873)
- Weyses Minde (1874)
- Fra det forrige Aarhundrede (1875

== See also ==
- List of Danish composers
