= Sophus Hagen =

Danish composer

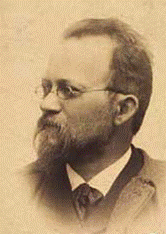
Sophus Hagen

Sophus Albert Emil Hagen (3 May 1842 – 3 April 1929) was a Danish composer and music historian. He also cofounded the Danish Music Museum.

== See also ==
- List of Danish composers
