= Werner Knudsen =

Danish computer scientist, composer, and author

Werner Knudsen (born 23 October 1953 in Ringsted) is a Danish computer scientist, composer and author of both choral music and IT books. He is an IT architect at IBM and used to work at TDC A/S. He lives in Glostrup close to Copenhagen.

Parallel to his IT career he has always worked with music, in particular choir singing. For a number of years he was chairman of the Children's choir of the Royal Danish Academy of Music for which he has arranged some music. He is also a member of Akademisk Kor, a Copenhagen-based oratorio choir.

He has primarily composed songs as well as choral and organ music, notably in collaboration with author Niels Johansen. Hvem kaldte på erantis?, a collection of their songs and hymns, was published at Unitas Forlag in 2010. His Sommersange, a choral cycle with lyrics by Thøger Larsen, has been published at Edition S in 2008.

== Works ==
IT Books

- 1995: Internet for alle
- 1997: Mere Internet for alle
- 1999: Internet tips for alle
- 2001: Den lille bog om søgning på nettet

Music Works:

- 2006: Sommersange (lyrics by Thøger Larsen)
- 2007: Du danske sommer, jeg elsker dig (lyrics by Thøger Larsen)
- 2010: Hvem kaldte på erantis? (lyrics by Niels Johansen)

== See also ==
- List of Danish composers
