= Axel Frederiksen =

Danish composer

Axel Frederiksen (1894–1951) was a Danish composer.

== See also ==
- List of Danish composers
