= Peter Christian Foersom =

Danish organist and composer

Peter Christian Foersom (28 January 1769 – 7 August 1856) was a Danish organist and composer. He was an organist at St. Knuds Church from 1790 to 1856.

From 1814 to 1843, he was the organ teacher at Odense Cathedral School.

== See also ==
- List of Danish composers
