= Heinrich von Nutzhorn =

Danish composer (1833–1925)

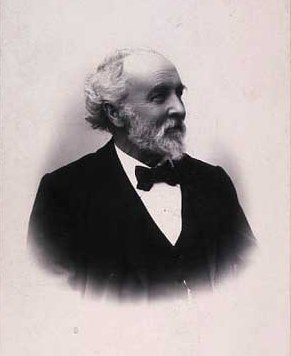
Portrait of Heinrich von Nutzhorn

Heinrich von Nutzhorn (February 20, 1833 – 1925) was a Danish composer.

His work included Danish Adventist hymns.

== See also ==
- List of Danish composers
