= Hugo Gyldmark =

Danish composer and conductor

Hugo Gyldmark (28 June 1899 - 7 September 1971) was a Danish composer and conductor.

He was a solo cellist and played with the National Scala.

Gyldmark played cello from a young age and his first engagement as an orchestral musician was at 15 years of age Back in Copenhagen he formed with his brothers Leonard and Sven Gyldmark and formed the Gyldmark trio, which played for the silent film projections. He also acted under the name of Sid Merriman.

== See also ==
- List of Danish composers
