= Povl Hamburger =

Danish musician

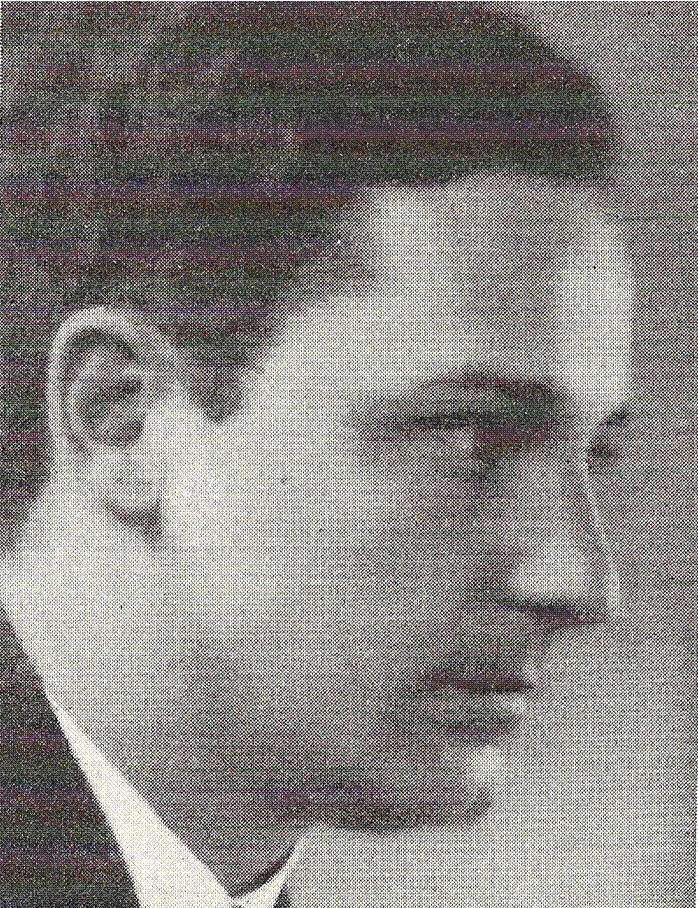

Povl Hamburger (22 June 1901 – 20 November 1972) was a Danish organist, composer, and author. Notable works include Musikens Historie I-II, 1936–37, Harmonilære, 1939, Modulationslære, 1941, Kirketoneart, 1948, and Harmonisk analyse, 1951. He was once renowned for his ability to play the piano standing up.

== See also ==
- List of Danish composers
