= Johannes Erasmus Iversen =

Danish Baroque composer

Johannes Erasmus Iversen (1713 – 28 February 1755) was a Danish Baroque composer. He also worked as a teacher, musician, conductor and a concert organizer.

== Life ==
Originally a student at the University of Copenhagen, Iversen chose to make his living as a musician. From 1740, he regularly arranged public concerts together with other performers. This led to the creation of the Musical Society in 1744, which Iversen soon came to lead. The organization was both a musical society and an academy of music.

The Society was closed down in 1749, but soon after Iversen created a new Collegium Musicum. This new society consisted in part of musicians educated by Iversen. When Iversen was appointed precentor in Vor Frue Kirke, the cathedral of Copenhagen, the concerts by the new society diminished. Iversen himself apparently rarely gave concerts in public after that.

== Work ==
Iversens compositions have apparently been lost, but it is known that he composed several cantatas. The titles of these have been preserved, among them Forsynstempelet (English: Temple of Providence) from 1747. As cantor at the university, he also composed several works for various festivities at the university. Among these were a cantata from 1752 in memory of Queen Louise, who was married to King Frederick V and died in 1751. Another cantata was composed in honor of the new queen Juliana Maria, who married Frederick V in 1752. One of his last works was the mourning music over his friend Ludvig Holberg, a famous Danish playwright.

== See also ==
- List of Danish composers
