= Joseph Glæser =

Danish composer and organist

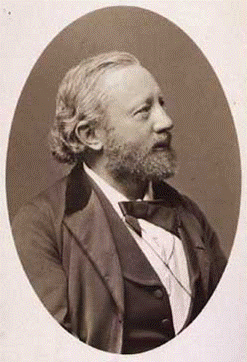

Joseph August Eduard Friedrich Glæser (25 November 1835 – 29 September 1891) was a Danish composer and organist.

He produced some 300 music compositions. This included the work Vaarsang.

He was born in Berlin, Germany, and died in Hillerød.

== Notable works ==
- Høje Nord, Friheds Hjem (1869)
- duets
- firstemmige mandssange
- some hymn tunes
- and oratorio (1858)
- piano pieces for 2 or 4 hands
- Alle mulige Roller (1857)
- Gildet paa Solhaug (1861)
- En gammel Soldat
- Jægerne (skuespil 1860)
- et treakts-syngestykke
- Fjernt fra Danmark (ballet 1860)
- Droslen slog i Skov sin klare Trille (romance 1857)
- Velkommen lærkelil

== See also ==
- List of Danish composers
