= Morten Olsen (composer) =

Danish musician and composer

Morten Olsen (born 1961) is a Danish composer.

== Life ==
Olsen began his musical career within electronic jazz fusion music in the 1980s. Today he is connected with modern classical music.

Olsen graduated from the Royal Danish Academy of Music in Copenhagen in 1992; furthermore, he was educated as a double bassist. Since then, he has composed works for solo instruments, orchestras, and choral works.

In 1990, Olsen was one of the founders of Athelas Sinfonietta Copenhagen, a Danish ensemble. He has also composed four works for Esbjerg Ensemble in the years 2004-2005 and 2007–2008. In later years, he has also worked with various international orchestras, e.g. the French TM+ and Ensemble Alternance.

== Work ==
Morten Olsen is inspired by the classical tradition, but his compositions are marked by an experimenting and unpredictable tonality. His music ranges from dramatic to more somber works.

== See also ==
- List of Danish composers
