= Hanne Rømer =

Danish composer, musician, and singer

Hanne Rømer (born July 29, 1949) is a Danish composer, musician and singer. She also teaches and conducts.

In 1975, she created the rock group Hos Anna together with her sister Lotte Rømer as well as Karen Mortensen, Irene Becker and Bente Dichmann. The group performed frequently at Vallekilde Højskole until it was dissolved in 1980. Rømer was also a member of the women's band Hexehyl which started in 1978.

== See also ==
- List of Danish composers
