= Jakob Lorentzen =

Danish musician

Jakob Lorentzen (born 1968) is a Danish organ soloist and chamber musician. He is organist and choir master of the Holmen Church (The Royal Naval Church in Copenhagen) and Master of the music at Christiansborg Palace Chapel, both principal churches in the Copenhagen city.

Jakob Lorentzen graduated as a 14 year old in 1982 with the preliminary organist exam from the Seminary of Zahle in Copenhagen, where he was a pupil of Carl Riess and hereby became the youngest graduate organist in Denmark. He received his undergraduate diploma at the Royal Danish Academy of Music.

In 1992, he moved to Paris, where he became organist at the Danish Church and he studied piano (Christine Paraschos), improvisation (Pierre Cogen) and organ (Susan Landale) in the soloist class at the music conservatory. At the final exam in 1995 he was unanimously awarded the 1st prize of virtuosity by the jury ("Prix de Virtuosité à l'Unanimité + Félicitations"). He has since performed vigorously as a soloist at home and abroad, on radio and television, participated as soloist in international festivals, participated in several recordings of CD's and movies, as well as he has published a huge series of works for Danish publishers.

Jakob Lorentzen cooperates with many prominent artists, for example cellist Andreas Brantelid, soprano Ditte Andersen, flutists Janne Thomsen and trombone professor Jesper Juul. Since 2010, Jakob Lorentzen also has formed a Duo with his wife, the soprano Monica Stevns.

Jakob Lorentzen is in particular known for his skills as live organ improviser (silent movies), and he is teaching organ improvisation at the Academy of Music in Aarhus.

In 2006, Jakob Lorentzen played in Christiansborg Palace Chapel for the christening of His Royal Highness the Crown Prince Christian of Denmark

In 2019 he was awarded the Knight’s Cross by Her Majesty The Queen Margrethe of Denmark.

Among the numerous prizes he has been awarded is the Schröders Music Award, the Frobenius Music Award, the Queen Ingrid's Commemoration Medal and the Prince Henrik of Denmark Commemoration Medal.

== See also ==
- List of Danish composers
