= Christian Hildebrandt =

Danish composer (born 1967)

Christian Hildebrandt (born 30 May 1967 in Dragør) is a Danish composer.

== See also ==
- List of Danish composers
