= Ejnar Jacobsen =

Danish composer

Ejnar Jacobsen (June 9, 1897 – July 17, 1970) was a Danish composer.

== See also ==
- List of Danish composers
