= Margaret Hamerik =

Danish musician

Margaret Elizabeth Hamerik (13 December 1867 – 30 October 1942) was a Danish composer and pianist.

== See also ==
- List of Danish composers
