= Carl Ludvig Gerlach =

Danish composer and opera singer

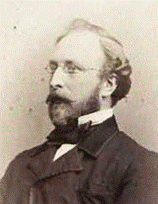

Carl Ludvig Gerlach (April 26, 1832 – September 13, 1893) was a Danish composer and opera singer. He was also a voice teacher and wrote texts on vocal pedagogy.

== Notable works ==
- Kjærlighed er trolddom (1856)
- 3 Charakteerstykker (1859)
- Fader vor (1862)
- Jesus opvækker Lazarus (1870)
- Kejserfesten paa Kreml (1875)
- Sang til Lygtemænd (1875)
- Meza
- Forbandet Kain udi ørken gik

== See also ==
- List of Danish composers
