= Knud Harder =

Danish composer

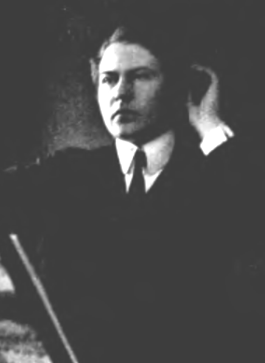

Knud Harder (31 March 1885 – 1967) was a Danish composer, organist and conductor.

== See also ==
- List of Danish composers
