= Otto Dütsch =

Danish composer

Otto Johann Anton Dütsch (also Otton Ivanovich Dyutsh; May 25, 1823 – April 23, 1863) was a Danish composer, who worked in St. Petersburg for most of his short career.

He was the son of Joachim Dütsch who worked for the Danish finance ministry and was also a music teacher at the Institute for the Blind. As a 5-year-old junior Dütsch was taught by Giuseppe Siboni at the Copenhagen Conservatory. In 1840 he went to Dessau in Germany to study for 3 years. He then travelled to St. Petersburg in Russia, where he established himself as a music teacher. In 1852 he became chorus repetiteur and organist at the Imperial Russian Theatre in St. Petersburg, and in 1862 professor of music theory there. He died in 1863 in Frankfurt.

The most notable of his works is the opera Kroaterinden (The Croatian Girl), which was successfully produced in St. Petersburg in 1860 with success, with excerpts played in Copenhagen in 1866 at the Euterpe music society. In addition he wrote songs and piano music.

== See also ==
- List of Danish composers
