= Karsten Vogel =

Danish composer

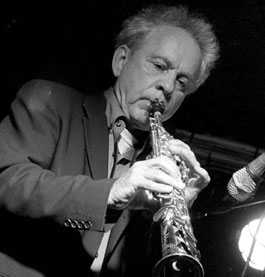

Background information
- Born: 11 January 1943 (age 82); Denmark
- Genres: Jazz, rock
- Occupation(s): Composer, conductor, saxophonist, music teacher
- Instrument: Saxophone
- Website: www.karstenvogel.dk

Karsten Vogel (born 11 January 1943) is a Danish composer. He is also a conductor, a saxophonist and a music teacher.

Vogel was born in Copenhagen and was awarded his MA in Danish language and literature in 1968 from University of Copenhagen. He has received several prizes for his works, e.g. a three-year scholarship from Statens Kunstfond.

He has composed for Radiojazzgruppen, the Danish National Chamber Orchestra and written a film score for the movie Er I bange, Er du grønlænder.

== Collaborators ==
He has performed together with several individuals and groups:

- Brødrene Vogels Kvartet (1967–1969)
- Cadentia Nova Danica (1967–1972)
- Burnin Red Ivanhoe
- Secret Oyster (1972–1978)
- Birds of Beauty (1977–1979)
- Kenneth Knudsen (from 1975)
- Frits Helmuth (who was reading H.C. Andersen and Oehlenschläger out loud)

== See also ==
- List of Danish composers
