= Christian Debois =

Danish composer

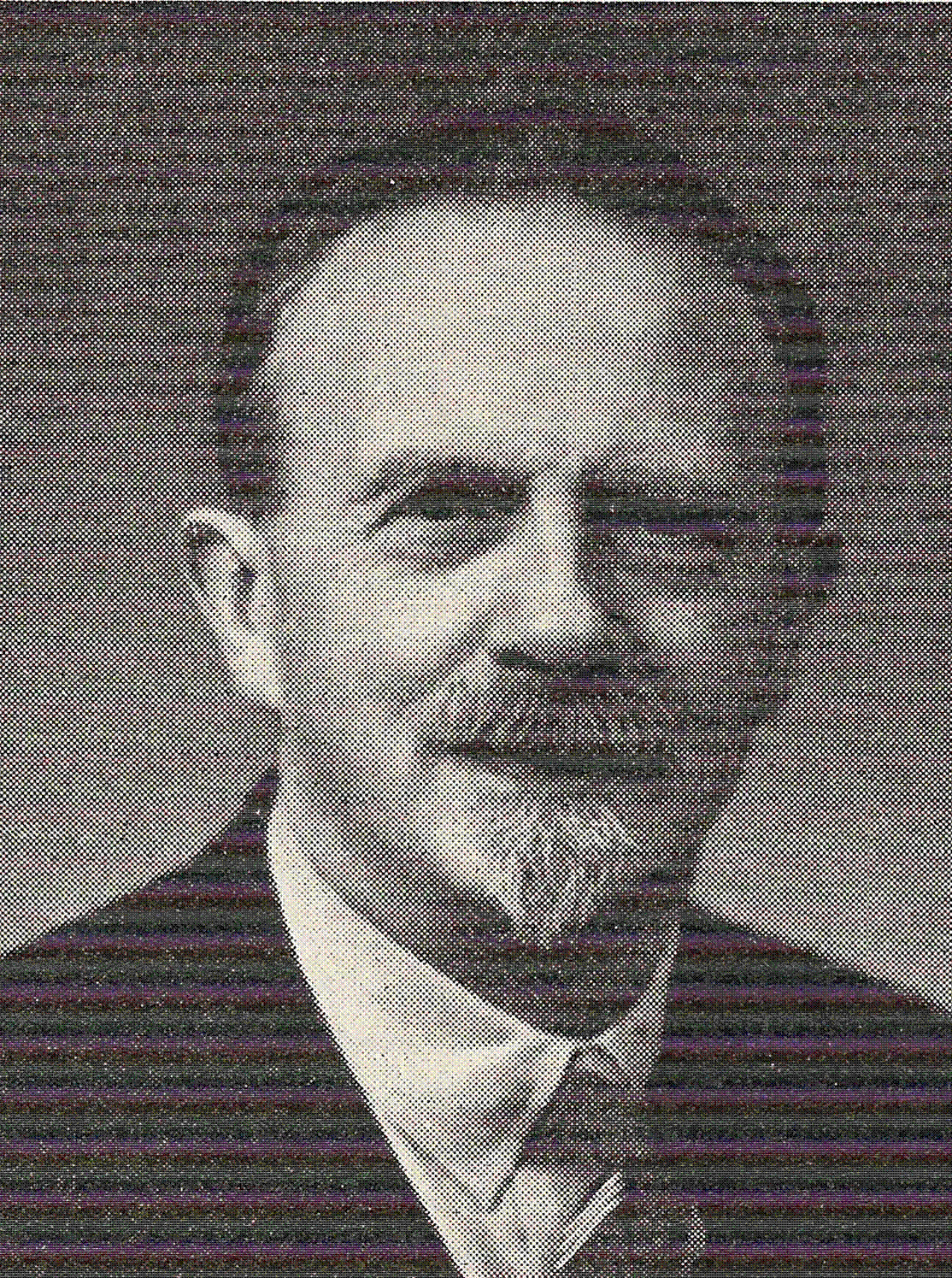

Christian H. Debois (June 27, 1882 – 1960) was a Danish composer.

== See also ==
- List of Danish composers
