= Cora Nyegaard =

Danish composer

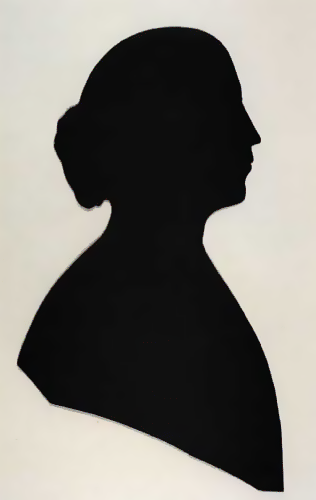
Silhouette of Cora Nyegaard

Cora Nyegaard (January 12, 1812 – April 28, 1891) was a Danish composer.

According to the Danish Women's Biographical Lexicon, Cora started composing music when she was around ten years old and she was often asked to create melodies for poems sung by close family and friends. Much later in life, she composed dancing music for piano, a Capella music, hymns, and over one hundred songs. In 1845, Cora married a priest and stopped composing music. She instead devoted her life to her duties as a house wife.

== See also ==
- List of Danish composers
