= Emilie da Fonseca =

Norwegian-Danish stage actress and opera singer

Emilie da Fonseca, married surnames Muller and Bratz (31 December 1803 – 8 May 1884) was a Norwegian-Danish stage actress and opera singer of Portuguese descent. She belonged to the pioneer group of artists in the first national theatre in Norway. She was also among the most noted artists of her time in Norway.

== Life ==
Emilie da Fonseca was born in Copenhagen, Denmark. She was the daughter of Portugal-born Abraham da Fonseca (1776–1849) and Marie Sofie Kiærskou (1784–1863). She and her sister Ida Henriette da Fonseca (1802–1858) were students of Giuseppe Siboni (1780–1839), choir master of the Royal Danish Theatre Opera in Copenhagen. She debuted in October 1827 as Susanna in The Marriage of Figaro at the Copenhagen Opera, and was given a position there alongside her sister the same year.

In 1831, she left Denmark and was given a position at the newly opened Christiania Public Theatre (Christiania Offentlige Theater) in Christiania (now Oslo). In Norway, she became one of the most noted artists. She also performed as a concert singer in the concerts arranged by the musical society, which performed many arias from famous operas in the Norwegian capital at this time.

She first married in 1839 to music teacher Ludvig Ernst Müller who died ca. 1840. After his death, she was married in 1841 to artist Ludvig Wilhelm Theodor Bratz (1811-1868).
