= Axel Jørgensen =

Danish composer

Axel Jørgensen (1881–1947) was a Danish composer.

== Works ==
- Romance for Trombone and Piano, Op.21
- Suite for Trombone and Piano, Op.22 (Dedicated to Anton Hansen)
- Caprice Orientale for trumpet and piano
- Brass Quintet (1942)

== See also ==
- List of Danish composers
