= Georg Grothe =

Danish composer

Georg Grothe (1822 – 5 May 1876) was a Danish composer and music teacher.

== See also ==
- List of Danish composers
