= Michael Ehregott Grose =

Danish organist and composer

Michael Ehregott Grose (1747 – 24 September 1795) was a Danish organist and composer. Notable works include Samling af lette Harpe, Claveer og Syngestykker for Liebhavere og Begyndere (1791) and Morgenen (1793).

== See also ==
- List of Danish composers
