= Carl Johan Frydensberg =

Danish composer

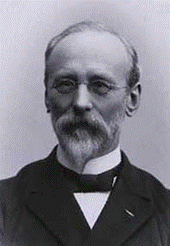

Carl Johan Frydensberg (1 December 1835 - 18 March 1904) was a Danish composer.

== See also ==
- List of Danish composers
