= Egil Harder =

Danish composer

Egil Georg Harder (7 April 1917 – 7 April 1997) was a Danish pianist, composer, conductor, and music educator.

== Early life and education ==
Egil Harder was born in Copenhagen, Denmark. He showed an early interest in music and studied at the Royal Danish Academy of Music, where he was mentored by prominent Danish composers of the time. He studied with Edwin Fischer.

== Career ==
Harder was known for his contributions to Danish classical music, with a focus on orchestral and chamber works. He was also a prolific composer of choral music, and his works were performed by various choirs and ensembles throughout Denmark.

In addition to his work as a composer, Harder was an esteemed conductor. He worked with several orchestras and choirs across Denmark and was known for his dedication to promoting Danish music. His influence extended to music education, where he served as a professor at the Royal Danish Academy of Music, mentoring the next generation of Danish composers and musicians.

== Personal life and legacy ==
Egil Harder married violinist Tutter Givskov, who was 13 years his junior.

He died on his 80th birthday in 1997. His legacy continues through his compositions, which are still performed today, and through the impact he had on his students and the Danish music community.

== Notable works ==
- Rokoko-vals (salonorkester 1936)
- Juletræet med sin pynt (1940)
- Lille suite for strygeorkester (1942)
- Den blå anemone 1945)
- Spansk dans for orkester (1946)
- Romance nr. 1 D-dur (violin and piano 1982)
- Romance nr. 2 D-dur (violin and piano 1983)
- Liseleje Jubilæumsmarch (1984)
- Romance nr. 3 a-mol (violin and piano )
- Romance nr. 4 A-dur (violin and piano )
- Vuggevise f#-mol

== See also ==
- List of Danish composers
