= Kenneth Thordal =

Danish musician and composer

Kenneth Thordal (born 16 October 1965 in Copenhagen) is a Danish musician, songwriter, music producer, composer, writer and translator.

Among other things, Thordal is known for writing the Danish translation of the lyrics and dialogue of the Broadway musical The Book of Mormon for Det Ny Teater, directed by Kasper Holten.

== See also ==
- Danish Music Awards
- List of Danish composers
- Music of Denmark
