= Peter Grønland =

Danish composer

Peter Grønland (15 October 1761 – 30 December 1825) was a Danish composer, music collector, and civil servant.

== Notable works ==
- Melodien zu den gesellschaftlichen Liederbuche (1796)
- Notenbuch zu das akademischen Liederbuchs erstem Bändchen (1783)
- Wundersame Liebesgeschichte der schönen Magelone und des Grafen Peter (1813)
- Osterfeyer (1818)
- Alte schwedische Volks-Melodien (1818)
- Zwey Sonette
- Lieder, Balladen und Romanzen von Goethe
- Die erste Walburgisnacht (Goethe)

== See also ==
- List of Danish composers
