= Henning Elbirk =

Danish composer

Henning Bruun Elbirk (8 November 1908 – 6 May 1985) was a Danish composer and conductor.

== Career ==
He founded the Radio Denmark's Boys Choir in 1929 and went on to lead the choir for the next 50 years until 1979. The choir toured across the world, holding concerts in the Soviet Union, Bulgaria, Canada and Israel. From 1968 to 1979, the choir also toured across the United States. In 1972, the choir sang the American National Anthem in Candlestick Park in front of 62'000 spectators and 35 million TV-viewers.

In 1979, he was awarded the Order of the Dannebrog.

== See also ==
- List of Danish composers
