= Johan Christian Gebauer =

Danish musician

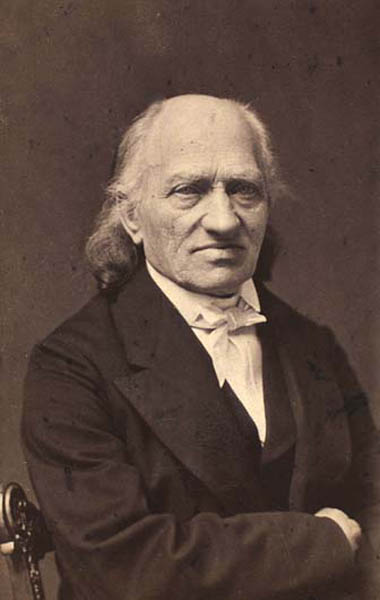
Johan Christian Gebauer (date unknown)

Johann Christian Gebauer (6 August 1808 – 24 January 1884) was a Danish composer, organist and music theorist.

== Background ==
Gebauer was born in Copenhagen, Denmark. His father was the painter, Christian David Gebauer (1777–1831). He lived with his paternal grandmother during his childhood in Christiansfeld where he received a strict and religious upbringing.

Gebauer showed promise as a musician early on. He received his first formal training in music from German-born composer Friedrich Kuhlau. Later Royal Court composer Christoph Ernst Friedrich Weyse and still later composer Peter Casper Krossing taught Gebauer music, although Kuhlau remained the most influential.

== Music career ==
Gebauer took on teaching music after completing his formal training. In 1842, he became editor of "Sangfuglen", a compilation of the compositions of budding Danish composers. He was employed at the Royal Danish Academy of Music as a teacher in harmony from 1866-1883. In 1870, his collected songs were published and he received the title of professor in 1876.

In 1846, he was given the job of the organist at St. Peter's Church, Copenhagen. From 1859, he held the position of organist at Church of the Holy Ghost, Copenhagen, a job he held until his death.

== Personal life ==
In 1844, he married Anna Kirstine Jensine Langgaard (1818-1876). He died at Frederiksberg in 1884 and was buried at Solbjerg.

== See also ==
- List of Danish composers
