= Andreas P. Nielsen =

Danish author and composer

Andreas P. Nielsen (8 May 1953 – 4 June 2011), was a Danish author and composer.

Nielsen was born in Kolding, Denmark. He was married to singer and composer, Inge-Marie Nielsen, with whom he directed the Dræsinebanden (orchestra). Since its inauguration in 1988 the aforementioned orchestra has presented concerts across Denmark and sold more than 800,000 records. The couple produced an annual summer music festival at the Cafe Dræsinen on the island of Ærø featuring well known (especially in Denmark) musicians.

== See also ==
- List of Danish composers
