= Lars Hegaard =

Danish composer and guitarist

Lars Hegaard (born 1950) is a Danish composer and guitarist.

== See also ==
- List of Danish composers
