= Johanne Fenger =

Danish composer (1836–1913)

Johanne Amalie Fenger (September 5, 1836 – August 11, 1913) was a Danish composer.

Fenger was born in the town of Lynge to a family of priests, doctors and officials. Her father was the priest and theologian Johannes Ferdinand Fenger. Fenger composed music from a young age, and her family's association with the poet Bernhard Severin Ingemann likely influenced her musical development and interest in composing songs for literary texts.

When her father was given a new parish in Høje Tåstrup in 1854, 18-year-old Fenger was able to travel to Copenhagen by train to receive piano and music theory lessons from Leopold Rosenfeld and Edvard Helsted. She was also musically influenced by her relative Christian Barnekow, who was a composer and the president of the Society for the Publication of Danish Music. From 1866 to 1911, Fenger published 46 songs and two piano pieces, mainly in collections of 6-8 pieces. Almost all of her works were published prior to 1885. Fenger's early works were inspired by Grundtvigian philosophy and were usually based on spiritual or folk-historical texts. Her notable later compositions include Lyriske Sange (Lyric Songs) in 1881 and Digte af Helene Nyblom (Poems by Helena Nyblom) in 1884.

After her parents' deaths, Johanne Fenger lived with her uncle Carl Emil Fenger and taught choir and piano. In 1885, Fenger suffered an apoplectic seizure (stroke), which partially blinded her and caused her to experience delusions. She was admitted to a psychiatric hospital and remained there until 1896. Her last composition, Menneskets Engle (The Angels of Man), was published in 1904.

== Notable works ==
- Sex danske Sange (1866)
- Ahasverus (1871)
- Lyriske Sange (1881)
- Digte af Helene Nyblom (1884)
- Menneskets Engle (1904)

== See also ==
- List of Danish composers
