= Johan Darbes =

Danish composer and violinist

Johan Anton Peter Poul Darbes (1750–June 15, 1815) was a Danish composer and violinist in the Chapels Royal from 1770-1786.

== See also ==
- List of Danish composers
