= Jørgen Heide =

16th-century Danish composer

Jørgen Heide or Heyde (fl. 1542–1556) was a Danish musician and composer at the court of King Christian III of Denmark.

== See also ==
- List of Danish composers
