= Frederikke Løvenskiold =

Danish composer (1785–1876)

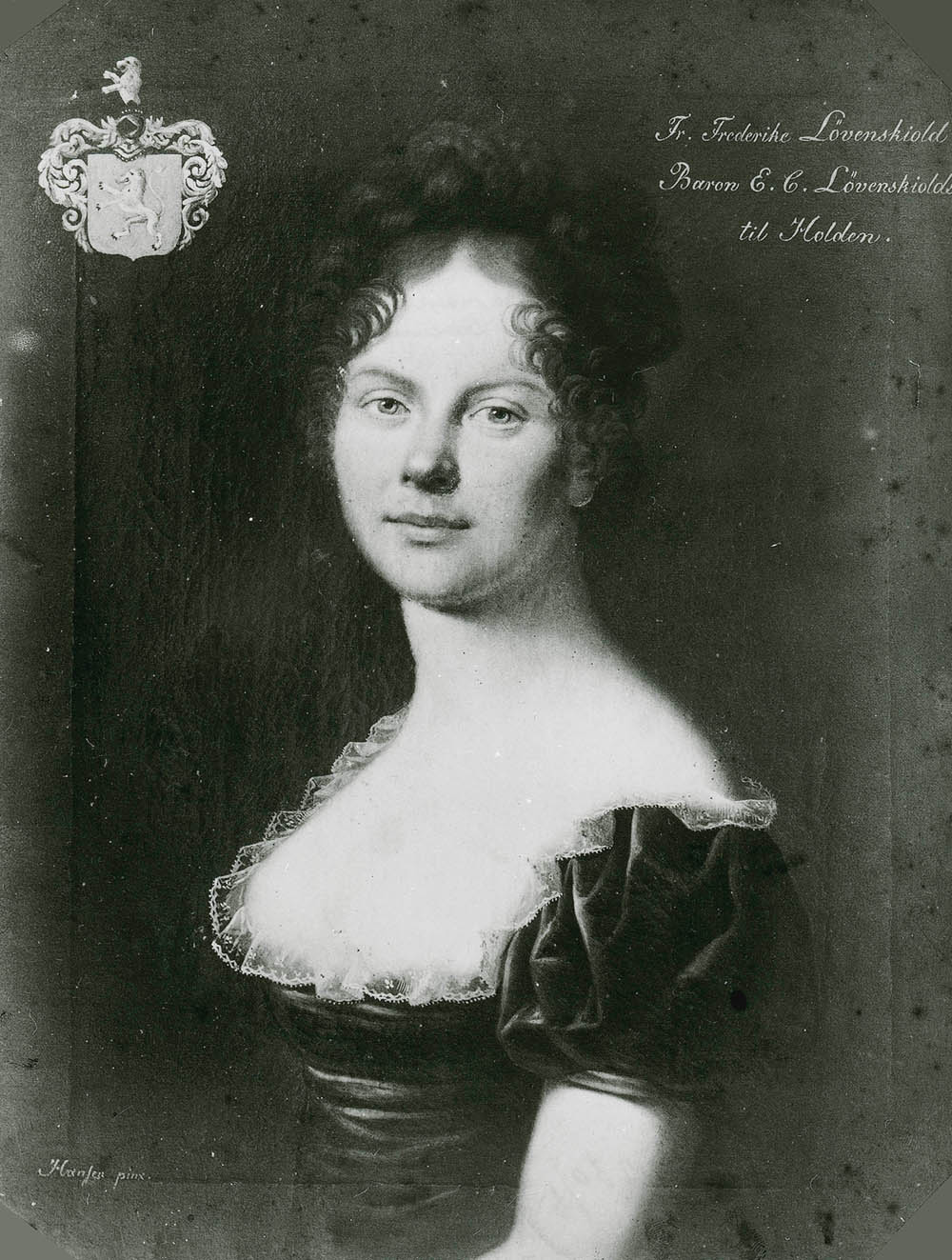

Margrethe Frederikke Sophie Løvenskiold (16 January 1785 – 2 June 1876) was a Danish composer.

== See also ==
- List of Danish composers
