= Niels Peter Jensen =

Danish composer, flutist and organist (1802–1846)

Niels Peter Jensen (23 July 1802 – 19 October 1846) was a Danish composer, flutist and organist.

== Biography ==
Niels Peter Jensen was an organ pupil of Friedrich Kuhlau. Since 1828 he was organist at St. Peter's Church (Petrikirche) in Copenhagen. As well, he was a flute virtuoso and teacher. He composed incidental music and numerous pieces for flute and for piano.

Among his students included J.P.E. Hartmann.

== Notable works ==
=== Flute ===
- 3 Duos for 2 Flutes, Op.9
- 6 Duos for 2 Flutes, Op.16
- 12 Etudes for Flute, Op.25
- 3 Fantasies-Caprices for Flute, Op.14
- Flute Sonata, Op.6
- Flute Sonata, Op.18
- 6 Rondeaux Faciles, Op.13
- 6 Solos for Flute, Op.17

== See also ==
- List of Danish composers
- Free scores by Niels Peter Jensen at the International Music Score Library Project (IMSLP)
