= Hans Hansen (composer) =

Danish composer

Hans Hansen (March 2, 1817 – November 1, 1878) was a Danish composer.

He specialised in works involving the clarinet.

== See also ==
- List of Danish composers
