= Bjørn Hjelmborg =

Danish musician (1911–1994)

Bjørn Hjelmborg (25 January 1911 – 1994) was a Danish composer and organist.

He studied at the Royal Danish Academy of Music and the University of Copenhagen obtaining a Master of Arts in Musicology in 1944.

He mainly worked in classical music, including organwork and psalms. He was a classical organist and composer.

He also wrote on the history of early operas.

== See also ==
- List of Danish composers
