= Julius Foss =

Danish musician

Julius Christian Foss (21 April 1879 – 23 June 1953) was a Danish organist and music historian.

== See also ==
- List of Danish composers
