= Bo Gunge =

Danish composer (born 1964)

Bo Gunge (born 22 April 1964 in Copenhagen) is a Danish composer.

== See also ==
- List of Danish composers
