= Aksel Agerby =

Danish composer and musician (1889–1942)

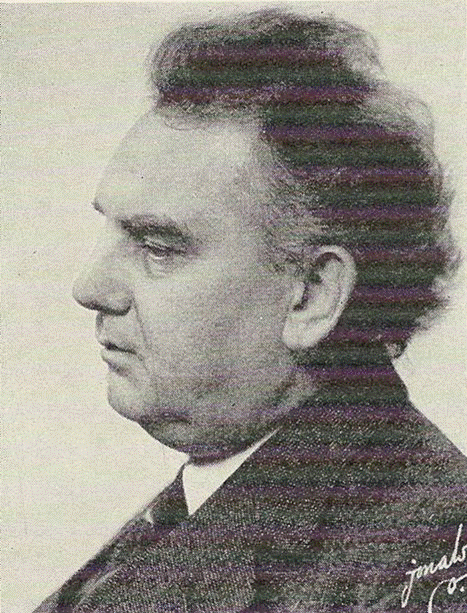
Aksel Agerby

Aksel Agerby (29 May 1889 – 20 March 1942) was a Danish composer, organist, and music administrator. He also operated his own music publishing company, which published both his work and those of others.

The majority of Agerby's work as a composer was written for keyboard instruments. His most enduring work, the melody for Jeg er havren, was one of many Danish folk songs that he created music for.

== Personal life ==
Aksel Andersen was born in Viborg on 29 May 1889 to Christian Andersen (1848–1913) and Mette Marie Jensen (1858–1896). His father, Christian, was a cobbler at the time, though he later became an archivist. Aksel and his father changed their surname in 1905 from Andersen to Agerby.

On 5 October 1923 Agerby married Astrid Sofie Louise Nielsen (1884–1946) in Copenhagen. He died on 20 March 1942 in Copenhagen. He and his wife are buried at Solbjerg Park Cemetery.

== Work ==
Agerby was blind and was trained as an organist and pianist at the Institute for the Blind and Partially Sighted. He also studied under Nicolaj Hansen, Frederik Fribert, and Victor Bendix. From 1921, he was an organist at the Copenhagen Funeral service. From 1930 until his death, he played the organ at Brønshøj Church.

He is chiefly remembered for one piece of music, the melody for Jeg er havren, which was composed to lyrics written by Jeppe Aakjær. A few other songs of his were recorded, some with Aksel Schiøtz. His musical output also included some songs and a few instrumental compositions, sometimes backed up by an orchestra. Most of his music was written for keyboard instruments. He also composed a number of works for choirs, as well as a handful of pieces for larger ensembles.

His legacy and importance to the Danish music scene lies beyond his contributions as a composer. He was an energetic and charismatic President of Det unge tonekunstnerselskab (DUT; lit. 'the Young Musician's Society'), which was, and continues to be, involved in the International Society for Contemporary Music. Agerby was chairman of the DUT from 1929 until his death, and had strong opinions and the ability to make things happen. He managed to execute a merger with the New Music (Danish: Ny Musik) Organization, thereby creating a more powerful association for contemporary music. In 1939, he received a royal charter for the Unge Musikeres Fund, a foundation which by the time of his death had granted about 2,600 DKK to young musicians.

== Compositions ==
=== Piano Music ===
- Jeg er havren (1916)
- Spurvene ved Helliggejst
- Jyske viser (10 songs)
- Flammende ungdom
- Jeg ved ej hvorfra du kommer
- Majnat
- Liljekonval
- Vintergækker
- En Dag
- Vor mor
- Hørvise
- Hvide børn og sorte børn

=== Choral compositions ===
- Vor tid (mixed choir)
- Glæde over foråret (male choir)
- Danmark, kære mor (male choir)
- Kløver (male choir)

=== Other compositions ===
- Intermezzo (oboe and orchestra)
- Elegi (oboe and orchestra)
- Intermezzo pastorale (violin and piano)
- Humoreske (violin and piano)
- Aftenvandring (orchestra)
- Berceuse (violin and orchestra)
