= Paul Hellmuth =

Danish musician

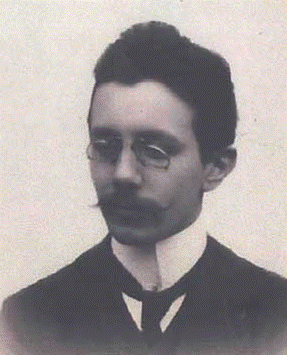
Paul Hellmuth

Paul Emil Friederich Hellmuth (1 November 1879 – June 1919) was a Danish organist and composer. Hellmuth was a student of Carl Nielsen and collaborated with Nielsen to harmonize the melodies of some of Nielssen's hymns, for example Forunderligt at sige.

== See also ==
- List of Danish composers
