= Bent Hesselmann =

Danish saxophonist, flautist, and composer

Bent Hesselmann (born 20 February 1939 in Copenhagen) is a Danish saxophonist, flautist and composer.

== See also ==
- List of Danish composers
