= Knud Vad Thomsen =

Danish composer

- Born: 24 March 1905
- Died: 2 February 1971 (aged 65)
- Occupation: composer

Knud Vad Thomsen (24 March 1905 – 2 February 1971) was a Danish composer.

== Notable works ==
- Aquavitten (1959, Hans Hartvig Seedorff)
- Bissekræmmeren (1947, Nis Petersen)
- Cedric og Beatrice (1951, Jens Louis Petersen)
- De tyve bajere (Poul Sørensen)
- Elefantens vuggevise (1948, Harald H. Lund)
- Forår ved Mariager Fjord (Nis Petersen)
- Jeg plukker fløjsgræs (1951, Sigfred Pedersen)
- Krikken linder det trætte ben (1929, Aage Berntsen)
- Til glæden (Hulde engel) (1938, St. St Blicher)
- Tørresnoren (1955, Sigfred Pedersen)

== See also ==
- List of Danish composers
