= Jens Bjerre Jacobsen =

Danish composer and organist (1903–1986)

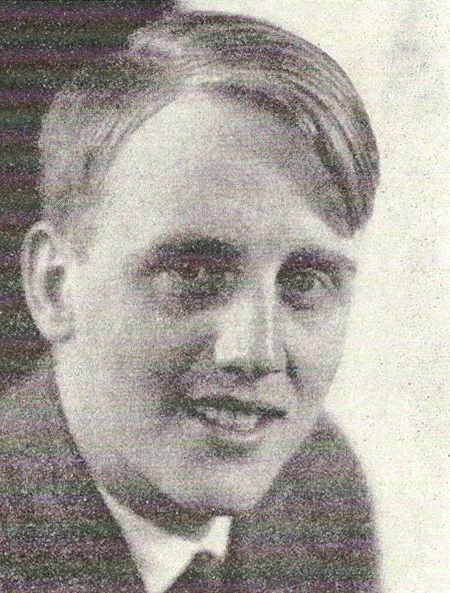

Jens Bjerre Jacobsen (13 October 1903 – 3 January 1986) was a Danish composer and organist.

Jacobsen was born in Aarhus but grew up in Salling, where his father was a Grundtvigian Community pastor in Rødding-Krejbjerg. Jacobsen learned to play the piano at an early age from the organist and composer Laurids Lauridsen. At 15, he got admission into the Royal Danish Academy of Music. The time spent at the academy gave his earliest songs and choral work a strong element of Thomas Laub and Carl Nielsen. However, Jacobsen himself never acknowledged this, and claimed that his career as a composer only began after he moved to Paris.

Jacobsen became an organist in Paris. Alfred Cortot, the famous pianist and conductor, taught him composition and honed his piano skills. Cortot was a big influence on Jacobsen. Under the former's tutelage, Jacobsen made immense progress as a composer, a development that is specially noticeable in his music from the 1930s onwards.

== Notable works ==
- Serenade (fløjte, obo og bratsch 1936)
- Mosaïque musicale nr. 1 (fløjte, violin og cello 1936)
- Sonatine (violin og klaver 1939)
- Koncertante (violin og klaver 1940)
- Duo concertante (cello og klaver 1942)
- Croquis musicaux (22 musikalske skitser fra Paris for violinsolo 1943)
- Sonate for violin og klaver (1945)
- Sonate for violoncel (1946)
- Nordisk Treklang (blandet kor og orkester 1946)
- Trio (violin, cello og klaver 1947)
- Madrigal con variazioni (orkester 1948)
- Serenade des vagabonds (fløjte, klaver, violin og cello 1949)
- Ouverture parisienne (orkester 1947)
- Mosaïque musicale nr. 2a (engelsk horn, violin og cello 1950)
- Croquis (obo og clarinet 1950)
- Variété musicale, elve etuder (fløjte 1950)
- Diapsalmata (cello og klaver 1953)
- Itokih (kor, blæserkvintet, to flygler og slagtøj 1954)
- Divertimento for blæserkvintet (1955)
- Duo (fløjte og engelsk horn 1955)
- Toccata con fughetta e Ciaccona (orgel 1956)
- Parabel (orgel 1956)
- Danserinden (orkester 1957)
- Kameliadamen (balletmusik 1958)
- Trolden som spillede kontrabas (1959)
- Æslets Skygge (1960)
- Herkules i Augiasstalden (radiohørespil 1961)
- En sjæl efter Døden (1962)
- Solosuite for obo (1962)
- Den hvide Souper (TV-ballet 1963)
- Stor ståhej for ingenting (blæsere 1963)
- Dionysisk Ouverture (violin 1964)
- Purgatorio (bratsch 1964)
- Riflessione (klarinet 1965)
- Før og nu (orkesterfantasi 1966)
- Mosaïque musicale nr. 2b (fløjte, cello og klaver 1974)
- Mosaïque musicale nr. 3 (fløjte, violin og cello 1974)
- Mosaïque musicale nr. 4 (fløjte, violin og cello 1975)
- Fire etuder (clarinet og klaver 1976)
- Fem korte stykker (cello og klaver 1980)

== See also ==
- List of Danish composers
