= Henrik Strube =

Danish guitarist and musician

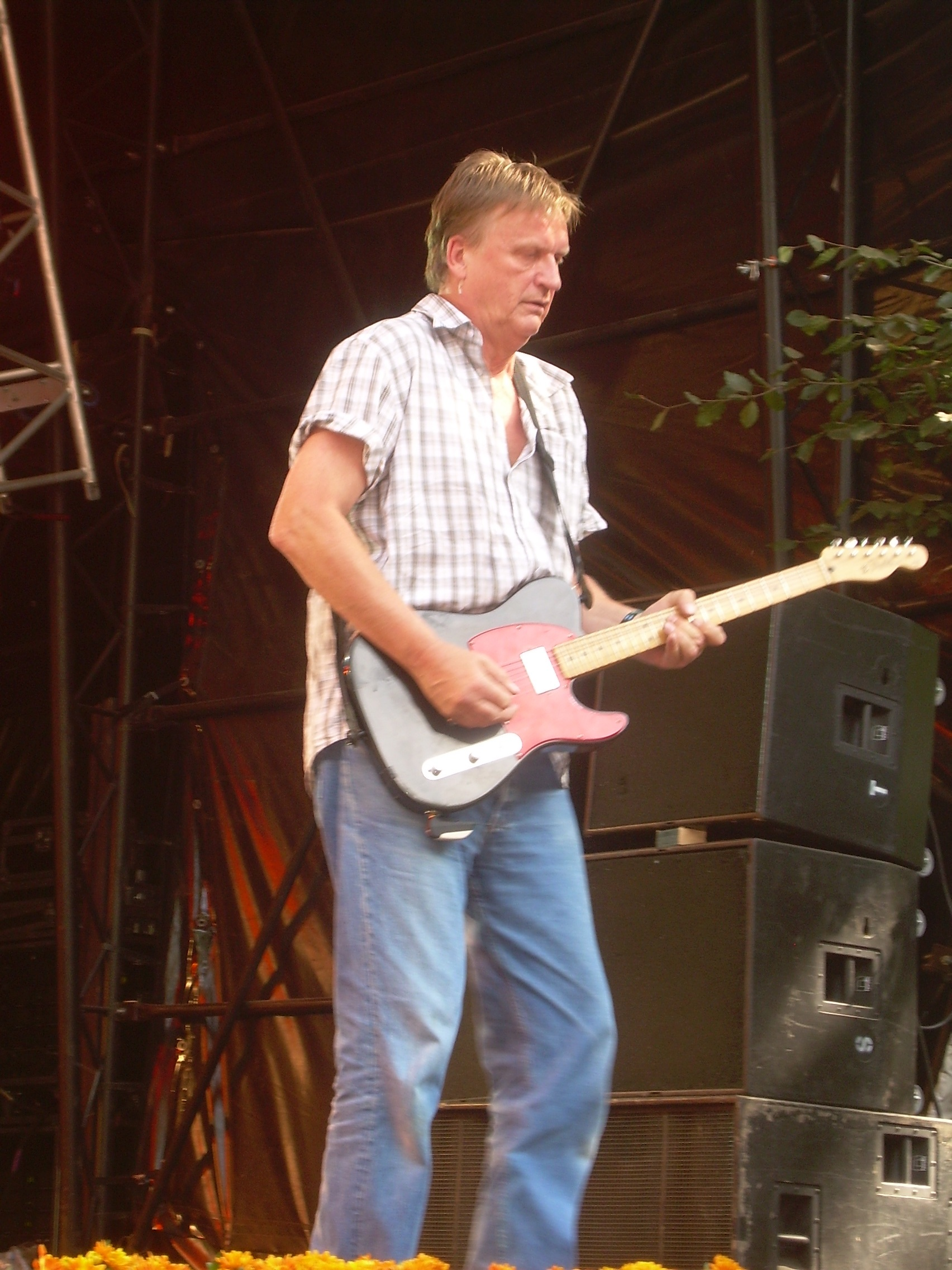

Henrik Strube (born 21 February 1949) is a Danish guitarist and musician.

== Discography ==
- Fødelandssange (1972)
- Ven og Fjende (1976)
- Jackpot (1977)
- Hunden er løs (1979)
- Den Flyvende Duo (1981)
- Unruhrig (1983)
- 8338 (1983)
- Som sol og måne (1985)
- Hjertets vagabonder (1986)
- Nyt land (1988)
- Bellevue (1990)
- Blå Himmel over byen (1997)
- Mærk'ligt (2002)
- STORYBEAT (2008)

== See also ==
- List of Danish composers
