= Jodle Birge =

Danish composer and singer

- Birth name: Birge Lønquist Hansen
- Born: November 6, 1945; Denmark
- Died: August 27, 2004 (aged 58)
- Genres: Country Music, yodelling
- Occupation(s): Composer, singer

Birge Lønquist Hansen (6 November 1945 – 27 August 2004), better known as Jodle Birge, was a Danish composer and singer. His most famous tracks were "Rigtige Venner" (Real Friends) from the Norwegian singer/songwriter Håkon Banken and "Tre hvide duer" (Three white doves). Jodle Birge sold over two million CDs. From 1992 to 2001 there was a museum for Jodle Birge in Silkeborg in Denmark.
A new and larger museum was opened on 22 July 2005.

== See also ==
- List of Danish composers
