= Søffren Degen =

Danish musician (1816–1885)

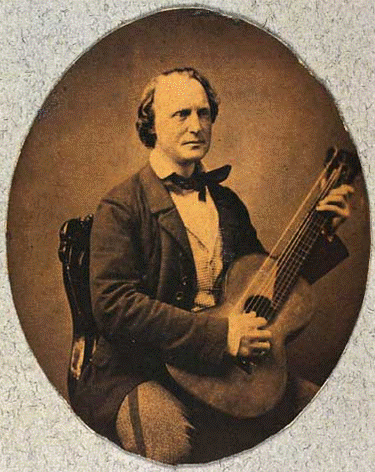
Søffren Degen

Søffren Degen (12 October 1816 – 17 July 1885) was a Danish classical guitarist and composer.

== See also ==
- List of Danish composers
