= Frantz Johannes Hansen =

Danish author (1810–1852)

Frantz Johannes Hansen (4 September 1810 in Copenhagen – 14 March 1852) was a Danish author and was also an amateur musician. He is buried at Assistens Cemetery in Copenhagen.

== Life ==
Frantz Johannes Hansen showed poetic talents at an early age. He studied with Hans Christian Andersen, and also took classes from Christoph Ernst Friedrich Weyse in 1828. While studying in college, Hansen published some poems in 1832 and his book Læsning for den fine Verden (Reading for the Fine World). From this book he received the nickname "Fine Hansen." In 1834, Hansen received a law degree, which later earned him a modest living, first working in the Archives Office. In 1848, he worked with the Ministry of Justice. Hansen, who enjoyed the outdoors, felt trapped inside his workplace. However, in his leisure time he continued to pursue his literary ambitions: in 1839 he issued a volume of Romantic poems, which contained one of his best-known pieces, "Korsaren og hans Brud" (The Corsair and his Bride). Under the pseudonym Torkel Trane, he published the novel Let Sind og Letsind (Light Mind and frivolity). Hansen attempted dramatic writing, some of which appeared at the Royal Danish Theatre, but did not have a successful debut. A comedy, En liden Hemmelighed (A Little Secret), was performed several times in 1894, and was probably his most successful dramatic work. After Hansen's death, his collection Lyriske Digte (Lyrical Poems, 1852) was published with a preface that gives a brief biography of the writer.

Notable works include 6 Galopper til Studenterforeningen (1836).

== See also ==
- List of Danish composers
