= Viggo Bielefeldt =

Danish composer (1851–1909)

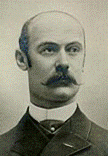
- Bielefeldt circa 1900s
- Born: Viggo Emil Bielefeldt; 16 October 1851; Copenhagen, Denmark
- Died: 17 December 1909 (aged 58); Copenhagen, Denmark
- Burial place: Hellerup Cemetery
- Education: Royal Danish Conservatory of Music
- Occupations: Composer, singer, cantor and music teacher
- Years active: 1872–1909
- Father: Heinrich Hellmuth Bielefeldt
- Honours: Titular Professor (1900) Dannebrogordenens Hæderstegn (1905)

Viggo Emil Bielefeldt (16 October 1851 – 17 December 1909) was a Danish composer, singer, cantor and music teacher. His father Heinrich Hellmuth Bielefeldt was an immigrant from Mecklenburg, Germany.

== Life and career ==
Bielefeldt was educated at the Royal Danish Conservatory of Music from 1867 to 1869 in among other things, singing and piano with Carl Helsted and August Winding respectively as teachers. He debuted as a romance singer on 2 March 1872 and was thereafter a well-known and valued singer in this field

In addition, he was a singing teacher at Horneman's music school and from 1883 at the Conservatory of Music. From 1880 he was cantor at Trinitatis Kirke and from 1887 at Holmens Kirke. For a time, shortly after Gade's death, he was also organist at the same church. In 1900 he was appointed titular professor. In 1892 he became a Knight of the Dannebrog and in 1905 a Dannebrogordenens Hæderstegn.

He is buried at Hellerup Kirkegård, with a gravestone made by J. Schannongs Granit-Industri.

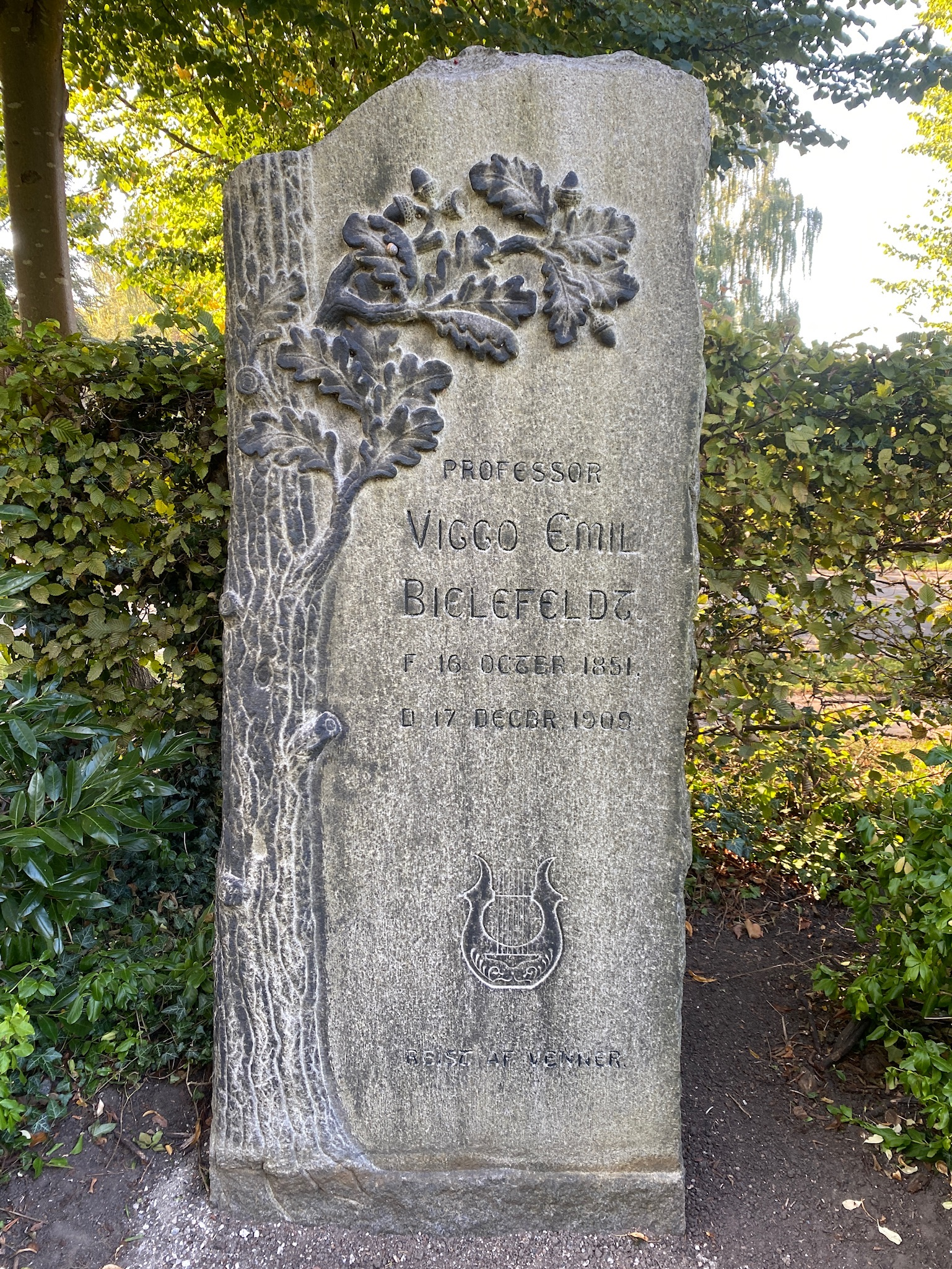

== Works ==
- A Honeymoon (mixed choir)
- David's 8th Psalme (male choir, tenor solo and brass instruments – 1883)
- Singing exercises (together with Emil Horneman)
- Melodies for the Book of Psalms for Church and Home – published by V. Bielefeldt (choral book – 1900)
- Mess book
- Masonic Cantata
- Cantata at the centennial celebration for the Battle of the Nest (1901)
