= Otto Hænning =

Danish musician

Otto Hænning (19 November 1916 – 7 February 2004) was a Danish composer and guitarist.

== See also ==
- List of Danish composers
