= Mads Hak =

Danish composer

Mads Hak (died 1555) was a Danish composer and mathematician.

== See also ==
- List of Danish composers
