= Poul Allin Erichsen =

Danish clarinetist and composer (1910–1970)

Poul Allin Erichsen (1910–1970) was a Danish clarinetist and composer. He was married to concert singer and violinist Lise Abrahams and is the father of the hornist and organist Jesper Allin.

== Early life ==
Poul Allin Erichsen belongs to a branch of the well-known musical family Allin, which originally came from Sweden. His great-grandfather JF Allin played in HC Lumbye's orchestra in Tivoli Concert Hall. His maternal grandfather Arthur Allin was the cathedral organist in Aarhus . The family also includes the royal chapel musicians Otto Allin, Georg Allin and Georg Allin Wilkenschildt in addition to the royal opera singer Hanna Allin.

After graduating from high school in his hometown of Aarhus, he studied with Aage Oxenvad (clarinetist) and Dagmar Bendix (pianist) as well as with Finn Høffding (theory) and Knud Jeppesen (composition) at the Royal Academy of Music (1929–33). He played as 2nd solo clarinetist in the Danish Radio Symphony Orchestra from 1935 to 1948 and then as 1st solo clarinetist from 1948 to the end of 1962, when he was appointed professor at the Danish Academy of Music. From 1954 to 1956, he was chairman of the Danish Radio Symphony Orchestra and managed to get Rafael Kubelik as a permanent guest conductor with the Danish Radio Symphony Orchestra. He was active in DUT both as a musician, conductor and organizer. Member of the Wind Quintet of 1932, which in addition to him consisted of Johan Bentzon, Waldemar Wolsing, Wilhelm Lanzky Otto (later Ingbert Michelsen ) and Kjell Roikjer (later Carl Bloch ). From 1956 until his death from cancer in 1970, Poul Allin Erichsen was a teacher of clarinet and chamber music at the Royal Danish Academy of Music, docent from 1960 and professor from 1962. His recording of Nicolai Malko's concerto for clarinet and orchestra with the Danish Radio Symphony Orchestra under the direction of the composer in 1952 is posted on DR's website Bonanza.

Allin Erichsen‘s wife, Lise Abrahams was Jewish so they fled to Sweden as family in October 1943 and did not return until May 1945. He immediately resumed his work with the Radio Symphony Orchestra. In Sweden he collaborated with other exiled dancers such as Herman D. Koppel, and together they composed the Hittarp Septet.

== Music ==
In Dansk Musik Tidsskrift (DMT), colleague Johan Bentzon wrote in 1942:

"As the last of this generation, on the border of the next, stands Poul Allin Erichsen. His works show talent in almost every direction one could wish for: melodic and thematic inventiveness, liberated rhythm, harmonic and tonal sense. One only lacks the final liberating embodiment of these possibilities to feel completely sure of his composer physiognomy; it is as if inner necessity does not lead him completely beyond the self-criticism and doubt that every composer has towards his work at the beginning, which the long pauses in his production could also indicate."

In DMT no. 3 1943, another colleague, Niels Viggo Bentzon, writes a somewhat reserved review of Allin Erichsen's Symphony no. 2 .
