= Harald Bjerg Emborg =

Danish composer

Harald Bjerg Emborg (1920–1982) was a Danish composer.

== See also ==
- List of Danish composers
