= Christian Joseph Rasmussen =

Danish composer

Christian Joseph Rasmussen (28 June 1845 – 6 October 1908) was a Danish composer.

== See also ==
- List of Danish composers
