= Jens Laursøn Emborg =

Danish organist and composer (1876–1957)

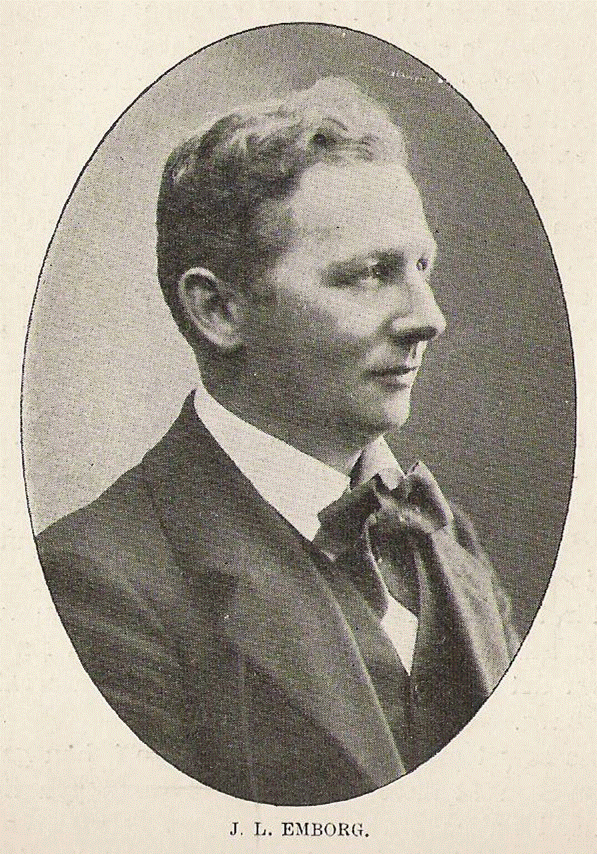

Jens Laursøn Emborg (22 December 1876, Ringe – 18 April 1957, Vordingborg) was a Danish organist and composer.

Together with Hakon Andersen he composed some songs for a 3-part mixed choir in the Danish folk school music style.

== See also ==
- List of Danish composers
