= Nicolaj Hansen =

Danish musician (1855–1932)

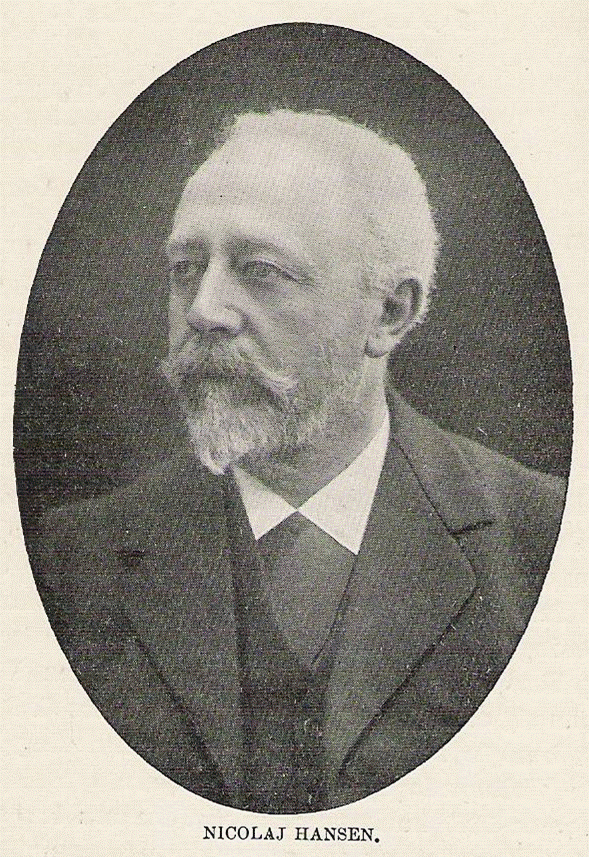
Johannes Nicolaj Hansen

Johannes Nicolaj Hansen (20 February 1855 – 25 December 1932) was a Danish composer and musician.

== Selected works ==
- Brødrene Ranzau (skuespil 1887)
- Den Anden April (skuespil 1887)
- Uden Midtpunkt (skuespil 1887)
- Lette Dragoner (operette 1892)
- Daphnis og Chloe (operette 1905)
- Kongens Hjerte (skuespil 1913)

== See also ==
- List of Danish composers
