= Johan Bartholdy =

Danish musician (1853–1904)

Conrad Johan Bartholdy
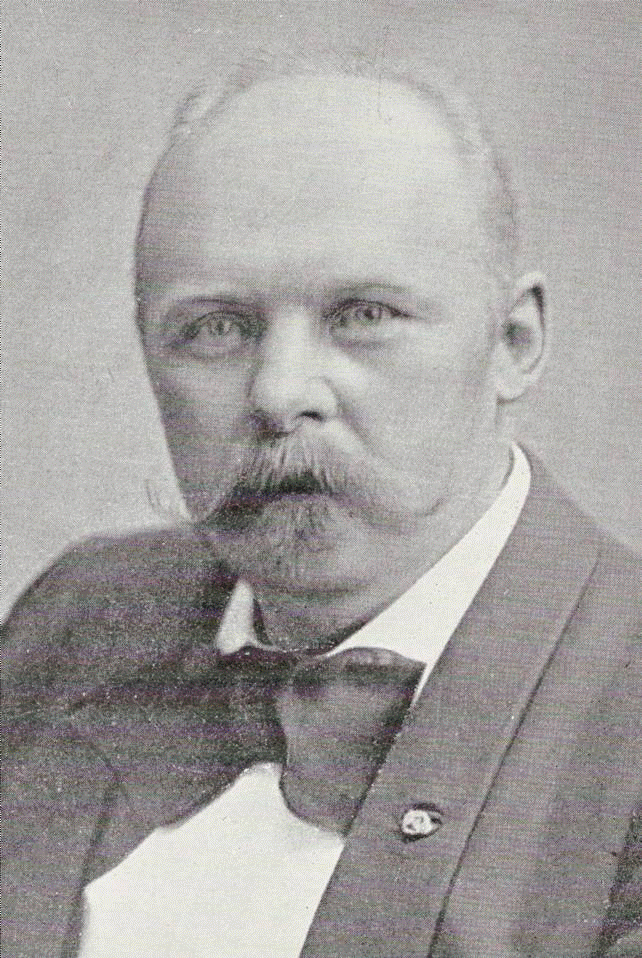
- Born: 12 March 1853; Hammel
- Died: 6 December 1904 (aged 51)
- Education: Århus Cathedral
- Occupation: Organist Composer Singing Teacher Conductor Author of music theory books

Conrad Johan Bartholdy (12 March 1853 – 6 December 1904) was a Danish organist, composer, singing teacher, conductor and author of music theory books. He was honored as a Titular Professor for the year 1900.

Bartholdy was born in Hammel, the son of the local pharmacist and was active as a student in Århus Cathedral from 1872. He began after school to study political science, but interrupted his studies to get a musical education. Among his teachers were Johann Christian Gebauer (theory) and Edmund Neupert (piano).
