= Aage Emborg =

Danish composer

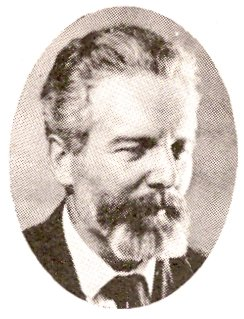

Aage Emborg (August 23, 1883 – 1953) was a Danish composer.

== See also ==
- List of Danish composers
