= Peter Casper Krossing =

Danish composer

Peter Casper Krossing (21 August 1793 – 1 September 1838) was a Danish composer. Some of his compositions are "Overture to the Drama Love's Omnipotence", "Symphony", "Nú Legg Ég Augun Aftur", and "Nu Lukker Sig Mit Øje".

== See also ==
- List of Danish composers
