= Peder Schall =

Danish composer

Peder Schall (1762–1820) was a Danish composer.

He was a performer in the Royal Danish Orchestra (Det Kongelige Kapel) and trained as a cellist.

== See also ==
- List of Danish composers
