= Georg Carl Bohlmann =

Danish music teacher, music director, organist and composer

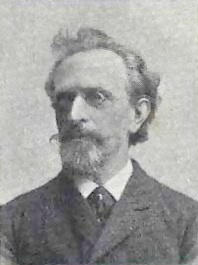
Georg Carl Bohlmann

Georg Carl Bohlmann (1838 – 1920) was a Danish music teacher, music director, organist and composer. He composed a number of major and minor compositions, including two symphonies, and several overtures. He also arranged music for other artists.

== Biography ==
Bohlman was born on 8 April 1838, the son of tobacco manufacturer Reinhard Georg Carl Bohlmann. Bohlmann studied with Charles Kjerulf, likely at the Mariboes School.

Bohlmann lived in Bremen from 1851–1859 and trained as a musician under conductor Carl Heinemann. He returned to Copenhagen, where he worked as a music teacher and arranger and a music theater director.

In 1865, he received the Anckerske scholarship and considered using it to studied in Rome.

From 1872 to 1876, Bohlmann was an organist in Svendborg. He moved back to Copenhagen and resumed his previous activities, in particular as a teacher of music theory and instrumentation. He also worked as the music director at the Odense Theater, the Hotel Marienlyst, and the Dagmar Theater (Dagmar Teatret).

Bohlmann worked on musical arrangement for other artists and also composed a number of major and minor compositions, including two symphonies, several overtures, and concert pieces for violin and other instruments. In 1886, the piece Brudefølget drar forbi (The Bridal Procession Passes By), Opus 19, No. 2, which was arranged by Bohlmann for the orchestra, was first played in Copenhagen. His own Vikingefærd (Viking Expedition) was also performed at the Gewandhaus in Leipzig.

Beginning in 1887, Bohlmann received an annual grant from the state. He also received a grant from the Raben-Lewetzauske Fund for the publication of instrumentation illustrations. From 1892 until his death, he was an organist at the Vestre Kirkegaards Chapel in Copenhagen.

Bohlmann died in 1920; he was 82.
