= Carl Helsted =

Danish composer

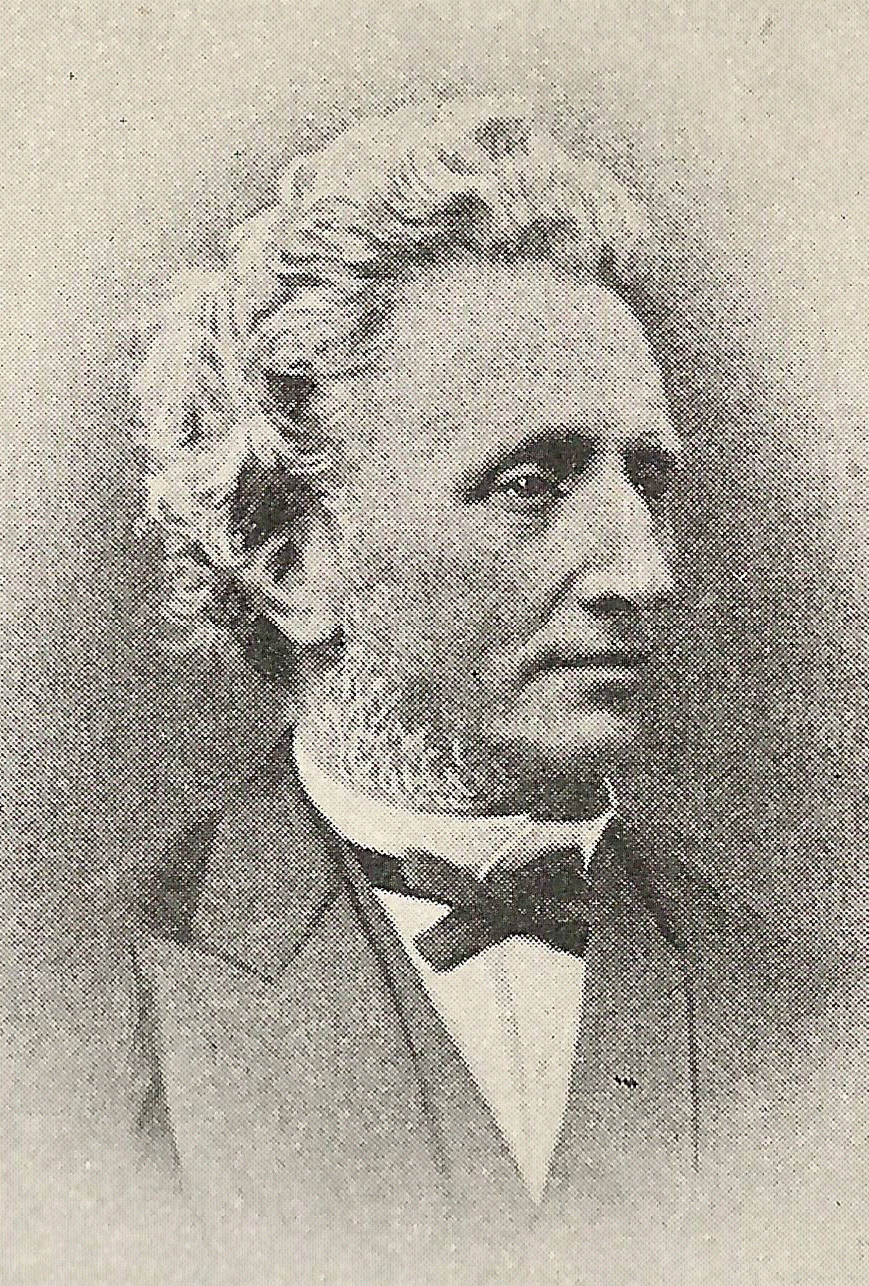
Carl Helsted

Carl Helsted (4 January 1818 – 7 June 1904) was a Danish composer. Nina Grieg studied voice with Helsted.

== See also ==
- List of Danish composers
