= Charles Kjerulf =

Danish composer and music critic (1858–1919)

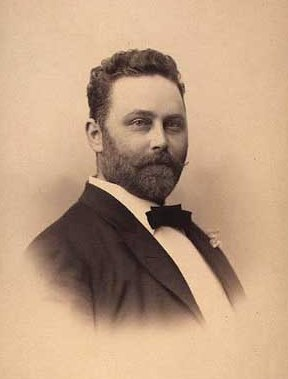
Charles Kjerulf

Charles Kjerulf (22 March 1858 – 22 August 1919) was a Danish composer and music critic.

== See also ==
- List of Danish composers
