= Hakon Andersen =

Danish organist and composer

Jens Hakon Johannes Andersen
- Born: 26 October 1875
- Died: 21 April 1959 (aged 83)
- Occupations: organist and composer

Jens Hakon Johannes Andersen (26 October 1875 – 21 April 1959) was a Danish organist and composer. He served as organist for a number of churches around Copenhagen throughout his career.

He wrote the music for the Danish children's song Se den kattekilling.

Together with Jens Laursøn Emborg he composed some songs for a 3-part mixed choir in the Danish folk school music style.
