= Peter Ferdinand Funck =

Danish violinist and composer

Peter Ferdinand Funck (1788 – 7 January 1859) was a Danish violinist and composer.

== See also ==
- List of Danish composers
