= 1962 in Nordic music =

The following is a list of notable events and compositions of the year 1962 in Nordic music.

== Events ==
- 18 March – The 7th Eurovision Song Contest is held in Luxembourg and won by France. Sweden and Finland finish in joint 7th place, whilst Denmark and Norway finish in joint 10th place with Switzerland.
- 29 May – At the 4th Annual Grammy Awards, Swedish-born singer Ann-Margret is nominated in the Best New Artist category. The Rome Opera Orchestra's recording of Turandot, featuring Jussi Björling and Birgit Nilsson, wins the Grammy Award for Best Opera Recording.
- unknown date
  - Finnish composer Seppo Mustonen becomes the first to create music by computer.
  - Erkki Kurenniemi begins construction for an electronic music recording studio for Helsinki University's Department of Musicology.

== New works ==
- Jón Leifs – Víkingasvar (Viking’s Answer)
- Gösta Nystroem – Symphony no 4 ("Sinfonia Shakespeariana")

== Popular music ==
- Bent Fabric – "Alley Cat" (#2 Australia; #7 US)
- Marion Rung – "Tipi-tii" (#1 Finland)

== New recordings ==
- Bent Fabric – Alley Cat

== Eurovision Song Contest ==
- Denmark in the Eurovision Song Contest 1962
- Finland in the Eurovision Song Contest 1962
- Norway in the Eurovision Song Contest 1962
- Sweden in the Eurovision Song Contest 1962

== Film music ==
- Harry Arnold – Biljett till paradiset
- Bent Fabric – Svinedrengen og prinsessen på ærten

== Births ==
- 6 August – Søren Hyldgaard, Danish film composer (died 2018)
- 22 October – Søren Reiff, Danish guitarist, producer and composer

== Deaths ==
- 24 April – Finn Bø, Norwegian songwriter, revue writer, playwright, journalist and theatre critic (born 1893)
- 24 June – Alf Andersen, Norwegian flautist (born 1928)
- 19 August – Emilius Bangert, Danish organist, composer and teacher (born 1883)
- 29 October – Siegfried Salomon, Danish composer (born 1885)
- 7 December – Kirsten Flagstad, Norwegian operatic soprano (born 1895)

== See also ==
- 1962 in Denmark
- 1962 in Iceland
- 1962 in Norwegian music
- 1962 in Sweden
