= 1974 in Nordic music =

The following is a list of notable events and releases that happened in Scandinavian music in 1974.

== Events ==
- 5 April – The first Vossajazz festival opens in Vossavangen, Norway, running until 7 April.
- 6 April – The Eurovision Song Contest is held in Brighton, UK, and is won by Swedish band ABBA, with the song "Waterloo". Finland and Norway finish in 13th and 14th place respectively.
- unknown date – The Swedish opera company NorrlandsOperan is founded in Umeå.

== New works ==
- Einar Englund – Piano Concerto No. 2
- Ulf Grahn – Two Dances
- Yngve Sköld – String quartet no. 4

== Top hit singles ==
- ABBA – "Honey, Honey" (#2 Germany; #4 Austria)
- Inger Lise Rypdal – "En spennende dag for Josefine" (#1 Norway)
- Anne-Karine Strøm & the Bendik Singers – "Hvor er du"

== Hit albums ==
- ABBA – Waterloo (#1 Norway, Sweden)
- Flying Norwegians – New Day
- Ted Gärdestad – Upptåg (#1 Sweden)
- Carita Holmström – Toinen Levy
- Knutsen & Ludvigsen – Knutsen og Ludvigsen nr. 3 – Tut
- Lillebjørn Nilsen – ...og Fia hadde sko

== Eurovision Song Contest ==
- Finland in the Eurovision Song Contest 1974
- Norway in the Eurovision Song Contest 1974
- Sweden in the Eurovision Song Contest 1974

== Film and television music ==
- Bent Fabricius-Bjerre – Olsenbanden møter Kongen & Knekten

== Musical films ==
- Dunderklumpen!, with music by Toots Thielemans
- Knutsen & Ludvigsen, with music by Øystein Dolmen & Gustav Lorentzen

== Births ==
- 17 January – Jaakko Kuusisto, Finnish violinist, conductor and composer (died 2022)
- 17 April – Mikael Åkerfeldt, Swedish heavy metal musician
- 13 June – Selma Björnsdóttir, Icelandic singer
- 31 October – Natasja Saad, Danish rapper and singer (died 2007)

== Deaths ==
- 15 February – Kurt Atterberg, Swedish composer (born 1887)
- 20 February – David Monrad Johansen, Norwegian composer (born 1888)
- 14 June – Knud Jeppesen, Danish musicologist and composer (born 1892)
- 31 October – Olav Gurvin, Norwegian conductor and composer (born 1893)
- 23 November – Páll Ísólfsson, Icelandic musician, conductor and composer, first director of the Reykjavík School of Music (born 1893)
- 26 December – Knudåge Riisager, Danish composer (born 1897)

== See also ==
- 1974 in Denmark
- 1974 in Iceland
- 1974 in Norwegian music
- 1974 in Sweden
