= 1888 in Nordic music =

The following is a list of notable events that occurred in the year 1888 in Nordic music.

== Events ==
- 1 January – Norwegian composer Edvard Grieg and Russian composer Pyotr Ilyich Tchaikovsky meet for the first time, in Leipzig.
- 5 February – Carl Nielsen's String Quartet No. 1 is premiered in the smaller hall of the Odd Fellows Mansion, Copenhagen.
- 17 September – Carl Nielsen's Suite for String Orchestra is premiered at Tivoli Gardens in Copenhagen.
- unknown date – Alexandra Ahnger begins teaching singing privately.

== New works ==
- Edvard Grieg
  - Lyric Pieces for Piano, Book IV
  - Peer Gynt Suite No. 1 Op. 46 (created from his earlier work Peer Gynt
- Johan Peter Emilius Hartmann – Dante Overture, Op. 85
- Gustav Helsted – Romance for Violin and Orchestra, Op. 11
- C. F. E. Horneman – Aladdin (opera)
- Carl Nielsen – Suite for String Orchestra
- Jean Sibelius – Piano Trio in C major

== Popular music ==
- Bror Beckman – " Kammaren sitter kaplanens vif / Im Kämmerlein wacht des Kapplanen Weib"

== Births ==
- 26 January – Lisa Steier, Swedish ballerina (died 1928)
- 8 November – David Monrad Johansen, Norwegian composer (died 1974).

== Deaths ==
- 7 February – Aurore von Haxthausen, Swedish pianist, composer and writer (born 1830)
- 22 June – Edmund Neupert, Norwegian pianist and composer (born 1842)
- 9 December – Robert William Otto Allen, Danish pianist, conductor and composer (born 1852)

== See also ==
- 1880s in Danish music
- 1888 in Norwegian music
- 1888 in Sweden
