= 1887 in Nordic music =

The following is a list of notable events that occurred in the year 1887 in Nordic music.

== Events ==
- 17 September – Danish composer Carl Nielsen plays the violin at Tivoli Concert Hall in Copenhagen at the premiere of his own Andante tranquillo e Scherzo for strings.
- 29 December – Ivar Hallström's "fairy play" Per Svinaherde receives its premiere at the Stockholm Opera House.
- unknown date
  - Danish conductor and composer Frederik Rung sets up the Madrigal choir at the Cecilia Association (Caeciliaforening) of Copenhagen.
  - Danish poet Holger Drachmann meets cabaret singer Amanda Nielsen, who becomes his muse.
  - Norwegian organist, music teacher and critic Catharinus Elling graduates from the Hochschule für Musik in Berlin, Germany.

== New works ==
- Catharinus Elling – Valse capriser
- Edvard Grieg – Third Sonata for Violin and Piano in C minor, opus 45 (written at Troldhaugen the previous autumn)
- Jean Sibelius – Piano Trio in D major

== Popular music ==
- Laura Netzel – "Blomman"
- Wilhelm Peterson-Berger – "Irmelin"

== Births ==
- 17 February – Leevi Madetoja, Finnish conductor, composer and teacher (died 1947)
- 23 February – Oskar Lindberg, Swedish composer (died 1955)
- 3 April – Edvard Bræin, Norwegian organist, conductor and composer (died 1957)
- 30 May – Emil Reesen, Danish pianist, conductor, composer and musical director (died 1964)
- 4 June – Irma Tervani, Finnish operatic contralto (died 1936)
- 25 August – Fartein Valen, Norwegian composer (died 1952)
- 12 December – Kurt Atterberg, Swedish composer, also an engineer (died 1974)

== Deaths ==
- 7 February – Hanna Brooman, Swedish composer and teacher (born 1809)
- 7 May – Alette Due, Norwegian singer and composer (born 1812)
- 23 May – Ludvig Mathias Lindeman, Norwegian composer (born 1812)
- 15 August – Hedvig Willman, Swedish opera singer (born 1841)
- 2 November – Jenny Lind, Swedish soprano called "the Swedish Nightingale" (born 1820)

== See also ==
- 1880s in Danish music
- 1887 in Norwegian music
- 1887 in Sweden
