= 1893 in Nordic music =

The following is a list of notable events that occurred in the year 1893 in Nordic music.

== Events ==
- unknown date
  - Jean Sibelius begins work on his Lemminkäinen Suite.
  - Swedish poet and composer Gunnar Wennerberg is elected to the upper house of the Riksdag.
  - Gustaf Hägg is permanently appointed to the position of organist at Klara Church, Stockholm.

== New works ==
- Gustaf Hägg – La Coquette: Valse de salon, Op. 10
- Johan Halvorsen – Entry March of the Boyars
- Jean Sibelius
  - 6 Impromptus, Op. 5
  - Karelia Suite
  - Piano Sonata in F major
- Sara Wennerberg-Reuter – Trio [for 2 violins and piano]

== Popular music ==
- Alice Tegnér – "Gläns över sjö och strand"

== Births ==
- 4 July – Finn Bø, Norwegian songwriter (died 1962)
- 28 July – Rued Langgaard, Danish organist and composer (died 1952)
- 13 December – Olav Gurvin, musicologist and academic (died 1974)

== Deaths ==
- 12 August – Christian Henrik Glass, Danish organist, pianist and composer (born 1821)
- 13 September – Carl Ludvig Gerlach, Danish opera singer and composer (born 1832)
- 4 December - Maria Westberg, Swedish ballerina (born 1853)

== See also ==
- 1893 in Denmark
- 1893 in Norwegian music
- 1893 in Sweden
- 1893 in Iceland
