= 1958 in Nordic music =

The following is a list of notable events and compositions of the year 1958 in Nordic music.

== Events ==
- 12 March – The 3rd Eurovision Song Contest is held in the Netherlands, and for the first time two Scandinavian countries are represented. Sweden, represented by Alice Babs, finishes in 4th place, and Denmark's Raquel Rastenni is 8th.
- May – The 6th Bergen International Festival is held in Bergen, Norway.

== New works ==
- Lars-Erik Larsson – Concertino for trumpet and string orchestra
- Per Nørgård – Constellations, for strings
- Gösta Nystroem – Herr Arnes Penningar (opera)
- Allan Pettersson – Concerto for Strings No. 3

== Popular music ==
- Erik Leth & Sven Gyldmark – "Er du dus med himlens fugle"
- Vidar Sandbeck – "Pengegaloppen"

== New recordings ==
- Monica Zetterlund – Swedish Sensation

== Film music ==
- Sven Gyldmark – Styrmand Karlsen
- Sven Rüno – Åsa-Nisse i kronans kläder

== Musical films ==
- Musik ombord, starring Alice Babs

== Births ==
- 25 February – Eva Johansson, Danish operatic soprano
- 30 May – Marie Fredriksson, Swedish singer (died 2019)
- 30 June
  - Kalevi Kiviniemi, Finnish organist (died 2024)
  - Esa-Pekka Salonen, Finnish conductor and composer
- 18 July – Bent Sørensen, Danish composer
- 27 July – Kimmo Hakola, Finnish composer

== Deaths ==
- 18 January – Maja Flagstad, Norwegian pianist, choral conductor, and répétiteur (born 1871)
- 23 June – Armas Järnefelt, Finnish-Swedish conductor and composer (born 1869)
- 28 September – Aarre Merikanto, Finnish composer (born 1893)
- 20 November – Arne Svendsen, Norwegian songwriter, folk poet and revue writer (born 1884)

== See also ==
- 1958 in Denmark
- 1958 in Iceland
- 1958 in Norwegian music
- 1958 in Sweden
