= Ruth Katz =

Israeli musicologist

- רות כ"ץ
- Born: 1927 (age 98–99)
- Occupations: Musicologist; Professor emerita
- Known for: Contributions to ethnomusicology, philosophy, and aesthetics of music
- Awards: Israel Prize (2012)

Ruth Katz (Hebrew: רות כ"ץ; born 1927) is an Israeli musicologist, a pioneer of academic musicology in Israel, professor emerita at the Hebrew University of Jerusalem. She has been a corresponding Member of the American Musicological Society since 2011. She was named laureate of the Israel State Prize in 2012.

Katz's work addresses ethnomusicology, philosophy and aesthetics of music, and music cognition. It is characterized by methodological sophistication, broad interdisciplinary perspectives and a synthetic view focusing on unveiling the ideational components. She is also concerned with the general historiography and sociology of culture and art, to aesthetics, and to ethnography and anthropology.

== Research ==
=== Western music: practice, theory, philosophy, society ===
Unveiling the ways in which the manifold forms of music and their surrounding historical worlds mutually constitute each other has been the underlying theme of Katz's work since her dissertation (1963), that differentiated between Western art music since 1600 from what preceded it in epistemological, sociological and culture-historical terms, challenging well-established views concerning the rise of opera. The dissertation linked the emergence of opera and related musico-dramatic forms in the early 17th century to the "Scientific Revolution" concomitantly under way throughout the West, presenting the former as expressions of a new music- aesthetic paradigm that emerged through "experiments" exploring the powers of music. On a more local level, Katz further attributed these developments to a 16th-century Italian tradition of proto-scientific, magic engagement with music, and to Italian literary and dramatic genres, thereby explaining why the operatic genre emerged in Italy rather than elsewhere, even though similar ideational developments took place throughout the West. Formulating the new paradigm thus in music-aesthetic terms, Katz applied it to the development of the operatic medium until the 1980s.

Katz's work on the constituting interactions between aesthetic ideas and the development of musical styles continued in her Contemplating Music (1987-1991; with Carl Dahlhaus), a four-volume annotated anthology containing texts by major thinkers, and mapping the main topics of Western philosophy of music from Classical Greece to the 20th century.

Continuing her exploration of the thinking embedded in the concrete musical phenomenon in “History as ‘Compliance’: The Development of Western Musical Notation in the Light of Goodman’s Requirements“, (1992), Katz connected analytical philosopher Nelson Goodman's theory of the "Languages of Art" to the 500-year-long process that historically produced Western musical notation.

The twin volumes Tuning the Mind and The Arts in Mind (2003, with Ruth HaCohen) presented the ideational components embedded in the language of Western art music of the 17th and 18th centuries, that eventually culminated in the Classical style. Using the perspectives of both the thought of late-18th-century English men of letters, and modern cognitive science, these volumes analyze the music as "sense formations without predication", in terms of the contemporary styles and genres, and via an examination of music's relation to its "sister arts", at the same time exposing the debt owed by present-day cognitive theories to historical aesthetic ideas and artistic practices.

A comprehensive synthesis of Katz's work on Western music appeared in her A Language of its Own: Sense and Meaning in the Making of Western Art Music (2009), a philosophical history of music examining Western art music in its entirety (10th to 20th centuries). By tracing the continuing dialogue between music and the theoretical and aesthetic discourse about it, as represented in music-theoretical writings throughout the centuries (that, in their turn, took part in the broader intellectual and cultural discourse of their time), Katz showed how the Western musical mentality, driven by an urge towards rationality, emerged from the vital interactions between intellectual production and musical creation, thereby explaining many of Western music's immanent distinctive properties, and offering, in a way, what may be considered a detailed elaboration of Max Weber's famous thesis concerning the rational basis of Western society. The book follows in detail the process whereby Western music developed into a system of signification without external reference ("a language that explains itself from within") culminating in the Classical style of the late 18th century, this as an expression of concomitant changes in intellectual and social history. The book then traces the process of Western music further, into the 19th and 20th centuries, in which it became the locus of epistemological innovation anticipating linguistic and cognitive theories. Finally, Katz shows the gradual disintegration, in the 20th century, of that self-referential system, the drive towards which had informed Western music for the entire second millennium.

=== Ethnomusicology: the Middle East and folk traditions in Israel/Palestine ===
Katz's ethnomusicological work focuses on folk music in Israel – Palestinian Arab folk singing, music of the different Jewish communities, and the Israeli composed "folksong" – this, too, with the aim of unveiling the constituting ideational components –be they universal-cognitive patterns or culture-specific schemes. Part of these studies was conducted in collaboration with Dalia Cohen, with whom Katz founded, in the 1950s, the Laboratory for Analysis of Vocal Information at the Hebrew University of Jerusalem, and led jointly, producing influential methodological and theoretical breakthroughs.

A turning point in Katz & Cohen's laboratory work was the development (in the mid 1950s) of the first model of the "Jerusalem melograph", an electronic apparatus transcribing orally-transmitted monophonic music as a continuous graph representing changes in pitch and loudness over time, thereby providing information that is not only precise but also independent of cultural, stylistic, and notational conventions concerning three out of the four psycho-acoustic parameters (pitch, duration and loudness; timbre was added later). The melograph was at the base of all of Katz and Cohen's ethnomusicological work, since it made it possible to unveil latent principles regulating musical practice that are not expressed in a musical theory, cannot be extracted aurally or through use of available forms of notation (most of the work concerned oral traditions, to begin with), and of which not only researchers but also the carriers of the tradition were mostly unaware. Similar apparati were invented concomitantly but independently in Norway (Olav Gurvin) and the USA (Charles Seeger), but the processing of the findings of the Jerusalem melograph was accompanied by new, more culturally-independent theoretical categories, that proved highly fruitful not only for the specific musical traditions, but also for comparative ethnomusicological research in general, becoming widely accepted in the field, with implications for music-cognition research.

The melograph was eventually integrated into computerized methodologies, leading to further elaboration and to its application beyond ethnomusicology: e.g. in the study of Hebrew prosody, or in Western music performance studies.

Katz & Cohen’s monumental Palestinian Arab Music: Latent and Manifest “Theory” of a Maqām Tradition in Practice (2005) is a summary of 40 years of collaborative research into the vocal folk music of the Arabs in Israel. In addition to many findings concerning the particular tradition and its methodological and analytical sophistication, the book engages fundamental questions of ethnomusicology and general anthropology concerning the meaning of modal frameworks, the combination of text and music appearing as a-priori fusions, the dynamic between continuity and change in living oral traditions and the role of the individual creative artist therein, or how to assess authenticity.

Katz's other ethnomusicological research addressed inter alia the music of the Samaritans (1974), in which she identified a case of "oral group notation"' and a connection to the medieval Christian Neannoe-Ninnua, showing that both are rooted in earlier Hebrew traditions. In other studies she examined the singing of Baqqashot by the Aleppo Jews (1968; 1970), applying the notion of mannerism (until then applied mainly to Western art), as an index of cultural change. Both cases served Katz as test cases of the fundamental anthropological question concerning the reliability of oral traditions, a subject that continued to occupy her in various interdisciplinary international forums, as well as in her book The Lachmann Problem (2004), about Robert Lachmann, a pioneer of comparative musicology who fled to Palestine from Nazi Germany. The book weaves together the history of the discipline, from its origins as "comparative musicology" in Germany of the early 1900s and the Weimar Republic with the history of the Yishuv in British-mandate Palestine and of the Hebrew University of Jerusalem.

== Selected works ==
=== Books ===
- The Origins of Opera: The Relevance Social of and Cultural Factors to the Establishment of a Musical Institution, Ph.D. Dissertation, Columbia University, 1963.
- The Israeli Folksong: A Methodological Example of Computer Analysis of Monophonic Music, Jerusalem: Magnes Press, 1970 (with Dalia Cohen).
- Divining the Power of Music, Aesthetic Theory and the Origin of Opera, New York: Pendragon Press, 1986.
- Contemplating Music (Sources in the aesthetic of music, selected, edited, annotated and introduced, with original translations, in four volumes), New York: Pendragon Press, 1987-1991 (with Carl Dahlhaus).Vol. I Substance (1987); Vol. II Import (1989); Vol. III Essence (1991);Vol. IV Community of Discourse (1991).
- The Powers of Music, New Jersey: Transaction Publishers, Rutgers University, 1994 (paperback edition of Divining the Powers of Music, revised with a new introduction).
- Tuning the Mind, New Jersey: Transaction Publishers, Rutgers University, 2003 (with Ruth HaCohen).
- The Arts in Mind, New Jersey: Transaction Publishers, Rutgers University, 2003 (with Ruth HaCohen).
- "The Lachmann Problem": An Unsung Chapter in Comparative Musicology, Jerusalem: Magnes Press, 2004.
- Palestinian Arab Music: Latent and Manifest “Theory” of a Maqām Tradition in Practice, Chicago: University of Chicago Press, 2005 (with Dalia Cohen).
- A Language of its Own: Sense and Meaning in the Making of Western Art Music. Chicago: University of Chicago Press, 2009; paperback edition 2013.
- The Discursive March of Thought: An Interdisciplinary Roadmap, New York: Israel Academic Press, 2015.

=== Selected articles ===
- “Explorations in the Music of the Samaritans: An Illustration of the Utility of Graphic-Notation“, Ethnomusicology IV, 1960 (with Dalia Cohen).
- “The Melograph in Ethno-musicological Studies”, Ariel, XXI, 1967 (with Dalia Cohen).
- “The Singing of Baqqashot by Aleppo Jews: A Study in Musical Acculturation”, Acta Musicologica, XL, 1968.
- “Mannerism and Cultural Change: An Ethno-musicological Example”, Current Anthropology, XI, 1970.
- “The Egalitarian Waltz”, Comparative Studies in Society and History, XV, 1973.
- “Quantitative Analyses of Monophonic Music: Towards a More Precise Definition of Style with the Aid of the Computer”, Orbis Musicae, II (with Dalia Cohen).
- “On ‘Nonsense’ Syllables as Oral Group Notation: Evidence for Werner’s Neannoe-Ninnua Theory“, Musical Quarterly, LX, 1974.
- “The Reliability of Oral Transmission: The Case of Samaritan Music”, Yuval, III, 1974.
- “The Interdependence of Notation Systems and Musical Information”, Yearbook of the International Folk Music Council, XI, 1979 (with Dalia Cohen).
- “Waltz Interlude”, The Imperial Style: Fashions of the Habsburg Era, New York: The Metropolitan Museum of Art, 1980.
- “The Contribution of Music to the Illumination of Ambiguity”, Molad, 1982 (Hebrew).
- “Collective ‘Problem-Solving’ in the History of Music: The Case of the Camerata”, Journal of the History of Ideas, XLV, 1984.
- “Societal Codes for Responding to Dissent“, in W. Bennis et al., eds., The Planning of Change (4th edition), New York: Holt, Rinehart and Winston, 1985.
- “Exemplification and the Limits of ‘Correctness’: The Implicit Methodology of Idelsohn’s ‘Thesaurus’“, Yuval, IV, 1985.
- “Ut Musica Poesis: The Crystallization of the Conception Concerning Cognitive Processes and ‘Well Made Worlds’“, in H. Danuser et al., eds., Das musikalische Kunstwerk, Berlin: Laaber 1988 (with Ruth HaCohen).
- “Concerning the Relationships Among the Arts: The 18th-Century Legacy to the 19th Century“, in Peter Andrasche and Edelgard Spaude, eds., Welttheater, Rombach Verlag, 1992 (with Ruth HaCohen).
- “History as ‘Compliance’: The Development of Western Musical Notation in the Light of Goodman’s Requirements“, in Mary Douglas, ed.: How Classification Works: Nelson Goodman among the Social Scientists, Edinburgh: Edinburgh University Press, 1992.
- “Separating Sense from Meaning: On Musical Thought and Cognitive Theory“, Paul F. Lazarsfeld Memorial Lecture, Columbia University, 1992.
- “Musico-Poetic Arabic Tradition: A Comparison between the Oral-Palestinian and the Written Medieval Spanish”, Revista de Musicologia, vol. XVI, no. 4, 1993 (with Dalia Cohen).
- “Structural Aspects of Musico-Poetic Genres in Practice and of the Medieval Hebrew Muwassah”, Proceedings of the Eleventh World Congress Jewish Studies, Jerusalem, 1994 (with Dalia Cohen).
- "Attitudes to the Time Axis and Cognitive Constraints: The Case of Arabic Vocal-Folk-Music“, Proceedings of the European Society for the Cognitive Sciences of Music, 1994 (with Dalia Cohen).
- “Why Music? Jews and the Commitment to Modernity“, in S. Volkov, ed., The Jews and Modernity, Munich: Historisches Kolleg, 1995.
- “McLuhan: Where Did He Come From, Where Did He Disappear?” Canadian Journal of Communication, 23, 1998; also in French, Quaderni (with Elihu Katz).
- “Wagner and the Jewish Commitment to Modernity“, The Sterosta Lectures, Jerusalem: The Hebrew University, 1984.
- “Melograph“, New Grove Dictionary of Music (with Dalia Cohen).
- “The Waltz and the Public Sphere“, in J. Lautman & B.P. Lecuyer, eds., Paul Lazarsfeld (1901-1975): La sociologie de Vienne à New York, Paris: L’Harmattan, 1998.
- “The Melisma as a Musical Parameter: Characterizing Oriental Ethnic Groups in Israel” (in Hebrew), Pe’amim, 77, 1999 (with Dalia Cohen).
- “‘Authenticity,’ ‘Interpretation,’ and ‘Practice’: Probing Their Limits“, in David Greet, ed., Musicology and Sister Disciplines: Past, Present and Future, Oxford: Oxford University Press, 2000.
- “Universal Constraints Concerning the Choice of Stylistic Rules in Various Cultures“, European Meetings in Ethnomusicology, vol. VIII, 2001 (with Dalia Cohen).
- “Rhythmic Patterns Reflecting Cognitive Constraints and Aesthetic Ideals“, Journal of New Music Research, vol. 37, no. 1 (with Dalia Cohen)
- “Life and Death among the Binaries: A contribution to the symposium on Jeffrey Alexander’s essay on the Holocaust” (with Elihu Katz). New York: Oxford University Press, 2009.
