= Howard P. Segal =

American historian (1948–2020)

- Born: Howard Paul Segal; July 15, 1948; Philadelphia, Pennsylvania, U.S.
- Died: November 9, 2020 (aged 72)
- Education: Franklin and Marshall College (BA); Princeton University (MA, PhD)
- Occupation: Historian
- Spouse: Deborah D. Rogers (m. 1988)
- Children: 2
- Writing career
- Subjects: History of American technology, utopianism
- Notable work: Technological Utopianism in American Culture

Howard Paul Segal (July 15, 1948 – November 9, 2020) was an American historian who was a professor of history at the University of Maine. Specializing in the history of American technology and American utopianism, he wrote well over 200 articles and authored or edited eight books including Technology and Utopia, Technology, Pessimism, and Post-Modernism (coedited with Yaron Ezrahi and Everett Mendelsohn); Future Imperfect: The Mixed Blessings of Technology in America; Utopias: A Brief History; Technology in America (with Alan I Marcus); Technological Utopianism in American Culture; and Recasting the Machine Age.

According to historian of technology Alan I Marcus, Segal was attracted to utopias "because they suggested a perfectibility that he wanted to help make true. His work labored to make institutions, governments, and other social agencies continually strive to approach that noble goal."

At the heart of almost everything that Segal wrote was technology, which could be used for good or evil. Marcus explains that precisely because "technology often had unintended consequences, Segal cherished his utopian-inspiring institutions. Their representatives could be entrusted to redress wrongs, alter course, and rein in unexpected ramifications that could cause harm."

== Early life and education ==
Segal attended Franklin & Marshall College, where he completed his B.A. degree in 1970 and was awarded the Zimmerman Graduate Fellowship in History. He received his MA and PhD (1975) degrees from Princeton University. His doctoral thesis, which became his first book, was titled Technological Utopianism and American Culture, 1830-1940.

== Career ==
Segal's early teaching appointments were visiting instructor at Franklin and Marshall College; Taft Postdoctoral Fellow and lecturer, University of Cincinnati; Killam Postdoctoral Fellow and lecturer at Dalhousie University in Halifax, Nova Scotia; Assistant Professor at University of Michigan; and Mellon Faculty Fellow at Harvard University.

By 1986, he had entered the University of Maine's History Department as an assistant professor and was promoted to associate professor in 1988 and professor in 1992. He married Deborah D. Rogers, also a professor at the University of Maine, on 1988. He was elected Bird & Bird Professor of History during two periods at the University of Maine, from 1996 to 2005 and 2010 to 2015. He was periodically interviewed on radio and television to discuss current events in historical perspective.

== Selected works ==
=== Books ===
- Segal, H.P. (2006). Technology and Utopia. Johns Hopkins University Press
- Alan I Marcus, & Segal, H. (1989). Technology in America: A Brief History. Harcourt Brace Jovanovich.
  - Named An Outstanding Academic Book for 1989 by Choice.
  - 2nd Ed., Revised and Expanded (Harcourt Brace and Co., 1999)
  - 3rd. Ed. Revised and Expanded (MacMillan International/Bedford/St. Martin, 2018)
- Segal, H. P. (1994). Future Imperfect: The Mixed Blessings of Technology in America. Univ of Massachusetts Press.
- Ezrahi, Y., Mendelsohn, E., Segal, H. P., (Eds.). (1994). Technology, Pessimism, and Postmodernism (Vol. 17). Springer Science & Business Media.
- Segal, H. P. (2005). Technological Utopianism in American Culture. Syracuse University Press.
- Segal, H. P. (2008). Recasting the Machine Age: Henry Ford's Village Industries. Univ of Massachusetts Press.
  - Received the Henry Ford Heritage Association Annual Book Award for Best Book on Henry Ford’s Life and Legacy in 2009.
- Segal, H. P. (2012). Utopias: A Brief History from Ancient Writings to Virtual Communities (Vol. 47). John Wiley & Sons.
- Segal, H.P., ed. and intro, Harold Loeb's Life in a Technocracy: What it Might be Like. Syracuse University Press, 1996

== Awards and honors ==
- 2015: Society for Utopian Studies' Lyman Tower Sargent Award for Career Distinguished Scholarship.
