= Alan I. Marcus =

American historian of science and technology (born 1949)

- Born: August 15, 1949 (age 77); Red Bank, New Jersey, U.S.
- Occupations: Historian of science and technology

Academic background
- Education: University of Wisconsin–Madison (BA 1972); University of Cincinnati (MA 1975, PhD 1979)

Academic work
- Discipline: Historian
- Sub-discipline: History of technology; History of medicine; History of agriculture; Intellectual history
- Institutions: Iowa State University (1980–2005); Mississippi State University (2005–)

Alan I Marcus (born August 15, 1949) is an American historian of science and technology. He is William L. Giles Distinguished Professor at Mississippi State University, where he started as the head of the history department in 2005 after 25 years at Iowa State University. He is known as the author of the history textbook Technology in America: A Brief Introduction (1st edition 1989, with Howard P. Segal; 2nd ed. 1999; 3rd ed. 2018) as well as other works focusing on the history of technology, of science, of medicine, and of agriculture and other works on intellectual history.

== Early life and education ==
Marcus was born August 15, 1949, in Red Bank, New Jersey. He received his B.A. from the University of Wisconsin–Madison in 1972 and his M.A. (1975) and Ph.D. (1979) from the University of Cincinnati.

== Career ==
Marcus was a professor of history at Iowa State University from 1980 to 2005. He moved to Mississippi State University (MSU) in 2005 to become head of their history department, and there he rose to a named chair and distinguished professorship, William L. Giles Distinguished Professor, in 2016. At MSU, as head of the history department, he established an African American Studies program, a Graduate Diversity Certificate Program, and a Symposium for History Undergraduate Research.

He is the author of the history textbook Technology in America: A Brief Introduction (1st edition 1989, with Howard P. Segal; 2nd ed. 1999; 3rd ed. 2018) as well as other works focusing on the history of technology, of science, of medicine, and of agriculture and other works on intellectual history. His book Malignant Growth: Creating the Modern Cancer Research Establishment, 1875-1915 was published in 2018 by the University of Alabama Press; Land of Milk and Money: The Creation of the Southern Dairy Industry was published in 2021.

He has received numerous awards and honors throughout his academic career, including the Agricultural History Society's Gladys L. Baker Award for lifetime achievement in 2020. In 1990–1991, he was president of the Midwest Junto for the History of Science. He was treasurer of the Agricultural History Society 2010–2019 and became a fellow of the society in 2016.

== Selected works ==
- Marcus, Alan I (1985). Agricultural Science and the Quest for Legitimacy: Farmers, Agricultural Colleges, and Experiment Stations, 1870-1890. Iowa State University Press. ISBN 978-0813800837.
- Marcus, Alan I; Segal, Howard P. (1989). Technology in America: A Brief History (1st ed.). Harcourt Brace Jovanovich. ISBN 978-0155897625.
  - 2nd edition 1999, revised and expanded. Harcourt Brace. ISBN 978-0155055315.
  - 3rd edition 2018, further revised and expanded. McMillian International/Bedford/St. Martin. ISBN 978-1137334855.
- Marcus, Alan I (1991). Plague of Strangers: Social Groups and the Origins of City Services in Cincinnati, 1819–1870. Urban Life and Urban Landscape. Ohio State University Press. ISBN 978-0814205501.
- Marcus, Alan I (2018). Malignant Growth: Creating the Modern Cancer Research Establishment, 1875–1915. University of Alabama Press. ISBN 978-0817319793.
- Marcus, Alan I (2023). Land of Milk and Money: The Creation of the Southern Dairy Industry. Louisiana State University Press. ISBN 978-0807176054.
