= Robert William Otto Allen =

Danish pianist, composer and conductor

Robert William Otto Allen (18 September 1852 – 9 December 1888) was a Danish pianist, composer and conductor. He was the brother of conductor Georg Frederik Ferdinand Allen.

He trained at the Royal Academy of Music as a student of Edmund Neupert. From the late 1870s he was a music teacher in Aarhus and in 1885 he became organist at Århus Cathedral. He was a frequent contributor to the Aarhus music scene both as a pianist, as conductor and as a composer.

Notable compositions include Koncertouverture i G-Dur (1881), Ouverture til Dina (1886) and Løft dit hoved, du raske gut (1883).
