= 1893 in Norwegian music =

The following is a list of notable events and releases of the year 1893 in Norwegian music.

== Births ==
July

- 4 – Finn Bø, songwriter, revue writer, playwright, journalist and theatre critic (died 1962).

December

- 13 – Olav Gurvin, musicologist and Professor at the University of Oslo (died 1974).

== See also ==
- 1893 in Norway
- Music of Norway
