= Deborah D. Rogers =

American literary scholar (born 1953)

Deborah D. Rogers (born 1953) is an American literary scholar. She works at the University of Maine. She has published four scholarly books, one about the eighteenth-century bookseller John Almon and three about eighteenth-century Gothic fiction and the novelist Ann Radcliffe. She also edited two editions for Signet Classics, and co-edited a collection of essays about the University of Maine.

== Biography ==
Deborah Dee Rogers was born in Massachusetts in 1953 to Marvin and Marilyn Rogers. She had two brothers. The family moved to Wayne, New Jersey, in 1966. Her father worked in the pharmaceutical industry, eventually becoming a director at American Cyanamid Company.

Rogers earned a B.A. from Rutgers University, an M.A. from the University of California, Berkeley, and an M.Phil and Ph.D. from Columbia University. She began her academic career at the University of Maine in Orono in 1982, where she became an associate professor in 1990 and a full professor in 1996.

In 1988, she married Howard Segal, a professor of history also at the University of Maine. She kept her maiden name, and they had two children with Segal's last name. Segal died in 2020, and Rogers assisted in completing his last posthumous publication, Becoming Modern: The University of Maine, 1965–2015 (2023), a collection of essays he was editing with Ann Acheson.

== Writing ==
Rogers's first monograph, Bookseller as Rogue: John Almon and the Politics of Eighteenth-Century Publishing was published in 1986 to mixed reviews. This book presents the writer and publisher John Almon as a "rogue" for his opportunistic business decisions, and uses his career as an example of how politics affected booksellers in the period. Reviewers praised her identification of two new manuscript archives with material related to Almon, and the book's bibliography of his publications. However, they found the book's analysis of these materials lacking, particularly criticizing the omission of Almon's bookselling activities, and Rogers's casual tone.

Her next two books focused on the eighteenth-century Gothic writer Ann Radcliffe. Her book The Critical Response to Ann Radcliffe (1994) collected and examined commentary about Radcliffe, including reviews, scholarly articles, and personal letters. It was published while Radcliffe was experiencing a revitalization of scholarly interest, and provides source material demonstrating her mixed and frequently-changing reputation since the eighteenth century. Rogers' third scholarly book, Ann Radcliffe: A Bio-Bibliography (1996), includes bibliographic information about every work published by or about Radcliffe from 1789 to 1995, including imitations, adaptations, parodies, and works spuriously attributed to Radcliffe. It also presents the first biography of Radcliffe to include information from her commonplace book, which had previously been ignored. Many previous biographies debated sensationalist rumors that Radcliffe had been driven to madness and death by her Gothic writing, without seeking documentary evidence. Rogers instead uses Radcliffe's commonplace book to describe the details of Radcliffe's treatment for asthma and digestive problems in the last years of her life.

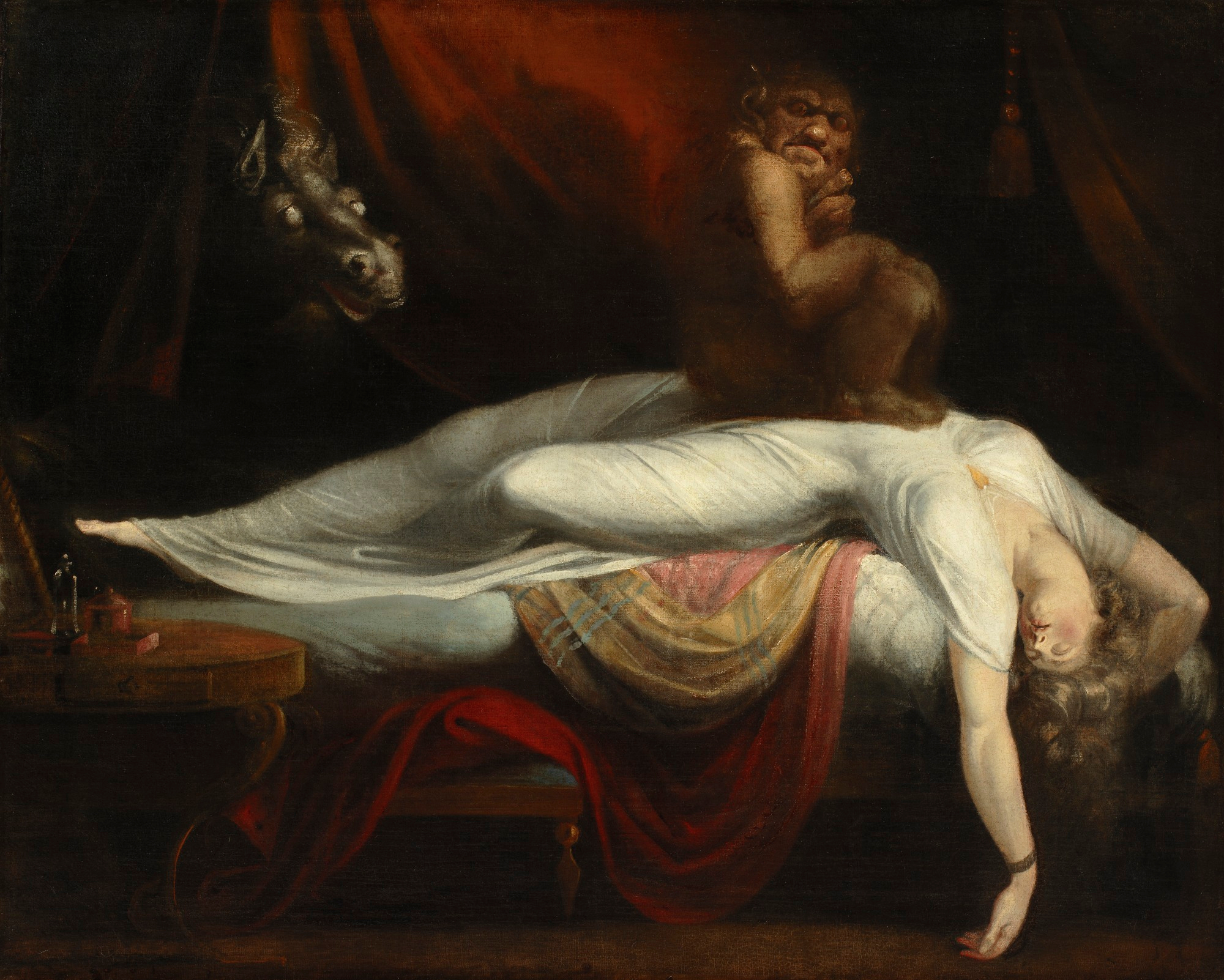
Henry Fuseli's painting The Nightmare (1781) was on the cover of Two Gothic Classics by Women, edited by Rogers

In 1995, Rogers edited two books for Signet Classics. The first, an edition of Rob Roy (1817) by Walter Scott, coincided with the release of the 1995 film adaptation and featured Liam Neeson and Jessica Lange on the cover. The second, published as Two Gothic Classics by Women, combined Northanger Abbey (1818) by Jane Austen and The Italian (1796) by Ann Radcliffe. Its cover featured Henry Fuseli's painting "The Nightmare" (1781). Northanger Abbey was written as a parody of Ann Radcliffe's Gothic novels, especially Radcliffe's The Mysteries of Udolpho (1794); Rogers chose to pair Northanger Abbey with The Italian rather than Udolpho because she considered The Italian "the most readable and accomplished of Radcliffe's oeuvre".

Rogers's fourth monograph, titled The Matrophobic Gothic and Its Legacy: Sacrificing Mothers in the Novel and in Popular Culture, was published in 2007. It includes chapters on Radcliffe's critical reception and commonplace book, Northanger Abbey, and Rob Roy, which she discussed in her previous works. It also includes a chapter on Pamela (1740) by Samuel Richardson, a chapter on the medical complications of childbirth described in midwife manuals, and a section on modern television soap operas. The book defines matrophobia as the "fear of mothers," "fear of becoming a mother," and "fear of identification with and separation from the maternal body", and argues that patriarchal culture causes women's relationships with each other to be driven by a metaphorical matrophobia. Rogers particularly criticizes anti-maternalism in feminist and psychoanalytic theorists. The final section on soap operas argues that the fragmented narrative structure of daytime television also reinforces patriarchal values.

== Bibliography ==
=== Monographs ===
- Bookseller as Rogue: John Almon and the Politics of Eighteenth-Century Publishing. New York: Peter Lang, 1986.
- The Critical Response to Ann Radcliffe. Westport, CT and London: Greenwood Press, 1994.
- Ann Radcliffe: A Bio-Bibliography. Westport, CT and London: Greenwood Press, 1996.
- The Matrophobic Gothic and Its Legacy: Sacrificing Mothers in the Novel and in Popular Culture. New York: Peter Lang, 2007.

=== Edited works ===
- Rob Roy. New York: Signet Classics, 1995.
- Two Gothic Classics by Women. New York: Signet Classics, 1995.
- (with Howard Segal and Ann Acheson) Becoming Modern: The University of Maine, 1965–2015. Orono, Maine: University of Maine Press, 2023.
