= HaAyin HaShevi'it =

Israeli media watchdog organization

HaAyin HaShevi'it (Hebrew: העין השביעית, lit. The Seventh Eye) is an Israeli media watchdog and investigative outlet that reports on and critiques the country's media. It was founded in 1996 as a bimonthly print journal of the Israel Democracy Institute, became an online publication in 2008 and has been independent of the institute since 2015; since 2021 it has been operated by the reader-funded outlet Shakuf, as part of the media group "The Independent Press". Its reporting focuses on covert advertising, media ownership, political pressure on the press and freedom of the press in Israel, including government legislation and regulation affecting the media; its staff and reports have been cited by international media and press-freedom organisations such as Reporters Without Borders in coverage of the state of press freedom in the country.

In 2023 its three staff journalists received the Sokolov Award, Israel's most prestigious journalism prize; it was the first time the award went to an independent media outlet. Foreign Policy has described it as Israel's "most prominent media watchdog", while right-leaning critics have accused it of a left-wing slant and have questioned its funding.

== History ==
=== Print journal (1996-2008) ===
The Seventh Eye was launched in 1996 as a bimonthly journal funded by the Israel Democracy Institute. It was founded by Uzi Benziman of Haaretz, who edited it, together with Yaron Ezrahi, then a senior fellow at the institute; its editorial board consisted of working journalists from competing news organisations: Nahum Barnea of Yedioth Ahronoth, Carmit Guy of the Israel Broadcasting Authority and Rafi Mann of Maariv.

The name is a play on the Hebrew idiom "to guard with seven eyes" (i.e., to watch very closely). In the first issue, Benziman described the journal as a platform inviting the Israeli media to look at itself "with seven eyes". The 70th and final print issue appeared in January 2008, after which, for financial and editorial reasons, the publication moved entirely online. In 2007 the Israel Democracy Institute published Where Did We Go Wrong?, a 408-page anthology edited by Benziman and drawn from the more than a thousand articles, reports and columns the journal had published.

=== Online publication (2008-2020) ===
Between 2010 and 2012 the publication was partly funded by the College of Management Academic Studies. In November 2012 Hanoch Marmari, a former editor-in-chief of Haaretz, replaced Benziman as editor.

In early 2015, following budget cuts, the Israel Democracy Institute ended its support for the publication after nearly twenty years, and the site launched a crowdfunding campaign to secure its continued operation. Ezrahi later said that business figures on the institute's board had tried to pressure it into ending its support for the publication, a claim denied by a former board member he named, while the institute's vice-president for research, Mordechai Kremnitzer, said that as far as he knew no such pressure had been applied; the institute said the decision was part of a refocusing on its core research and reaffirmed a decision first taken in 2009. Its staff, together with several regular contributors, founded a nonprofit association, "HaAyin HaShevi'it – Independent, Investigative and Free Journalism", chaired by attorney Elad Man, which published the site from April 2015 until the end of 2020. Marmari stepped down in April 2015 and was succeeded by Shuki Tausig. From 2015 to 2020 the New Israel Fund made grants to the association and became its main funder; the Kohelet Policy Forum also donated during the 2015 campaign. In October 2015, having raised about NIS 400,000 of a NIS 1 million target, the site suspended its daily press review and warned that it might close at the end of the year; in January 2016 it was reported that it would continue to operate, with its staff working part-time at reduced pay. The association was later renamed the Institute for Contemporary Journalistic Thought.

=== Merger with Shakuf (2021–present) ===
In September 2020 The Seventh Eye announced that it would merge with Shakuf, an independent media outlet funded by small donations from the public, after the move was approved by the association's board and put to a vote among Shakuf's supporters. Since 1 January 2021 the publication has been operated under licence by Shakuf. In 2022 HaMakom HaKhi Ham BaGehinom ("The Hottest Place in Hell"), an independent investigative news site committed, in its own description, to democracy, equality and social justice, joined the group; under the terms of the merger, each outlet retains editorial independence while being managed jointly by Shakuf. The combined group, "The Independent Press" (העיתונות העצמאית), is funded entirely by recurring donations from readers.

== Content and projects ==
The site publishes news reports, investigations and opinion articles on the conduct of Israeli newsrooms, the structure of the media market and the influence of business and government interests on it, the penetration of advertising and propaganda into editorial content, and the state of freedom of expression and freedom of the press. It describes itself as unaffiliated with any political party. Selected reports are translated into English and published on its English-language site and in a dedicated English section of the Hebrew site; some have been republished by +972 Magazine. In recent years the publication has expanded beyond its original focus on media criticism: it has covered the climate crisis extensively, and Yossi Melman writes for it on security and intelligence affairs.

=== Press freedom and media legislation ===
One of the publication's stated aims is to monitor legislation and regulation affecting the Israeli media and to warn against government measures that restrict freedom of the press and freedom of expression. It maintains a running section on the sixth Netanyahu government's legislation concerning the media, and has reported on measures including the broadcasting law promoted by Communications Minister Shlomo Karhi, which the Supreme Court froze in October 2026, and the repeated extension of the "Al Jazeera law", which allows the government to restrict foreign broadcasters. It has also followed, in an ongoing series of reports, the Foreign Press Association's petition to the Supreme Court against the ban on foreign journalists entering the Gaza Strip, documenting the repeated extensions granted to the state and the postponements of the court's ruling.

Its staff have been quoted by international media on these issues. In 2025 Persico told the Reuters Institute that the Israeli media was under significant attack by the government, and described a bill expanding the government's power to close foreign media outlets as "extremist, stupid and destructive", warning that it could be extended to Israeli outlets that displeased the government and would have a deterrent effect on foreign journalists.

=== Channel 14 and "anti-media media" ===
The Seventh Eye has published a series of reports on Channel 14, a right-wing television news channel, which it describes as an example of "anti-media media", a concept coined by media researcher Ayala Panievsky, a member of the publication's executive committee. In 2026 Panievsky, Tausig and reporter Chen Egri published in Media Frames, the peer-reviewed journal of the Israel Communication Association, what they described as the first attempt to apply the concept empirically: a content analysis of 275 items from 24 of the channel's news and current-affairs programmes broadcast in 2024. The study found that uncritical echoing of government propaganda appeared in more than 40 per cent of the items examined. The journal also published responses, including an essay by Nissim Katz arguing that labelling Channel 14 as "anti-media media" risks excluding national, conservative and religious journalism from legitimate media discourse. The publication's monitoring of Channel 14 has been drawn on by international outlets, including Nieman Reports and Conspiracy Watch, and in June 2026, ahead of the Israeli election, Reporters Without Borders published a French translation of Egri's analysis of the channel, noting that the regulation of the media was a central issue in the campaign.

=== Covert advertising and influence campaigns ===
A long-running focus of the publication is the documentation of covert advertising – paid content presented as journalism – including content paid for by government bodies. Its investigations, several of them based on freedom-of-information requests, have reported on Israel Defense Forces advertorials in Israeli media and on payments by the Ministry of Strategic Affairs to media outlets, including the Yedioth Ahronoth group, for articles against the BDS movement. Its reporting on the ministry's covert influence unit, later known as Concert, was credited by The Guardian, which wrote in 2024 that much of what was previously known about the unit had first been reported by The Forward and The Seventh Eye, and that internal documents obtained by The Seventh Eye showed that many recipients of its funds were American Christian Zionist organisations. In 2026 The New York Times drew on government advertising records obtained by The Seventh Eye in an investigation of Israel's campaign around the Eurovision Song Contest. The publication has also investigated foreign influence operations, including a series by journalist Nick Kolyohin on the news site Walla that, according to its findings, was paid for by an organisation called the Russia-EU Communication Platform and edited to emphasise themes of interest to the Kremlin.

=== Other projects ===
- Subtext – a media-monitoring system developed by The Seventh Eye that combines artificial intelligence with human analysis to monitor the news and current-affairs broadcasts of Israel's main television channels. Ahead of the 2026 Israeli legislative election, the system was used to identify eleven false narratives expected in the campaign, which were published in a guide produced with support from CFI, Expertise France and the European Union, and to track how often they appeared on air.
- Representation Index – a joint project with the Jewish-Arab civil-equality organisation Sikkuy-Aufoq, launched in 2016, that tracks the share of Arab citizens among interviewees on Israel's main television and radio news programmes. At its launch, Arab citizens, about a fifth of Israel's population, made up around 2 per cent of interviewees; by 2025 their share had fallen to about 1 per cent.
- Free Media Index – a report on media freedom in Israel, published in December 2025 under the title On the Brink of Collapse, produced jointly with researchers from the Open University of Israel and published by the Van Leer Jerusalem Institute. Described by its authors as the first empirical attempt to quantify the state of the free press in Israel, it examines market concentration, the proximity of media organisations to politicians, defamation suits, violence against journalists and legislation aimed at restricting the media, and concludes that the Israeli media has reached a turning point that poses a real threat to its freedom and to its ability to act as a fourth estate.
- Map of Media Ownership in Israel – an ongoing project tracking the owners of Israeli media companies, cross-ownership and market concentration, first published in 2006 and updated in later editions, including in English.
- HaGanzach ("The Archive") – a database of primary documents on the media, including documents obtained by the publication, maintained with the Hatzlacha association. In 2022, in a suit brought by businessman Walter Soriano, a court held that a page of the archive collecting court documents concerning him was a database that had not been registered as required by law, and ordered the site to remove the documents concerning him; the ruling did not decide his separate defamation claim.
- Coverage of the Trial of Benjamin Netanyahu – the site has covered the trial, two of whose cases concern Israeli media outlets, focusing on what it reveals about Israeli journalism, including through a weekly podcast hosted by Persico and Tausig, originally titled Mishpat HaMo'lim ("The Publishers' Trial") and later renamed Koach LeHashchit ("Power to Corrupt").

== Reception ==
Foreign Policy has described The Seventh Eye as Israel's "most prominent media watchdog" and "the nation's leading media watchdog", and a 2022 Freedom House report noted its role in exposing Chinese government media influence in Israel. A 2021 report on Israel by the Center for Media, Data and Society at Central European University described it as "a leading independent and investigative magazine". Its reporting has been cited in a 2014 legal review by the Knesset Research and Information Center on regulating covert advertising, and at the Netanyahu trial, where in 2021 defence counsel Boaz Ben-Tzur referred to its analysis of the coverage on Walla while cross-examining the site's former chief executive, Ilan Yeshua. Its work has been cited by other outlets, including the Columbia Journalism Review and The Times of Israel, and its staff have been interviewed as experts on the Israeli media by outlets including Foreign Policy, CNN and WNYC's On the Media. Together with Shakuf, it is the Israeli partner of the Forbidden Stories consortium's Gaza Project, in which it helped identify the person behind "Gazawood", a pro-Israel X account accused of large-scale disinformation. In 2015, as the publication sought new funding, journalist Raviv Drucker wrote in Haaretz that it was practically the only permanent body in Israel analysing and criticising the ethics of the media, and called the institute's decision to stop funding it a terrible mistake, while acknowledging the criticism that it carried out too few investigations.

Right-leaning commentators have accused the publication of a left-wing slant. In 2015 Hillel Gershoni, writing in Mida, argued that its coverage of the government's natural gas framework was one-sided and that it treated supporters of the framework as serving business interests. In 2018 Akiva Bigman, writing in Israel Hayom, argued that after the New Israel Fund became its main funder – accounting, according to the Registrar of Associations, for about 75 per cent of its 2017 budget – the site had become more ideological and was selective in its criticism, sparing NIF-funded organisations; he also noted that the Dror Prize it received in 2016 was awarded by the NIF. The Seventh Eye responded that it did not hide the funding it received from the NIF and had published criticism of NIF-funded groups.

In 2026 the nonprofit association that formerly published the site reported to the Registrar of Associations donations from a foreign state entity totalling about NIS 557,000 from Canal France International (CFI), the French media-development agency, for a project titled "Empowering Palestinian and Israeli civil societies and media". Around the October 2026 election, a segment by Kolyohin on the Indian channel CNN-News18 named The Seventh Eye in a report on foreign funding and media influence in the Israeli election.

=== Lawsuits ===
In 2019 Walter Soriano, a London-based Israeli businessman described in the Israeli press as an associate of Netanyahu, sued The Seventh Eye and journalist Raviv Drucker for defamation over the site's coverage of a libel suit Soriano had filed against Drucker; the claim against the site amounted to NIS 420,000. In August 2023 the Tel Aviv Magistrate's Court dismissed the suit, which Soriano's lawyer Ilan Bombach had joined as a plaintiff, ruling that the site's reports were not defamatory and were in any case protected, and that the suit was a strategic lawsuit against public participation; it ordered the plaintiffs to pay NIS 84,000 in costs.

== Awards ==
- 2016 – Dror Prize for Social Change, funded by the New Israel Fund.
- 2023 – Sokolov Award for print journalism, awarded to Shuki Tausig, Oren Persico and Itamar Benzaquen. The award committee cited the publication's documentation of the spread of covert advertising, its coverage of the publishers' trial (Netanyahu's Cases 1000, 2000 and 4000) and its exposure of the "Yedioth Ahronoth method".

== Staff ==
As of 2026 the editorial staff consists of editor-in-chief Shuki Tausig; senior reporter Oren Persico; investigative reporter Itamar Benzaquen; reporter Chen Egri, who heads the Subtext project; and Knesset reporter Shabi Gatenio. Former editors-in-chief are Uzi Benziman (1996–2012) and Hanoch Marmari (2012–2015). Advisers to the print journal included Yaron Ezrahi and Mordechai Kremnitzer, and past regular contributors include Noa Yedlin, Yuval Dror, Anat Balint, Noam Yuran and Ido Kenan.
