= Yuval Dror =

Israeli sociologist, lecturer, writer

- יובל דרור
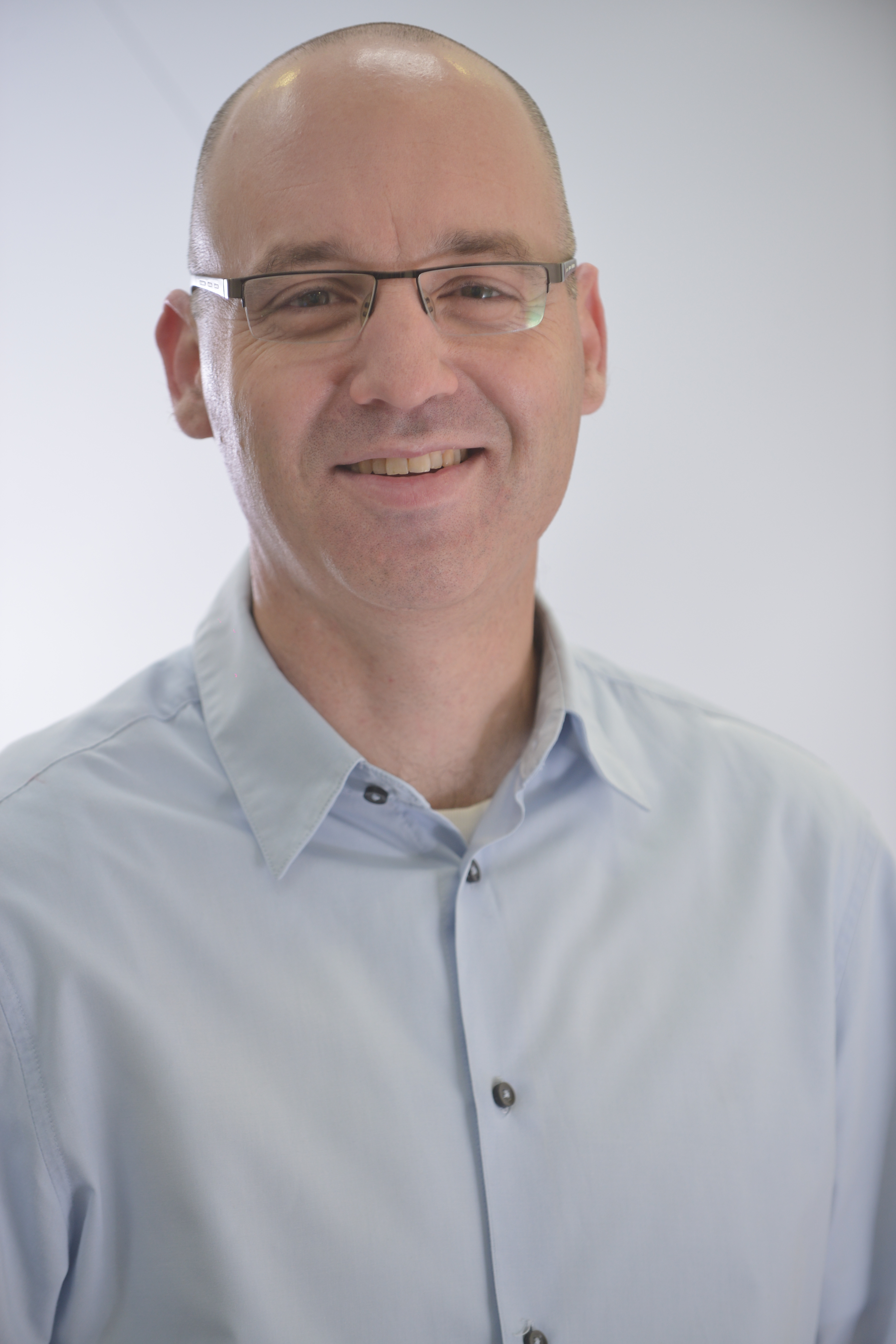
- Born: 14 April 1971 (age 55); Tel Aviv, Israel
- Education: Tel Aviv University
- Employer: College of Management Academic Studies

Yuval Dror (Hebrew: יובל דרור; born April 14, 1971, in Tel Aviv) is an Israeli specialist in sociology of technology. He is the former Dean of School of Media Studies at the College of Management Academic Studies and now serves as the Editor in Chief of the "Making History" podcast network. He is a renowned international speaker and over the years he has given lectures in a large number of international conferences on subjects such as innovation, digital transformation, the fourth industrial revolution, artificial intelligence, social media, trust and big tech. He is regarded as a prominent critic of the power of large technology companies.

== Life ==
Dror grew up in Givataiim that borders Tel Aviv. He served four years in the Israeli Defenses Forces, and then from 1994 to 2001 completed his bachelor's and master's degree in Political science and sociology at Tel Aviv University. His thesis about "virtual communities" was, at that time, first of its kind. In the meantime he worked as an editor of computers books publication, wrote his first book, Who's afraid of Computers?, and later on worked at a trade magazine publication and edited the first Israeli computer newsletter.

From 2000 to 2008 Dror worked as a tech journalist at Haaretz and then promoted to edit the high-tech section. He then worked at the Israeli Channel 2 TV as a technology reporter and as a columnist and commentator at Yedioth Aharonot newspaper . From 2004 to 2008 he studied at Bar-Ilan University, where he received his Ph.D. in Science, Technology and Society (STS) for his thesis about technological constrictions as a political struggle (using SCOT as a theoretical framework). He published his second book, The Politics of Technology and served as an adjunct professor at Tel Aviv University, Ben-Gurion University and Bar-Ilan University.

From 2008 Dror started his role as a media critic as a writer for HaAyin HaShevi'it. He become a staff member at the London et Kirschenbaum TV show, talking about Internet and Technology issues.

After completing his Ph.D. he started teaching at Netanya Academic College and then at the College of Management Academic Studies in Rishon LeZion. He published his third book, Online Journalist at 2011. He served as the school's Dean from 2014 to 2018. In 2019 he published his forth book Hidden Code which became a best-seller. The book analyzes the hidden social and psychological effects of social media platforms on business and politics as well as on our day to day perceptions, worldviews and actions. Later that year Dror started to host "Making Technology", which won the audience award for best tech podcast of 2019 and then again in 2020.

Dror was the MC and keynote speaker at QODE 2019, the biggest technology conference in Queensland, Australia.

Dror is married and have three daughters.

== Published works ==
=== Books ===
- Who's afraid of Computers? (1998, Hebrew)
- The Politics of Technology (2005, Hebrew)
- Online Journalism (2011, Hebrew)
- Hidden Code (2019, Hebrew)

=== Major publications ===
- "Israelis in the Digital age 2012", Joint Research Survey of The College of Management Academic Studies and Google Israel (2012)
- "Learning with Technology: A Survey of Israeli Youth on the Role of Technology in Learning and Teaching", Joint Research Survey of The College of Management Academic Studies and Google Israel (2012)
- "Online Privacy in Israel", Joint Research Survey of The College of Management Academic Studies and Microsoft Israel (2014)
- "‘We are not here for the money’: Founders’ manifestos", New Media & Society, Vol 17, No.4 (2015)
- "Privacy and the Digital Generation Gap: Myth and Reality", MCIS 2015 Proceedings
- "Information privacy and the digital generation gap: An exploratory study", Journal of Information Privacy and Security, Vol 12, No. 4 (2016)
- "AI: Positive Development or Existential Threat", Israel Innovation Report, Israel Innovation Authority (2017)
