= Ruth HaCohen =

Israeli Musicologist (born 1956)

Ruth HaCohen (Pinczower)
- רות הכהן (פינצ'ובר)
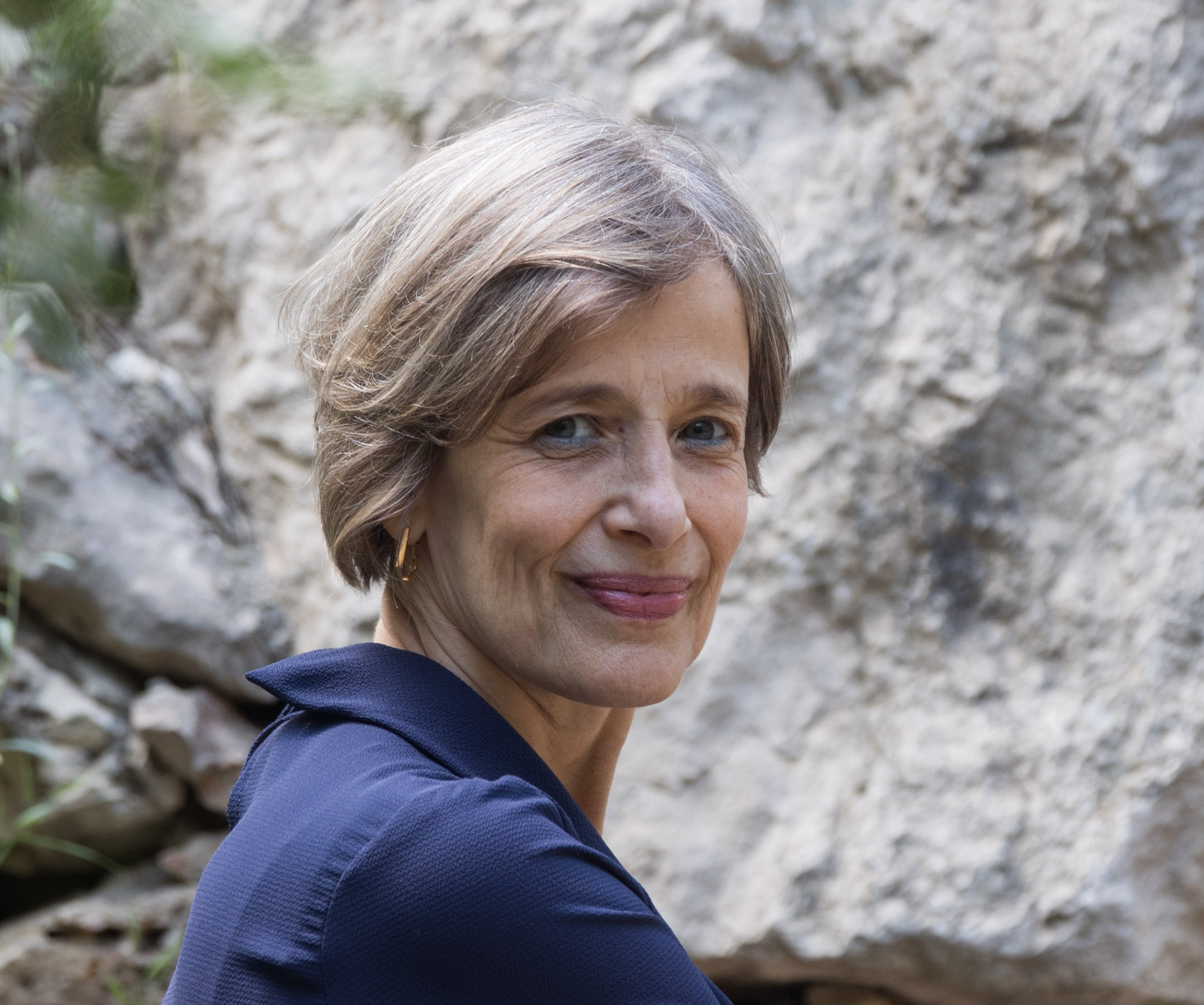
- Born: December 7, 1956 (age 69); Jerusalem
- Occupation: Musicologist
- Title: Professor
- Awards: The Otto Kinkeldey Award (2012), Rothschild Award (2022)

Academic background
- Education: The Hebrew University
- Doctoral advisor: Ruth Katz

Academic work
- Institutions: The Hebrew University
- Notable works: The Music Libel Against the Jews

Professor Ruth HaCohen (Pinczower; Hebrew: רות הכהן פינצ'ובר; born 1956) is an Israeli musicologist and a cultural historian. She holds the Artur Rubinstein Chair of Musicology at the Hebrew University of Jerusalem. Ruth HaCohen is the recipient of the 2022 Rothschild Prize in the Humanities. In 2017, she was elected as Corresponding member by the American Musicological Society (AMS) "for outstanding contributions to the advancement of scholarship in music." In 2026 she was elected a member of the Israel Academy of Sciences and Humanities.

== Life ==
Ruth HaCohen grew up and was educated in Jerusalem. Her parents emigrated from Germany to Palestine (later Israel) in the 1930s. She did her army service in the Nahal (a paramilitary IDF program) mainly as a leader in informal education. She graduated in Musicology and Jewish Thought at the Hebrew University of Jerusalem in 1980 and received her PhD in Musicology (summa cum laude) under the supervision of Prof. Ruth Katz at the Hebrew University (1992).

Ruth HaCohen was married to Yaron Ezrahi, until his death in 2019. She has a son and four grandchildren from her previous marriage.

== Academic career ==
Ruth HaCohen pursued her entire academic career at the Hebrew University of Jerusalem, climbing the ladder of academic promotions. In 2013 she was appointed as the Artur Rubinstein Professor of Musicology. During the 1980s, she was the main Academic Assistant to Ruth Katz and Carl Dahlhaus for the composition of their monumental Contemplating Music: Source Readings in the Aesthetics of Music series. HaCohen founded, in collaboration with other colleagues, the PhD Honors Program in the Humanities at the Hebrew University (2008) and eventually chaired the program. She was Head of the School for the Arts (2013-2015) and the Director of The Martin Buber Society of Fellows (2014-2017). In 2014, she received the Rector Prize for outstanding research, teaching and active participation in university life.

Prof. HaCohen has been a resident in many academic institutions, as a visiting scholar in Oxford in 1996–7; as a research fellow/visiting professor at the Wissenschaftskolleg in Berlin (2004-5), the Cogut Institute for the Humanities at Brown University (2008), the Institute for Advanced Study in Princeton, N. J. (2011), and the Rockefeller Foundation at the Bellagio Center (2012). She has lectured in Oxford, Cambridge and Vienna Universities, UNAM (Mexico), Johns Hopkins, North Carolina, NYU, Duke, Princeton, Central European University, the George Washington University, the Free University of Berlin and the University of Konstanz, among others.

In May 2026 she was elected a member of the Israel Academy of Sciences and Humanities.

== Public activity ==
Ruth HaCohen is a member of the board of directors at the Israel National Library since 2018 and a member of the Van Leer Jerusalem Institute Board of Trustees since 2016. She was a member of the Polyphony Foundation (an organization aiming to bridge the divide between Arab and Jewish communities in Israel through music and to serve as a worldwide model for cooperation) and the Reinhard Strohm Balzan Prize Project “Towards a Global History of Music.” She has also been a member of the Jerusalem Symphony Orchestra board.

== Academic research ==
Ruth HaCohen is the author of books and articles which elucidate the role played by music in the West in shaping and reflecting wide cultural and political contexts and processes from early modernity to the present times. Her point of departure inheres in the nature and limits of music's expressive powers. She explores the ways whereby artistic languages at large, and musical ones in particular, shape imaginative worlds which invite us to willingly summon an artistic illusion. She investigates, accordingly, the works that constitute such experiential worlds from the viewpoint of their genres and styles; among them, opera and oratorio, artistic and folk songs, as well as film and animation.

The imagined worlds of the arts are not created ex nihilo, she maintains, but rather draw on collective social and psychological tenets, which they eventually refashion. In the religious sphere, she demonstrates the modes whereby sounds mold sacred time and space (for instance, in J. S. Bach's oeuvres) and vocal communities (such as the synagogue's congregation). She interprets the ways in which they validate or undermine theology.

In the political sphere, in her work with Yaron Ezrahi and elsewhere, Ruth HaCohen points to the ways whereby works and sonic events uphold regimes (such as monarchies) or forge alternative ways for organizing human coexistence (in national or democratic states).

=== The Music Libel Against the Jews ===
Her major work, The Music Libel Against the Jews (2011), is a wide-ranging study of the historical Christian exclusion of the Jews, accused of producing noise in a musical universe dominated by harmonious sounds. Associating harmonies with divine grace, Christians interpreted the "Jewish noise" issuing from medieval synagogues as a sign of divine forsakenness. HaCohen tracks down the manifestations and roots of the noise accusation to a variation on the famous blood libel that spread throughout Europe during the Crusades, alleging that Jews murdered Christian boys in order to hush their “intolerable” hymns and canticles. Stemming from two diametrically opposed performing practices of handling sound in ritual space, the noise accusation, she argues, records the reciprocal rejection, on the part of the two adversarial communities, of their respective sonic worlds.

The Music Libel Against the Jews examines the dissemination and impact of this music defamation from medieval through modern times in a variety of artistic and political contexts. Transcending the confines of church and synagogue, this study investigates the opening up of the musical sphere towards the Jews' inclusion in the wake of the Enlightenment. Acculturated Jews made considerable endeavors to integrate into that sphere but, as it turned out, they were not actually so welcomed, by the resurgence of the old libels. Pivotal to the Jews' struggle for aural accession are certain art works—musical, literary and pictorial—created by both “invaders” into that common audial space and by those considered its privileged “inhabitants.” From Bach through Lessing, Handel, Mendelssohn, and Heinrich Heine to Richard Wagner, George Eliot, and many others, expressions and rebuttals of the noise accusation are traced and compared. No less crucial to the story of the “noisy Jews” are modern ethnographic records of synagogues’ vocalities, by both Jews and Christians. These records are analyzed vis-à-vis the massive restructuring of synagogal practices, in both Reform and traditional communities, throughout the nineteenth century, in Germany and beyond. Simultaneously, the often-intuitive Jewish project to emancipate noise and dissonance in the sphere of art is assessed in this study as an integral part of European literature and music, consummated by Arnold Schoenberg, Franz Kafka and other creators of Jewish origin. The noise accusation reached a peak in Nazi propaganda films, which also mark its final historical stage. As a whole, the book exposes the often neglected, if crucial role of the sonic worlds we live by in shaping modes of religious, communal and ethnic experience, self-perception and perception of the other, which reinforce, in turn— if not determine—major political trends in human culture.

The Music Libel Against the Jews was winner of the Otto Kinkeldey Award, bestowed by the American Musicological Society, for the most distinguished book in musicology published in 2011. It was also the winner of the 2012 Polonsky First Prize in the research category for creativity and originality in the humanistic disciplines.

=== Tuning the Mind – The Arts in Mind ===
Her early work, in collaboration with Ruth Katz, includes the volumes Tuning the Mind: Connecting Aesthetics to Cognitive Science (2003) and The Arts in Mind: Pioneering Texts of a Coterie of British Men of Letters (2003). These works discuss the paradigm shift in the traditional notion of art as mimetic toward a view of art as worldmaking, a turn beaconed by musical thinking. Engaging the perspectives of both the thinking of late-eighteenth-century English men of letters and the tenets of modern cognitive science, these volumes analyze music as "sense formations without predication," by way of intrinsically analyzing musical contemporary styles and genres, and extrinsically examining the relation of music to its "sister arts." Concomitantly, the books underscore the debt of present-day cognitive theories to historical aesthetic ideas and artistic practices.

== Other studies ==
HaCohen has also probed into the emergence of sympathy and compassion as an ethico-aesthetic framework in seventeenth- and eighteenth-century music, as well as its later repercussions. She investigates modes of signification in eighteenth-century music and in Wagner's opus. She has also written on psycho-sensual and theological matters in Arnold Schoenberg's work and thinking.

HaCohen is about to complete her study Sounds of Suffering: Jews and Christians Listening to Job (temporary title) which explores the theology of sound as reflected in the reception of the book of Job throughout the ages.

HaCohen is a bilingual author. Her writings in Hebrew aim to reach out to both students and the general public. Many of them are still awaiting adaptation to English.
