= Georg Frederik Ferdinand Allen =

Danish singing teacher, conductor and composer

Georg Frederik Ferdinand Allen (1856–1925) was a Danish singing teacher, conductor and composer. He was the brother of musician Robert William Otto Allen.

A pupil of Gustav Helsted, he later studied in Paris and London. He was then a singing teacher in Copenhagen and during 1888 to 1892 a teacher at a conservatory in New York City and the singer at Trinity Church. He conducted for various singing organizations in Copenhagen: including the Artisans' Association choir and the Forsvarsbrøcrenes Mason choir.
