= 1888 in Norwegian music =

The following is a list of notable events and releases of the year 1888 in Norwegian music.

== Deaths ==
June

- 22 – Edmund Neupert, pianist and composer (born 1842).

== Births ==
November

- 8 – David Monrad Johansen, composer (died 1974).

== See also ==
- 1888 in Norway
- Music of Norway
