= Melograph =

Mechanical apparatus for transcribing music

The Melograph, similar to the Melodiograph, is a mechanical apparatus for ethnomusicological transcription usually producing some sort of graph that can be preserved and filed, similar to a recording of music. Beginning with attempts by Milton Metfessel in 1928, assorted devices such as this have been developed or manufactured, the most notable dating back to the 1950s and situated at the University of California in Los Angeles (Charles Seeger), the University of Oslo (Olav Gurvin and Karl Dahlback), and the Hebrew University in Jerusalem (Dalia Cohen and Ruth Katz).
