= Yaron Ezrahi =

Israeli political theorist and philosopher (1940-2019)

- ירון אזרחי
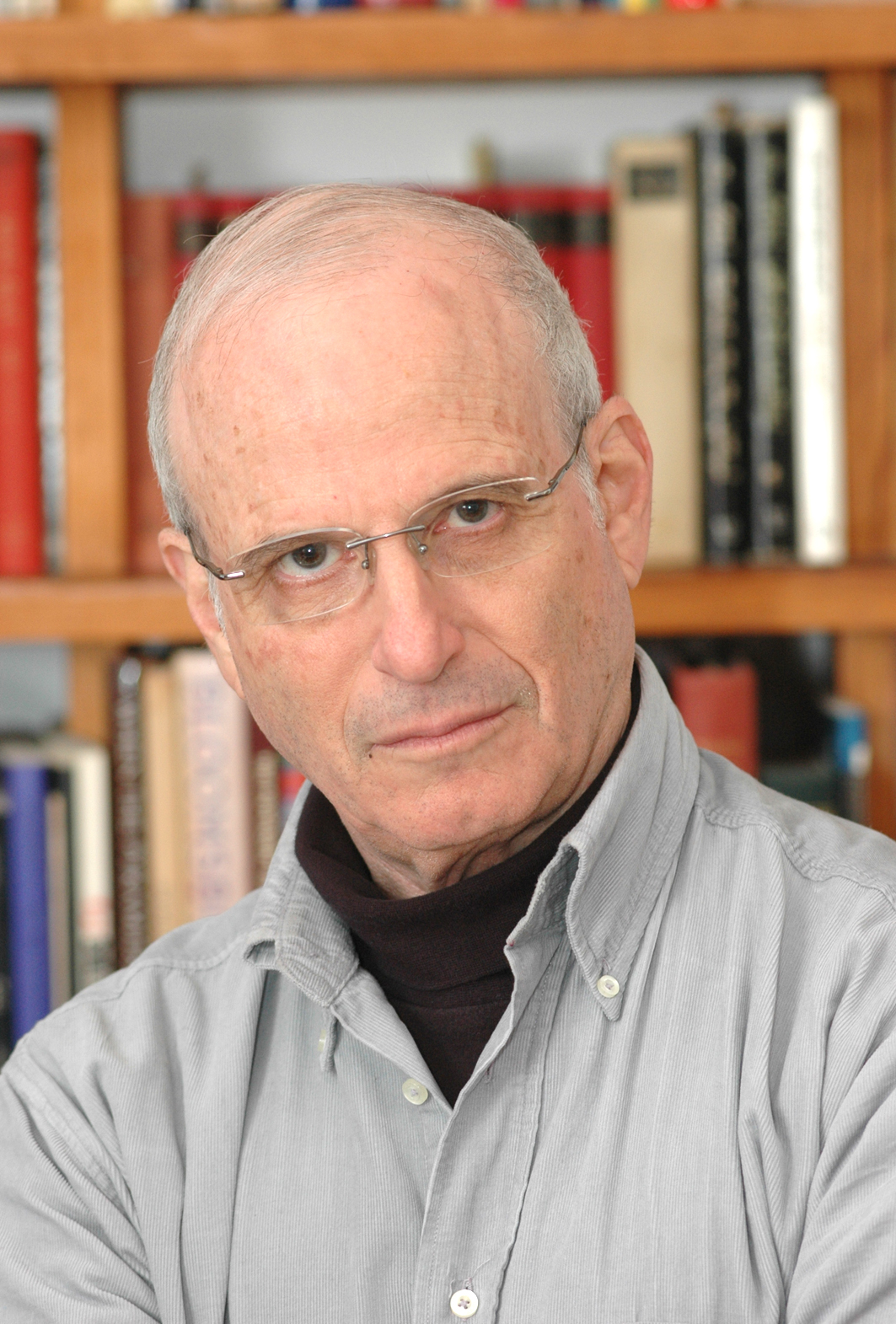
- Yaron Ezrahi
- Born: 19 April 1940; Tel Aviv, Mandatory Palestine
- Died: 29 January 2019 (aged 78)
- Education: Hebrew University of Jerusalem (BA, MA); Harvard University (PhD)
- Occupations: Political theorist, Philosopher, Professor
- Employer(s): The Hebrew University of Jerusalem, Israel Democracy Institute
- Known for: Work on the relationship between science, technology, and democracy
- Notable work: Imagined Democracies: Necessary Political Fictions (2012); Rubber Bullets: Power and Conscience in Modern Israel; Can Democracy Recover? The Roots of the Crisis in Democratic Faith
- Awards: National Jewish Book Award (1997); Prize honoring lifetime work (2010)

Yaron Ezrahi (Hebrew: ירון אזרחי; 19 April 1940 – 29 January 2019) was an Israeli political theorist and philosopher, professor at the Hebrew University of Jerusalem, a senior Fellow at the Israel Democracy Institute in Jerusalem, and a public intellectual. Ezrahi was known for his work on the relations between modern science and the rise of the modern liberal democratic state and the political uses of scientific knowledge and authority. His late work focuses on the deterioration of the Enlightenment version of the partnership between science, technology and democracy, the changing parameters of postmodern imaginaries, and performances of the democratic order. His books, written in English and Hebrew, were translated into German and Chinese.

== Personal life and education ==
Ezrahi was born in 1940 in Tel Aviv, Mandatory Palestine. He is the son of the music educator, composer and violinist Yariv Ezrahi (cousin of President Ezer Weizman; counts amongst his pupils Daniel Barenboim), and Hannah Ezrahi (née Diesenhaus) who was a curator and librarian in the early years of the Tel Aviv Museum of Art. His grandfather, Mordechai Krichevsky-Ezrahi, came to Palestine in the 19th-century from what is now Ukraine in Zionist first Aliyah, taking a part in the revival of the Hebrew language. He graduated from Tichon Hadash high school in Tel-Aviv in 1958, completed army service in 1960, graduated in political science and philosophy at the Hebrew University in 1964, received his master's degree in political science at the Hebrew University in 1966 and PhD in political science at Harvard University in 1972. Yaron Ezrahi was married to Sidra DeKoven Ezrahi and they have three children: Talya, Ariel, and Tehila. From 2001 he was married to Ruth HaCohen (Pinczower), a professor of Musicology at the Hebrew University of Jerusalem.

== Career ==
As a doctoral student, Ezrahi served as an adviser on science policy at the White House in 1970, and the OECD (1969-1970). Later he served as an adviser to the Israel Academy of Sciences and Humanities in Israel (1973-1983). Ezrahi was one of the founders of the Israel Democracy Institute where he served between the 1993–2003. In this capacity he co-founded The Seventh Eye, Israel's magazine for press criticism charged with guarding professional journalistic standards. As a Senior Fellow at the IDI, Ezrahi joined a small committee of scholars headed by the former chief justice Meir Shamgar which wrote the most recent draft of a constitution for Israel.

In Ezrahi's publications between 1971 and 1990, he established the impact of the scientific revolution on the rise of the instrumental concept of politics in the modern democratic state and on its commitments to the transparency and accountability of power, the ideological neutrality of the state, deliberative public discourse and the rationality of public policy. Ezrahi has shown that despite such commitments, the political uses of scientific authorities and experts as political resources have often eclipsed the application of relevant bodies of knowledge in public policy. Ezrahi has backed up his claims by the analysis of the controversy over the relations between IQ group scores and genetics, the political uses of science indicators, the analysis of the latent selective process induced by civil epistemology, and the political contexts of scientific advice.

Ezrahi's works since the early 1990s concentrated on the changing interaction between science and politics in post-Enlightenment or postmodern democracies. They include two articles on the impact of Einstein's physics on democratic culture and the ironic implications of his esoteric theories on his commitment to participatory democracy; Ezrahi's entry in the International Encyclopedia of the Social & Behavioral Sciences; and his work on the relations between modes of reasoning and the politics of authority in the modern state. Ezrahi contributed articles on liberty and republicanism to the Harvard volume on the classical tradition. Ezrahi investigated the impact of the shifting political imagination of the political order on the rise, decline and transformation of democracy. This research evolved into a revisionist theory of democracy which combines the institutionalization of hegemonic imaginaries of order with their enactment or performance by political actors and the latent processes of naturalizing fictions into realities. This work has been consolidated in Ezrahi's 2012 book Imagined Democracies: Necessary Political Fictions.

Ezrahi collaborated with his wife, Professor Ruth HaCohen, in writing Composing Power, Singing Freedom, a book which probes the ways whereby diverse musical forms were deployed for the sake of legitimation or delegitimation of early and late modern regimes, including monarchies, republics, liberal and social democracies, as well as totalitarian regimes.

His last book Can Democracy Recover? The Roots of the Crisis in Democratic Faith, which he completed shortly before he died, analyzes the current crisis of democratic institutions and of faith in democracy that reflects the increasing inability of contemporary lay publics to make sense of the political universe in which they live. It explores the current breakdown of common-sense conception of political reality and the erosion of democratic political epistemology that trigger the disruptive proliferation of popular political conspiracy theories. The book further attempts to propose the conditions for the refashioning of democracy on a new post-Enlightenment basis.

=== Works on Israeli politics and public policy ===
Ezrahi has been one of the leading academic interpreters of Israel's politics and civic culture in the Israeli and international media. His book Rubber Bullets, Power and Conscience in Modern Israel examines the ways Zionism by increasingly promoting tribal values has come to devalue liberal democratic ideals of individual happiness and self–realization. The book provides a candid critical examination of the implications of the mounting tensions between nationalism and liberalism for Israeli attitudes towards military violence, political rhetoric, education and culture.

Ezrahi published with his assistants at the Israeli Democracy Institute also policy oriented works in Hebrew on the need to reform the Israeli television, a book on the problem of cross ownership in the Israeli media and with Professor Kremnitzer a book on Israel's Path towards a Constitutional Democracy.

As one of the leading authorities on Israeli politics and democracy, Yaron Ezrahi has appeared as an analyst on the Israeli and the international media. He has written columns for the Israeli daily Haaretz, the New York Times, and has been interview by Foreign Affairs, CNN, the BBC, 60 Minutes, and Al Hayat.

== Awards and honours ==
- Graduate Prize Fellowship, Harvard 1966-1970
- National Science Foundation grant 1977
- Russell Sage Foundation grant 1984
- National Jewish Book Award for Rubber Bullets: Power and Conscience in Modern Israel (1997)
- A prize honoring Professor Ezrahi Life work 2010

== Selected publications ==
=== Books ===
- The Descent of Icarus: Science and the Transformation of Contemporary Democracy, Harvard University Press, 1990. Shortly forthcoming also in Chinese at Shanghai by Jiao Yong University Press.
- Technology, Pessimism and Postmodernism: Yaron Ezrahi, Everett Mendelsohn and Howard Segal (eds.), Sociology of Science Yearbook 1993, Dordrecht, Kluwer Academic Press, 1993.
- Rubber Bullets, Power and Conscience in Modern Israel, New York: Farrar, Straus and Giroux, 1996; Berkeley: University of California Press, 1998. Published also in German by Alexander Fest publishing House as Gewalt und Gewissen. Israels langer Weg in die Moderne (1998). Winner of the American National Jewish Book Award 1997.
- Israel Towards a Constitutional Democracy: (With M. Kremnitzer), Jerusalem: The Israeli Democracy Institute, 2001 (in Hebrew).
- Cross Ownership: Control and Competition in the Israeli Media: Economic and Legal Aspects and their Impact on the Israeli Democracy (With Zohar Goshen and Shmuel Leshem), Jerusalem: The Israel Democracy Institute, 2003 (in Hebrew).
- Imagined Democracies: Necessary Political Fictions, Cambridge and New York: Cambridge University Press, 2012.
- Composing Power, Singing Freedom: The Interplay of Music and Politics in the West, Van Leer Institute Press (With Ruth HaCohen), 2017 (in Hebrew; English Translation in Progress).
- Can Democracy Recover? The Roots of the Crisis in Democratic Faith (forthcoming).

=== Articles (selection) ===
- "The Political Resources of American Science" in Science Studies 1 (1971), pp. 117–133 (Republished in Penguin, Modern Readings in the Sociology of Science 1971).
- "The Jensen Controversy: A Study in the Ethics and Politics of Knowledge in Democracy," in Controversies and Decisions: the Social Sciences and Public Policy Charles Frankel (ed.), New York: Russell Sage Foundation, 1976, pp. 149–170.
- "Political Contexts of Science Indicators" in Towards a Metrics of Science, the Advent of Science Indicators, Yehuda Elkana, Joshua Lederberg, Robert K. Merton, Arnold Thackeray and Harriet Zuckerman (eds.), New York: John Wiley and Sons, 1978, pp. 285–327.
- "Einstein and the Light of Reason," in Albert Einstein: Historical and Cultural Perspectives, Gerald Holton and Yehuda Elkana (eds.), Princeton: Princeton University Press, 1979, pp. 253–278.
- "Science and the Problem of Authority in Democracy," in Science and Social Structure: a Festschrift for Robert K. Merton, New York: Transactions of The New York Academy of Sciences (series II vol. 39), 1980, pp. 43–60.
- "Utopian and Pragmatic Rationalism: The Political Context of Scientific Advice," Minerva 18/1 (Spring 1980), pp. 111–131.
- "Science and the Civic Spirit of Liberal Democracy," in Civil Religion and Political Theology: Leroy S. Rouner (ed.), Notre Dame: University of Notre Dame Press, 1986, pp. 59–75.
- "Technology and the civil Epistemology of Democracy," Inquiry: An Interdisciplinary Journal of Philosophy 135/3-4 (September/December 1992), pp. 363–376.
- "Science and the Political Imagination in Contemporary Democracies" in States of Knowledge, The Co-Production of Science and Social Order, Sheila Jasanoff ed. Routledge 1994 pp. 254–273
- "The Theatrics and Mechanics of Action: The Theater and the Machine as Political Metaphors," Social Research 62/2 (1995), pp. 299–322.
- "Modes of Reasoning and the Politics of Authority in the Modern State," in Modes of Thought: Explorations in Culture and Cognition, David R. Olson and Nancy Torrance (eds.), Cambridge: Cambridge University Press, 1996, pp. 72–89.
- "Dewey’s Critic of Democratic Visual Culture and its Political Implications," in States of Vision; The Discursive Construction of Sight in the History of Philosophy, David Michael Levin (ed.), Cambridge: MIT Press, 1997, pp. 315–336.
- "New History for a New Israel: Two Landmark Looks at a Sentimentalized Past," Foreign Affairs 79/1 (2000), pp. 158–162.
- "Liberty" and "Republicanism", essays in The Classical Tradition: Anthony Grafton, Glenn W. Most and Salvatore Settis (eds.), Cambridge Mass.: The Belknap Press of Harvard University Press, 2010, pp. 529–539; 819–822.
- "Einstein's Unintended Legacy: The Critique of Common-Sense Realism and Post-Modern Politics", in: Einstein for the 21st Century: His Legacy in Science, Art, and Modern Culture, Peter Galison, Gerald Holton and Silvan S. Schweber (eds.), Princeton: Princeton University Press, 2008, pp. 48–58.
- "The Occupation and Israeli Democracy," in The impact of a Lasting Occupation, Lessons From Israeli Society, Daniel Bar-Tal and Izhak Schnell (eds.), Oxford: Oxford University Press, 2013, pp. 189–207.
- "The Cultural Dimension of the Concept of Power in Modern Democracy" Zmanim Historical Quarterly 50-51 winter 1994 pp. 4–15 (in Hebrew)
- "How the Individual creates Himself" Zmanim Historical Quarterly 104 Autumn 2008 pp7–10 (in Hebrew)
