= 1884 in Nordic music =

The following is a list of notable events that occurred in the year 1884 in Nordic music.

== Events ==
- unknown date – Otto Malling gives up his role as conductor of the Copenhagen Students' Choral Society after 12 years in the position.

== New works ==
- Edvard Grieg – Holberg Suite (for piano)
- Otto Malling
  - Concert Fantasia
  - Symphony in D minor, Op. 17
- Christian Sinding – Til Molde

== Births ==
- 22 April – Armas Launis, Finnish composer and musicologist (died 1959)
- 26 April – Eidé Norena, Norwegian operatic soprano (died 1968)
- 2 June – Hanna Granfelt, Finnish operatic soprano (died 1952)
- 30 November – Ture Rangström, Danish composer (died 1947)
- 11 December – Arne Svendsen, Norwegian songwriter (died 1958)

== Deaths ==
- 24 January – Johann Christian Gebauer, Danish composer, organist and music theorist (born 1808)
- 19 March – Elias Lönnrot, Finnish polymath, collector of folk melodies and lyrics (born 1802)

== See also ==
- 1880s in Danish music
- 1884 in Norwegian music
- 1884 in Sweden
