= Alley Cat (song) =

Single by Bent Fabric

from the album Alley Cat
- B-side: "Markin' Time"
- Released: 1962
- Genre: Pop
- Length: 2:24
- Label: Metronome (Denmark); Atco (US/Canada); Columbia (other countries)
- Songwriter(s): Bent Fabric

Bent Fabric singles chronology
"Alley Cat" (1962)	"Chicken Feed" (1963)

"Alley Cat", also known as "Alleycat" and "The Alley Cat," is a popular instrumental song made most famous by the Danish pianist and composer Bent Fabric, released in 1962. Fabric (born Bent Fabricius-Bjerre) wrote the tune under the pseudonym Frank Björn.

== History ==
The song was originally released in November, 1961, under the Danish title "Omkring et flygel," which means "Around a Piano." In 1962, the Bent Fabric composition reached number 7 on the Billboard Hot 100 chart and number 2 on the Billboard Adult Contemporary chart. In Australia, it went to number 2 and in Germany it went to number 49. It also won a Grammy Award for Best Rock & Roll Recording during the 5th Grammy Awards. It sold over one million copies and was awarded a gold disc. Siw Malmkvist recorded the song in Swedish, "Våran katt", in Danish, "Vores kat" and in German, "Schwarzer Kater Stanislaus" (1962).

== Critical reception ==
The song received generally positive reviews. Matt Dennis of the Windsor Star said it had an "infectious, toe-tapping tempo."

== Chart history ==
=== Weekly charts ===
Chart (1962)	Peak position
Australia	2
Canada (CHUM Hit Parade)	4
Germany	49
New Zealand (Lever Hit Parade)	7
U.S. Billboard Hot 100	7
U.S. Billboard Easy Listening	2
U.S. Cash Box Top 100	6

=== Year-end charts ===
Chart (1962)	Rank
US Billboard Hot 100	37
US Cash Box	40

== Notable recordings ==
- Ray Conniff
- Bent Fabric
- Chet Atkins
- Al Hirt
- Peggy Lee
- Siw Malmkvist (in German)
- Berl Olswanger and the Berl Olswanger Orchestra (1964)
- Bobby Rydell
- David Thorne (reached #76 on the Billboard Hot 100 in November 1962)
- Kidsongs

== In popular culture ==
The song has appeared in numerous films, including:

- The 1989 film Shag, starring Phoebe Cates and Bridget Fonda
- The 1994 film Cabin Boy, starring Chris Elliott and Andy Richter
- The 1999 film Just Looking, starring Ryan Merriman
- The 2000 film Duets, starring Gwyneth Paltrow and Huey Lewis
- The 2004 film Imaginary Heroes, starring Sigourney Weaver and Emile Hirsch.
- It was also used in multiple episodes of Get a Life, such as "Zoo Animals on Wheels."
- The song appeared in two episodes of Family Guy.
- In "The Wedding Affair," the fifteenth episode of Season 1 of Mad About You, Paul and Jamie Buchman (Paul Reiser and Helen Hunt respectively) make an uninspiring attempt at dancing to the instrumental with forearms and hands somewhat extended forward and fingers pointed downward to mimic a cat's paws and listlessly saying "meow" at the end of the refrains.
- It is also frequently used by ice cream trucks in the US and Mexico.
