= Holger Drachmann =

Danish author and painter (1846–1908)

Holger Drachmann

Holger Henrik Herholdt Drachmann (9 October 1846 – 14 January 1908) was a Danish poet, dramatist and painter. He was a member of the Skagen artistic colony and became a figure of the Scandinavian Modern Breakthrough Movement.

== Early years ==
Drachmann was born in Copenhagen, Denmark. He was the son of Andreas Georg Drachmann (1810–1892) and Wilhelmine Marie Stæhr (1820–1857). His father was a surgeon with the Royal Danish Navy. The family belonged to the German-speaking congregation at St. Peter's Church (Sankt Petri Kirke) in Copenhagen.

Owing to the early death of his mother, he was left much to his own devices and developed a fondness for semi-poetical performances, organising his companions in heroic games, in which he himself took such roles as those of Royal Danish Naval heroes Peder Tordenskjold and Niels Juel.

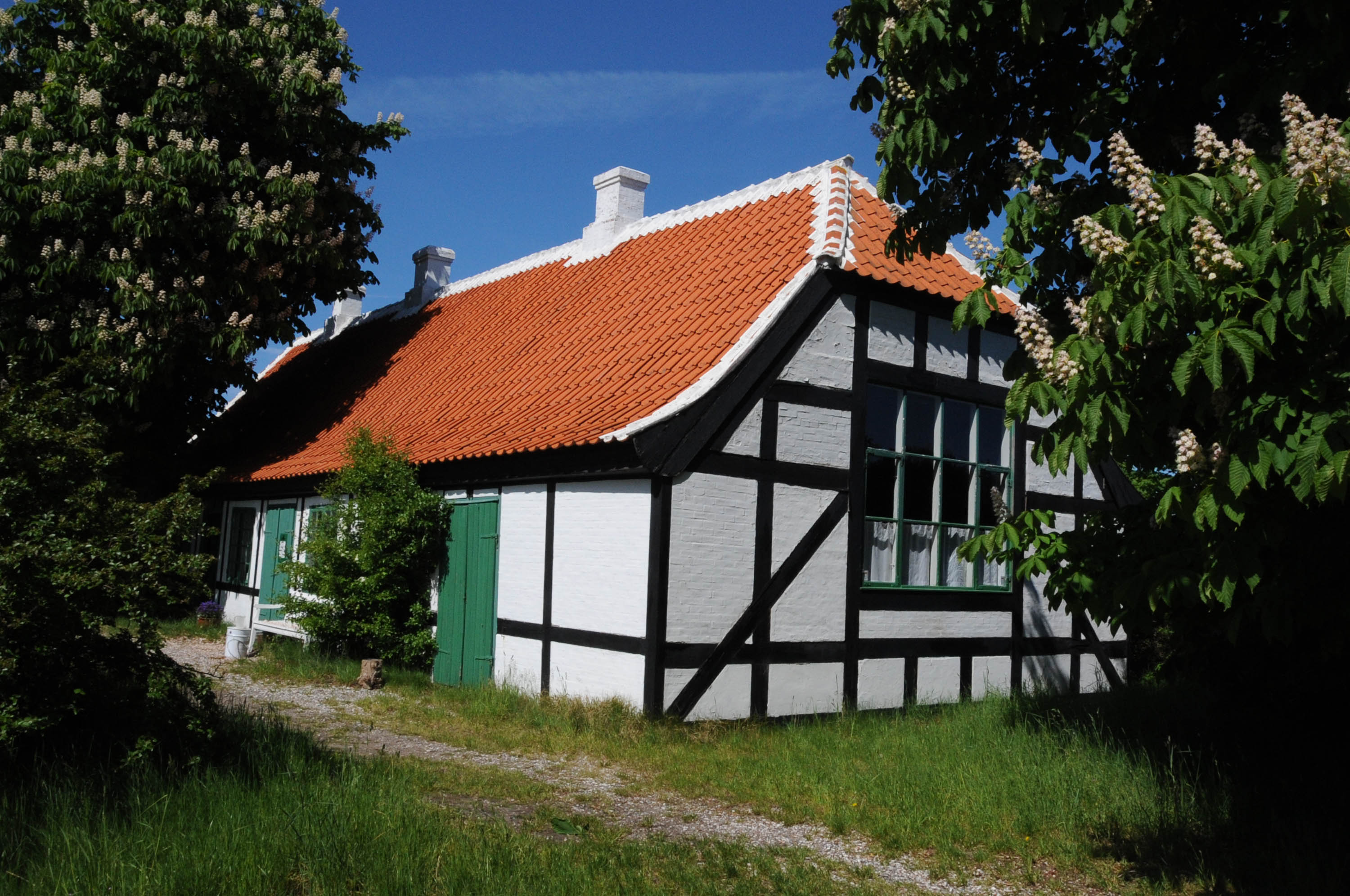
Drachmanns Hus in Skagen

== Skagen ==
Drachmann first visited Skagen in 1872 with the Norwegian painter Frits Thaulow. He frequently returned, associating with the growing colony of artists known as the Skagen Painters (Skagensmalerne) although his painting took second place to his writing. In 1903, he and his third wife Soffi settled in Skagen's Vesterby in their Villa Pax. Later in life, Drachmann returned to art, often painting pictures of ships and the sea.

== Personal life ==
Holger was sent to Bornholm to learn to paint. There he met his first wife Vilhelmine Erichsen (1852–1935), whom he married in 1871 in Gentofte. They had one daughter, Eva. In 1874, his marriage ended. He was then involved with a married woman named Polly for a short while. Shortly after she gave birth to a daughter, she broke contact with him. He then met with a young girl in Hamburg by the name of Emmy. They fell in love and got married. They adopted Polly's daughter and had four more children of their own. In 1887, she became seriously ill, and one of their daughters died the same year. Perhaps suffering from stress, he fled into a relation with cabaret singer Amanda Nielsen (1866–1953), whom he called Edith and who became his biggest muse. He would have many muses in his life, but on his deathbed he said that his two biggest muses were Vilhelmine and Edith. He died in Copenhagen and is buried in the sand dunes at Grenen, near Skagen. After his death his Skagen home, Drachmanns Hus, became a museum.

== Career ==
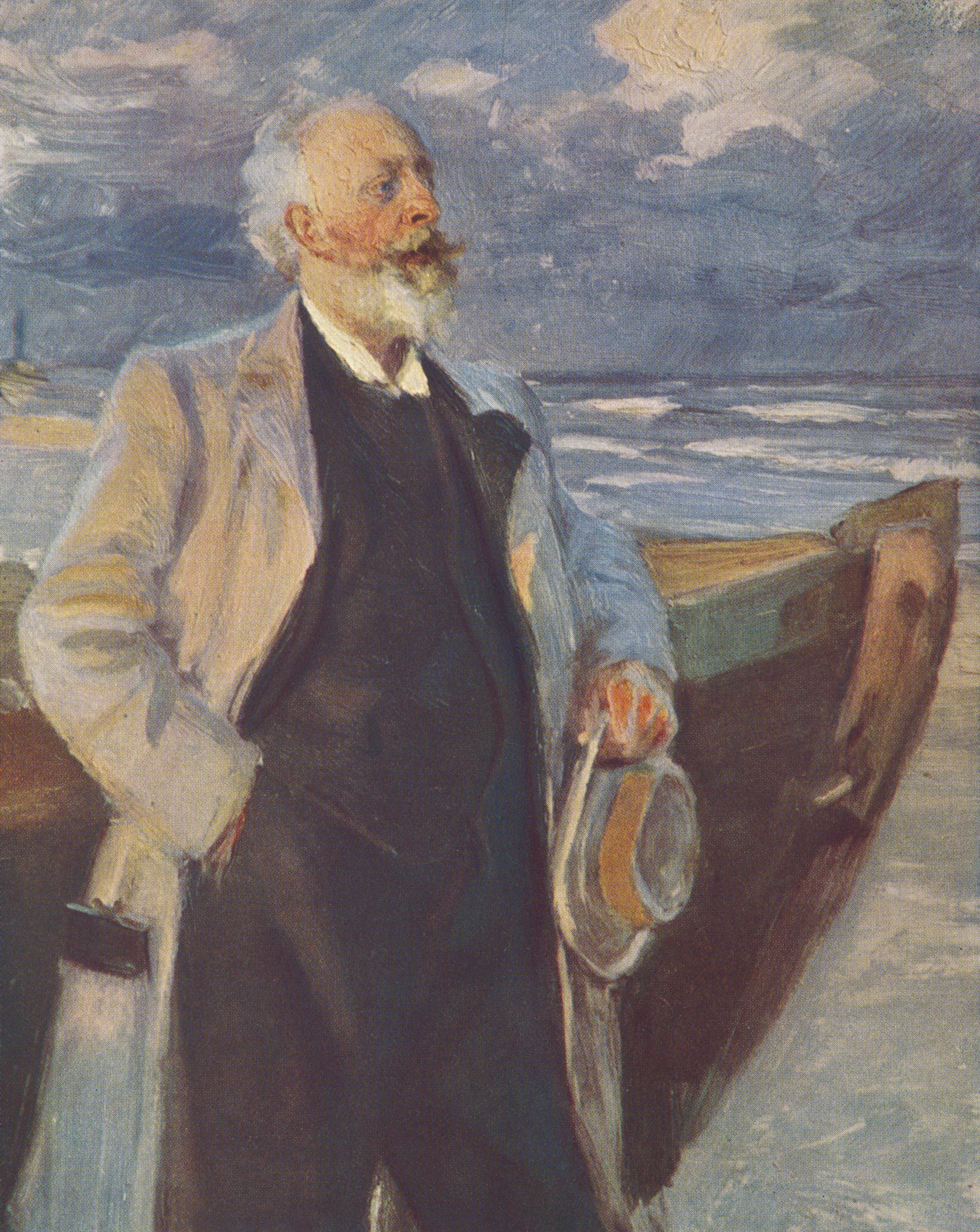
Drachmann painted by Peder Severin Krøyer

Behind in his studies, he did not enter university until 1865, leaving it in 1866 to become a student at the Royal Danish Academy of Fine Arts. From 1866 to 1870, he learned, under Professor C F Sørensen, to become a marine painter, with some success. In about 1870 he came under the influence of Danish critic and scholar Georg Brandes (1842–1927) and without abandoning art, began to devote most of his time more to literature. At various periods he travelled very extensively in England, Scotland, France, Spain and Italy, and his literary career began by his sending letters about his journeys to the Danish newspapers.

After returning home, he settled for some time on the island of Bornholm, achieving fame for his painting of seascapes and ships in storms. He then issued his earliest volume of poems in 1872 with Digte, going on to join the group of young Radical writers who followed Brandes. Drachmann was unsettled, and still doubted whether his real strength lay in the pencil or in the pen. By this time he had enjoyed a surprising experience of life, especially among sailors, fishermen, students and artists, and the issues of the Franco-German War and the Paris Commune had persuaded him that a new and glorious era was at hand.

His volume of lyrics, Dæmpede Melodier (Muffled Melodies, 1875), proved that Drachmann was a poet with a real vocation, and he began to produce books in prose and verse with great rapidity. Ungt Blod (Young Blood, 1876) contained three realistic stories of contemporary life. But he returned to his true field in his most famous work, the collection of poems Sange ved Havet; Venezia (Songs of the Sea; Venice, 1877), and won the passionate admiration of his countrymen by his prose work, with interludes in verse, called Derovre fra grænsen (Over the Frontier there, 1877), a series of impressions made on Drachmann by a visit to the scenes of the war with Germany. Drachman's novel En Overkomplet (1876) was followed by Tannhäuser (1877), which despite reference to the medieval legend and Wagner's opera from 1845, is a contemporary love story set in Fredensborg. The poems from the novel were set by various Danish composers, including Peter Heise's cycle "Farlige Drømme".

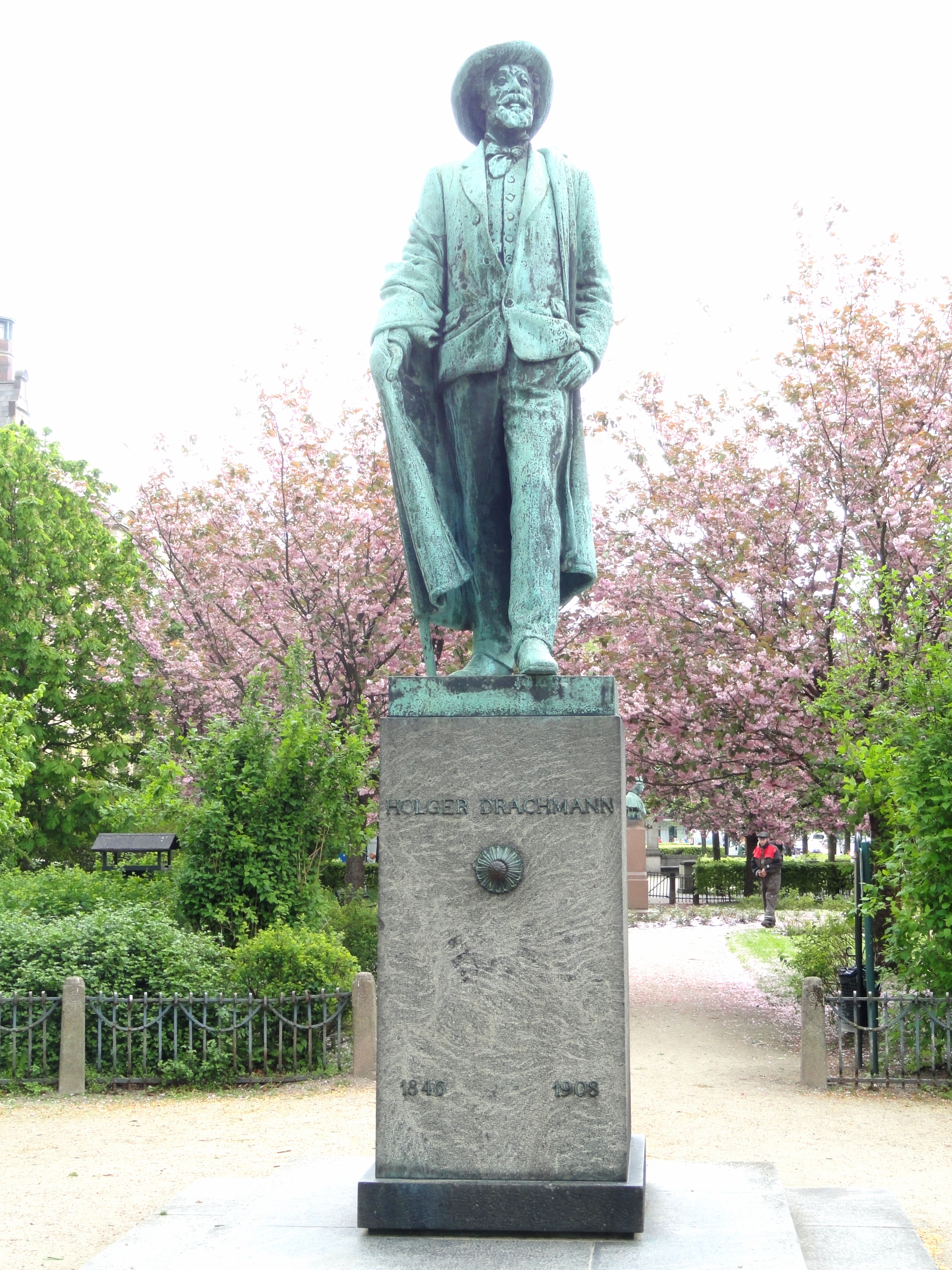
Holger Drachmann statue at Frederiksberg in Copenhagen by Hans Christian Holter

During the succeeding years he visited most of the principal countries of the world, but particularly familiarizing himself, by protracted voyages, with the sea and with the life of man in maritime places. In 1879 he published Ranker og Roser (Tendrils and Roses), amatory lyrics of a very high order of melody, in which he showed a great advance in technical art. To the same period belongs Paa sømands tro og love (On the Faith and Honor of a Sailor, 1878), a volume of short stories in prose.

It was about this time that Drachmann broke with Brandes and the Radicals, and set himself at the head of a sort of nationalist or popular-Conservative movement in Denmark. He continued to celebrate the life of the fishermen and sailors in books, whether in prose or verse, which were the most popular of their day. Paul og Virginie and Lars Kruse (both 1879); Østen for sol og vesten for maane (East of the Sun and West of the Moon, 1880); Puppe og Sommerfugl (Chrysalis and Butterfly, 1882); and Strandby Folk (1883) were among these. At the beginning of the 1890s he again joined the Brandes fraction without giving up his national motives. His many changing sides has often been regarded as opportunism but were probably caused by his eternal enthusiasm and longing for a positive fundament of his art.

In 1882, Drachmann published his fine translation, or paraphrase, of Byron's Don Juan. In 1885, his romantic play Der var engang (Once upon a Time) had a great success on the boards of the Royal Danish Theatre in Copenhagen, and has remained a classic. His tragedies Vølund Smed (Wayland the Smith, 1894) and Brav-karl (1897) established him as the most popular playwright of Denmark. In 1894, he published a volume of fantastic Melodramas in rhymed verse, a collection which contains some of Drachmann's best work.

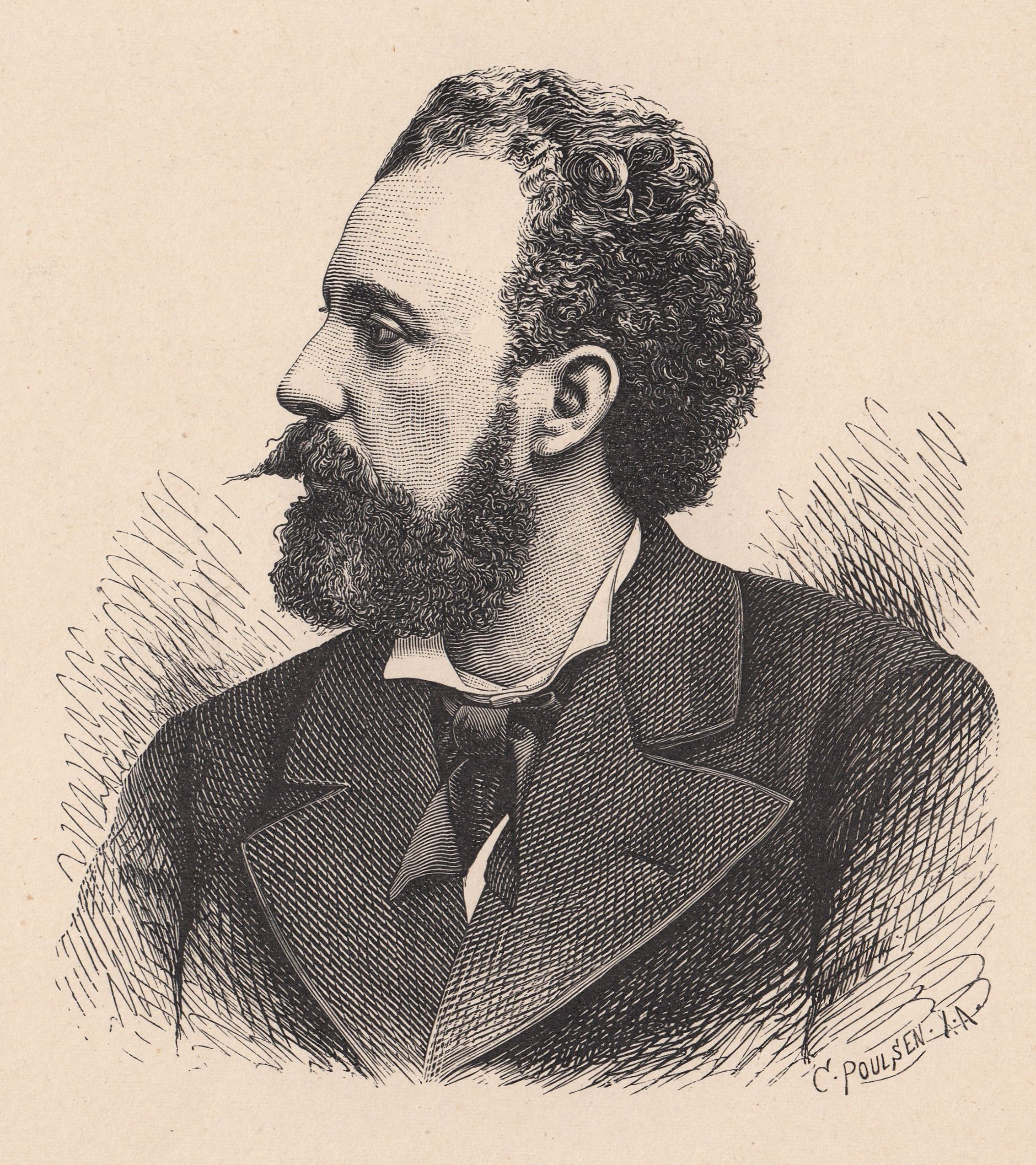
Holger Drachmann, circa 1894

His novel Med den brede Pensel (With a Broad Brush, 1887) was followed in 1890 by Forskrevet, the history of a young painter, Henrik Gerhard, and his revolt against his bourgeois surroundings. Closely connected to this novel is Den hellige Ild (The Sacred Fire, 1899), in which Drachmann speaks in his own person. There is practically no story in this autobiographical volume, which abounds in lyrical passages. In 1899, he produced his romantic play Gurre; in 1900 a brilliant lyrical drama, Hallfred Vandraadeskjald; and in 1903, Det grønne Haab.

== Legacy ==
Drachmann is one of the most popular Danish poets of modern time though much of his work is now forgotten. He unites modern rebellionist attitudes and a really romantic view of women and history. His personal appearance often almost overshadowed his literary merits and in many ways he played the role of the "typical" bohemian poet with a turbulent private life. His relationship with various women (his "muses") often made a great scandal but it was the fuel of his inspiration. Especially "Edith", a cabaret singer who was his mistress during the 1890s and inspired much of his best love poetry. His often rhetorical approach to poetry and occasional "wordiness" has led some critics to compare him with English poet, playwright and novelist Algernon Charles Swinburne (1837–1909).

== Other sources ==
- See an article by Karl Gjellerup in Dansk Biografisk Lexikon vol. iv (Copenhagen, 1890).
