= Amanda Nielsen =

Danish cabaret singer

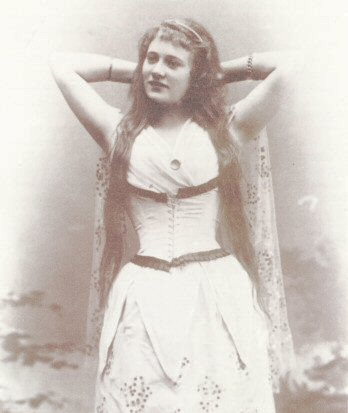
Amanda Nielsen

Amanda Jensine Nielsen (16 February 1866 – 2 December 1953) was a Danish cabaret singer who became famous as Holger Drachmann's muse Edith, inspiring some of his most romantic works.

== Biography ==
Born on 16 February 1866 in Copenhagen's Vesterbro, Nielsen was brought up by her working-class parents Jöns Nilsson (1824–1909) and Jensine Jensdatter (1822–96). After her father was injured in an accident, she worked as a seamstress but, when 18, doubled her earnings by singing in Frederiksberg's Alleenberg Theatre, where she quickly gained popularity.

After a tour in Finland, Nielsen returned to Copenhagen where she became a star attraction at the Café Chantant. It was here that she met the poet Holger Drachmann in 1887. Despite the fact that he was married and twice her age, he adopted her as his muse, referring to her as Edith and paying tribute to her in his novel Forskrevet (1890). Shortly afterwards she began to sing at the Kisten in Tivoli but as rumours grew about her relationship, she left the country with Drachmann, settling in Hamburg, Germany, where she had her own apartment and sang in St. Pauli. She spent a number of happy years with Drachmann until 1897 when he had an affair with another young woman.

In 1898, she married the businessman Bernhard Gerlach, raising their children in Hamburg after he died. In 1947, she sent the love letters she had received from Drachmann to the Royal Danish Library. She died in Hamburg on 2 December 1953.
