= Christian Henrik Glass =

Danish composer, organist, and pianist

Christian Henrik Glass (18 May 1821 - 12 August 1893) was a Danish composer, organist and pianist.

Glass was born in Kjøbenhvn on 18 May 1821. He received his education at the Siboni Conservatory, where he was a student of Johann Peter Emilius Hartmann. Glass was a member of the Royal Danish Theatre choir, as a boy soprano, and in 1842 established himself as a piano teacher. In 1846-1849 he moved to Aarhus, where he taught singing at the Cathedral School. In 1849 he returned to Copenhagen, where he resumed his work as a piano teacher, while writing and publishing piano music. short period as assistant organist at Christiansborg Palace chapel, before being appointed in 1859, the organist at the Reformed Church, a position he remained in until his death in 1893.

In 1877, Glass established a conservatory for piano, which was continued by his son, composer and pianist Louis Glass, which lasted until 1932. Almost all of Glass' music is written for piano, and piano teaching, however he did write a few orchestral pieces, including a mourning march for the King of Denmark, Frederik VII's funeral.
