= Alley Cat (album) =

Studio album by Bent Fabric
- Released: 1962
- Genre: Swing
- Label: ATCO Records

Bent Fabric chronology
Alley Cat (1962)	The Happy Puppy (1962)

Singles from Alley Cat
- 1. "Alley Cat" Released: May 1962

Alley Cat is the debut album by Danish pianist Bent Fabric. The album features the Grammy Award-winning single "Alley Cat", and was a charting album in 1962-63.

The title song is used as a recurring gag on the short-lived 1990 TV show Get a Life.

The cover was designed by Haig Adishian, and was a Billboard Album Cover of the Week in October 1962.

== Track listing ==
1. "Alley Cat" (2:24)
2. "Across the Alley from the Alamo" (2:11)
3. "You Made Me Love You" (3:03)
4. "Trudie" (1:56)
5. "Markin' Time" (1:38)
6. "In the Arms of My Love" (2:28)
7. "Delilah" (2:15)
8. "Catsanova Walk" (1:58)
9. "Symphony" (2:19)
10. "Early Morning In Copenhagen" (2:22)
11. "Comme Ci, Comme Ca" (2:06)
12. "Baby Won't You Please Come Home" (2:50)
