= Bent Fabric =

Danish pianist and composer (1924–2020)

- Born: 7 December 1924; Frederiksberg, Denmark
- Died: 28 July 2020 (aged 95)
- Genres: Classical, pop, jazz
- Occupations: Pianist, composer
- Labels: Atco, Universal
- Website: www.fabricius-bjerre.dk

Bent Fabricius-Bjerre (7 December 1924 – 28 July 2020), better known internationally as Bent Fabric, was a Danish pianist and composer.

== Biography ==
Bent Fabricius-Bjerre was born in Frederiksberg, Denmark. He started a jazz ensemble after World War II and founded a label, Metronome Records, in 1950. He released a series of ten inch albums on the Metronome label entitled 50 Years Of Evergreens in 1955, under the pseudonym Frank Barcley. However, he is best known for his 1961 instrumental Omkring et flygel (lit. 'Around a Grand Piano') which became a hit in Denmark. The song was re-released worldwide under the name "Alley Cat" on Atco Records the following year, and went to No. 1 in Australia and No. 49 in Germany. The tune also became a hit in the United States; the song hit No. 2 on the AC chart and no. 7 on the Billboard Hot 100, and the LP of the same name hit No. 13 on the Billboard 200. "Alley Cat" also won a Grammy Award for Best Rock & Roll Recording. It sold over one million copies, and was awarded a gold disc. The follow-up single, "Chicken Feed", hit No. 63 in the U.S.

Fabricius-Bjerre had done extensive work in film scores prior to the success of his singles, and continued to work in film for decades after. In 2003, Fabricius-Bjerre returned to the charts, this time in his native Denmark. He released the album Jukebox as Bent Fabric, where he worked with critically acclaimed Danish musicians, including Peter Frödin. The singles "Jukebox" hit No. 3 in Denmark and "Shake" hit No. 10 that year. In 2006, a remix of "Jukebox" was released, and the title track became a dance music hit, peaking at No. 7 on the US Dance/Club Play charts. The album was also re-released in the United States, this time featuring a remix of his famous instrumental song "Alley Cat", formerly known as “Omkring et flygel” (“Around a Piano”), among others.

In 2005 he released the compilation album, Kan du kende melodien (literally Do you recognize the melody) featuring some of his most famous and recognized film and TV scores.

In 2018, Bent Fabricius-Bjerre was honored for his long and active career by the naming of a new species of beetle †Cacomorphocerus bentifabrici (Fabrizio Fanti & Anders Leth Damgaard, 2018). Married thrice, he died on 28 July 2020.

== Film music ==
- Poeten og Lillemor (1958)
- Helle for Helene (1959)
- Forelsket i København (1960)
- Poeten og Lillemor og Lotte (1960)
- Cirkus Buster (1961)
- Flemming på kostskole (1961)
- Svinedrengen og prinsessen på ærten (1962)
- Poeten og Lillemor i forårshumør (1963)
- Tre piger i Paris (1963)
- Hvis lille pige er du? (1963)
- Halløj i himmelsengen (1964)
- Døden kommer til middag (1964)
- Pigen og millionæren (1965)
- Strike First Freddy (1965)
- Relax Freddy (1966)
- Olsen-banden (1968–1998)
- Olsenbanden (Norwegian, 1969–1999)
- Tænk på et tal (1969)
- Ballade på Christianshavn (1971)
- Flåklypa Grand Prix (Norwegian, 1975)
- Matador (TV series, 1978–1981)
- Min farmors hus (1984)
- Når engle elsker (1986)
- Peter von Scholten (1990)
- Lad isbjørnene danse (1990)
- Det skaldede spøgelse (1992)
- Blinkende lygter (2000)
- Olsen-banden Junior (2001)
- Klovn - The Movie (2010)

== Discography ==
=== Albums ===
- 1962 Alley Cat (Atco Records)
- 1962 The Happy Puppy (Atco Records)
- 1963 Piano Party with Bent Fabric (Columbia 33-OSX-7720)(Australia)
- 1964 Organ Grinder's Swing (Atco Records)
- 1964 The Drunken Penguin (Atco Records)
- 1965 Together! (with Acker Bilk) (Atco Records)
- 1966 Never Tease Tigers (Atco Records)
- 1967 Operation Lovebirds (Atco Records)
- 1968 Relax With Bent Fabric (Atco Records)
- 1997 The Very Best of Bent Fabric
- 1998 Klaver med mer (CMC Records)
- 2001 Mit livs melodi (Copenhagen Records)
- 2004 Jukebox (Universal)
- 2005 Kan du kende melodien (Universal)
- 2014 Bent Fabricius-Bjerre og Hans Musik (Warner Music)

=== Singles ===
Year	Title	Peak chart positions		Record Label	B-side	Album
Year	Title	US Pop	US AC	Record Label	B-side	Album
1962	"Alley Cat"	7	2	Atco	"Markin' Time"	Alley Cat
1962	"Chicken Feed"	63	16	Atco	"That Certain Party" (BB 117)	The Happy Puppy
1963	"The Happy Puppy"	102	—	Atco	"Sermonette"	
1964	"Goofus"	—	—	Atco	"Organ Grinder's Swing"	Organ Grinder's Swing
1965	"The Old Piano Roll Blues"	—	—	Atco	"Titena"	The Drunken Penguin
1965	"Alley Cat Dance"	—	—	Atco	"The Drunken Penguin"	
1966	"The Sweet Charity Theme"	—	—	Atco	"Can't You See"	
