= 1962 in Norwegian music =

The following is a list of notable events and releases of the year 1962 in Norwegian music.

== Events ==
=== May ===
- The 10th Bergen International Festival started in Bergen, Norway.

=== July ===
- The 2nd Moldejazz started in Molde, Norway.

== Deaths ==
March

- 20 – Johan Evje, composer and teacher (born 1874).

April

- 24 – Finn Bø, songwriter, revue writer, playwright, journalist and theatre critic (born 1893).

June

- 24 – Alf Andersen, flautist (born 1928).

December

- 7 – Kirsten Flagstad, operatic soprano (born 1895).

== Births ==
January

- 7 – Tor Haugerud, jazz drummer and percussionist (Transjoik, BOL).

February

- 25 – Snorre Bjerck, jazz percussionist and singer.

March

- 31 – Morten Mølster, guitarist, The September When (died 2013).

May

- 9 – Jon Klette, jazz saxophonist and label Jazzaway Records manager (died 2016).

October

- 3 – Torgeir Vassvik, Sami musician and composer.
- 12 – Mads Eriksen, guitarist and composer.
- 20 – Bendik Hofseth, jazz saxophonist, singer, and composer.
- 22 – Kjetil Saunes, bassist, composer, and songwriter.

November

- 1 – Magne Furuholmen, musician and visual artist.
- 17 – Ole Evenrud, pop artist and teenpop producer.

December

- 8 – Olaf Kamfjord, jazz bassist and composer.
- 15 – Nils Einar Vinjor, jazz guitarist and composer.

== See also ==
- 1962 in Norway
- Music of Norway
