= 1974 in Norwegian music =

The following is a list of notable events and releases of the year 1974 in Norwegian music.

== Events ==
=== January ===
- Inger Lise Rypdal and Benny Borg win the 1973 Spellemannprisen in the female and male vocalist categories respectively. Christiania Jazzband, Saft, Torkil Bye/Brynjar Hoff, Lillebjørn Nilsen, Bjørn Sand/Totto Osvold and Oddvar Nygaards Kvartett also receive the award. Dizzie Tunes win in the category "Music for children" and Sigbjørn Bernhoft Osa win the Special Award.

=== April ===
- 5 – The 1st Vossajazz started in Vossavangen, Norway (April 5 – 7).

=== May ===
- 22
  - The 22nd Bergen International Festival started in Bergen, Norway (May 22 – June 5).
  - The 2nd Nattjazz started in Bergen, Norway (May 22 – June 5).

=== August ===
- 25 – The 5th Kalvøyafestivalen started at Kalvøya near by Oslo.

== Albums released ==
=== Unknown date ===
B

Bendik Singers

- Bendik Singers (Triola Records)

F

Flying Norwegians

- New Day (Sonet Records)

G

Jan Garbarek

- Belonging (ECM Records) with Keith Jarrett

K

Karin Krog

- Gershwin With Karin Krog (Polydor Records).
- You Must Believe In Spring (Songs By Michel Legrand) (Polydor Records).
- We Could Be Flying (Polydor Records)

N

Lillebjørn Nilsen

- ...Og Fia Hadde Sko! (Polydor Records)

R

Inger Lise Rypdal

- Den Stille Gaten (Talent Records)

Terje Rypdal

- What Comes After (ECM Records)
- Whenever I Seem To Be Far Away (ECM Records)

S

Øystein Sunde

- Klå (Philips Records)
- Ikke Bare Tyll (Philips Records)

T

Arve Tellefsen

- Johan Svendsen: Fiolinkonsert, Op. 6 / Cellokonsert, Op. 7 (Norsk Kulturråds Klassikerserie), with Hege Waldeland (cello) and Filharmonisk Selskaps Orkester, Musikselskabet Harmoniens Orkester, conducted by Karsten Andersen

== Deaths ==
February

- 20 – David Monrad Johansen, composer (born 1888).

October

- 31 – Olav Gurvin, composer and music conductor (born 1893).

== Births ==
January

- 4
  - Sjur Miljeteig, jazztrumpeter, composer, and author.
  - Hild Sofie Tafjord, French hornist.
- 29 – Daniel "Vrangsinn" Salte, black metal bassist, Carpathian Forest.

February

- 3 – Anders Hunstad, musician and songwriter.
- 17 – Bernt Moen, jazz pianist, composer, and music teacher

March

- 27 – Lars Skoglund, contemporary classical composer, guitarist, and drummer.

April

- 1 – Ole Moe, black metal/thrash metal multi-instrumentalist, Aura Noir and Immortal.
- 4 – Lars Eikind, rock/ bassist and singer.
- 10 – Beate S. Lech, jazz singer, composer and lyricist.
- 14 – Christian Blom, composer.
- 29 – Børre Dalhaug, jazz drummer, music arranger and music instructor.

May

- 5 – Jens Fredrik Ryland, black metal guitarist, Borknagar.

June

- 9 – Tomas "Samoth" Thormodsæter Haugen, black metal guitarist and multi-instrumentalist.
- 11 – Frode Jacobsen, bass guitarist, songwriter and record producer.
- 15 – Øystein Greni, singer and guitarist, BigBang.

July

- 7
  - Kenneth Ekornes, jazz percussionist.
  - Terje "Tchort" Vik Schei, black metal guitarist, Emperor.
- 22 – Kåre Nymark, jazz trumpeter and composer.
- 24 – Carl-Michael Eide, black metal drummer, multi-instrumentalist, and vocalist.

August

- 5 – Knut Magne Valle, heavy metal guitarist, songwriter, composer.
- 23 – Ovidiu Cernăuțeanu, singer-songwriter, producer and musician.

September

- 10 – Lasse Marhaug, improvisational, jazz, rock and extreme metal electronic musician and music producer.
- 11 – Krister Dreyer, singer, songwriter and multi-instrumentalist.
- 15 – Erik Hedin, sound designer and composer.

October

- 7 – Frode Glesnes, Viking metal guitarist, Einherjer.

November

- 7 – Chris Summers, deathpunk drummer, Turbonegro.
- 12 – Jørn H. Sværen, author, publisher, translator and musician.
- 23 – Frode Kjekstad, jazz guitarist.
- 27 – Tom Cato Visnes, black metal bassist, Gorgoroth and Ov Hell.

December

- 17 – Anders Aarum, jazz pianist and composer.
- 18 – Knut Schreiner, singer, guitarist and music producer.
- 21 – Knut Aalefjær, jazz drummer and composer.
- 24 – Paal Nilssen-Love, jazz drummer.

Unknown date

- Henning Solvang, rock musician, Thulsa Doom.

== See also ==
- 1974 in Norway
- Music of Norway
- Norway in the Eurovision Song Contest 1974
