= 1880s in Danish music =

The following is a list of notable events that occurred in the 1880s in Danish music.

== New works ==
=== 1880 ===
- Niels Gade – Violin concerto in D minor

=== 1881 ===
- Niels Gade – Nye Aquareller for Pianoforte

== Births ==
- 6 July 1881 – Nancy Dalberg, Danish composer (died 1949)

== Deaths ==
- 24 September 1881 – Petrine Fredstrup, ballet dancer and teacher (born 1827)
