= Edmund Neupert =

Norwegian musician (1842–1888)

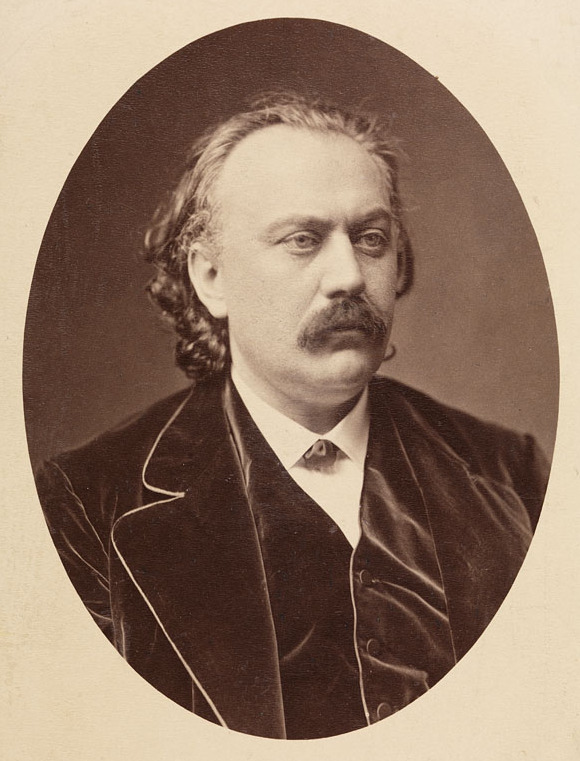
Portrait of Edmund Neupert

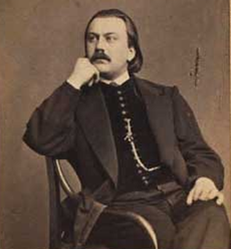
Edmund Neupert.

(Carl Fredrik) Edmund Neupert (1 April 1842 – 22 June 1888) was a Norwegian music teacher, pianist and composer. Among Neupert's compositions, the 24 Concert-Etüden and the 24 Octav-Etüden are especially highly regarded.

== Biography ==
Neupert was born on 1 April 1842, in Christiana (now Oslo), Norway. He was the son of Herman Wilhelm Neupert (1806–78) and Caroline Friederike Wiedmayer (1814–1878). His father was a musician and piano teacher.

He studied in Berlin at the Neue Akademie der Tonkunst under Theodor Kullak (1818–1882). He also received instruction from Friedrich Kiel (1821–1885). In 1866, he was hired as piano teacher at the Stern Conservatory in Berlin operated by Julius Stern (1820–1883). Neupert was a teacher at the Stern Conservatory from 1866 to 1868. He then moved to Copenhagen, where he held a position at the city's conservatory for two years. In 1881, he traveled to Moscow, and in 1882 he moved to Christiania, where he taught at a piano school for children. From 1883 he stayed in New York City.

He was now best remembered as the soloist at the world premiere of Edvard Grieg's Piano Concerto in A minor. This occurred on 3 April 1869 in the Casino Concert Hall in Copenhagen, with the Royal Danish Orchestra conducted by Holger Simon Paulli. The piano used for the performance was lent for the occasion by Anton Rubinstein, who attended the concert. Grieg himself was not present, due to commitments back home in Norway. Neupert was also the dedicatee of the second edition of the concerto (Rikard Nordraak was the original dedicatee), and was said to have actually composed the cadenza in the first movement.

== Family ==
In 1870, Neupert was married to Hilda Bergh (1848–1934) and the couple had one son Robert Isidor Neuper (1871–1894). He died on 22 June 1888, in New York City and was buried at Vår Frelsers gravlund in Oslo.

== Other sources ==
- Andrew Adams; Bradley Martin (2011) Forgotten Romantic:The Life and Works of Edmund Neupert International Edvard Grieg Society Research Conference at Copenhagen
