= Olav Gurvin =

Norwegian musicologist (1893–1974)

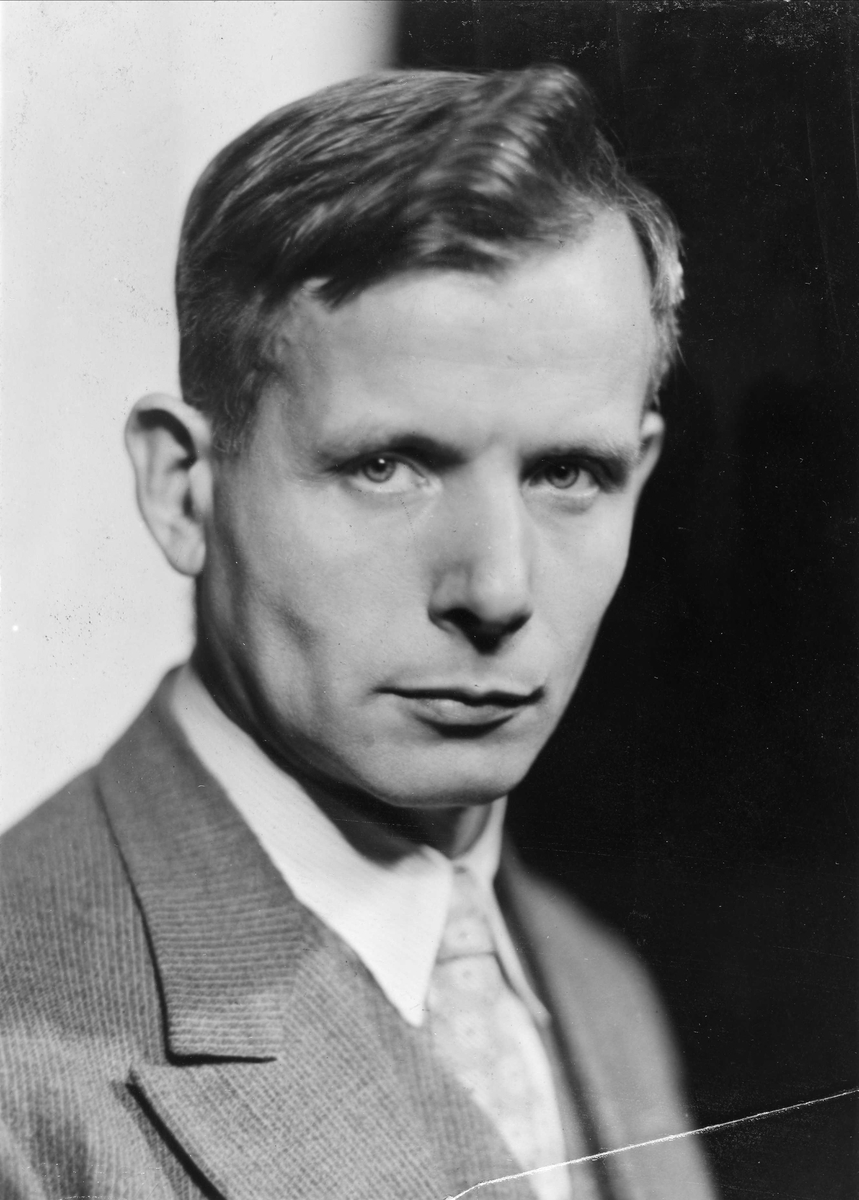
- Gurvin c. 1935.
- Born: 24 December 1893; Tysnes Municipality, Norway
- Died: 31 October 1974 (aged 80)
- Occupation: musicologist

Olav Gurvin (24 December 1893 Tysnes Municipality – 31 October 1974) was a Norwegian musicologist, a professor at the University of Oslo from 1957. He co-edited the first Norwegian music encyclopedia in 1949, and edited the magazine Norsk Musikkliv from 1942 to 1951.

== Personal life ==
Gurvin was born in Tysnes Municipality as the son of teacher Elling Olson Gurvin and Kristina Olsdatter Flugem. He married Dagny Siqveland in 1947.

== Career ==
Gurvin studied musicology at the Universities of Heidelberg and Berlin, and graduated from the University of Oslo in 1928. Between 1930 and 1947 he was a conductor for various choirs in Oslo. He delivered his doctoral thesis in 1938, titled Frå tonalitet til atonalitet. He lectured at the University of Oslo from 1937. He published the complete works of Rikard Nordraak works in 1942, in cooperation with Øyvind Anker.

During the occupation of Norway by Nazi Germany he was a member of the resistance movement, and from 1943 he represented musicians in the Coordination Committee's subgroup for culture.

He edited the magazine Norsk Musikkliv from 1942 to 1951, and was a music critic for the newspaper Verdens Gang from 1945 to 1958. Together with Øyvind Anker he also co-edited the first Norwegian music encyclopedia, titled Musikkleksikon and published in 1949.

His ethnomusicological studies in the 1950s resulted in the development of an electroacoustical apparatus for melody analysis. He was appointed professor in musicology from 1957. He edited the first five volumes of a series of string airs for Hardingfele, from 1958 to 1967. In 1962 he published a biography on Fartein Valen. He was decorated as a Knight, First Class of the Royal Norwegian Order of St. Olav in 1968.

== Selected works ==
- Frå tonalitet til atonalitet. Tonalitetsoppløysing og atonalitetsfesting. 1938. (thesis).
- Musikkleksikon. Oslo: Dreyers forlag. 1949. (Norway's first music encyclopedia. Co-editor with Øyvind Anker.)
- Norsk folkemusikk. Serie 1, Hardingfeleslåttar. (Book series on string airs for Hardingfele. Editor of five volumes from 1958 to 1967).
- Fartein Valen. En banebryter i nyere norsk musikk. 1962. (Biography of Fartein Valen).
