= Janet Achurch =

English stage actress

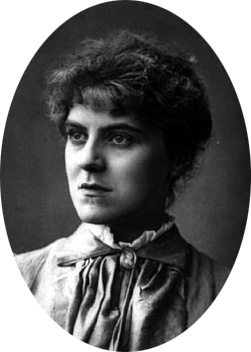
- Born: 17 January 1863; Chorlton-on-Medlock, Manchester, England
- Died: 11 September 1916 (aged 53); Ventnor, Isle of Wight, England
- Known for: English stage actress; Manager of the Novelty Theatre in London
- Notable work: acted in Betsy Baker (1883); played Nora in Ibsen's A Doll's House (1889); played title role in Candida (1897); played Merete in Hans Wiers-Jenssen's The Witch (1913)

Janet Achurch (17 January 1863 – 11 September 1916) was an English stage actress and actor-manager. She made her London debut in 1883. She played many Shakespearean roles, but is best known as a pioneer of major roles in the works of Ibsen and George Bernard Shaw. Her most notable role was as Nora in the first English production of A Doll's House (1889). She was married to actor Charles Charrington.

== Background ==
Born as Janet Sharp on 17 January 1863 in Chorlton-on-Medlock, Manchester, her mother died during childbirth and she was reared by her father William Prior Sharp, an insurance agent. Her maternal grandparents, James and Mary Achurch, managed the Theatre Royal in Manchester. She became an actress after ending her education in 1881 and joining Sarah Thorne's stock company in Margate.

== Career ==
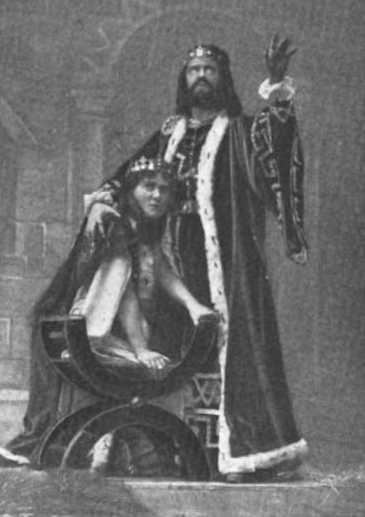
As Lady Macbeth, opposite William Mollison (producer) in 1898

Janet Achurch's first appearance on stage was in 1883 at the Olympic Theatre in London in the farcical Betsy Baker. From 1883 to her retirement in 1913, she appeared in a wide range of roles, in London, touring England, as well as Australia, New Zealand, India, and Egypt. In 1889 she took over management of the Novelty Theatre in London. That year she played one of her most notable roles as Nora in the English premiere of Ibsen's A Doll's House. This enhanced her own fame as well as Ibsen's standing in England.

George Bernard Shaw wrote the title role of his play Candida with her in mind and would only allow the play to be performed if Achurch played the title role, which took place in 1897 at Her Majesty's Theatre. In 1889, during her tour with her actor husband Charles Charrington in Egypt, she gave birth to a stillborn child in Cairo, almost dying herself during the birth. The lingering pains increased her addiction to morphine.

== Retirement and death ==
Her last performance was in 1913 as Merete Bery in Hans Wiers-Jenssen's The Witch. Due to exhaustion and illness, she declared her retirement as soon as the production closed. She died of "morphine poisoning" on 11 September 1916, aged 52, at Ventnor, Isle of Wight.

== Sources ==
- Ince, Bernard. (2006). "The Charringtons Off The Stage". Theatre Notebook. 60 (3): 175.
- Ince, Bernard. (2013). "Before Ibsen: The Early Stage Career of Janet Achurch". Theatre Notebook. 67 (2): 66–102.
- Morley, Malcolm (1966). Margate and its Theatres. London: Museum Press. p. 106.
