= Anizy-le-Château =

- Part of Anizy-le-Grand
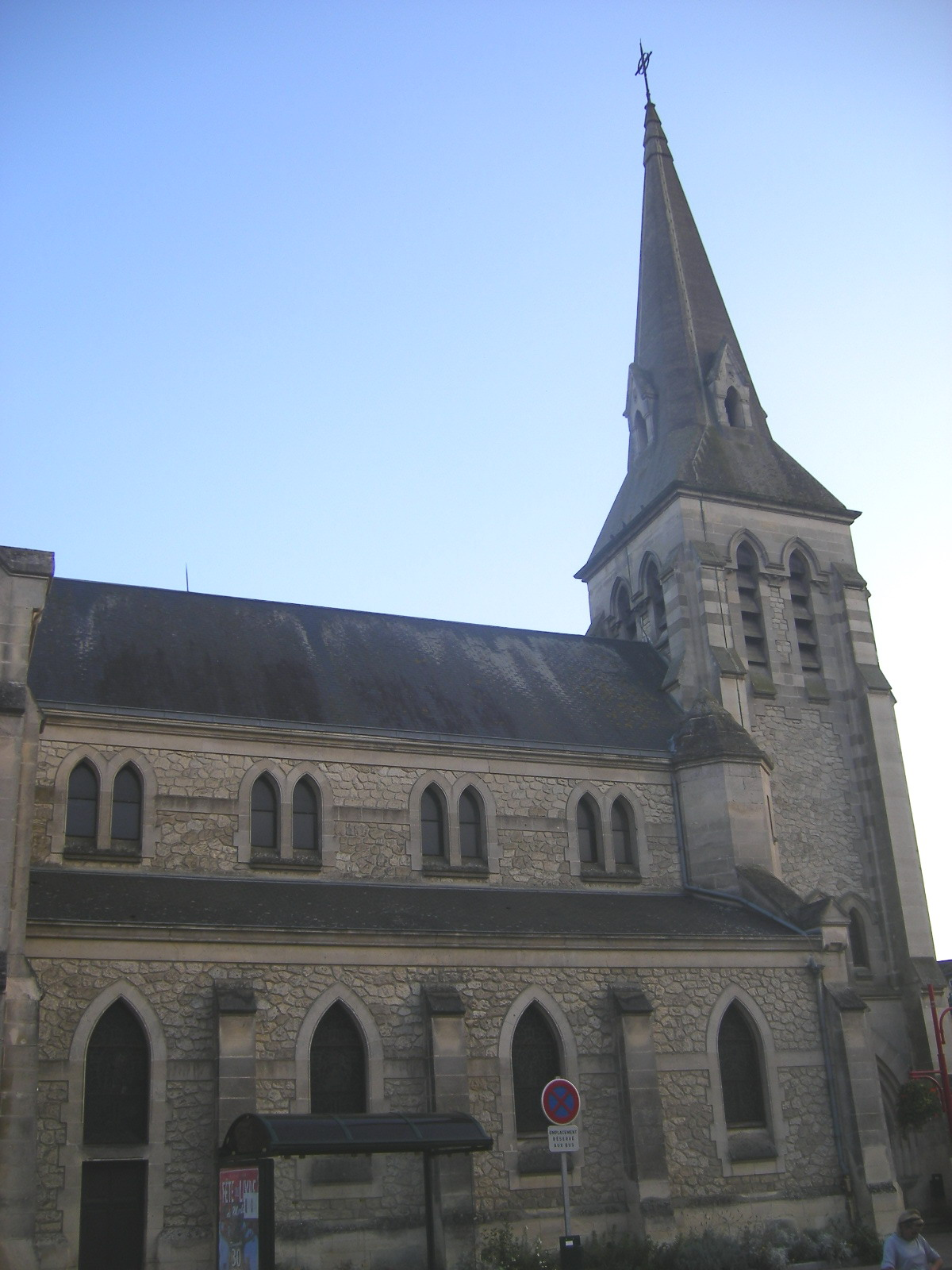
- The Commune church

- Coat of arms
- Location of Anizy-le-Château
- Location within France Location within Hauts-de-France
- Coordinates: 49°30′24″N 3°27′05″E
- Country: France
- Region: Hauts-de-France
- Department: Aisne
- Arrondissement: Laon
- Canton: Laon-1
- Commune: Anizy-le-Grand
- Area^{1}: 9.49 km^{2} (3.66 sq mi)
- Elevation: 70 m (230 ft)
- Highest elevation: 166 m (545 ft)
- Lowest elevation: 52 m (171 ft)
- Population (2021): 1,961
  - Density: 207/km^{2} (535/sq mi)
- Time zone: UTC+01:00 (CET)
  - Summer (DST): UTC+02:00 (CEST)
- Postal code: 02320
- ^{1} French Land Register data, which excludes lakes, ponds, glaciers > 1 km^{2} (0.386 sq mi or 247 acres) and river estuaries.

Anizy-le-Château (French pronunciation: [anizi l(ə) ʃato]; lit. 'Anizy-the-Castle') is a former commune in the Aisne department in the Hauts-de-France region of northern France. On 1 January 2019, it was merged into the new commune of Anizy-le-Grand.

== Geography ==
Anizy-le-Chateau is located some 40 km south by south-east of Saint Quentin and 20 km south-west of Laon. The commune is accessed by the D5 road from Chivy-les-Etouvelles which passes west through the village then continues north through Brancourt-en-Laonnois. The D14 road comes from Pinon in the south in a north-west direction intersecting the D5 west of the village. Also from Pinon is the D26 which runs north directly to the village. The D265 also comes from Wissignicourt in the north and the D26 runs north-east from the village to Faucoucourt. The town urbane area covers some 15% of the commune with the rest being farmland and a large forest in the south-west.

The Ailette flows along the southern border of the commune to the west and parallel to the Canal de l'Oise à l'Aisne. The Ru du Bordet flows south-west through the commune from Brancourt-en-Laonnois to the Ailette river. There is a network of ponds and reservoirs in the south-east of the commune near the river. The Fosse du Marais forms part of the eastern border of the commune and also flows into the Ailette.

== History ==
The commune was given by Clovis I to Saint Remi who in turn gave it to the Bishop of Laon. The county was created in 1397 by Charles VI in favour of Jean de Roucy, the Bishop of Laon. These bishops built a mighty castle which was rebuilt in the 16th century by the Cardinal de Bourbon and rebuilt again in the 18th century by Monseigneur de Rochechouart who also paved the whole town.

=== Heraldry ===
Arms of Anizy-le-Château	Blazon: Azure, Semé-de-lis of Or debruised by a cross Argent, a crozier in gules surmounted in chief by a small inescutcheon azure with a fleur de lys of Or, over all 2 keys azure saltirewise.

== Administration ==
List of Successive Mayors of Anizy-le-Château

From	To	Name	Party	Position
2001	2008	Michel Reb	PS	Retired Vetterinarian
2008	2014	Fabrice Langlet		
2014	31 December 2018	Ambroise Centonze-Sandras		

== Population ==
The inhabitants of the commune are known as Aniziens or Aniziennes in French.

Historical population
Year	Pop.	±% p.a.
2006	1,900	—
2011	1,912	+0.13%
2015	1,956	+0.57%
2021	1,961	+0.04%
Source: INSEE

== Sites and Monuments ==
- The Park is registered as an historical monument.
- The Church contains three items which are registered as historical objects:
  - A Commemorative plaque of a donation by the Cardinal of Rochechouart (1770)
  - A Painting: Portrait of Cardinal Rochechouart (1777)
  - The Tombstone of Claude Allongé, Count of Anizy and recipient of the episcopate. (1724)

== Notable People linked to the commune ==
- Albert-Ernest Carrier-Belleuse
- Geoffroy de Billy, died in Anizy castle

Works by Albert-Ernest Carrier-Belleuse

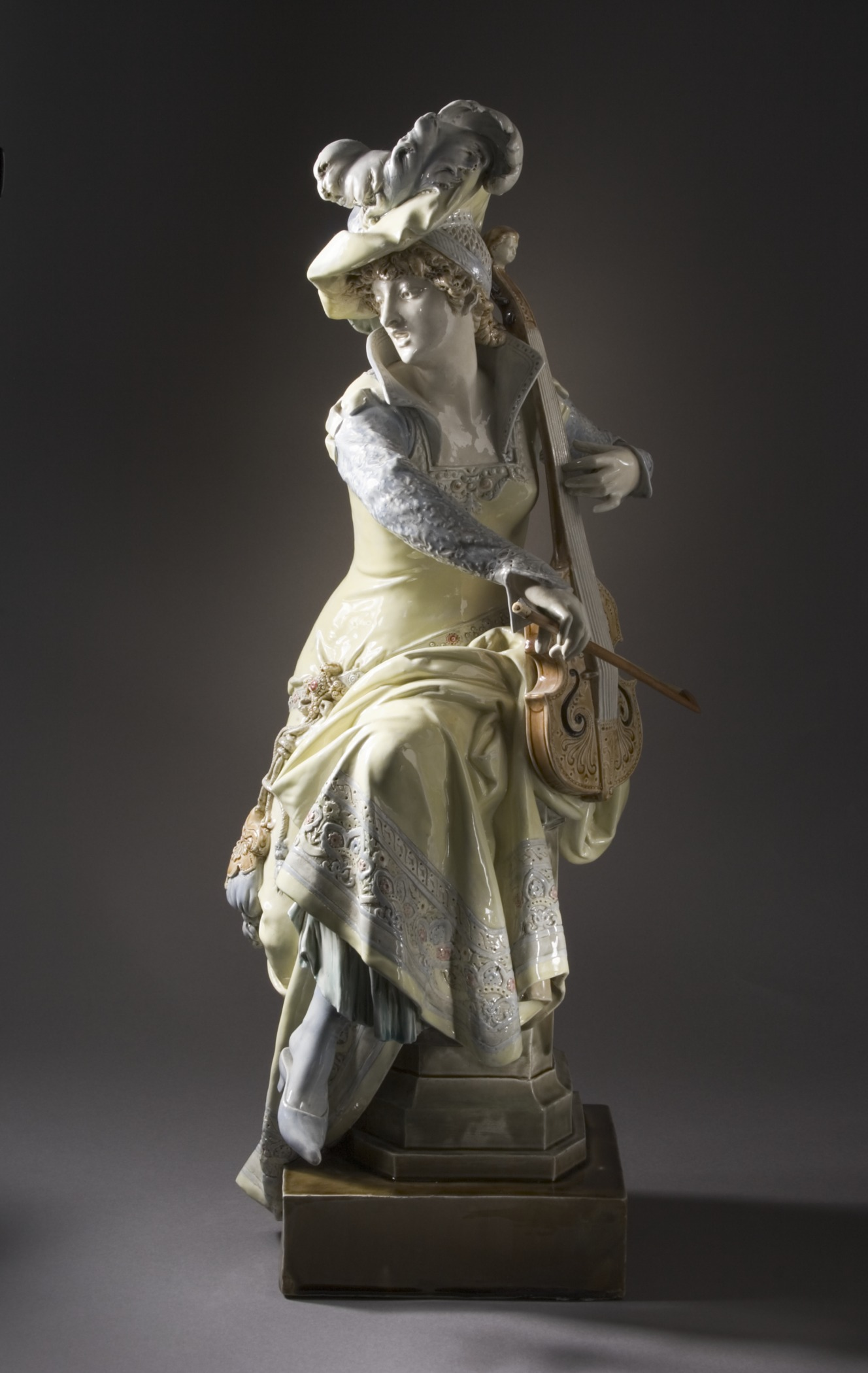
Woman Playing a Viola da Gamba (Circa 1880–1897)

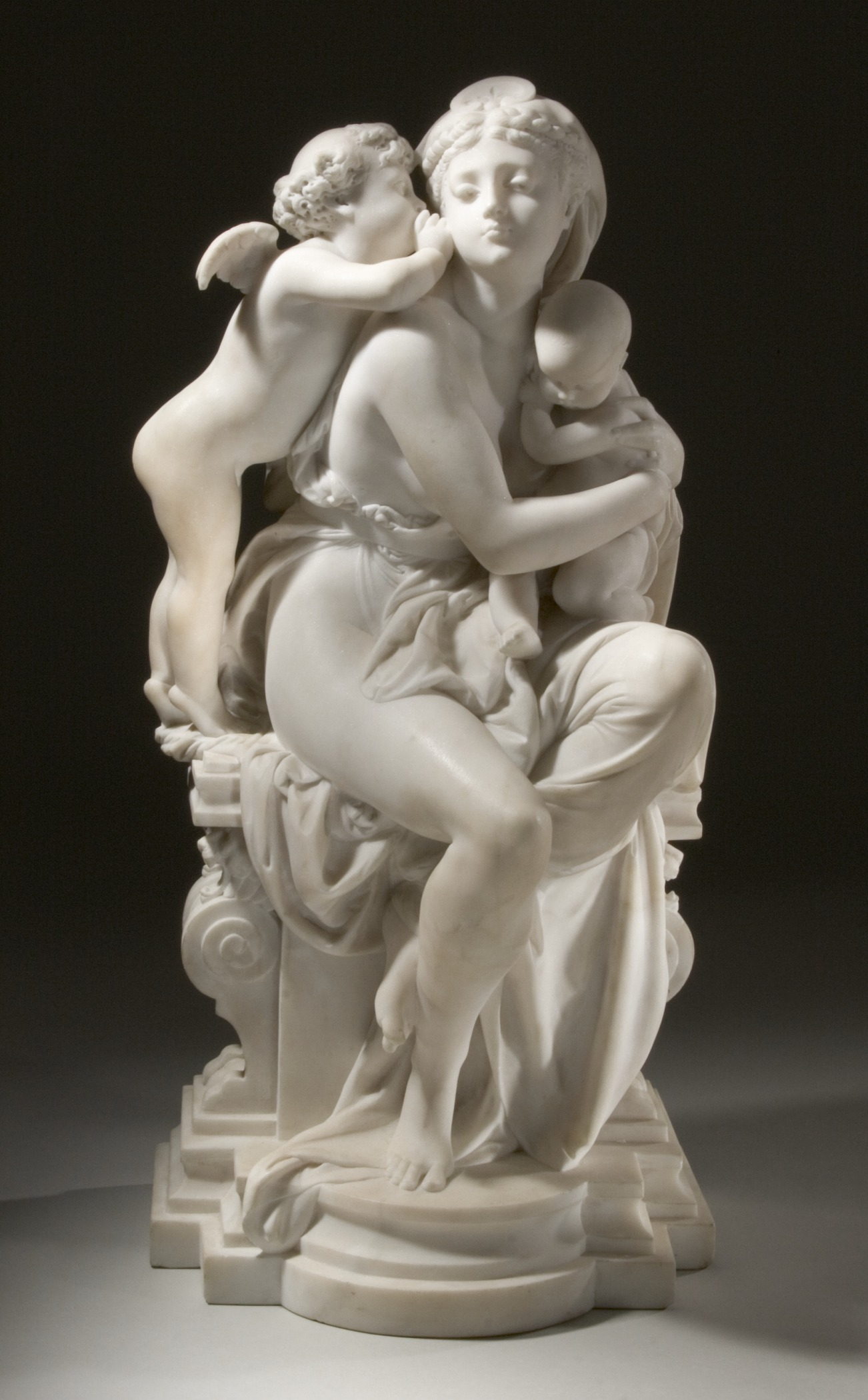
Between Two Loves, 1867

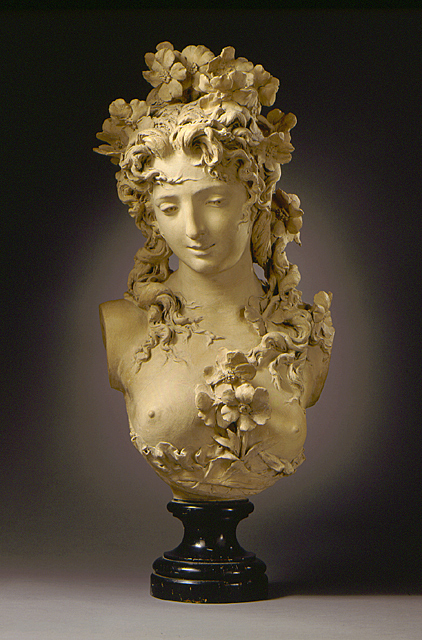
Fantasy Bust (Circa 1865–1870)

== See also ==
- Communes of the Aisne department

=== External links ===
- Anizy-le-Château official website (in French)
- Anizy-le-Château on Géoportail, National Geographic Institute (IGN) website (in French)
- Anizy-le-Château on the 1750 Cassini Map
