= Edvard Bræin =

Norwegian composer, conductor and organist

Edvard Bræin (3 April 1887 - 20 September 1957) was a Norwegian organist, composer, and orchestra conductor, the father of the composer Edvard Fliflet Bræin (1924–76).

== Biography ==
Bræin was born in Kristiansund, and was married to Magnhild Fliflet (1899–1967). He got his musical education at the Conservatory of Music in Oslo (1906–09), and debuted as organist in 1905. He earned his organist exam in 1907 and debuted as orchestra conductor in 1909. Bræin studied music under Bernhard Heinrich Irrgang and Jean Paul Ertel in Berlin (1910–11). He was organist in Ormøens Church, Østre Aker (1907–12), and organist in Kristiansund from 1912. In 1919 Bræin was conductor of the Kristiansund Symphony Orchestra. He was also conductor of several choirs in the Kristiansund area. He received state aid for collecting folk music, published in 10 pamphlets, Folk music from Nordmøre (1930–40). Composed music for Choir and Orchestra, including Serenade for Bratsj and orchestra (performed in 1943), and a number of songs.

== Works ==
- Released songs for mixed choirs and men's chorus, of which "Vuggevise" received awards
- Cantatas and works for the orchestra
- Listed folk music of Nordmøre, of which 10 published pamphlets
- Conducted Kristiansund Symphony Orchestra and Bræin's Choir
- Has guest conducted in Filharmonisk Selskab, Oslo, the Bergen Philharmonic Orchestra, and in Sweden
- Given a host of organ concerts
- Led the performance of several orchestras and operas in Kristiansund
