= Franz Sauer =

Former Austrian organist and music educator

Franz Sauer (11 March 1894 – 28 October 1962) was an Austrian organist and music educator.

== Life ==
Born in the Bielitz-Bialaer Sprachinsel in Austrian Silesia, Sauer learned music from his father at a very early age. He began with violin and piano and found his way to organ at the age of ten. He continued his education in Ziegenhals at the teacher training seminar and at the Berlin University of the Arts (with Bernhard Heinrich Irrgang) and the church music school in Regensburg. Sauer had his first position as choir director and organist in Kolsko. In 1914 he applied for the position of first Salzburg Cathedral organist. During his probationary period there in 1915 he began to work at the Mozarteum University Salzburg, teaching organ, theory and choral singing. In 1916 he officially became Organist of the Salzburg Cathedral.

In 1925 Sauer became a regular professor at the Mozarteum, which he also headed temporarily from 1938 to 1939. Other positions he held were choir master of the Salzburger Männergesangsverein (1920-1939) and first choir master of the Salzburger Liedertafel (1939–1946 and 1948–1952). As organist he also toured Germany and Italy. He remained cathedral organist in Salzburg until his death there in 1962 at the age of 68.

== Publications ==
- Handbuch der Orgelliteratur (1924)
- Memoria Jerusalem : Freundesgabe Franz Sauer zum 70. Geburtstag.
