= Frou-Frou (play) =

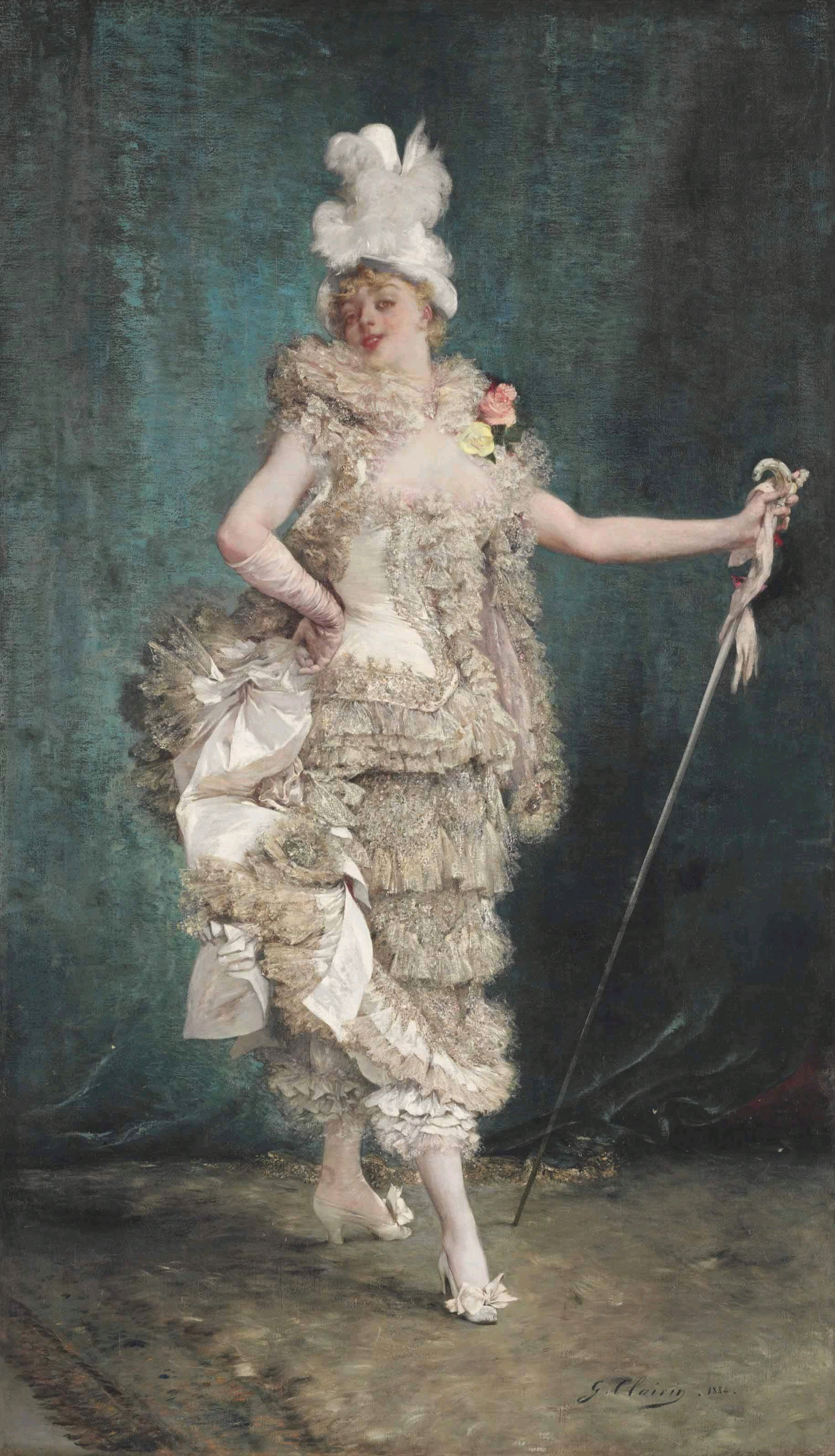
Georges-Jules-Victor Clairin. "Frou Frou", 1882. Clairin's painting is said to be inspired by Sarah Bernhardt's interpretation of the part, though it is not a portrait of her.

Frou-Frou is an English adaptation of a French comedic play of the same name written by Henri Meilhac and Ludovic Halévy. The title role has been played by many actors, notably Sarah Bernhardt, Madame Modjeska, and Ellen Terry.

The French expression frou-frou refers to the rustle of silk, perhaps onomatopoeic, hence a fondness for fine clothing.

== History ==
The original play, often spelled Froufrou, was written in five acts by Henri Meilhac and Ludovic Halévy in 1869, exclusively for Mlle Aimée Desclée (1836–1874), opening at the Gymnase Dramatique, Paris, on 31 October of that same year.

== The story ==
M. de Sartorys, a shy and dignified diplomat, is in love with Gilberte Brigard, the beautiful but self-absorbed "Frou-Frou" of the title. Gilberte's sister, Louise, rather fancies Sartorys herself, but selflessly plays matchmaker and the two get married. Four years later Gilberte, who has had a child, falls for the charming rake De Valreas, a friend and accomplice of her libertine father. The two depart for Venice, leaving the child in the care of Louise who has been managing the household. Sartorys and Louise are happy in each other's company, and Gilberte, returning briefly, is jealous: "My husband and child – you have taken them from me — well you can have them!" In the last scene Gilberte's money is finished and De Valreas gone. Sartorys finds him and kills him in a duel. Gilberte begs forgiveness but it is too late, she is dying, babbling incoherently about roses and ballgowns.

== Adaptations ==
An English translation by Sutherland Edwards of the Pall Mall Gazette, was produced at the Olympic Theatre, London. It was brought to Australia by Daniel E. Bandmann. It opened at the Prince of Wales Opera House, Sydney on 26 September 1870 with Mrs Bandmann in the role of Gilberte Brigard. Mary Gladstane had been playing a different variation of the same play in Melbourne. Her variation of the play opened that same night at the Victoria Theatre in Sydney. One folded after four nights and the other barely lasted a week. Neither production made money. Critics considered the play unworthy of either actress.

A later adaptation, by J. Comyns Carr, opened in Glasgow in September 1879, with Miss Ellen Terry in the title role. In 1881, Modjeska appeared at the Princess's Theatre, London in a revised version also by Carr. This adaptation is believed to be the one presented in Sydney on 26 July 1890 at the Criterion Theatre when Janet Achurch played Gilberte and Charles Charrington (in real life husband of Janet Achurch) took the part of Monsieur Brigard.
