= Johan Henrik Wiers-Jenssen =

Norwegian columnist and theatre director

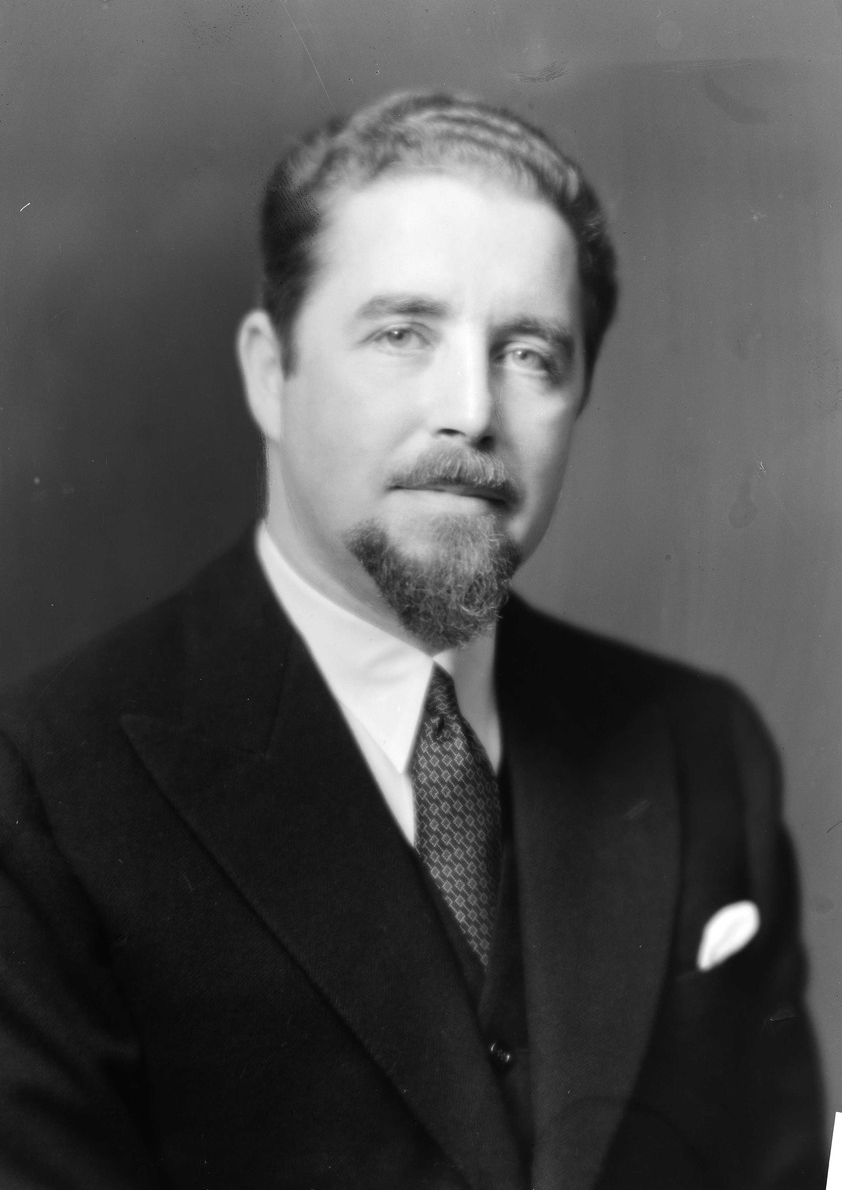
- Johan Henrik Wiers-Jenssen in 1934
- Born: 30 April 1897; Kristiania, Norway
- Died: 23 March 1951 (aged 53); New York City
- Occupations: Newspaper columnist Theatre director
- Spouse: Anne-Lise Wang
- Parent: Hans Wiers-Jenssen

Johan Henrik "Johe" Wiers-Jenssen (30 April 1897 – 23 March 1951) was a Norwegian newspaper columnist and theatre director.

== Biography ==
He was born in Kristiania as the son of novelist, playwright and stage producer Hans Wiers-Jenssen (1866–1925) and author Rigmor Nicolowna Danielsen (1874-1934). Wiers-Jenssen was columnist for Aftenposten from 1917 to 1925, signing with the pseudonyms Johe and Gamin. He was manager of the cabaret Chat Noir in Oslo from 1926 to 1934, theatre director at the National Theatre from 1934 to 1935, and again manager of Chat Noir from 1935 to 1951. He issued the collection Gamins epistler in 1921. His book Hva jeg vet om kvinden (What I Know About the Woman, 1932) consisted of 100 empty pages in nice leather binding. He died in March 1951 in New York City.

== Personal life ==
His first wife was Tordis Brekke (1870–1939), whom he married in 1919; his second wife was the actress Anne-Lise Wang (1920–1967), whom he married in 1948.

Cultural offices
Preceded by Anton Rønneberg (acting)	Director of the National Theatre; 1934–1935	Succeeded by Axel Otto Normann
