= Edvard Fliflet Bræin =

Norwegian composer and conductor

- Born: 23 August 1924; Kristiansund, Norway
- Died: 30 April 1976 (aged 51)
- Occupations: Composer and conductor
- Parent: Edvard Bræin

Edvard Fliflet Bræin (23 August 1924 – 30 April 1976) was a Norwegian composer and conductor. He is best remembered for the composition Ut mot havet and the opera Anne Pedersdotter.

== Personal life ==
Bræin was born in Kristiansund as the son of composer, conductor and organist Edvard Bræin (1887–1957) and his wife Magnhild Fliflet. He married Karen Torjusen in 1946.

== Career ==
Bræin studied at the institution Musikkonservatoriet i Oslo from 1942 to 1945, and musical composition with Bjarne Brustad and conducting with Odd Grüner-Hegge. His debut as conductor was in Bergen in 1947, with Musikselskabet Harmoniens orkester. His first compositions were De glade musikanter and Konsertouverture from 1948. He studied composition with Jean Rivier in Paris from 1950 to 1951.

Bræin wrote symphonies, compositions for piano and orchestra, for flute and orchestra, chamber music and operas. His first symphony was finished in 1950, his second in 1954, and his third in 1968. His best-known composition is Ut mot havet from 1964, originally a song melody (with lyrics by Henrik Straumsheim), and later versions include an arrangement for orchestra, a piano version, and several choir versions. He has further composed melodies for songs with lyrics by Einar Skjæraasen, Jakob Sande, Hartvig Kiran and Johan Herman Wessel.

He composed two operas. The opera Anne Pedersdotter was first performed at Den Norske Opera in 1971. It has a libretto by Hans Kristiansen based on a play by Hans Wiers-Jenssen, which was inspired by the witch trial in 1590 against Anne Pedersdotter, the widow of priest Absalon Pederssøn Beyer. The comic opera Den Stundesløse, finished in 1975, is based on a comedy by Ludvig Holberg.

== Selected compositions ==
Opera

- Anne Pedersdotter, opera in 4 acts, Op. 18 (1971); libretto by Hans Kristiansen after the play by Hans Wiers-Jensen
- Den Stundesløse (The Fidget), Op. 21 (1975)

Orchestral

- Concert Overture, Op. 2 (1948)
- Symphony No. 1, Op. 4 (1950)
- Serenade, Op. 5 (1951–1952)
- Adagio for string orchestra, Op. 6 (1953)
- Symphony No.2, Op. 8 (1954)
- Symfonisk forspill (Symphonic Prelude), Op. 11 (1959)
- Largo for string orchestra, Op. 12 (1961)
- Liten Ouverture (Ouverture in Miniature), Op. 14
- Symphony No. 3, Op. 16 (1968)
- Ritmico e melodica, Op. 19 (1971)
- Havljom, Concert Overture, Op. 20 (1973)

Concertante

- Serenade for viola and orchestra (1947)
- Capriccio for piano and orchestra, Op. 9 (1958)
- Concertino for flute and orchestra, Op. 10

Chamber music

- The Merry Musicians for clarinet, violin, viola and cello, Op. 1 (1947)
- Divertimento for clarinet, violin, viola and cello, Op. 13 (1962)
- Trio for violin, viola and cello, Op. 15 (1964)

Piano

- 2 Klaverstykker (2 Piano Pieces)
- Bånsull og Scherzo, Op. 7

Vocal

- Einsleg for voice and orchestra, Op. 3
- Two Songs for voice and piano, Op. 17 (1968)
- Ut mot havet, Song for medium voice and piano; words by Henrik Straumsheim
