= Anne-Lise Wang =

Norwegian actress (1920–1967)

Anne Lise Wang
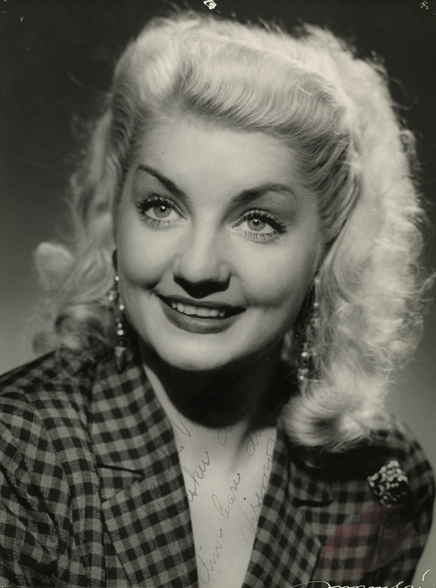
- Anne-Lise Wang in the 1950s
- Born: March 3, 1920; Kristiania (now Oslo), Norway
- Died: March 20, 1967 (aged 47); Hammerfest, Norway
- Occupation: Actress
- Spouse: Johan Henrik Wiers-Jenssen

Anne-Lise Wang (March 2, 1920 – March 20, 1967) was a Norwegian actress.

== Career ==
Wang performed at Chat Noir and the Oslo New Theater. She also appeared in seven feature films between 1942 and 1958.

== Personal life ==
Wang was born in Kristiania (now Oslo), Norway. She was the daughter of Fritz Wang (1888–1952) and Hertha Olsen (1891–1959). In 1948 she became the second wife of the theatre director Johan Henrik Wiers-Jenssen. Wang died of heart failure at age 47 in Hammerfest, Norway.

== Filmography ==
- 1942: Det æ'kke te å tru as Vera
- 1946: Et spøkelse forelsker seg as Tyttebæret
- 1947: Sankt Hans fest as Emma Sørensen
- 1953: Brudebuketten as a model
- 1954: I moralens navn as Agathe Mowitz, Alf's wife
- 1957: Fjols til fjells as the model Mona Miller
- 1958: Bustenskjold as a hotel guest
