= Lizy, Aisne =

Lizy
- Part of Anizy-le-Grand
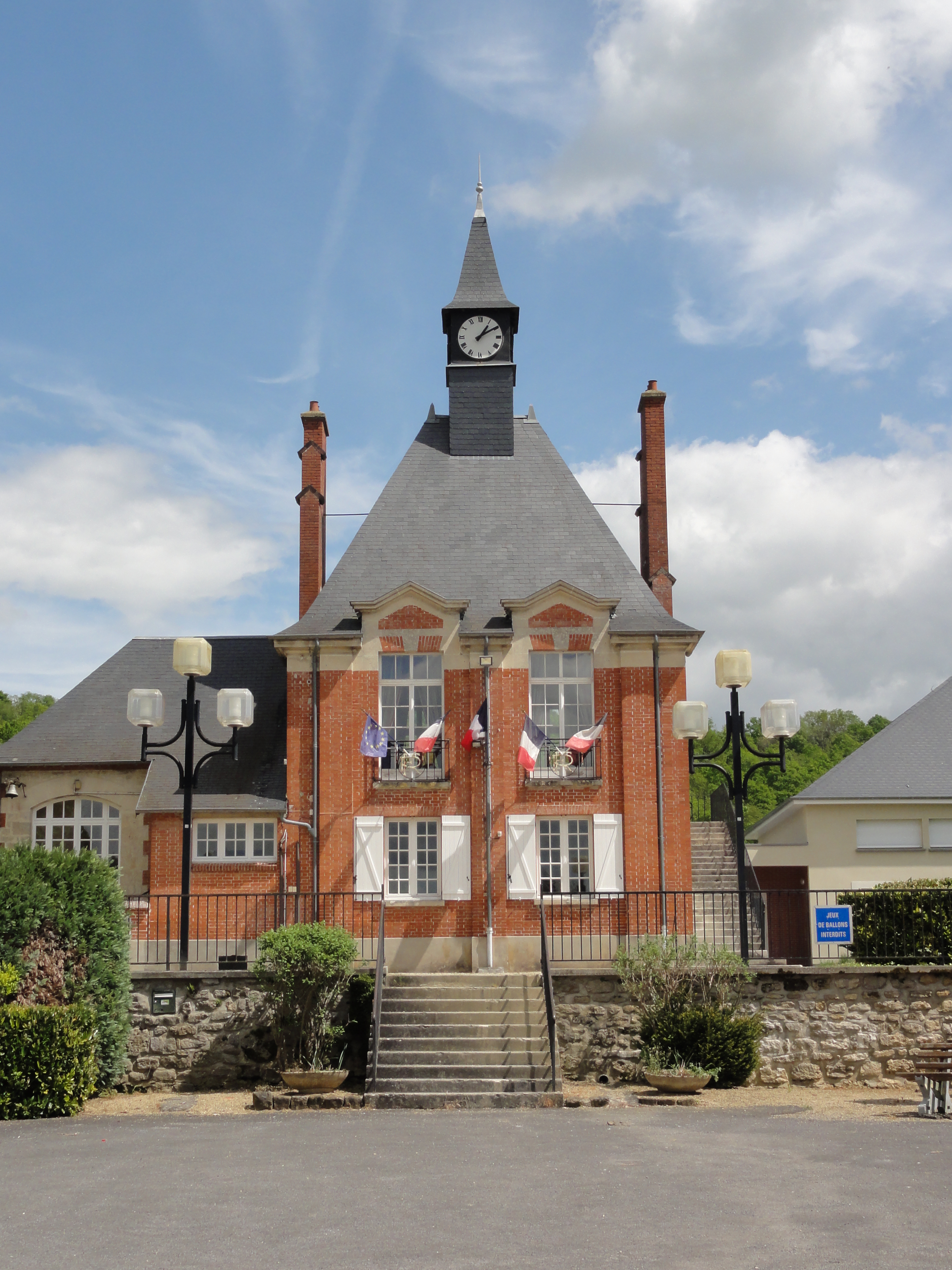
- The town hall of Lizy
- Location of Lizy
- Location within France Location within Hauts-de-France
- Coordinates: 49°30′50″N 3°28′59″E
- Country: France
- Region: Hauts-de-France
- Department: Aisne
- Arrondissement: Laon
- Canton: Laon-1
- Commune: Anizy-le-Grand
- Area^{1}: 3.73 km^{2} (1.44 sq mi)
- Elevation: 85 m (279 ft)
- Highest elevation: 170 m (560 ft)
- Lowest elevation: 58 m (190 ft)
- Population (2021): 290
  - Density: 78/km^{2} (200/sq mi)
- Time zone: UTC+01:00 (CET)
  - Summer (DST): UTC+02:00 (CEST)
- Postal code: 02320
- ^{1} French Land Register data, which excludes lakes, ponds, glaciers > 1 km^{2} (0.386 sq mi or 247 acres) and river estuaries.

Lizy (French pronunciation: [lizi]) is a former commune in the Aisne department in Hauts-de-France in northern France. On 1 January 2019, it was merged into the new commune of Anizy-le-Grand.

== Geography ==
The river Ailette forms all of the commune's southern border.

== Population ==
Historical population
Year	Pop.	±% p.a.
2006	223	—
2011	275	+4.28%
2015	266	−0.83%
2021	290	+1.45%
Source: INSEE

== See also ==
- Communes of the Aisne department
