= Charles Charrington =

British actor and barrister

Charles Charrington Martin (1854 – 1926), often known as Charles Charrington, but at times as Charles Martin, was a British actor and barrister.

Charrington studied law at the University of Cambridge, and became a barrister. He also worked as an actor, and married Janet Achurch, who worked in the profession. In 1889, they took over the management of the Novelty Theatre, putting on and performing in the first professional English language production of Henrik Ibsen's play, A Doll's House.

Charrington also became politically active, standing for the Progressive Party in the 1898 London County Council election, and for the Chelsea Vestry in 1899.

Charrington joined the Fabian Society in 1895, and served on its executive committee from 1899 until 1904. That year, he moved away from London to focus his time on acting, but in 1907 he returned.

Charrington and Achurch played together in Frou-Frou which toured Australia in 1890.
