= Anne Pedersdotter =

Alleged Norwegian witch

Anne Pedersdotter (c. 1530 – died 7 April 1590) was a Norwegian woman who was accused of being a witch. Her case was one of the most documented of the many witchcraft trials in Norway in the 16th and 17th centuries. Together with Lisbeth Nypan, she was perhaps the most famous victim of the accusation in Norway.

== Biography ==
Anne Pedersdotter was born in the first half of the 1500s in Trondheim, Norway, the daughter of an official. She was also the sister of Søren Pederssøn, who later became a judge in Trondheim. In 1552, she married Absalon Pederssøn Beyer (1528-75), a fellow student of her brother's from Copenhagen who was a humanist, Lutheran clergyman, and theological lecturer at the Latin school in Bergen, where they lived. They had eight children, of which only three survived to adulthood. Her husband died in April 1575.

== First accusation ==
In the final years of her husband Absalon Pedersson Beyer's life, Anne Pedersdotter was accused of witchcraft for the first time. The allegations claimed that she had murdered her husband's uncle, Bishop Gjeble Pederssøn, in order to pave the way for her husband to become a bishop. This accusation took place during a power struggle between the clergy and the bourgeoisie, with Absalon Pedersson Beyer being a prominent representative of the clergy. He managed to obtain a letter of acquittal from King Frederick II to clear his wife's name.

After Beyer's death, Anne Pedersdotter received a letter exempting her from taxes and allowing her to settle anywhere in the country. Despite this promising turn of events, the witchcraft accusations had taken a toll on her. She became bitter and withdrawn, and rumors persisted despite her acquittal. She responded to the gossip and accusations with cursing and quarreling, getting into arguments with neighbors and those around her. While her reactions may have indicated her strength and independence, they weakened her position as a widow compared to her former position as a priest's wife. Unfortunately, she was already regarded as a witch, and her isolation only intensified as the rumors about her continued to circulate.

== Other accusations ==
At the beginning of 1590, the accusations and rumors turned into serious charges, and in March, Anne Pedersdotter was again accused of witchcraft. The main accuser was the barber Adrian von Buskskott after his son Hans Rønnepog had courted Anne's daughter Susanne. The barber family did not want their son married into a family where there had been rumors of witchcraft about the housewife. When the trial opened on 23 March 1590, she was sick and her son Absalon Absalonsøn represented her instead. It was suggested to imprison Anne Pedersdotter, which Absalon Absalonsøn opposed. He referred to the letter from 10 December 1575 from the king, stating that she had already been acquitted of such accusations, but the jury found the acquittal letter irrelevant, as the accusations against her were more recent. She was therefore imprisoned in the town hall cellar.

In the trial, many testified about her witchcraft activities. She was accused of killing five to six people, including a small child, by casting sickness upon them. She was also accused of killing a pear tree.

Many of the witnesses were close friends and neighbors. Her servant of 20 years, Elina, made some of the most serious accusations. Anne Pedersdotter was said to have used her as a ride when flying through the air to witch gatherings on Lyderhorn and Fløyen. She was said to have participated in the witch gatherings on Lyderhorn three Christmas nights in a row. There, witchcraft actions against Bergen city were planned; "natural disasters, fire, and other devilishness". This was only prevented by a white angel intervening, and all that was heard were some violent thunderclaps. Other witnesses claimed that Anne Pedersdotter had been observed together with demons, including a creature without a head. Pedersdotter defended herself well; she "displayed willpower, clearsighted, and skill”. Against the accusations of killing a child, she said that "many children die in the city, I haven't killed them all".

== Verdict ==
Despite protests and support from several of the city's priests, Anne Pedersdotter was sentenced to death by burning at the stake. The sentence was signed with 37 seals from the city's secular elite, led by the lawspeaker, mayor, and city council members. On her way to the execution site, Anne repeatedly cried out her innocence, but she was burned at the stake at the execution site on Nordnes on 7 April 1590. The verdict is printed in the Bergen Historical Society's writings No. 36.

== Aftermath ==
After Anne Pedersdotter's execution, it led to a conflict between the citizens and parts of the clergy in Bergen. It also brought shame to the family's reputation. Therefore, the family reopened the case in 1596, but the decision of the Herredag (the highest court of the time) in 1598 upheld the verdict. The verdict started a witch-hunt in Norway, which particularly manifested itself in Finnmark a few decades later.

The family was devastated by how the verdict had destroyed their reputation, and as a result, they "were despised and scorned by everyone". Some years later, Anne's daughter Cecilien and son-in-law Werner Schellenberger traveled to Copenhagen with a letter to Christian IV, asking for the verdict to be overturned as unjust and harmful to the family. The son-in-law insisted that it was the governor of Bergenhus who, out of old hatred towards Anne Pedersdotter, had pressured the law speaker (a type of judge) and the city council to sentence her as a witch in 1590. However, the king still denied her compensation in 1598.

== Legacy ==
Anne Pedersdotter, a drama in four acts by Norwegian playwright, Hans Wiers-Jenssen was performed in 1909. This inspired La fiamma (1934) an opera by Italian composer Ottorino Respighi and the film Day of Wrath (1943) directed by Danish filmmaker Carl Theodor Dreyer. Pedersdotter was also the subject of Anne Pedersdotter, an opera by Norwegian composer Edvard Fliflet Bræin with libretto by Hans Kristiansen. In 1977, Norwegian author Vera Henriksen released the novel Skjærsild featuring aspects of the story.

A memorial stone titled the Witch Stone (Heksesteinen på Nordnes) was erected as a monument to the victims of witch trials in Norway. It was unveiled on 26 June 2002 at Nordnesparken in the Nordnes neighborhood of Bergen. The inscription translates to 350 bonfire victims to miscarriage of justice 1550–1700.

The 2009 album "Throw Money" by independent musician Kevin Loy features the composition Suite: Anne Pedersdotter.

The Norwegian band Kvelertak wrote a song titled Witch Burning (Heksebrann) for their 2016 album Nattesferd. The circumstances around Anne Pedersdotter are described in the song.

== See also ==
- Vardø Witch Trials

== Sources ==
- Gilje, Nils (2003) Heksen og humanisten : Anne Pedersdatter og Absalon Pederssøn Beyer (Bergens historiske forenings) ISBN 978-82-45010-54-1
- Hagen, Rune Blix (2003) Hekser. Fra forfølgelse til fortryllelse (Oslo: Humanist Forlag AS) ISBN 978-82-92622-63-6
- Willumsen, Liv Helene (2013) Witches of the North. Scotland and Finnmark (Boston, MA Brill) ISBN 978-9004252912

== Related reading ==
- Pavlac, Brian A. (2010) Witch Hunts in the Western World (University of Nebraska Press Bison Books) ISBN 978-0803232907
