= Thorkild Roose =

Danish actor and theatre director

Thorkild Roose (8 October 1874 – 6 June 1961) was a Danish actor and theatre director.

== Early life ==
Born Anders Torkel Roose in Kolding, he was the son of merchant Christian Roose (died 1923) and his wife Lisette Larsen (died 1927). He graduated in Kolding in 1894, the year after cand. phil., and was a merchant training in Antwerp in order to take over his father's grocery store in Kolding. But his love of theatre was still stronger - also under study in Paris.

== Career ==
Roose studied at the Emmanuel Larsen and debuted in 1901 at the Aarhus Theatre as Leander in The Christmas Shop and was employed at Aarhus Theatre until 1904. He also had an "official" debut as Wilfrid Brudenell in Nemesis, but most notable was his performance of Erasmus Montanus figure. Then he was in the periods 1904-1919 and 1922-1951 associated with the Royal Theatre stage director. In the years 1919-1923 he was director of Dagmar Theatre, and organized in 1922, guest performances from Artist Theatre in Moscow. From 1927-1950, he was also a teacher at drama school and the first stage director from 1931 to 1939. He gave a series of lectures on the reading of Danish and classical literature and drama at the University in the years 1925-1931. Thorkild Roose had farewell performance at the Royal Theatre with its brilliance role as the lovable Portuguese cardinal in Kardinalernes Dinner on October 25, 1951, the 50th anniversary of his debut. In 1910, he starred as Count in his first film The Apparently Dead and managed to contribute in nearly 20 silent films and a smaller number of sound film. Silent films include: Through Struggle To Victory, Her Honor, Gold Coin, A Difficult Choice and Exchange Victim. He is remembered for his role as pastor Absalon, whose wife is cheating on him with his own son in the movie Day of Wrath from 1943. Thorkild Roose was chairman of the Danish School Scenes of Representatives from 1922 to 1954 and then honorary member. He was a member of the Radio Council Programme 1937-1954 and president of the 3rd Nordic Theater Congress in 1948. In 1940 he received Theatre trophy and in 1943 he was Studenternes honorary artist - in 1951 he was awarded the medal Ingenio et Arti and in 1958 he became an honorary member of the Danish Solistforbund. He was married June 27, 1902 in Copenhagen with Lillian Amalie Eleonora Kirstine Krøldrup (30 March 1880 - 18 December 1960).
