= Anizy-le-Grand =

- Commune
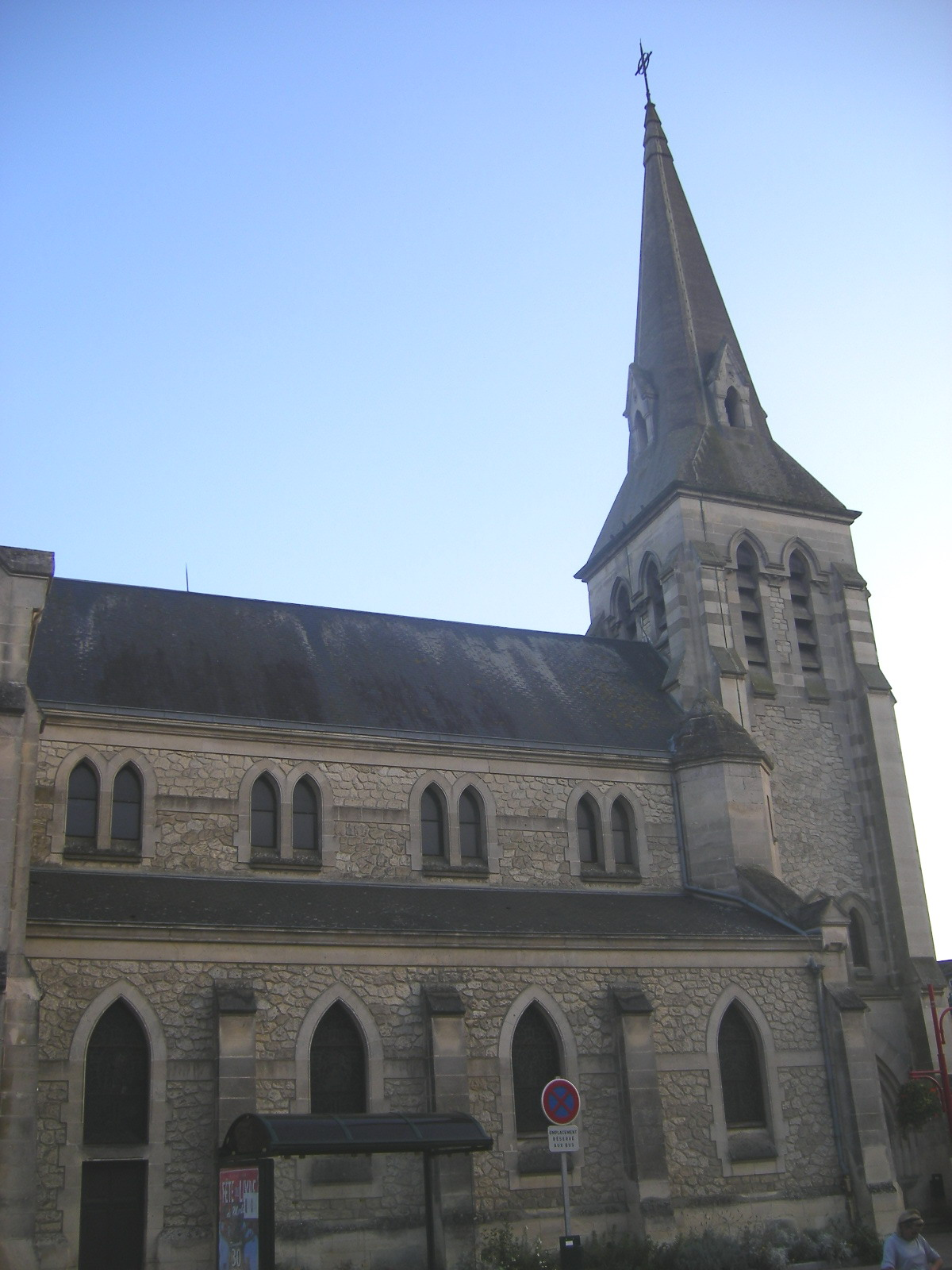
- Church of Anizy-le-Château
- Location of Anizy-le-Grand
- Location within France Location within Hauts-de-France
- Coordinates: 49°30′24″N 3°27′05″E
- Country: France
- Region: Hauts-de-France
- Department: Aisne
- Arrondissement: Laon
- Canton: Laon-1
- Intercommunality: Picardie des Châteaux

Government
  - Mayor (2026–32): Ambroise Centonze-Sandras
- Area^{1}: 20.57 km^{2} (7.94 sq mi)
- Elevation: 70 m (230 ft)
- Highest elevation: 191 m (627 ft)
- Lowest elevation: 52 m (171 ft)
- Population (2023): 2,472
  - Density: 120.2/km^{2} (311.3/sq mi)
- Time zone: UTC+01:00 (CET)
  - Summer (DST): UTC+02:00 (CEST)
- INSEE/Postal code: 02018 /02320
- ^{1} French Land Register data, which excludes lakes, ponds, glaciers > 1 km^{2} (0.386 sq mi or 247 acres) and river estuaries.

Anizy-le-Grand (French pronunciation: [anizi l(ə) ɡʁɑ̃]; lit. 'Anizy-the-Great') is a commune in the Aisne department in the Hauts-de-France region of northern France. It was established on 1 January 2019 from the merger of the communes of Anizy-le-Château, Faucoucourt and Lizy.

== Population ==
Population data refer to the commune in its geography as of January 2025.

Historical population
Year	Pop.	±% p.a.
1968	2,199	—
1975	2,201	+0.01%
1982	2,345	+0.91%
1990	2,335	−0.05%
1999	2,383	+0.23%
2007	2,444	+0.32%
2012	2,505	+0.49%
2017	2,533	+0.22%
2023	2,472	−0.41%
Source: INSEE

== See also ==
- Communes of the Aisne department
