= Aimée-Olympe Desclée =

French actress

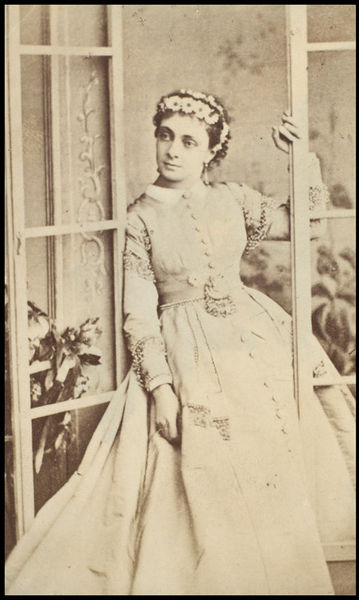
- Born: 16 November 1836; Paris, France
- Died: 8 March 1874 (aged 37); Paris, France
- Citizenship: France
- Occupation: Actress

Aimée-Olympe Desclée (born in Paris, 16 November 1836 – 8 March 1874) was a French actress, recognized for her performances in contemporary French emotional plays. She acted with success in London and also performed in Belgium and Russia. She was reviewed as one of the best actresses of her time and was romantically linked to many famous artists of the day.

== Career ==
Desclée was known for her emotionally-fraught roles, notably in the plays of the younger Alexandre Dumas and contemporaries praised the new realism she brought to the passionately wayward women she portrayed.

== Personal life ==
Henry James, the American novelist, in his essay The Parisian Stage, 1872, described the actress as having "...mastery of the fine shades of expression". A series of her love letters was published at the end of the 19th century.

== Death and burial ==
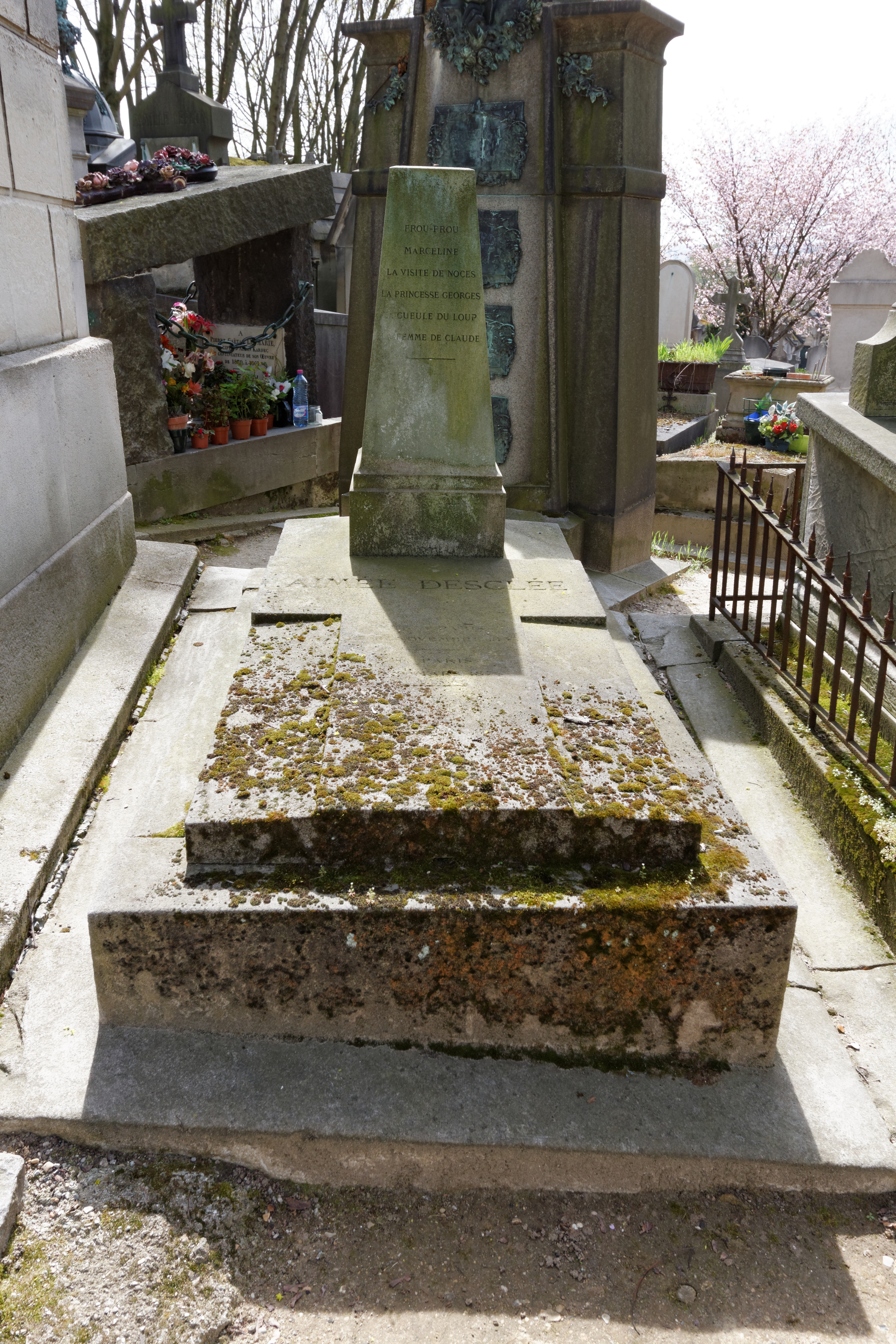
Burial site of Aimée-Olympe Desclée

She died at the early age of 37. Her funeral took place on 11 March 1874 at the church of Saint-Laurent in the presence of "a considerable crowd" according to Le Temps, including representatives from all the Parisian theaters. She was buried in the Père-Lachaise Cemetery in Paris.

A funeral monument to her memory by Alexandre Dumas, Fromental Halévy, Meilhac and Montigny-le-Bretonneux was built on 9 March 1875. Originally, the tomb was surmounted by a bronze bust made by sculptor Albert-Ernest Carrier-Belleuse representing Desclée in the title role of Frou-Frou.

In November 2006, the bust was stolen by thieves who raided the cemetery but was later recovered. An earthenware version of the bust is held by the Los Angeles County Museum of Art, but is not currently on display.

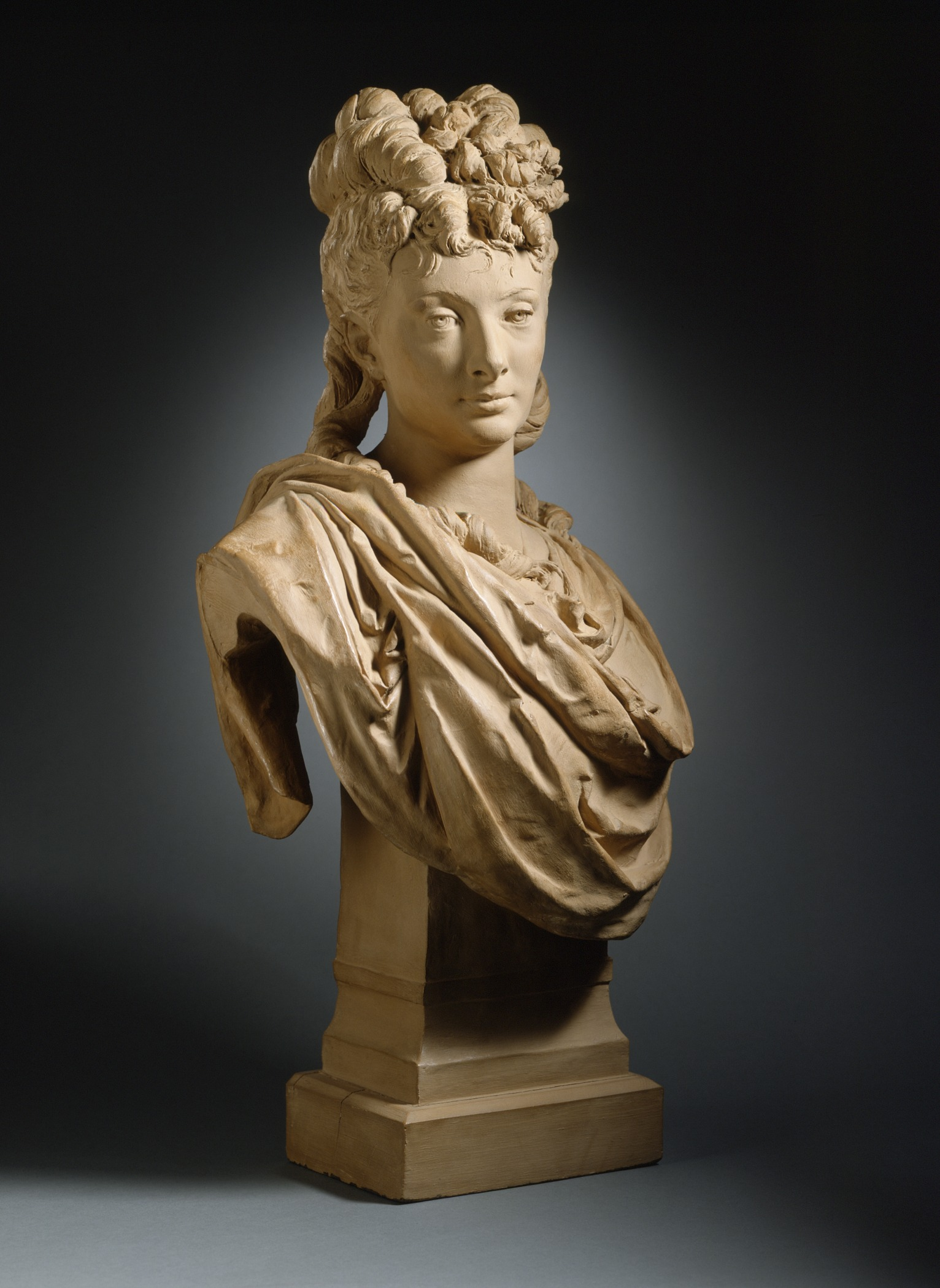
Bust of Aimée-Olympe Desclée by Albert-Ernest Carrier-Belleuse
