= Albert-Ernest Carrier-Belleuse =

French sculptor (1824–1887)

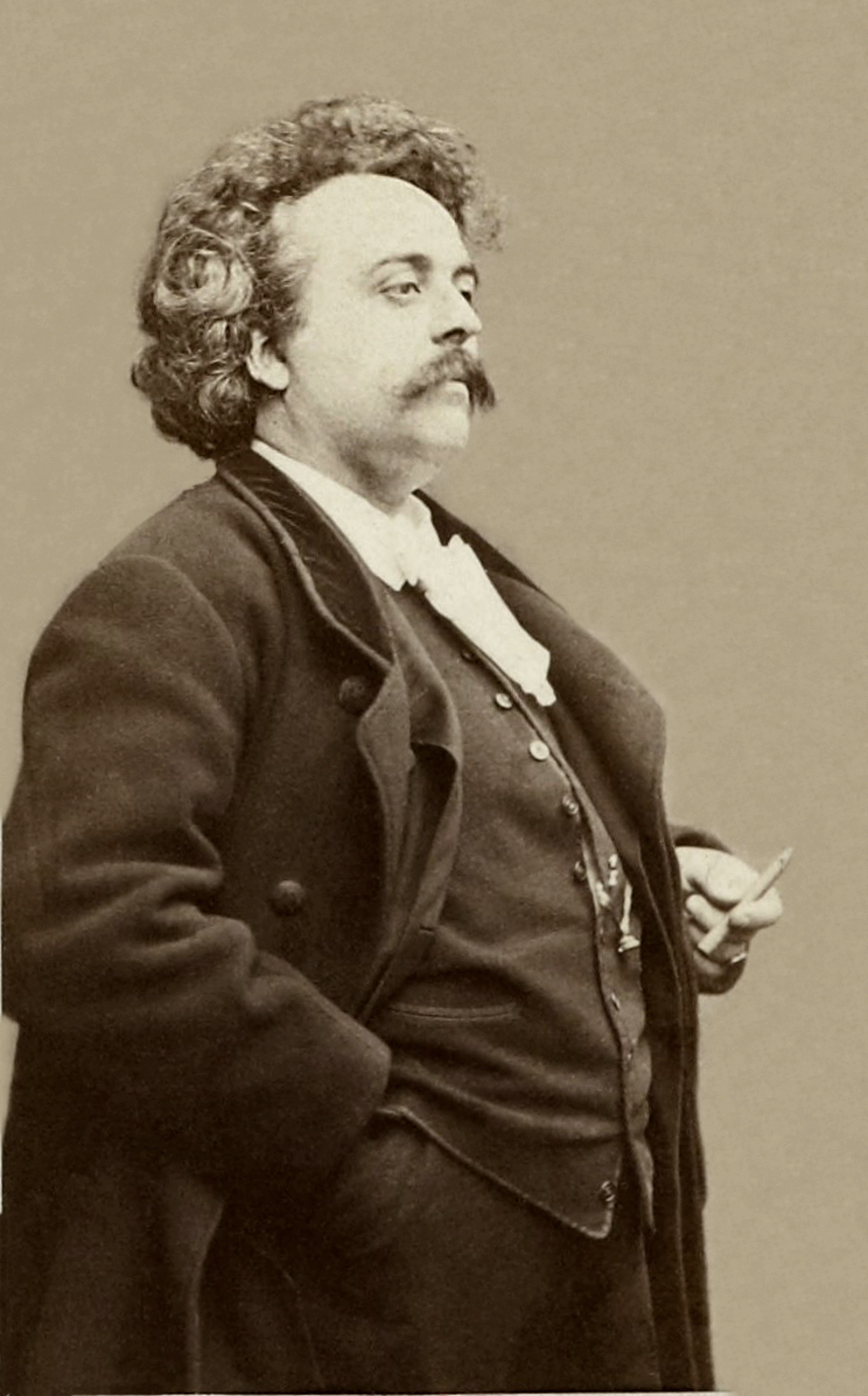
- Carrier-Belleuse, c. 1870
- Born: 12 June 1824; Anizy-le-Château, Aisne, France
- Died: 4 June 1887 (aged 62); Sevres, France
- Known for: Sculpture

Albert-Ernest Carrier-Belleuse (French pronunciation: [albɛʁ ɛʁnɛst kaʁje bɛløz]; born Albert-Ernest Carrier de Belleuse; 12 June 1824 – 4 June 1887) was a French sculptor. He was one of the founding members of the Société Nationale des Beaux-Arts, and was made an officer of the Legion of Honour.

== Early life ==
Carrier-Belleuse was born on 12 June 1824 at Anizy-le-Château, Aisne, France. He began his training as a goldsmith's apprentice. Carrier-Belleuse was a student of David d'Angers and briefly studied at the École des Beaux-Arts. His career is distinguished by his versatility and his work outside France: in England between 1850 and 1855 (working for Mintons), and in Brussels around 1871. His name is perhaps best known because Auguste Rodin worked as his assistant between 1864 and 1870. The two travelled to Brussels in 1871, and by some accounts Rodin assisted Carrier-Belleuse's architectural sculpture for the Brussels Stock Exchange.

== Career ==
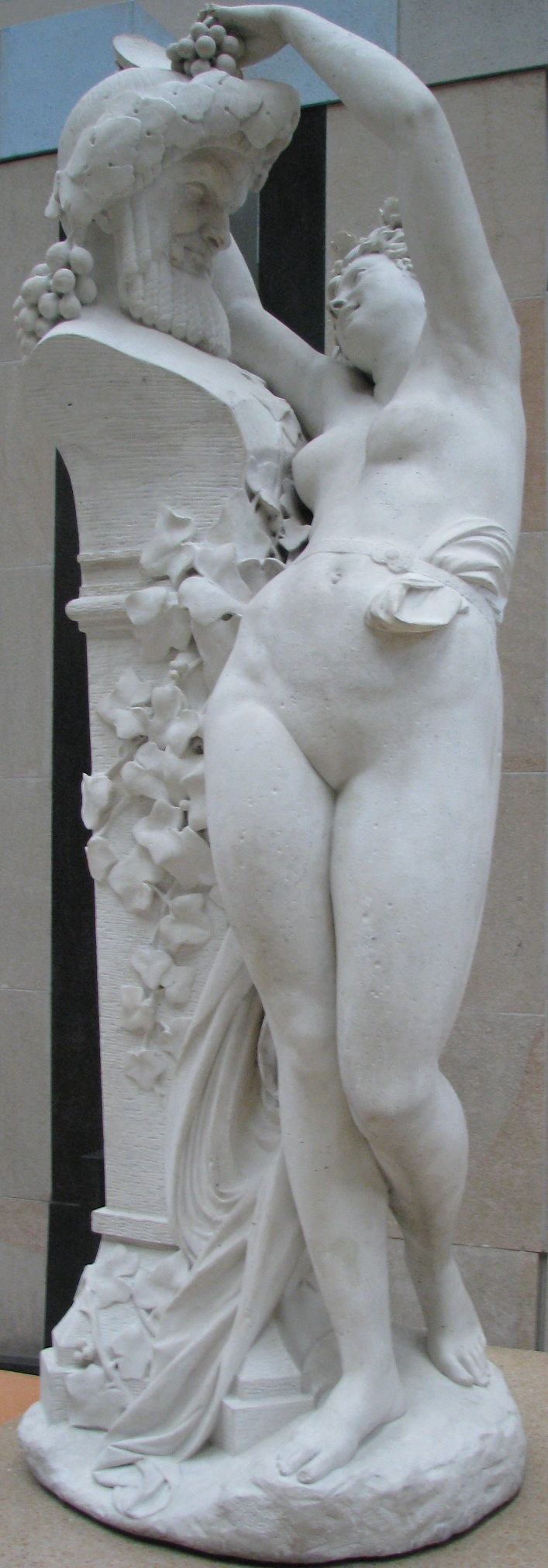
La Bacchante, 1863, Musée d'Orsay

Carrier-Belleuse made many terra cotta pieces, the most famous of which may be The Abduction of Hippodameia depicting the Greek mythological scene of a centaur kidnapping Hippodameia on her wedding day. He was made artistic director at the Manufacture nationale de Sèvres in 1876.

=== Société Nationale des Beaux-Arts ===
In 1862 Carrier-Belleuse was one of the founding members of the Société Nationale des Beaux-Arts, and was made an officer of the Légion d'honneur. The bronzes he executed prior to 1868 were always signed "Carrier" or "A. Carrier", but after 1868 his signature was changed to "Carrier-Belleuse".

=== Artistic style ===
His work encompassed all manner of sculptural subjects and materials, and his naturalism incorporated a breadth of styles: unembellished Realism, neo-Baroque exuberance, and Rococo elegance.

== Family ==
His sons were the painters Louis-Robert Carrier-Belleuse (1848-1913) and Pierre Carrier-Belleuse (1851-1932).

== Death and legacy ==
Carrier-Belleuse died on 4 June 1887 at Sèvres, France.

== Works of art ==
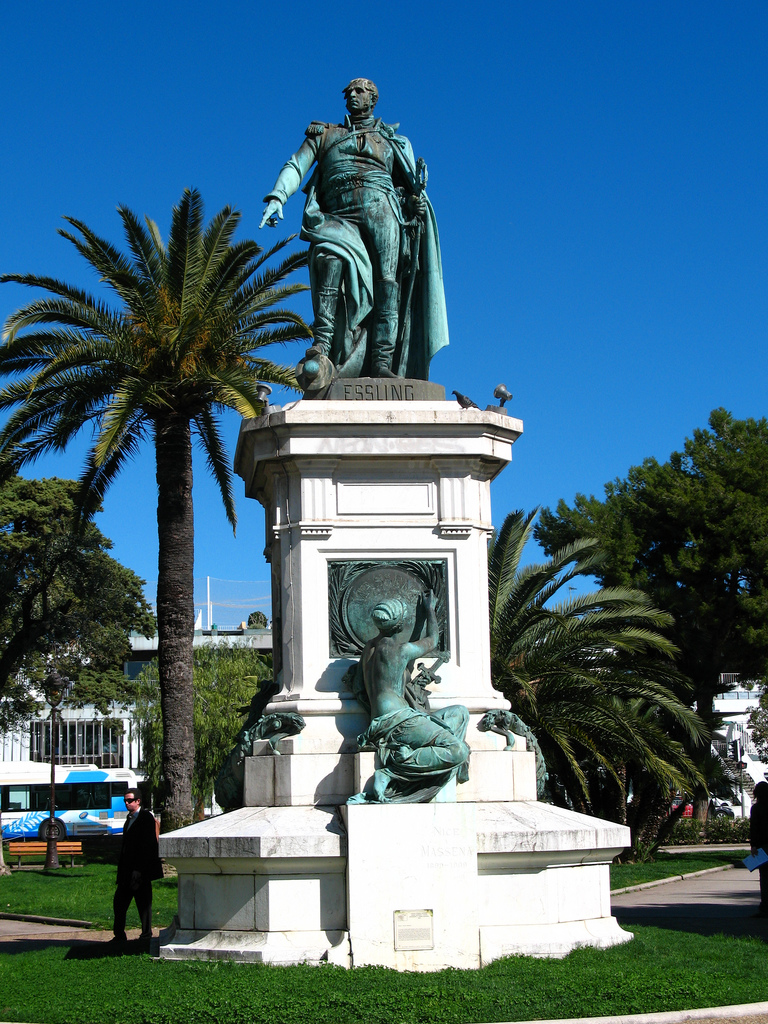
Monument to André Masséna
Nice, 1869

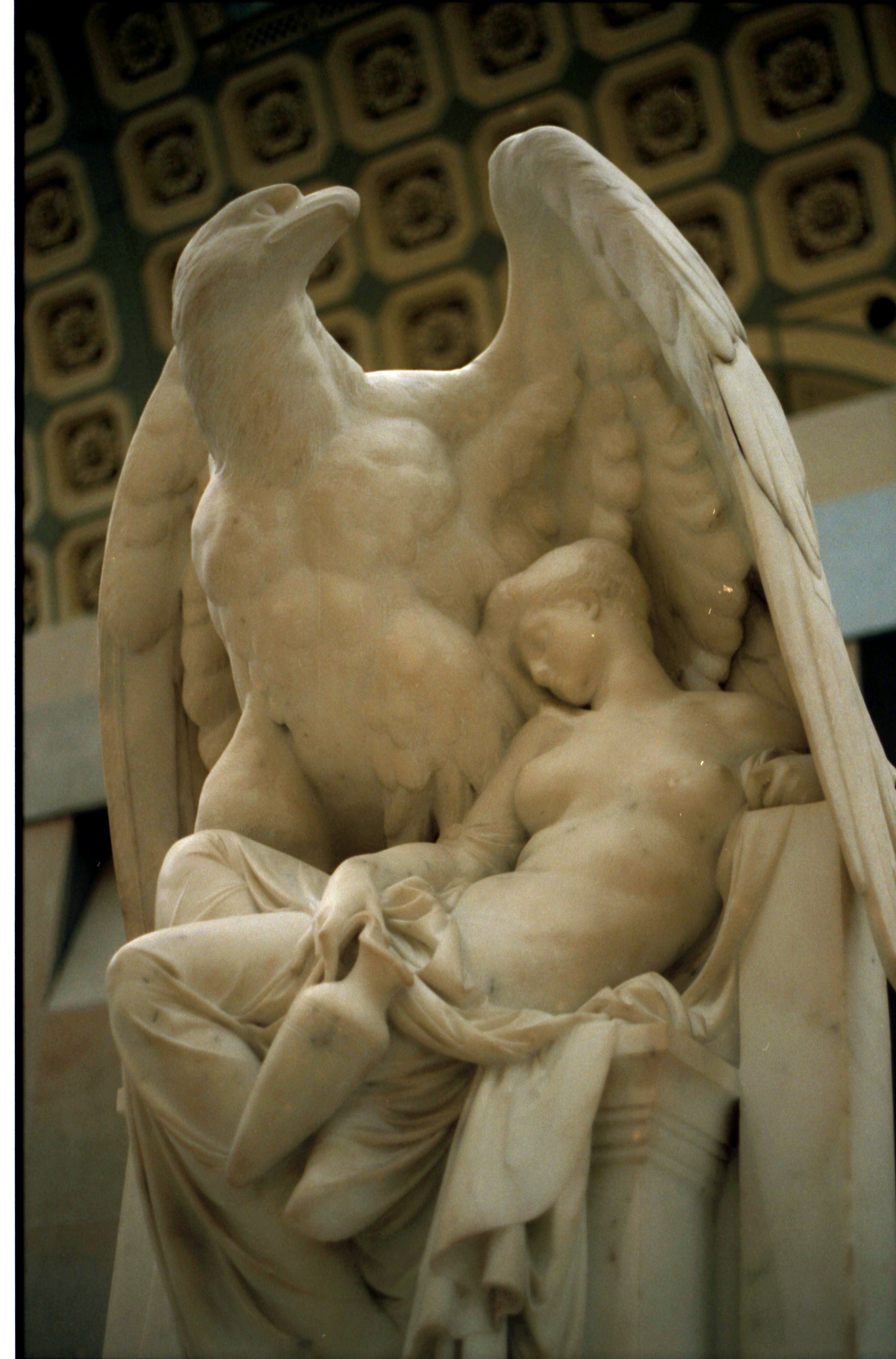
Hebe asleep, 1869
Paris, Musée d'Orsay

- Pediment sculpture of Abundance, Pavillon de Flore, South façade of the Great Galerie, Louvre palace, Paris, circa 1863
- Caryatids themed on the four seasons, Vichy Opera, for architect Charles Badger, 1865
- Architectural sculpture for the Tribunal de commerce de Paris (Commercial Court of Paris), on the Île de la Cité, for architect Antoine-Nicolas Bailly, completed 1865
- A silvered bronze chimney-piece for the Hôtel de la Païva, Paris, 1866
- Monument to André Masséna, Nice, 1869
- Architectural work at the Brussels Stock Exchange, Brussels, circa 1870
- Mary Queen of Scots, Private Collection, ca. 1870
- Two elaborate multifigure torchères for the base of grand staircase, Palais Garnier (Paris Opera), Pairs, 1873
- Tomb of Belgian photographer Louis Ghémar, Laeken Cemetery, Brussels, 1873
- Architectural work for the Théâtre de la Renaissance, Paris, for architect Charles de Lalande, 1873
- Sea Nymph for the fountain at the Place du Theâtre-Français, Paris, for architect Gabriel Davioud, 1874
- Bust of Aimée-Olympe Desclée for her tomb, 1874
- Four Seasons fountain, Hotel de Ville, Fleurance
- Mausoleum of José de San Martín, Buenos Aires Metropolitan Cathedral, Buenos Aires
- Equestrian statue of Mihai Viteazul, University Square, Bucharest, Romania
- Equestrian statue of Manuel Belgrano, Plaza de Mayo Square, Buenos Aires, Argentina
- Equestrian statue of Bernardo O'Higgins, Alameda, Santiago de Chile, Chile
- Statue for the victims of the La Compañía fire, originally at the place of the fire, today in front of the General Cemetery in Santiago de Chile, Chile

== Gallery ==
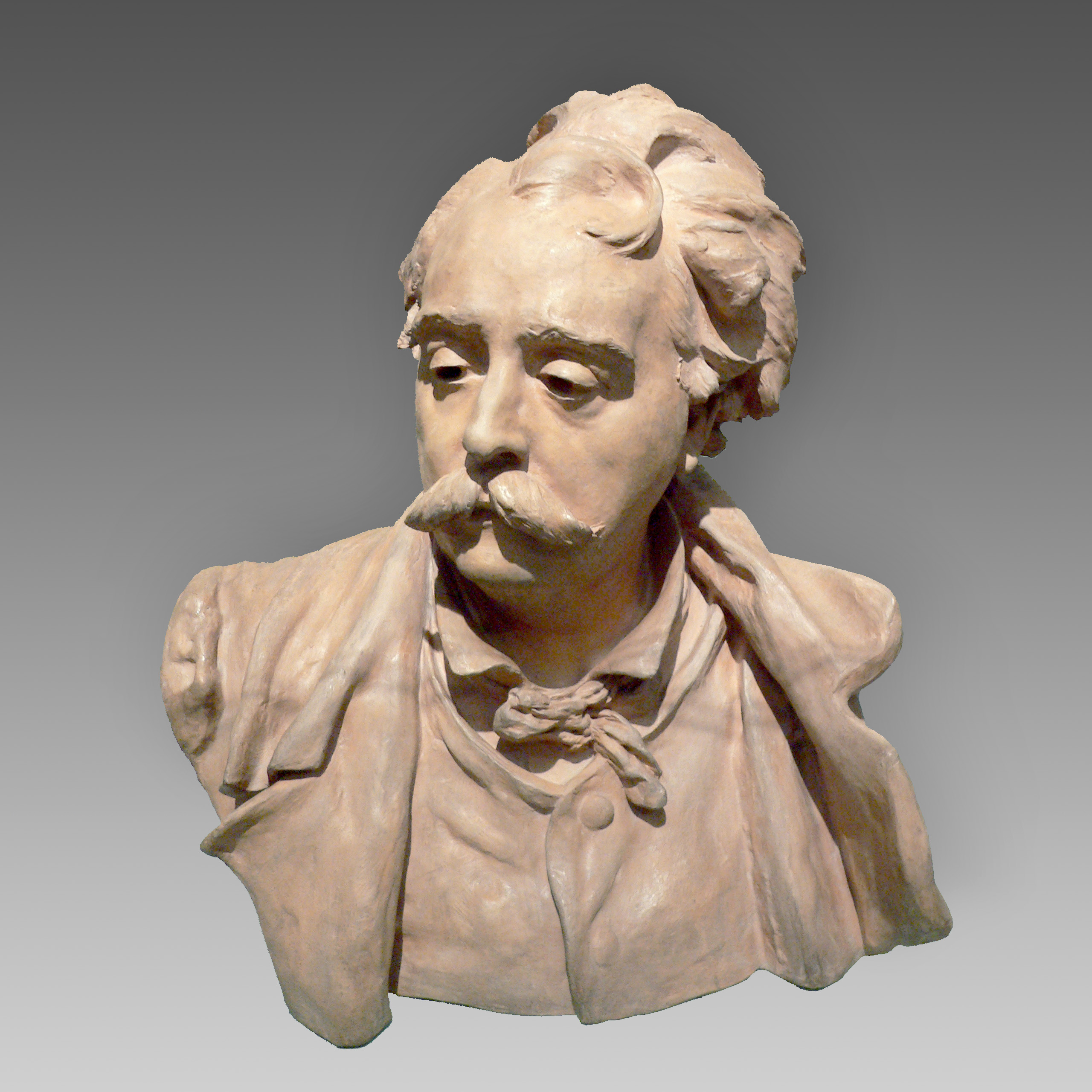
Bust of Carrier-Belleuse by Auguste Rodin

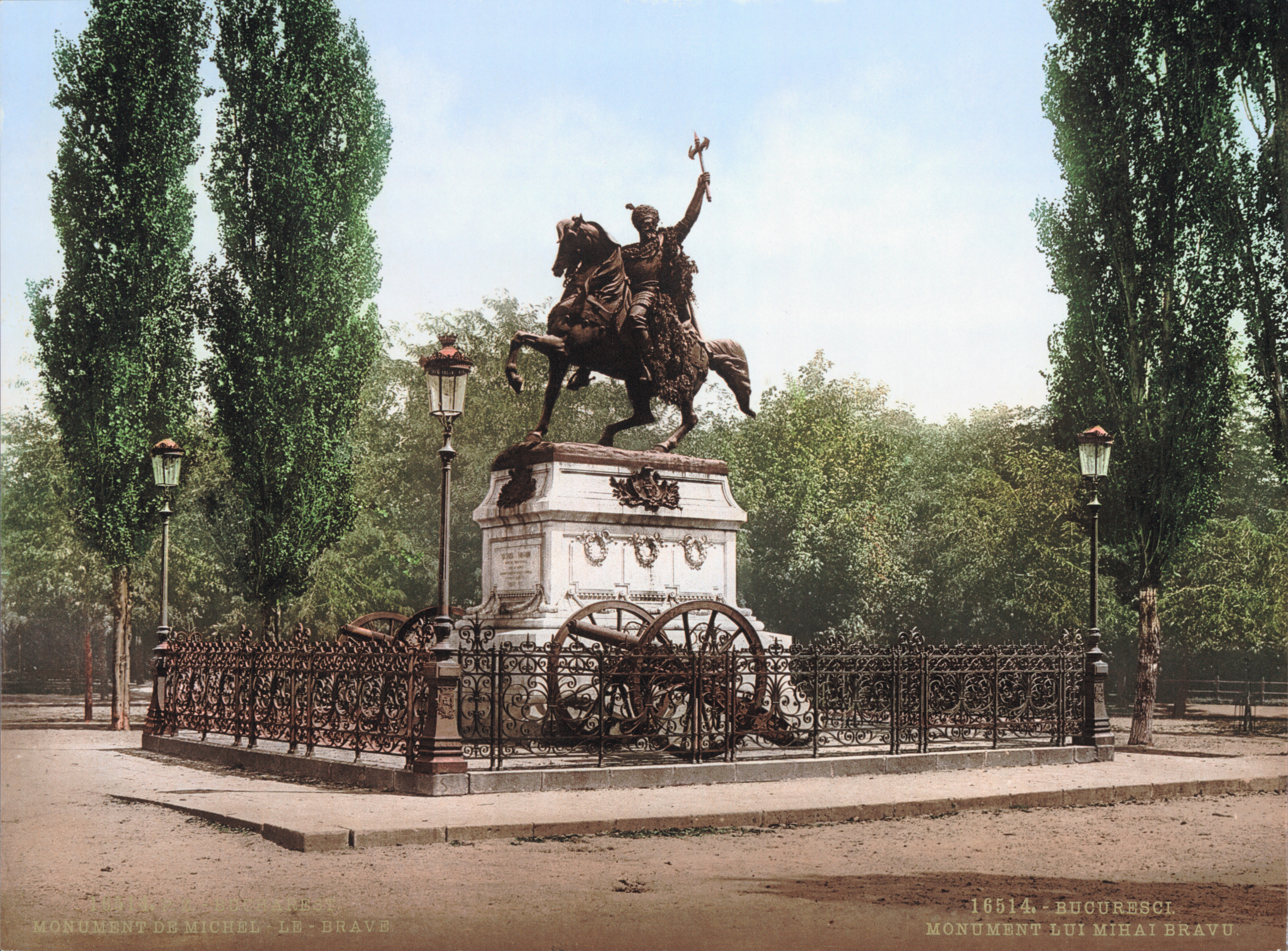
Equestrian statue of Mihai Viteazul in Bucharest

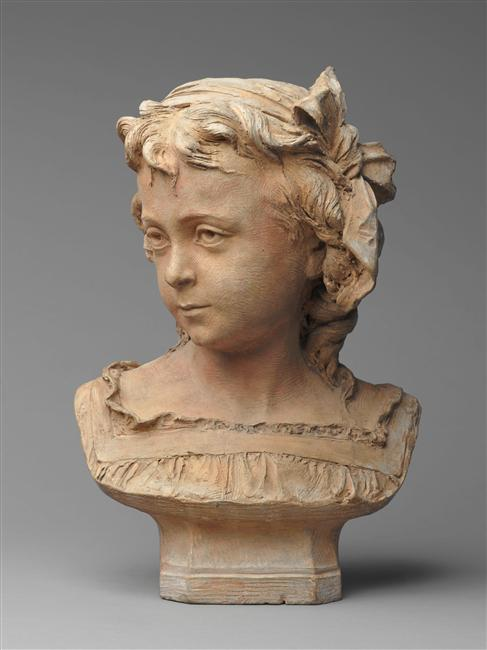
Marie Carrier-Belleuse, 1859, Musée d'Orsay

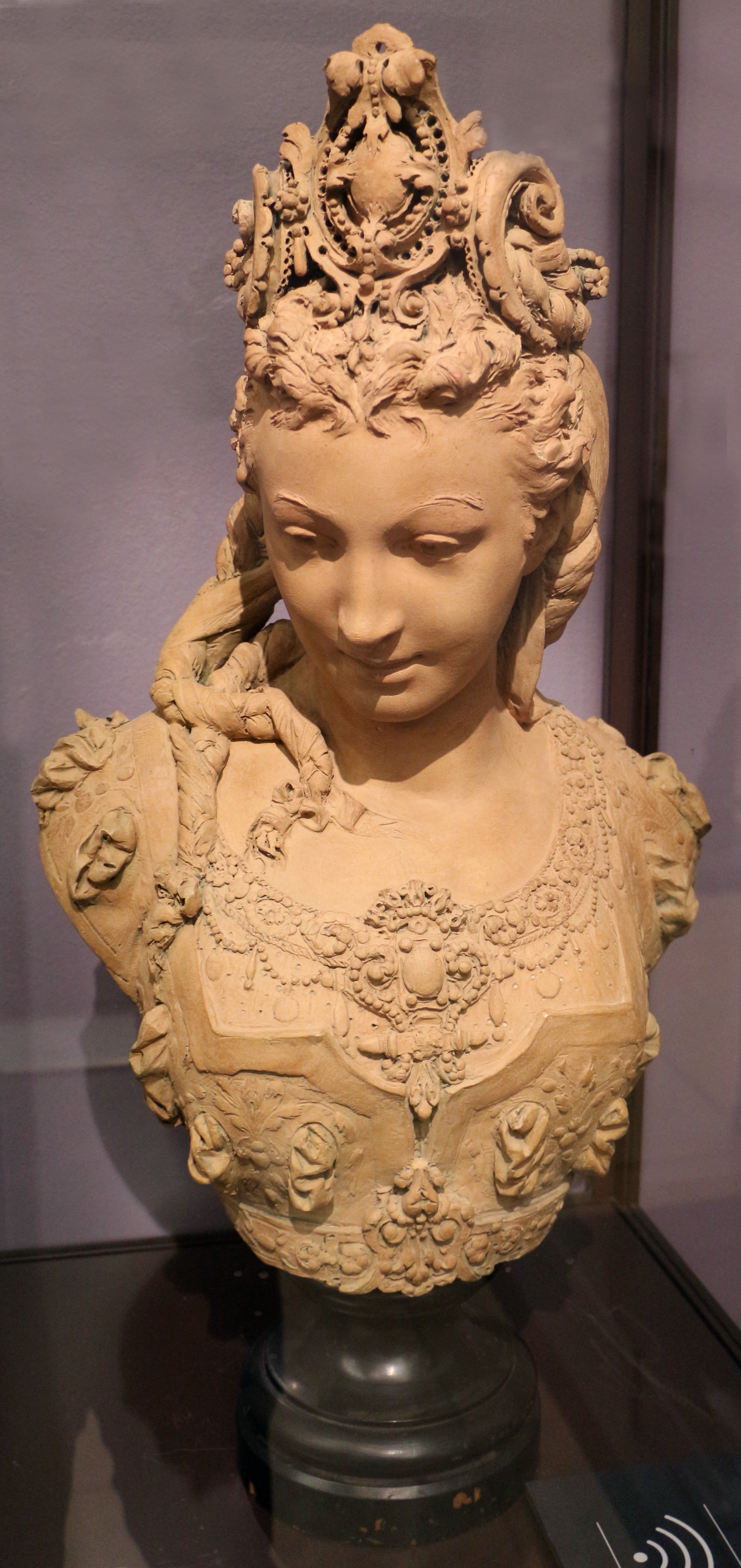
Bust of a Woman with a Diadem, c. 1860–1870, Musée d'Orsay

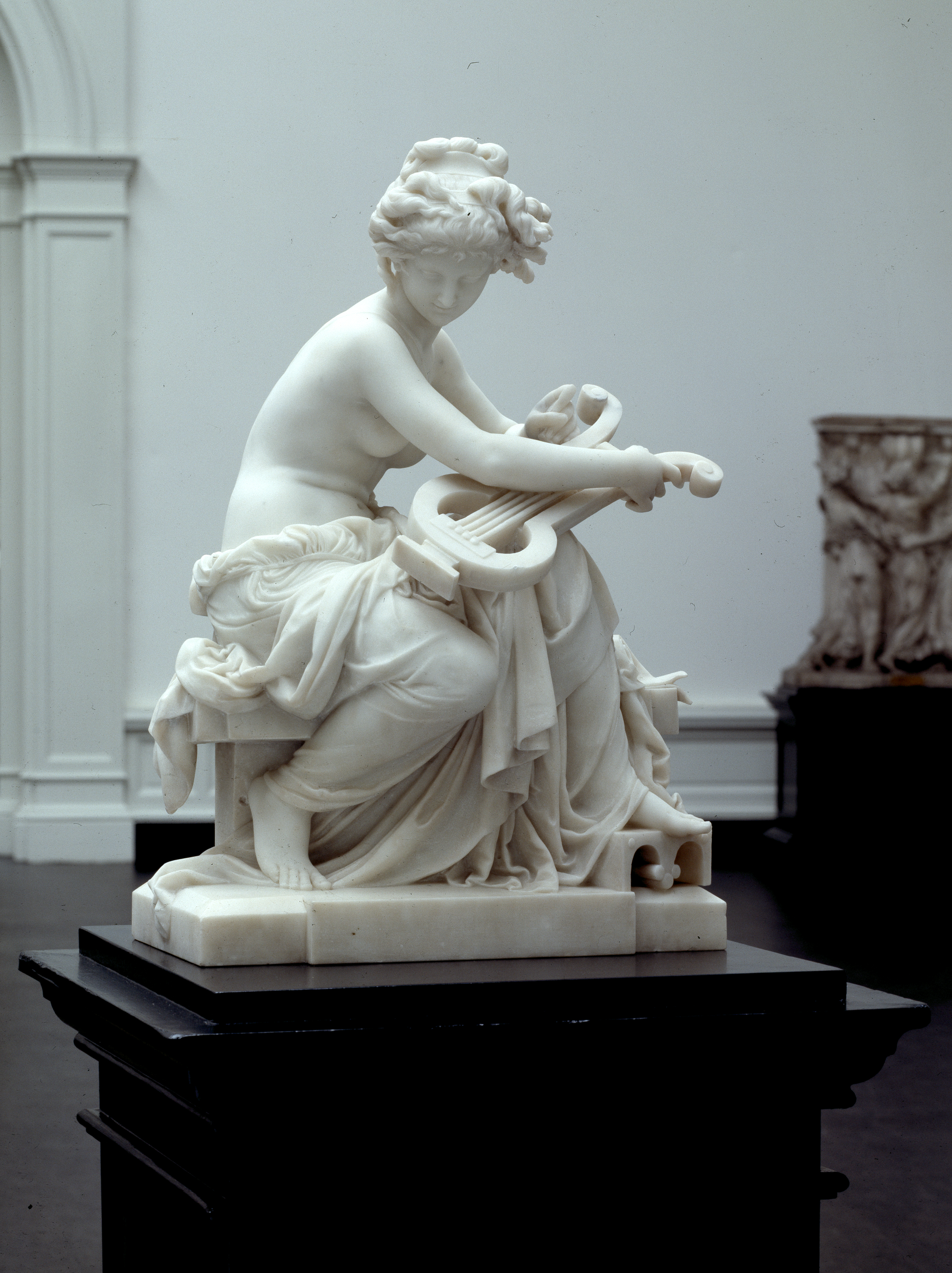
Harmony, Museum of Fine Arts, Ghent

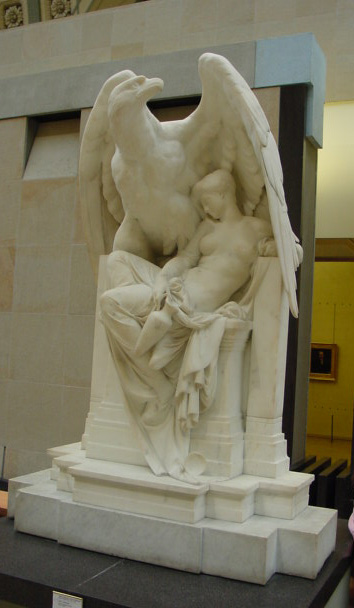
Hebe asleep, c. 1869, Musée d'Orsay

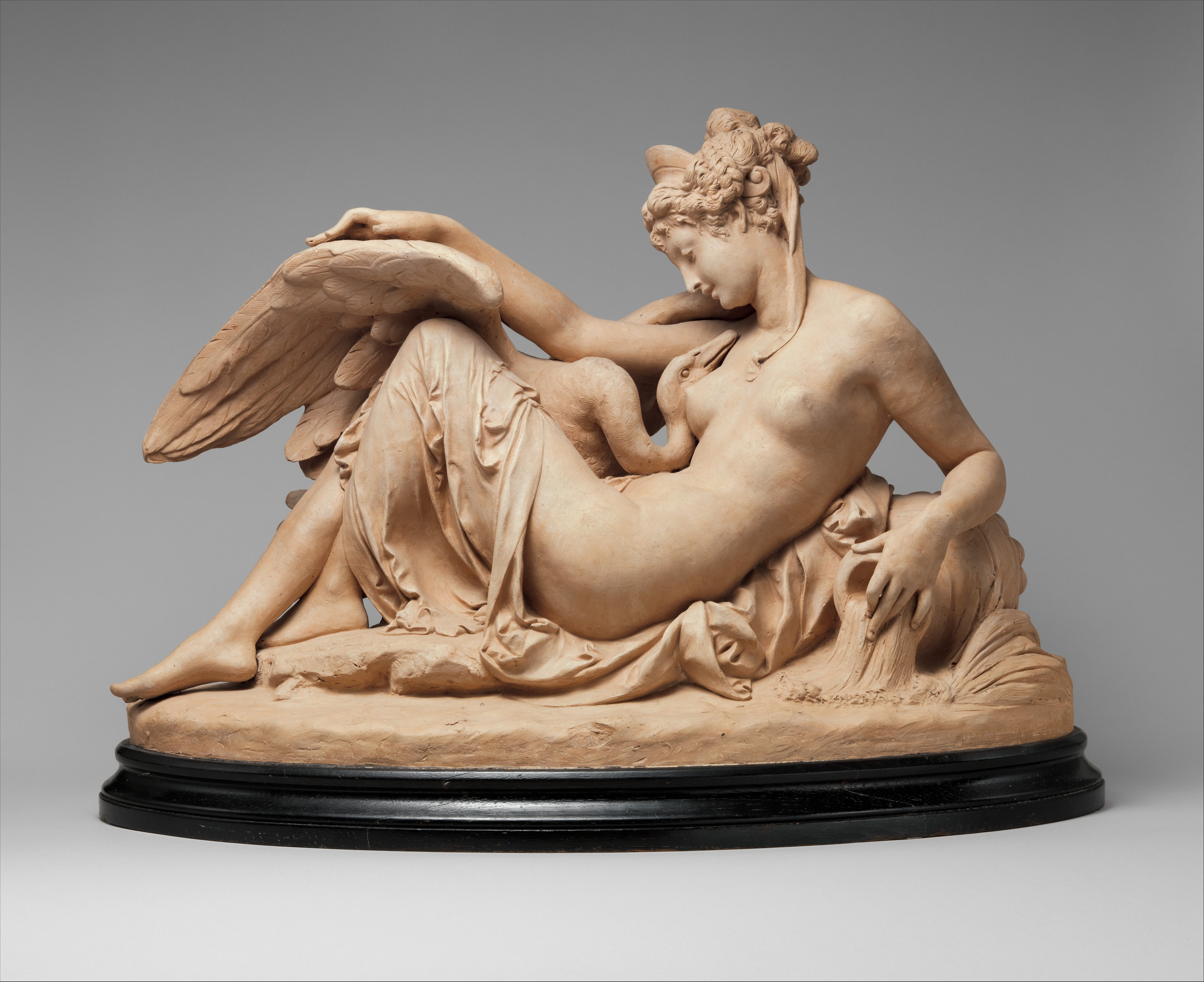
Leda and the Swan, c. 1870, Metropolitan Museum of Art

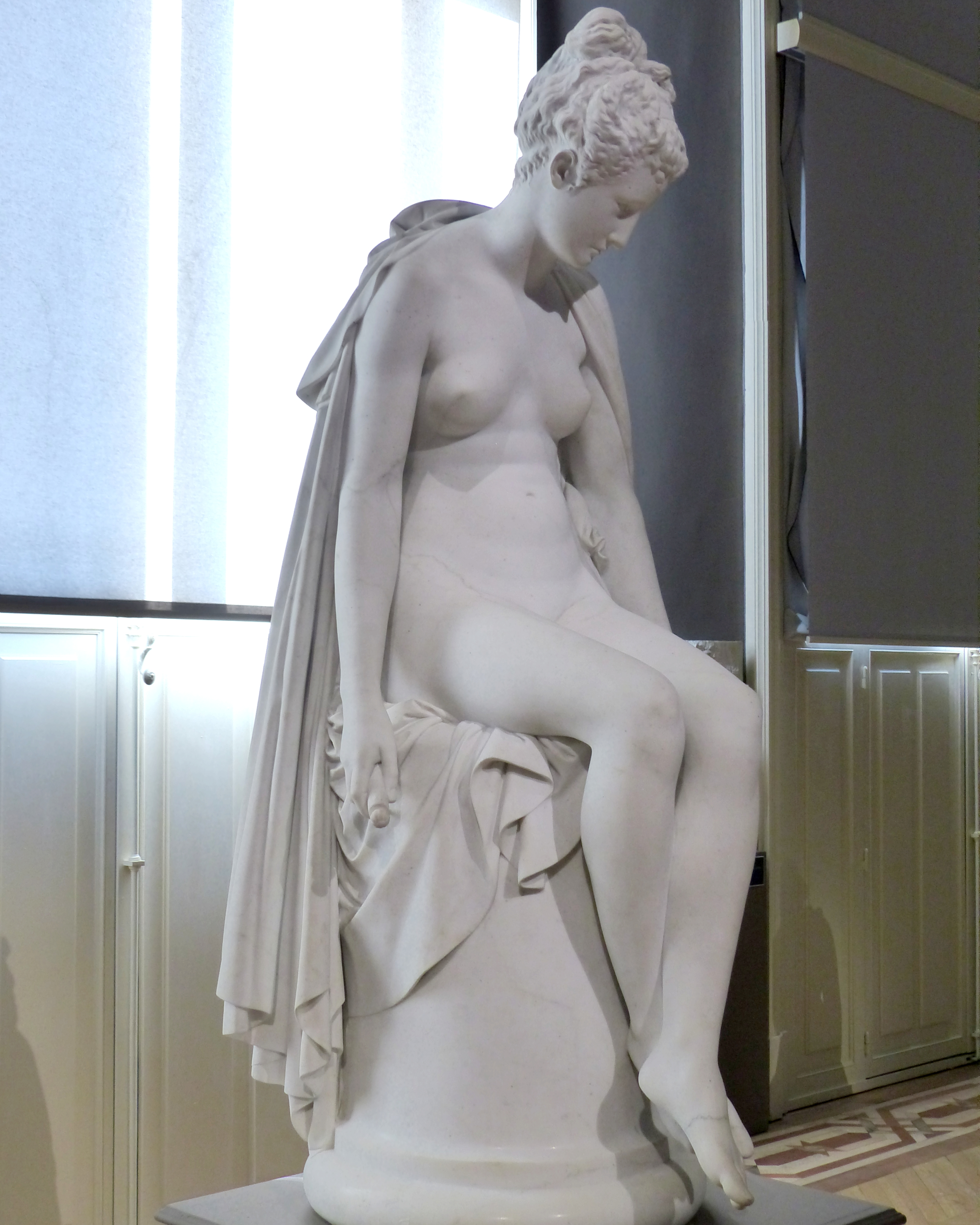
Psyche, 1872

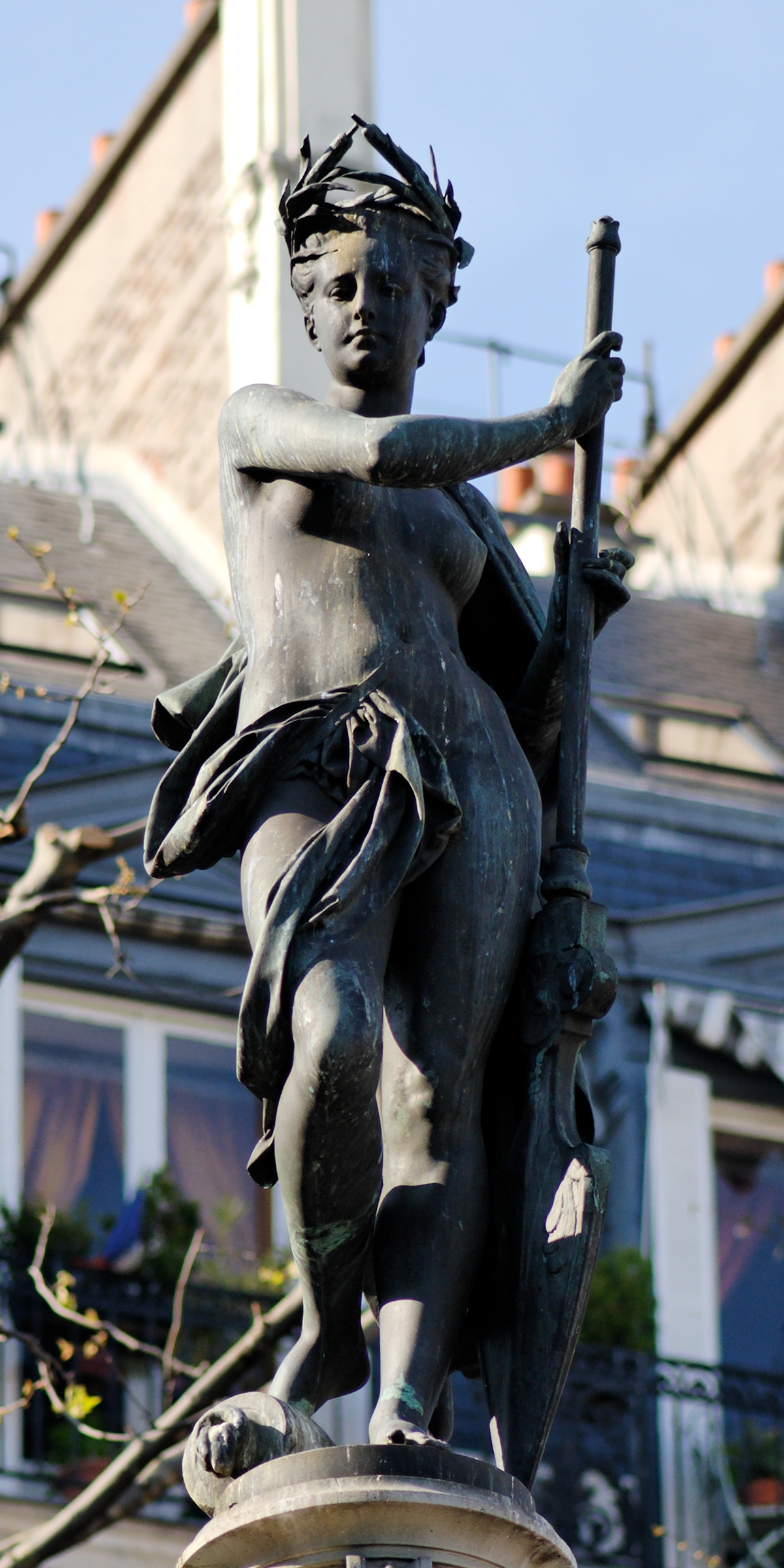
Sea Nymph from a fountain on the Place du Théâtre-Français, Paris, 1874
