= Faucoucourt =

- Part of Anizy-le-Grand
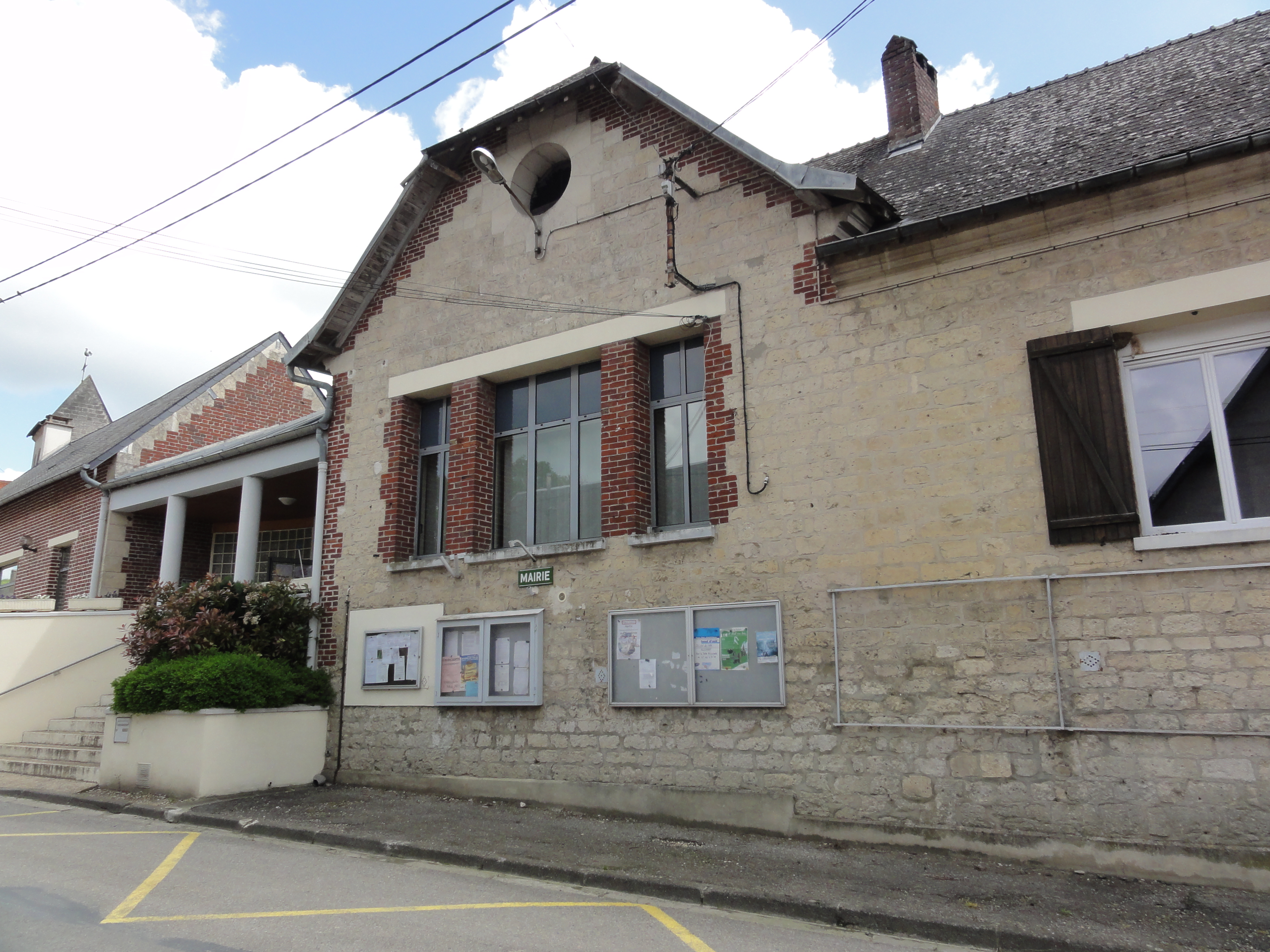
- The town hall of Faucoucourt
- Location of Faucoucourt
- Location within France Location within Hauts-de-France
- Coordinates: 49°31′57″N 3°27′57″E
- Country: France
- Region: Hauts-de-France
- Department: Aisne
- Arrondissement: Laon
- Canton: Laon-1
- Commune: Anizy-le-Grand
- Area^{1}: 7.35 km^{2} (2.84 sq mi)
- Elevation: 95 m (312 ft)
- Highest elevation: 191 m (627 ft)
- Lowest elevation: 61 m (200 ft)
- Population (2021): 298
  - Density: 40.5/km^{2} (105/sq mi)
- Time zone: UTC+01:00 (CET)
  - Summer (DST): UTC+02:00 (CEST)
- Postal code: 02320
- ^{1} French Land Register data, which excludes lakes, ponds, glaciers > 1 km^{2} (0.386 sq mi or 247 acres) and river estuaries.

Faucoucourt (French pronunciation: [fokukuʁ]) is a former commune in the Aisne department in Hauts-de-France in northern France. On 1 January 2019, it was merged into the new commune of Anizy-le-Grand.

== Population ==
Historical population
Year	Pop.	±% p.a.
2006	302	—
2011	307	+0.33%
2015	311	+0.32%
2021	298	−0.71%
Source: INSEE

== See also ==
- Communes of the Aisne department
