= Anne Pedersdotter (play) =

Play by Hans Wiers-Jenssen

- Written by: Hans Wiers-Jenssen
- Characters: Anne Pedersdotter; Absalon Pederssøn; Martin; Merete Beyer; Johannes; Laurentius; The bishop Herlofs-Marte
- Original language: Norwegian
- Subject: Witch-hunt
- Genre: Drama
- Setting: Bergen

Premiere
- Date premiered: 12 February 1908
- Place premiered: Kristiania

Anne Pedersdotter (English version, The Witch, trans. John Masefield) is a play written in 1908 by Norwegian playwright Hans Wiers-Jenssen. The play is based on an incident from 1590, when Anne Pedersdotter, the widow of priest Absalon Pederssøn Beyer, was accused of witchcraft and burned alive in the city of Bergen.

== Plot ==
The play gives a picture of the cultural history of the time, but the plot is not based on historical facts. The title character falls victim of an irresistible desire for her stepson Martin, who is a young theologian. The sinful passion between the young couple shows signs of being bewitched. In the end Anne is convicted as a witch.

== Productions ==
The play premiered at Nationaltheatret in Kristiania on 12 February 1908, staged by Halfdan Christensen. Johanne Dybwad played the role character "Anne", Stub Wiberg played her husband "Absalon Pederssøn", August Oddvar played their son "Martin", and Sofie Reimers played "Merete Beyer". A 1909 production at Den Nationale Scene in Bergen, staged by Wiers-Jenssen, was well received. The play has later been staged at many Norwegian theatres, as well as in other European countries, and on stages in Asia and America.

== Opera adaptations ==
The play was adapted for the opera La fiamma in 1934, with music by Ottorino Respighi. The opera Anne Pedersdotter with music by Edvard Fliflet Bræin and libretto by Hans Kristiansen (based on Wiers-Jenssen's play) premiered in Oslo in 1971.

== Film adaptations ==
The play Anne Pedersdotter was basis for the Danish film Day of Wrath (Danish: Vredens Dag) from 1943, directed by Carl Theodor Dreyer.

== List of characters ==
- Anne Pedersdotter
- Absalon Pederssøn
- Martin
- Merete Beyer
- Master Johannes
- Master Laurentius
- The bishop
- Herlofs-Marte (witch)
