= Hans Wiers-Jenssen =

Norwegian novelist, playwright, stage producer and theatre historian

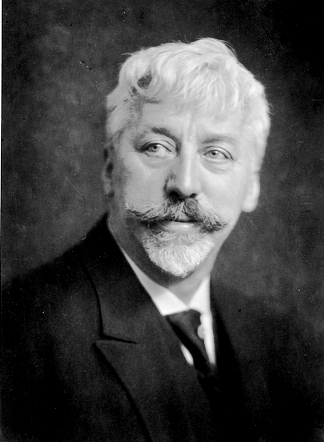
- Wiers-Jenssen, portrait dated 1926 (posthumously)
- Born: 25 November 1866; Bergen, Norway
- Died: 25 August 1925 (aged 58); Bergen
- Occupations: novelist, playwright, stage producer and theatre historian
- Children: Johan Henrik Wiers-Jenssen

Hans Wiers-Jenssen (25 November 1866 – 25 August 1925) was a Norwegian novelist, playwright, stage producer and theatre historian. Wiers-Jenssen was employed at the theatres Christiania Theatre, Nationaltheatret and Den Nationale Scene.

== Personal life ==
Wiers-Jenssen was born in Bergen as the son of colorist Johan Jenssen and his wife Elisa Magdalena Wiers. In 1894 he married Rigmor Nicolowna Danielsen, herself an author of humorous fiction. Together they had the son Johan Henrik Wiers-Jenssen, who was also to become a theater man and author of humorous prose.

== Career ==
After his examen artium at the Bergen Cathedral School in 1885, Wiers-Jenssen studied language and cultural history, graduating as Cand.mag. in 1892. He worked as a journalist for the newspaper Dagbladet, and wrote the revue Tutti Frutti, staged at Eldorado in 1893 where it became quite popular, with 101 performances. He was a stage instructor at the Christiania Theatre from 1895, and also actor. From 1899 he worked as a secretary at Nationaltheatret, and from 1900 to 1905 he worked for Den Nationale Scene in Bergen, both as actor, stage producer and literary consultant. He worked for Nationaltheatret from 1905 to 1909.

He wrote the novel Presten paa Korshavn og hans hustru in 1907.

=== Playwright ===
As a playwright, Wiers-Jenssen is best known for his play Anne Pedersdotter from 1908, first staged by Halfdan Christensen on Nationaltheatret in 1908, with Johanne Dybwad playing the role character "Anne". It is based on Anne Pedersdotter, who was burned as a witch in Bergen in 1590. The play was later performed on several Norwegian stages.

John Masefield's, English translation became The Witch. Translations were made in other European and Asian countries. Anne Pedersdotter was also the basis for the Danish film Day of Wrath from 1943, and two adaptations for opera: La fiamma (libretto by Claudio Guastalla, music by Ottorino Respighi, 1934), and Anne Pedersdotter; libretto by Hans Kristiansen, music by Edvard Fliflet Bræin from 1971. His comedy Jan Herwitz premiered at Nationaltheatret in 1913, and has later been very popular at the Bergen theatre Den Nationale Scene, with hundreds of performances over the years, visited by nearly 90,000 spectators.

Wiers-Jenssen wrote books on the theatre history of Oslo and Bergen, covering the first 25 years of Nationaltheatret, and also the first 25 years of Den Nationale Scene.

== Selected works ==
- Tutti-Frutti (revue, staged in 1893)
- Anne Pedersdotter (play, staged in 1908)
- Jan Herwitz. Gamle Bergensbilleder (comedy, first staged in 1913)
- Billeder fra Bergens ældste teaterhistorie (in Norwegian). Bergen. 1921.
- Nationaltheatret gjennem 25 aar (in Norwegian). 1924.
- Den Nationale Scene. De første 25 aar (in Norwegian). Bergen. 1926.
