= Bernhard Heinrich Irrgang =

German organist (1869–1916)

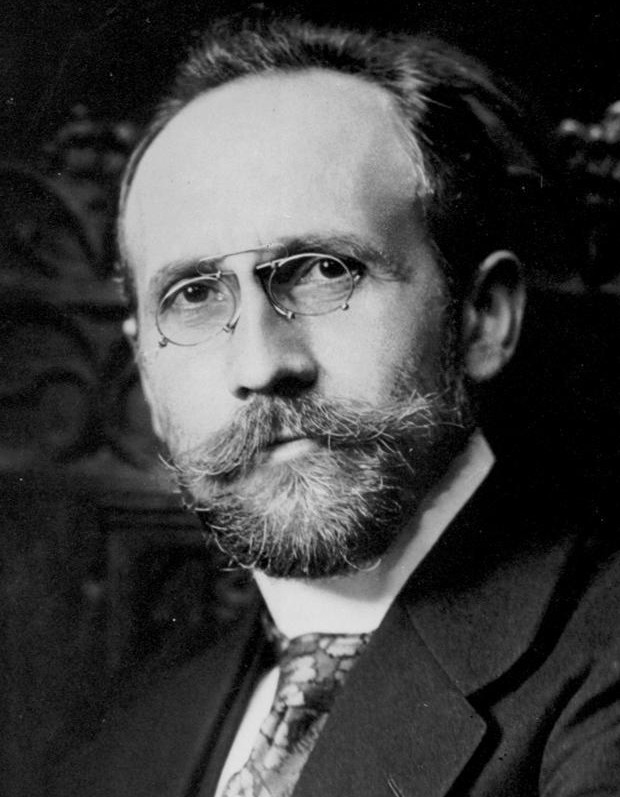
Bernhard Heinrich Irrgang

Bernhard Heinrich Irrgang (23 July 1869 – 8 April 1916) was a German organist, composer and docent for organ practice.

== Life ==
Irrgang was born in Zduny, former Province of Posen. His father was a Protestant cantor and teacher in Zduny. Bernhard was educated at the Royal Music Institute of Berlin from 1890 to 1896 and in the academic master class in composition. Active as an organist in various parishes from the beginning of his studies, Irrgang was a member of the Berlin Philharmonic from 1897.Memorial Bernhard Irrgang. In Berlin.Friedparks.de. The pupil Otto Dienel worked from 1894 to 1905 as organist at the newly built Heilig-Kreuz-Kirche in Kreuzberg, then until 1910 as music director at the St. Mary's Church, Berlin. From 1910, he was organist at the Berlin Cathedral.

The organ virtuoso was known in Berlin for his "groundbreaking" concerts. Among his performances were over 550 free weekly concerts, at which he performed, among others, compositions by Josef Rheinberger's In 1909 Irrgang made a concert tour to Sweden.

From 1905, he taught organ playing at the Stern conservatory and from 1912 at the Royal Music Institute of Berlin. Among his pupils was John J. McClellan. Irrgang composed organ sonatas and sacred songs, motets and aria in his sonatas following the tradition of Felix Mendelssohn Bartholdy and Josef Rheinberger. For Irrgang's appreciation of Rheinberger, see his letter dated 5 October 1901: Bernhard Irrgang introduces himself to Rheinberger by letter as an admirer and thanks him for Sonata No. 20. In J. G. Rheinberger-Archiv, Vaduz.

Robert Breuer counted Irrgang's organ playing "among the most manly memories of our youth." For Richard Gölz, who met him in 1914, he was one of the "great organ masters" of the time.

Irrgang died in Berlin at the age of 46. The gravesite is located at the Liesenstraße. The State Institute for Music Research Berlin has a Bernhard Irrgang Collection which contains organ appraisals, concert reviews and programmes, and sheet music; the Staatsbibliothek zu Berlin keeps 87 of Irrgang's autographs in its music department, mainly letters.

== Work ==
- Choralbuch zu dem Deutsches Evangelisches Gesangbuch. Im Auftrag des Deutschen Evangelischen Kirchenausschusses. Mittler, Berlin 1916.
