= 2011 in Nordic music =

The following is a list of notable events and releases that happened in Nordic music in 2011.

== Events ==
- 26 January – Norway's inaugural Bodø Jazz Open opens in Bodø, running until 29 January.
- 28 January – Marit Sandvik receives the Nordlysprisen award, given to a contributor to the music of Northern Norway.
- 28 February – Swedish duo Roxette launches its 55-date "Charm School World Tour", part of "The Neverending World Tour" in Kazan, Russia, in front of 8,000 people.
- 6 April – It is reported that keyboardist Per Wiberg has left the band Opeth.
- 16 April – During Norway's Vossajazz festival:
  - Mari Kvien Brunvoll receives the Vossajazzprisen for 2011.
  - Mathias Eick performs the commissioned work Voss.
- 9 June – Rockland the Opera, an opera by Finland's Jukka Linkola, is premièred at the Nivala Ice Arena.
- 17 June
  - The 28th Stockholm Jazz Festival opens in Stockholm, Sweden, lasting until 19 June
  - Finnish singer Tarja Turunen performs with tenor José Cura at the Savonlinna Opera Festival.
- 22 July – The far-right terrorist attacks on civilians and government offices in Norway lead to the renewed popularity of Ole Paus's 1994 song, "Mitt lille land".
- 15 October – Olli Kortekangas's one-act opera Yhden yön juttu (One Night Stand), commissioned by the Sibelius Academy, is premièred at the Helsinki Music Centre
- 1 November – Norwegian TV station NRK broadcasts a 30-minute film in which musician Jørn Stubberud (aka Necrobutcher) undergoes an exorcism by US televangelist Bob Larson.
- December – Blood Red Throne take on Yngve "Bolt" Christiansen as their new vocalist, replacing Osvald "Vald" Egeland.

== New works ==
- Kalevi Aho – Trumpet Concerto
- Per Nørgård – Symphony No. 8
- Đuro Živković – On the Guarding of the Heart

== Albums released ==
=== January ===
Day	Artist	Album	Label	Notes	Ref.
7	Axenstar	Aftermath	IceWarrior Records		
11	myGRAIN	myGRAIN	Spinefarm Records		
11	Stratovarius	Elysium	Victor Entertainment		
17	Desultory	Counting Our Scars			
21	Sirenia	The Enigma of Life	Nuclear Blast Records		
26	Battlelore	Doombound	Napalm Records	Concept album focusing on Túrin Turambar	

=== February ===
Day	Artist	Album	Label	Notes	Ref.
2	Ajattara	Murhat	Osasto-A Records		
4	Korpiklaani	Ukon Wacka	Nuclear Blast	All tracks sung in Finnish	
7	Sigbjørn Apeland	Glossolalia	Hubro Music		
7	Vreid	V	Indie Recordings		
9	KYPCK	Lower	Indie Recordings		
11	Roxette	Charm School	Roxette Recordings; Capitol	First studio album since 2001	
14	Lifelover	Sjukdom	Prophecy Productions		
14	The Project Hate	Bleeding The New Apocalypse (Cum Victriciis In Manibus Armis)		Mixed by Dan Swanö	
14	September	Love CPR	Catchy Tunes	Digital release	
15	Svartsyn	Wrath Upon the Earth	Agonia Records		
18	Jenny Hval	Viscera	Rune Grammofon		
21	Moonsorrow	Varjoina Kuljemme Kuolleiden Maassa	Spinefarm Records		
22	Evergrey	Glorious Collision	Steamhammer/SPV		
23	Carl Norén	Owls	EMI Music Sweden	First solo album	
23	Thomas Di Leva	Hjärtat vinner alltid	Universal Import		
25	Before the Dawn	Deathstar Rising	Nuclear Blast		
25	Mercenary	Metamorphosis	NoiseArt Records		
25	One Man Army and the Undead Quartet	The Dark Epic			
25	Thunderbolt	Dung Idols			
28	Mohombi	MoveMeant	2101 Records		
28	Frederik Magle	Like a Flame	Proprius Music	Recorded on the Frobenius pipe organ in Jørlunde church	

=== March ===
Day	Artist	Album	Label	Notes	Ref.
1	Omnium Gatherum	New World Shadows	Lifeforce Records	First album on new label	
2	Lykke Li	Wounded Rhymes	Atlantic Records		
7	Burzum	Fallen	Byelobog Productions	Vocals and all instruments by Varg Vikernes	
8	Children of Bodom	Relentless Reckless Forever	Spinefarm Records, Fearless Records and Nuclear Blast		
9	Swingfly	Awesomeness – An Introduction to Swingfly			
11	Ole Mathisen, Per Mathisen and Paolo Vinaccia	Elastics	Losen Records		
11	Danny Saucedo	In the Club	Sony		
15	Rotten Sound	Cursed	Relapse Records and Fullsteam Records	Themed around "six curses of mankind"	
18	Bloodbound	Unholy Cross	AFM Records		
18	Susanna Wallumrød	Jeg Vil Hjem Til Menneskene	Grappa Music	Lyrics by Gunvor Hofmo	
25	Divinefire	Eye of the Storm	Rivel Records		
25	Kampfar	Mare	Napalm Records	Produced by Peter Tägtgren	
25	Vintersorg	Jordpuls	Napalm	First of a planned 4-album concept series	
29	Amon Amarth	Surtur Rising	Metal Blade, Sony Music		

=== April ===
Day	Artist	Album	Label	Notes	Ref.
1	Illdisposed	There Is Light (But It's Not For Me)	Massacre Records		
1	Symfonia	In Paradisum	Avalon/Marquee	Joint project led by Andre Matos and Timo Tolkki	
13	Kikki Danielsson	Första dagen på resten av mitt liv	Sony Music Entertainment	First solo album since 1993	
13	Norther	Circle Regenerated	Century Media, Marquee Avalon, Spinefarm	The band's final full-length album	
15	Scar Symmetry	The Unseen Empire	Nuclear Blast		
17	Adam Tensta	Scared of the Dark	EMI		
19	Eva Eastwood	Lyckost	Border Music		
19	Leaves' Eyes	Melusine	Sonic Seducer magazine	EP	
22	Leaves' Eyes	Meredead	Napalm Records		
25	Above Symmetry	Ripples		Re-issued after band name change	
25	Bloodbath	Bloodbath over Bloodstock		DVD	
25	Wolf	Legions of Bastards	Century Media	Last album to feature Johannes Axeman Losbäck	
25	Yggdrasil	Irrbloss	Grand Master Music		
26	Vomitory	Opus Mortis VIII	Metal Blade Records		
27	Poisonblack	Drive	HYPE Records		
27	Ulver	Wars of the Roses	Jester Records, Kscope	First album to feature Daniel O'Sullivan	

=== May ===
Day	Artist	Album	Label	Notes	Ref.
6	Chrome Division	Third Round Knockout	Nuclear Blast		
10	Enslaved	The Sleeping Gods	Losen Records	EP	
24	In the Country	Sounds and Sights	Rune Grammofon	Live album	
30	Arch Enemy	Khaos Legions	Century Media		

=== June ===
Day	Artist	Album	Label	Notes	Ref.
6	Timbuktu	Sagolandet	BuDada Records		
15	In Flames	Sounds of a Playground Fading	Century Media	First album without founder Jesper Strömblad	
15	Tore Johansen	Nord	Inner Ear	with guest Odd Børretzen	
29	Eric Saade	Saade Vol. 1	Roxy Recordings		

=== July ===
Day	Artist	Album	Label	Notes	Ref.
22	Communic	The Bottom Deep	Nuclear Blast		
27	Svartsot	Maledictus Eris	Scarecrow Records		
27	Takida	The Burning Heart	Seven Records		
31	Jostein Gulbrandsen Trio	Release of Tension	Self-released		

=== August ===
Day	Artist	Album	Label	Notes	Ref.
5	Sabaton	World War Live: Battle of the Baltic Sea		Live album	
19	Ghost Brigade	Until Fear No Longer Defines Us	Season of Mist		
19	Humcrush with Sidsel Endresen	Ha!	Rune Grammofon		
23	Jørn Lande	Live in Black	Frontiers Records	Live double album	
24	Apostasy	Nuclear Messiah			

=== September ===
Day	Artist	Album	Label	Notes	Ref.
2	Mats Eilertsen	SkyDive	Hubro Music	With SkyDive Trio	
13	Opeth	Heritage	Roadrunner Records	Written and produced by Mikael Åkerfeldt	
17	Kjersti Stubø	How High Is the Sky	Bolage		
23	Hedvig Mollestad Trio	Shoot!	Rune Gramoffon		
23	Ragnhild Hemsing	Yr	Simax Classics		

=== October ===
Day	Artist	Album	Label	Notes	Ref.
11	Immortal Souls	IV: The Requiem for the Art of Death	Facedown Records		
14	Stein Urheim and Mari Kvien Brunvoll	Stein & Mari's Daydream Community	Jazzland Recordings	EP	
28	Isole	Born from Shadows	Napalm Records		

=== November ===
Day	Artist	Album	Label	Notes	Ref.
9	Elephant9	Live at the BBC	Rune Grammofon	Recorded in London, UK, November 2010	
11	Alog	Unemployed	Rune Grammofon		
11	Siri Nilsen	Alle Snakker Sant	Grappa Music		

=== December ===
Day	Artist	Album	Label	Notes	Ref.
2	Bugge Wesseltoft	Songs	Jazzland Recordings		
2	Hildegunn Øiseth	Stillness	Losen Records		
unknown date	Uno Svenningsson and Irma Schultz Keller	December - En svensk jul	Universal Music		

== Deaths ==
- 1 January – Flemming Jørgensen, Danish singer and actor, 63 (cardiac arrest)
- 17 January – Sjonni Brink, Icelandic singer-songwriter, 36 (stroke)
- 3 February – Eline Nygaard Riisnæs, Norwegian classical pianist and musicologist (born 1913).
- 6 February – Per Grundén, Swedish tenor, 88
- 24 February – Jens Winther, Danish jazz trumpeter, 50 (stroke)
- 2 March – Erling Kroner, Danish jazz trombonist, composer and bandleader
- 10 April – Børt-Erik Thoresen, television host and folk singer, 78
- 22 April – Eyvind Solås, classical pianist, composer, actor, and TV host, 73
- 24 April – Dag Stokke, Norwegian keyboardist TNT, church organist and mastering engineer, 44 (cancer)
- 31 May – Sølvi Wang, Norwegian pop and folk singer and actress, 81
- 4 June – Andreas P. Nielsen, Danish singer and composer, 58 (cancer)
- 18 June – Gustaf Kjellvander, Swedish singer-songwriter, 31
- 24 July – Harald Johnsen, Norwegian bassist, 71 (heart attack)
- 13 August
  - Topi Sorsakoski, Finnish singer, 58 (lung cancer)
  - Ellen Winther, Danish opera singer and actress, 78
- 4 September – Hilde Heltberg, Norwegian pop and folk singer songwriter, 51 (cancer).
- 8 October – Ingvar Wixell, Swedish operatic baritone, 80
- 11 October – Kim Brown, British-born Finnish rock musician, 66
- 19 October – Lars Sjösten, Swedish jazz pianist and composer
- 2 November
  - Arne "Papa" Bue Jensen, Danish trombonist and bandleader, 81
  - Sickan Carlsson, Swedish actress and singer, 96
