= 1879 in Nordic music =

The following is a list of notable events that occurred in the year 1879 in Nordic music.

== Events ==
- 1 November – Aged 14, Carl Nielsen becomes a bugler and alto trombonist in the band of the Danish army's 16th Battalion at Odense.
- Unknown date (after August) – Following the death of his wife, Henriette Nissen-Saloman, Danish violinist and composer Siegfried Saloman moves to Stockholm, Sweden, where he remains until his death in 1899.

== New works ==
- Agathe Backer Grøndahl – Menuet
- Niels Gade – En Sommerdag paa Landet
- Emil Hartmann
  - Cello Concerto, Op. 26
  - Symphony No. 1
- Johan Peter Emilius Hartmann – Opening Music for a University Anniversary
- Robert Kajanus – Lyrische Stücke, Op.2
- Amanda Röntgen-Maier – 6 Pieces for Violin and Piano
- Johan Svendsen
  - 5 Melodies, Songs, Op. 23
  - 4 Melodies, Songs, Op. 24

== Births ==
- 9 February – Natanael Berg, Swedish composer (died 1957)
- 27 May – Per Reidarson, Norwegian composer and music critic (died 1954)
- 31 July – Cally Monrad, Norwegian singer, actress and poet (died 1950).
- 5 October – Halfdan Cleve, Norwegian composer (died 1951).
- 7 October – Joe Hill (born Joel Emmanuel Hägglund), Swedish-American labor leader and songwriter (died 1915)
- 23 October – Johan Austbø, Norwegian teacher, dancer, poet, composer, singer, and proponent of Nynorsk (died 1945).
- 29 November – Jacob Gade, Danish violinist and composer (died 1963)
- 19 December – Otto Olsson, Swedish organist and composer (died 1964)

== Deaths ==
- 27 August – Henriette Nissen-Saloman, Swedish opera singer, 60
- 12 September – Peter Arnold Heise, Danish composer, 49
- 30 November – August Bournonville, Danish ballet master and choreographer, 74
