= 1913 in Nordic music =

The following is a list of notable events and compositions of the year 1913 in Nordic music.

== Events ==
- 10 September – Jean Sibelius's tone poem Luonnotar is premièred at the Three Choirs Festival in Gloucester Cathedral, UK, with an orchestra conducted by Herbert Brewer. The soloist is soprano Aino Ackté, to whom the work is dedicated.

== New works ==
- Paul von Klenau
  - Symphony No. 3
  - Symphony No. 4 (Dante-Symphony)
- Rued Langgaard – Symphony No. 1 "Klippepastoraler"
- Jean Sibelius
  - The Bard (later revised)
  - Two Serenades
  - Luonnotar
- Wilhelm Stenhammar – Reverenza

== Popular music ==
- Felix Körling – "Nej se det snöar"

== Births ==
- 9 March – Beate Asserson, Norwegian operatic mezzo-soprano (died 2000)
- 5 July – Eline Nygaard Riisnæs, Norwegian pianist and musicologist (died 2011).
- 12 July – Reino Helismaa, Finnish singer-songwriter (died 1965)
- 8 August – Axel Stordahl, American arranger and composer of Norwegian parentage (died 1963)
- 17 September – Jørgen Jersild, Danish composer and teacher (died 2004)
- 21 December – Amalie Christie, Norwegian pianist (died 2010)
- 30 December – Svend S. Schultz, Danish composer and conductor (died 1998)

== Deaths ==
- 20 March – Christian Barnekow, Danish composer (born 1837)
- 20 April – Theodor Løvstad, Norwegian kapellmeister and songwriter (born 1843)
- 17 June – Ingeborg Bronsart von Schellendorf, Finnish-Swedish pianist and composer (born 1840)

== See also ==
- 1913 in Denmark
- 1913 in Norwegian music
- 1913 in Sweden
