= 1957 in Nordic music =

The following is a list of notable events and compositions of the year 1957 in Nordic music.

== Events ==
- 3 March – The 2nd Eurovision Song Contest is held in West Germany. The only Scandinavian country to enter is Denmark, represented by Birthe Wilke and Gustav Winckler, singing "Skibet skal sejle i nat", which finishes in third place.
- 1 July – Nina & Frederik, not yet a married couple, make their professional performing debut at Mon Cœur, a nightclub in Copenhagen.
- 29 September – Finland's celebrated composer, Jean Sibelius, lies in state overnight, following a short memorial service at which musicians from the Helsinki Philharmonic Orchestra and Radio Symphony Orchestra carry his coffin into Helsinki Cathedral while Tapani Valsta plays the organ.
- 30 September – The state funeral of Jean Sibelius is held at Helsinki Cathedral. Many of Sibelius's own compositions are played. Aino Sibelius and Finland's president, Urho Kekkonen, lay wreaths, and composers Uuno Klami and Einojuhani Rautavaara are among the bearers. The coffin is taken to his home at Ainola for burial.

== New works ==
- Erik Bergman – Tre aspetti d’una serie dodecafonica
- Lars-Erik Larsson – Concertino for piano and string orchestra
- Einojuhani Rautavaara – Symphony No. 2
- Geirr Tveitt – Nykken

== Popular music ==
- Knut Brodin & Lennart Hellsing – "Hej, sa Petronella"
- Valto Laitinen – "Kun syksy saapuu Helsinkiin"
- Owe Thörnqvist – "Ett litet rött paket"

== New recordings ==
- Jussi Björling – "Nu Är Jag Pank Och Fågelfri"
- Grethe and Jørgen Ingmann – "Slentre Gennem Regn"/"Kun en drømmer"

== Film music ==
- Gunnar Sønstevold & Maj Sønstevold – Fjols til fjells

== Births ==
- 22 May – Anne Grete Preus, Norwegian rock singer (died 2019)
- unknown date – Karin Rehnqvist

== Deaths ==
- 7 July – Hiski Salomaa, Finnish folk singer and songwriter (born 1891)
- 28 August – Erik Tuxen, Danish conductor and composer and arranger (born 1902)
- 23 August – Lille Bror Söderlundh, Swedish singer and composer (born 1912)
- 19 September – Heino Kaski, Finnish composer (born 1885)
- 20 September
  - Edvard Bræin, Norwegian conductor and composer (born 1887)
  - Jean Sibelius, Finnish composer (born 1865)
- 14 October – Natanael Berg, Swedish composer (born 1879)

== See also ==
- 1957 in Denmark
- 1957 in Iceland
- 1957 in Norwegian music
- 1957 in Sweden
