= 1915 in Nordic music =

The following is a list of notable events and compositions of the year 1915 in Nordic music.

== Events ==
- March – Carl Nielsen succeeds Franz Xaver Neruda as a director of the Copenhagen music society and composes a Prologue for recitation and orchestra In memoriam Franz Neruda.
- 8 December – Jean Sibelius conducts the world première of his Symphony No. 5 at his own 50th birthday concert in Helsinki.

== New works ==
- Gustaf Hägg – Legend for pump organ
- Ture Rangström – Gammal bonde for voice and piano
- Jean Sibelius – Violin Sonatina
- Wilhelm Stenhammar – Symphony No. 2 in G minor, Op 34

== Popular music ==
- "Ritsch, ratsch, filibom" (first publication of traditional Swedish Christmas song)

== Births ==
- 13 January – Aino Bergö, Swedish singer and dancer (died 1944)
- 23 January – Aage Samuelsen, Norwegian evangelist, singer, and composer (died 1987)
- 8 May – Arvid Fladmoe, Norwegian composer and conductor (died 1993)
- 13 May – Ingeborg Cook, US-born Norwegian actress and singer (died 2003)
- 11 June – Ebbe Grims-land Swedish viola and mandolin player and composer (died 2015)
- 21 August – Raquel Rastenni, Danish-Russian singer (died 1998)
- 3 September – Knut Nystedt, Norwegian orchestral and choral composer (died 2014)
- 23 September – Finn Arnestad, Norwegian contemporary composer and musician (died 1994).
- 25 October – Torleiv Bolstad, Norwegian fiddle player (died 1979)
- 14 November – Jens Book Jenssen, Norwegian singer, songwriter, revue artist, and theatre director (died 1998)

== Deaths ==
- 2 January – Bertha Tammelin, Swedish operatic mezzo-soprano, pianist and composer (born 1836)
- 24 January – Thorvald Hansen, Danish trumpeter and composer (born 1847)
- 19 March – Franz Xaver Neruda, Czech-Danish cellist and composer (born 1843)
- 5 October – Otto Malling, Danish organist and composer (born 1848)
- 19 November – Joe Hill (born Joel Emmanuel Hägglund), Swedish-American labor leader and songwriter (born 1879; executed by firing squad in the United States)

== See also ==
- 1915 in Denmark
- 1915 in Norwegian music
- 1915 in Sweden
