= Fête galante (disambiguation) =

Fête galante or Fêtes galantes is a genre of painting depicting the festive amusements of 18th century French aristocrats.

Fête galante may also refer to:

== Music ==
- Fête Galante (Smyth), opera by Ethel Smyth
- Fête Galante (Schierbeck), opera by Poul Schierbeck
- Fête Galante, ballet choreographed by Ib Andersen
- Fete Galante, composition for wind orchestra by Joseph Horovitz
- Fête galante and collections Fêtes galantes Sets 1 and 2, compositions by Claude Debussy for voice and piano
- Fêtes galantes, composition by Reine Colaço Osorio-Swaab
- Fêtes galantes, a composition by Reynaldo Hahn for voice and piano
- Fêtes galantes, a composition by Francis Poulenc for voice
- Fêtes galantes, two compositions by Willem Pijper for voice

== Other ==
- Fêtes galantes, book by Paul Kenis
- Fêtes galantes, poetry collection by Paul Verlaine
- Les fêtes galantes, film directed by René Clair
