= Riisnæs =

Riisnæs is a surname. Notable people with the surname include:

- Anne Eline Riisnæs (born 1951), Norwegian pianist and piano pedagog
- Dag Riisnæs (born 1969), Norwegian footballer
- Eline Nygaard Riisnæs (1913–2011), Norwegian pianist and musicologist
- Knut Riisnæs (born 1945), Norwegian musician, arranger, and composer
- Magnus Riisnæs (born 2004), Norwegian footballer
- Odd Riisnæs (born 1953), Norwegian musician and composer
- Sverre Riisnæs (1897–1988), Norwegian jurist, public prosecutor, and Nazi collaborator
