= Axel Borup-Jørgensen =

Danish composer

Axel Borup-Jørgensen (22 November 1924 – 15 October 2012) was a Danish composer. He was born in Hjørring in Denmark, but grew up in Sweden. He died in Birkerød.

He studied piano at the Royal Danish Academy of Music in Copenhagen. As a composer, apart from studies in instrumentation with Poul Schierbeck and Jørgen Jersild, he is self-taught. He emerged on the international spotlight when his Nordisk Sommerpastorale, Op. 51 (Nordic Summer Pastoral, 1964) won first prize in the competition for a short orchestral work held by Denmarks Radio in 1965. Borup-Jørgensen was one of the first Danish composers to go to the Darmstädter Ferienkurse (1959 and 1962), but he never composed serial music. While the avant-garde of the sixties exerted a strong influence on his sound world, he always followed his own intuition and obeyed his extraordinary sense of organizing sound combined with a passionate, almost mystical regard for nature. Nevertheless, his encounter with Ligeti's early orchestral works and the works of the Swedish composer Bo Nilsson left traces in his output from the 1960s, primarily in the orchestral work Marin (‘Marine’) op.60 (1963–70), a large symphonic suite that includes 44 individual string lines. Marin is one of his more notable compositions and is regarded by many as his masterpiece.

Borup-Jørgensen once said: ‘To compose is not to do what one can; if anything good is to come out of it, one must surpass oneself.’ His prolific output includes music for orchestra, chamber music, and vocal and instrumental works. Among his important works are Nordisk Sommerpastorale, Marin, Sirenernes kyst (‘The Coast of Sirens’) for seven instruments and tape (1985) and Thalatta! Thalatta! for piano op.127 (1987).
