= 1964 in Nordic music =

The following is a list of notable events and compositions of the year 1964 in Nordic music.

== Events ==
- 21 March – The 9th Eurovision Song Contest is held in Copenhagen, and presented by Denmark's Lotte Wæver. The contest is won by Italy. Of the Scandinavian countries, Finland finish 7th, Norway 8th and Denmark 9th.
- 12 May – At the 8th Annual Grammy Awards, Kai Winding is nominated in the Best Performance by an Orchestra or Instrumentalist with Orchestra category for "More".
- Autumn – A "jazz weekend" is organised as a precursor to the Kongsberg Jazzfestival in Norway.

== New works ==
- Eyvin Andersen – Concerto for Violin and Orchestra
- Hilding Rosenberg – Sönerna (Cain and Abel), ballet, for orchestra
- Dag Wirén – Symphony No. 5

== Popular music ==
- Carl Christian Bøyesen (C. C. Bøyesen) – "Min lille pa-papegøye", performed by Frank Cooks Orkester
- Susanne Palsbo and Thore Skogman – "Lille fregnede Louise", performed by Johnny Reimar

== New recordings ==
- Nicolai Gedda plays the male lead in a recording of Georges Bizet's Carmen, opposite Maria Callas, with Georges Prêtre conducting the Paris Opera Orchestra.

== Eurovision Song Contest ==
- Denmark in the Eurovision Song Contest 1964
- Finland in the Eurovision Song Contest 1964
- Norway in the Eurovision Song Contest 1964
- Sweden in the Eurovision Song Contest 1964

== Film music ==
- Sven Gyldmark – Kampen om Næsbygård
- Jørgen Jersild – Gertrud
- Erik Nordgren – Klänningen

== Births ==
- 13 May – Harald Devold, Norwegian jazz saxophonist (died 2016).

== Deaths ==
- 27 March – Emil Reesen, Danish pianist, conductor and composer (born 1887)
- 1 May – Håkan von Eichwald, Finnish-Swedish bandleader and conductor (born 1908)
- 18 June – Egil Rasmussen, Norwegian author, literature critic and pianist (born 1903)
- 1 July – Sigurd Islandsmoen, Norwegian organist and composer (born 1881).
- 15 August – Eino Kettunen, Finnish composer and lyricist (born 1894)
- 1 September – Otto Olsson, Swedish organist and composer (born 1879
- 4 October – Set Svanholm, Swedish operatic tenor (born 1904)

== See also ==
- 1964 in Denmark
- 1964 in Iceland
- 1964 in Norwegian music
- 1964 in Sweden
