= 1998 in Nordic music =

The following is a list of notable events and releases that happened in Nordic music in 1998.

== Events ==
- 3 April – On the first day of Norway's Vossajazz festival, Sigurd Ulveseth wins the festival prize
- 9 May – The 43rd Eurovision Song Contest is held in the UK with Swedish-born Ulrika Jonsson as one of the presenters. Of the Scandinavian countries participating, Norway, represented by Lars A. Fredriksen, finishes in 8th place; Sweden, represented by Jill Johnson, finishes 8th; and Finland, represented by Edea, finishes 15th.
- 20 May – John Fernström's ballet Ni-Si-Pleng receives its première at the Gothenburg Opera, 37 years after the composer's death, having been interrupted during the 1940s.
- 19 June – Thomas Vinterberg's film, Festen is released in Denmark; it would later be adapted into an opera by Mark-Anthony Turnage.

== Classical works ==
- Hans Gefors – Clara (opera)
- Frederik Magle – Cæciliemusik (Music for Saint Cecilia)
- Einojuhani Rautavaara – Piano Concerto No. 3 "Gift of Dreams"

== Film and television scores ==
- Lars Bo Jensen – The Celebration

== Top hit singles ==
- Children of Bodom – "Children of Bodom" (#1 Finland)
- Dr. Bombay – "Calcutta (Taxi Taxi Taxi)" (#1 Sweden)
- Drömhus – "Vill ha dig" (#1 Denmark, Norway, Sweden; #3 Finland)
- E-Type – "Here I Go Again" (#1 Sweden, Finland; #3 Norway; #4 Denmark)
- Infernal – "Kalinka" (#1 Denmark)
- Jill Johnson – "Kärleken är" (#5 Sweden)
- Lene Marlin – "Unforgivable Sinner" (#1 Norway; #4 Sweden)
- S.O.A.P. – "This Is How We Party" (#1 Sweden; #3 Denmark)

== Eurovision Song Contest ==
- Finland in the Eurovision Song Contest 1998
- Norway in the Eurovision Song Contest 1998
- Sweden in the Eurovision Song Contest 1998

== Births ==
- 23 January – Thomas Meilstrup, Danish singer and actor, son of Gry Meilstrup
- 25 April – Ella Marie Hætta Isaksen, Norwegian Sami singer and yoiker
- 21 May – Ari Ólafsson, Icelandic singer
- 24 July – Hugo Helmig, Danish singer-songwriter (died 2022)

== Deaths ==
- 20 May – Robert Normann, Norwegian jazz guitarist (born 1916)
- 3 June – Poul Bundgaard, Danish actor and singer (born 1922)
- 6 June – Svend S. Schultz, Danish composer and conductor (born 1913)
- 14 June – Hans W. Brimi, Norwegian fiddler (born 1917)
- 14 July – Herman David Koppel, Danish composer (born 1908)
- 17 August – Raquel Rastenni, Danish-Russian singer (born 1915)
- 7 November – Börje Mellvig, lyricist, actor and director (born 1911)
- 4 December – Egil Johansen, Norwegian-Swedish jazz drummer, composer and teacher (born 1934)
