= 1954 in Nordic music =

The following is a list of notable events and compositions of the year 1954 in Nordic music.

== Events ==
- unknown date
  - Einojuhani Rautavaara wins the Thor Johnson Brass Composition Award for his composition A Requiem in Our Time. Another Finnish composer, Usko Meriläinen, wins second place in the same competition with his Partita for Brass.
  - Geirr Tveitt begins publishing his collection of Hardanger folk tunes as a suite.
  - Uuno Klami finishes re-writing his Violin Concerto, the original manuscript of which was lost in 1944.

== New works ==
- Carl-Olof Anderberg – Musical vignettes for Charlotte Löwensköld
- Olallo Morales – Festspel
- Lille Bror Söderlundh – Incidental music for Mariana Pineda

== Popular music ==
- Thorbjørn Egner – "Visen om vesle Hoa" (also translated from Norwegian into Finnish as "Hottentottilaulu" by Jukka Virtanen)

== Film music ==
- Egon Kjerrman – En natt på Glimmingehus
- Egil Monn-Iversen – Kasserer Jensen
- Lille Bror Söderlundh – Storm over Tjurö
- Jules Sylvain – Dans på rosor

== Musical films ==
- I rök och dans, with music by Povel Ramel, Charles Redland and Lille Bror Söderlundh

== Births ==
- 14 January – Gunnar Andreas Berg, Norwegian guitarist, music teacher, and record label manager
- 13 April – Niels "Noller" Olsen, of Denmark's Olsen Brothers
- 27 April – Heikki Silvennoinen, Finnish musician and actor (died 2024)
- 31 May – Anders Hillborg, Swedish composer
- 12 June – Jesper Lundgaard, Danish jazz musician and composer
- 11 December – Guðlaugur Kristinn Óttarsson, Icelandic heavy metal musician

== Deaths ==
- 21 January – Per Reidarson, Norwegian composer and music critic (born 1879)
- 6 October – Hakon Børresen, Danish composer (born 1876)

== See also ==
- 1954 in Denmark
- 1954 in Iceland
- 1954 in Norwegian music
- 1954 in Sweden
