= Feeding the Machine =

Studio album by Wolf
- Released: March 13, 2020
- Genres: Heavy metal, power metal
- Length: 46:54
- Label: Century Media
- Producer: Simon Johansson

Wolf chronology
Devil Seed (2014)	Feeding the Machine (2020)	Shadowland (2022)

Feeding the Machine is the eighth studio album by Swedish heavy metal band Wolf, released on 13 March 2020 via Century Media Records. It is the first album featuring band's new members, Johan Koleberg on drums and Pontus Egberg on bass guitar. The album is being produced by Wolf's Simon Johansson at SolnaSound Production and mixed and mastered by Fredrik Nordström of Studio Fredman.

== Background ==
In an interview in December 2018, Niklas Stålvind revealed that the band is working on a new album and they want to get back to the roots of the old school Wolf. He stated that the album will have ten or twelve songs but he was not sure about the release date. On 30 September 2019, Wolf announced the separation of Modd and Holmgren from the band and revealed the new line up featuring King Diamond bass player, Pontus Egberg and ex-HammerFall drummer, Johan Koleberg. The band also revealed the title and release date of the album. In another interview with Mohsen Stargazer Fayazi of Metal Shock Finland on 8 October 2019, Stålvind explains why it took them longer to bring their new album to the light, he stated that he wrote the first song for this album in 2015 but mainly because all members of the band were busy with their full jobs they were not able to make it faster. Then he explained the concept and idea behind the title of the album which is the role and affection of social networks on people's normal life and minds. He explains: "When I was unemployed, I used social media to sell my artworks...But around 2016, I started to noticed, what the f*ck is this, it’s not me using Facebook anymore, it’s Facebook using me. It’s so manipulative and it just make people gather in small groups hating each other and I felt something is really wrong there."

On 17 December 2019, Wolf announced tour dates with Grand Magus, including eighteen shows in the UK, France, Netherlands and Germany which were later canceled after their show in London duo to the COVID-19 pandemic.

The band revealed artwork and track-listing for the album on January 10, 2020, including twelve tracks and a cover version of Angel Witch's 'Atlanta' single as a bonus track on the Limited Edition CD Digipak and also on the CD coming along with the LP.

Wolf released a video clip for 'Midnight Hour' single on January 19, 2020, the video was directed by Daniel Wahlström and it is the first appearance of the band's new members, Johan Koleberg and Pontus Egberg on a video. on February 14 the same year, band posted a lyric video for ‘Shoot to Kill’ single, the video was produced by Iranian metal man Mohsen “Stargazer” Fayazi. Niklas comments on the single: "Fist waving, fast and straight up in-your-face-metal in the classic WOLF vein. Perfect for banging your head". The third single of the band was released with a video for the title track of the album on March 6, 2020.

== Reception ==
Professional ratings
Review scores
Source	Rating
Brave Words & Bloody Knuckles	8/10 stars
Blabbermouth.net	8/10 stars
Metal.de	8/10 stars
metal-temple.com	9/10 stars

The album has received mostly positive reviews from music critics, praising it for being loyal to the band's traditional music style, a new-wave-of-old-school heavy metal.

Dom Lawson of Blabbermouth praised the album as a classic WOLF album, rather than some self-conscious attempt to resurrect 1982's leather-bound sounds that delivers multiple jolting doses of the real goddamn thing. BraveWords's Mark Gromen praised songs 'Shoot To Kill', 'Spoon Bender', 'Guillotine' and 'Devil In The Flesh' and wrote "easily my favorite Wolf disc in more than a decade. Highly recommended for old fans, as well as interested newcomers."

== Track listing ==
All lyrics are written by Niklas Stålvind.

Feeding the Machine track listing
No.	Title	Writer(s)	Length
1.	"Shoot to Kill"	Stålvind	3:41
2.	"Guillotine"	Stålvind	4:04
3.	"Dead Man’s Hand"	Stålvind	3:09
4.	"Midnight Hour"	Stålvind, Johansson	3:22
5.	"Mass Confusion"	Stålvind, Johansson, Modd	4:12
6.	"The Cold Emptiness"	Johansson	3:48
7.	"Feeding the Machine"	Stålvind	3:51
8.	"Devil in the Flesh"	Stålvind	3:18
9.	"Spoon Bender"	Stålvind	3:26
10.	"The Raven"	Stålvind	4:29
11.	"Black Widow"	Stålvind	4:00
12.	"A Thief Inside"	Stålvind	5:34
Total length:			46:54

== Personnel ==
Wolf

- Niklas Stålvind – vocals, guitar
- Simon Johansson – guitar
- Pontus Egberg – bass guitar
- Johan Koleberg – drums

Additional personnel

- Produced by Simon Johansson
- Mixed and mastered by Fredrick Nordstörm
- Engineered by Simon Johansson and Mike Wead
- Artwork by Thomas Holm
- Photography by Therés Björk

== See also ==
- List of 2020 albums
