= Mulmets Viser =

Studio album by Svartsot
- Released: March 26, 2010
- Recorded: LSD Tonstudio, Germany.
- Genres: Folk metal, viking metal
- Length: 51:03
- Label: Napalm
- Producer: Lasse Lammert

Svartsot chronology
Ravnenes Saga (2007)	Mulmets Viser (2010)	Maledictus Eris (2011)

Mulmets Viser is the second album from the Danish folk/Viking metal band Svartsot.

== Track listing ==
1. "Thelred" - 3:32
2. "Lokkevisen" - 3:45
3. "Havfruens Kvad" - 4:05
4. "Højen på Glødende Pæle" - 3:58
5. "På Odden af Hans Hedenske Sværd" - 5:07
6. "Laster og Tarv" - 3:38
7. "Den Svarte Sot" - 6:16
8. "Kromandens Datter" - 3:55
9. "Grendel" - 2:52
10. "Jagten" - 4:29
11. "Lindisfarne" - 3:51
12. "I Salens Varme Glød" - 5:36

=== Limited edition bonus tracks ===
1. "Visen om Tærskeren" - 4:39
2. "Den Døde Mand" - 5:56

== Credits ==
- Thor Bager - Vocals
- Cristoffer J.S. Frederiksen - lead guitar, mandolin, acoustic guitar
- Cliff Nemanim - Rhythm guitars
- James Atkin - Bass
- Danni Jelsgaard - Drums
- Hans-Jørgen Martinus Hansen - Irish whistles, mandolin, Accordion, bodhran and other instruments
