= Devil Seed =

Studio album by Wolf
- Released: 25 August 2014
- Genres: Heavy metal, power metal
- Length: 47:12
- Label: Century Media
- Producer: Jens Bogren

Wolf chronology
Legions of Bastards (2011)	Devil Seed (2014)	Feeding the Machine (2020)

Professional ratings
Review scores
Source	Rating
Brave Words & Bloody Knuckles	8/10 stars
Metal Underground	4/5 stars
Sputnikmusic	3.5/5 stars
Metal Shock Finland	9.5/10 stars

Devil Seed is the seventh studio album by Swedish heavy metal band Wolf, which was released on 25 August 2014 via Century Media Records.

== Background ==
In March 2013, Metal Shock Finland posted a photo of guitarist and vocalist Niklas Stålvind, which shows him playing guitar and claimed that he is busy with writing for their upcoming album in the Viper Studio.

Later on May 8, 2014, the band tweeted a picture of drummer Richard Holmgren recording “smoking drums” and announced that they are in the process of recording bonus tracks.

Wolf premiered a lyric video for the track "My Demon" over at Metal Hammer's website on 6 June 2014.

The album's cover artwork was revealed on June 16, 2014, which was created again by Thomas Holm. The band teamed up with Jens Bogren at Fascination Street Studios. Century Media Records announced that the album will be released on August 25 in Europe and on September 2 in North America.

Wolf announced a UK and European touring schedule to promote the album, shortly after the release of Devil Seed.

On July 23, 2014, the band posted a video teaser for the ‘Shark Attack’ video on YouTube. Seven days later, on July 30, the video was premiered by Metal Hammer UK again.

== Reception ==
The album has received mostly positive reviews, with critics praising it for speedy guitar riffs and darker themes. Chris Chantler of British Metal Hammer reviewed the album positively saying that Devil Seed is "a far more varied and rounded, and rather darker, album than usual." Bravewords 's Mark Gromen described album as " a sleek construction, devoid of frills, just killing technology. Simple, speedy, guitar driven anthems with easy-to-sing, repetitive choruses." Also Metal Shock Finland 's Mohsen Fayyazi reviewed this album, saying that the album is "absolutely a milestone in WOLF’s career, a point made of knowledge, genius and bravery."

== Track listing ==
* All Lyrics were written by Niklas Stålvind

No.	Title	Writer(s)	Length
1.	"Overture in C Shark"	Stålvind, Johansson, Modd	2:22
2.	"Shark Attack"	Stålvind	3:27
3.	"Skeleton Woman"	Stålvind, Johansson	4:52
4.	"Surgeons Of Lobotomy"	Stålvind	4:08
5.	"My Demon"	Stålvind, Johansson, Modd	3:58
6.	"I Am Pain"	Stålvind	3:38
7.	"Back From The Grave"	Stålvind	4:24
8.	"The Dark Passenger"	Stålvind, Holmgren	5:35
9.	"River Everlost"	Stålvind, Modd	5:19
10.	"Frozen"	Stålvind, Johansson	4:14
11.	"Killing Floor"	Stålvind, Johansson, Modd	5:21
Total length:			47:12

== Personnel ==
Band

- Niklas Stålvind – vocals, guitar
- Simon Johansson – guitar
- Anders G Modd – bass guitar
- Richard A Holmgren – drums

Production

- Produced, engineered, mixed and mastered by Jens Bogren
- Artwork by Thomas Holm
