= Anna de Belocca =

Russian opera singer

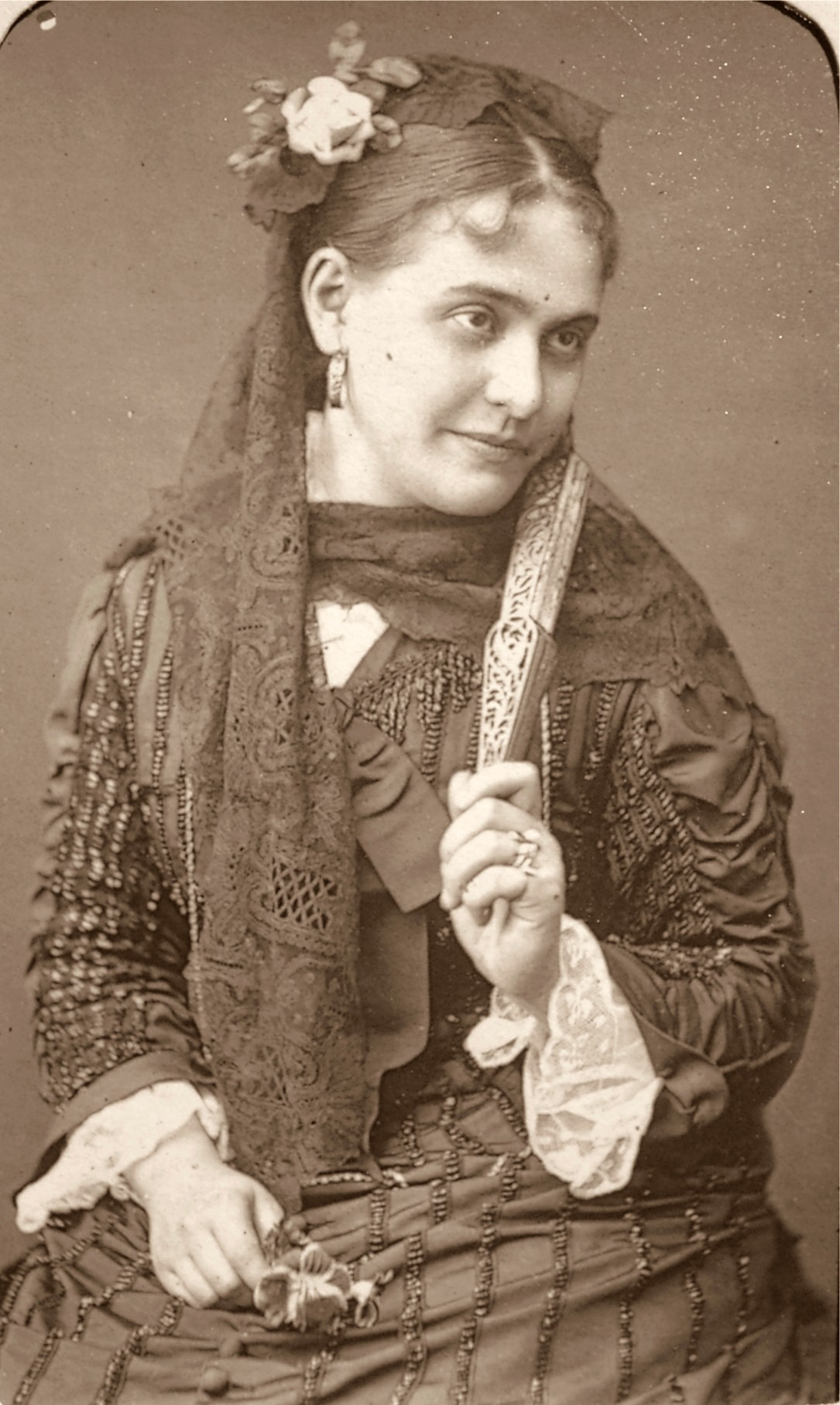
Anna de Belocca

Anna de Belocca (née de Bellokh) (4 January 1854 – unknown) was a Russian-born operatic contralto.

== Biography ==
De Belocca was born in St. Petersburg, where her father was an Imperial Russian Councilor of State. After studying in St. Petersburg with Henriette Nissen-Saloman and in Paris with Nicolas Lablache and Maurice Strakosch, she made her stage debut in Paris at the Théâtre Italien as Rosina in The Barber of Seville. She also appeared there in the title role of La Cenerentola and as Arsace in Semiramide.

She appeared in various cities in Europe, including London, where she made her debut with opera manager James Henry Mapleson's company. She then became a member of the Strakosch Opera Company, with whom she made her American debut on 17 April 1876 as Rosina at New York's Academy of Music. She also appeared in concerts in Boston, Chicago, Philadelphia and San Francisco. With the Mapleson company, she continued to sing leading roles in New York and Philadelphia through the 1880s.
