= The Black Flame (album) =

Studio album by Wolf
- Released: September 25, 2006
- Genre: Heavy metal
- Label: Century Media
- Producer: Fredrik Nordström

Wolf chronology
Evil Star (2004)	The Black Flame (2006)	Ravenous (2009)

The Black Flame, released in 2006, is an album by Swedish heavy metal band Wolf.

== Track listing ==
1. "I Will Kill Again" (Stålvind / Goding) - 4:59
2. "At the Graveyard" (Stålvind) - 4:25
3. "Black Magic" (Stålvind) - 5:19
4. "The Bite" (Stålvind / Goding) - 5:07
5. "Make Friends with Your Nightmares" (Stålvind) - 5:10
6. "Demon" (Stålvind / Goding) - 5:03
7. "The Dead" (Stålvind / Goding / Losbäck / Kellgren) - 4:23
8. "Seize the Night" (Stålvind) - 4:08
9. "Steelwinged Savage Reaper" (Stålvind / Goding / Losbäck) - 3:09
10. "Children of the Black Flame" (Stålvind / Goding) - 5:50

== Credits ==
=== Band line-up ===
- Niklas Stålvind - Guitar & Lead vocals
- Johannes Losbäck - Guitar & Backing vocals
- Mikael Goding - Bass guitar
- Tobias Kellgren - Drums
