= Poul Schierbeck =

Danish composer and organist

Poul Schierbeck (8 June 1888 – 9 February 1949) was a Danish composer and organist. He was a pupil of Carl Nielsen and Thomas Laub. From 1931 he taught composition and instrumentation at the Royal Danish Academy of Music. His pupils include Axel Borup-Jørgensen, Jørgen Jersild, Leif Kayser, Svend S. Schultz, and Leif Thybo.

He composed the music for Carl Theodor Dreyer's movie Day of Wrath, and Dreyer also used his music for the movie The Word. Other works include the opera Fête galante.
