= Leif Kayser =

Danish composer and organist

Leif Kayser (13 June 1919 – 15 June 2001) was a Danish composer and organist.

He was born in Copenhagen, the son of geographer Olaf Ivar Monrad Kayser (1893–1928) and Hedwig Martha Nick (1877–1972).

Kayser began studies at the Royal Danish Academy of Music in 1936, where he was a student of Poul Schierbeck. In Stockholm, he studied composition with Hilding Rosenberg and orchestral conducting with Thurs Mann. Kayser debuted 1941 as pianist in Copenhagen and as conductor in Gothenburg.

After theological studies in Rome, Kayser was ordained in 1949 and served as pastor and organist of St. Ansgar Roman Catholic cathedral in Copenhagen until 1964, after which he was employed as a teacher of instrumentation and score analysis at the Royal Danish Academy of Music.

== Works ==
Kayser was one of the leading Danish organ composers of the 20th century. Among his major works for the instrument are four suites and the big Concerto per Organo from 1965.

=== Organ music ===
- 3 Improvisazioni
- Paraphrase of Gregorian motives
- Variations on "In dulci jubilo"
- Fantasia – Arabesco – Corale (1953–55)
- Sonatina
- Suite caratteristica (1956)
- Suite No. 2
- Suite No. 3
- Suite No. 4 (1973)
- Requiem, 11 meditazioni per organo
- Variazioni pasquali (1957–60)
- Concerto (1965)
- Christmas Hymn Games
- Sonata
- Fantasia e INNO (1969)
- Entrata real
- Church Windows
- Pezzi Sacri I / II
- Toccata sopra "Ave Maria"
- 3 Maria frescoes (1979–82)
- 2 pcs sinfonici
- Hymn to Duke Knud (1986)
- Lauda board salvatorem (1992)
