= Ravnenes Saga =

Studio album by Svartsot
- Released: November 2, 2007
- Recorded: Hansen Studios, Denmark.
- Genre: Folk metal Viking metal
- Length: 42:56
- Label: Napalm Records
- Producer: Jacob Hansen

Svartsot chronology
Tvende Ravne (2007)	Ravnenes Saga (2007)	Mulmets Viser (2010)

Ravnenes Saga is the debut studio album by the Danish folk and Viking metal band Svartsot. It was the band's first full-length release.

== Track listing ==
1. "Gravøllet" – 4:36
2. "Tvende Ravne" – 4:14
3. "Nidvisen" – 4:34
4. "Jotunheimsfærden" – 4:03
5. "Bersærkergang" – 4:42
6. "Hedens Døtre" – 4:13
7. "Festen" – 3:14
8. "Spillemandens Dåse" – 3:40
9. "Skovens Kælling" – 3:03
10. "Skønne Møer" – 4:21
11. "Brages Bæger" – 3:05
12. "Havets Plage" – 4:35

=== Limited edition bonus tracks ===
1. "Drekar" – 4:12
2. "Hævnen" – 3:43

== Credits ==
- Claus B. Gnudtzmann - Vocals
- Cristoffer J.S. Frederiksen - Lead guitar
- Stewart Lewis - Flutes, bodhran
- Michael L. Andersen - Rhythm guitar
- Niels P. Thøgersen - Drums
- Martin Kielland-Brandt - Bass
