= Ravenous (Wolf album) =

Studio album by Wolf
- Released: February 25th, 2009
- Recorded: Studio Seven, Örebro, Sweden
- Genre: Heavy metal
- Label: Century Media
- Producer: Roy Z

Wolf chronology
The Black Flame (2006)	Ravenous (2009)	Legions of Bastards (2011)

Ravenous is Wolf's fifth studio album produced by Roy Z. It was the debut Wolf album appearance for both bassist Anders Modd and drummer Richard Holmgren.

== Track listing ==
1. "Speed On" (Stålvind / Axeman) - 3:46
2. "Curse You Salem" (Stålvind / Axeman) - 3:52
3. "Voodoo" (Stålvind) - 4:17
4. "Hail Caesar" (Stålvind / Axeman) - 3:48
5. "Ravenous" (Stålvind / Axeman) - 3:57
6. "Mr Twisted" (Stålvind / Axeman) - 3:53
7. "Love At First Bite" (Stålvind / Roy Z) - 3:48
8. "Secrets We Keep" (Stålvind / Modd) - 4:50
9. "Whisky Psycho Hellions" (Stålvind) - 4:41
10. "Hiding In Shadows" (Stålvind / Modd) - 4:18
11. "Blood Angel" (Stålvind / Axeman) - 6:25
12. "6 Steps" (Japan bonus track) - 4:53

== Reception ==
Professional ratings
Review scores
Source	Rating
Lords of Metal	(74/100)
Digital steel	(91/100)
Danger Dog	4/5 stars

== Personnel ==
=== Band line-up ===
- Niklas Stålvind - Guitar & lead vocals
- Johannes "Axeman" Losbäck - Guitar & backing vocals
- Anders Modd - Bass guitar
- Richard Holmgren - Drums

=== Other ===
- Roy Z - Producer, Mixing, Acoustic Guitar on "Blood Angel"
- Peter in de Betou - Mastering
- Hank Shermann - First guitar solo on "Ravenous"
- Mark Boals - Backing vocals on "Love At First Bite"
- Thomas Holm - Cover painting
