= Anne Eline Riisnæs =

Norwegian pianist and piano pedagog (born 1951)

- Born: April 15, 1951 (age 74); Oslo, Norway
- Genres: Classical music
- Occupation(s): Musician and musicologist
- Instrument: Piano
- Labels: OffTheRecords
- Website: www.hf.uio.no/imv/personer/vit/anneeri

Anne Eline Riisnæs (born 15 April 1951) is a Norwegian pianist and piano pedagog.

== Early life ==
Riisnæs was born in Oslo. Her mother was Eline Nygaard Riisnæs, a pianist. Riisnæs's brothers are Knut Riisnæs (1945–2023), a jazz saxophonist, and Odd Riisnæs (1953–), saxophonist.

== Career ==
Riisnæs debuted 1977 in Oslo, and the following year she received her diploma at Norges Musikkhøgskole. Later she studied in Wien, Austria and has held many concerts both in Norway and internationally as a soloist and accompanist. She has been a soloist with both Oslo-Filharmonien and Bergen Filharmoniske Orkester, and the symphony orchestras of Economics and Stavanger. Besides a number of recordings in NRK, she has done several school concert tours for Rikskonsertene. In recent years she has been involved in performance practice, and also plays the fortepiano. She has received a number of public and private grants.

Riisnæs is employed at the Department of Musicology, University of Oslo, and at the Norges Musikkhøgskole, and debuted on record with Return where she played Sonata Hob. XVI/52, L. 62 in E flat major by Joseph Haydn, Fantasies op. 116 by Johannes Brahms, Sonata op. 1 by Alban Berg and Preludes by George Gershwin.

== Discography ==
- 2011: Return (OffTheRecords), med Sonate Hob. XVI/52, L. 62 i Ess-dur av Joseph Haydn, Fantasier op. 116 av Johannes Brahms, Sonate op. 1 av Alban Berg og Preludier av George Gershwin
- 2010: Oboe Sonatas, med Brynjar Hoff
