= Ebbe Grims-land =

Swedish musician

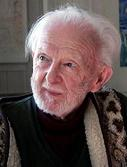
In the 2000s

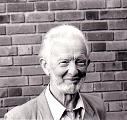
From the 1970s

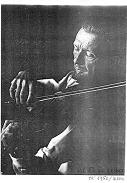
From the 1950s

Ebbe Grims-land

Ebbe Grims-land (June 11, 1915 – January 27, 2015) was a Swedish composer and viola player. He was also one of Sweden's foremost mandolin players. Grims-land was born in Malmö and died in Bagarmossen, Enskede, Stockholm.

Grims-land made his debut as violinist in Malmö in 1932 and has studied in Copenhagen, Stockholm and Vienna. From 1943 until 1974, he was a violist with the Swedish Radio Symphony Orchestra and other Stockholm ensembles. Grims-land's first compositions written in the 1930s, were for chamber orchestra. He was an early member of Föreningen Svenska Tonsättare (FST) (The Society of Swedish Composers). In 2005 he became an honorary member of the chamber music association Samtida Musik (Contemporary Music), founded 1960 and situated in Stockholm.

== Selected compositions ==
His oeuvre includes more than 200 compositions.

Orchestra

- Sinfonie-Carl Linnéus

Concert band

- Scherzo-Polka (symphonic brass band)
- Bad'ner-Kurpark-Tradition (spa orchestra / symphonic brass band)
- Bläser-Blues (marimba, brass band)

Concertante

- Concertino for mandolin and 10 instruments
- Montafoni (D-trumpet)
- Klingender Baum (Marimba)
- Concerto for flute and clarinet

Instrumental solos

- Brillante Figurationen for Solo Violin
- Ebbe und Flut for Viola Solo (1997)
- Fantasia "Les Pyrenées" for Viola or Cello Solo (1947)
- Farväl till en skogsvän (Farewell to a Forest Friend) for Viola or Cello Solo (1995)
- Hatten av för Dvořák (Hats Off to Dvořák) for Viola Solo (2002)
- Haltande mobil for Viola or Cello Solo, Percussion ad lib. (1987–1992)
- I gråmelerad skala (In Greymixed Scale) for Viola or Cello Solo (1999)
- Impromptu russo: Tonbroderi i "Vit natt" for Cello or Viola Solo (1981)
- Impulsi musicali, Suite for Viola Solo (1985)
- Kreuz und quer for Viola Solo (2003)
- Marsch Variante ohne Generalbass for Viola Solo (1989)
- Nio förvandlingar av ett skånskt tema (Nine Variations on a Scanian Theme) for Viola Solo (1992)
- Österut (Eastward) for Viola Solo (1998)
- Reminiszenz, 3 Movements for Viola Solo (or Cello Solo) (1996)
- Rester av en 12-tonsslinga (Traces of a 12-Tone Loop) for Viola Solo (1982)
- Så att säga (So to Speak) for Viola Solo (or Cello Solo) (1996)

Duos

- Bröllopsmarsch i sommartid (Wedding March in Summertime) for 2 Violas (or Violin and Viola), Double Bass ad lib. (1988)
- Collage de un vagabundo for 2 Violas (1985)
- Concerto-Gavotto per Otto (von Habsburg) for Violin and Viola (1984); dedicated to Otto von Habsburg
- Fem duetter i folkton (Scener från Adelsö) (Five Duets in Folktone: Scenes from Adelsö) for Violin and Viola (1989)
- Frühlings-Duett: Två damers blandade vårkänslor for Violin and Viola (or Cello) (1991)
- Fünf Wiener Hörbilder for Violin and Viola (1989)
- Kontamination, Duo Suite for Violin and Viola (1999)
- Med speleman i täten for Violin and Viola (1940/1995)
- Polacca Scaniensis, Duo in 3 Movements for Violin and Viola (1996)
- Skogshus, där fågeln har sitt näste (Forest Home: Where Birds Make Nest) for 2 Violas or Violin and Viola (1997)
- Slovakiskt capriccio (Slovak Capriccio) for Flute and Viola (1949–1952)
- Wärend-skutt for Violin and Viola (1996)

Trios, quartets and quintets

- Instrumental Ballad for violin, viola and guitar
- Quartetto-Capricionata (3 strings, guitar)
- Quintet for flute and strings

Vocal

- Song to a Lonely Flower by the Sea (flute, violin, viola, guitar)
