= Maledictus Eris =

Studio album by Svartsot
- Released: August 9th, 2011
- Recorded: Lübeck, Germany
- Genres: Folk metal, viking metal
- Length: 46:09
- Label: Napalm
- Producer: Lasse Lammert

Svartsot chronology
Mulmets Viser (2010)	Maledictus Eris (2011)

Maledictus Eris is the third album from the Danish folk metal band Svartsot.

== Track listing ==
1. "Staden..." – 0:48
2. "Gud giv det varer ved!" – 4:26
3. "Dødedansen" – 4:59
4. "Farsoten kom" – 4:32
5. "Holdt ned af en Tjørn" – 4:26
6. "Den forgængelige Tro" – 4:46
7. "Om jeg lever kveg" – 3:22
8. "Kunsten at dø" – 5:03
9. "Den nidske Gud" – 4:48
10. "Spigrene" – 4:13
11. "...Og Landet ligger så øde hen" – 4:46

== Credits ==
- Thor Bager – Vocals
- Cris J.S. Frederiksen – Guitars, Mandolin, Backing vocals
- James Atkin – Bass, Backing vocals
- Danni Lyse Jelsgaard – Drums
- Hans-Jørgen Martinus Hansen – Irish whistles, Swedish bagpipes, Backing vocals, and other instruments
- Lasse Lammert – Additional guitars
- Uffe Dons Petersen – Guest vocals
