= Svartsot =

Danish folk metal band

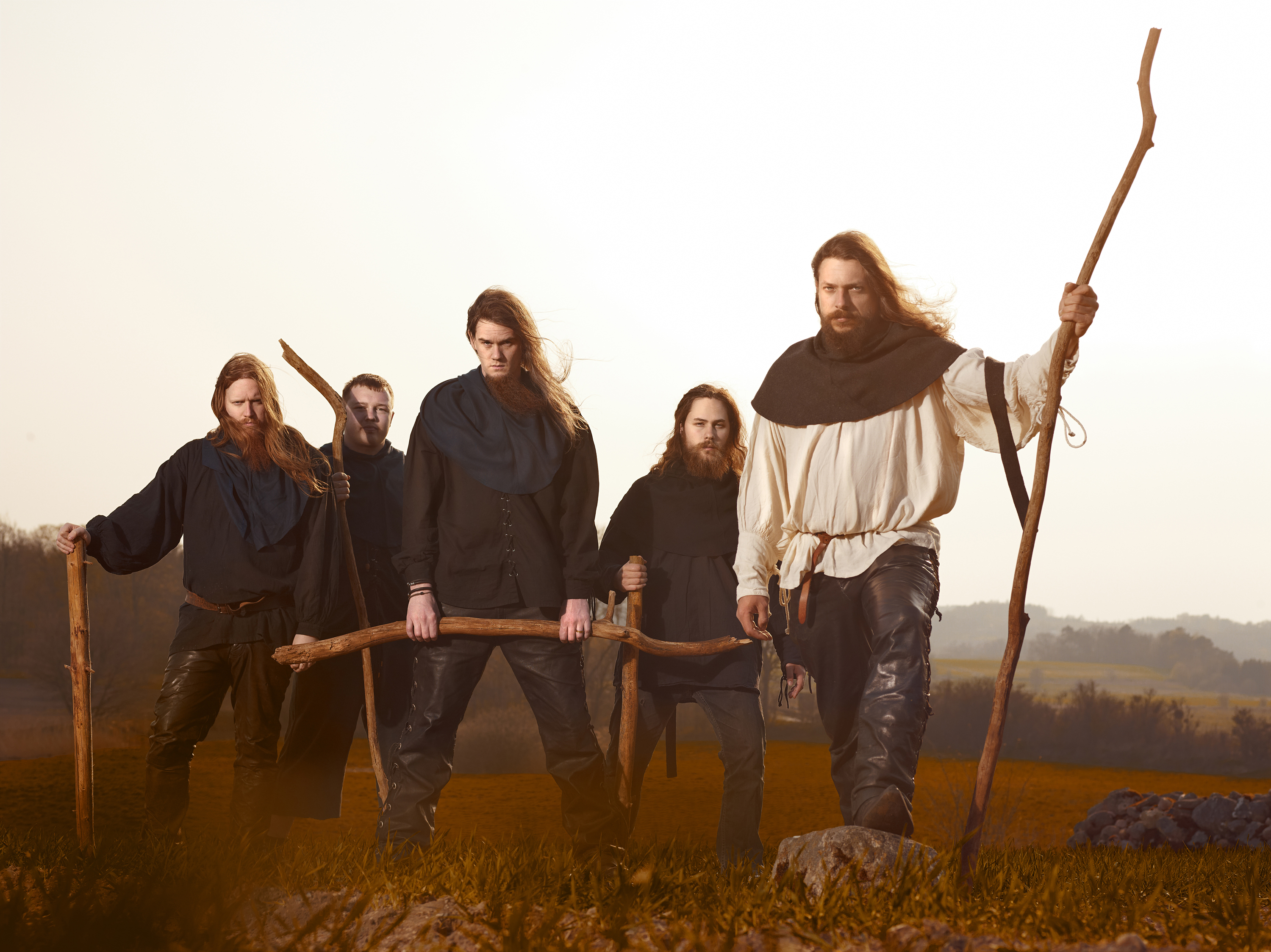

Background information
- Origin: Randers, Denmark
- Genres: Folk metal
- Years active: 2005 - present
- Label: Napalm Records
- Members: Cristoffer J.S. Frederiksen; Hans-Jørgen Martinus Hansen; Thor Bager; Rune Frisch; Michael Alm; Simon Buje
- Past members: James Atkin; Danni Jelsgaard; Cliff Nemanim; Michael Lundquist Andersen; Niels Thøgersen; Martin Kielland-Brandt; Claus B. Gnudtzmann; Stewart C. Lewis; Frederik Uglebjerg; Henrik S. Christensen; Marcelo Freitas
- Website: http://www.svartsot.dk/

Svartsot is a Danish folk metal band formed in 2005 in Randers.

== History ==
On 17 December 2008 Michael Lundquist Andersen, Niels Thøgersen, Claus B. Gnudtzmann and Martin Kielland-Brandt announced they had left the band because of different opinions on how to run a band and how the music should sound. The band's whistler, Stewart Lewis, is currently on a hiatus due to the continuing state of his wife’s ill health. On 22 February 2009 Svartsot announced their new band lineup was complete. Stewart Lewis was replaced for live shows, but was still considered a member of the band for some time.

In 2010, the band released a new album, Mulmets Viser, through Napalm Records. Despite Cristoffer J.S. Frederiksen being the only remaining member of the previous lineup, his position as the band's guitarist, composer and lyricist ensured that the band retained its musical identity. Mulmets Viser garnered a fairly positive critical response, although several critics pointed out that the band's strict adherence to their particular formula resulted in the album gradually losing listeners' attention as it progressed.

== Band members ==
=== Current ===
- Thor Bager - vocals
- Hans-Jørgen Martinus Vork Rosenwein - Irish whistles, mandolin, bagpipes and previously also accordion
- Cristoffer J.S. Frederiksen - lead guitar, mandolin, acoustic guitar
- Michael Alm - rhythm guitar
- Rune Frisch - drums
- Simon Buje - bass

=== Former ===
- James Atkin - bass
- Stewart C. Lewis - Irish whistles, bodhran, axes and other instruments
- Danni Jelsgaard - drums
- Michael Lundquist Andersen - guitar
- Niels Thøgersen - drums
- Claus B. Gnudtzmann - vocals
- Martin Kielland-Brandt - bass
- Cliff Nemanim - rhythm guitars
- Marcello Freitas - drums
- Henrik S. Christensen - bass
- Frederik Uglebjerg - drums

== Discography ==
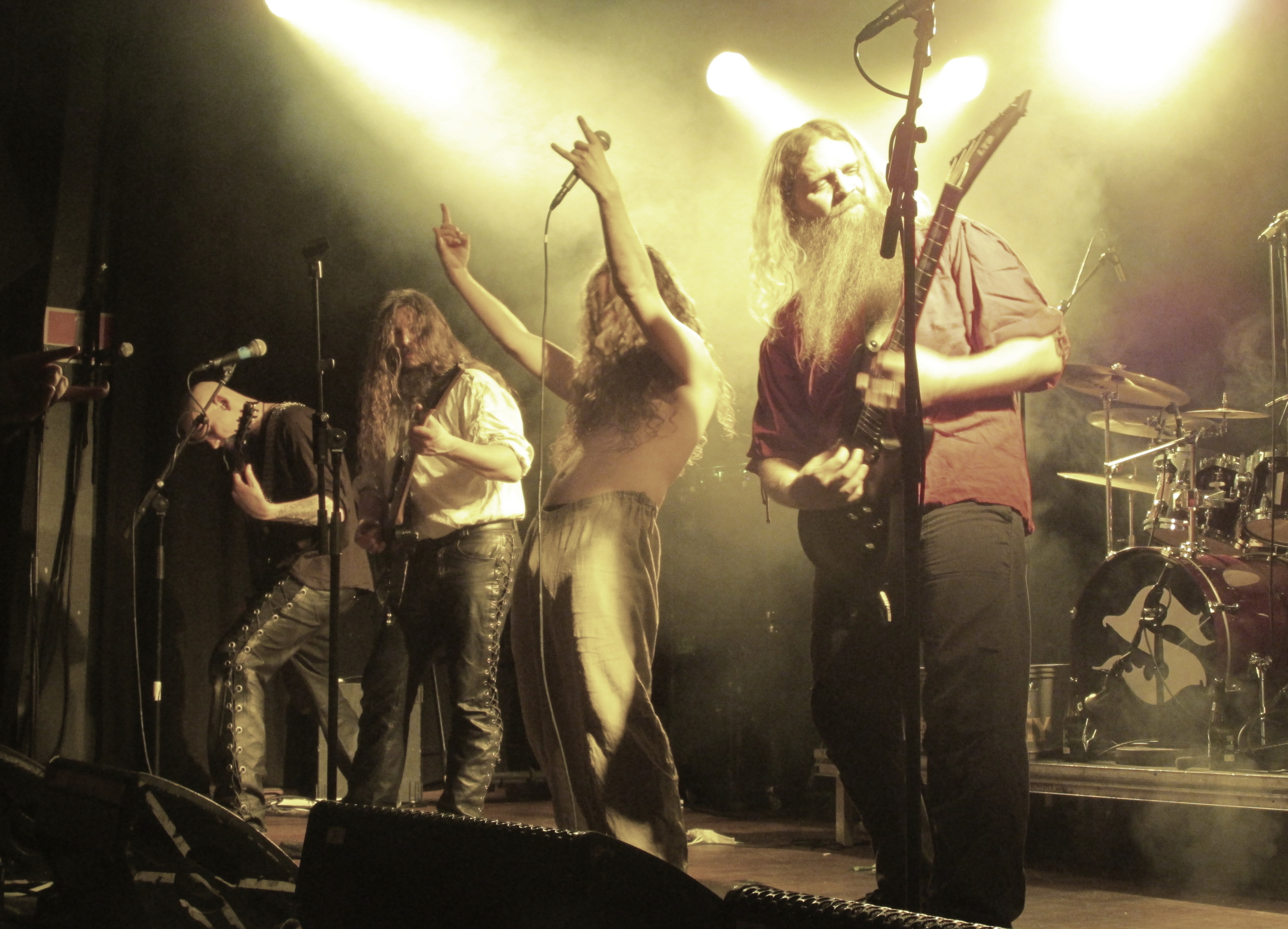
Concert in Aalborg, 2015

=== Studio albums ===
- Ravnenes Saga (2007)
- Mulmets Viser (2010)
- Maledictus Eris (2011)
- Vældet (2015)
- Kumbl (2022)
- Peregrinus (2025)

=== Demos ===
- Svundne Tider (2006)
- Tvende Ravne (2007)
