= Fête galante (Schierbeck) =

1930 Danish-language comic opera by Poul Schierbeck

Fête galante is a 1930 Danish-language comic opera by Poul Schierbeck to a libretto by Max Lobedanz. It was performed seven times at the Royal Theatre, Copenhagen, in 1931/32 with the composer's wife Sylvia Larsen in the main soprano role, but then not revived until 1960. It was played by Den Jyske Opera in February/March 2021.

== Roimbus ==
- Bo Skovhus, Denise Beck, Michael Weinius, Danish National Symphony Orchestra Michael Schønwandt DaCapo 2 SACD 2013
