= Tapani Valsta =

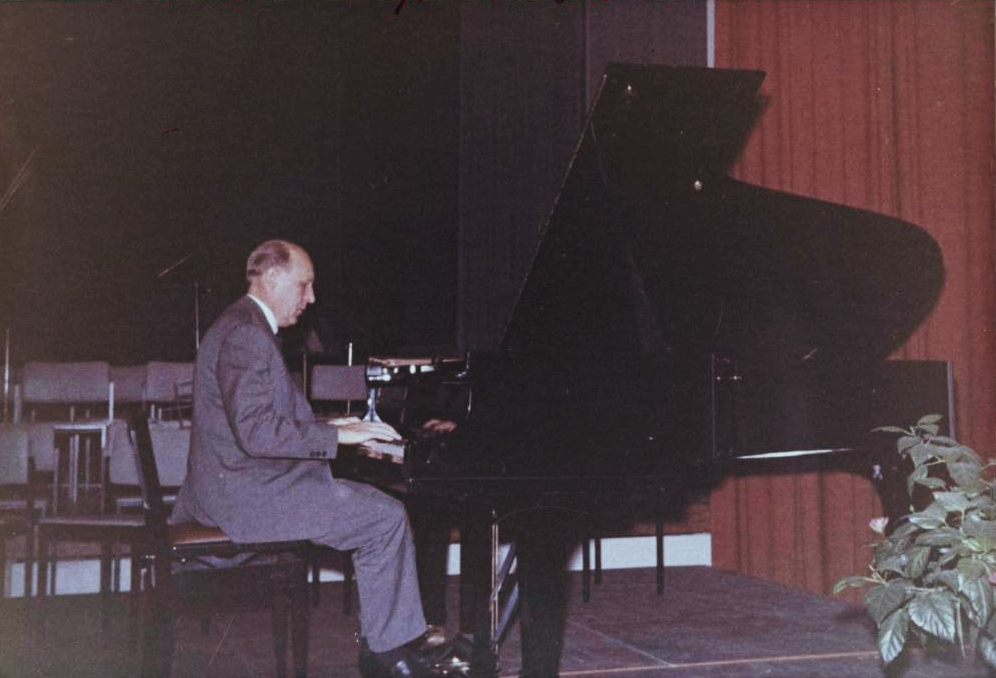
Tapani Valsta in concert, 1968.

Heikki Tapani Valsta (4 October 1921 in Ulvila – 21 April 2010 in Helsinki) was a Finnish pianist, organist and music educator.

Tapani Valsta studied music at the Sibelius Academy with Elis Mårtenson for organ (1946) and Ilmari Hannikainen for piano (1947). He made his concert debut in organ in 1946 and piano debut in 1948. In 1949 he won the Maj Lind Piano Competition. He worked with the Finnish Radio Symphony Orchestra from 1953 to 1959, and performed as a chamber musician and accompanist. In 1955 he took a position as church organist for the Lutheran Helsinki Cathedral. He also served as a teacher, lecturer and professor at the Sibelius Academy from 1959 to 1985.

His brother was cellist Esko Valsta.
