= Henriette Nissen-Saloman =

Swedish opera singer and teacher (1819–1879)

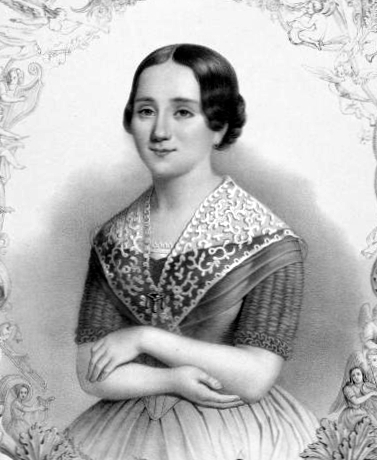
Henriette Nissen-Saloman

Henriette Nissen-Saloman (née Nissen; 18 January 1819 – 27 August 1879) was a Swedish opera singer (mezzo-soprano) and singing teacher.

== Life ==
Henriette Nissen-Saloman was born in Gothenburg and died in the German town of Bad Harzburg. She was a Swedish mezzo-soprano, singing teacher and creator of the important singing instruction book Škola pěnija. She was a contemporary of singer Jenny Lind and equally successful as her colleague, and alongside Lind who was called "the nightingale", Henriette Nissen received the nickname "the Swedish lark". In 1870 she became a member of the Royal Swedish Academy of Music.

Henriette Nissen's parents, wholesale merchant Jacob Simon Nissen and Sara Meyer, were of Jewish descent. Her childhood was coloured by the family's musical interests. The family's home became a focal point of their middle-class social circle within which there was often music making. Henriette Nissen exhibited musical talent at an early age and received her first singing lesson from the organist in the German Church in Gothenburg (also called Christinae Church), Georg Günther. At age 13 she garnered attention when she sang one of Donna Anna's arias from Mozart's Don Giovanni at a soirée. Her parents were eventually convinced by, among others, the Danish ballet master August Bournonville to allow their daughter to continue her music education. Between 1839 and 1843, Henriette Nissen was educated in Paris by Manuel García in singing, and by Frédéric Chopin in piano.

In 1843 Henriette Nissen debuted at the Théâtre Italien in Paris in the role of Adalgisa in Bellini's Norma. Her second debut as Donna Elvira in Mozart's Don Giovanni was a huge success that resulted in her signing a three-year contract. Soon thereafter and with very short notice, she replaced an indisposed singer and debuted as Rosina in Rossinis's The Barber of Seville. This quick response confirmed her breakthrough. That same year, Henriette Nissen toured Sweden and performed a concert with Jenny Lind who had yet to make her international breakthrough. The concert was a success and the newspaper Freja posed the question who was best, the internationally known Henriette Nissen, or the, as yet, little-known Swedish singer Jenny Lind.

In 1845 Henriette Nissen left Paris. She then began touring Europe, which lasted until 1859, traveling to Italy, Russia, England, and Germany and around Scandinavia. She sang on several prestigious stages including Covent Garden in London and the Imperial Ballet and Opera Theatre (also called the Mariinsky Theatre) in Saint Petersburg. She had roles in Donizetti's Anna Bolena and Lucia di Lammermoor, female leads in Bellini's I Puritani, Norma, La Sonnambula, Meyerbeer's Robert le diable (Robert the Devil), Rossini's Le siège de Corinthe (The Siege of Corinth) and the above named The Barber of Seville. Both Rossini and Donizetti responded very positively to Nissen. In Berlin the critic Ernst Kossak wrote that "If Jenny Lind is the nightingale, then Henriette Nissen is the lark".

Henriette Nissen took part in several of the yearly Gewandhaus concerts in Leipzig, singing, among others, Handel, Bach, Mozart and Spohr. In Leipzig she met the Danish violinist and composer Siegfried Saloman (1816−1899). They married in 1850 and thereafter Henriette Nissen gave up her opera career, while still continuing as a concert singer.

Between 1859 and 1874, Nissen-Saloman worked mainly as a singing teacher at the conservatory in Saint Petersburg, where she worked from the time of the conservatory's opening. She became very popular and was made honorary member in several of the city's musical societies. Among her students were Alma Fohström (1856−1936), Ida Basilier-Magelssen (1846−1928), Anna de Belocca (1854−?) and Joséphine de Reszke (1855−1891), all of whom would later become well known.

In 1870 Henriette Nissen-Saloman became a member of the Kungliga Musikaliska akademien (the Royal Swedish Academy of Music). After ending her work as a singing teacher, she focused her attention on her book of vocal instruction, which she never saw published. In combination with a head cold, she died suddenly in the German town of Bad Harzburg. She was buried in the family grave in Gothenburg.

Henriette Nissen-Saloman is remembered by posterity mainly as a singing teacher. Her very solid works, Škola pěnija, L'étude du chant and Das Studium des Gesanges (1880), were given out posthumously, made print-ready by her husband in three languages. During 1884, the Svensk musiktidning (Swedish music journal) published parts of her writings in a Swedish translation as a series that stretched out over a whole year. Henriette Nissen-Saloman had a powerfully sounding mezzo-soprano voice in the lower registers, while the higher notes were thin with less colour. She easily sang with coloratura and embellishments. "Nissen is a master of fioritura, and flourishes and everything that it is called" wrote a journalist in Freja in 1843.

This was evident as well in her vocal instruction book, and also shows that she had the fantasy and ability to adapt her exercises to each student. Her lessons were rich in variation and it is thought that she modelled them after García's lessons; however, Nissen-Saloman gave many more variations in her exercises. The work begins with an extensive explanation of how the voice functions and how singing should be studied. The 405-page-long section about vocalisation is very detailed and left nothing to fate. In the final section she shows variations and ornamentations for the roles in opera scenes from Norma, Rosina, Amina, Cinderella and Lucia.
