= Rockland the Opera =

Historically-based tragic opera

Rockland the Opera, commissioned by the Pine Mountain Music Festival (PMMF), is a historically based tragic opera in 14 scenes composed and written by Jukka Linkola of Nivala, Finland, first performed in 2011. It is based on a long-forgotten miners' strike at the town of Rockland in Upper Peninsula of Michigan's Ontonagon County. Striking Finnish miners were confronted by sheriff's deputies and two miners were shot and killed.

One of the miners, Alfred Laakso wrote an account of the events. Years later his grandson Andy Hill read the account and thought it make for a good piece of musical theater. This he discussed with John Kiltinen who believed it could be turned into an opera. Kiltinen then brought idea to the PMMF Board who liked it. John Kiltinen, his wife Pauline and Dr. Gloria Jackson raised the money necessary to commission the opera. It was completed in mid-2009.

== The logo ==

The Rockland logo contains three design elements that symbolize the storyline:

The Pick – A representation of the protagonists' profession as well as the frontier life they endured in the western Upper Peninsula (U.P.) of Michigan.

The Rose – The opera contains a love story.

The Thorns – Life in the early 1900s U.P. could be harsh and trials could arise.

== Performance history ==
The first production of Rockland was in Nivala, Finland on 9 June 2011 at the Nivala Ice Arena under the direction of Jussi Tapola with Timo Hannula conducting. It received generally positive reviews from audience members even though it did not draw as many spectators as the River Valleys Music Foundation of Nivala had hoped.

Its premiere in the New World was in Houghton, Michigan, United States on 15 and 17 July 2011 at the Rozsa Center For The Performing Arts as part of the Pine Mountain Music Festival. The premiere was under the direction of Jussi Tapola with Craig Randal Johnson conducting.

To promote the opera in the Upper Peninsula of Michigan, the PMMF collaborated with community artist Mary Wright on The Story Line Project. People in the community (mostly schoolchildren) were invited to write a one-page story about an ancestor who overcame hardship like the people in the opera. These stories were then transferred to dishtowel-sized pieces of fabric and hung from clotheslines to honor their ancestors and make them aware of the history on which their lives are built.

== Roles ==
Role	Premiere Cast, 9 June 2011 (Conductor: Timo Hannula)
Alfred Laakso, miner and musician	Esa Ruuttunen
Johanna Ahopelto	Tiina Vahevaara
Pekka Ahopelto (Puna-Pekka)	Riku Pelo
William Jackson, foreman	William Joyner
Matti Kivi, miner.	Lassi Virtanen
Hilja, daughter of Heikki Järvenpää	Riika Pelo
Pastor Erkki Rantanen	Petri Pussila
Rauha	Katriina Leppänen
Otto, Rauha's father	Ari Hosio
John or Jussi	Simo Mäkinen
Sven Polkki, union organizer	Mikko Himanka
Thomas Colton, Director of Mining	Robert Mcloud
Heikki Järvenpää, miner	Tom Häkkilä
Pete Casavino	Ilkka Hämäläinen

== Synopsis ==
In about 1960, the elderly Alfred Laakso leads a bus tour of tourists to the town of Rockland, where he lived in 1906. It is almost a ghost town, but he tells them about when it was a booming place. The action reverts to 1906.

Scene 1
A Fourth of July party at the temperance hall. Johanna and her husband, Puna-Pekka (Red Pete) are there. Pastor Rantanen introduces a union organizer whose speech mixes patriotism with a call for a strike.
Scene 2
Accident in the mine. Otto is killed and Alfred is injured. Otto's new widow, Rauha, grieves.
Scene 3
Miner Puna-Pekka agonizes about whether he should have spoken up about safety lapses. He flirts with getting drunk, but his wife, Johanna, has hidden the bottles. He swears off drinking.
Scene 4
Otto's funeral. Pastor Rantanen suggests a ruse whereby the widow Rauha and her children can stay in their home.
Scene 5
In the tavern, miners talk about the strike. Breaking the tension, barber Pete Casavino sings "I'm my own barber."
Scene 6
Johanna visited by William Jackson, underground foreman, who tells her she deserves better than Puna-Pekka.
Scene 7
In church, as strike date nears.
Scene 8
In mine office the night before the strike. Mine superintendent Thomas Morton maneuvers William Jackson to name strike leaders.
Scene 9
At home, Puna-Pekka tells Johanna he must participate in the strike for the sake of the children.
Scene 10
The strike. Miners confront sheriff's deputies. Chaos, shouting and gunfire; Pune-Pekka killed on the spot, Kova Kivi dies later.
Scene 11
Crowd of miners in jail. Most are released on bail, but 12 are charged.
Scene 12
The trial. The elderly Alfred Laakso continues his tale, describing how two of the miners were tried and acquitted, and the rest were freed.
Scene 13
William meets Johanna for last time; Johanna returning to Finland, while William hopes for relationship.
Scene 14
Finale. Back in 1960, and Alfred Laakso concludes the story.
