= Ritsch, ratsch, filibom =

Ritsch, ratsch, filibom is a Swedish song and singing game, used when dancing around the Christmas tree and the Midsummer pole. The song was published in the second edition of Sånglekar från Nääs , which was published in 1915.

== Recordings ==
An early recording was done by Konsertorkestern in Stockholm on 27 May 1925.
