= Reine Colaço Osorio-Swaab =

Dutch composer (1881–1971)

Reine Colaço Osorio-Swaab (16 January 1881 – 14 April 1971) was a Dutch composer.

Osorio-Swaab was born in Amsterdam, Netherlands to a wealthy and devout Jewish family. Jewish observances were strictly followed in the household and young Reine was, in her own words, very devout. She developed an interest in composing music after her children were grown and her husband had died, and studied with Ernest W. Mulder for composition and Henk Badings for melody. In the 1930s she wrote a number of songs with Dutch text, and after World War II she composed Monument in 1946 in honor of her son John who was murdered in Dachau. In the 1920s she translated the work of Martin Buber into Dutch. She died in Amsterdam.

== Works ==
Colaço Osorio-Swaab composed chamber works, songs, overture for orchestra, duets and declamatoria. Among theses:

- Aus den knospen quellen sachte (in Sänge eines fahrenden Spielmanns) (Text: Stefan George)
- Avond (Text: Carel Steven Adama van Scheltema)
- Das Roseninnere (Text: Rainer Maria Rilke)
- Dorpsdans (Text: Jacques Fabrice Herman Perk)
- En sourdine (Text: Paul Verlaine)
- Fêtes galantes (Text: Paul Verlaine)
- Heisst es viel dich bitten (from Sänge eines fahrenden Spielmanns) (Text: Stefan George)
- So ich traurig bin (from Sänge eines fahrenden Spielmanns) (Text: Stefan George)
- Worte trügen, worte fliehen (from Sänge eines fahrenden Spielmanns) (Text: Stefan George)
- Zij komt (Text: Jacques Fabrice Herman Perk)
- Suite (Trio No. 1) for flute, violin and viola (1940)
- Trio No. 3 for 2 violins and viola (1950)
- Quartet No. 1 for flute, violin, viola and cello (1952)
- Sonata No.3 for viola and piano (1952)
- Tsaddiék, Intermezzo for viola and piano (1953)
