= Wolf (band) =

Swedish heavy metal band

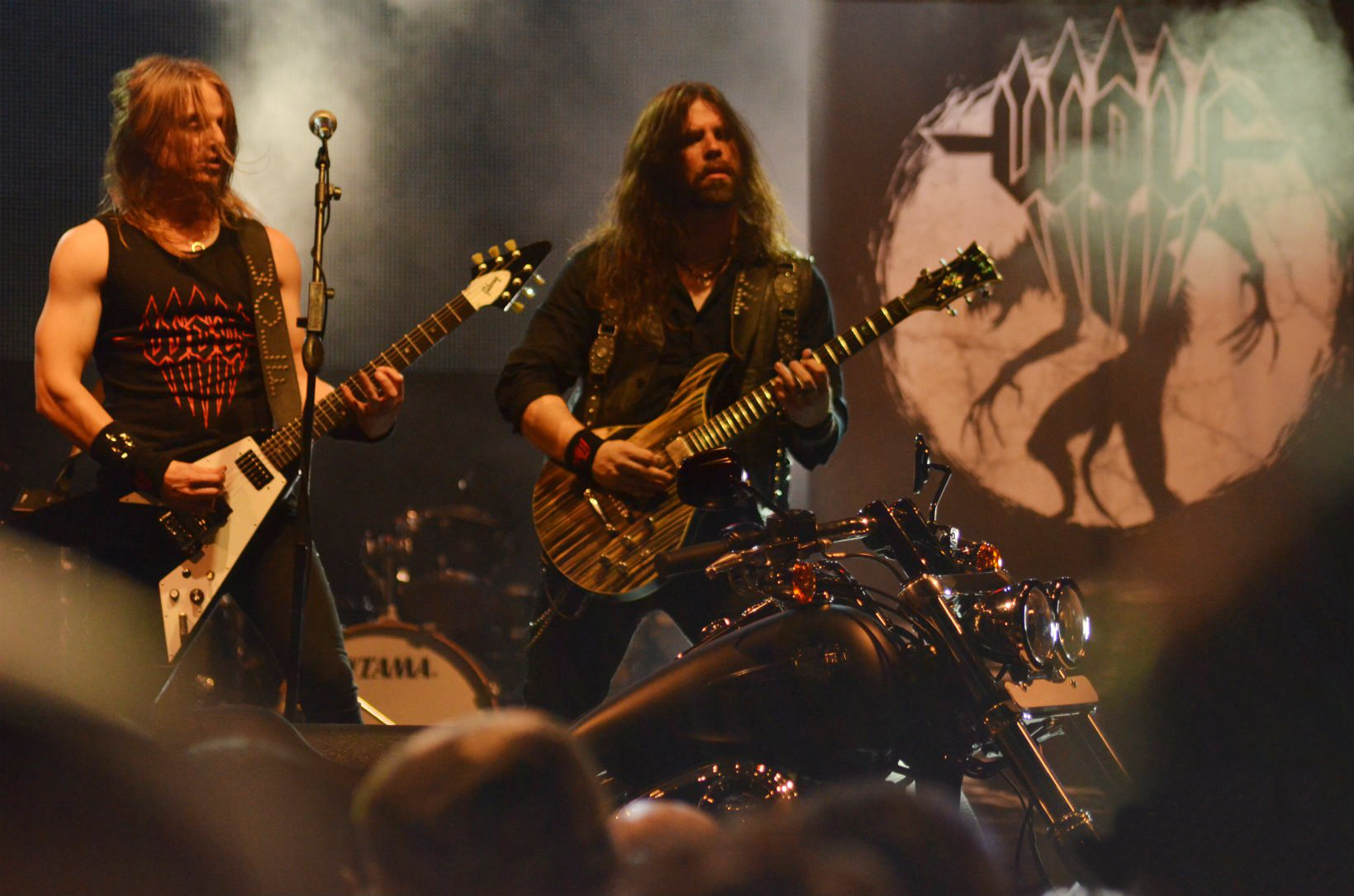
- Wolf at Harley Rock Riders in India in 2012

Background information
- Origin: Örebro, Sweden
- Genres: Heavy metal, speed metal, power metal
- Years active: 1995–present
- Labels: No Fashion; Century Media (Europe); Prosthetic Records (North America)
- Members: Niklas Stålvind; Simon Johansson; Pontus Egberg; Johan Koleberg
- Past members: Henrik Johansson; Johan Bülow; Daniel Bergkvist; Mikael Goding; Tobias Kellgren; Johannes Losbäck
- Website: wolf.nu

Wolf is a Swedish heavy metal band from Örebro, not identical to the band Wolf from the United Kingdom. Formed in 1995, the band has since released nine studio albums and toured with Saxon, Evile, Tankard and more recently, Trivium.

== History ==
Formed in 1995, the band has since released nine studio albums and have toured with renowned heavy metal bands Saxon, Evile and more recently, Trivium. In support of their seventh studio album Devil Seed, released in August 2014, they toured the UK with Primitai in early February 2015. Wolf once again teamed up with Primitai in 2019 to tour the UK before the release of their eighth studio album Feeding The Machine (2020).

On 22 December 2021 the band revealed the title and artwork for their ninth studio album, Shadowland, which was subsequently released on 1 April 2022.

== Members ==
=== Current members ===
- Niklas Stålvind – vocals, guitar, bagpipes (1995–present)
- Simon Johansson – guitar (2011–present)
- Pontus Egberg – bass (2019–present)
- Johan Koleberg – drums (2019–present)

=== Former members ===
- Henrik Johansson – guitar (1999–2000; died 2006)
- Johan Bülow – guitar (2000–2002)
- Daniel Bergkvist – drums (1995–2005)
- Mikael Goding – bass (1995–2007)
- Tobias Kellgren – drums (2005–2008)
- Johannes Losbäck – guitar, backing vocals (2002–2011)
- Anders Modd – bass (2007–2019)
- Richard Holmgren – drums (2008–2019)

== Discography ==
=== Studio albums ===
- Wolf (2000)
- Black Wings (2002)
- Evil Star (2004)
- The Black Flame (2006)
- Ravenous (2009)
- Legions of Bastards (2011)
- Devil Seed (2014)
- Feeding the Machine (2020)
- Shadowland (2022)
- Hour of the Wolf (2026)

=== Other releases ===
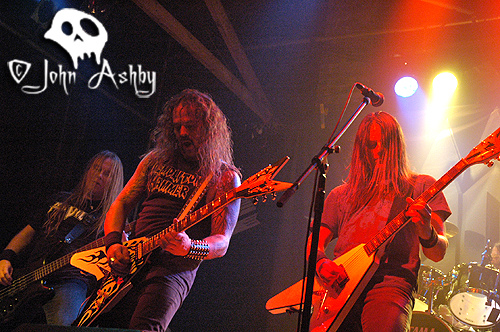
Wolf UK tour 2009

- Demo I [Demo] (1995)
- Demo II [Demo] (1996)
- Demo 98 [Demo] (1998)
- In The Shadow of Steel [Single] (1999)
- The Howling Scares Me to Death [Single] (1999)
- Moonlight [CD, EP] (2001)
- A World Bewitched [CD, Single, Promo] (2002)
- Nightstalker [7", Single] (2002)
- Wolf's Blood [CD, Single] (2004)
