= Thorvald Hansen (composer) =

Danish trumpeter and composer

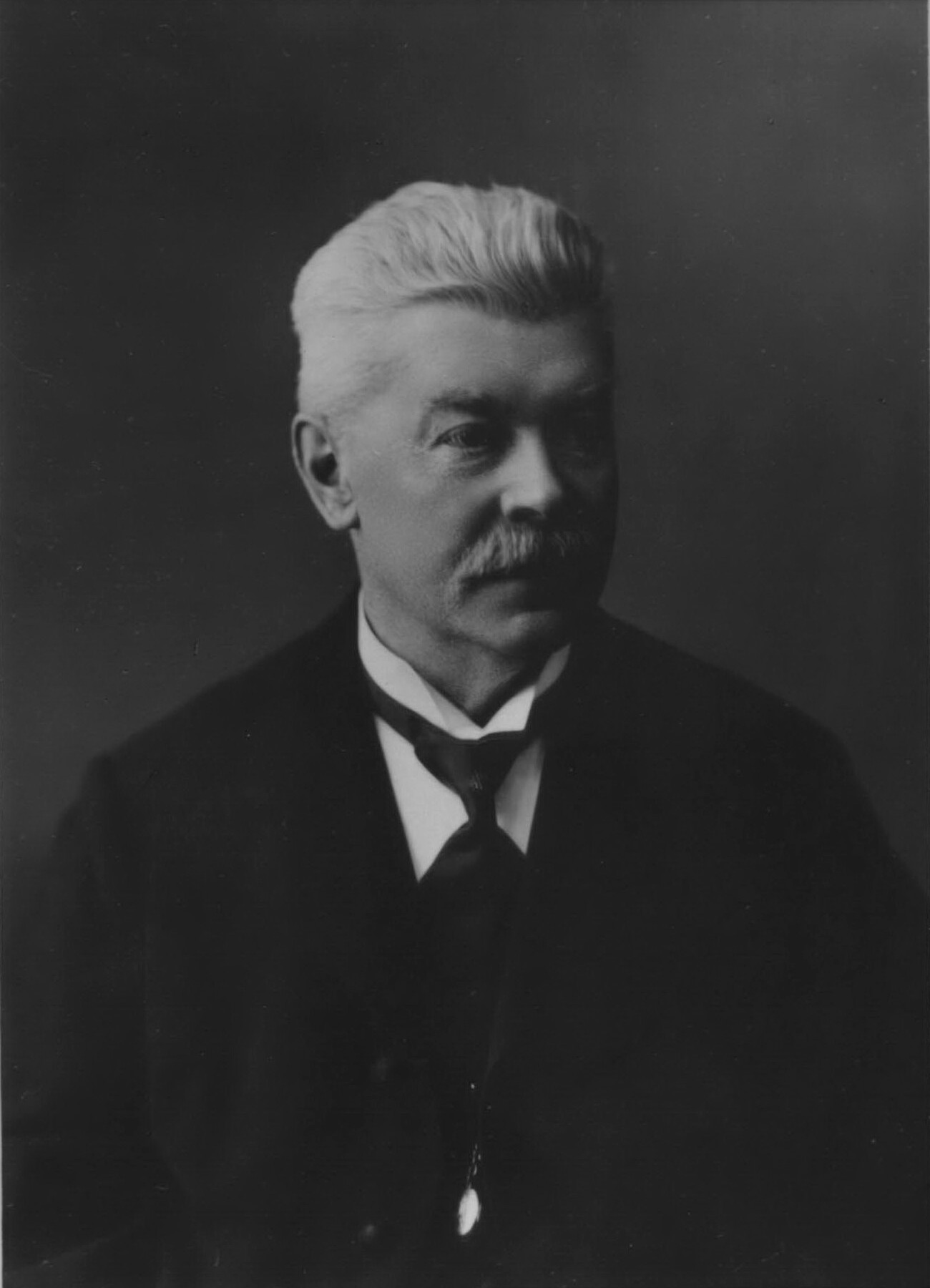
Frederick Thorvald Hansen

Frederick Thorvald Hansen (3 May 1847 - 24 January 1915) was a Danish trumpeter and composer. As a boy, he learned to play the piano, organ, violin, and later trumpet: with Peter Johan Waldemar Petersen, Danish trumpeter (1824-1901)². In 1867, Hansen joined the Tivoli Concert hall Orchestra and in 1884 he was hired as a solo trumpeter in the Royal Danish Orchestra. At the same time, he played viola and violin in various chamber ensembles. Hansen was for many years organist substitute for cathedral organist J. P. E. Hartmann in the Church of Our Lady. He also composed and has written a number of smaller pieces for piano and trumpet, but also other things such some Progressive End Exercises for Trumpet in F. In 1893 he joined the Royal Danish Academy of Music to teach trumpet there.

== Compositions ==
- Sonata for cornet and piano in E Flat Major, op. 18 (1915)
- Cantata for the Naval School 200 Annual Fest (1901)
- Vaisenhus-Cantata (1902)
- Quartet for 2 cornets and trombones 2 (1904)
- Suite for orchestra
- Chanson du soir for string orchestra and harp
- Romance with string orchestra and 2 horns
- Serenade for oboe
- Serenade for French horn
- Concert Waltz for Cornet and piano
- Romance for Cornet and piano
- Scherzo for viola and piano
- Concert Wire
- "From Gyldenløve" for voice and piano
