= Symphony No. 2 (Rautavaara) =

Musical composition by Einojuhani Rautavaara

- Sinfonia intima
- by Einojuhani Rautavaara
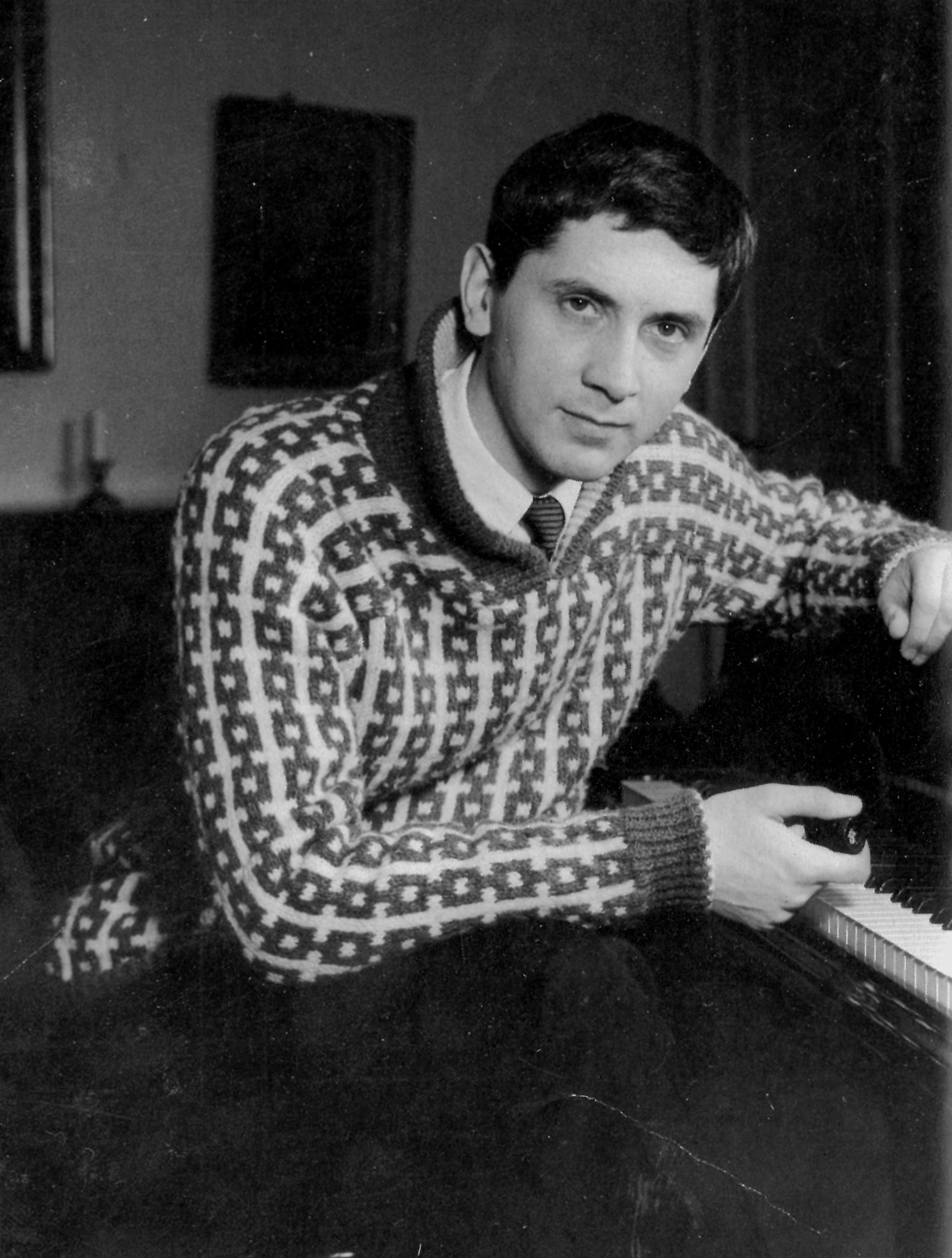
- Rautavaara in the 1950s
- Opus: 8
- Period: Contemporary music
- Related: 7 Preludes for piano (1956)
- Composed: 1957 (rev. 1984)
- Publisher: Fennica Gehrman
- Duration: 22 minutes
- Movements: 4

Premiere
- Date: October 11, 1957
- Location: Helsinki
- Conductor: Tauno Hannikainen
- Performers: Helsinki Philharmonic Orchestra

Einojuhani Rautavaara's Symphony No. 2, Op. 8, originally entitled Sinfonia intima, is a symphony for orchestra written in 1957. It marks the composer's departure from his neoclassical first symphony towards atonality.

== Background ==
Rautavaara's second symphony is largely derived from material from the composer's 7 Preludes for Piano, which was completed in 1956. According to Rautavaara's writings, the preludes, later rearranged as symphonic movements, are "bare, sketchy, aphoristic, unconventional, ascetic, and dissonant but still supported with tonality." These preludes were expanded and further developed to accommodate the full instrumental range of the orchestra and would also later be rearranged again in another Rautavaara composition for string orchestra: Finnisch, heute (1970).

The composition process began in the fall of 1956, after completing his composition diploma at the Sibelius Academy and scheduling a performance of his Symphony No. 1 for January 1957. After receiving mixed reviews for that performance and concerned about being perceived as conservative, Rautavaara decided to showcase his skills as a contemporary composer writing a symphony full of chromaticism, in expressionistic contrast to the first. The seven preludes were expanded to double their duration in the new four-movement symphony. According to the composer, the symphony should not be considered "new wine in old wineskins." It would later become common for Rautavaara to reuse his own material in different works, as he did with his sixth symphony, which took material from his opera Vincent. This was one of the precursors of his forthcoming avant-garde period, after he had undergone a stylistic crisis following his years of study in New York.

The piece was finished in 1957 in Helsinki and was published later by Fennica Gehrman. The premiere took place in Helsinki on October 11, 1957. The Helsinki Philharmonic Orchestra with conductor Tauno Hannikainen premiered the symphony on that occasion. In 1984, Rautavaara expanded the scoring to accommodate a larger number of musicians, as the original was scored for a relatively small orchestra. In his 1984 revision, the composer did not add any new fragments, but developed existing textures further by adding more instruments. The revised version was premiered by the Sibelius Academy Orchestra with conductor Jorma Panula. The premiere on this occasion took place in Espoo on February 15, 1985.

== Structure ==
The symphony is cast into four movements that do not follow the traditional structure of a symphony, as they are an expansion upon a previous work for piano and, thus, it is not based on thematic development. It has an approximate duration of 22 minutes and is scored for a relatively small orchestra, which is what has led Rautavaara to consider it a chamber symphony, even though the 1984 revision calls for larger forces. The movement list is as follows:

1. Quasi grave
2. Vivace
3. Largo
4. Presto

The 1984 revision, which is most commonly performed today, calls for two flutes (second flute doubling piccolo), two oboes (second oboe doubling English horn), three clarinets (in E♭, A, and B♭ — third clarinet doubling bass clarinet), two bassoons (second basson doubling contrabassoon), two French horns in F, one trumpet in C, a standard string section, and a somewhat large percussion section for three percussionists, which consists of a marimba, a vibraphone, a xylophone, a glockenspiel, a military drum, a whip, a bass drum, clash cymbals, a tam-tam, tom-toms, a guiro, and three side drums.

Melodies and harmonies feature minor ninths, perfect fifths, and tritones extensively. The symphony starts out with a slow, funereal movement that's opened by a theme played by the lower strings, which is then followed by the woodwinds and, later, the horns. It progresses from an initially somber to a brighter movement, with insistent pulsations reinforced by the vibraphone. The second movement is very fast and intense, with fragmented and complex rhythms. It is followed by a slow movement that begins with a timpani roll and the bass clarinet. Here, the string play only one note that later expands to a motive with wide intervals. The movement ends with the eerie sound of the low winds. Finally, the last movement is, again, characterized by jagged rhythms that are supported by drumbeats. It closes the symphony abruptly.

In Rautavaara's opinion, the symphony follows a typical symphonic structure: the first movement follows the sonata form, the second is a scherzo, the third is a slow movement, and the fourth works as a finale. He also believes the symphony has "määrätty väkivaltaisuus" (a certain aggressiveness), and associates its violence to the intimateness that is implied in the title. According to the composer, the symphony is "intimate" insofar as it is scored for a relatively small orchestra, but also because it is very expressive in nature, always avoiding the characteristics of expressionist music from the 20s. Rautavaara has referred to this style as "ekspressiivistä formalismia" (expressive formalism).

== Reception ==
Even though information about the premiere is rare, the symphony is regarded generally favorably by critics. Musicologist Kimmo Korhonen states that it is an intermediate stage between Rautavaara's neoclassicism and his twelve-tone works of the 1960s. The slow third movement has been compared to Bartók's night music, whereas the second and the fourth movements have been compared to Stravinsky's Rite of Spring.

== Recordings ==
The following is a list of recordings of Rautavaara's Symphony No. 2

Recordings of Rautavaara's second symphony
Orchestra	Conductor	Date of recording	Place of recording	Label	Release date	Format	Notes
MDR Leipzig Radio Symphony Orchestra	Max Pommer	June 1989	Bethanienkirche, Leipzig	Ondine	1990	CD	(Note: Authoritative, recorded in the presence of the composer.)
Tapiola Sinfonietta	Jean-Jacques Kantorow	November 1997	Tapiola Concert Hall, Helsinki	BIS Records	1998	CD	
