= Legions of Bastards =

Studio album by Wolf
- Released: April 2011
- Recorded: 2010
- Genres: Heavy metal, power metal
- Length: 52:31
- Label: Century Media
- Producer: Pelle Saether

Wolf chronology
Ravenous (2009)	Legions of Bastards (2011)	Devil Seed (2014)

Legions of Bastards is the sixth full studio album by Swedish heavy metal band Wolf, which was released in April 2011 via Century Media Records. It was the band's last album featuring guitarist Johannes Axeman Losbäck, who was replaced by Simon Johansson.

== Track listing ==
No.	Title	Length
1.	"Vicious Companions"	03:41
2.	"Skull Crusher"	03:47
3.	"Full Moon Possession"	04:26
4.	"Jekyll & Hyde"	05:39
5.	"Absinthe"	04:44
6.	"Tales from the Crypt"	05:55
7.	"Nocturnal Rites"	05:30
8.	"Road to Hell"	04:15
9.	"False Preacher"	03:57
10.	"Hope to Die"	04:34
11.	"K-141 Kursk"	06:03
Total length:		52:31

== Personnel ==
Band

- Niklas Stålvind – vocals, guitar
- Johannes Axeman Losbäck – guitar
- Anders G Modd – bass guitar
- Richard A Holmgren – drums

Production

- Produced by Pelle Saether
- Artwork by Thomas Holm
