= 1879 in music =

This article is about music-related events in 1879.

== Specific locations ==
- 1879 in Norwegian music

== Events ==
- January 1 – The Violin Concerto of Johannes Brahms is premiered in Leipzig. Joseph Joachim was the soloist with Brahms conducting.
- December 31 – Gilbert and Sullivan's comic opera The Pirates of Penzance opens at the Fifth Avenue Theatre in New York City (following a token performance the day before for U.K. copyright reasons in Paignton, Devon).
- Engelbert Humperdinck becomes the first winner of the Mendelssohn Award awarded by the Mendelssohn Stiftung (foundation) of Berlin.
- The Monte Carlo Philharmonic Orchestra gains a permanent home at the Garnier Palace.

== Published popular music ==
- "Oh, Dem Golden Slippers" by James A. Bland
- "In the Morning By the Bright Light" by James A. Bland
- "My Visit to the Opera" by Joseph P. Skelly
- "Some Day I'll Wander Back Again", words by Arthur W. French, music by William A. Huntley

== Classical music ==
- Henri Duparc – Le Manoir de Rosemonde
- Gabriel Fauré – Berceuse, for violin and piano
- César Franck – Piano Quintet
- Carl Goldmark
  - Penthesilea, Op.31
  - Piano Trio No.2, Op.33
- Asger Hamerik – Concert Romance for Cello and Piano
- Stephen Heller
  - 4 Mazurkas, Op.148
  - 20 Preludes, Op.150
- Hans Huber
  - 10 Ländler vom Luzerner See, Op.47
  - Eine Lustspiel-Ouverture, Op.50
- Franz Lachner – Elegie for Flute and Organ
- Max Meyer-Olbersleben – Ballade, Op.9
- Pablo de Sarasate – Spanish Dances for violin and piano, Book II
- Bedřich Smetana – Ten Czech Dances, for piano
- Peter Tchaikovsky - Orchestral Suite No. 1
- Charles-Marie Widor – Symphony for Organ No. 5

== Opera ==
- Giovanni Bottesini – Ero e Leandro
- Emmanuel Chabrier – Une éducation manquée, premiered May 1 in Paris
- Miguel Marqués – Camoens
- Viktor Nessler – Der Rattenfänger von Hameln
- Camille Saint-Saëns – Étienne Marcel
- Peter Tchaikovsky – Eugene Onegin

== Musical theater ==
- The Mulligan Guards' Ball Broadway production opens at the Comique Theatre on January 13 and runs for 153 performances
- The Mulligan Guards' Chowder Broadway production opens at the Comique Theatre on August 11 and runs for 112 performances
- The Mulligan Guards' Christmas Broadway production opens at the Comique Theatre on November 17 and runs for 104 performances

== Births ==
- January 3 – Lina Abarbanell, German-American soprano (d. 1963)
- January 10 – Armanda Degli Abbati, Italian opera singer (d. 1946)
- January 26 – Hugo Riesenfeld, film music composer (died 1939)
- February 9 – Natanael Berg, Swedish composer (d. 1957)
- February 26 – Frank Bridge, composer (d. 1941)
- April 1 – Louise Gunning, Broadway and vaudeville singer (d. 1960)
- May 22
  - Jean Cras, French composer (d. 1932)
  - Eastwood Lane, composer (d. 1951)
- June 13 – Maria Gay, opera singer (d. 1943)
- June 21 – Henry Creamer, US songwriter (d. 1930)
- July 5
  - Philippe Gaubert, composer (d. 1941)
  - Wanda Landowska, harpsichordist (d. 1959)
- July 9 – Ottorino Respighi, composer (d. 1936)
- August 1 – Eva Tanguay, singer, vaudeville star (d. 1947)
- August 18 – Gus Edwards, Prussian-born US songwriter and entertainer (d. 1945)
- August 31 – Alma Mahler, born Alma Schindler, Viennese-born composer and wife of Gustav Mahler (d. 1964)
- September 29 – Willem Willeke, Dutch cellist and music editor (died 1950)
- September 30 – Henri Casadesus, violist and music publisher (d. 1947)
- October 12 – Chris Smith, composer (d. 1949)
- October 13 – Leopold Weninger, composer (died 1940)
- October 18 – Grzegorz Fitelberg, Polish conductor, violinist and composer (d. 1953)
- October 21 – Joseph Canteloube, composer (d. 1957)
- November 2 – Ramón Montoya, Spanish flamenco guitarist (d. 1949)
- December 1 – Beth Slater Whitson, US lyric writer (d. 1930)
- December 4 – Hamilton Harty, composer (d. 1941)
- December 7 – Rudolf Friml, pianist and composer of operettas and musicals (d. 1972)
- December 19 – Otto Olsson, Swedish composer (d. 1964)
- December 26 – Julius Weismann, German conductor and composer (d. 1950)

== Deaths ==
- January 8 – Ferdo Livadić, composer (born 1799)
- February 20 – John Orlando Parry, pianist, singer and comedian (born 1810)
- April 9 – Ernst Friedrich Eduard Richter, music theorist
- May 27 – E. S. Engelsberg, composer
- June 3 – Frances Ridley Havergal, hymn-writer
- July 6 – Henry Smart, organist and composer (born 1813)
- August 4 – Adelaide Kemble, opera singer
- September 12 – Peter Arnold Heise, composer
- October 14 – Karl Anton Eckert, conductor and composer (born 1820)
- November 30 – August Bournonville, Danish ballet-master and choreographer (born 1805)
- December 24 – Anna Bochkoltz, German operatic soprano, voice teacher and composer (born 1815)
