= Per Reidarson =

Norwegian composer and music critic

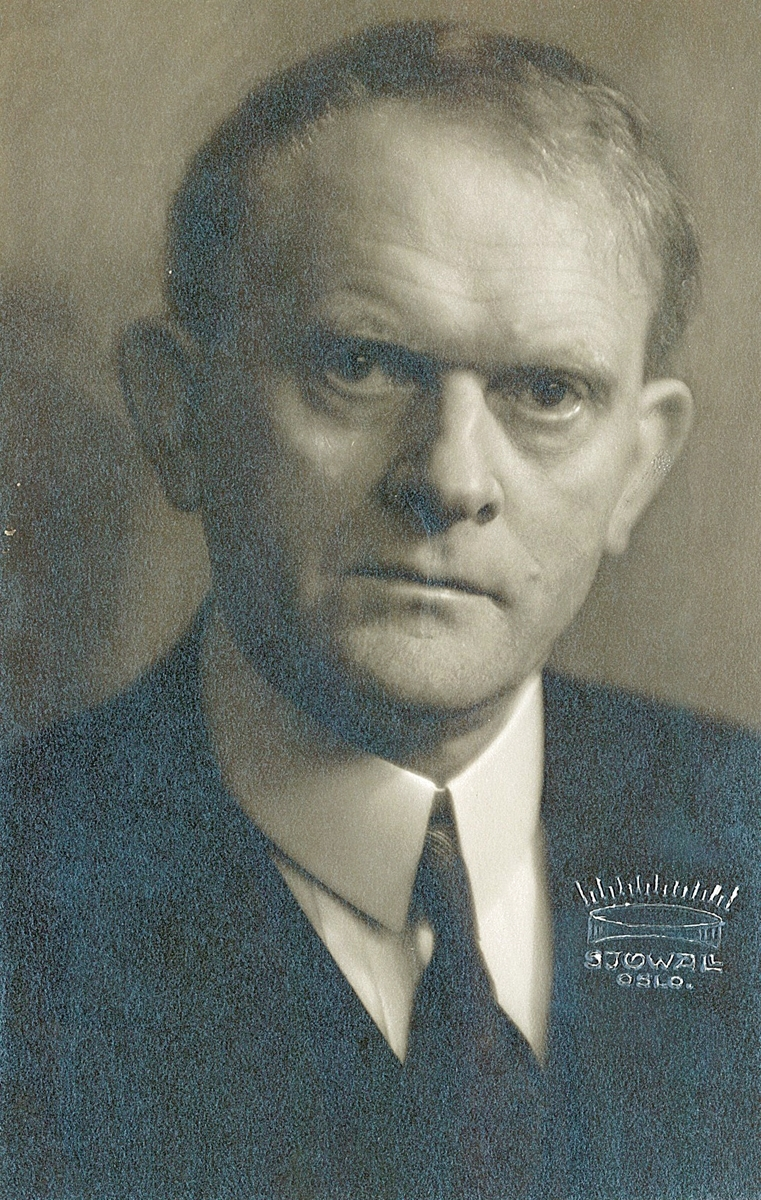
Norwegian composer, music critic and violinist Per Reidarson

Per Reidarson (27 May 1879 – 21 January 1954) was a Norwegian composer and music critic.

In the early twentieth century he was an acknowledged composer. For his body of work he was granted kunstnerlønn, a guaranteed minimum income for artists, by the Norwegian state in 1938. He had also worked as a music critic in the newspapers Tidens Tegn and Arbeiderbladet.

However, he eventually joined the political party Nasjonal Samling and began writing for their official publication Fritt Folk. In 1941–1942, while Norway was occupied by Germany, he held the lecture Norsk og unorsk i musikken ('Norwegian and Un-Norwegian in Music'), anger directed at the perceived "Jewish and Marxist" Modernist music.

In 1945, when the occupation of Norway ended, Reidarson was marginalized and immediately lost his artist's income.
