= Svend S. Schultz =

Danish composer and conductor

Svend Simon Schultz (December 30, 1913 – June 6, 1998) was a Danish composer and conductor. A pupil of Poul Schierbeck.

== Notable works ==
- Bag kulisserne (1949)
- Kaffehuset (1949)
- Solbadet (1949)
- Høst (1950)
- Tordenvejret eller Da Søren blev Mand (1950)
- Bryllupsrejse (1951)
- Marionetterne (1957)
- Hosekræmmeren (1975, opført 1990)

== See also ==
- List of Danish composers
