= Eline Nygaard Riisnæs =

Norwegian pianist and musicologist

- Born: 5 July 1913; Sandefjord, Norway
- Died: 3 February 2011 (aged 97) Oslo, Norway
- Genres: Classical music
- Occupation(s): Musician and musicologist
- Instrument: Piano
- Website: www.hf.uio.no/imv/om/imv-historie/aktorar/eline-nygaard-riisnes.html

Eline Nygaard Riisnæs (5 July 1913 – 3 February 2011) was a Norwegian pianist and musicologist at UiO, mother of the pianist and piano pedagog Anne Eline Riisnæs (1951-), and the saxophonists Knut Riisnæs (1945-) and Odd Riisnæs (1953-).

== Career ==
Nygaard Riisnæs was born in Sandefjord. She studied piano in Oslo with pianists Dagmar Walle-Hansen and Nils Larsen, and in Stockholm with the great Russian pianist Simon Barrere. She debuted in 1939 and played the year after with Oslo Philharmonic Orchestra. In 1949 she toured the United States with among others Kari Frisell. In Norway she had extensive concert collaboration with NRK. She taught Musicology at University of Oslo, and was attached to the University as a lecturer in 1971, associate professor from 1981 to 1983. She died in Oslo, aged 97.

== Honors ==
- "Lindemanprisen" 1979
- Kongens fortjenstmedalje i gull (1983)
