= Natanael Berg =

Swedish composer (1879–1957)

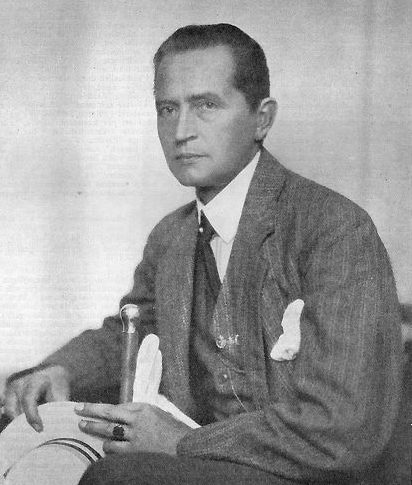

Carl Natanael Rexroth-Berg (9 February 1879 – 14 October 1957) was a Swedish composer.

Berg was born and died in Stockholm. He trained in veterinary medicine and began learning music by teaching himself. He later studied at the Stockholm Conservatory. Until 1939, he served as a veterinarian in the Swedish Army and afterwards became a freelance composer.

His output included five operas, three ballets, five symphonies as well as several symphonic poems, a piano concerto, a violin concerto, a serenade for violin and orchestra, a piano quintet, ballades, lieder, and pieces for piano.

== Chronological list of selected works ==
- Saul och David, 1907
- Eros vrede, 1907
- Traumgewalten, symphonic poem, 1910
- Leila, opera, 1910
- Mannen och kvinnan, 1911
- Predikaren, 1911
- Symphony No. 1 Alles endet was entstehet, 1913
- Varde Ljus, symphonic poem, 1914
- Älvorna, ballet, 1914
- Israels lovsång, 1915
- Symphony No. 2 Årstiderna, 1916
- Symphony No. 3 Makter, 1917
- Piano Quintet, 1917
- Die badenden Kinder, 1918
- Violin Concerto, 1918
- Symphony No. 4 Pezzo Sinfonico, 1918
- Sensitiva, ballet, 1919
- String Quartet, 1919
- Hertiginnans friare, ballet, 1920
- Serenade for Violin and Orchester, 1923
- Symphony No. 5 Trilogia delle passioni, 1924
- Höga Visan, 1925
- Engelbrekt, opera, 1928 (Engelbrecht, Braunschweig, 1933)
- Piano Concerto, 1931
- Judith, opera, 1935
- Birgitta, opera, 1942
- Genoveva, opera, 1944–46
- Tre konungar, Part 1, opera (incomplete), 1950–1954, orchestrated up to 1957
