= Jørgen Jersild =

Danish composer and music educator (1913–2004)

Jørgen Jersild (17 September 1913 – 6 February 2004) was a Danish composer and music educator. He was a pupil of Poul Schierbeck and Albert Roussel. Jersild worked from 1953 to 1975 as a professor of ear training by The Royal Danish Academy of Music in Copenhagen.

== Life ==
Jersild learned how to play the piano at a young age and, when he was twelve, he arranged for the school orchestra and wrote some small compositions. He became a student of Rudolph Simonsen and later Poul Schierbeck, who taught him theory and composition, and Alexander Stoffregen, who gave him lessons on the piano. After a short stay in Paris in 1936 where he was taught for three months by Albert Roussel, he returned home and studied musicology at the University of Copenhagen. In 1940 he majored in musicology, but in 1939 he was employed as a program secretary with the DR, a national radio station in Denmark. In 1943 he became a teacher at The Royal Danish Academy of Music in Copenhagen, during which his music was reviewed by the Berlingske Tidende. From 1953 to 1975, he was professor and taught ear training, instrumentation and composition. During those years he published a number of theoretical and practical musical works.

By 1930 he was engaged in the folkemusikskole movement, which encouraged the teaching of music and schools and the preservation of folk music. Together with Finn Savery, Finn Høffding and Jørgen Bentzon, he worked to spread musical knowledge and skills to children and adults, both in primary and secondary schools of music. In the years 1949–1953, he was chairman of the Danish Music Education Association.

== Music ==
His output as a composer was not large, but included a large number of very well built choruses including 3 Madrigali (1957), Trois piéces en concert for clavier (1945), wind quintet Playing in the woods (1947) and the musical adventure play Alice in Wonderland (1951), based on the book by Lewis Carroll. From 1967 to 1977, he wrote four works which featured the harp. They were inspired by Benjamin Britten and were written for the harp player Osian Ellis. In addition, he wrote music for theater, radio, theater, film and even the winning song of the Dansk Melodi Grand Prix in 1965, For din skyld (For Your Sake), with text of Poul Henningsen and sung by Birgit Brüel in the Eurovision.

His music has been regarded as "French" or at least French-inspired - which can be translated as cultured and elegant. It is written in a clear and elegant modal style rooted in Neoclassicism.

From interview in 1999: When asked, Jersild acknowledged that he was French-influenced he replies: "It may be true - all my starting points were French. It can be observed in the rate structure. If you hear Trois piéces en concert(1945), it is not hard to hear that it is inspired by Ravel's Le Tombeau de Couperin. But it is still a bit more harmonious than Ravel. But I do not think it continued to be French. I think it's much more Danish now, but it may well be I am wrong. '

When asked about his position on Arnold Schoenberg and atonal music, Jersild stated: " ... I think it's kind of putting things upside down to begin with theory and then make music. The music must beam of itself. And so it is perhaps sometimes a later generation given to work out technical, theoretical ideas. I find atonal music hard to follow, because I think that the results do not suggest that it is a good approach. "

Upon receiving the, Nielsen Memorial Scholarship in 1999, Karl Aage Rasmussen, another composer, gave a speech that included following: "Jorgen Jersild's life's work is not comprehensive, and it is perhaps because his music is on the hunt for the particular simplicity and ease with no quick shortcuts to."

== Compositions by year (incomplete) ==
- Duets for Alto and Tenor Recorders (1931)
- The running (plays of Oehlenschläger - 1931)
- Capriccio for piano (1935)
- Ruskantate (1940)
- Two strophic songs (1944)
- Three Songs (1944)
- Trois Pieces en concert (piano - 1945)
- Pastorale for string orchestra (1945)
- Trois pièces en concert for piano - Tambourin, Romanesque, Farandole (1945)
- Playing in the woods - Serenade for wind quintet (1946)
- Days on a cloud (play by Kjeld Abell - 1947)
- Alice in Wonderland - musical tale for children (1950)
- Quartetto piccolo for string quartet (1950)
- Lune Full Lucinda - Ballet (1954)
- Duo concertante - 18 pieces of the 3 - and 4-hændig piano (1956/98)
- Three madrigals for mixed choir a cappella (1958)
- Music for the film Gertrude by Carl Th. Dreyer (1964)
- For your sake (Eurovision winner 1965)
- Fantasia e canto affettuoso per Flauto, clarinetto, violoncello e arpa (Libro d'arpa, seconda parte) (1967)
- Three Danish love songs for mixed chorus (1968)
- Pezzo elegiaco per arpa sola - Libro d'arpa, prima parte (1968)
- Three romantic choral songs for choir a cappella (1971, revised 1984, 1989)
- Concerto per arpa e orchestra - (Libro d'arpa, parte terza) (1972)
- Puzzles from Wonderland (Lewis Carroll) (1975)
- 30 polyrhythmic etudes (1975/76)
- Fantasia per arpa sola (Libro d'arpa, parte Quarta) (1977)
- Für gefühlvolle Spieler - Impromptuer for two harps (1977/82)
- Pastoral for string orchestra (1977)
- Quartetto per archi (1980)
- 2 Impromptus - two strainers (1984)
- 15 piano pieces to Juliet (1984/85)
- Fantasia per organo (1985)
- Three madrigali latini per coro a cappella (1987)
- 10 Impromtus for violin & guitar (1987)
- Fantasia per piano solo (1987/89)
- 21 selected nursery rhyme of Halfdan Rasmussen (1989)
- Cadenzas to Mozart's Concerto for Flute and Harp (April 1991)
- Il Cantico delle creature (Francis of Assisi / John Jorgensen - 1992)
- Jeu polyrythmique, Trois études pour piano (1992)
- Cadenzas for Mozart's concerto for flute and harp [KV 299] (1992)
- A stick I found - a puzzle by Lewis Carroll (mixed choir 1995)
- The church bell - 3 and 4-part rate (Grundtvig - 1995)
- Recorder Music I - 7 duets (1997)
- Recorder Music II - 7 quartets (1997)
- Two Impromptus for piano solo (1997)

== Books ==
- Textbook in solfege (1950)
- Basic rhythm exercises (1957)
- Textbook of melody reading (1959)
- Textbook of rhythm reading (1961)
- The functional principles of Romanticism harmonics (1970)
- Higher rhythm studies - cross rhythms (1975/98)
- Jorgen Jersild: Analytical harmony (1989)
- Scales, cadences and 3-tones - practiced templates, fingering, pedal use mm. and 5 pieces for piano (1999)

== Honors and awards (incomplete) ==
- 1952 The Anckerske Scholarship
- 1962 Member of the Royal Swedish Academy of Music
- 1995 Årets Korkomponist (Choral composer of the year)
- 1999 Nielsen Memorial Scholarship

== See also ==
- List of Danish composers
