= List of compositions by Edvard Grieg =

The following is a sortable list of compositions by Edvard Grieg (1843–1907). The works are categorized by genre, catalogue number, date of composition and titles.

Catalogue numbers (Cat. No.) of compositions by Edvard Grieg include, according to the catalogue compiled by Dan Fog and the Edvard Grieg Committee:

- Opus numbers (Op.) 1–74
- EG numbers (EG) 101–181, for works with no assigned opus number

Scoring	Cat. No.	Date	Norwegian title (original title)	English title	Notes
Piano	EG 101	1858?	Larvikspolka	Polka from Larvik	Possibly spurious
Piano	EG 102	1858–1859	Tre klaverstykker: 1. Lengsel; 2. Allegro con moto 3. Allegro assai	3 Piano Pieces	
Piano	EG 103	1858–1859	Ni barnestykker: 1. Allegro agitato 2. Perler; 3. Ved Gellerts Grav; 4. Bønn; 5. Tap; 6. Femårsdagen; 7. Allegretto con moto 8. Scherzo; 9. En Drøm	9 Pieces for Children	
Piano	EG 104	1858–1859	23 Småstykker: 1. Allegretto agitato 2. Lengsel; 3. Allegro desiderio 4. Andante quasi allegretto 5. Allegro assai 6. Allegro con moto 7. En drøm 8. Allegro assai 9. Perler; 10. Ved Gellerts Grav; 11. Vivace; 12. Preludium; 13. Allegretto con moto 14. Allegretto con moto 15. To-stemmig Preludium; 16. Scherzo; 17. Molto adagio religioso 18. Femårsdagen; 19. Bønn; 20. Allegro vivace 21. Tap; 22. Nicht zu schnell, ruhig 23. Assai allegro furioso	23 Little Piano Pieces	
Vocal	EG 121	1859	Siehst du das Meer	Look to the Sea	for voice and piano; words by Emanuel Geibel
Vocal	EG 122	1860	Den syngende Menighet	The Singing Congregation	for alto and piano; words by N. F. S. Grundtvig
Piano	EG 105	1860	Tre klaverstykker: 1. Allegro agitato 2. Allegretto; 3. Allegro molto e vivace, quasi presto	3 Piano Pieces	
Hardanger fiddle	EG 178		Halling	Halling	Notated Harding fiddle tune, fragment
Piano	EG 179	1860	Canon a 4 voci	Canon in 4 Voices	
Piano	Op. 1	1861	Fire pianostykker: 1. Allegro con leggerezza 2. Non allegro e molto espressivo 3. Mazurka: Con grazia 4. Allegretto con moto	4 Piano Pieces	
Vocal	Op. 2	1861	Fire Sanger: 1. Die Müllerin; 2. Eingehüllt in grauen Wolken; 3. Ich stand in dunkeln Träumen; 4. Was soll ich sagen?	4 Songs: 1. The Maid of the Mill; 2. Closely Wrapped in Misty Billows; 3. I Stood Before Her Portrait; 4. What Shall I Say?	for alto and piano; words by: Adelbert von Chamisso (1, 4); Heinrich Heine (2, 3)
Chamber music	EG 114	1861	Fuge i f-moll	Fugue in F minor	for 2 violins, viola and cello
Choral	EG 159	1862	Dona nobis pacem	Dona nobis pacem for mixed chorus	for mixed chorus
Piano	Op. 3	1863	Poetiske Tonebilder: 1. Allegro ma non troppo 2. Allegro cantabile 3. Con moto 4. Andante con sentimento 5. Allegro moderato 6. Allegro scherzando	Poetic Tone Pictures	
Choral	EG 160	1863?	Fire sanger for mannsstemmer: 1. Norsk Krigssang; 2. Fredriksborg; 3. Studereliv; 4. Den sildige rose	4 Songs for Male Chorus	for male chorus 1. words by Henrik Wergeland; 2. words by Christian Richardt; 3. words by Christian Richardt; 4. words by Andreas Munch
Vocal	Op. 4	1863–1864	Seks Digte: 1. Die Waise; 2. Morgen Thau; 3. Abschied; 4. Jägerlied; 5. Das alte Lied; 6. Wo sind sie hin?	6 Poems: 1. The Orphan; 2. Morning Dew; 3. Parting; 4. Hunting Song; 5. The Old Song; 6. Where Have They Gone?	for alto and piano 1. words by Adelbert von Chamisso; 2. words by Adelbert von Chamisso; 3. words by Heinrich Heine; 4. words by Ludwig Uhland; 5. words by Heinrich Heine; 6. words by Heinrich Heine
Orchestral	EG 119	1863–1864	Symfoni i c-moll	Symphony No. 1 in C minor	movements II and III arranged for piano 4-hands as 2 Symphonic Pieces, Op. 14
Vocal	EG 123	1864	Til kirken hun vandrer	Devoutest of Maidens	for voice and piano; words by Benjamin Feddersen
Vocal	EG 124	1864	Claras sang	Clara's Song	for voice and piano; from Frieriet paa Helgoland (Courting on Helgoland) by Benjamin Feddersen after Ludwig Schneider; see No. 3 from 5 Songs Dedicated to Louis Hornbeck
Choral	EG 161	1864	Danmark	Denmark	for mixed chorus and piano; words by Hans Christian Andersen
Vocal	Op. 5	1864–1865	Hjertets Melodier: 1. To brune Øjne; 2. Du fatter ej Bølgernes evige Gang; 3. Jeg elsker dig 4. Min tanke er et mægtigt Fjeld	Melodies of the Heart: 1. Two Brown Eyes; 2. The Poet's Heart; 3. I Love But Thee!; 4. My Mind Is Like a Mountain Steep	for voice and piano; words by Hans Christian Andersen: 2. also for piano: Op. 52 No. 3; 3. also for piano: Op. 41 No. 3
Piano	EG 106	1865	Agitato	Agitato	
Piano	Op. 6	1865	Humoresker: 1. Tempo di valse 2. Tempo di Menuetto ed energico 3. Allegretto con grazia 4. Allegro alla burla	Humoresques	
Piano	Op. 7	1865, 1867	Sonate for piano i e-moll: 1. Allegro moderato 2. Andante molto 3. Alla Menuetto, ma poco più lento 4. Finale. Molto allegro	Piano Sonata in E minor	
Chamber music	Op. 8	1865	Sonate nr. 1 i F-dur	Violin Sonata No. 1 in F major	for violin and piano
Vocal	EG 125	1865	Soldaten	The Soldier	for voice and piano; words by Hans Christian Andersen; see No. 2 of 5 Songs Dedicated to Louis Hornbeck
Vocal	EG 126	1865	Min lille fugl	My Little Bird	for voice and piano; words by Hans Christian Andersen
Vocal	EG 127	1865	Dig elsker jeg	I Love You, Dear	for voice and piano; words by Caralis, i.e. Caspara Preetzmann
Vocal	EG 128	1865	Tåren	The Tear	for voice and piano; words by Hans Christian Andersen
Vocal	Op. 9	1863–1866	Romanser og Ballader: 1. Harpen; 2. Vuggesang; 3. Solnedgang; 4. Udfarten	Romances and Ballades: 1. The Harp; 2. Cradle Song; 3. Sunset; 4. Outward Bound	for voice and piano; words by Andreas Munch: 2. also for piano: Op. 41 No. 1; 3. see No. 5 of 5 Songs Dedicated to Louis Hornbeck
Vocal	Op. 10	1864	4 Romanser: 1. Tagsigelse; 2. Skovsang; 3. Blomsterne tale 4. Sang på Fjeldet	4 Romances: 1. Thanks; 2. Woodland Song; 3. Song of the Flowers; 4. Song on the Mountain	for voice and piano; words by Christian Winther
Piano	Op. 11	1866	I Høst	In Autumn	for piano 4-hands; also orchestrated
Orchestral	Op. 11	1866	I Høst	In Autumn	orchestrated 1887; original for piano 4-hands
Chamber music	EG 115	1866?	Intermezzo	Intermezzo in A minor	for cello and piano
Piano	Op. 12	1866–1867	Lyriske stykker, hefte I: 1. Arietta; 2. Vals; 3. Vægtersang; 4. Elverdans; 5. Folkevise; 6. Norsk; 7. Stambogsblad; 8. Fædrelandssang	Lyric Pieces, Book I: 1. Arietta; 2. Waltz; 3. Watchman's Song; 4. Elves' Dance; 5. Folk Song; 6. Norwegian Melody; 7. Album Leaf; 8. National Song	
Piano	EG 107	1866	Sørgemarsj over Rikard Nordraak	Funeral March in Memory of Rikard Nordraak in A minor	revised 1878; also orchestrated
Orchestral	EG 107	1892	Sørgemarsj over Rikard Nordraak	Funeral March in Memory of Rikard Nordraak in A minor	orig. for piano (1866, rev. 1878)
Vocal	EG 129	1866	Vesle gut	Little Lad	for voice and piano; words by Kristoffer Janson
Vocal	EG 130	1867	Den blonde Pige (I)	The Fair Haired Maid (I)	for voice and piano; words by Bjørnstjerne Bjørnson
Choral	EG 162	1867	To sanger av Jørgen Moe: 1. Aftenstemning; 2. Bjørneskytten	2 Songs of Jørgen Moe	for male chorus; words by Jørgen Moe
Chamber music	Op. 13	1867	Sonate nr. 2 i G-dur	Violin Sonata No. 2 in G major	for violin and piano
Piano	Op. 14	1863–1864	To symfoniske stykker: 1. Adagio cantabile 2. Allegro energico	2 Symphonic Pieces	for piano 4-hands; based on the second and third movements of Symphony No. 1, EG 119
Vocal	Op. 15	1864–1868	Romancer: 1. Margretes Vuggesang af "Kongs-Emnerne"; 2. Kjærlighet; 3. Langelandsk Folkemelodi; 4. Modersorg	Romances: 1. Margaret's Cradle Song from "Kongsemnerne"; 2. Love; 3. Folk Song from Langeland; 4. A Mother's Grief	for voice and piano; 1. words by Henrik Ibsen; also for piano: Op. 41 No. 2; 2. words by Hans Christian Andersen; also for piano: Op. 52 No. 5; see No. 1 of 5 Songs Dedicated to Louis Hornbeck; 3. words by Hans Christian Andersen; see No. 4 of 5 Songs Dedicated to Louis Hornbeck; 4. words by Christian Richardt; also for piano: Op. 52 No. 1
Concertante	Op. 16	1868	Klaverkonsert i a-moll	Piano Concerto in A minor	for piano and orchestra
Choral	EG 158	1868	Kantate ved avsløringen av Christie-stauen	Christie Cantata	for male chorus and orchestra; words by Andreas Munch
Choral	EG 163	1869	Sjømannssang	Seamen's Song	for male chorus; words by Bjørnstjerne Bjørnson
Piano	Op. 17	1869	25 Norske Folkeviser og Danser: 1. Springdans; 2. Ungersvenden han bad sin pige 3. Springdans; 4. Niels Tallefjorn den kaute karen 5. Jølstring; 6. Brulåt; 7. Halling; 8. Aa grisen hadde eit tryne 9. Naar mit øie 10. Aa Ole engang i sinde 11. På Dovrefjeld i Norge; 12. Solfager og Ormekongen; 13. Reiseslaatt; 14. Jeg sjunger med sorrigfuldt hjerte 15. Den sidste laurdags kvelden 16. Je veit ei lita jente 17. Aa kleggen han sa no te flugga si 18. Stabbe-Låten; 19. Hølje Dale; 20. Halling; 21. Sæbygga; 22. So lokka me over den myra 23. Saag du nokke te kjæringa mi 24. Brulåten; 25. Rabnabryllaup i Kraakeland	25 Norwegian Folk Songs and Dances: 1. Spring Dance; 2. The Young Man Asked His Maiden; 3. Spring Dance; 4. Niels Tallefjorn, Proud Fellow; 5. Dance from Jølster; 6. Wedding Tune; 7. Halling; 8. Oh, the Pig Had a Snout; 9. When My Eyes; 10. Ole Once in Anger; 11. On the Dovrefjeld in Norway; 12. Solfager and the Snake King; 13. Wedding Recessional March; 14. I Sing with a Sorrowful Heart; 15. The Last Saturday Night; 16. I Know of a Little Maiden; 17. The Gadfly Said to the Fly; 18. Stumping Dance; 19. Hølje Dale; 20. Halling; 21. The Woman from Setesdal; 22. Cattle Call; 23. Did You See Anything of My Wife?; 24. Wedding Tune; 25. The Raven's Wedding in Kraakeland	
Vocal	Op. 18	1865–1869	9 Romancer og Sange: 1. Vandring i Skoven; 2. Hun er saa hvid 3. En Digters sidste Sang; 4. Efteraarsstormen; 5. Poesien; 6. Ungbirken; 7. Hytten; 8. Rosenknoppen; 9. Serenade til Welhaven	Romances and Songs: 1. Moonlit Forest; 2. My Darling Is as White as Snow; 3. The Poet's Farewell; 4. Autumn Storms; 5. Poetry; 6. The Young Birch Tree; 7. The Cottage; 8. Rosebuds; 9. Serenade for Welhaven	for mezzo-soprano or baritone and piano except No. 9; 1. words by Hans Christian Andersen; 2. words by Hans Christian Andersen; also for piano: Op. 41 No. 4; 3. words by Hans Christian Andersen; 4. words by Christian Richardt; 5. words by Hans Christian Andersen; 6. words by Jørgen Moe; 7. words by Hans Christian Andersen; 8. words by Hans Christian Andersen; 9. for baritone solo and male quartet; words by Bjørnstjerne Bjørnson
Vocal	EG 131	1870	Odalisken synger	The Odalisque	for voice and piano; words by Carl Brun
Vocal	EG 132	1870	Bergmanden	The Miner	for voice and piano; words by Henrik Ibsen
Piano	Op. 19	1870–1871	Folkelivsbilder: 1. Fjeldslåt; 2. Brudefølget drar forbi 3. Fra Karnevalet	Scenes of Country Life: 1. Mountain Dance; 2. The Bridal Procession Passes; 3. From the Carnival	
Vocal	EG 133	1871	Prinsessen	The Princess	for voice and piano; words by Bjørnstjerne Bjørnson; also for piano: Op. 41 No. 5
Choral	Op. 20	1871	Foran Sydens Kloster	Before a Southern Convent; also known as At the Cloister Gate	for soprano, alto, female chorus and orchestra; words from Arnljot Gelline by Bjørnstjerne Bjørnson
Vocal	Op. 21	1870–1872	Fire Digte af "Fiskerjenten": 1. Det første Møde; 2. God morgen 3. Jeg giver mit Digt til Våren; 4. Tak for dit Råd	4 Poems from "Fiskerjenten": 1. The First Meeting; 2. Good Morning; 3. To Springtime My Song I'm Singing; 4. Say What You Will	for voice and piano; words by Bjørnstjerne Bjørnson; 1. also for piano: Op. 52 No. 2; and string orchestra: Op. 53 No. 2: 3. also for piano: Op. 41 No. 6
Stage	Op. 22	1872	Sigurd Jorsalfar: 1. Innledning til Akt I 2. Borghilds Drøm; 3. Ved Mandjevningen; 4. Kvad: Norrønafolket; 5. Hyldningsmarsch; 6. Mellomspill I 7. Mellomspill II; 8. Kongekvadet; 9. Hornsignaler	Sigurd Jorsalfar: 1. Prelude to Act I 2. Borghild's Dream; 3. At the Matching Game; 4. Song: The Northland Folk; 5. Homage March; 6. Interlude I 7. Interlude II; 8. The King's Song; 9. Horn Signals	Incidental music to the play by Bjørnstjerne Bjørnson for tenor or baritone, male chorus and orchestra; orchestral excerpts: Op. 56
Vocal	EG 134	1873	Suk	Sighs	for voice and piano; words by Bjørnstjerne Bjørnson
Vocal	EG 135	1873	Til L. M. Lindemans Sølvbryllup	For L. M. Lindeman's Silver Wedding Anniversary	for voice and piano; words by V. B. Nicolaysen
Vocal	EG 136	1873	Til Generalkonsul Chr. Tønsberg	To Chr. Tønsberg	for voice and piano; words by Johan Bøgh
Vocal	EG 137	1873	Den hvite, røde rose	The White and Red, Red Roses	for voice and piano; words by Bjørnstjerne Bjørnson
Choral	EG 165	1873	Ved J. S. Welhavens Båre		for male chorus; words by Jørgen Moe
Vocal	EG 138	1874	Den blonde Pige (II)	The Fair Haired Maid (II)	for voice and piano; words by Bjørnstjerne Bjørnson
Choral	EG 164	1874	Kantate til Karl Hals	Cantata to Karl Hals	for tenor, female chorus, mixed chorus and piano; words by Bjørnstjerne Bjørnson
Choral	EG 166	1874	Oppsang for frihetsfolket i Norden		for male chorus; words by Bjørnstjerne Bjørnson
Choral	EG 167	1874	Ved Halfdan Kjerulfs minnestøtte	At the Halfdan Kjerulf Statue	for tenor and male chorus; words by Andreas Munch
Vocal	EG 108	1874–1875	Norges melodier	Norwegian Melodies	for voice and piano
Piano	EG 108	1874–1875	Seks Norske fjellmelodier	6 Norwegian Mountain Melodies	transcriptions from Norges melodier (1886)
Vocal	EG 139	1875	Morgenbønn på skolen	Morning Prayer at School	for voice and piano; words by Fredrik Gjertsen
Stage	Op. 23	1875	Peer Gynt	Peer Gynt	Incidental music to the play by Henrik Ibsen
Piano	Op. 24	1875–1876	Ballade i form av variasjoner over en norsk folkevise i g-moll	Ballade in the Form of Variations on a Norwegian Folk Song in G minor	
Vocal	Op. 25	1876	Sex Digte af Ibsens: 1. Spillemænd; 2. En Svane; 3. Stambogsrim; 4. Med en Vandlilje; 5. Borte!; 6. En Fuglevise	6 Poems (Ibsen Songs): 1. Fiddlers; 2. A Swan; 3. Album Lines; 4. With a Water Lily; 5. Departed; 6. A Bird-Song	for voice and piano; words by Henrik Ibsen
Vocal	Op. 26	1876	Fem Digte af John Paulsen: 1. Et Håb; 2. Jeg reiste en deilig Sommerkvæld; 3. De Ærgjerrige; 4. Med en Primula veris 5. På Skogstien	5 Poems: 1. Hope; 2. I Walked One Balmy Summer Eve; 3. You Whispered That You Loved Me; 4. The First Primrose; 5. Autumn Thoughts	for voice and piano; words by John Paulsen
Chamber music	EG 116	1877	Andante con moto i c-moll	Andante con moto in C minor	for violin, cello and piano; probably part of a Piano Trio in A or G
Chamber music	Op. 27	1877–1878	Strykekvartett i g-moll	String Quartet in G minor	for 2 violins, viola and cello
Piano	Op. 28	1864–1878	Albumblad: 1. Allegro con moto i Ass-dur; 2. Allegretto espressivo i F-dur; 3. Vivace i A-dur; 4. Andantino serioso i ciss-moll	Album Leaves: 1. Allegro con moto in A♭ major 2. Allegretto espressivo in F major 3. Vivace in A major 4. Andantino serioso in C♯ minor	
Piano	EG 109	1878	Albumblad	Album Leaf	
Piano	Op. 29	1878	Improvisata over to norske folkeviser: 1. Guten og gjenta på fjøshellen 2. Dæ var eigong en Kungje	Improvisations on Two Norwegian Folk Songs	
Choral	Op. 30	1877–1878	Album for Mannsang: 1. Jeg lagde mig så sildig 2. Bådn-Låt; 3. Torø liti 4. Halling; 5. Dæ æ den største Dårligheit; 6. Går e ut ein Kveld; 7. Han Ole; 8. Halling; 9. Deiligste blandt Kvinder; 10. Den store, hvide Flok; 11. Fantegutten; 12. Røtnams Knut	Album for Male Voices	for tenor, baritone, bass-baritone and male chorus; 12 arrangements
Choral	Op. 31	1872	Landkjenning	Land Sighting	for baritone, male chorus and harmonium; words by Bjørnstjerne Bjørnson
Piano	EG 113	1876–1877	Piano II til fire sonater av Mozart	Second Piano Part to 4 Mozart Sonatas	K.533/494, K.475/457, K.545, K.189h
Vocal	Op. 32	1877–1878	Den Bergtekne	The Mountain Thrall	for baritone, string orchestra and horns
Vocal	Op. 33	1873–1880	Tolv Melodier (Vinjesangene): 1. Guten; 2. Våren; 3. Den sårede 4. Tytteæret; 5. Langs ei Aa; 6. Eit Syn; 7. Gamle Mor; 8. Det Første; 9. Ved Rundarne; 10. Et Vennestykke; 11. Trudom; 12. Fyremål	12 Melodies (Vinje Songs): 1. The Youth; 2. Last Spring; 3. The Wounded Heart; 4. The Berry; 5. Beside the Stream; 6. A Vision; 7. The Old Mother; 8. The First Thing; 9. At Rondane; 10. A Piece of Friendship; 11. Faith; 12. The Goal	for voice and piano; words by Aasmund Olavsson Vinje: 7. also for piano: Op. 52 No. 6; 12. also for string orchestra: Op. 53 No. 1
Piano	Op. 34	1880	To elegiske melodier: 1. Hjertesår; 2. Våren	Two Elegiac Melodies: 1. The Wounded Heart; 2. The Last Spring	also arranged for string orchestra
Orchestral	Op. 34	1880	To elegiske melodier: 1. Hjertesår; 2. Våren	Two Elegiac Melodies: 1. The Wounded Heart; 2. The Last Spring	for string orchestra; original for piano
Vocal	EG 140	1880	På Hamars ruiner	On the Ruins of Hamar	for voice and piano; words by Aasmund Olavsson Vinje
Vocal	EG 141	1880	Jenta	The Lass	for voice and piano; words by Aasmund Olavsson Vinje
Vocal	EG 142	1880	Attegløyma	The Forgotten Maid	for voice and piano; words by Aasmund Olavsson Vinje
Vocal	EG 143	1880–?	Dyre Vaa	Dyre from Vaa	for voice and piano; words by Johan Sebastian Welhaven; fragment
Piano	Op. 35	1881	Norske danser: 1. Allegro marcato 2. Allegretto tranquillo e grazioso 3. Allegro moderato alla marcia 4. Allegro molto	Norwegian Dances	for piano 4-hands; orchestrated by Hans Sitt
Orchestral	Op. 35	1881	Norske danser	Norwegian Dances	Nos. 2 & 3 arranged for orchestra by Frank van der Stucken, rewritten by Grieg (ms)
Choral	EG 169	1881	To Mannskorsanger: 1. Min deiligste tanke 2. Vårt løsen	2 Male Choruses	for male chorus; words by Olav Lofthus
Choral	EG 170	1883	Sangerhilsen		for male chorus; words by Sigvald Skavland
Chamber music	Op. 36	1883	Sonate i a-moll	Cello Sonata in A minor	for cello and piano
Piano	Op. 37	1883	Valse-kapriser: 1. Tempo di Valse moderato i ciss-moll 2. Tempo di Valse i e-moll	Valse Caprices: 1. Tempo di Valse moderato in C♯ minor 2. Tempo di Valse in E minor	for piano 4-hands; arranged for solo piano in 1887
Piano	Op. 38	1883	Lyriske stykker, hefte II: 1. Vuggevise; 2. Folkevise; 3. Melodie; 4. Halling; 5. Springdans; 6. Elegie; 7. Vals; 8. Kanon	Lyric Pieces, Book II: 1. Cradle Song; 2. Folk Song; 3. Melody; 4. Halling; 5. Spring Dance; 6. Elegy; 7. Waltz; 8. Canon	
Chamber music	EG 118	1883	Fragmenter av en pianokvintett	Piano Quintet in B♭ major (fragment)	for 2 violins, viola, cello and piano; main theme taken from EG 120
Concertante	EG 120	1883–?	Fragmenter av Pianokonsert i h-moll	Concerto No. 2 in B minor (fragment)	for piano and orchestra
Vocal	Op. 39	1869–1884	Romancer (ældre og nyere): 1. Fra Monte Pincio; 2. Dulgt Kjærlighed; 3. I Liden højt deroppe 4. Millom Roser; 5. Ved en ung Hustrus Båre; 6. Hører jeg Sangen klinge	Romances (Earlier and Later): 1. From Monte Pincio: Nocturne; 2. Hidden Love; 3. Upon a Grassy Hillside; 4. Among Roses; 5. At the Grave of a Young Wife; 6. Hearing a Song or Carol	for voice and piano; 1. words by Bjørnstjerne Bjørnson; 2. words by Bjørnstjerne Bjørnson; 3. words by Jonas Lie; 4. words by Kristoffer Janson; 5. words by Olaf Peder Monrad; 6. words by Nordahl Rolfsen after Heinrich Heine
Vocal	Op. 39		Ved en ung hustrus båre	At the Grave of a Young Wife	for voice and reed organ; arranged from Op. 39 No. 5
Piano	Op. 40	1884	Fra Holbergs tid: 1. Prelude; 2. Sarabande; 3. Gavotte; 4. Air; 5. Rigaudon	Holberg Suite	
Orchestral	Op. 40	1884–1885	Fra Holbergs tid: 1. Prelude; 2. Sarabande; 3. Gavotte; 4. Air; 5. Rigaudon	Holberg Suite	for string orchestra
Choral	EG 171	1884	Holberg-kantate	Holberg Cantata	for baritone and male chorus; words by Nordahl Rolfsen
Piano	Op. 41	1884	Klaverstykker etter egne sanger, hefte I: 1. Vuggesang; 2. Liden Håkon; 3. Jeg elsker dig 4. Hun er saa hvid 5. Prinsessen; 6. Jeg giver mit digt til våren	Piano Pieces after Original Songs, Volume I: 1. Lullaby; 2. Little Håkon; 3. I Love Thee; 4. She Is So White; 5. The Princess; 6. To Springtime	for piano 1. original version: Op. 9 No. 2; 2. original version: Op. 15 No. 1; 3. original version: Op. 5 No. 3; 4. original version: Op. 18 No. 2; 5. original version: EG 133; 6. original version, Op. 21 No. 3
Vocal	EG 144	1885	Under Juletræet	Beneath the Christmas Tree	for voice and piano; words by Nordahl Rolfsen
Vocal	Op. 42	1871, 1885	Bergliot	Bergliot	Melodrama for speaker and piano or orchestra; words by Bjørnstjerne Bjørnson
Piano	Op. 43	1886	Lyriske stykker, hefte III: 1. Sommerfugl; 2. Ensom vandrer 3. I Hjemmet; 4. Liden Fugl; 5. Erotik; 6. Til Foråret	Lyric Pieces, Book III: 1. Butterfly; 2. Solitary Traveler; 3. In My Native Country; 4. Little Bird; 5. Erotikon; 6. To Spring	
Vocal	EG 180		Andante	Andante (sketch)	for orchestra; sketch; related to Haugtussa, Op. 67?
Vocal	EG 181	1886	Ragnhild		alternate version, edited version as Op. 44 No. 3; words by Holger Drachmann
Vocal	Op. 44		Fra Fjeld og Fjord: 1. Prolog; 2. Johanne; 3. Ragnhild; 4. Ingebjørg; 5. Ragna; 6. Epilog	Reminiscences from Mountain and Fjord	for voice and piano; words by Holger Drachmann
Chamber music	Op. 45	1886–1887	Sonate nr. 3 i c-moll	Violin Sonata No. 3 in C minor	for violin and piano
Orchestral	Op. 46	1874–1875	Peer Gynt suite nr. 1: 1. Morgenstemning; 2. Åses Død; 3. Anitras Dans; 4. I Dovregubbens Hall	Peer Gynt Suite No. 1: 1. Morning Mood; 2. Aase's Death; 3. Anitra's Dance; 4. In the Hall of the Mountain King	revised 1885, 1888
Piano	Op. 47	1885–1888	Lyriske stykker, hefte IV: 1. Valse-Impromptu; 2. Albumblad; 3. Melodie; 4. Halling; 5. Melankoli; 6. Springdans; 7. Elegie	Lyric Pieces, Book IV: 1. Valse-Impromptu; 2. Album Leaf; 3. Melody; 4. Halling; 5. Melancholy; 6. Spring Dance; 7. Elegy	
Vocal	Op. 48	1884, 1889	6 Lieder: 1. Gruß (Hilsen); 2. Dereinst, Gedanke mein (Jeg ved, min Tanke); 3. Lauf der Welt (Verdens Gang); 4. Die verschwiegene Nachtigall (Nattergalen); 5. Zur Rosenzeit (I Rosetiden); 6. Ein Traum (En Drøm)	6 Songs: 1. Greeting; 2. One Day, O Heart of Mine; 3. The Way of the World; 4. The Nightingale's Secret; 5. The Time of Roses; 6. A Dream	for voice and piano; Norwegian translation by Nordahl Rolfsen; 1. words by Heinrich Heine; 2. words by Emanuel Geibel; 3. words by Ludwig Uhland; 4. words by Walter von der Vogelweide; 5. words by Johann Wolfgang von Goethe; 6. words by Friedrich von Bodenstedt
Vocal	Op. 49	1886–1889	6 Digte af Holger Drachmann: 1. Så du Knøsen, som strøg forbi 2. Vug, o Vove; 3. Vær hilset, i Damer; 4. Nu er Aftnen lys og lang 5. Jule-Sne; 6. Forårsregn	6 Poems by Holger Drachmann: 1. Tell Me Now, Did You See the Lad; 2. Rocking, Rocking on Gentle Waves; 3. Kind Greetings, Fair Ladies; 4. Now Is Evening Light and Long; 5. Christmas Snow; 6. Spring Showers	for voice and piano; words by Holger Drachmann
Stage	Op. 50	1873; 1888–1889	Olav Trygvason	Olav Trygvason	projected opera; three scenes completed, libretto by Bjørnstjerne Bjørnson
Vocal	EG 146	1889	Påskesang	Easter song	for voice and piano; words by Adolf Böttger
Vocal	EG 147	1889	Simpel sang	A Simple Song	for voice and piano; words by Holger Drachmann
Vocal	EG 148	1889	Du retter tidt dit øjepar	You Often Fix Your Gaze	for voice and piano; words by Holger Drachmann
Piano	Op. 51	1890	Gammel norsk melodi med variasjoner	Old Norwegian Melody with Variations	for 2 pianos; also orchestrated
Orchestral	Op. 51	1890	Gammel norsk melodi med variasjoner	Old Norwegian Melody with Variations	orchestrated 1900–1905; original for 2 pianos
Piano	Op. 52	1890	Klaverstykker etter egne sanger, hefte II: 1. Modersorg; 2. Det første møte 3. Du fatter ei Bølgernes evige Gang; 4. Solveigs sang 5. Kjærlighed; 6. Du gamle Mor	Piano Pieces after Original Songs, Volume II: 1. A Mother's Grief; 2. The First Meeting; 3. The Poet's Heart; 4. Solveig's Song; 5. Love; 6. The Old Mother	for piano 1. original version: Op. 15 No. 4; 2. original version: Op. 21 No. 1; 3. original version: Op. 5 No. 2; 4. original version from Peer Gynt, Op. 23; 5. original version: Op. 15 No. 2; 6. original version, Op. 33 No. 7
Chamber music	EG 117	1890–?	Strykekvartett nr. 2 i F-dur	String Quartet No. 2 in F major (fragment)	for 2 violins, viola and cello; only 2 movements completed
Orchestral	Op. 53	1891	To Melodier for Strykeorkester etter egne Sanger: 1. Norsk; 2. Det første Møte	2 Melodies for String Orchestra after Original Songs: 1. Norwegian Melody; 2. The First Meeting	1. original version: Op. 33 No. 12; 2. original version: Op. 21 No. 1
Piano	Op. 54	1891	Lyriske stykker, hefte V: 1. Gjætergut; 2. Gangar; 3. Troldtog; 4. Notturno; 5. Scherzo; 6. Klokkeklang	Lyric Pieces, Book V: 1. Shepherd's Boy; 2. Gangar; 3. March of the Dwarfs; 4. Nocturne; 5. Scherzo; 6. Bell Ringing	4 numbers also orchestrated as Lyric Suite
Orchestral	Op. 54	1891	Lyrisk suite: 1. Gjætergut; 2. Gangar; 3. Notturno; 4. Troldtog	Lyric Suite: 1. Shepherd's Boy; 2. Gangar; 3. Nocturne; 4. March of the Dwarfs	orchestrated 1904, as revision of orchestrations made in 1894 by Anton Seidl; original for piano
Orchestral	Op. 55	1875, 1891	Peer Gynt suite nr. 2: 1. Bruderovet – Ingrids Klage; 2. Arabisk Dans; 3. Peer Gynts Hjemfart; 4. Solveigs Sang	Peer Gynt Suite No. 2: 1. The Abduction of the Bride – Ingrid's Lament; 2. Arabian Dance; 3. Peer Gynt's Homecoming (Stormy Evening on the Sea); 4. Solveig's Song	
Orchestral	Op. 56	1872, 1892	Tre Orkesterstykker fra Sigurd Jorsalfar: 1. Prelude: Ved Mannjevningen; 2. Intermezzo: Borhilds Drøm; 3. Hyldningsmarsch	3 Orchestral Pieces from "Sigurd Jorsalfar": 1. Prelude: At the Matching Game; 2. Intermezzo: Borghild's Dream; 3. Homage March	from Op. 22
Vocal	EG 177	1892; 1894–1895	Seks sanger med orkester: 1. Solveigs sang 2. Solveigs Vuggevise; 3. Fra Monte Pincio; 4. En Svane; 5. Våren; 6. Henrik Wergeland	6 Songs with Orchestra: 1. Solveig's Song; 2. Solveig's Lullaby; 3. From Monte Pincio; 4. A Swan; 5. The Last Spring; 6. Henrik Wergeland	1. words by Henrik Ibsen; 2. words by Henrik Ibsen; 3. words by Bjørnstjerne Bjørnson; 4. words by Henrik Ibsen; 5. words by Aasmund Olavsson Vinje; 6. words by John Paulsen
Piano	Op. 57	1893	Lyriske stykker, hefte VI: 1. Svundne Dage; 2. Gade; 3. Illusion; 4. Hemmelighed; 5. Hun dances 6. Hjemve	Lyric Pieces, Book VI: 1. Vanished Days; 2. Gade; 3. Illusion; 4. Secret; 5. She Dances; 6. Homesickness	
Vocal	EG 149	1893	Valgsang	Election Song	for voice and piano; words by Bjørnstjerne Bjørnson; originally composed for male chorus
Vocal	EG 150	1893	Ave, maris stella	Ave, maris stella	for voice and piano; Latin hymn
Choral	EG 172	1893	Flaggvise		for male chorus; words by Johan Brun
Vocal	Op. 58	1893–1894	Norge: 1. Hjemkomst; 2. Til Norge; 3. Henrik Wergeland; 4. Turisten; 5. Udvandreren	Norway: 1. Homeward; 2. To the Motherland; 3. Henrik Wergeland; 4. The Shepherdess; 5. The Emigrant	for voice and piano; words by John Paulsen
Vocal	Op. 59	1893–1894	Elegiske Digte: 1. Når jeg vil dø 2. På Norges nøgne fjelde 3. Til Én I 4. Til Én II; 5. Farvel; 6. Nu hviler du i jorden	Elegiac Poems: 1. Autumns Farewell; 2. The Pine Tree; 3. To Her I 4. To Her II; 5. Good-bye; 6. Your Eyes Are Closed Forever	for voice and piano; words by John Paulsen
Vocal	Op. 60	1893–1894	Digte: 1. Liden Kirsten; 2. Moderen synger 3. Mens jeg venter 4. Der skreg en fugl 5. Og jeg vil ha mig en hjertenskjær	Poems: 1. Little Kirsten; 2. The Mother's Lament; 3. On the Water; 4. A Bird Cried Out; 5. Midsummer Eve	for voice and piano; words by Vilhelm Krag
Vocal	Op. 61	1894	Barnlige Sange: 1. Havet; 2. Sang til Juletræet; 3. Lok; 4. Fiskervise; 5. Kveldsang for Blakken; 6. De norske fjelde 7. Fædrelandssalme	Children's Songs: 1. The Ocean; 2. The Christmas Tree; 3. Farmyard; 4. Fisherman's Song; 5. Good-night Song for Dobbin; 6. The Norwegian Mountains; 7. Hymn of the Fatherland	for voice and piano; Norwegian translations by Nordahl Rolfsen; 1. words by Nordahl Rolfsen; 2. words by Johan Krohn; 3. words by Bjørnstjerne Bjørnson; 4. words by Petter Dass; 5. words by Nordahl Rolfsen; 6. words by Nordahl Rolfsen; 7. words by Johan Ludvig Runeberg
Vocal	EG 151	1894?	Fædrelandssang	National Song	for voice and piano; words by John Paulsen
Piano	Op. 62	1895	Lyriske stykker, hefte VII: 1. Sylphe; 2. Takk; 3. Fransk Serenade; 4. Bækken; 5. Drømmesyn; 6. Hjemad	Lyric Pieces, Book VII: 1. Sylph; 2. Gratitude; 3. French Serenade; 4. Brooklet; 5. Phantom; 6. Homeward	
Orchestral	Op. 63	1895	To nordiske melodier: 1. I folketonestil 2. Kulok og Stabbelåten	2 Nordic Songs: 1. In Folk Style; 2. Cattle Call and Peasant Dance	for string orchestra; also transcribed for piano
Piano	Op. 63	1895	To nordiske melodier: 1. I folketonestil 2. Kulok og Stabbelåten	2 Nordic Songs: 1. In Folk Style; 2. Cattle Call and Peasant Dance	original for string orchestra
Choral	EG 173	1895	Kristianiensernes Sangerhilsen		for baritone and male chorus; words by Jonas Lie
Vocal	EG 152	1895–?	Sanger fra Haugtussa som ikke er med i opus 67: 1. Prolog; 2. Veslemøy ved rokken 3. Kvelding; 4. Sporven; 5. Fyrevarsel; 6. I slåtten 7. Veslemøy undrast 8. Dømd; 9. Den snilde guten 10. Veslemøy lengtar 11. Skog-glad; 12. Ku-lok	Haugtussa, Songs Not Included in Opus 67: 1. Prologue; 2. Veslemøy at the Spinning Wheel; 3. Evening; 4. The Sparrow; 5. Warning; 6. In the Hayfield; 7. Veslemøy Wondering; 8. Doomed; 9. The Nice Boy; 10. Veslemøy Longing; 11. Forest Joy; 12. Cow Call	for voice and piano; words by Arne Garborg
Orchestral	Op. 64	1896–1898	Symfoniske Danser: 1. Allegro moderato e marcato 2. Allegretto grazioso 3. Allegro giocoso 4. Andante - Allegro molto e risoluto	Symphonic Dances	
Piano	Op. 65	1896	Lyriske stykker, hefte VIII: 1. Fra Ungdomsdagene; 2. Bondens Sang; 3. Tungsind; 4. Salon; 5. I Balladetone; 6. Bryllupsdag på Troldhaugen	Lyric Pieces, Book VIII: 1. From Early Years; 2. Peasant's Song; 3. Melancholy; 4. Salon; 5. Ballad; 6. Wedding Day at Troldhaugen	
Vocal	EG 145	1896	Blåbæret	The Blueberry	for voice and piano; words by Didrik Grønvold
Vocal	EG 153	1896	Jeg elsker	I Loved Him	for voice and piano; words by Bjørnstjerne Bjørnson
Choral	EG 174	1896	Jædervise		for male chorus; words by Jonas Dahl
Choral	EG 175	1896	Impromptu til Griegs Mandskor i Fort Dodge, Iowa	Impromptu to Grieg Men's Chorus in Fort Dodge, Iowa	for male chorus; words by Bjørnstjerne Bjørnson
Piano	Op. 66	1896	19 norske folkeviser: 1. Kulok; 2. Det er den største Dårlighed; 3. En Konge hersked i Østerland; 4. Siri Dale Visen; 5. Det var i min Ungdom; 6. Lok og bådnlåt 7. Bådnlåt; 8. Lok; 9. Liten va Guten; 10. Morgo ska du få gifta deg 11. Det stander to Piger; 12. Ranveig; 13. En liten grå Man; 14. I Ola-dalom, i Ola-Kjønn; 15. Bådnlåt; 16. Ho vesle Astrid vor 17. Bådnlåt; 18. Jeg går i tusind Tanker; 19. Gjendines Bådnlåt	19 Norwegian Folk Songs: 1. Cattle Call; 2. It Is the Greatest Folly; 3. A King Ruled in the East; 4. A Song of Siri Dale; 5. It Was in My Youth; 6. Cattle Call and Lullaby; 7. Lullaby; 8. Cattle Call; 9. Small Was the Lad; 10. Tomorrow You Shall Marry Her; 11. There Stood Two Girls; 12. Ranveig; 13. A Little Gray Man; 14. In Ola Valley, in Ola Lake; 15. Lullaby; 16. Our Little Astrid; 17. Lullaby; 18. I Wander Deep in Thought; 19. Gjendine's Lullaby	
Vocal	Op. 67	1895–1898	Haugtussa: 1. Det syng 2. Veslemøy; 3. Blaabærli; 4. Møte; 5. Elsk; 6. Killingdans; 7. Vond Dag; 8. Ved Gjætle-Bekken	The Mountain Maid: 1. The Enticement; 2. Veslemøy; 3. Blueberry Slope; 4. The Tryst; 5. Love; 6. Kidlings' Dance; 7. Hurtful Day; 8. At the Brook	for voice and piano; words by Arne Garborg; see also EG 152
Piano	Op. 68	1898	Lyriske stykker, hefte IX: 1. Matrosernes Opsang; 2. Bedstemors Menuet; 3. For dine Føtter; 4. Aften på Højfjeldet; 5. Bådnlåt; 6. Valse mélancolique	Lyric Pieces, Book IX: 1. Sailors' Song; 2. Grandmother's Minuet; 3. At Your Feet; 4. Evening in the Mountains; 5. At the Cradle; 6. Valse mélancolique	Nos. 4 and 5 orchestrated
Orchestral	Op. 68	1898–1899	To lyriske stykker: 1. Aften på Højfjeldet; 2. Bådnlåt	2 Lyric Pieces: 1. Evening in the Mountains; 2. At the Cradle	for string orchestra with oboe and horn; original for piano
Piano	EG 110; EG 111; EG 112	1898	Tre klaverstykker: 1. Hvite skyer 2. Tusseslått; 3. Dansen går	3 Piano Pieces: 1. White Clouds; 2. Gnomes' Tune; 3. The Dance Goes On	edited by Julius Röntgen
Vocal	Op. 69	1900	Fem Digte: 1. Der gynger en Baad paa Bølge; 2. Til min Dreng; 3. Ved Moders Grav; 4. Snegl, Snegl!; 5. Drømme	5 Poems: 1. A Boat on the Waves is Rocking; 2. To my Son; 3. At Mother's Grave; 4. Snail, Snail; 5. Dreams	for voice and piano; words by Otto Benzon
Vocal	Op. 70	1900	Fem Digte: 1. Eros; 2. Jeg lever et Liv i Længsel; 3. Lys Nat; 4. Se dig for, naar du vælger din Vej; 5. Digtervise	5 Poems: 1. Eros; 2. Summernight; 3. A life of Longing; 4. Walk with Care; 5. A Poet's Song	for voice and piano; words by Otto Benzon
Vocal	EG 154	1900	Til en hunndjevel	To a Devil	for voice and piano; words by Otto Benzon
Vocal	EG 155	1900?	Julens vuggesang	Yuletide Cradle Song	for voice and piano; words by Adolf Langsted
Vocal	EG 156	1900	Gentlemen-menige	Gentleman Rankers	for voice and piano; words by Rudyard Kipling
Piano	Op. 71	1901	Lyriske stykker, hefte X: 1. Der var engang 2. Sommeraften (Sommerkvæld); 3. Småtrold; 4. Skovstilhed; 5. Halling; 6. Forbi; 7. Efterklang	Lyric Pieces, Book X: 1. Once Upon a Time; 2. Summer's Eve; 3. Puck; 4. Peace of the Woods; 5. Halling; 6. Gone; 7. Remembrances	
Choral	EG 168	1901	Inga Litamor	Inga Litamor	for baritone and male chorus; based on a folk melody from Eksingedalen
Choral	EG 176	1901	Til Ole Bull	To Ole Bull	for male chorus; words by Johan Sebastian Welhaven
Piano	Op. 72	1902–1903	Slåtter (Norske bondedanse): 1. Gibøens Bruremarsch; 2. John Væstafæs Springdans; 3. Bruremarsch fra Telemarken; 4. Haugelåt; 5. Prillaren fra Os Præstegjeld; 6. Gangar; 7. Røtnamsknut; 8. Bruremarsch (efter Møllarguten); 9. Nils Rekves halling 10. Knut Luråsens halling I 11. Knut Luråsens halling II; 12. Springdans (efter Møllarguten); 13. Håvar Gibøens Draum; 14. Tussebrurefæra på Vossevangen; 15. Skuldalsbruri; 16. Kivlemøyerne (Springdans); 17. Kivlemøyerne (Gangar)	Norwegian Peasant Dances: 1. Giböen's Bridal March; 2. John Væstafæ's Spring Dance; 3. Bridal March from Telemark; 4. Halling from the Hills (Tune from the Fairy Hill); 5. Prillar from the Church Play "Os" (Tune for the Goat-horn); 6. Gangar; 7. Røtnamsknut; 8. Bridal March (after Myllarguten); 9. Nils Rekve's Halling; 10. Knut Luråsen's Halling I 11. Knut Luråsen's Halling II; 12. Spring Dance; 13. Håvar Giböen's Dream on the Oterholts Bridge; 14. The Goblin's Bridal Procession at Vossevangen; 15. The Bride of Skuldal; 16. The Girls from Kivledal (Spring Dance); 17. The Girls from Kivledal (Gangar)	Hardanger fiddle tunes arranged for piano
Piano	Op. 73	1901–1905	Stemninger: 1. Resignation; 2. Scherzo-Impromptu; 3. Nattligt Ridt; 4. Folketone; 5. Studie (Hommage à Chopin); 6. Studenternes Serenade; 7. Lualåt	Moods: 1. Resignation; 2. Scherzo-Impromptu; 3. Night Ride; 4. Folk Song; 5. Study (Hommage à Chopin); 6. Students' Serenade; 7. The Mountaineer's Song	
Vocal	EG 157	1905	Jaegeren (Der Jäger)	The Hunter	for voice and piano; words by Wilhelm Schultz
Choral	Op. 74	1906	4 Salmer fritt efter gamle norske Kirkemelodier: 1. Hvad est du dog skjøn 2. Guds Søn har gjordt meg fri 3. Jesus Christus er opfaren 4. I Himmelen	4 Psalms after Old Norwegian Church Melodies	for baritone and mixed chorus 1. words by Hans Adolf Brorson; 2. words by Hans Adolf Brorson; 3. words by Hans Thomissøn after Martin Luther; 4. words by Laurentius Laurentii Laurinus
Vocal			Dulgt kjærlighet	Hidden Love	for voice and piano; alternate version; edited version as Op. 39 No. 2
Vocal			1. Kjærlighed; 2. Soldaten; 3. Claras sang 4. Langelandsk folkemelodi 5. Solnedgang	5 Songs Dedicated to Louis Hornbeck: 1. Love; 2. The Soldier; 3. Clara's Song; 4. Folksong from Langeland; 5. Sunset	1. edited version as Op. 15 No. 2; 2. edited version as EG 125; 3. edited version as EG 124; 4. edited version as Op. 15 No. 3; 5. edited version as Op. 9 No. 3
Concertante				Concerto for violin and orchestra	sketches only
Vocal			Det første møte	The First Meeting	for voice and orchestra; arrangement of Op. 21 No. 1
Stage			Frieriet paa Helgoland	The Proposal at Helgoland	lost
Orchestral			Klokkeklang	The Sound of the Bells	for orchestra; arrangement of Op. 54 No. 6
Vocal			Møte	The Tryst	for voice and piano; alternate version; edited version as Op. 67 No. 4
Chamber music			Strykekvartett i d-moll	String Quartet in D minor	for 2 violins, viola and cello; lost
Orchestral			Symfoni nr. 2 I foraar	Symphony No. 2 In Spring	sketches only
Orchestral			Å Ola, Ola min egen onge	O Ola, My Own Dear Boy	partially lost; EG 133 No. 4 arranged for orchestra
