= Bläserklasse =

Bläserklasse ("blowing class") is a musical education class which specialises in wind instruments, i.e. the woodwinds and brass. All students usually spend at least 2 years studying an instrument, with the class forming a wind orchestra made up of an amalgamation of woodwind and brass instruments.

== See also ==
- Grieg's music in popular culture
