= Bust of Edvard Grieg =

Bronze bust by Finn Frolich in Seattle, Washington, US

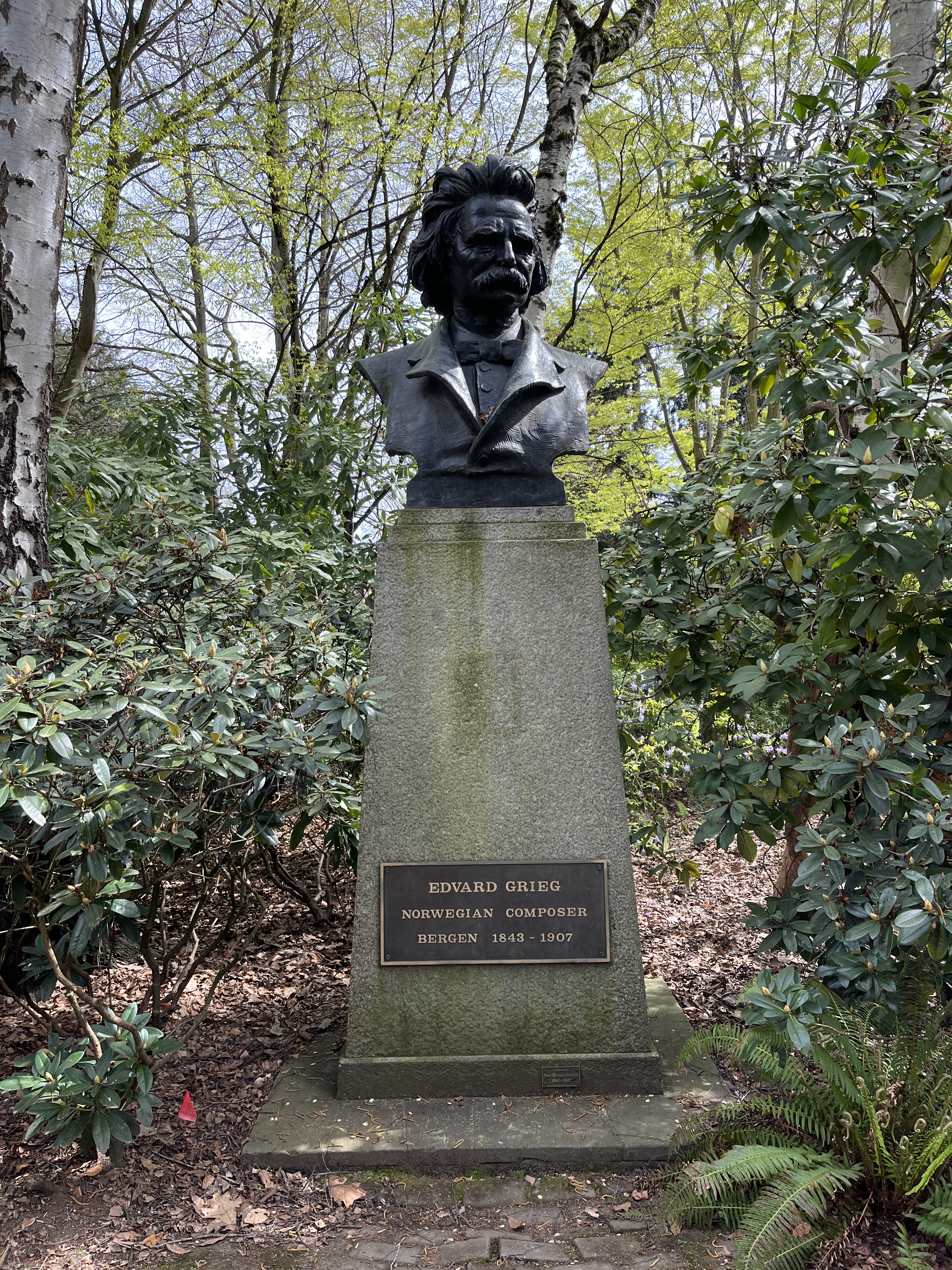
- The sculpture in 2024
- Artist: Finn Frolich
- Medium: Bronze
- Subject: Edvard Grieg
- Location: Seattle; 47°39′23″N 122°18′22″W

A bronze bust of Edvard Grieg by Finn Frolich is installed in Grieg Garden on the University of Washington campus in Seattle's University District, in the U.S. state of Washington.

== See also ==
- Campus of the University of Washington
