= Holberg Suite =

1884 suite by Edvard Grieg

Orchestral version
1. Praeludium

2. Sarabande

3. Gavotte-Musette-Gavotte

4. Air

5. Rigaudon
Performed by the chamber orchestra of the United States Marine Band, 2013

The Holberg Suite, Op. 40, (Norwegian: Fra Holbergs tid (From Holberg's Time)), subtitled "Suite i gammel stil" ("Suite in olden style"), is a suite of five movements based on eighteenth-century dance forms, written by Edvard Grieg in 1884 to celebrate the 200th anniversary of the birth of Dano-Norwegian humanist playwright Ludvig Holberg (1684–1754).

It exemplifies nineteenth-century music which makes use of musical styles and forms from the preceding century. Although not as famous as Grieg's incidental music from Peer Gynt, which is itself usually performed as arranged in a pair of suites, many critics regard the works as of equal merit.

== Background ==
The Holberg Suite was originally composed for the piano in September 1884, but a year later was adapted by Grieg himself for string orchestra. The suite consists of an introduction and a set of dances. It is an early essay in neoclassicism, an attempt to echo as much as was known in Grieg's time of the music of Holberg's era.

The work was premiered on 15 March 1885 in Bergen.

The French premiere was on 22 April 1894 at an all-Grieg concert at the Concerts Colonne, conducted by Grieg himself.

== Structure ==
The movements of the suite are:

Piano version
1. Praeludium

2. Sarabande

3. Gavotte

4. Air

5. Rigaudon
digital piano capture

1. Praeludium (Allegro vivace)
2. Sarabande (Andante)
3. Gavotte (Allegretto)
4. Air (Andante religioso)
5. Rigaudon (Allegro con brio)

== Piano version and string orchestration ==
"The music is thought out most idiomatically for both forces." However, the version for string orchestra differs in a number of respects from the solo piano original. The "Praeludium" in the piano version opens with a series of arpeggios. The orchestral version replaces these with chords repeated in a dactylic rhythm.

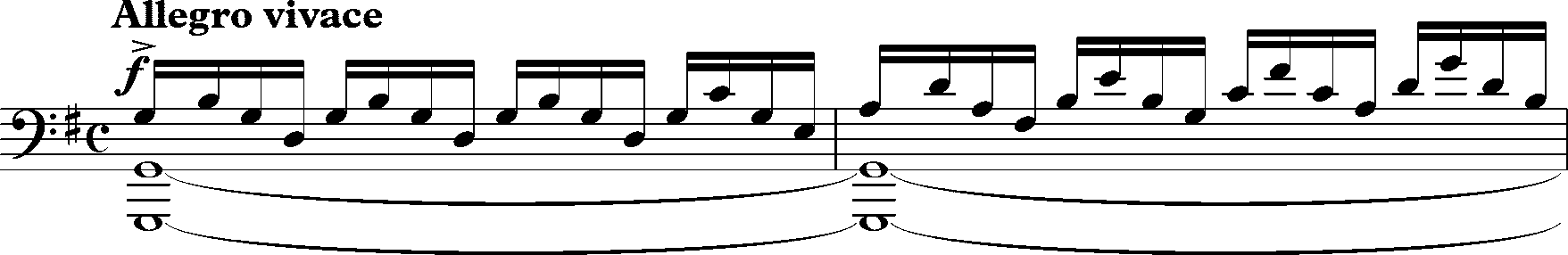
"Praeludium", bars 1 and 2 piano version

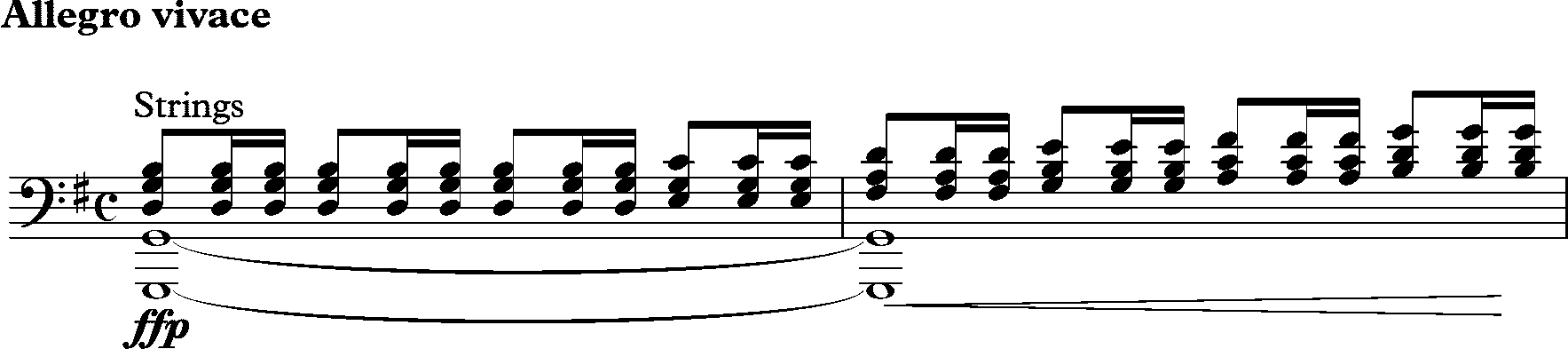
"Praeludium", bars 1 and 2 string version

Another striking transformation occurs in bars 31 to 34 of the "Praeludium". Grieg's orchestration develops this into a series of chords played by divisi violins. To this he adds a new counterpoint consisting of scales played pizzicato on violas.

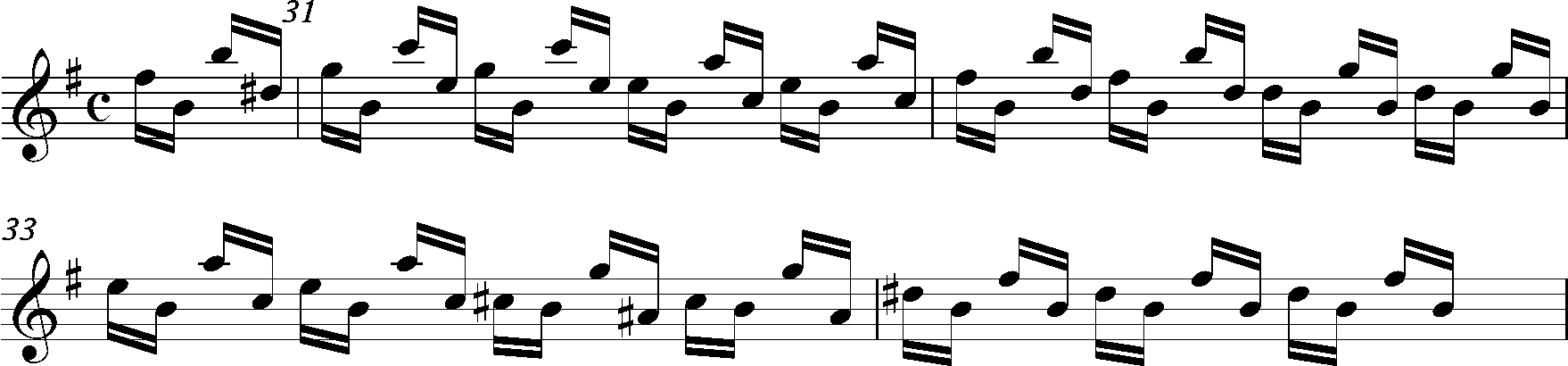
"Praeludium", bars 31 to 34 piano version

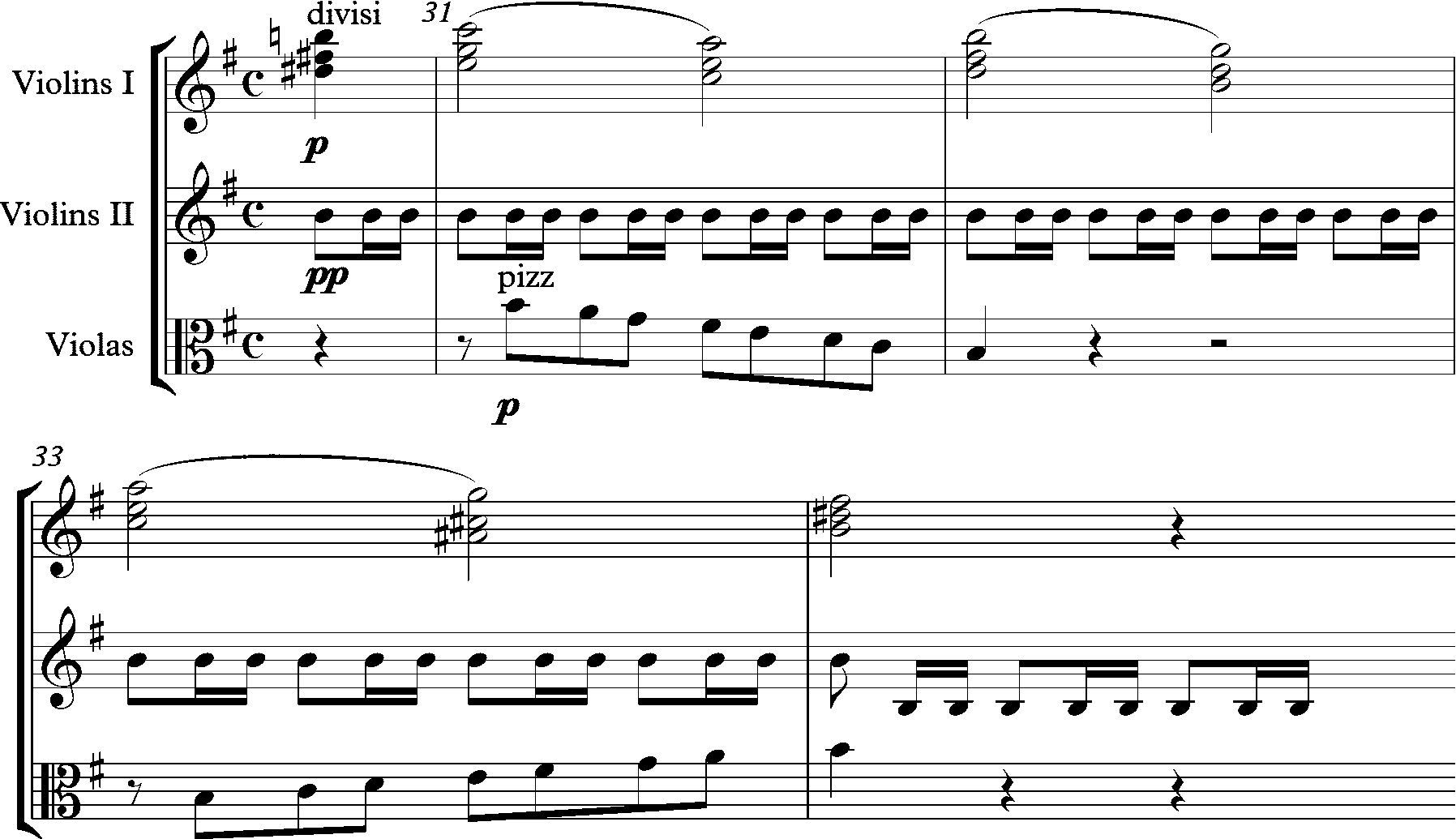
"Praeludium", bars 31 to 34 string version
