= Morning Mood =

Orchestral piece by Edvard Grieg

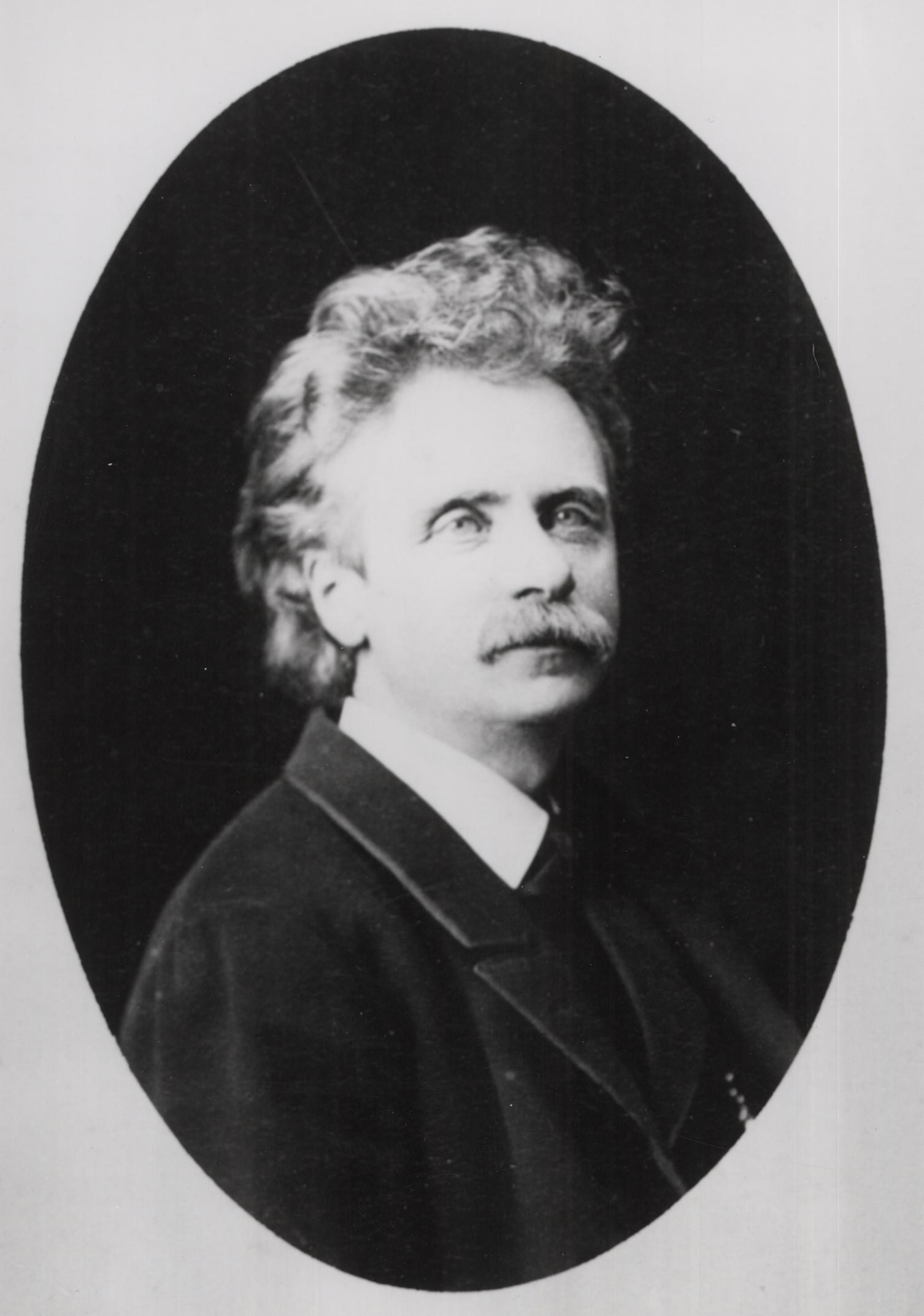
Edvard Grieg ca. 1870

"Morning Mood" (Norwegian: Morgenstemning), commonly referred to simply as "Morning", is part of Edvard Grieg's Peer Gynt, Op. 23, written in 1875 as incidental music to Henrik Ibsen's play of the same name, and was also included as the first of four movements in Peer Gynt Suite No. 1, Op. 46.

== Music ==
"Morning Mood"
Czech National Symphony Orchestra

Written in E major, the melody uses the pentatonic scale and alternates between flute and oboe. Unusually, the climax occurs early in the piece at the first forte which signifies the sun breaking through. The time signature is 6/8 and the tempo instruction is Allegretto pastorale. It is orchestrated for flutes, oboes, clarinets, bassoons, horns, trumpets, timpani, and string section. A performance takes about four minutes.

== Setting ==
The piece depicts the rising of the sun during act 4, scene 4, of Ibsen's play, which finds Peer Gynt stranded in the Moroccan desert after his companions took his yacht and abandoned him there while he slept. The scene begins with the following description: "Dawn. Acacias and palm trees. Peer [Gynt] is sitting in his tree using a wrenched-off branch to defend himself against a group of monkeys."

As the Peer Gynt suites take their pieces out of the original context of the play, "Morning Mood" is not widely known in its original setting, and images of Grieg's Scandinavian origins more frequently spring to the minds of its listeners than those of the desert it was written to depict.

== See also ==
- Grieg's music in popular culture
