= In the Hall of the Mountain King =

Orchestral piece by Edvard Grieg

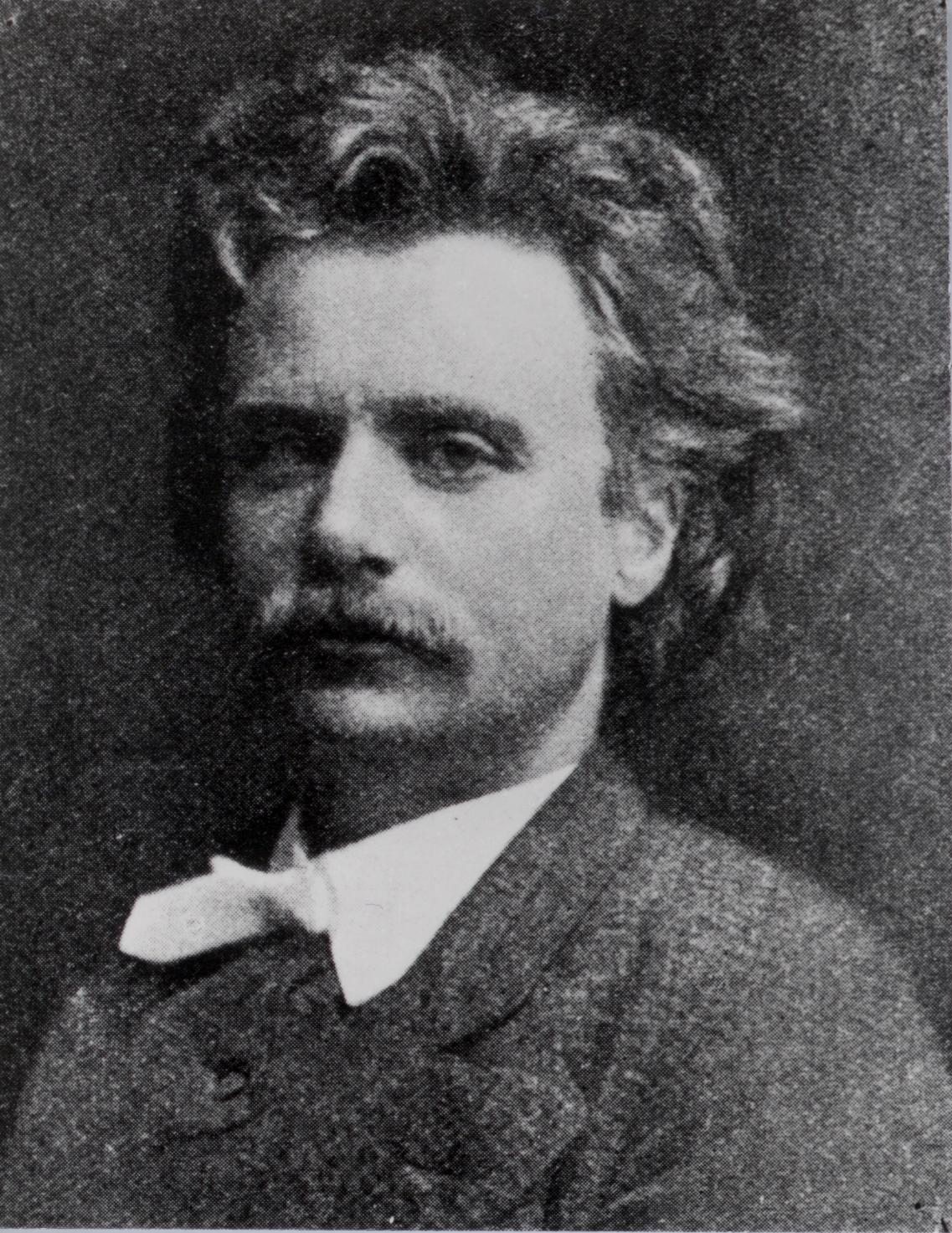
Edvard Grieg ca. 1870

"In the Hall of the Mountain King" (Norwegian: "I Dovregubbens hall", lit. 'In the hall of the old man of Dovre') is a piece of orchestral music composed by Edvard Grieg in 1875 as incidental music for the sixth scene of act 2 in Henrik Ibsen's 1867 play Peer Gynt. It was originally part of Opus 23 but was later extracted as the final piece of Peer Gynt, Suite No. 1, Op. 46. Its easily recognizable theme has helped it attain iconic status in popular culture, where it has been arranged by many artists (see Grieg's music in popular culture).

The English translation of the name is not literal. Dovre is a mountainous region in Norway, and gubbe translates into "(old) man" or "husband". Gubbe is used along with its female counterpart kjerring to differentiate male and female trolls, trollgubbe and trollkjerring. In the play, Dovregubben is a troll king that Peer Gynt invents in a fantasy.

== Setting ==
The two-phrase theme, written in the key of B minor

"In the Hall of the Mountain King"
Performed by the Czech National Symphony Orchestra

The piece is played as the title character Peer Gynt, in a dream-like fantasy, enters "Dovregubbens (the troll Mountain King's) hall". The scene's introduction continues: "There is a great crowd of troll courtiers, gnomes and goblins. Dovregubben sits on his throne, with crown and sceptre, surrounded by his children and relatives. Peer Gynt stands before him. There is a tremendous uproar in the hall." The lines sung are the first lines in the scene.

Grieg himself wrote, "For the Hall of the Mountain King, I have written something that so reeks of cowpats, ultra-Norwegianism, and 'to-thyself-be-enough-ness' that I cannot bear to hear it, though I hope that the irony will make itself felt." The theme of "to thyself be... enough" – avoiding the commitment implicit in the phrase "To thine own self be true" and just doing enough – is central to Peer Gynt's satire, and the phrase is discussed by Peer and the mountain king in the scene which follows the piece.

== Music ==
Modified theme in F♯ major

The piece is in the overall key of B minor. The simple theme begins slowly and quietly in the lowest registers of the orchestra, played first by the cellos, double basses, and bassoons. After being stated, the main theme is then very slightly modified with a few different ascending notes, but transposed up a perfect fifth (to the key of F-sharp major, the dominant key, but with flattened sixth) and played on different instruments.

The two groups of instruments then move in and out of different octaves until they eventually "collide" with each other at the same pitch. The tempo gradually speeds up to a prestissimo finale, and the music itself becomes increasingly loud and frenetic.

== Lyrics of the song in Peer Gynt ==
Character	Norwegian	English
The troll-courtiers:	Slagt ham! Kristenmands søn har dåret Dovregubbens veneste mø! Slagt ham! Slagt ham!	Slay him! The Christian man's son has seduced the fairest maid of the Mountain King! Slay him! Slay him!
A troll-imp:	Må jeg skjære ham i fingeren?	May I hack him on the fingers?
Another troll-imp:	Må jeg rive ham i håret?	May I tug him by the hair?
A troll-maiden:	Hu, hej, lad mig bide ham i låret!	Hu, hey, let me bite him in the haunches!
A troll-witch with a ladle:	Skal han lages til sod og sø?	Shall he be boiled into soup and broth?
Another troll-witch, with a butcher knife:	Skal han steges på spid eller brunes i gryde?	Shall he roast on a spit or be browned in a stewpan?
The Mountain King:	Isvand i blodet!	Ice-water to your blood!

== Cultural impact ==
- D. W. Griffith's The Birth of a Nation (1915) used the song to build up to the Union attack on Atlanta. The song had by that time already been used in film scores, whether for Ibsen's play or other works; yet the popularity of Griffith's film helped to establish it in the American popular imagination.
- "In the Hall of the Mountain King" plays a major plot point in Fritz Lang's early sound film M (1931). Peter Lorre's character of child killer Hans Beckert whistles the tune whenever he is overcome with the urge to commit murder. However, Lorre himself could not whistle – it is actually Lang who is heard. The film was one of the first to use a leitmotif, associating "In the Hall of the Mountain King" with the Lorre character. Later in the film, the mere sound of the song lets the audience know that he is nearby, off-screen. This association of a musical theme with a particular character or situation, a technique borrowed from opera, became a staple in film.
- British instrumental rock band Nero and the Gladiators had a number 48 hit with "In the Hall of the Mountain King" on the UK Top 50 singles chart in 1961.
- British rock band the Who recorded a performance of "In the Hall of the Mountain King" in 1967. This version went unreleased until 1995, when it appeared as a bonus track on a CD reissue of The Who Sell Out. Tucson Weekly called this cover a "Who-freakout arrangement". One reviewer called the Who's version the "weirdest of these" covers on the CD, and says it is "a rendition of the corresponding extract from Grieg's Peer Gynt suite ... [yet] it hardly sounds like Grieg here, anyway...". Another says that "the main function of the composition is to evoke thoughts of (naturally) King Crimson and (unnaturally) Pink Floyd, because in parts it sounds exactly like 'Interstellar Overdrive'".
- The theme music for the 1980s American children's cartoon show Inspector Gadget, composed by Shuki Levy, was inspired by "In the Hall of the Mountain King".
- In the 1981 animated series The Smurfs, classical music pieces were often included in the soundtrack, including "In the Hall of the Mountain King".
- In the 1993 animated series Adventures of Sonic the Hedgehog, a rendition of "In the Hall of the Mountain King" appears as part of the show's opening theme and as a recurring leitmotif.
- Britain's largest theme park, Alton Towers, have used "In the Hall of the Mountain King" as a central musical identity to the park since 1992.
- In the film The Social Network (2010), an electronic arrangement of the song made by composers Trent Reznor and Atticus Ross is played as the Winklevoss twins lose their rowing competition in the UK.
- The piece is sampled in Ashnikko's 2021 single "Halloweenie IV: Innards".
- In the 2020s, the guitarist of American punk rock band The Offspring, Noodles, regularly began doing live solo performances of "In the Hall of the Mountain King" at their concerts.

== Notes ==
Sources

- Ibsen, Henrik (1985) [1876]. Peer Gynt. Translated by Peter Watts. Penguin.
