= Cello Sonata (Grieg) =

1882-1883 composition for cello and piano by Edvard Grieg

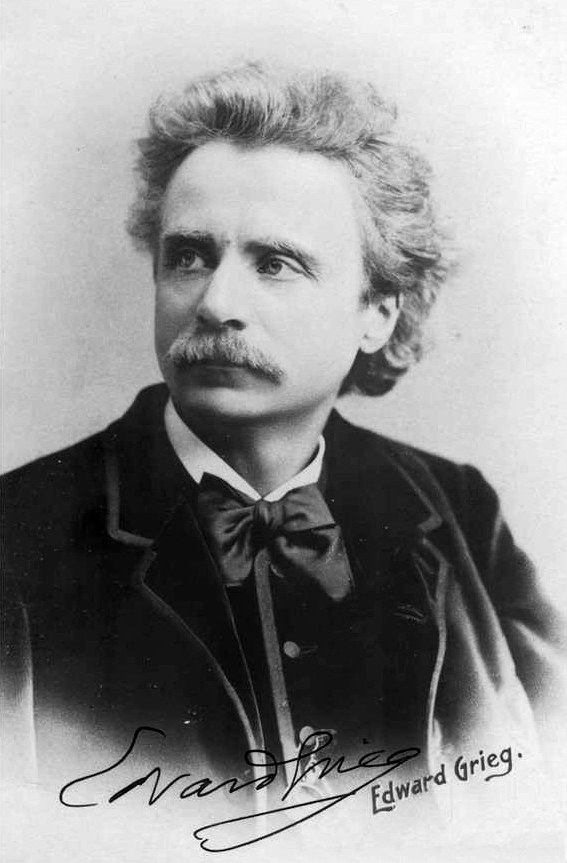
Portrait of Edvard Grieg from 1888

Edvard Grieg composed the Cello Sonata in A minor, Op. 36 for cello and piano, and his only work for this combination, in 1882–83, marking a return to composition following a period when he had been preoccupied with his conducting duties at the Bergen Symphony Orchestra as well as illness.

The work borrows themes from Grieg's own Trauermarsch zum Andenken an Richard Nordraak (Funeral March in Memory of Rikard Nordraak) and the wedding march from his Drei Orchesterstücke aus Sigurd Jorsalfar (Three orchestral pieces from 'Sigurd Jorsalfar'). Grieg dedicated the piece to his brother, John, a keen amateur cellist. Friedrich Ludwig Grützmacher premièred the work with Grieg at the piano on 22 October 1883 in Dresden.

== Structure ==
The sonata has three movements:

1. Allegro agitato
2. Andante molto tranquillo
3. Allegro molto e marcato

The work takes approximately 26 minutes to perform.

== Arrangements ==
- Violin and Piano arrangement by the composer, 1884
- Gary Karr and Joseph Horovitz arranged the sonata as a double bass concerto on his album Virtuoso Double Bass.
- Joseph Horovitz and Benjamin Wallfisch orchestrated the sonata as a cello concerto.
