= Edvard Grieg's music in popular culture =

The music of the Norwegian composer Edvard Grieg has been used extensively in media, music education, and popular music.

== Music education ==
Norway organized a 1993 celebration for the 150th anniversary of Grieg's birth, including "Grieg in the Schools", with programs for children from pre-school to secondary school. The programs were repeated in Germany in 1996, where over a thousand students participated in Grieg in der Schule. Grieg observances spanned 39 countries, from Mexico to Russia.

Further celebrations of Grieg and his music were held in 2007, the 100th anniversary of his death. Bosnia and Herzegovina held a large-scale celebration, featuring Peer Gynt and the Piano Concerto in a public concert for children and adults. The July 2007 Australasian Piano Pedagogy Conference featured Grieg's works.

Bergen University College, and later, the University of Bergen both named their tertiary music departments Griegakademiet (the Grieg Academy), in the composer's honor.

His legacy is physically preserved through numerous public monuments, including a prominent bronze statue by Ingebrigt Vik at Bergen's City Park and a commemorative bust at the Bergen Philharmonic Orchestra's Grieg Hall.

== Peer Gynt ==
In 1960 Duke Ellington recorded a jazz interpretation of Peer Gynt in his Swinging Suites by Edward E. and Edward G. album. This led to conflict in Norway between the Grieg Foundation and its supporters, who found the recordings offensive to Norwegian culture, and Norwegian supporters of Ellington. Ellington's versions were withdrawn from distribution in the country until 1967, when Grieg's copyrights expired.

=== "Morning" ===
Jay and the Americans recorded a rock and roll cover version known as "Dawning", in 1962. "Morning" was later used in the 1973 film Soylent Green as part of the music selected by Edward G. Robinson's character to listen to as he lay dying.

In 1998, The Simpsons episode "Bart Carny" paid homage to its use in older cartoons in a sequence where a cheeseburger unwraps in the early sunlight. Later in the same year, German musical project In-Mood feat. Juliette sampled the theme for their song "Ocean of Light." Zelda Nomura, female antagonist of the animated series Trollhunters: Tales of Arcadia, whistles "Morning Mood" and "In the Hall of the Mountain King" to instill fear in her enemies.

The song plays in an episode of Pop Team Epic, when Popuko wakes up. However, upon seeing it is still nighttime, she beats up the song caption. The song plays during the reveal trailer "Kled: The Reunion" for the character Kled for the videogame League of Legends. The beginning portion was used in a Cartoon Network sign-on from 2013 to 2015, where the titular character from one of CN's shows, Uncle Grandpa, appears with his head rising against a mountain range background, saying his trademark catchphrase, "Good morning!". In the sign-off, the character would say the catchphrase, and lower back down with the music playing (albeit reversed) and then him saying the catchphrase again.

The "Morning Mood" theme in the first movement of Grieg's Peer Gynt Suite no 1, Op 46 is used as the opening theme music in PopCap Games' 2007 video game Peggle, accompanying the animation of a rising sun. The song plays as background music in the video game Grow a Garden.

=== "Solveig's Song" ===
"Solveig's Song" is used as the melodic basis for a track in Vandal Hearts 2, 1999.

Power metal/Progressive metal band Kamelot based a song called "Forever" on the melody of "Solveig's Song". This is also mentioned by their now previous singer Roy Khan, on their live DVD One Cold Winters Night.

== Piano Sonata in E minor ==
The motion picture The First Legion uses Grieg's Piano Sonata in E minor as a way to introduce a Jesuit priest's prayer. The priest, Father Fulton, plays the sonata as a way of connecting himself to the other Jesuits, when "forced to revise their standards of belief after experiencing first a makeshift and later a 'real' miracle."

== "Brothers, Sing On!" ==
The folk song "Brothers, Sing On!" ("Sangerhilsen" in the original Norwegian) was written by Grieg, with lyrics by Sigvald Skavlan and with English language lyrics by Herbert Dalmas and/or Howard McKinney. The Mohawk-Hudson Male Chorus Association (MHMCA) presented "Brothers, Sing On!": a massed concert with 90 male singers at the historic Troy Savings Bank Music Hall on May 3, 2008, with the titular song adopted as the organization's theme song in 1974. They had previously performed the same song in the same venue in 2002.

The University of Northern Iowa has named its website and starts every concert with this song. Their Glee Club states on their website:

If there was just one song that could be sung, in a true spirit of peace and brotherhood, "Brothers, Sing On!" by Edvard Grieg would be it. "Brothers, Sing On!" is the timeless gem in many men's choral repertoire. It has been called the 'international anthem' of men's choral singing.

== Other pieces ==
The 1944 musical Song of Norway, based very loosely on Grieg's life and using his music, was created in 1944 by Robert Wright and George Forrest; and a film version was released in 1970.

The 1990’s show Twin Peaks used the introduction of Piano Concerto in A Minor in episode “Double Play”. The episode was directed by Uli Edel.

The 1957 made-for-TV movie musical The Pied Piper of Hamelin uses Grieg's music almost exclusively, with "In the Hall of the Mountain King" being the melody that the Piper (Van Johnson) plays to rid the town of rats.

The opening theme of the first movement of Grieg's Piano Concerto in A Minor was used by Jimmy Wisner, recording under the name "Kokomo", in the song "Asia Minor", a top-ten pop hit in the U.S. in 1961.

Eric Morecambe famously played "all the right notes, but not necessarily in the right order" of Grieg's Piano Concerto in a sketch on the 1971 Morecambe and Wise Christmas special that featured Andre Previn.

== See also ==
- List of compositions by Edvard Grieg
- Neo-Medieval
- Grieg Academy
