= Ballade in the Form of Variations on a Norwegian Folk Song =

Large-scale work for piano by Edvard Grieg

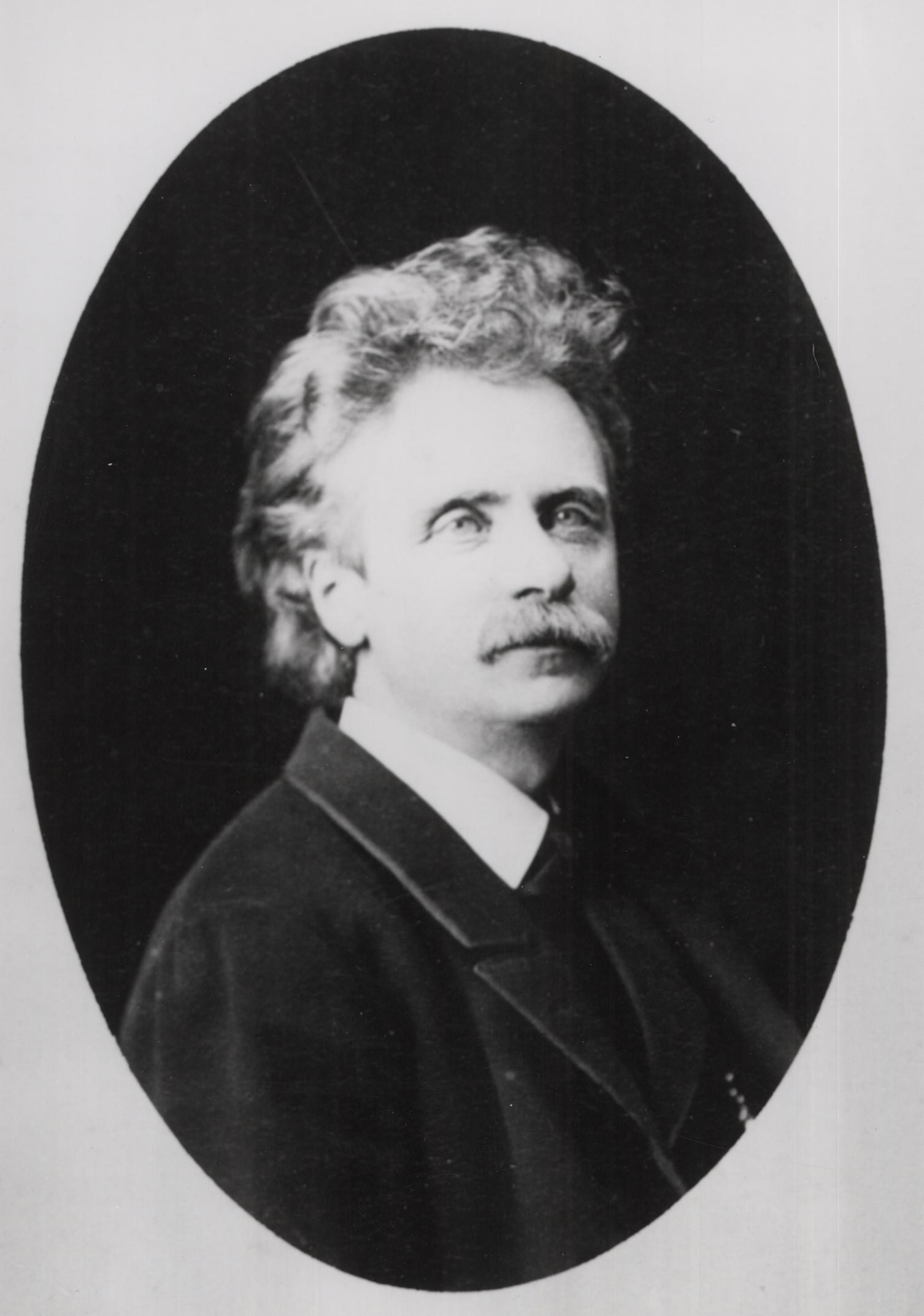
Edvard Grieg ca. 1870

Ballade in the Form of Variations on a Norwegian Folk Song in G minor, Op. 24, is a large-scale work for piano by Edvard Grieg. It is in the form of theme and variations, the theme being the Norwegian folk song Den nordlanske bondestand (The Northland Peasantry in English). A performance usually lasts around 20 minutes.

- Theme. The theme is first introduced in 3/4 time. It is marked andante espressivo. The theme is haunting and sad, and has much lyrical beauty.
- Variation I. The first variation marked poco meno andante, ma molto tranquillo, introduces the harmonic chord pattern in triplets.
- Variation II. The second variation branches off the first and is marked allegro agitato. The time signature changes to 9/8. This variation requires much virtuosity, having daring jumps in the left hand. The chord patterns are the same as the first variation.
- Variation III. The third variation in contrast to the preceding agitato, is a calm adagio marked molto espressivo. It is a slow movement that introduces a new melody very similar to the theme, but darker. The time changes back to 3/4.
- Variation IV. The fourth variation is a lively allegro capriccioso. It consists of brisk descending chromatic sixteenth notes, with chords in the left hand, still resembling the harmonic changes in the theme.
- Variation V. The fifth variation, marked più lento, is unlike the rest of the piece. It consists of huge, but slow, arpeggios followed by a variation of the theme. This variation produces an intense feeling of sorrow and loneliness.
- Variation VI. The sixth variation marked allegro scherzando, is a technically difficult variation based on jumping chords passing from hand to hand. Still the chord progressions are the same as the theme.
- Variation VII. The seventh variation is the same as the sixth, but more sustained, and instead of chords, arpeggios, but still in the same fashion of passing from hand to hand.
- Variation VIII. The eighth variation is marked lento, and is another form of the theme melody played in chords.
- Variation IX. The ninth variation is marked un poco andante, and is perhaps the most creative of the variations. It is similar to the eight, but more agitated, and does not have the same hypnotic flow.
- Variation X. The tenth variation starts the buildup to the climax with an un poco allegro e alla burla tempo. It is a light scherzando section. 3/4 changes to 12/8.
- Variation XI. The eleventh variation marked piu animato is a fast preparatory variation, still leading to the coda.
- Variation XII. The twelfth variation is marked meno allegro e maestoso, and is a huge grand variation of con tutta forza, with massive chords and repeats the melody heard in the third variation, only in a grand major voice. The key changes to g major, and the time from 12/8 to 6/8.
- Variation XIII. The thirteenth variation, marked allegro furioso, is the final buildup to the huge climax. It consists of virtuosic arpeggiated chords, and octaves flying all over the keyboard. The key and time signature revert to the original G minor and 3/4.
- Variation XIV. The final variation, fourteen, is a huge prestissimo. The theme is pounded in fast octave chords, and climbs up the keyboard. Ends with a low e flat octave, marked lunga with a fermata.
- Coda. The theme is finally closed, with a flashback of the first 8 measures, and closes with a G minor chord.

The Ballade was one of the works played by Percy Grainger at his 1901 London debut at Steinway Hall. This was four years before he met Grieg, who was to become Grainger's greatest champion.

The Norwegian composer Geirr Tveitt made an arrangement of the Ballade for orchestra, which, thought to be lost for several years, was found in the early 1990s.
