= In Autumn =

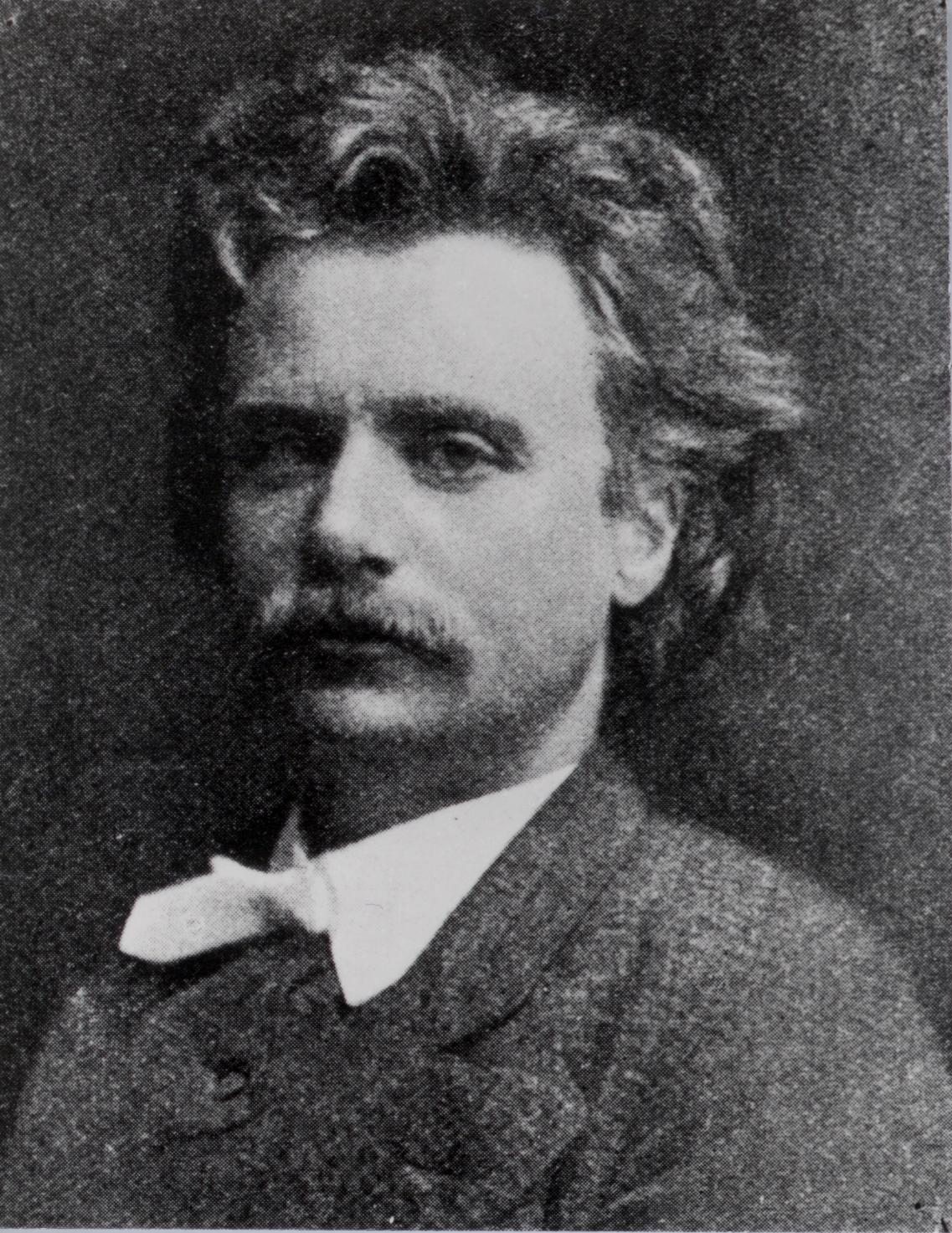
Edvard Grieg ca. 1870

In Autumn, Op. 11, is a concert overture written by Edvard Grieg in 1865.

== History ==
On a visit to Copenhagen, Grieg showed his overture to Niels Gade, who told him: "This is trash, Grieg; go home and write something better." So he arranged it as a piano duet and sent it to a competition at the Swedish Academy, judged by Gade and others. This form won first prize and was published in Stockholm.

== Instrumentation ==
The overture is scored for one piccolo, two flutes, two oboes, two clarinets, two bassoons, four horns, two trumpets, three trombones, one bass tuba, three timpani, one bass drum, two cymbals, one triangle and one string section.

== Analysis ==
The opening Andante in D major starts with chords played by the orchestra contrasting with a sunny woodwind theme. The tension slowly builds to a D minor Allegro section in sonata form. The orchestra takes up the main theme in D minor taken from a song entitled "Autumn Storm." After the main theme, we hear a secondary theme in F major. The development brings the return of previous themes through a series of restless modulations. After a slower section for horn and strings, the recapitulation brings the return of the main themes. The overture concludes with a triumphant reprise of the opening woodwind theme.

== Recordings ==
- Maurice Abravanel conducting the Utah Symphony Orchestra. Recorded in 1975 and released in 1992 by Vox.
- Sir Thomas Beecham conducting the Royal Philharmonic Orchestra. Recorded in 1955 and released in 1999 by EMI Classics.
- Neeme Järvi conducting the Gothenburg Symphony Orchestra. Recorded in 1988 and released in 1989 by Deutsche Grammophon.
- Okko Kamu conducting the Gothenburg Symphony Orchestra. Recorded in 1981 and released in 1994 by Bis.
- Ole Kristian Ruud conducting the Bergen Philharmonic Orchestra. Recorded in 2002 and released in 2003 by BIS Records.
