= Violin Sonatas (Grieg) =

Group of works by Edvard Grieg

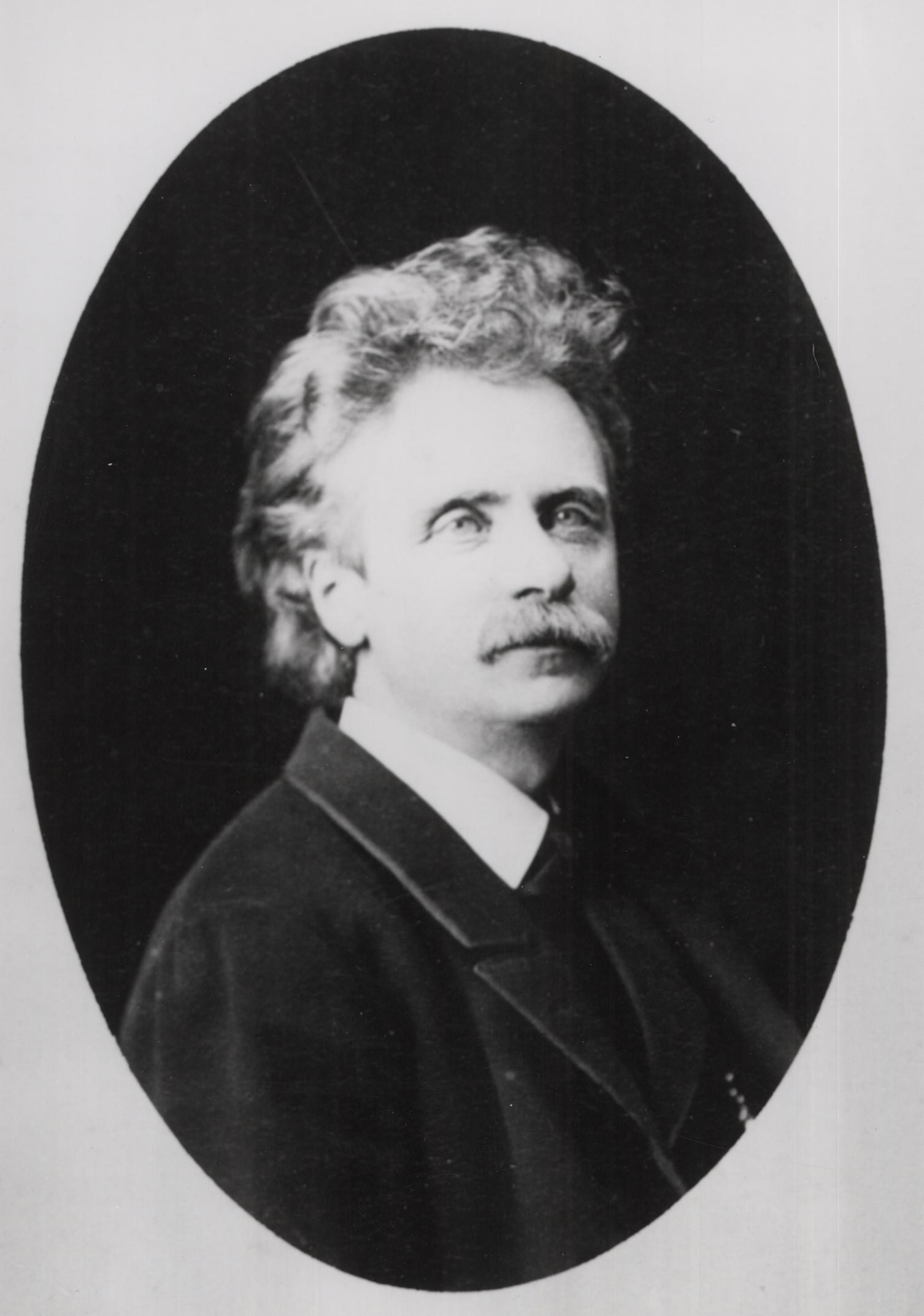
Edvard Grieg ca. 1870

Norwegian composer Edvard Grieg wrote three violin sonatas. The sonatas are all examples of his musical nationalism, since they all contain references or similarities to Norwegian folk song. Grieg wrote the sonatas between 1865 and 1887.

- Violin Sonata No. 1 in F major, Op. 8 was written in Copenhagen in 1865.
- Violin Sonata No. 2 in G major, Op. 13 was written in Oslo (then Christiania) in 1867.
- Violin Sonata No. 3 in C minor, Op. 45 was completed while Grieg was living in Troldhaugen in 1887.

== Violin Sonata No. 1 in F major, Op. 8 ==
Grieg composed this sonata in the summer of 1865 while on holiday with Benjamin Feddersen in Rungsted, Denmark, near Copenhagen. The piece was composed shortly after his only piano sonata was completed that same summer.

Concerning the piece, Norwegian composer Gerhard Schjelderup commented: it is "the work of a youth who has seen only the sunny side of life." Despite this, many sections of the work are quite dark and turbulent.

The sonata has three movements:

1. Allegro con brio
2. Allegretto quasi andantino
3. Allegro molto vivace

The violin's opening theme in the first movement:

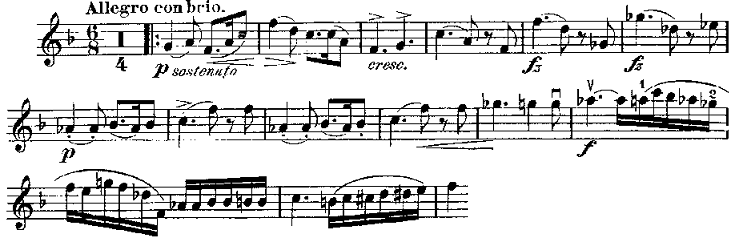

== Violin Sonata No. 2 in G major, Op. 13 ==
This sonata was dedicated to Norwegian composer and violinist Johan Svendsen.

On the second sonata, Schjelderup remarked: it is "the gift to the world of a man who has also shivered in the cold mists of night." Also, due to the sonata's tragic qualities, he considered the piece more Norwegian than the first sonata and "a Norway without tragedy is not a complete Norway."

When Grieg presented the sonata to his teacher Niels Gade, he proclaimed the work "too Norwegian" and professed that his next sonata should be less Norwegian. Grieg, reportedly, in defiance claimed that his next sonata would be even more Norwegian.

=== I. Lento doloroso — Poco allegro — Allegro vivace — Presto ===
Introduction (G minor)

1st theme (G major)

2nd theme (B minor)

3rd theme (D major)

=== II. Allegretto tranquillo ===
Theme (E minor)

=== III. Allegro animato ===
1st theme (G major to D major)
2nd theme (E♭ major)

== Violin Sonata No. 3 in C minor, Op. 45 ==
Grieg began composing his third and final violin sonata in the autumn of 1886. Whereas the first two sonatas were written in a matter of weeks, this sonata took him several months to complete.

The sonata remains the most popular of the three works, and has established itself in the standard repertoire. The work was also a personal favorite of Grieg's. The sonata premiered with Grieg himself at the piano with well-known violinist Adolph Brodsky in Leipzig. To a certain extent, Grieg built on Norwegian folk melodies and rhythms in this three-movement sonata. However, Grieg considered the second sonata as the "Norwegian" sonata, while the third sonata was "the one with the broader horizon."

This was the last piece Grieg composed using sonata form.

=== I. Allegro molto ed appassionato – Presto ===
The first movement is characterized by its bold and heroic introduction. The agitated opening theme is contrasted with a lyrical second theme.

First Theme (C minor)

Transition theme (C minor to G major)

Second theme (E♭ major)

=== II. Allegretto espressivo alla Romanza – Allegro molto – Tempo I ===
The second movement opens with a serene piano solo in E major with a lyrical melodic line. In the middle section, Grieg uses a playful dance tune. The second movement also exists in a version for cello and piano that Grieg composed during the same time as the violin version. The cello version was given to his brother as a birthday gift in May 1887, but appeared in print only in 2005 (by Henle).

1st theme (E major)

2nd theme (E minor)

=== III. Allegro animato – Con fuoco – Cantabile – Tempo I – Con fuoco – Prestissimo (Doppio movimento) ===
The finale is written in sonata form with a coda but lacks a development section.

1st theme (C minor)

2nd theme (A♭ major)
