= Piano Sonata (Grieg) =

Piano sonata by Edvard Grieg

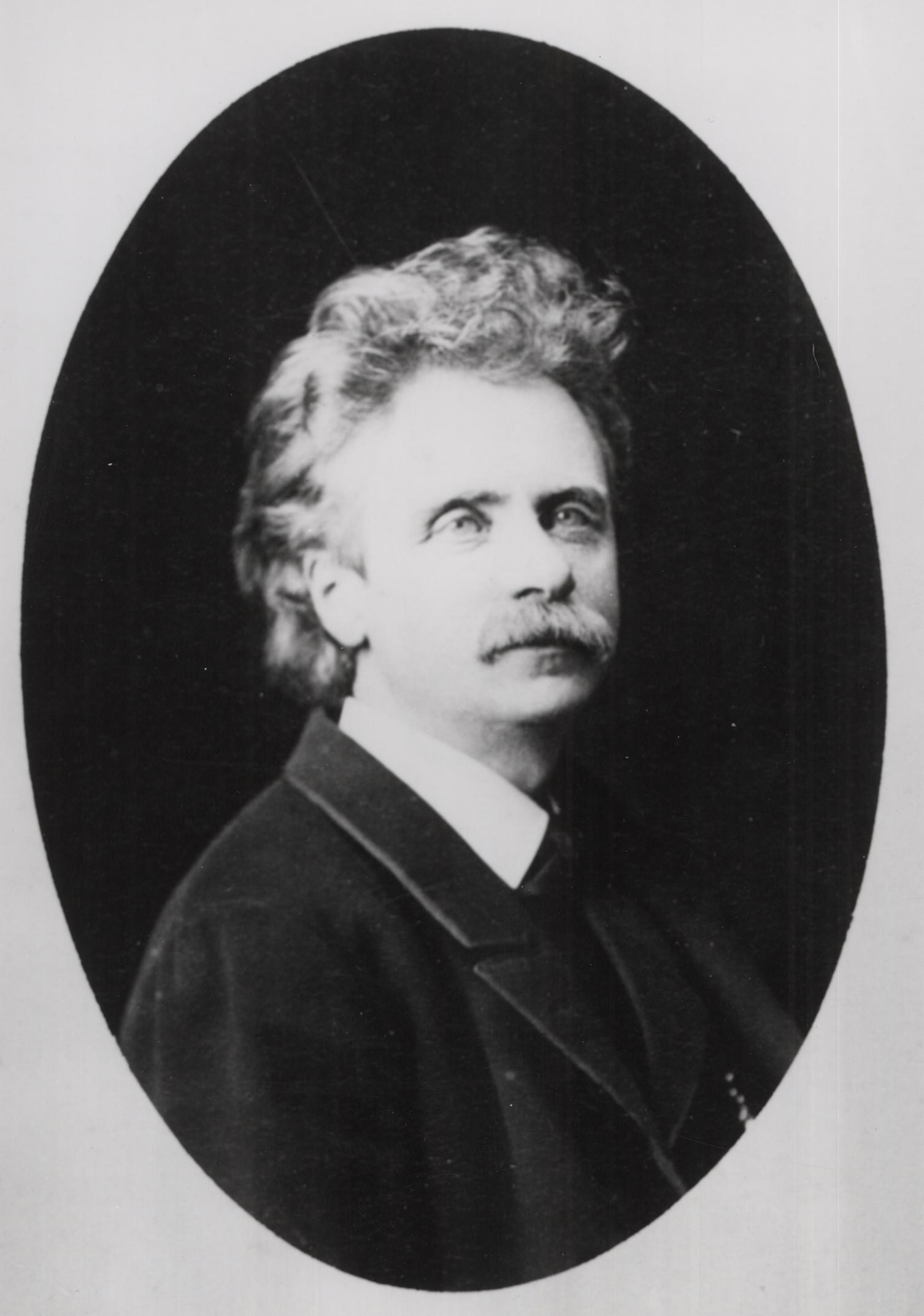
Edvard Grieg ca. 1870

Edvard Grieg's Piano Sonata in E minor, Op. 7 was written in 1865 when he was 22 years old. The sonata was published a year later and revised in 1887. The work was Grieg's only piano sonata and it was dedicated to the Danish composer Niels Gade. The sonata has four movements with the following tempo markings:

1. Allegro moderato
2. Andante molto
3. Alla Menuetto, ma poco più lento
4. Finale: Molto allegro

A typical performance lasts around 20 minutes.

In the first movement Grieg used a technique probably most famously used by J.S. Bach and Shostakovich: his own name, more precisely his initials E–H–G (H being the German name for note B), begins the melody in the first two bars, which is reiterated in octaves and even echoed by the left hand in bars 14 and 15. He used the same method in his two compositions of the Lyric Pieces: "Gade", Op. 57, No. 2 and "Secret", Op. 57, No. 4, using the name of his admired colleague Gade.

In a 1944 letter to Ella Grainger, Percy Grainger mentioned planning to orchestrate the sonata. He apparently did so, but only a sketch is extant. However, an orchestration of the Menuetto by Danish composer Robert Henriques exists.

== Recordings ==
In 1903, Grieg recorded two movements of his sonata.

The first complete recording was that made on 20 April 1921 by the Australian pianist Una Bourne (1882–1974).

Later pianists to record the Sonata in E minor include Glenn Gould, Alicia de Larrocha and Eva Knardahl. Leslie Howard has recorded it on a disc of Four Scandinavian Piano Sonatas.
