= Funeral March in Memory of Rikard Nordraak =

Piece by Edvard Grieg written in commemoration of a fellow composer

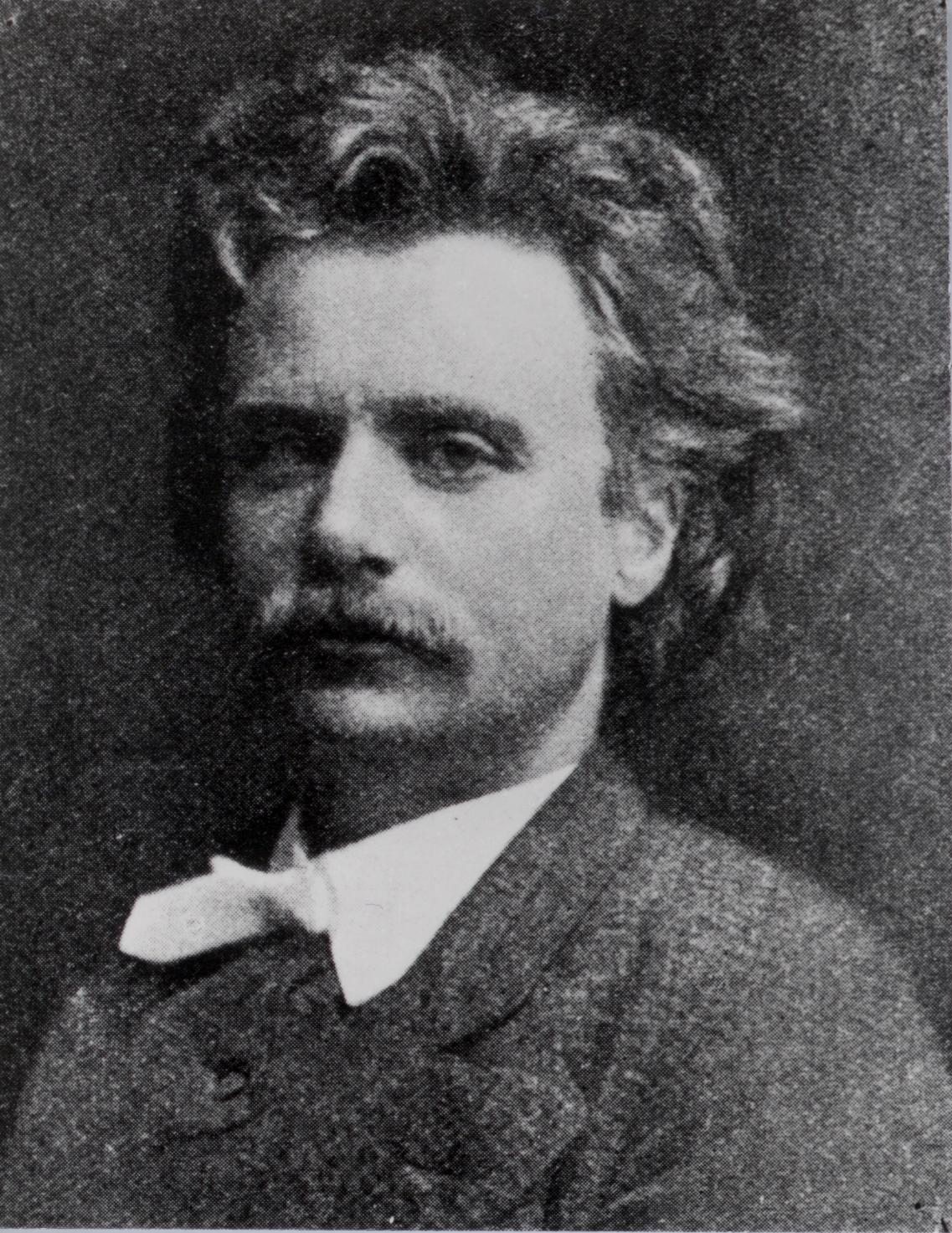
Edvard Grieg ca. 1870

Edvard Grieg composed his Funeral March in Memory of Rikard Nordraak in 1866, in honour of his friend and fellow Norwegian composer Rikard Nordraak, who had died in March of that year at the age of 23. Grieg deeply respected his fellow musician and took no delay in producing the work. The funeral march was originally written as a piano piece in A minor; Grieg also produced transcriptions of it for brass choir and wind band, in B♭ minor.

Grieg valued the work greatly, bringing it along on all of his travels. In one letter he made it clear that he wished the piece to be played at his own funeral, "as best as possible." It was played, in an orchestration by Johan Halvorsen, Grieg's friend, colleague and nephew-in-law.

The work has a few arrangements by later musicians, including one by Geoffrey Emerson. It lasts six to eight minutes, depending on the arrangement and tempo.
