= Peer Gynt (Grieg) =

Incidental music by Edvard Grieg to Ibsen's play

- Incidental music and Suites by Edvard Grieg
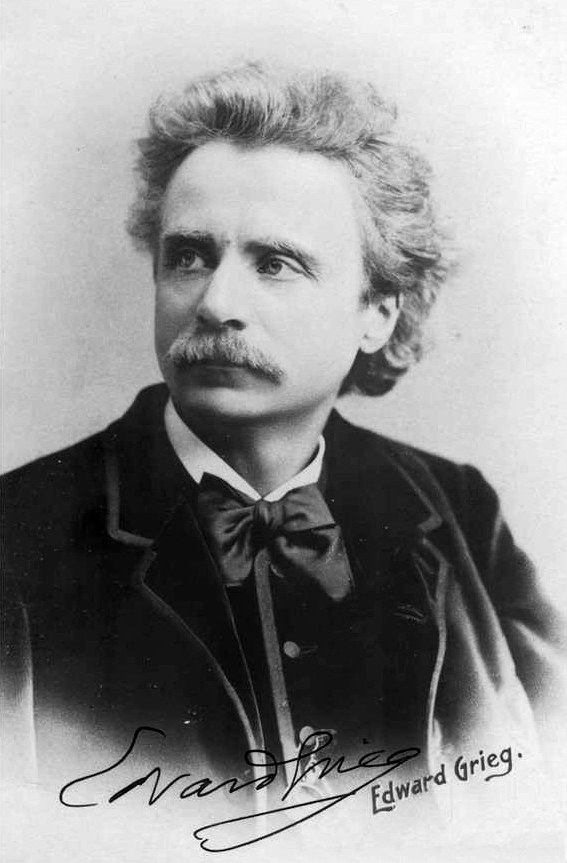
- Photograph of Grieg, 1888
- Opus: 23; 46 (Suite No. 1); 55 (Suite No. 2)
- Text: from Ibsen's Peer Gynt
- Composed: 1875
- Performed: 24 February 1876 Oslo
- Scoring: SATB soloists and choir; orchestra

Peer Gynt, Op. 23, is the incidental music to Henrik Ibsen's 1867 play Peer Gynt, written by the Norwegian composer Edvard Grieg in 1875. It premiered along with the play on 24 February 1876 in Christiania (now Oslo). Grieg later created two suites from his Peer Gynt music. Some of the music from these suites has received coverage in popular culture.

== Background ==
Edvard Grieg (1843–1907) was one of the definitive leaders of Scandinavian music. Although he composed many short piano pieces and chamber works, the work Grieg did for this play by Ibsen stood out. Originally composing 90 minutes of orchestral music for the play, he later went back and extracted certain sections for the suites. Peer Gynt's travels around the world and distant lands are represented by the instruments Grieg chooses to use.

When Ibsen asked Grieg to write music for the play in 1874, he reluctantly agreed. However, it was much more difficult for Grieg than he imagined, as he wrote to a friend:

"Peer Gynt" progresses slowly, and there is no possibility of having it finished by autumn. It is a terribly unmanageable subject.

— Edvard Grieg (August 1874)

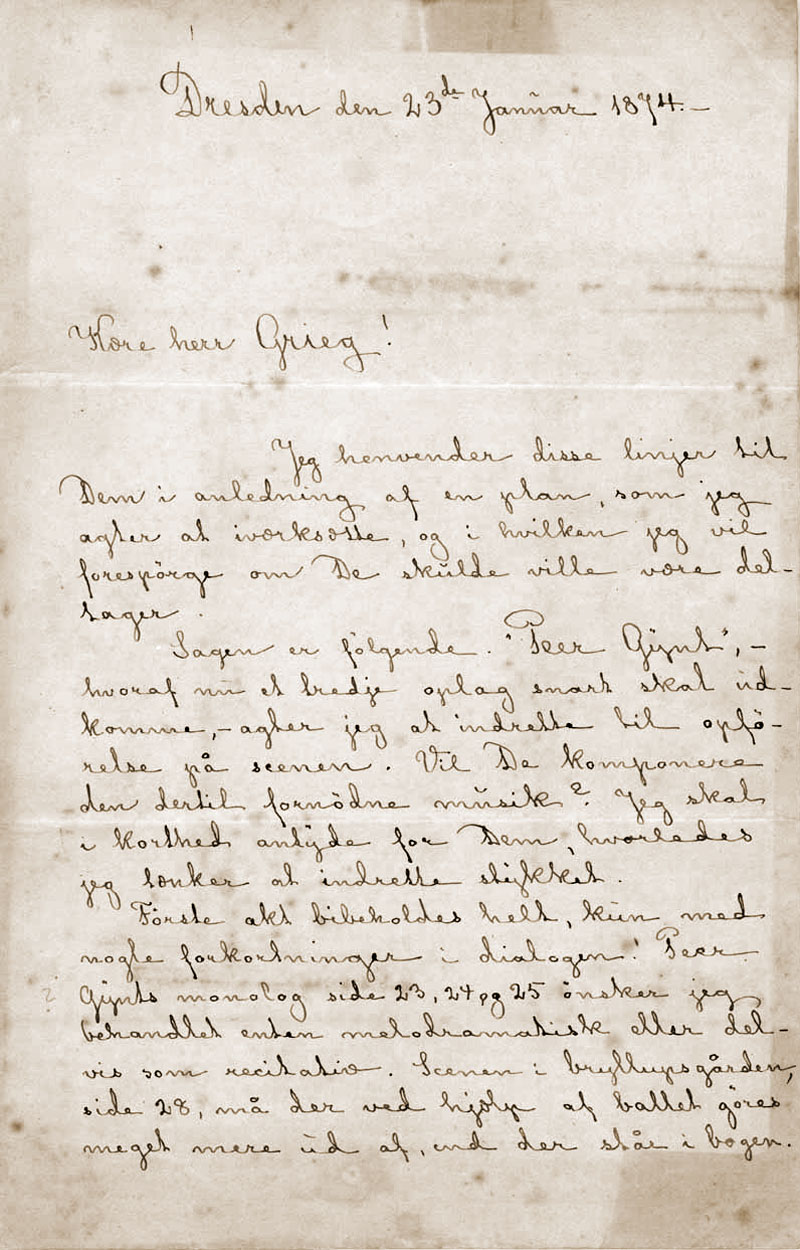
Letter from Henrik Ibsen to Grieg, January 23, 1874.

Nina Grieg, his wife, wrote of Edvard and his music:

The more he saturated his mind with the powerful poem, the more clearly he saw that he was the right man for a work of such witchery and so permeated with the Norwegian spirit.

Even though the premiere was a "triumphant success", it prompted Grieg to complain bitterly that the Swedish management of the theatre had given him specifications as to the duration of each number and its order:

I was thus compelled to do patchwork... In no case had I opportunity to write as I wanted... Hence the brevity of the pieces.

For many years, the suites were the only parts of the music that were available, as the original score was not published until 1908, one year after Grieg's death, by Johan Halvorsen.

== Original score, Op. 23 ==
Various recordings have been made of this music. Some recordings that claim to contain the complete incidental music have 33 selections; the recording conducted by Ole Kristian Ruud is split into 49 items. Both recordings include several verses from the drama, read by actors.

The original score contains 26 movements: Movements indicated in bold were extracted by Grieg into two suites.

- Act I
  - Prelude: At the Wedding (I brudlaupsgarden)
  - The Bridal Procession (Brudefylgjet dreg forbi)
  - Halling (Halling)
  - Springar (Springdans)
- Act II
  - Prelude: **The Abduction of the Bride. Ingrid's Lament** (Bruderovet / Ingrids klage)
  - Peer Gynt and the Herd-Girls (Peer Gynt og seterjentene)
  - Peer Gynt and the Woman in Green (Peer Gynt og den grønkledde)
  - By His mount You Shall Judge Him (På ridestellet skal storfolk kjennes)
  - **In the Hall of the Mountain King** (I Dovregubbens hall)
  - Dance of the Mountain King's Daughter (Dans av Dovregubbens datter)
  - Peer Gynt hunted by the trolls (Peer Gynt jages av troll)
  - Peer Gynt and the Boyg (Peer Gynt og Bøygen)
- Act III
  - Prelude: Deep in the Forest (Dypt Inne I Barskogen)
  - **Solveig's Song** (Solvejgs sang)
  - **The Death of Åse** (Åses død)
- Act IV
  - Prelude: **Morning Mood** (Morgenstemning)
  - The Thief and the Receiver (Tjuven og heilaren)
  - **Arabian Dance** (Arabisk dans)
  - **Anitra's Dance** (Anitras dans)
  - Peer Gynt's Serenade (Peer Gynts serenade)
  - Peer Gynt and Anitra (Peer og Anitra)
  - Solveig's Song (Solvejgs sang)
- Act V
  - Prelude: **Peer Gynt's Homecoming** (Peer Gynts heimfart)
  - Shipwreck (Skipsforliset)
  - Day Scene
  - Solveig sings in the hut (Solvejg syngjer i hytta)
  - Night Scene (Nattscene)
  - Whitsun Hymn (Pinsesalme)
  - Solveig's Cradle Song (Solvejgs vuggevise)

The complete score of the incidental music includes several songs and choral pieces. The complete score was believed to be lost until the 1980s and has been performed in its entirety only since then. (See the article on Ibsen's play for a list of notable productions, including concert performances of the incidental music.)

It was originally orchestrated for: one piccolo, two flutes, two oboes, two clarinets in A, two bassoons, four horns in E, two trumpets in E, three trombones, a tuba, timpani, cymbals, bass drum, snare drum, triangle, xylophone, tambourine, tam-tam, bell, piano, organ, harp, and strings.

== Suites ==
Over a decade after composing the full incidental music for Peer Gynt, Grieg extracted eight movements to make two four-movement suites. The Peer Gynt suites are among his best-known works, although they began as incidental compositions. Suite No. 1, Op. 46 was published in 1888, and Suite No. 2, Op. 55 was published in 1893. A typical rendition of both suites lasts 20 to 35 minutes.

=== Suite No. 1, Op. 46 ===
1. Morning Mood

2. The Death of Åse

3. Anitra's Dance

4. In the Hall of the Mountain King
Performed by the Czech National Symphony Orchestra

1. Morning Mood (Morgenstemning) (E major)
2. The Death of Åse (Åses død) (B minor)
3. Anitra's Dance (Anitras dans) (A minor)
4. In the Hall of the Mountain King (I Dovregubbens hall) (B minor)

=== Suite No. 2, Op. 55 ===
1. The Abduction of the Bride. Ingrid's Lament (Bruderovet. Ingrids klage) (G minor)
2. Arabian Dance (Arabisk dans) (C major)
3. Peer Gynt's Homecoming (Stormy Evening on the Sea) (Peer Gynts hjemfart (Stormfull aften på havet)) (F-sharp minor) – Compared to the one in the Peer Gynt Incidental Music (Op. 23), Grieg added an extra coda that ended this movement with an imperfect cadence in A minor.
4. Solveig's Song (Solveigs sang) (A minor)

Originally, the second suite had a fifth number, The Dance of the Mountain King's Daughter, but Grieg withdrew it.
