= Bergen International Festival =

Music and culture festival in Bergen, Norway

Bergen International Festival Festspillene i Bergen
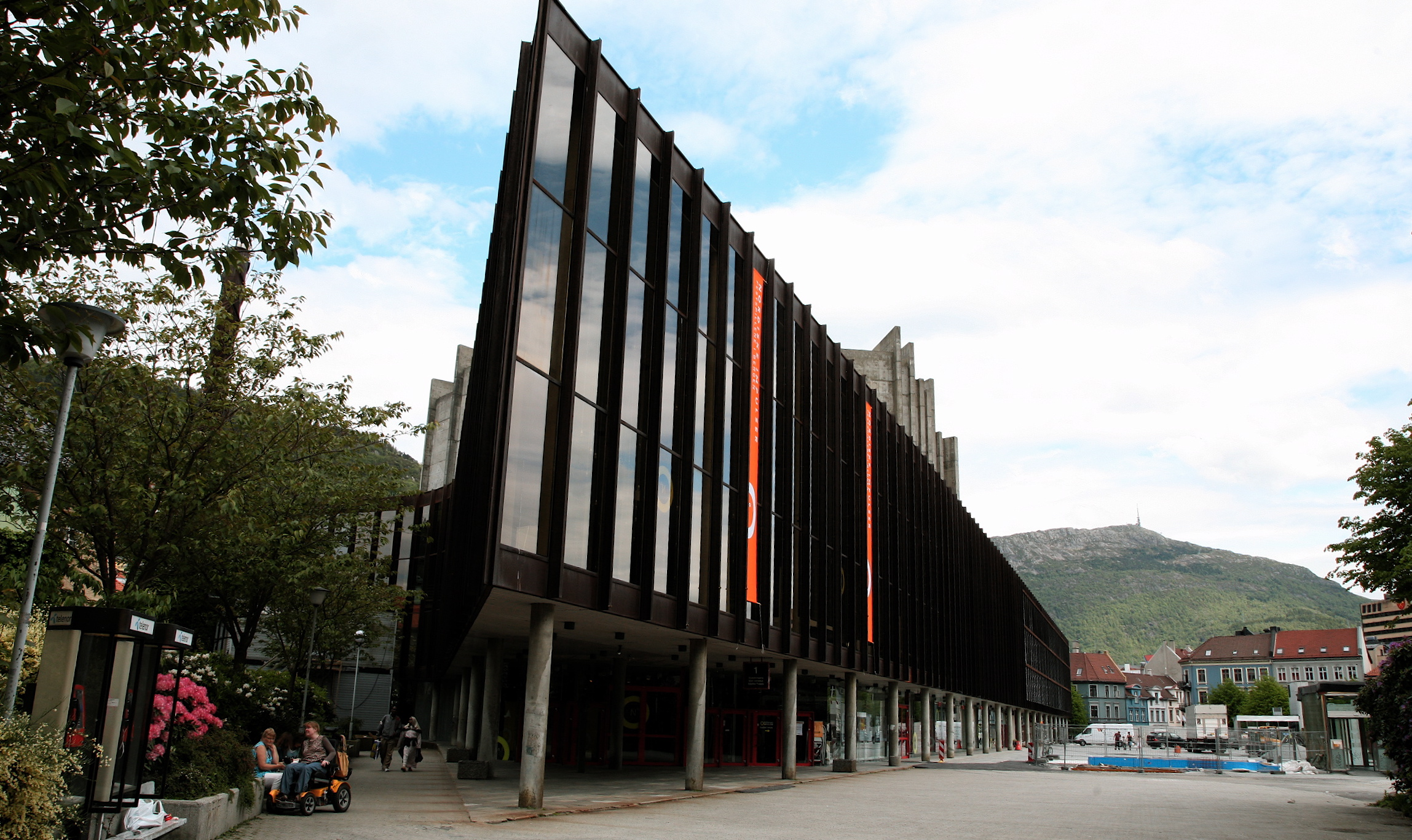
- Grieghallen
- Status: Active
- Genre: Music Festival
- Date: May–June
- Begins: 22 May 2024
- Ends: 5 June 2024
- Frequency: Annually
- Location: Bergen
- Country: Norway
- Years active: 1953–
- Inaugurated: Founded 1952
- Founder: Frank Meidell Falch; Christen Gran Bøgh
- Patron: King Harald V of Norway
- Website: www.fib.no/en

Bergen International Festival (Norwegian: Festspillene i Bergen) is an annual international music and cultural festival in Bergen, Norway.

In Spring 2022, Lars Petter Hagen took over as festival director.

== Biography ==
The Bergen International festival is the largest festival in the Nordic countries in its genre and has a large number of activities in music, dance, literature, visual arts, folklore, etc. The festival is held over fourteen days from the end of May to the start of June and is located in numerous places like the Grieg Hall, Haakon's Hall, Troldhaugen, Lysøen, Siljustøl as well as streets and town squares of Bergen. In the same time span the International Jazz Festival, Nattjazz, takes place in Bergen.

The first festival that started on 1 June 1953, exactly 55 years after its predecessor and source of inspiration, the first music festival in Norway Edvard Grieg's Bergen Music Festival starting on the 26 June 1898. The model was the Salzburg Festival, and the initiative came partly from opera singer Fanny Elstad. The original festival director was Frank Meidell Falch from 1951 to 1957. Christen Gran Bøgh, who died in 1955, also played a major role in the festival's first edition.

== Grieg’s concerto in A minor ==
Edvard Grieg’s piano concerto in A minor is often called the signature work of the Festival, and has been performed at almost every Festival since 1953. Here are all the soloists:

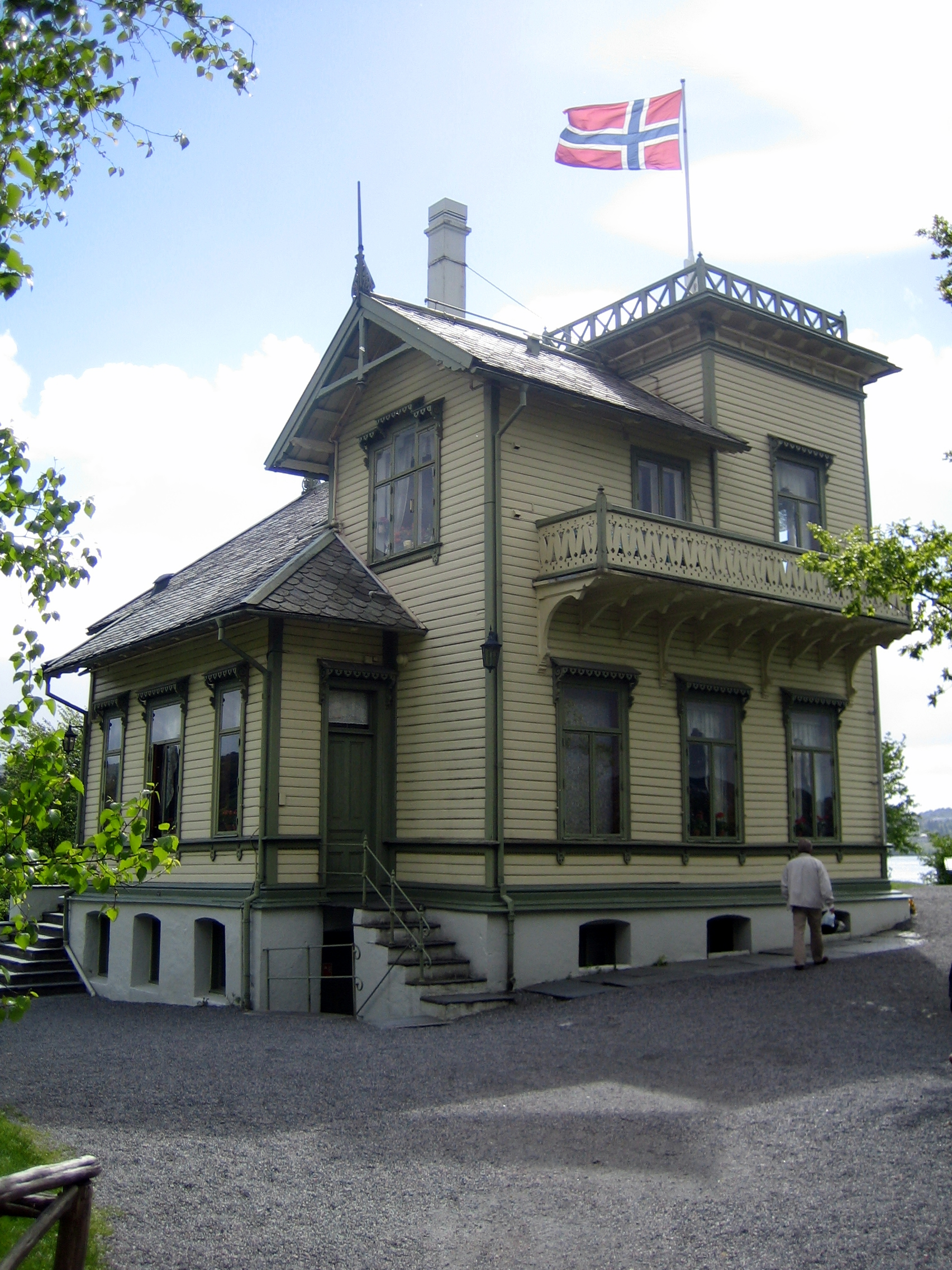
Troldhaugen, Edvard Grieg's home.

- 1953: Robert Riefling
- 1954: Ivar Johnsen
- 1955: Not performed
- 1956: Grant Johannesen
- 1957: Kjell Bækkelund
- 1958: Ivar Johnsen
- 1959: Robert Riefling
- 1960: Hans Richter-Haaser
- 1961: Grant Johannesen
- 1962: Liv Glaser
- 1963: Robert Riefling
- 1964: Benny Dahl-Hansen
- 1965: Grant Johannesen
- 1966: Gina Bachauer
- 1967: Jan Henrik Kayser
- 1968: Svjatsolav Richter
- 1969: Eva Knardahl
- 1970: Vladimir Ashkenazy
- 1971: Jens Harald Bratlie
- 1972: Radu Lupu
- 1973: Håkon Austbø
- 1974: Robert Riefling
- 1975: Einar Steen-Nøkleberg
- 1976: Steffan Scheja
- 1977: Jorunn Marie Bratlie
- 1978: Emil Gilels
- 1979: Geir Henning Braaten
- 1980: Einar Henning Smebye
- 1981: Karl Engel
- 1982: András Schiff
- 1983: Cécilie Ousset
- 1984: Eva Knardahl
- 1985: Bruno Leonardo Gelber
- 1986: Roland Pöntinen
- 1987: Bella Davidovich
- 1988: Leif Ove Andsnes
- 1989: Mark Zeltser
- 1990: Lyubow Timofeyeva
- 1991: John Kimura Parker
- 1992: Michael Rudy
- 1993: Leif Ove Andsnes
- 1994: Lilya Silberstein
- 1995: Lars Vogt
- 1996: Håvard Gimse
- 1997: Jean-Yves Thibaudet
- 1998: Nils Mortensen
- 1999: Noriko Ogawa
- 2000: Peter Jablonski
- 2001: Nikolai Luganskij
- 2002: Leif Ove Andsnes
- 2003: Håkon Austbø
- 2004: Gunilla Süssmann
- 2005: Anti Siirala
- 2006: Rian de Waal
- 2007: Percy Grainger/Pianola
- 2008: Sigurd Slåttebrekk
- 2009: Juho Pohjonen
- 2010: Gabriela Montero
- 2011: Ikke spilt
- 2012: Christian Ihle Hadland
- 2013: Marianna Shirinyan
- 2014: Simon Trpceski
- 2015: Ronald Brautigam
- 2024: Alexandra Dovgan

== Musician in residence ==
- 1997: Leif Ove Andsnes
- 1998: Randi Stene
- 1999: Christian Eggen
- 2001: Det Norske Kammerorkester
- 2003: Anne Sofie von Otter
- 2004: Henning Kraggerud
- 2005: Martin Fröst
- 2006: Per Arne Glorvigen
- 2007: Trio Mediæval
- 2008: Bjarte Eike
