= Princess Astrid Music Award =

Norwegian music award

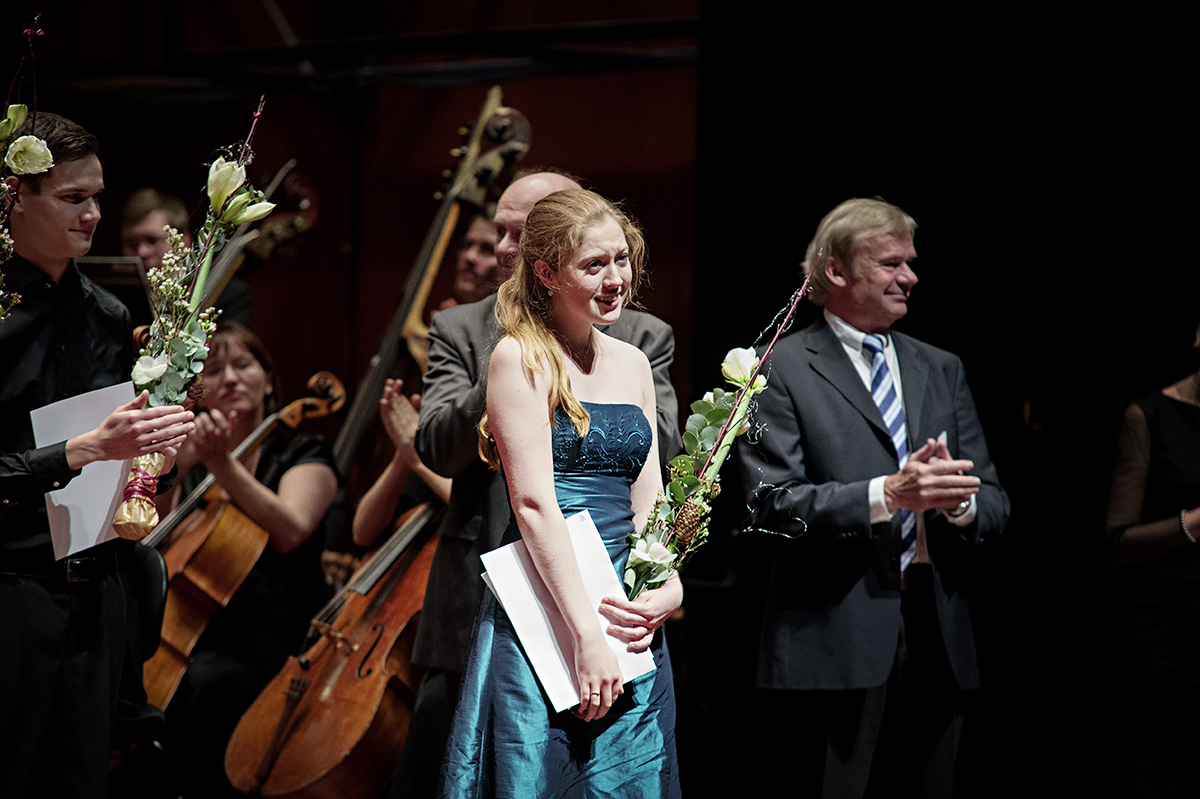
Violinist Miriam Helms Ålien, after winning the Princess Astrid Music Award in Trondheim, 2012

The Princess Astrid Music Award (Norwegian: Prinsesse Astrids musikkpris, established in 1953) is a Norwegian prize awarded to young Nordic musicians under the age of 30. The competition is sponsored by Princess Astrid (born 1932). The competition is held every other year (but was not held from 1968 to 1984). The competition is not held the same year as the Queen Sonja International Music Competition, which is also held every other year.

Finn Audun Oftedal, the conductor of the Trondheim Symphony Orchestra, first took the initiative to hold the competition. The competition is managed by the Trondheim Symphony Orchestra and Opera. Since 2012, the competition's focus has alternated between violinists and conductors.

Award winners receive diplomas and cash prizes, and the first-prize winner also receives soloist engagements or conducting engagements with the orchestra. Since 2016, the Finn Audun Oftedal Memorial Grant has been awarded to the best Norwegian participant.

== List of winners ==
- 1953 Kjell Bækkelund, pianist from Oslo
- 1956 Arve Tellefsen, violinist from Trondheim, runner-up Trond Øyen from Mosjøen
- 1958 Alf Andersen, flautist, awarded NOK 3,000, runners-up Ole Henrik Dahl and Torkil Bye
- 1961 Jan Henrik Kayser piano, runners-up Astrid Tese Krognes and Eva Christiansen Øierud
- 1963 Ørnulf Boye Hansen violin, runners-up Otto W. Berg and Jan Bøbak
- 1965 Per Øien from Bergen and Torkil Bye from Oslo, both flautists, sharing second place and awarded NOK 5,000 (Note: No first prize was awarded in 1965.)
- 1967 Geir Henning Braaten, pianist from Oslo, awarded NOK 5,000, runners-up Elsa Rita Thorsen and Karl-Otto Hagen-Olsen
- 1985 Håvard Gimse pianist (19) from Kongsvinger, awarded NOK 15,000, runners-up Jørgen Larsen and Jorunn Marie Bratlie
- 1987 Sveinung Lillebjerka, violinist (21) from Bodø, awarded NOK 15,000, runners-up Harald Aadland and Åsta Jørgensen
- 1989 Bodil Arnesen soprano (22) from Hauge, awarded NOK 50,000, runners-up Njål Sparbo and Randi Stene
- 1993 Cecilie Hesselberg Løken, flautist (23) from Drammen, awarded NOK 50,000, runners-up Håvard Lysebo and Trine Knutsen
- 1996 Øystein Sonstad, cellist (26) from Stjørdal, awarded NOK 50,000, runners-up Espen Lilleslåtten and Are Sandbakken
- 2000 Frode Amundsen, tuba player from Masfjorden, awarded NOK 50,000, runners-up Marius Hesby and Steinar Granmo Nilsen
- 2002 David Coucheron, violinist (18) from Nesoddtangen awarded NOK 50,000, runners-up Øyvind Bjorå and Hans Petter Mæhle
- 2008 Anders Nilsson, violinist (24), awarded NOK 75,000, runners-up Jan Clemens Carlsen and Liv Hilde Klokk
- 2010 Jie Zhang, pianist (26), awarded NOK 80,000, runners-up Joachim Carr (22) and John Chen (19)
- 2012 Miriam Helms Ålien, violinist (21) from Alta, awarded NOK 200,000, runners-up Mari Poll (25) from Estonia and Viktor Stenhjem (23) from Trondheim.
- 2014 Elena Schwarz (Switzerland/Australia), runners-up Giancarlo Rizzi (Italy) and Marcio da Silva (Brazil), all conductors
- 2016 Mayumi Kanagawa, violinist from the United States, runner-up Ludvig Gudim (Norway)
- 2018 Yuwon Kim (South Korea), runners-up Simon Proust (France) and Nils Erik Måseidvåg (Norway), all conductors
- 2021 Yukari Ohno, violinist (Japan), ahead of Karen Su (USA) and Marie Helling (Germany/Poland)
- 2022 Alvin Ho (UK / Hong Kong), ahead of Toby Thatcher (UK / Australia) and Junping Qian (China), all conductors
- 2024 Violin- Sara Dragan (25), Poland; Jiayi Chen (28), People's Republic of China; Sungmin Cho (26), Republic of Korea
- 2026 Conductors: Matthew Rhodes (1st Prize), Agata Zając (2nd Prize), and Elias Brown (3rd Prize)
