= Grythe =

Grythe is a surname. Notable people with the surname include:

- Ada Haug Grythe (1934–2014), Norwegian journalist
- Hilde Grythe (born 1955), Norwegian actress
- Odd Grythe (1918–1995), Norwegian radio and television personality
- Torstein Grythe (1918–2009), Norwegian choir leader
