= Griegprisen =

Award to Norwegian in musical field who specially communicated the music of Grieg

Griegprisen (established 1972 in Bergen, Norway) is awarded by the Edvard Grieg Museum Troldhaugen to a Norwegian musician, conductor or musicologist who in a special way have communicated the music of Edvard Grieg. It has also been awarded an extraordinary five times to people who have made a special effort to Edvard Grieg and Troldhaugen. The prize is awarded every year on the birthday of Edvard Grieg, 15 June.

== Winners ==
- 1972: Jens Harald Bratlie
- 1973: Arve Tellefsen
- 1974: Olav Eriksen
- 1975: Follesø Mannskor & Valter Aamodt
- 1976: Hindarkvartetten
- 1976: Sigmund Torsteinson (extraordinary)
- 1977: Edith Thallaug
- 1978: Jan Henrik Kayser, Anne Bolstad & Finn Nielsen
- 1979: Terje Tønnesen
- 1980: Eva Knardahl
- 1981: Finn Benestad & Dag Schjelderup-Ebbe
- 1981: Carl O. Gram Gjesdal (extraordinary)
- 1982: Bergen Filharmoniske Orkester & Karsten Andersen
- 1983: Det Norske Kammerorkester
- 1984: Ellen Westberg Andersen
- 1985: Bergen Domkantori & Magnar Mangersnes
- 1985: Johan Severud (extraordinary)
- 1986: Aage Kvalbein
- 1987: Marianne Hirsti
- 1988: Einar Steen-Nøkleberg
- 1989: Harald Bjørkøy
- 1990: Leif Ove Andsnes
- 1991: Truls Mørk
- 1992: Ole Kristian Ruud
- 1993: Elizabeth Norberg-Schulz
- 1994: Rikskonsertene / Fylkeskonsertane i Hordaland
- 1995: Jiri Hlinka
- 1996: Håvard Gimse
- 1997: Grieg Trio
- 1998: Henning Kraggerud & Helge Kjekshus
- 1999: Inger Elisabeth Haavet
- 2000: Bodil Arnesen & Erling Ragnar Eriksen
- 2001: Ragnhild Heiland Sørensen
- 2001: Lizsy Sandal (extraordinary)
- 2002: Not awarded
- 2003: Håkon Austbø
- 2004: Per Gynt-stemnet på Vinstra, by director Svein Sturla Hungnes & conductor: Eldar Nilsen
- 2005: Vertavo-kvartetten
- 2006: Per Vollestad & Sigmund Hjelset
- 2007: Bergen Filharmoniske Orkester & Ole Kristian Ruud
- 2007: Erling Dahl jr. (extraordinary)
- 2008: Not awarded
- 2009: Njål Sparbo
- 2010: Audun Kayser
