= Finn Mortensen =

Norwegian musician

Finn Einar Mortensen (January 6, 1922 – May 23, 1983) was a Norwegian composer, critic and educator.

Mortensen was born in Oslo. His parents were publisher Ernst Gustav Mortensen (1887–1966) and Anna Marie Damnæs (1886–1960). Mortensen grew up in a publishing environment and it was at first expected that he would go into his father's publishing firm, Ernst G. Mortensens Forlag A/S. He studied harmony with Thorleif Eken (1900–1955), composition with Klaus Egge and with Niels Viggo Bentzon at The Royal Danish Academy, as well as the piano and double bass at the Oslo Conservatory of Music. He also participated in the Darmstadt summer school and in the classes conducted by Karlheinz Stockhausen at the Studio für Elektronische Musik in Cologne.

The first public presentation of one of Mortensen's compositions was the Trio for Strings, Op. 3, which was played at the Young Nordic Music Festival in Oslo in 1950. In April 1954 he had his debut as a composer, along with Øistein Sommerfeldt. He was the leader of the group Ny Musikk, a Norwegian advocacy group for contemporary music, between 1961 and 1964, and between 1966 and 1967. From 1963-73, he was a music critic in Dagbladet, and he was also for many years correspondent for the major German magazine Melos. When the Norwegian Concert Institute was established in 1968, he became the institution's first director. From 1970 onward, he taught at the Oslo Conservatory of Music, becoming Norway's first professor of composition in 1973.

Rolf Wallin, Jon Mostad, Lasse Thoresen, Terje Bjørklund and Synne Skouen are among his students.

Until about 1953, Mortensen's music was mostly influenced by neoclassicism and expressionism. It later assimilated twelve-tone and aleatoric influences, creating what Mortensen termed a "neo-serial" style. From a point of departure in neo-classicism he became deeply involved with serial techniques. In Norway, Mortensen's works are still regularly performed by leading orchestras. In the rest of the world, however, he is less well-known.

== Production ==
=== Selected works ===
==== Orchestral works ====
- Symfoni, op. 5 (1953)
- Pezzo orchestrale (1957)
- Evolution (1961)
- Klangfarger (1962)
- Hedda (1974–75)
- Klaverkonsert (1963)
- Fantasi for klaver og orkester (1965–66)
- Fantasi for fiolin og orkester (1977)

==== Chamber music ====
- Blåsekvintett (1951)
- Sonata for flute solo op. 6 (1953)
- Klaverkvartett (1960)
- Constellations for accordeon, gitar og slagverk (1971)
- Nyserialisme I, II og III for varierende besetning (1971–73)
- Adagio og fuge for 16 horn (uten år)
- Suite for 5 blokkfløyter og strykekvintett (1978–79)

==== Piano works ====
- Sonatine (1943–48)
- Sonatine (1949–52)
- 2 sonater (1956, 1977)
- Fantasi og fuge (1957–58)
- Sonate for 2 klaver (1964)
- Impressions (1971)

=== Discography ===
- Egil Hovland, Bjørn Fongaard, Finn Mortensen, Knut Nystedt/Fartein Valen – Contemporary Music From Norway (1967)
- Alfred Janson, Finn Mortensen, Tor Brevik, Johan Kvandal, Contemporary Music From Norway (1971)
- Klaus Egge, Finn Mortensen, Egil Hovland, Symphony No. 4 Op. 30/Fantasy For Piano And Orchestra, Op. 27/Lamenti For Orchestra, Op. 43 (1971)
- Göteborgs Blåsarkvintett, Mortensen/Holmboe/Carlstedt/Salmenhaara – Blåsekvintet Op. 4/Notturno Op. 19/Sinfonietta För Fem Blåsare/Kvintetto Puhaltimille (1975)
- Egil Hovland, Finn Mortensen, Arne Nordheim, Contemporary Music From Norway (1975)
- Antonio Bibalo, Finn Mortensen Sonata For Piano/Sonatina No. 1, Op. 1/Sonatina No. 2, Op. 2 (1979)
- Finn Mortensen, Oslo-Filharmonien, Mariss Jansons Symphony Op. (1982)
- Ørnulf Gulbransen, Finn Mortensen, Conrad Baden, Edvard Fliflet Bræin, Bjarne Brustad – Homage To A Soloist – Music For Solo Flute (1986)
- Einar Henning Smebye, Beethoven, Liszt, Schoenberg, Mortensen – Expressionism Anticipated And Fulfilled (1987)
- Symphony No. 1/Wind Quintet/Suite For Wind (1988)
- Paul Hindemith, Arnold Schoenberg, Finn Mortensen, Frantisek Veselka, Kirsten Landmark Mæland, Milena Dratvová, Sonata In E (1935)/Fantasy For Violin With Piano Accompaniment, Op. 47/Duo Per Soprano E Violino (1958)/Sonata For Violin And Piano, Op. 17/Three Pieces For Violin And Piano, Op. 21 (1990)
- Fantasy For Piano And Orchestra/Per Orchestra/Fantasy And Fugue For Piano/Concerto For Piano And Orchestra/From Five Studies For Solo (2000)
- Fartein Valen, Klaus Egge, Finn Mortensen, Rolf Wallin, Håkon Austbø, Norwegian Imperatives (2009)
