= Terje Tønnesen =

Norwegian classical violinist

- Born: 27 February 1955 (age 71); Oslo
- Origin: Norway
- Genres: Classical
- Occupation: Musician
- Instrument: Violin
- Labels: ECM Records, Grappa Music, Simax Classics
- Website: www.detnorskekammerorkester.no/om-oss/terje-tonnesen.aspx

Terje Tønnesen (born 27 February 1955 in Oslo, Norway) is a Norwegian classical violinist. His first marriage, from 1979 to 1986, was to the pianist Reidun Askeland (born 1957). In 1986 he married the actress Hilde Grythe (born 18 July 1955), daughter of NRK program host Odd Grythe (1918–94) and film director Kirsten Sørlie (1926–2013).

== Career ==
Tønnesen made a sensational debut at age 17 in 1972, "A dazzling debut with hardly any parallel", as it was described in the Oslo newspaper. After five years of study in Switzerland, in 1977 he began his positions both as artistic director of "Det Norske Kammerorkester" and as first concertmaster of the Oslo Filharmoniske Orkester. He also moves beyond the classical repertoire, including collaborations with fellow musical omnivore Terje Rypdal, and is among the leading violinists with a central position in the Norwegian musical scene.

Tønnesen has won several international awards and has received both the Grieg Award and Kritikerprisen in Norway. He has toured in Europe, USA, China, and the Soviet Union and during his career worked with such musicians as Mstislav Rostropovich, Maurice André, and James Galway. He has also made solo appearances with all the Norwegian orchestras and many orchestras outside Norway.

== Honors ==
- 1979: Griegprisen
- 1979/80: Musikk-kritikerprisen
- 1992: Oslo City Culture Award
- 2000: Spellemannprisen

== Discography (in selection) ==
=== As soloist ===
- 1980: Johan Halvorsen: Air Norvegien – Tre Norske Danser – Veslemøys Sang – Danse Visionaire – Norske Eventyrbilleder (Norsk Kulturråds Klassikerserie), with Filharmonisk Selskaps Orkester, conductor: Karsten Andersen
- 1980: Edvard Grieg: The Complete Music for String Orchestra (BIS), with Norwegian Chamber Orchestra, conductor: Karsten Andersen
- 1986: Geir Henning Braaten: Geir Henning Braaten/Terje Tønnesen (Simax catalog|Simax Classics), with Geir Henning Braaten (piano)
- 1987: Terje Rypdal: Undisonus (ECM Records), with the Royal Philharmonic Orchestra, conductor: Christian Eggen
- 1990: Grieg • Brustad • Halvorsen (Victoria), with Reidun Askeland (piano) & Lars Anders Tomter (viola)
- 1993: Edvard Grieg: Complete Violin Sonatas (Victoria), with Einar Henning Smebye (piano)

=== Collaborative works ===
Within The Norwegian Chamber Orchestra

- 2008: Village Variations (Jaro Medien), with Moscow Art Trio

With other projects

- 1993: Antonín Dvořák / Alexander Glasunow* / Robert Schumann: Musikalische Freundschaften – Grenzenlos (WestLB),
- 2000: Dvořák: Cello Concert (Virgin Classics), with Truls Mørk & Oslo Philharmonic Orchestra, conductor: Mariss Jansons
- 2004: Cello Concert (Virgin Classics), with Truls Mørk (5xCD)
