= Bjørn G. Gjerstrøm =

Norwegian contemporary composer (1939–2017)

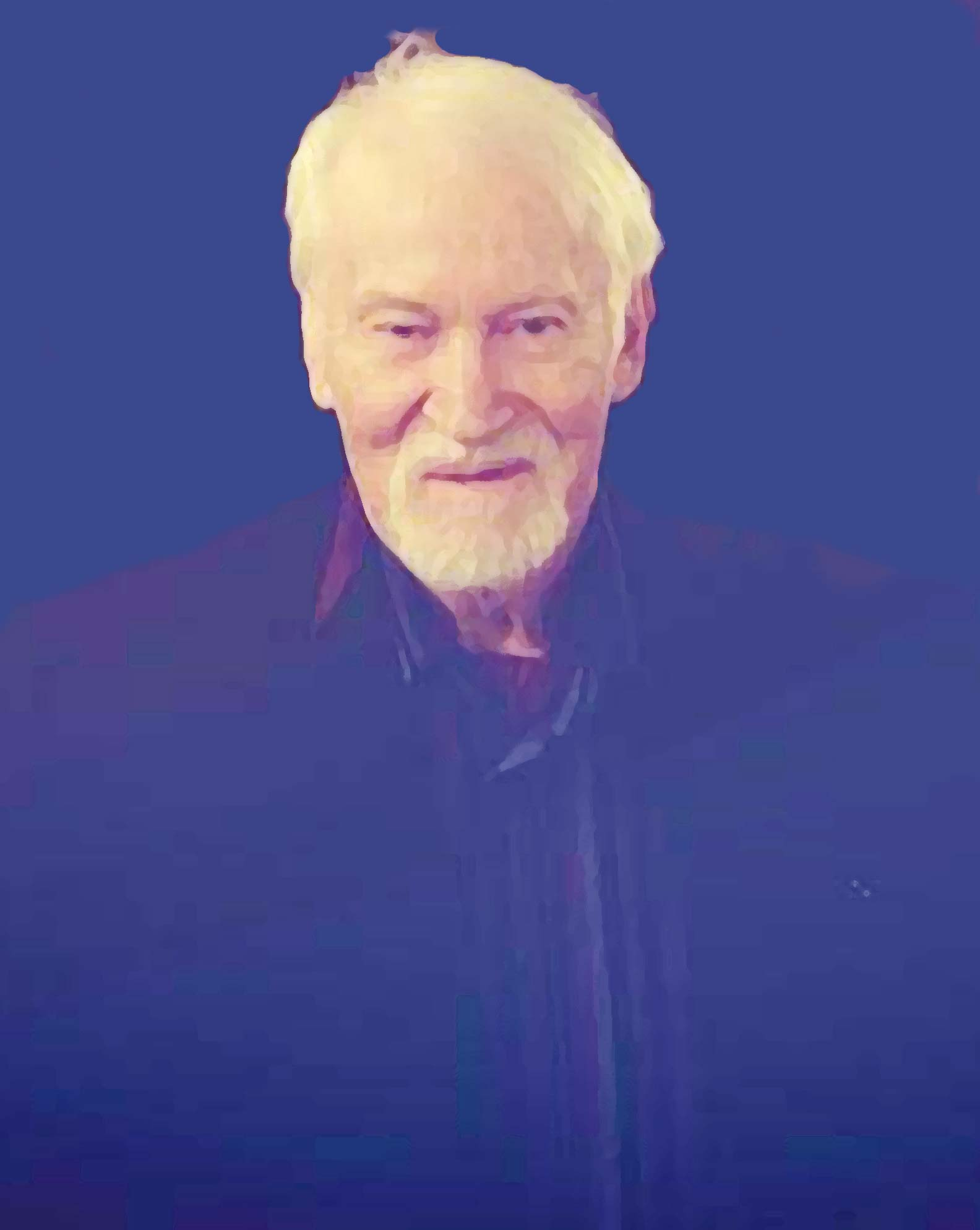
Bjørn G. Gjerstrøm

Bjørn G. Gjerstrøm (7 June 1939 – 7 May 2017) was a Norwegian contemporary composer.

== Biography ==
Bjørn G. Gjerstrøm was born in Oslo on 7 June 1939. From an early age, Gjerstrøm's interest in music was influenced by his parents, the composer and organist Gunnar Gjerstrøm and music teacher Elsa Gjerstrøm. His mother began teaching him piano from the age of 4-5. He completed his first composition at the age of 9. At the age of twelve, his first compositions, 5 piano pieces that he performed on Norwegian and Swedish radio, were published by Norsk Notestikk and Forlag.

In the 1960s, Gjerstrøm studied with Trygve Lindeman and Conrad Baden at the Oslo Conservatory or Music, where he attended classes in music theory, harmony and composition. He also studied piano with Waldemar Alme and Ivar Johnsen. From 1969 to 1976 he studied composition with Hallvard Johnsen.

Gjerstrøm’s list of works encompasses film scores, orchestral works, chamber music as well as solo pieces for flute, oboe, guitar and accordion. Gjerstrøm has also penned songs for poems by Peter R. Holm, Stein Mehren, Arnulf Øverland and Elsa Gjerstrøm.

Bjørn G. Gjerstrøm died on 7 May 2017, at the age of 77.

== Production ==
=== Selected works ===
- Stringquartet, No. 1, Op. 47 (2004)
- Nocturne : Hommage á Poulenc, Op. 41 (2001)
- Ved havet, op. 5 (1996)
- Konsert for obo og strykere, op. 17 (1986)
- Konsert for klaver og orkester op. 7 (1983)
- Camara de Lobos, op. 8 (1974)

=== Discography ===
- Øyvind Aase, Two Composers - Two Generations (1996)
- Kjell Bækkelund, 20Th Century Bækkelund (1996)
