= Anfinn Øien =

Norwegian organist and music teacher (1922–2018)

Anfinn Hans August Øien (March 29, 1922 − November 12, 2018) was a Norwegian organist and music teacher.

Øien was born in Aurskog, and grew up on the Øien farm until he moved to Oslo in 1939 for upper secondary education. He studied at the Oslo Conservatory of Music and under the organist Finn Viderø in Copenhagen. He started working as a church organist in 1946, including at Lilleborg Church in Oslo. He started teaching at the Oslo Conservatory of Music in 1966 and served as its head from 1969 to 1973. After the Norwegian Academy of Music was established in 1973, he served as a senior instructor of harmony and counterpoint from 1973 to 1984, and then held the position of full professor from 1985 to 1990. He composed church music and also music for the hymn "Guds menighet er jordens største under" (God's Congregation Is Earth's Greatest Wonder) by Ronald Fangen, and he published a popular book on music theory. He set 16 hymns by Per Lønning to music in 2000, published by Cantando music publishers in Stavanger, and one of them was adopted as a new city song of Oslo.

Øien resided at Blommenholm between 1968 and 2002, when he moved back to Aurskog. He was the grandfather of the guitarist Anders Clemens Øien.

In 2002 he was awarded the King's Medal of Merit in gold.

== Publications ==
- Andreasmesse, en generasjonsgudstjeneste (St. Andrew's Fair, a Worship Service for Youth; booklet and CD, 2000). Hymns by Svein Ellingsen.
- Harmonilære: funksjonell harmonikk i homofon sats (Harmony: Functional Harmony and Homophonic Theory; 1975)
