= Halvor Kleppen =

Halvor Kleppen (born 3 September 1947 in Bø i Telemark) is a Norwegian media personality, theme park owner and writer.

He was hired in Norwegian Broadcasting Corporation radio in 1973, and worked in the entertainment department. In the summer of 1982 he presented the show Sumarteltet, where he toured with a circus and made an entertainment show from that. In 1982 he was awarded the Se og Hør readers' TV personality of the year award. He left the Norwegian Broadcasting Corporation later that year to become a freelancer. He later hosted the show Starshot on TVNorge, where celebrities were invited to try skeet shooting.

He also co-owns Bø Sommarland, a waterpark in Bø i Telemark. He has also hosted a TVNorge summer show from here, Sommer i Sommarland. He has written several books, mostly about local history or skiing. In 2007 he took a master's degree at Telemark University College.

Awards
Preceded by Kari Sørby	Se og Hør's TV Personality of the Year; 1982	Succeeded by Knut Bjørnsen
