= Smebye =

Smebye is a surname. Notable people with the surname include:

- Einar Henning Smebye (born 1950), Norwegian pianist and music teacher
- Sigurd Smebye (1886–1954), Norwegian gymnast

== See also ==
- Smeby
