= Lilleborg =

Lilleborg may refer to:

- Lilleborg (company), a hygiene and cleaning article company in Norway
- Lilleborg, Bornholm, a ruined castle in Bornholm, Denmark
- Lilleborg Church, a church in Oslo, Norway

== See also ==
- Lilleberge
- Lilljeborg
- Lilleorg
