= Kari Sørby =

Norwegian television personality

Kari Sørby (28 October 1938 – 28 September 1987) was a Norwegian television personality.

She was born in Kristiansand, and studied at the University of Oslo. She was hired in the Norwegian Broadcasting Corporation in 1970 and was promoted to program secretary in 1971. Her most profiled job on the television screen was as the news anchor in Dagsrevyen. In 1981 she was awarded the Se og Hør readers' TV personality of the year award. In 1983 she published a memoir, På min måte. Fra et nær- og fjernsynt liv.

Awards
Preceded by Einar Johannessen	Se og Hør's TV Personality of the Year; 1981	Succeeded by Halvor Kleppen
