= Magnar Mangersnes =

Norwegian organist and choral conductor (1938–2023)

- Born: 31 October 1938; Radøy, Norway
- Died: 9 January 2023 (aged 84)
- Occupations: Organist and choral conductor
- Awards: Griegprisen (1985); Silver Rose Bowl (1985, 1988); Order of St. Olav (2000)

Magnar Mangersnes (31 October 1938 – 9 January 2023) was a Norwegian organist and choral conductor.

== Early and personal life ==
Mangersnes was born on the island of Radøy, Norway, to Johannes Mikal Mangersnes and Maria Mosevoll. He married Kari Eli Mikkelsen in 1962. He graduated as teacher in 1962, and from the Bergen Musikkonservatorium in 1966.

== Career ==
From 1971 Mangersnes was assigned Organist and Master of the Choristers (Norwegian: domkantor) in the Bergen Cathedral. He established and conducted the choir Bergen Domkantori from 1971. The choir was awarded Spellemannprisen in 1979 for the album Folketoner i glass og ramme. He has conducted a number of choirs in the Bergen district, and received several awards, including Griegprisen in 1985. He was decorated Knight, First Class of the Order of St. Olav in 2000.

Mangersnes died on 9 January 2023, at the age of 84.
