= Ørebladet =

Norwegian newspaper

Ørebladet is a former Norwegian newspaper, issued from 1891 to 1924. Ørebladet became defunct in 1924, when it was incorporated in the newspaper Tidens Tegn.

Among the journalists working for Ørebladet were Øvre Richter Frich, Sven Elvestad, Ernst G. Mortensen and Kitty Wentzel, and theatre critic Ludovica Levy.
