= Ernst G. Mortensen =

Norwegian publisher

Ernst Gustav Mortensen (17 September 1887 – 13 October 1966) was a Norwegian publisher. Born in Kristiania (now Oslo), he established Norway's first correspondence school and his own publishing house. He started new paths in Norwegian publishing business, and published Leo Tolstoy's collected works in twelve volumes. Mortensen also founded new magazines and periodicals, some of which were censored by German occupants during the Second World War.

== Early and personal life ==
His father was gardener Carl Gustav Mortensen (1850–1899) and his mother Anna Kristine Solberg (1855–1930). He grew up in Kristiania and took secondary school exam in 1903 and final exam at Treider College in 1905. He married Anne Marie Damnæs (1886–1960) at an unknown point, with whom he had the son Finn Mortensen (1922–1983).

== Career ==
In 1906, he started working at Ørebladet, and, in the following year, for the youth magazine Ekko. After having spent half a year in the United States, Mortensen established Mortensen Norsk Korrespondanseskole (NKS), Norway's first correspondence school. In the first year, NKS had 125 pupils; 15 years later it had 9,000 and during the Second World War it had more than 50,000. In 1928, Mortensen established the publishing house Nasjonalforlaget, where he was director until 1934. He also established the publisher Ernst G. Mortensens forlag and a few magazines which sold well. All of his enterprises were merged into Ernst G. Mortensen & Co A/S in 1958.

His publishing house Nasjonalforlaget published inexpensive book series; a novel could cost only 3 kr with leathered cover. It published many foreign-language book series that had not been translated into Norwegian before, amongst them Tolstoy's collected works in twelve volumes. Apart from novel series, Nasjonalforlaget also published boys' novels, crime literature, classics and encyclopaedias. In 1933, Mortensen started Norsk Ukeblad, but had to sell it along with Nasjonalforlaget one year later. He also had to promise to not start a new publishing house within the next seven years. Magnus Andresen, who acquired Norsk Ukeblad, experienced economic loss with the acquisition, and sold it back half a year later.

In 1938, Mortensen founded the Damebladet ("Women's Magazine"). It and Norsk Ukeblad sold well, with Norsk Ukeblad being the largest magazine in the country with its 100,000 sold issues in 1940. However, the German occupants in Norway during the Second World War censored it in 1943. After the war, Ernst G. Mortensens Forlag became Norway's leading magazine publisher, with Vi Menn (started in 1951) and Det Nye (started in 1957) as its frontline magazines. In 1958, Carl L. Mortensen became managing director of the publishing house, whilst Ernst G. Mortensen continued as chairman until 1965. Mortensen was decorated as a Knight, First Class of the Order of St. Olav in 1939. He died in October 1966 in Oslo, at age 79.
