= Kirsten Flagstad Prize =

Award for Norwegian singers by the Flagstad Society

- Description: Awarded to outstanding Norwegian singers to spread knowledge about Kirsten Flagstad's art
- Country: Norway
- Presented by: Flagstad Society
- Website: https://www.flagstadselskapet.no/

The Kirsten Flagstad Prize is awarded to outstanding Norwegian singers by the Flagstad Society. The Flagstad Society was founded by Torstein Gunnarson and Øystein Gaukstad in connection with the Norwegian soprano Kirsten Flagstad's 80th birthday in 1975, aiming to spread knowledge about Kirsten Flagstad's art and keep her name alive.

== Winners ==
- 1991 Bodil Arnesen, soprano
- 1992 Njål Sparbo, baritone
- 1993 Ragnhild Heiland Sørensen, soprano
- 1995 Linda Øvrebø, soprano
- 1997 Arild Helleland, tenor
- 1997 Ingjerd Oda Mantor, soprano
- 2002 Toril Carlsen, soprano
- 2004 Turid Karlsen, soprano
- 2006 Itziar Martinez Galdos, soprano
- 2007 Ingebjørg Kosmo, mezzo-soprano
- 2009 Ingunn Kilen, mezzo-soprano
- 2011 Yngve Søberg, baritone
- 2013 Rachel Willis-Sørensen, soprano
- 2015 Lise Davidsen, soprano
- 2020 Elisabeth Teige, soprano
- 2023 Ingegjerd Bagøien Moe
- 2025 Victoria Randem
