= Valter Aamodt =

Norwegian musician (1902–1989)

Valter Emil Aamodt, sometimes given in English language sources as Walter Emil Aamodt, (25 February 1902 – 5 August 1989) was a Norwegian composer, music critic, and music publishing executive. He was awarded the Griegprisen (English: Grieg Prize) in 1975. He was born and died in Bergen. He was the director of the Norwegian division of the Tonika music publishing company, and a longtime music critic for Bergens Tidende.
