= Genuin (record label) =

Record label

GENUIN classics
- Company type: Private
- Industry: Music entertainment
- Founded: 1998 (music production), 2003 (label)
- Headquarters: Leipzig, Germany
- Key people: Tonmeister Holger Busse, Alfredo Lasheras Hakobian (co-founders) and Michael Silberhorn (2006)
- Website: www.genuinclassics.com

GENUIN is an independent classical music label and remote classical music recording studio based in Leipzig, Germany. The term “genuin” comes from Latin and stands for “innate, authentic, not counterfeit.”

== History ==
The company was founded in Detmold, Germany in 1998 as "GENUIN Musikproduktion" by sound engineers Holger Busse and Alfredo Lasheras Hakobian. Five years later, in January 2003, the "GENUIN" classical music label began distributing CDs throughout Germany, with most releases produced by its own recording engineers.

In 2005, the company moved from Detmold to Leipzig as a result of which a fruitful collaboration with German broadcaster MDR and the famed Leipzig Gewandhaus resulted. In January 2006 Tonmeister Michael Silberhorn joined the company.

During 2009 GENUIN Musikproduktion restructured operations and now consists of its “GENUIN classics” label and music production company "GENUIN recording group."

== Repertoire and awards ==
In addition to the gamut of classical music repertoire, ranging from the Renaissance to New Music, the label also focuses on rarely performed works and promoting talented young recording artists. The label’s catalog now encompasses some 800 classical music albums which are distributed internationally through specialist CD retailers, record stores and online download and streaming platforms.

GENUIN recordings have, among other commendations, won the ECHO Klassik, the Opus Klassik, the Diapason d'Or as well as nominations for the Grammy Award and the MIDEM Classical Award.

== Musicians and Ensembles ==
Some musicians and ensembles who have recorded with GENUIN sound engineers:

- Artemis-Quartet
- Baiba Skride
- Camerata Musica Limburg
- Christoph Prégardien
- ensemble amarcord
- Gewandhaus Brass Quintett
- Gewandhaus Chor
- Helen Donath
- Caroline Fischer
- La Petite Bande
- L'arpa festante
- Leipziger Streichquartett
- Martin Stadtfeld
- Matthias Kirschnereit
- Nicolas Altstaedt
- Noëmi Nadelmann
- Paul Badura-Skoda
- Ragna Schirmer
- Stephan Schreckenberger
- Tobias Koch
- Walter Hilgers

== Orchestras ==
GENUIN recording engineers have worked with the following orchestras:

- Bach Collegium Japan (through MDR)
- Brandenburgisches Staatsorchester Frankfurt
- Die Deutsche Kammerphilharmonie Bremen
- Dresdner Philharmonie (through Deutschlandradio)
- Freiburger Barockorchester
- Gangnam Symphony Orchestra, Seoul
- Gewandhausorchester Leipzig
- Junge Deutsche Philharmonie (through Deutschlandradio)
- MDR Sinfonieorchester (through MDR)
- Orchester des Nationaltheaters Mannheim
- Rundfunk-Sinfonieorchester Berlin (through Deutschlandradio)
- Sächsische Bläserphilharmonie
- Staatskapelle Halle
- Staatskapelle Weimar
- Staatsorchester Braunschweig
- Suwon Symphony Orchestra, Seoul
