= Edith Thallaug =

Norwegian actress (1929–2020)

- Born: 16 June 1929; Bærum, Norway
- Died: 7 June 2020 (aged 90); Stockholm, Sweden
- Occupations: Singer, actress
- Employer(s): Studioteatret, Oslo; Nationaltheatret, Oslo; Stora Teatern, Gothenburg; Royal Swedish Opera, Stockholm
- Relatives: Anita Thallaug (sister)
- Awards: Hovsångerska; Griegprisen; Order of St. Olav

Edith Thallaug (16 June 1929 – 7 June 2020) was a Norwegian actress and opera singer.

== Personal life ==
Thallaug was born in Bærum to Rolf Thallaug and Marta Marie Halvorsen, and was a sister of actress and singer Anita Thallaug. She was married three times, first to violinist Bjarne Gullov Larsen, second to singer and director Ulf Björkegren, and third time to violinist Josef Benczy.

== Career ==
Thallaug was assigned with Studioteatret from 1947 to 1948 and with Nationaltheatret from 1948 to 1960. Her roles included "Helen" in Per Aabel's adaptation of de Caillavet and de Flers' comedy La belle aventure in 1952, and "Solveig" in Alfred Maurstad's staging of Ibsen's Peer Gynt in 1955. She made her debut concert as singer in Oslo University Aula in 1959, was assigned with Stora Teatern in Gothenburg from 1960 to 1964, and with the Royal Swedish Opera in Stockholm from 1964 to 1982. She was named Hovsångerska in 1976, and was awarded Griegprisen in 1977. Thallaug has also written the crime novel Den myrdede lever, under the name Edith Rolfsen, and published in 1950.

She was decorated Knight, First Class of the Order of St. Olav in 1983.

She died on 7 June 2020, nine days before her 91st birthday.
