= Rainer Trost =

German operatic tenor (born 1966)

- Born: October 30, 1966 (age 58); Stuttgart, West Germany
- Education: Stuttgarter Hymnus-Chorknaben; Hochschule für Musik, Munich
- Occupation: Operatic tenor
- Organizations: University of Music and Performing Arts Vienna
- Website: rainertrost.eu

Rainer Trost (born on October 30, 1966) is a German tenor whose performance repertoire encompasses operas, operettas, Lieder and oratorios. He is known for roles in Mozart operas. He is also a voice teacher at the University of Music and Performing Arts Vienna.

== Life ==
Trost spent his childhood and youth in Stuttgart where he was born. In his home town, he was a member of the Stuttgarter Hymnus-Chorknaben for many years. He first studied law, but turned to singing, studying in Freiburg im Breisgau, Stuttgart and from 1987 to 1991 at the Hochschule für Musik in Munich, among others with Adalbert Kraus. Subsequently, Trost was an ensemble member of the Staatsoper Hannover until 1995.

In 1992, Trost launched his international career as Ferrando in Mozart's Così fan tutte with conductor John Eliot Gardiner in Paris This performance was recorded live and released on the Deutsche Grammophon label. A Guardian review wrote: "few tenors on disc can rival the German Rainer Trost in the heady beauty of his voice – above all in Ferrando's aria Una aura amorosa." Later Trost performed especially with the tenor roles in Mozart operas such as Tamino, Belmonte, Ferrando, Don Ottavio, Idamante and the title role in La clemenza di Tito. He has appeared in Hamburg, Lisbon, Amsterdam, Ludwigsburg, Paris, Vienna, Geneva, Berlin, Brussels, Cologne, Barcelona, the Metropolitan Opera, at the Salzburg Festival and the Edinburgh Festival, at the Maggio Musicale in Florence and at the Royal Opera House Covent Garden in London. He also appeared as Count Balduin Zedlau in Wiener Blut by Johann Strauss at the Seefestspiele Mörbisch in August 2007, and as Arbace in Dieter Dorn's new production of Idomeneo on 14 June 2008 for the reopening of the Cuvilliés Theatre in Munich. He enjoyed success as Pylade in Gluck's Iphigénie en Tauride at the Theater an der Wien in October 2014. He created the role of Calogero in Manfred Trojahn's La grande magia at the Semperoper in Dresden in 2008.

Trost is also active as a concert singer. His repertoire includes works by Britten, Monteverdi, Mozart, Schubert and Bach.

Trost was appointed professor for voice at the University of Music and Performing Arts Vienna. Since 1 March 2021, he has been the deputy director of the Institute for Singing and Music Theater at the University of Music and Performing Arts Vienna.

== Awards ==
- 2013: Österreichischer Musiktheaterpreis – "Goldener Schikaneder" in the category best male supporting role for his role in Gluck's Telemaco at the Theater an der Wien

== Recordings ==
Trost recorded several operas, but also lieder, including a 2007 collection of Schubert songs with pianist Ulrich Eisenlohr. A reviewer noted that he was a "rather powerful singer but also an elegant and sensitive one. His voice has bite and character."

=== DVDs ===
- Richard Strauss: Capriccio (with Renée Fleming and Anne Sofie von Otter) OCLC 778608909
- Lehár: Der Graf von Luxemburg (with Juliane Banse) OCLC 1109985011
- Mozart: Così fan tutte (with Amanda Roocroft, Rod Gilfry, conducted by John Eliot Gardiner) OCLC 1013384673

=== CDs ===
- Bach: Bach-Kantaten in Berlin – 1000. Veranstaltung (BWV 11, live recording May 1998)
- Mozart: La clemenza di Tito. Deutsche Grammophon OCLC 68968498
- Mozart: Così fan tutte. Archiv OCLC 263661183
- Schubert: Die schöne Müllerin. Nightingale OCLC 872170323
- Gluck: La clemenza di Tito. Deutsche Harmonia Mundi OCLC 921303859
