= Trond Øyen =

Norwegian violinist

Trond Øyen (December 26, 1929 – July 12, 1999) was a Norwegian violinist from Vardø. He was recognized as one of Norway's leading violinists of his time.

After growing up in Mosjøen, Øyen studied in Oslo under Alf Sjøen and Bjarne Brustad in 1945. He studied under Ernst Glaser until his public debut concert with Guttorm Skjerven as an accompanist in 1954. He regularly worked as a substitute violinist for the Norwegian Radio Orchestra, the National Theater orchestra (starting in 1957), and the Norwegian National Opera orchestra (starting in 1958). Over the years he performed several times on solo programs on NRK radio. He studied further in Copenhagen under Henry Holst and the royal theater musician Henrik Sachsenskjold. He studied harmony under the philharmonic member and solo cellist Karl Andersen.

Øyen's became the second concert master of the Bergen Philharmonic Orchestra in 1960, and the first violinist with the Oslo Philharmonic in 1964. In the Oslo Philharmonic, he spent the last twenty years of his career as the fourth member in the first violin group. with regular promotion to first chair. He joined the Hindar Quartet in 1964 as the second violinist and participated as such in several recordings. As a soloist, he distinguished himself with performances of Christian Sinding's three violin concertos (Op. 45, 60, and 119) and his Suite in A Minor for Violin and Orchestra (Op. 10).

== Awards and recognitions ==
- Second place in the Princess Astrid Music Award, 1956
- The first Polar Circle Festival Prize in 1961 (now the Municipality of Rana Cultural Award)
- The A. C. Houen Grant in 1962
