= Ulrich Eisenlohr =

German classical pianist

Ulrich Eisenlohr (born 1950) is a German classical pianist.

== Biography and career ==
Eisenlohr studied at the Heidelberg/Mannheim Conservatory with Rolf Hartmann, and at the Stuttgart Conservatory, where he studied Lied with Konrad Richter. Specializing as a Lied accompanist and chamber music pianist, he began a concert career with performances at the Vienna Musikverein and Konzerthaus, the Berliner Festspiele, the Kulturzentrum Gasteig in Munich, the Schleswig-Holstein Musik Festival, Concertgebouw Amsterdam, the Edinburgh Festival, the Beethovenfest in Bonn and the Ludwigsburg Festival, and many others. As accompanist, he has performed with Lieder singers such as Christian Elsner, Matthias Goerne, Dietrich Henschel, Wolfgang Holzmair, Hanno Müller-Brachmann, Christoph Prégardien, Roman Trekel, Rainer Trost, Iris Vermillion, Michael Volle, Ruth Ziesak and others.

Eisenlohr has made a number of recordings for the Sony Classical, Harmonia Mundi, cpo and Naxos labels. He was notably the artistic leader of Naxos's Deutsche Schubert Lied Edition, a 38-CD series of all of Franz Schubert's songs, more than 700 altogether, featuring exclusively German singers.

Eisenlohr has been a lecturer at the Frankfurt and Karlsruhe conservatories, and has conducted master classes in lied and chamber music in Europe and Japan, with singers such as Ruth Ziesak, Jard van Nes and Rudolf Piernay. He has been assistant and accompanist for master classes with Hans Hotter, Christa Ludwig, Elsa Cavelti, Daniel Ferro and Geoffrey Parsons. Since 1982, he has taught a Lieder class at the Mannheim Conservatory of Music. Among his students was Caroline Fischer. He has been professor at the Musikhochschule Köln.
