= Lise Davidsen =

Norwegian operatic soprano (born 1987)

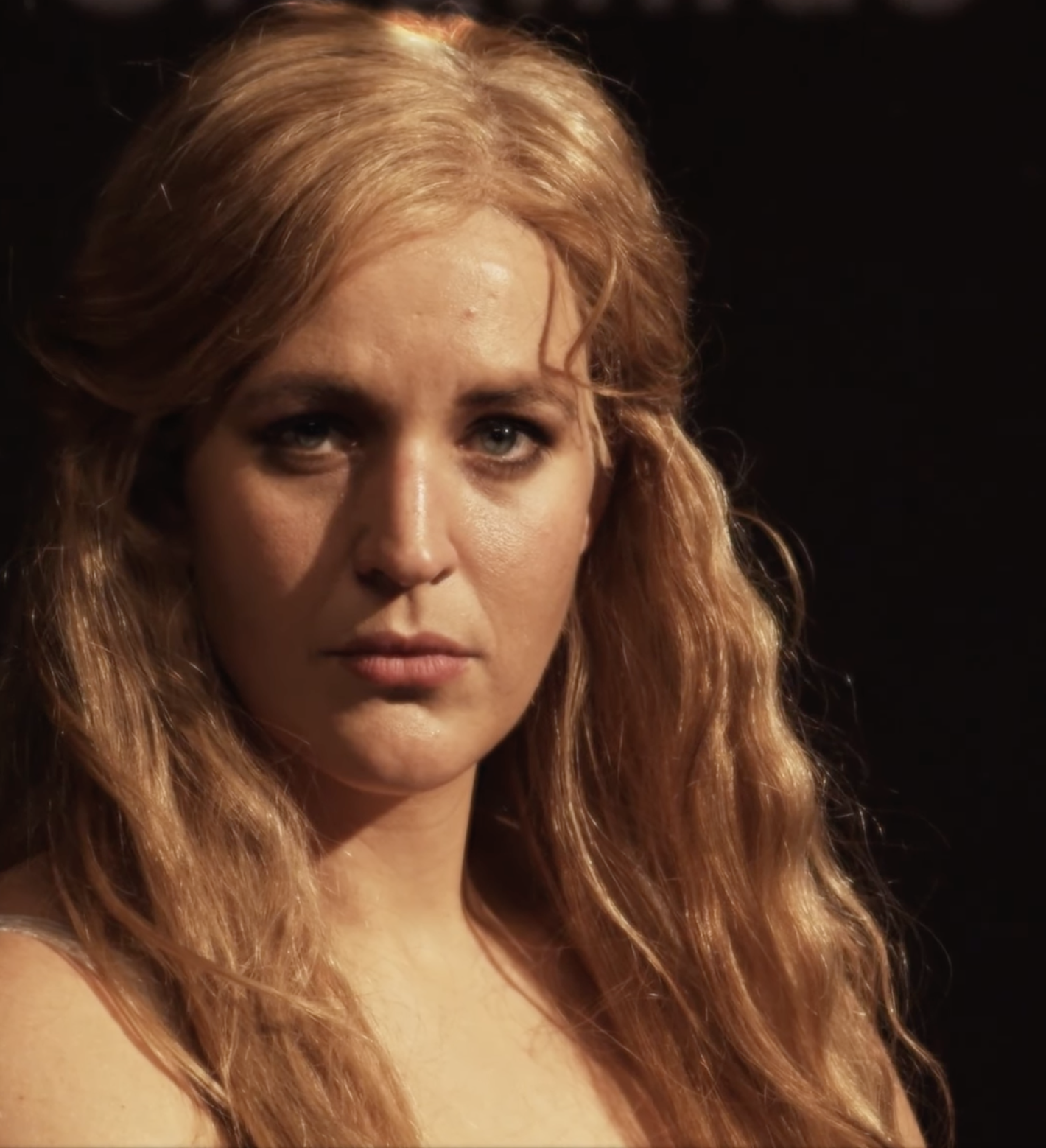
- Davidsen as Sieglinde in Deutsche Oper Berlin's 2020 staging of Die Walküre

Background information
- Born: 8 February 1987 (age 39); Stokke, Norway
- Genres: Classical music
- Occupation: Opera singer (soprano)
- Label: Decca Classics
- Spouse: Ben Adler
- Website: lisedavidsen.com

Lise Davidsen (born 8 February 1987) is a Norwegian operatic soprano. She came to prominence after winning the Operalia competition in London in 2015.

== Career ==
Lise Davidsen was born in 1987 in Stokke, Norway, and began playing guitar and singing at age 15. As she progressed, she focused on singing. In 2010, she received a bachelor's degree from the Grieg Academy of Music. During this period she sang as a mezzo-soprano with the Norwegian Soloists' Choir.

Davidsen then began studying for a master's degree at the Royal Opera Academy in Copenhagen, and her teacher helped her develop as an operatic soprano. In 2014, she performed as a soloist with the Berlin Philharmonic at a Royal Danish Music Conservatory concert, graduated from the Royal Opera Academy, and received the Léonie Sonning talent prize and the Danish Singers Award. She also received financial support from the Skipsreder Tom Wilhelmsen, Karen and Arthur Feldthusens, and Sine Butenschøns Foundations.

Davidsen made her first appearances with the Royal Danish Opera during the 2012–13 season, as the Dog and Owl in The Cunning Little Vixen. She then sang Emilia in Verdi's Otello and Rosalinde in Strauss's Die Fledermaus, and won the Reumert Talentpris.

In 2015, she won first prize in the Queen Sonja Competition and first prize and audience prize in the Operalia competition in London. She also won three prizes at the 2015 Hans Gabor Belvedere Singing Competition in Amsterdam, was an HSBC Aix-en-Provence Laureate, and received a Statoil Talent Bursary Award, the Léonie Sonning Music Prize, and the Kirsten Flagstad Prize. In 2018, she received the Queen Ingrid Prize and was named the Gramophone Magazine Young Artist of the Year.

In 2017, Davidsen made her debut at Glyndebourne, singing the title role in Strauss's Ariadne auf Naxos, gave her first recital at Wigmore Hall, and gave her first performance at the BBC Proms. She has also performed at the Zurich Opera House, Vienna State Opera, Aix-en-Provence Festival, Royal Opera House, Teatro Colón, and the Bavarian State Opera. During the 2017–18 season, she was an artist-in-residence with the Bergen Philharmonic Orchestra. In 2019, she made her debut at the Metropolitan Opera, New York, in the leading role of Lisa in Tchaikovsky's The Queen of Spades.

Davidsen debuted on 10 May 2021 at La Scala when the opera house reopened after having shut down due to the COVID-19 pandemic. She sang arias by Tchaikovsky, Henry Purcell, Richard Wagner, Richard Strauss, and Giuseppe Verdi.

On 9 September 2023, Davidsen closed out the Last Night of the Proms as the vocal soloist. She had been scheduled to fill this role in 2022, but the event was canceled that year following the death of Queen Elizabeth II.

Davidsen appeared as Leonora in the Metropolitan Opera's production of Verdi's La forza del destino (directed by Mariusz Treliński) that opened on 26 February 2024. In March 2026, she starred in the Met's production of Wagner's Tristan und Isolde directed by Yuval Sharon, which New York Times critic Joshua Barone called "the event of the season". Her collaboration with Sharon and the Met is scheduled to continue with a new production of Wagner's Ring Cycle with Davidsen as Brünnhilde. She will open the Met's 2026-2027 season with a house role debut in Verdi's Macbeth.

On June 5, 2026, at Carnegie Hall, Davidsen gave a performance of Schubert Lieder, accompanied by James Baillieu on piano.

== Recordings ==
In 2016, Davidsen recorded songs by John Frandsen on the Dacapo Records label, and later that year her record As Dreams, on BIS Records, featured her with the Norwegian Soloists' Choir and the Oslo Sinfonietta, conducted by Grete Pedersen, singing works by Alfred Janson, Helmut Lachenmann, Per Nørgård, Kaija Saariaho, and Iannis Xenakis. She sang the role of Anitra in a recording of Peer Gynt with the Bergen Philharmonic Orchestra and Choir conducted by Edward Gardner released in 2018 on the Chandos label.

In May 2018 she signed an exclusive recording contract with Decca Classics. Her recital albums on Decca include:

- Lise Davidsen (31 May 2019) including works by Strauss and Wagner performed with the Philharmonia Orchestra conducted by Esa-Pekka Salonen
- Beethoven - Wagner - Verdi (26 Mar 2021) performed with the London Philharmonic Orchestra conducted by Mark Elder
- Grieg (7 Jan 2022) including works by Edvard Grieg accompanied by pianist and fellow Norwegian Leif Ove Andsnes
- Christmas from Norway (10 November 2023), a holiday program with the Norwegian Radio Orchestra conducted by Christian Eggen
- Live at the Met (5 Mar 2026), a live concert at the Metropolitan Opera with pianist James Baillieu, recorded in September 2023

Davidsen sang the role of Agathe in a complete recording of Der Freischütz conducted by Marek Janowski, released in 2019 on Pentatone. In April 2025, Decca released a complete audio recording of Wagner's Der fliegende Holländer starring Davidsen as Senta and Gerald Finley as the Holländer, conducted by Edward Gardner at the Norwegian National Opera. Recorded from two live concert performances in 2024, this recording was promoted by Decca as the only time Davidsen will ever sing the role.

Davidsen also appears as Ortlinde in a DVD of a live performance of Die Walküre from the Royal Opera House, as Elisabeth in Tannhäuser, filmed at the Bayreuth Festival, and as Fidelio/Leonore in a visual album of the last performance of Fidelio at the Royal Opera House before the lockdown in March 2020.

Since 2022, the Metropolitan Opera Live in HD series has recorded several performances featuring Davidsen: Ariadne auf Naxos (March 12, 2022), Der Rosenkavalier (April 15, 2023), La Forza del Destino (March 9, 2024), Tosca (November 23, 2024), Fidelio (March 15, 2025), and Tristan und Isolde (March 21, 2026).

== Personal life ==
Davidsen is married to filmmaker Ben Adler. She suffered a miscarriage in autumn 2023, and another in spring 2024. She gave birth to twin sons in spring 2025.
