= Tobias Koch (pianist) =

German musician

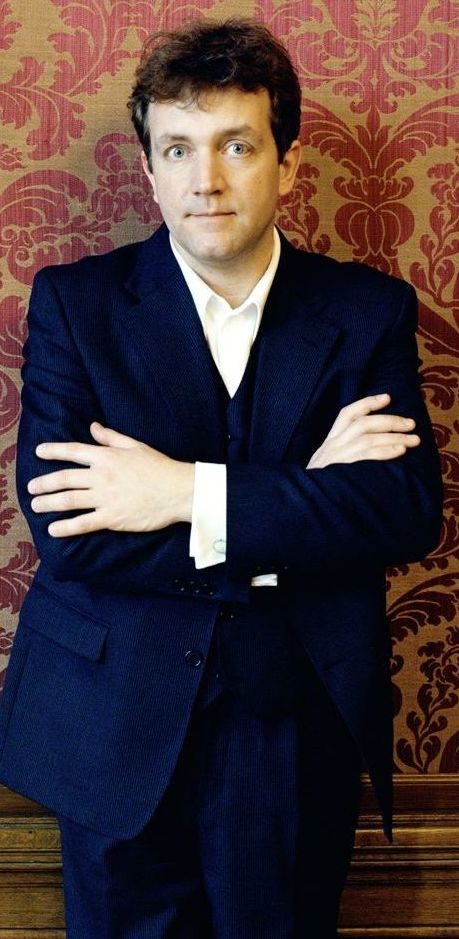
Tobias Koch in 2009

Tobias Koch (born September 11, 1968) is a German pianist.

== Biography ==
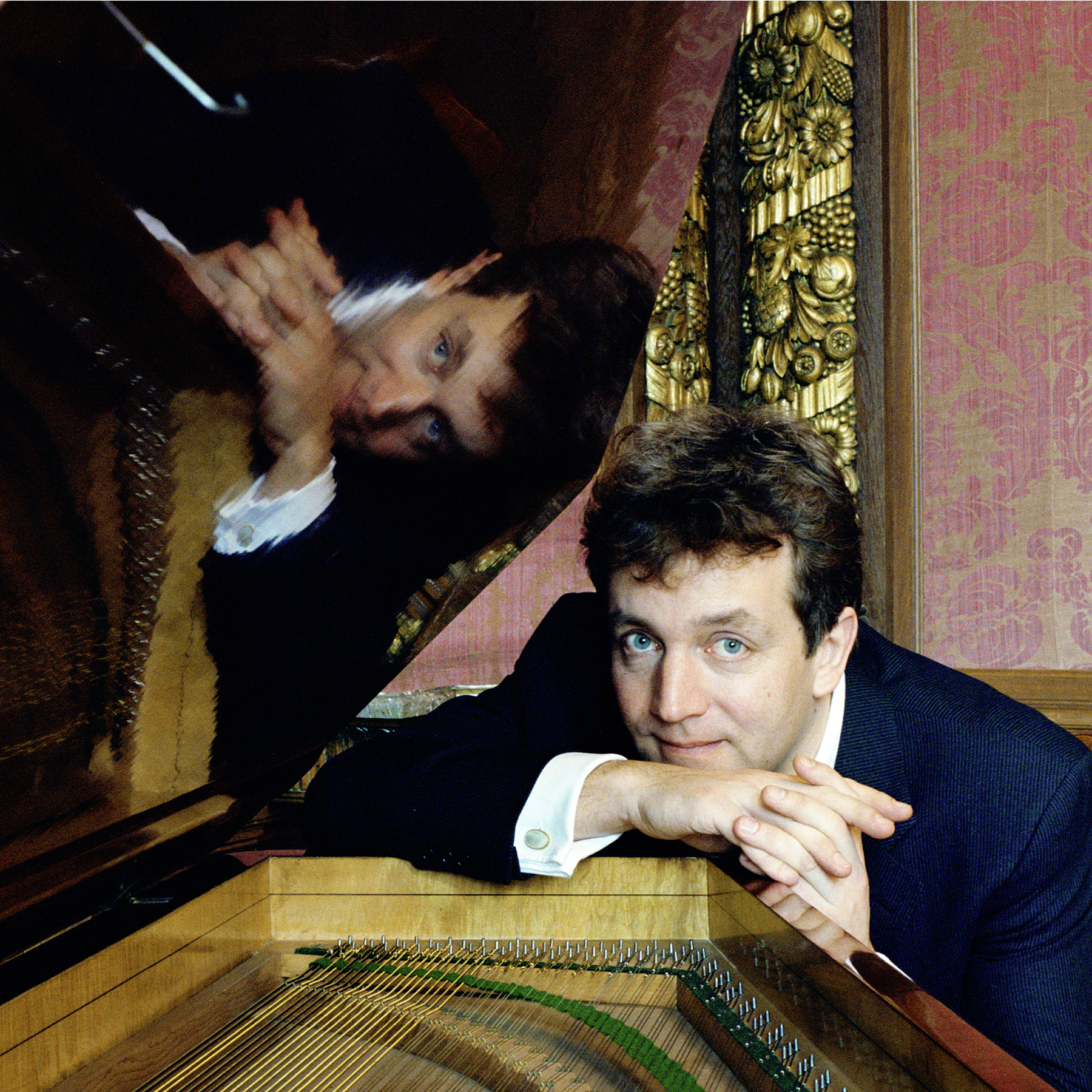
Tobias Koch (2009)

Tobias Koch was born in Kempen. He attended the Robert Schumann Music College in Düsseldorf, and conservatories Vienna, Graz and Brussels.

His chamber music partners include Andreas Staier, Joshua Bell, and Steven Isserlis. He collaborates closely with instrument makers, is on the faculty of the Robert Schumann Hochschule and the Hochschule für Musik Mainz at the Gutenberg University in Mainz, and at the Summer Academy in Montepulciano. He is also a Schumann specialist, in particular within the field of Romantic performance practice.

== Discography ==
Koch's discs include recordings of Chopin, Hiller, Liszt, and other composers of the Romantic period. Several CDs with Tobias Koch have been released by GENUIN
