= Einar Johannessen =

Norwegian radio and television personality

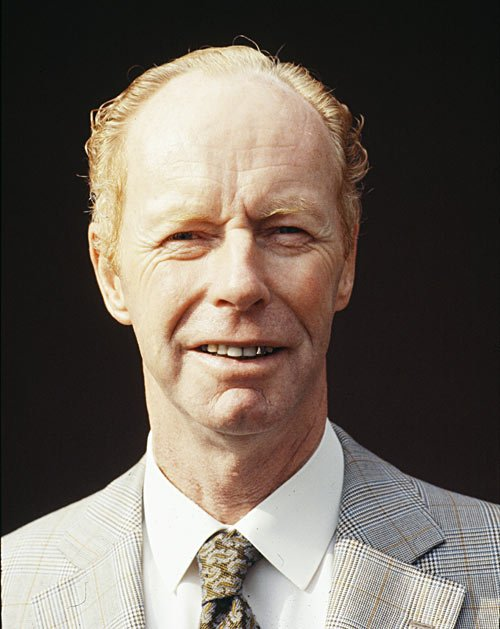
Einar Johan Johannessen, born 09.04.1926, d. 13.01.2016. Picture taken approx. 1978.

Einar Johan Johannessen (9 April 1926 – 13 January 2016) was a Norwegian radio and television personality.

He was born in Halden, and has worked five years as a journalist in Smaalenenes Amtstidende. He took the examen artium in 1947 and graduated from Oslo Teachers' College in 1953, and worked two years as a school teacher. He also worked part-time jobs in the Norwegian Broadcasting Corporation. Among others he worked with Dagsnytt and as a continuity announcer. He then took education at the Norwegian School of Veterinary Science, graduating with the cand.med.vet. degree in 1962. He worked four years as a research assistant and teacher at the School of Veterinary Science.

In 1966 he was hired in the Norwegian Broadcasting Corporation, and anchored Dagsrevyen. He quit Dagsrevyen in 1967, and started working in the public information department. He worked with popular science programs, and especially became known for making medicine-themed orientations. He was often called "the TV doctor" or "the TV physician". From 1972 to 1973 he was on a leave from television and was assisting editor of Tidsskrift for den Norske Lægeforening. In 1977 he was awarded the Riksmål prize Norsk Lytterforenings ærespris. In 1980 he was awarded the Se og Hør readers' TV personality of the year award.

In 1986 a controversy arose. Since August 1985 he had been paid 3000 kr each month by the National Association against Cancer as a consultant. It then became clear that this was against the Norwegian Broadcasting Corporation's rules for secondary jobs. In January 1987 the board of directors, chaired by Halvor Stenstadvold, found Johannessen guilty of breaching the rules. He was stripped of the title as subeditor and was degraded on the wage scale. He was also suspended from presenting a television show for one year. In July the Ministry of Culture, as owner of the Norwegian Broadcasting Corporation, found this to be an illegitimate decision. The board of directors nonetheless chose to uphold the penalty two times, in August and November. In April 1988 the Ministry of Culture definitely overturned the board of directors' decision.

While he was suspended, Johannessen worked for Apotekernes Fællesindkjøp. After he did return, the Director of the Broadcasting Corporation Bjartmar Gjerde declared that he still would not get any airtime. In November 1988 Johannessen applied for a job in the Broadcasting Corporation's district radio in Hedmark. Gjerde then left the position, and in January 1989 Johannessen again appeared in television programs.

He resides in Løten Municipality.

== See also ==
- Einar Lunde, who left the Norwegian Broadcasting Corporation after a controversy with a secondary job.

Awards
Preceded by Odd Grythe	Se og Hør's TV Personality of the Year; 1980	Succeeded by Kari Sørby
