= Smeby =

Smeby is a surname. Notable people with the surname include:

- Helena Olsson Smeby (born 1983), Norwegian ski jumper
- Martin Smeby (1891–1975), Norwegian politician

== See also ==
- Smebye
