= Caroline Fischer =

German-Korean pianist

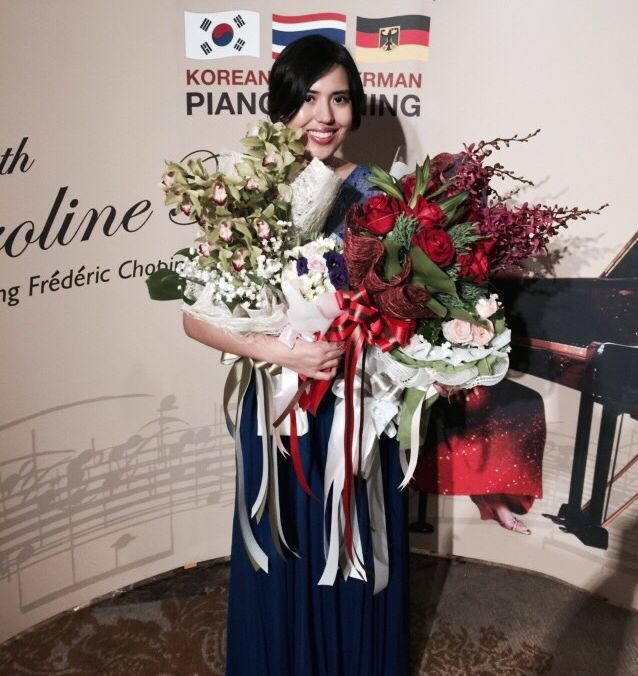
- Fischer in 2015
- Born: 4 April 1984 (age 42); West Berlin, West Germany
- Occupation: Pianist

Caroline Fischer (born April 4, 1984) is a German pianist. She has performed globally and has received numerous awards and prizes.

== Musical education ==
Caroline Fischer received her first piano lessons from her mother at the age of three. At the age of nine, she enrolled in the Julius Stern Institute at the Berlin University of the Arts. She began her studies at the Hochschule für Musik "Hanns Eisler" in Berlin when she was 16, and continued her studies at the Hochschule für Musik und Darstellende Kunst Mannheim in Germany, the Geneva University of Music in Switzerland, and the Norwegian Academy of Music in Oslo, with the professors Pascal Devoyon, Paul Dan, Georg Sava, Ulrich Eisenlohr, and Einar Steen-Nøkleberg. She completed nine degrees (eight diplomas, one master's degree) including two Konzertexamen degrees. In addition to her musical career, Fischer studied cultural and media management at the Hochschule für Musik und Theater Hamburg as well as event management.

Fischer speaks five languages: German, English, French, Korean, and Spanish.

== Concert performances ==
Fischer has given numerous successful concerts in Europe, Asia, South America, and the United States and has performed in major concert halls, such as the Philharmonie Berlin,, Seoul Arts Center,, Shenzhen Concert Hall, Xinghai Concert Hall, Ruhrfestspielhaus Recklinghausen, Theater Wolfsburg, Woori Financial Art Hall Seoul, National Theatre Bangkok, Thailand Cultural Centre, Teatro Municipal de Las Condes Chile, Teatro Nacional de Costa Rica, Wiener Musikverein and the Wiener Konzerthaus. She has played as a soloist with the Berlin Radio Symphony Orchestra, Korean Chamber Orchestra, Berlin Symphony Orchestra, Baden-Baden Philharmonic Orchestra, Orquesta de Cámara de Valdivia, New Symphony Orchestra Berlin, New Philharmonie Westphalia, and at the International Steinway Piano Festival, EXPO Hanover and Yeosu, Beethoven-Festival Bangkok, Korean Festival Seoul, and Schleswig-Holstein Music Festival. Fischer gave concerts during the state visits of the former German Federal President Roman Herzog to South Korea and Mongolia and performed in Bellevue Palace Berlin for former Federal Chancellor Helmut Kohl and Federal Chancellor Angela Merkel.

== Awards ==
Fischer has won 39 prizes and awards (first prizes, gold medals, audience awards) in national and international competitions: Jugend musiziert, International Steinway Piano Competition Berlin, International Queen Sophie Charlotte Competition, International Competition for Young People Berlin, Köster Classic Award-Klassik Radio Hamburg, Lions Club Mannheim Music Competition, Förderpreis Berliner Salon, Vienna Grand Prize Virtuoso, American Protégé International Concerto Competition, On Stage International Classical Music Competition, International Quebec Music Competition, Classic Superstar Award, and received 16 scholarships from renowned foundations: Konrad Adenauer Foundation, Academy of Arts, Berlin, Hans und Eugenia Jütting Foundation, Lutz-E. Adolf Foundation for highly gifted people, Kölner Gymnasial- und Stiftungsfonds, Franz Grothe Foundation, PE-Förderkreis, Gotthard Schierse Foundation, Yehudi Menuhin Live Music Now, etc.

== Teaching activities ==
From 2010 to 2013, Fischer was the assistant piano teacher to Prof. Einar Steen-Nøkleberg at the Norwegian Academy of Music in Oslo and was appointed youngest visiting artist at the Chulalongkorn University in Bangkok. She regularly gives masterclasses in Europe, South America and Asia.

== Discography ==
- Caroline Fischer Piano (2006)
- Lisztomagia (2009)
- Pearls of Classical Music (2017)
- Piano Passion (2017)
- Magical Christmas Fantasies (2023)

All CDs were released by GENUIN.
