= Rolf Bækkelund =

Norwegian conductor and violinist (1925–2024)

- Born: 30 May 1925; Oslo, Norway
- Died: 21 August 2024 (aged 99)
- Occupation(s): Conductor and violinist
- Relatives: Kjell Bækkelund (brother)
- Awards: King's Medal of Merit (1995)

Rolf Bækkelund (30 May 1925 – 21 August 2024) was a Norwegian violinist and conductor.

== Career ==
Bækkelund took lessons with violinist Ernst Glaser at young age. He studied in Prague from 1948, and stayed in Czechoslovakia until 1957. He later worked as musical leader in Molde and in Gjøvik.

He was awarded the King's Medal of Merit in 1995.

== Personal life and death ==
Bækkelund was born in Oslo on 30 May 1925. He was a brother of pianist Kjell Bækkelund.

During the German occupation of Norway he took part in the civil resistance, and was arrested and held in custody at Victoria Terrasse.

Bækkelund died on 21 August 2024, at the age of 99.
