= Kirsten Sørlie =

Norwegian actress and stage director

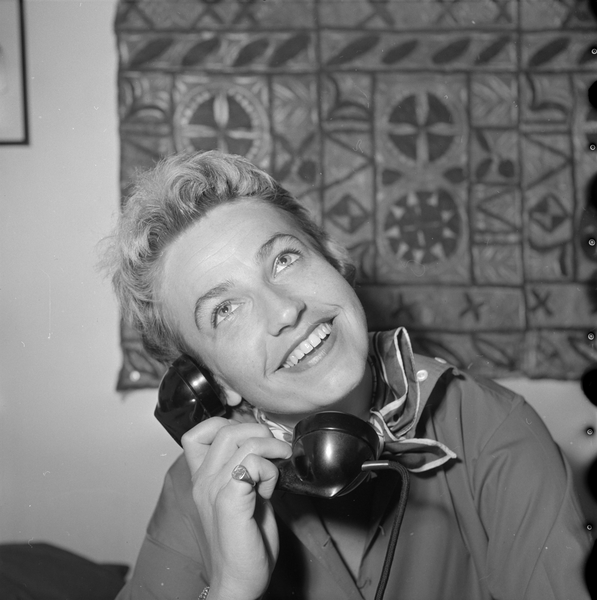
- Born: 5 October 1926; Askim, Norway
- Died: 23 September 2013 (aged 86)
- Education: Ceramist
- Alma mater: Norwegian National Academy of Craft and Art Industry
- Occupations: Actress and stage director
- Spouse: Odd Grythe (m. 1955–1958)
- Children: Hilde Grythe
- Relatives: Terje Tønnesen (son-in-law)

Kirsten Sørlie (5 October 1926 – 23 September 2013) was a Norwegian actress and stage director.

== Early and personal life ==
Sørlie was born in Askim to engineer Erling Thorbjørn Sørlie and Elisabeth Gjersøe . She was married to Odd Grythe from 1955 to 1958. She was the mother of actress Hilde Grythe, and mother-in-law of violinist Terje Tønnesen.

== Career ==
Sørlie was educated as ceramist from the Norwegian National Academy of Craft and Art Industry. She made her stage debut as actress at Centralteatret in 1947. She had further engagements at Det Nye Teater and Edderkoppen in Oslo, and at Lilla Teatern in Helsinki, where she had her first commitment as stage director. Back in Oslo in 1965, she had assignments for Riksteatret, Chat Noir, Nationaltheatret and Oslo Nye Teater. Her stage productions include the musical The Fantasticks, the first staging of Bjørg Vik's play To akter for fem kvinner, and adaptations of Beckett's Happy Days and David Storey's Home.

She died in Oslo on 23 September 2013.
