= Walter Hilgers =

German tubist and conductor (born 1959)

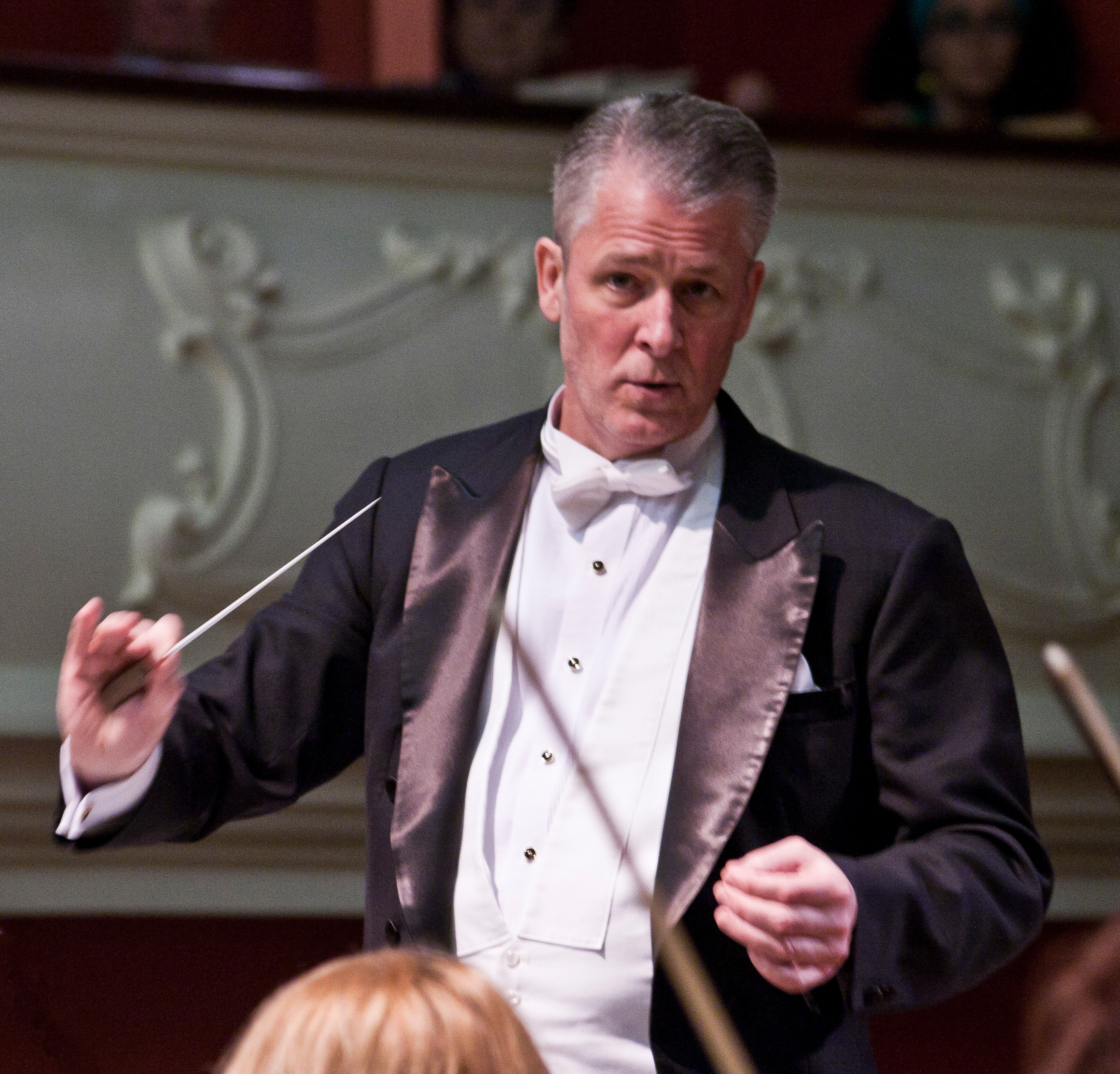
Walter Hilgers in 2013

Walter Hilgers (born 1959 in Stolberg, West Germany) is a German tuba player and conductor. He performs worldwide as orchestral musician, soloist, academic music teacher, arranger and conductor.

== Studies ==
- 1976-1978 Studies at the "University School of Music and Dance Cologne, Institute Aachen" - Tuba, Double Bass and Piano
- Qualification: Artistic Diploma with distinction

== Musical career ==
- 1978 – 1981 Düsseldorf Symphony Orchestra
- 1979 – 1991 Bayreuth Festival
- 1995 – Bayreuth Festival
- 1981 – 1991 Hamburg Philharmonic State Orchestra
- 1982 – 1986 regular guest at Berlin Philharmonic Orchestra
- 1987 – 1991 regular guest at NDR Symphony Orchestra
- 1979 – 2007 brass ensemble German Brass
- 1991 – 1995 NDR Symphony Orchestra
- 2005 – 2007 Vienna Philharmonic Orchestra & Vienna State Opera

== Teaching ==
- 1978 – 1987 Lecturer at the "University School of Music and Dance Cologne"(Aachen and Düsseldorf)
- 1986 – 1988 Lecturer at the Academy of Music, Lübeck
- 1989 – 1995 Professor for tuba and chamber music at the Hamburg Institute of Fine Arts
- Since 1995 Professor for tuba and chamber music at Franz Liszt academy of music in Weimar

== Conducting ==
- Since 2016 Honorar Artistic Director and Permanent Invited Conductor of the "PAUL CONSTANTINESCU" Philharmonic Orchestra Ploieşti
- 2017-2020 Chief Conductor of the Orquesta Sinfónica Provincial de Santa Fé/Argentina
- 2007-2014 Principal Guest Conductor of the State Philharmonic Orchestra Banatul/Timişoara
- Guest conducting engagements:
- Orquesta Sinfónica Montevideo/Uruguay
- Orquesta Sinfónica del Sodre, Montevideo/Uruguay
- Orquesta Sinfónica Nacional Buenos Aires/Argentina
- Orquesta Filarmónica de Buenos Aires/Argentina
- Orquesta Sinfónica Santa Fé/Argentina
- Orquesta Filarmónica de Bogotá/Colombia
- St. Petersburg State Academic Capella Orchestra/Russia
- Radio Chamber Orchestra Bucharest/Romania
- Radio Symphony Orchester Bucharest/Romania
- George Enescu Philharmonic Orchestra Bucharest/Romania
- State Philharmonic Orchestra "Banatul", Timişoara/Romania
- State Philharmonic Orchestra Cluj/ Romania
- State Philharmonic Orchestra Iaşi/ Romania
- State Philharmonic Orchestra Arad/ Romania
- State Philharmonic Orchestra Sibiu/Romania
- State Philharmonic Orchestra Târgu Mureş/ Romania
- State Philharmonic Orchestra Oradea/ Romania
- State Philharmonic Orchestra Craiova/ Romania
- State Philharmonic Orchestra Bacău/ Romania
- Philharmonic Orchestra Ploieşti/Romania
- Philharmonic Orchestra Piteşti/Romania
- Philharmonic Orchestra Muntenia/Târgoviste/Romania
- State Philharmonic Orchestra Košice/Slovakia
- Philharmonic Orchestra Zagreb/Croatia
- Nice Philharmonic Orchestra/France
- International Youth Orchestra Academy
- Brandenburg State Orchestra Frankfurt/Germany
- Leipzig Symphony Orchestra/Germany
- Munich Radio Orchestra/Germany
- Orchestra of the Nationaltheater Mannheim
- Chamber Concerts as a Conductor
- Bavarian State Opera Munich/Germany
- Philharmonic State Orchestra Hamburg/Germany
- German Radio Philharmonic Orchestra Saarbrücken- Kaiserslautern/Germany
- Mecklenburg State Orchestra Schwerin/Germany
- Tritonus Wimares/Germany
- Qatar Philharmonic Orchestra/Qatar
- Daejeon Philharmonic Orchestra/South Korea
- Orquesta de Valencia/Spain
- SODRE Orquesta Montevideo/Uruguay

== CD-Recordings ==
- As Conductor:
  - Internationale Junge Orchesterakademie
    - Mahler, Symphony No.5 (1996)
  - Tritonus Wimares
    - Works by Igor Stravinsky: i.a. Dumbarton Oaks, Pulcinella-Suite, Suites for small Orchestra (MDG 1996)
    - Works by Ervin Schulhoff: i.a. Suite for Chamber Orchestra, Double Concerto for Flute, Piano, Strings and 2 Horns (MDG 2000)
  - Košice State Philharmonic Orchestra, Slovakia
    - Josef Strauss Edition, Vol. 19 (MARCOPOLO 2000)
    - Hymne an die Nacht - Meditative music for Horn and Orchestra (Herder Verlag 2000)
    - "Die Harfe" (Kreuz Verlag 2001)
  - Europe Festival Orchestra
    - Fandango – "Die Gitarre" (Kreuz Verlag 2001)
    - Tastenfieber – "Das Klavier" (Kreuz Verlag 2001)
  - Brandenburg State Orchestra Frankfurt/Germany
    - Works by Ralph Vaughan Williams: Tuba Concerto, Sea Songs and Symphony No.5 as Soloist and Conductor (GENUIN)
  - Orchestra of the Nationaltheater Mannheim
    - Works for Solo Tuba - und Orchester (2017) – Soloist: Siegfried Jung
- Numerous CD recordings as Soloist and member of German Brass
