= Frank Meidell Falch =

Norwegian media director

Frank Meidell Falch (11 August 1920 – 15 December 2013) was a Norwegian media director.

He came from Kvinnherad Municipality. During the occupation of Norway by Nazi Germany he was arrested by the Nazi authorities at the end of June 1942. He was imprisoned in Ulven concentration camp. In November 1943 he was transferred to Sachsenhausen concentration camp, where he remained until the camp was liberated. He was transported back to Norway with the White Buses. After the war he took the cand.mag. degree in 1950 and the cand.philol. degree in 1951.

Falch served as the director of the Bergen International Festival from 1951 to 1957, and was then an editor and district executive in the Norwegian Broadcasting Corporation until 1990. He served as a member of Bergen city council for the Conservative Party.

He was decorated with the Defence Medal 1940–1945 and was a Knight of the Order of the Falcon. He was also a Rotary member since the 1950s, and edited their Nordic magazine Rotary Norden. He died in December 2013.

Cultural offices
Preceded by position created	Director of the Bergen International Festival; 1951–1957	Succeeded by Gunnar Arne Jensen
