= Alvin Ho =

Children's book series

Alvin Ho is a children's book series written by Lenore Look and illustrated by LeUyen Pham. The series follows Alvin Ho, a shy and timid Chinese-American boy in second grade.

The six-part series was published by Random House, beginning with Alvin Ho: Allergic to Girls, School, and Other Scary Things on July 8, 2008, until Alvin Ho: Allergic to the Great Wall, the Forbidden Palace, and Other Tourist Attractions on August 5, 2014.

== Books ==
The six books in the series are as follows:

1. Alvin Ho: Allergic to Girls, School, and Other Scary Things (published on July 8, 2008)
2. Alvin Ho: Allergic to Camping, Hiking, and Other Natural Disasters (June 23, 2009)
3. Alvin Ho: Allergic to Birthday Parties, Science Projects, and Other Man-made Catastrophes (September 28, 2010)
4. Alvin Ho: Allergic to Dead Bodies, Funerals, and Other Fatal Circumstances (September 13, 2011)
5. Alvin Ho: Allergic to Babies, Burglars, and Other Bumps in the Night (April 9, 2013)
6. Alvin Ho: Allergic to the Great Wall, the Forbidden Palace, and Other Tourist Attractions (August 5, 2014)
