= Ada Haug Grythe =

Norwegian journalist

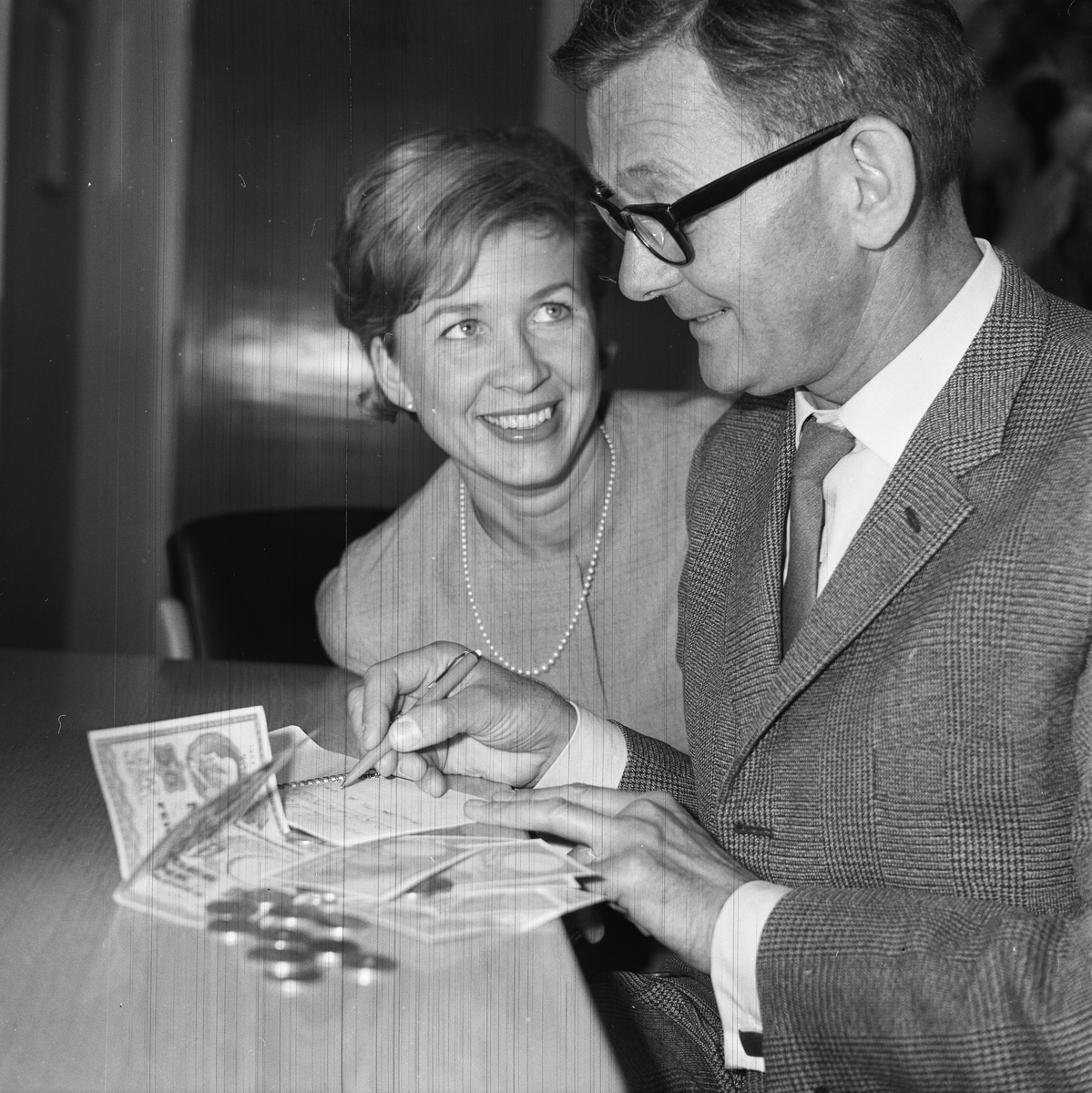
- Ada Haug and Odd Grythe in 1965
- Born: 26 August 1934; Stange, Norway
- Died: 14 August 2014 (aged 79)
- Occupation: Journalist
- Spouse: Odd Grythe

Ada Haug Grythe (26 August 1934 – 14 August 2014) was a Norwegian journalist. She was born in Stange Municipality, and was married to Odd Grythe.

She was assigned to the NRK from 1961, and headed the television department for children and young adults from 1980 to 1991.
