= Hilde Grythe =

Norwegian actress (born 1955)

- Born: 18 July 1955 (age 70); Oslo, Norway
- Occupation: Actress
- Spouse: Terje Tønnesen
- Parents: Odd Grythe (father); Kirsten Sørlie (mother)

Hilde Grythe (born 18 July 1955) is a Norwegian actress.

Grythe was born in Oslo to actress and stage director Kirsten Sørlie and television personality Odd Grythe, and is married to violinist Terje Tønnesen. She was appointed at the Molde theatre Teatret Vårt, Nationaltheatret and Fjernsynsteatret, and eventually worked as freelancer.

Her artistic breakthrough came in 1988 as Hippolyta in an adaptation of A Midsummer Night's Dream at Rogaland Teater. She has played the title role in Knut Hamsun's Viktoria at Nordland Teater, as well as "Nora" in A Doll's House, and "Alexandra" in a stage adaptation of Dostoevsky's novel The Idiot. Her films include Drømmeslottet (1986), Plastposen (1986) and North Star (1996). She took part in the television series Fedrelandet in 1990, and played the character "Skinntryta" in Jul i Blåfjell in 1999.
