= Bø Sommarland =

Waterpark in Norway

- Previously known as Telemark Sommarland
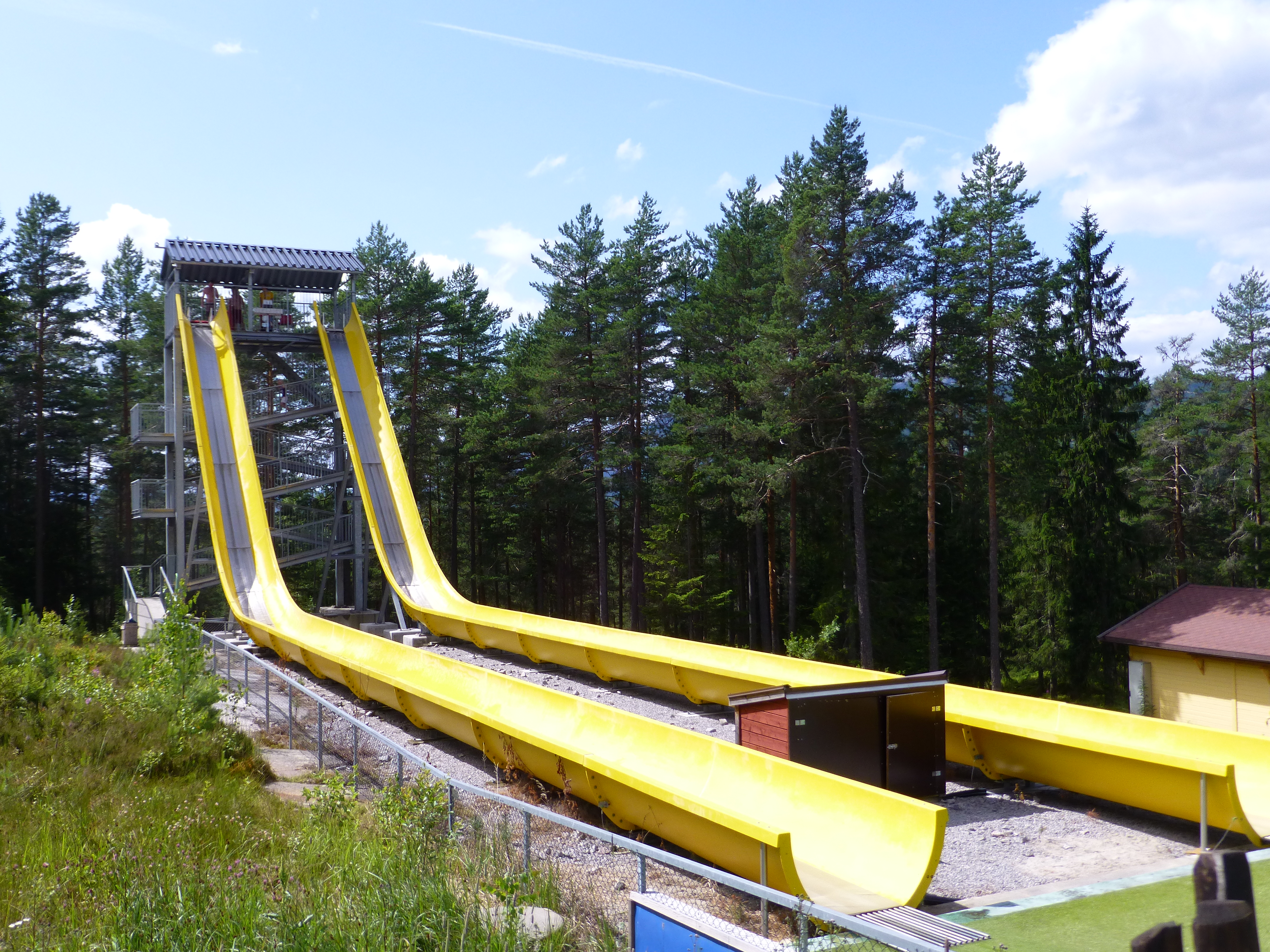
- Interactive map of Bø Sommarland
- Location: Bø, Norway
- Coordinates: 59°26′51″N 9°04′24″E
- Public transit: Sommarland Tjønntveit, Farte routes 116 and 321; Bø Station, Sørland Line
- Opened: 1985
- Owner: Parques Reunidos
- Theme: Water
- Operating season: June-August
- Website: https://www.sommarland.no

Bø Sommarland is one of Europe's biggest water parks, situated in Bø in Midt-Telemark Municipality in Telemark county, Norway. Bø Sommarland is located two hours from Oslo. It is owned by Parques Reunidos, who also owns Tusenfryd, another amusement park in Norway. Every summer around 200,000 people visit Bø Sommarland, which makes the park one of Norway's biggest tourist attractions.

The park opening season is normally from beginning of June to the middle of August.

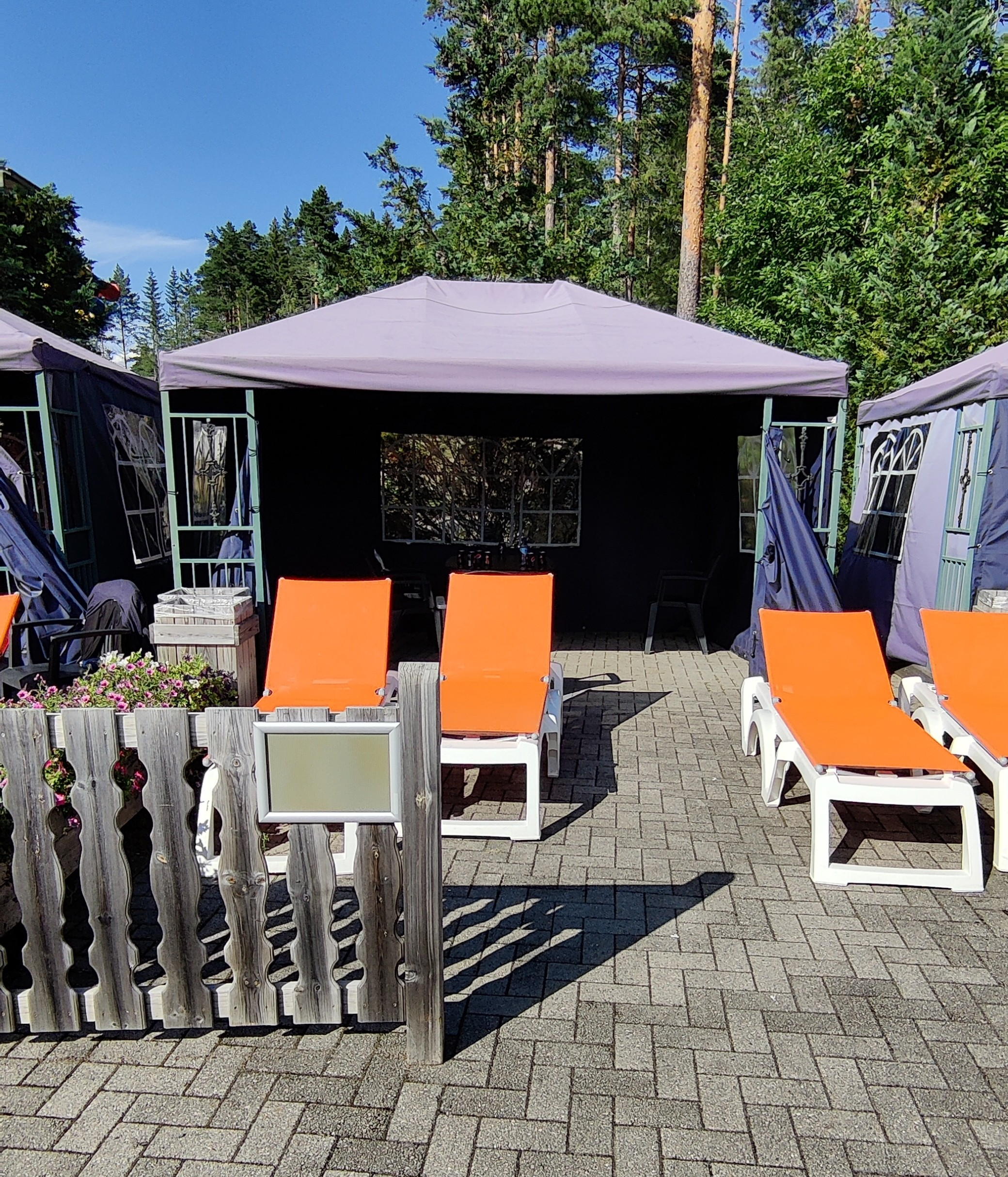
VIP Tent you can rent.

== History ==
Bø Sommarland opened on 27 June 1985 as Telemark Sommarland. It was local forces that developed the park in the "Middle of nowhere".

Sommarland year by year
Season	Number of visitors	What happened
1985	109000	23 June Telemark Sommarland is officially open, Norway biggest amusement park
1986	148,214	Magasuget and a pool for children is ready. NRK transmits several TV broadcasts from the park
1987	155,359	Several famous Norwegian artists perform in the park
1988	115,000	Number of visitors are very low, raining all summer. Sea monster Sjur and Sætra are new attractions.
1989	130,000	First Sommarland Cup in handball
1990	141,000	Hompetitten are the new attraction, last season with show in the Western City.
1991	175,600	Expansion of the children's pool in Vannland.
1992	182,800	A play hall called "Las Bøgas" (from "Las Vegas") is built and Norwegian Championship in pinball games are held.
1993	242,860	Flow Rider, the world's largest artificial waves opens
1994	248,860	Bø Sommarland gets its first webpage
1995	232,240	Bø Sommarland celebrates 10 years
1996	203,056	
1997	248,672	"Mot i Brøstet" are the new attractions and the Western City is transformed into Tivoli Town. World-known surfers like Tony Hawks and Terje Håkonsen are visiting the park to surf in Flow Rider.
1998	177,535	
1999	209,355	Terje Håkonsen together with other celebrities are attending Swatch Wave Tour Bø - San Diego - Dubai
2000	171,897	Sommarland is celebrating 15 year anniversary. Sentrifuga and Space Ball are new attractions.
2001	208,785	Bøverstranden, a big water pool is ready this season.
2002	205,011	Toy Castle Maurtua in Leikeland and beach volleyball
2003	198,500	Bad weather causes flooding in the park. New arrangements of music festivals in the park
2004	220,833	Half pipe is the new attraction, and a new record number visit the park with over 10,000 visitors in one day.
2005	178,000	Norwegian championship in gravity racer, and the park celebrate 20 year anniversary.
2006	205,000	Jettegryta is the new attraction. Parques Reunidos are the new owner of Bø Sommarland.
2007	141,000	Splash is the new attraction
2008	165,000	New management
2009	149,511	Upgrading the catering and several attractions in the park.
2010	152,408	Vassføyka is the new attraction
2011	116,540	Upgrading of minigolf, Tacky Summer Invitational is a big event and a Guinness record attempt in the park with Andreas Wahl, which holds the world's largest science class.
2012	95,900	
2013	129,000	Trippeltrakta is the new attraction

== Attractions in the park ==
=== Jettegryta (2006) ===
Jettegryta, "Pothole", is one of the biggest slides in Bø Summerland. Two and two are sitting in a boat starting at high speed through a tube before they enter an open pan. Slide is over 100 meters long and has a fall of more than 16 meters.

=== Half pipe (2004) ===
The Half pipe is one of Europe's biggest half pipes in water with a height difference of 19 meters.

=== Flow Rider (1994) ===
Flow Rider is the world's largest artificial surf wave. The artificial surf wave is related to Summerland river where it every hour a wave is released.

=== Mot i Brøstet (1997) ===
Mot i Brøstet was the world's first roller coaster in water when it was built in 1997. Today it is Europe's biggest water roller coaster. The slide is named and licensed for the Norwegian sitcom of the same name, though the ride otherwise has nothing to do with the sitcom.

=== Magasuget (1986) ===
Magasuget is a ride that starts 26 meters over the ground with freefall of 9 meters.

=== Leikeland ===
Leikeland is the playground for children. You will find climbing castles, electric cars, fairytale houses, slides, jumping castles, mini golf and other dry attraction for children.

== Videos ==
- Rekordforsøk med Andreas Wahl
- Tacky Summer Invitational 2011
- TV-reklame
