= Odd Grythe =

Norwegian radio and television personality

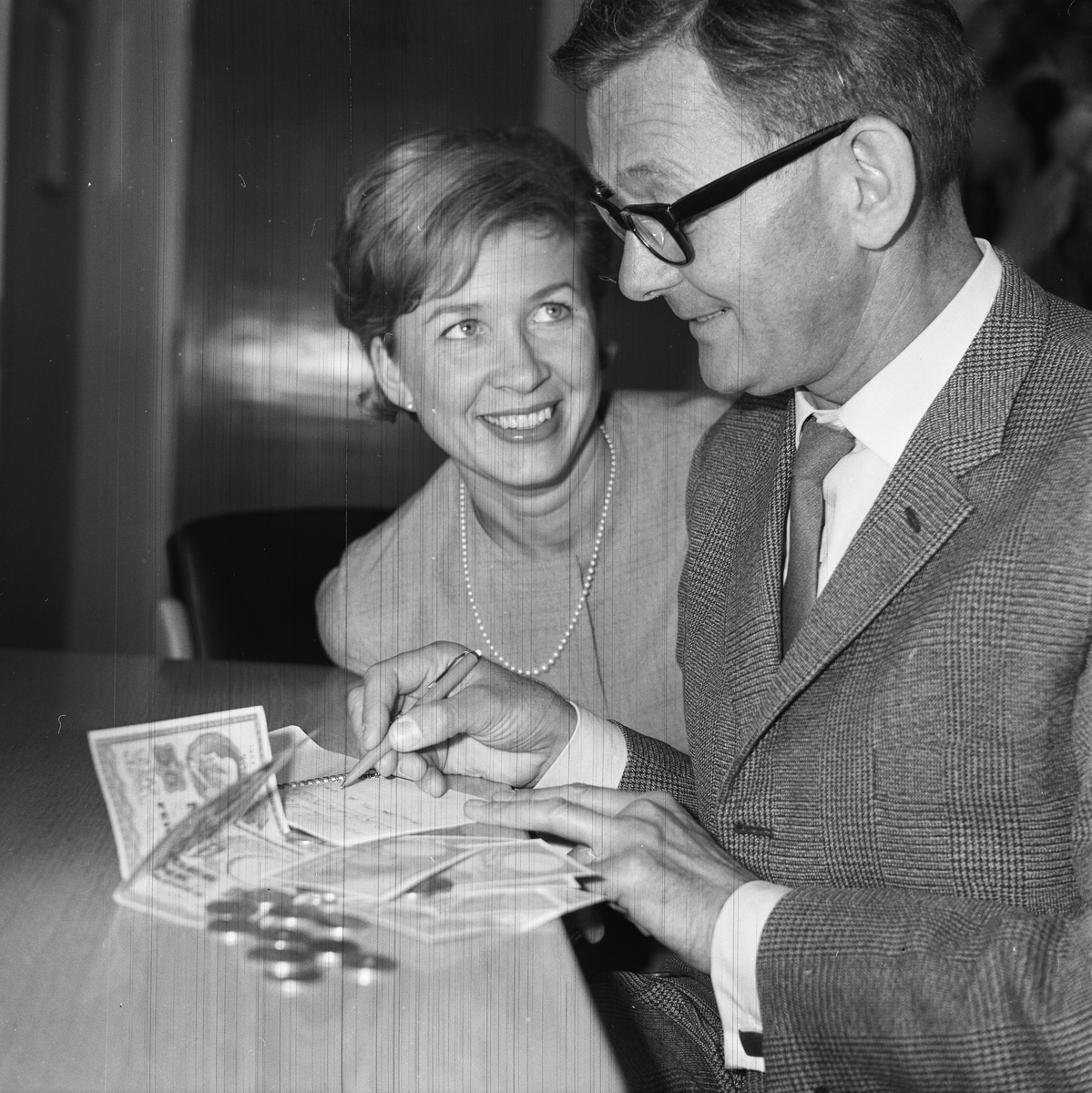
Ada Haug and Odd Grythe in 1965

Odd Horn Grythe (14 November 1918 – 7 February 1995) was a Norwegian radio and television personality.

== Personal life ==
He was born in Lillehammer as a son of a travelling salesman. He had four older siblings. From 1955 to 1958 he was married to Kirsten Sørlie. In March 1962 he married Ada Haug. With his first wife he had the daughter Hilde Grythe, who married Terje Tønnesen.

== Career ==
He finished his secondary education in his hometown, and then moved to Oslo. He worked different office jobs, and also for a short time at Centralteatret. During the Second World War he was a part of the Norwegian resistance movement in Lillehammer. He was arrested on 23 March 1945 and was imprisoned in Grini concentration camp from 13 April 1945 until the war's end. After the war, Grythe was a journalist and subeditor in Dagningen from 1946 to 1950. He was also a city council member for the Labour Party. He worked in Lillehammer og omlands tiltaksråd from 1950 to 1953, and from 1953 to 1959 as a film producing assistant and producer.

In 1959 he was hired as program secretary in Norwegian Broadcasting Corporation radio. On 20 August 1960 he hosted the first show after the official opening of Norwegian television, Startskuddet går. He hosted the Melodi Grand Prix in 1960 (with Erik Diesen), 1961 (with Erik Diesen), 1962, 1963, 1964 and 1965. In 1961 he was officially transferred from the radio department to television, and from 1966 to 1971 he headed the information department. From October 1971 to his retirement in 1985 he hosted the show Husker du..., an entertainment show for the elderly with revue performances, evergreens and musical numbers of the past. In 1979 he was awarded the second Se og Hør readers' TV personality of the year award. He also received the Humanist Prize from the Norwegian Humanist Association in 1989.

Part of his qualifications for the job stemmed from him touring retirement homes and sanatoria with musical acts. He continued doing so after retiring from television. In 1988 he released his memoirs, Dette husker jeg... (a play on Husker du...). He died in February 1995 in Oslo.

Awards
Preceded by Erik Bye	Se og Hør's TV Personality of the Year; 1979	Succeeded by Einar Johannessen
