= Jan Henrik Kayser =

Norwegian pianist

- Born: 20 February 1933; Bergen, Norway
- Died: 24 April 2016 (aged 83)
- Occupation: Pianist
- Awards: Princess Astrid Music Award in 1961; Griegprisen in 1978

Jan Henrik Kayser (20 February 1933 – 24 April 2016) was a Norwegian classical pianist.

== Life and career ==
Kayser was born in Bergen. He made his concert debut in 1953, and is known as performer of Harald Sæverud's compositions. He was awarded the Princess Astrid Music Award in 1961, and the Griegprisen in 1978.

Kayser died on 24 April 2016, at the age of 83.
