= Alexandra Dovgan =

Russian pianist

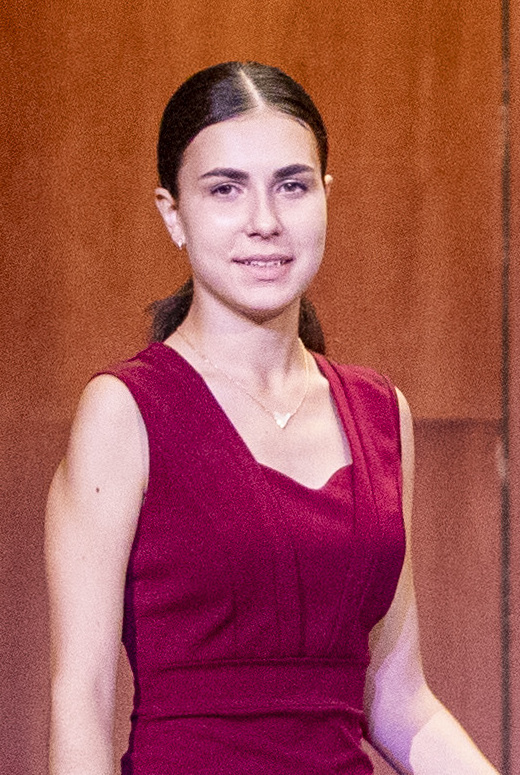

Background information
- Born: Aleksandra Sergeevna Dovgan; July 1, 2007 (age 18)
- Origin: Moscow, Russia
- Genres: Classical music
- Occupation: Musician
- Instrument: Piano

Aleksandra Sergeevna Dovgan (Russian: Александра Сергеевна Довгань; born July 1, 2007) is a Russian pianist.

== Education ==
Dovgan's parents are musicians. She started her piano lessons at the age of four. At five, she was accepted at the Moscow Conservatory with Mira Marchenko as her teacher. Her education was supported, among others, by Grigory Sokolov and the Vladimir Spivakov Foundation. After the Russian invasion of Ukraine, she relocated to Málaga, Spain.

== Career ==
As a youth, Dovgan has already performed in Europe at many major concert halls. Together with Denis Matsuev and Valery Gergiev, she opened the Mariinsky International Piano Festival in St. Petersburg in 2018. In 2019, at the age of 11, Dovgan participated in the opening of the "Russian Seasons Germany" with the Berlin Philharmonic. Subsequently, appearances were at the Munich Prinzregententheater, the Concertgebouw, Amsterdam, the Théâtre des Champs-Élysées, the Wiener Konzerthaus, the Pierre-Boulez-Saal, Berlin, the Tonhalle Zürich, and others. She performed at the Salzburger Festspiele, the Klavier-Festival Ruhr, and the Rheingau Musik Festival. Some notable international orchestras Dovgan worked with include the Orchestra della Svizzera Italiana, the Slovenian Philharmonic, the Kungliga Filharmoniska Orkestern, Orquestra Simfònica de Barcelona i Nacional de Catalunya, the Orquestra Nacional de Espana, the London Philharmonic, and the Gulbenkian Orchestra in Lisbon.

Rudolf Buchbinder wrote at the occasion of her being the recipient of the 2024 Prix Serdang : "With her incredible talent and hard work, she has developed into an outstanding pianist of her generation... with her technical brilliance, musical sensitivity and expressiveness, she inspires her audience again and again; her interpretations are characterized by a deep, emotional intensity and touch the hearts of the audience."

== Awards ==
- 2024: Prix Serdang (Switzerland)
