= Bodil Arnesen =

Norwegian operatic soprano

Bodil Victoria Arnesen Harstad) is a Norwegian operatic soprano who studied music in Stavanger and Munich.

Arnesen has had opera and concert engagements in Europe, USA and Asia and has recorded several albums. She has been awarded several music awards.

== Prizes ==
- 1989: Princess Astrid Music Prize
- 1990: ARD International Music Competition
- 1991: Kirsten Flagstad Prize
- 1994: Mirjam Helin International singing competition
- 2000: Griegprisen

== Discography (selection) ==
- 1994: Alnæs: Songs
- 1997: Grieg: Songs
- 1998: Sinding: Songs
- 2000: Julens Beste
- 2001: Det er jul
- 2003: Fader Vår, mine beste salmer
- 2006: Con Sentimento
- 2009: Voice in the air
