= Einar Steen-Nøkleberg =

Norwegian classical pianist

- Born: 25 April 1944 (age 81); Østre Toten Municipality, Norway
- Occupations: Classical pianist and musical pedagogue
- Awards: Norwegian Music Critics Award; Spellemannprisen; Griegprisen; Order of St. Olav

Einar Steen-Nøkleberg (born 25 April 1944) is a Norwegian classical pianist and musical pedagogue.

== Early life ==
Steen-Nøkleberg was born in Østre Toten Municipality to farmer Jacob Steen-Nøkleberg and Signe Sveen. He has recorded more than fifty albums, and toured all over Europe, in America, Asia, and the Soviet Union.

== Career ==
He was appointed professor at the Hochschule für Musik, Theater und Medien Hannover from 1975 to 1982, and professor at the Norwegian Academy of Music from 1982. He was awarded the Norwegian Music Critics Award 1975, Spellemannprisen 1976, Lindemanprisen 1987, and Griegprisen in 1988. He was decorated Knight, First Class of the Order of St. Olav in 1993.

Among his students were i.a. Caroline Fischer and Serouj Kradjian.
