= Bjarne Brustad =

Norwegian musician (1895–1978)

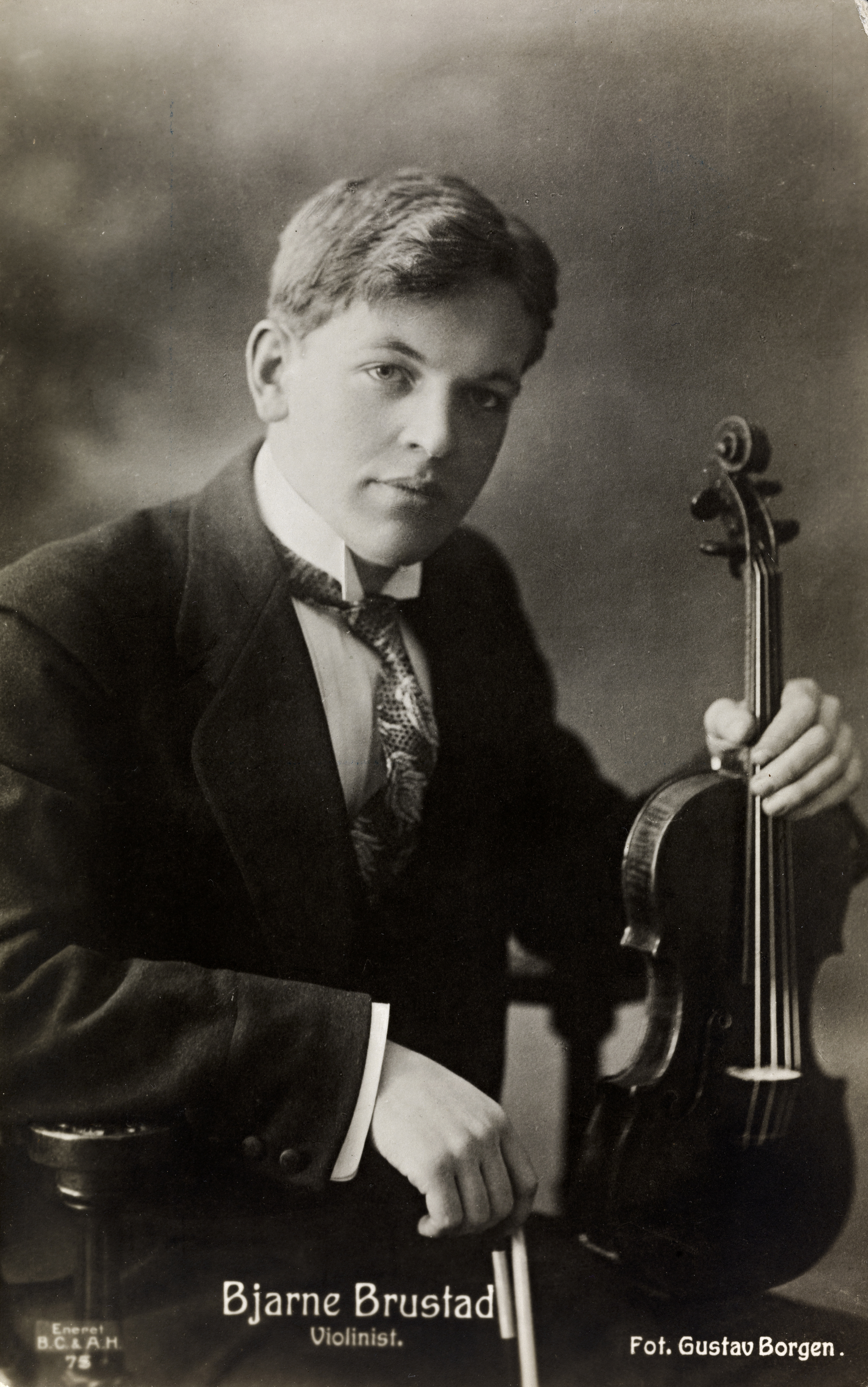
- Born: 4 March 1895; Kristiania, Norway
- Died: 20 May 1978 (aged 83)
- Occupations: Composer, violinist and violist

Trollkvenna (Troll's Mill)
This sample of Brustad's music is the fourth movement of the Eventyrsuite (Fairy Tale Suite) for violin (1932)

Bjarne Brustad (4 March 1895 – 20 May 1978) was a Norwegian composer, violinist and violist. He was born in Kristiania, now Oslo. He played with symphonic orchestras in Stavanger and Oslo. In the 1920s he travelled to European cities such as Paris, Munich and Berlin, where he received musical inspiration and contacts. From 1928 to 1943, Brustad was viola soloist with Philharmonic Society Orchestra in Oslo. He wrote symphonies, compositions for violin and orchestra, chamber music and opera. His opera Atlantis was finished in 1945. After World War II he was also active in organizing work.

As a teacher at the Oslo Conservatory of Music, his students included Bjørn Fongaard and Trond Øyen. He died in Oslo.

== Selected works ==
Stage

- Atlantis, Opera (1945)

Orchestral

- Suite No. 1 (1920)
- Berceuse and Waltz for chamber orchestra
- Perpetum Mobile for chamber orchestra (1924, revised 1958)
- Norsk Suite (Norwegian Suite) (1926, 1961); original version for viola and piano
- Concerto Grosso: En studie (1938)
- Symphony No. 1 (1948)
- Ouvertyre (Overture) (1950)
- Symphony No. 2 (1951)
- Suite No. 2 (1952)
- Symphony No. 3 (1953)
- Kinderspiele, Suite for chamber orchestra (1955)
- Cabaret for chamber orchestra (1958)
- Day-Dreams for chamber orchestra (1958)
- French Suite for chamber orchestra
- Suite (1959)
- Symphony No. 4 (1967)
- Symphony No. 5 (1967)
- Symphony No. 6 (1970)
- Symphony No. 7 (1972)
- Symphony No. 8 (1972)
- Symphony No. 9 (1973)

Concertante

- Concerto No. 1 for violin and orchestra (1922)
- Concerto No. 2 for violin and orchestra (1927)
- Concertino for viola and chamber orchestra (1932)
- Rapsodi (Rhapsody) for violin and orchestra, Op. 19 (1933)
- Concerto No. 3 for violin and orchestra; unfinished
- Vore jag et litet barn for violin and orchestra (1958)
- Concerto No. 4 for violin and orchestra (1961)
- Concerto for clarinet and string orchestra (1969)

Chamber music

- Berceuse for violin and piano
- Poeme for violin and piano
- Nature Morte, Parodie for string quartet (1926)
- Norsk Suite (Norwegian Suite) for viola and piano (1926); also for orchestra
- Capricci for violin and viola (1931)
- Partita for viola (1931, revised 1957)
- Eventyrsuite (Fairy Tale Suite) for violin (1932)

1. Natur og hulder (Nature and Hulder)
2. Veslefrikk
3. Sull (Song)
4. Trollkvenna (Troll's Mill)

- Sonata No. 1 for violin (1935, revised 1958)
- Trio [No. 1] for clarinet, violin and viola (1938)
- Fanitullsuite (Devil Suite) for violin (1946)

1. Hildring
2. Huldrespill
3. Likferd
4. Fanitul

- Serenade, Trio No. 2 for violin, clarinet and bassoon (1947)
- Sonata for violin and piano (1950)
- Sonata No. 2 for violin (1956)
- Sonata No. 3 for violin (1957)
- Divertimento for flute (1958)
- String Quartet No. 3 (1959)
- Serenade for flute, oboe, clarinet, horn and bassoon (1969)

Piano

- Fra barnets verden (From a Child's World; Kinderspiele) (1934)
- Pièce héroique

Vocal

- Hugen for voice and piano (1912); words by Ivar Aasen
- Bånsull fra Sunndalen (Lullaby from Sunndalen) for voice and piano (1921)
- Et barn (A Child) for voice and piano (1948); words by Arnulf Øverland
- Berceuse for soprano and orchestra
- Did You Cry...? for voice and string orchestra; words by Ingeborg Boyine Flood (1901–1963)
- Stærvise for soprano or tenor and piano
