= Oslo Conservatory of Music =

Music school in Oslo, Norway

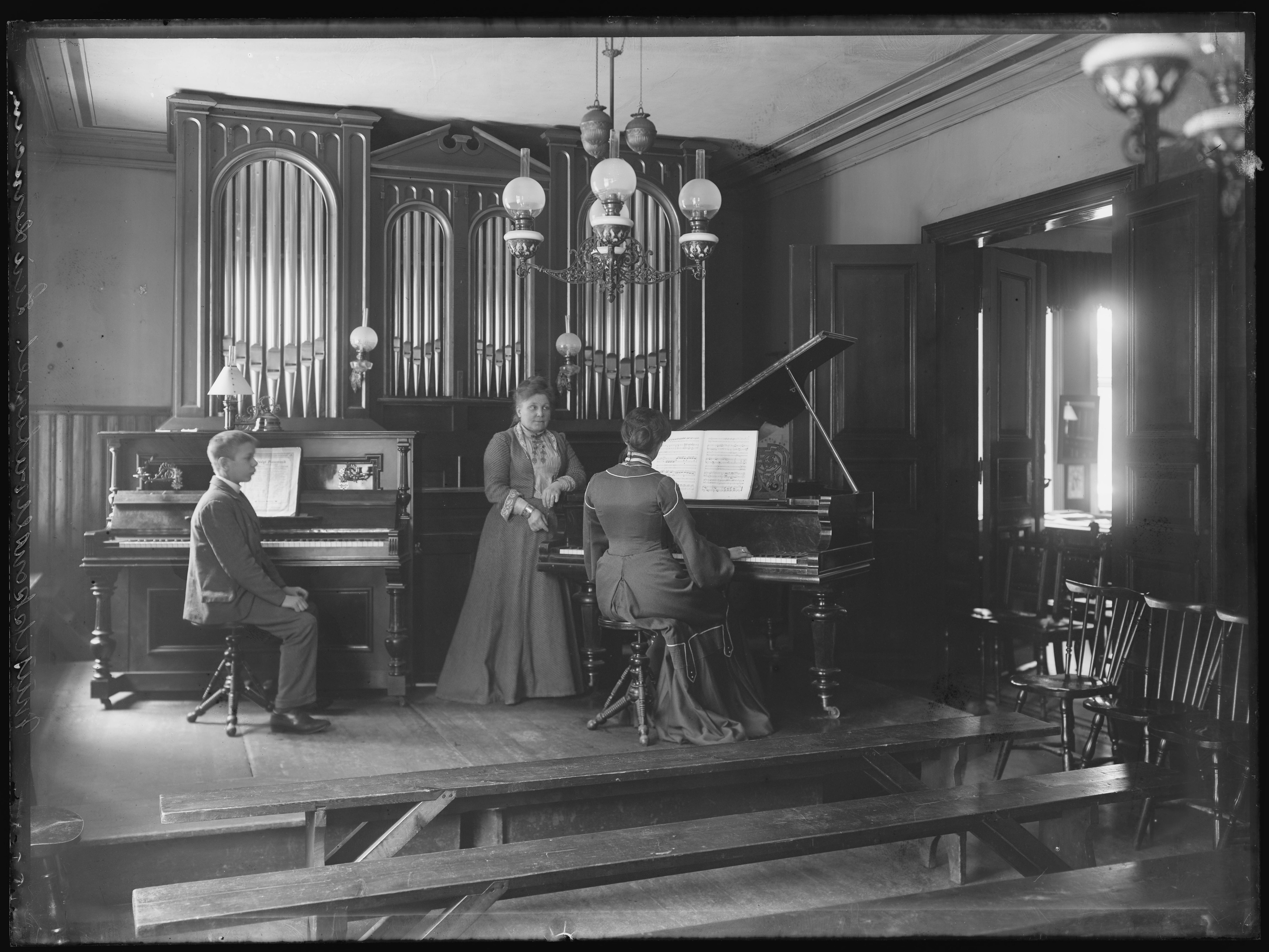
Musikkonservatoriet (Lindeman)

The Oslo Conservatory of Music (Norwegian: Musikkonservatoriet i Oslo) was a music school in Oslo, Norway.

The school was established by Ludvig Mathias Lindeman and his son Peter Brynie Lindeman in 1883 in Christiania (as Oslo was then called) and was named the Organist School (Norwegian: Organistskolen). In 1885 it had 174 students and was renamed the Music and Organist School. Peter Brynie Lindeman took over leadership of the school after his father's death in 1887. The school was renamed again in 1892 to the Christiania Music Conservatory, and it was the only institution of its kind in Norway until 1905. Peter's son Trygve Lindeman (1896–1979), who studied music in Stockholm, became a teacher at the school in 1921 and became its head in 1930. Trygve Lindeman retired in the 1960s and management was transferred to the Lindeman Foundation (Norwegian: Lindemans Legat). From 1969 to 1973, the conservatory was operated in a partnership between the foundation and the government. The school offered a mix of professional training of musicians, and amateur education for children and adults. The conservatory closed in 1973, when the Norwegian Academy of Music was established.

The Conservatory of Music Archives were administered by the Lindeman Foundation until 2013, when they were transferred to the National Archives of Norway. The archives consist of teaching records with student and teacher schedules, evening performances by students, the music conservatory society, and a series of leaving assessments of students. It also contains some accounting records, including student payments and salary records. The materials cover the period from the school's establishment in 1883 until it started being shut down in 1969/70.

== Notable alumni ==
Notable people that attended the Oslo Conservatory of Music include:

- Geir Henning Braaten (born 1944), pianist
- Bjørn G. Gjerstrøm (1939–2017), composer
- Trond Kverno (born 1945), composer
- Trygve Lindeman (1896–1979), cellist and the head of the conservatory
- Kari Løvaas (born 1939), soprano
- Finn Mortensen (1922–1983), composer
- Knut Nystedt (1915-2014), composer
- Anfinn Øien (born 1922), organist and music teacher
- Per Steenberg (1870–1947), organist and composer
- Fartein Valen (1887–1952), composer
