= Njål Sparbo =

Norwegian classical bass-baritone singer and artistic researcher (born 1964)

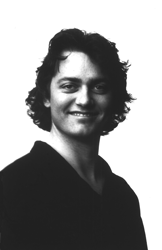
Njål Sparbo

Njål Sparbo (born 13 May 1964) is a Norwegian classical bass-baritone singer, conductor and artistic researcher.

== Early life and education ==
Sparbo was educated in Oslo and studied singing with Jan Sødal, Aase Nordmo Løvberg, Ingrid Bjoner and Tor Hommeren. He also attended master classes with Hans Hotter, Dietrich Fischer-Dieskau, Kurt Moll, Jorma Hynninen, Edith Mathis, Galina Vishnevskaya and Oren Brown.

== Career ==
Sparbo has performed a wide repertoire of oratorio works and has appeared in opera productions and contemporary music performances, including numerous world premieres. He has appeared with major Norwegian choirs and orchestras and has performed internationally in Europe, Russia, the United States, Japan and South Korea.

As a recital singer, he has given more than 150 Lieder recitals and has recorded "Winterreise" by Franz Schubert and recordings devoted to Edvard Grieg and Norwegian song.

In conjunction with the centenary of Edvard Grieg's death in 2007, Sparbo performed all of Grieg's 172 songs in a series of seven concerts in Bergen.

Among his performances are Gustav Mahler's Lieder eines fahrenden Gesellen with the Academy of St Martin in the Fields in London, Bach's Christmas Oratorio with the Drottningholm Baroque Ensemble in Sweden, Rossini's Petite messe solennelle at the Kölner Philharmonie, Trond Kverno's St Matthew Passion in New York, and the role of Manoah in Handel's Samson at the London Handel Festival.

His discography comprises more than thirty recordings, including recordings devoted to Norwegian song and contemporary music.

== Awards and honours ==
Sparbo has received a number of scholarships and awards, including the Kirsten Flagstad Prize and the Grieg Prize from Troldhaugen.

In 2009 he was awarded the Grieg Prize for his interpretation of the songs of Edvard Grieg and his contribution to renewing the performance tradition of Grieg's vocal music.

== Research and teaching ==
Sparbo held the Norwegian Government Grant for Artists from 1997 to 1999 and from 2005 to 2008 in connection with studies of art song and contemporary Norwegian vocal repertoire.

From 2009 to 2014 he was a research fellow at the Oslo National Academy of the Arts in the Norwegian Artistic Research Fellowship Programme with the project Singing on the Stage – with a Psychophysical Approach.

In 2014–15 he participated in the research project The Reflective Musician – Interpretation as Co-Creative Process at the Norwegian Academy of Music.

From 2017 to 2020 he participated in the artistic research project (Un-)settling Sites and Styles: Performers in Search of New Expressive Means at the University of Bergen, including the sub-project Sonotical Interpretations of 70 Songs by Geirr Tveitt.

His research has focused on psychophysical stage presence, artistic interpretation and relationships between voice, embodiment and contemporary aesthetics.

Sparbo has served as an associate professor at the Academy of Opera and the Academy of Dance at the Oslo National Academy of the Arts and at The University of Bergen (The Grieg Academy). He has supervised choirs and vocal ensembles, including the Oslo Philharmonic Choir.

== Other activities ==
Sparbo has served as a peer reviewer for artistic research projects at the Norwegian Academy of Music, the Norwegian University of Science and Technology and the University College of Opera in Stockholm. He has also served on the scholarship committee of the Norwegian Artists' Union.

He has been a board member of the International Grieg Society, managing director of the Oslo Grieg Society, festival director of the Oslo Grieg Festival and a member of the Norwegian Operatic Association.

He is the founder of the record label Quattro Records.

== Selected discography ==
- Winterreise (with Einar Steen-Nøkleberg)
- Grieg & Schubert: Songs (with Einar Steen-Nøkleberg)
- Norge, mitt Norge!
- Natt og Dag
- Verdens veier
- Tida veit
