= Geir Henning Braaten =

Norwegian pianist

Geir Henning Braaten (born 29 October 1944 in Odalen) is a Norwegian pianist. In Oslo, he studied with Nicolai Dirdal from age five, and later with Robert Riefling, both at the Oslo Conservatory of Music. He also studied in France with Yvonne Lefébure, with Bruno Seidlhofer in Vienna. He debuted in 1966 and has toured widely, especially in the east, including Turkey, Yugoslavia, France, USSR, U.S., Korea, Middle East and Taiwan. He has performed on Hong Kong radio and played with the Tokyo Symphony Orchestra. Braaten has collaborated with conductors including Moshe Atzmon, Aldo Ceccato, Mariss Jansons, Ken-Ichiro Kobayashi and Walter Weller. His complete edition of Grieg gave rise to concerts with the Royal Philharmonic Orchestra and won the prestigious MIDEM award. He has had a close collaboration with world renowned violinist Aaron Rosand. He has retired from his position associate professor at the Norwegian Academy of Music, but continues his busy concert schedule, both as soloist and in chamber music with violinist Ole Bohn among others.

== Releases ==
- Edvard Grieg, complete piano music, vol. I–VII (Twelve CDs, Victoria, 1993). The Grieg anniversary.
- Arietta and variations (Pro Musica, 2005). With Per Øien and Robert Aitken flute. Music by Franz and Karl Doppler.
- Xmas greetings from the piano ( Simax, 2006)

== Awards ==
- Princess Astrid Music Prize 1967
- Prizewinner in the Concours Debussy in Saint-Germain-en-Laye 1977
- Medal in the Maria Canals International Music Competition in Barcelona, Spain 1972
- Best Special Edition, Reed Midem Organization 1995
- Gammleng Award 1997 in the "Classic" category.
