= Lilleborg Church =

- Lilleborg kirke
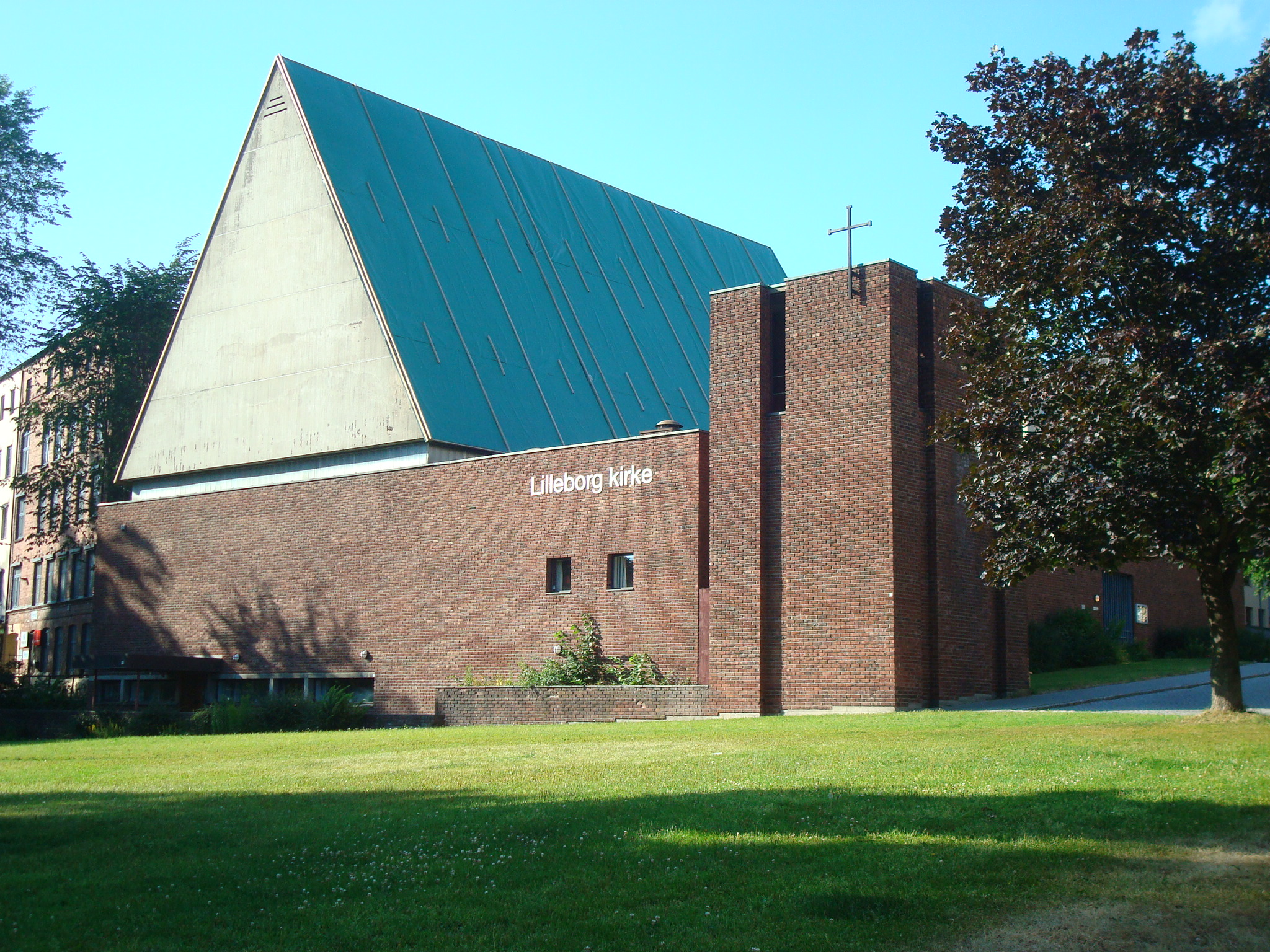

- Location within Oslo Location within Norway
- 59°55′53.674″N 10°45′56.329″E
- Location: Oskar Braatens gate 35, Oslo,
- Country: Norway
- Denomination: Church of Norway
- Churchmanship: Evangelical Lutheran
- Website: kirken.no

History
- Status: Parish church
- Consecrated: 1966

Architecture
- Functional status: Active
- Architect: Harald Hille

Specifications
- Capacity: 410 + 216 seats
- Materials: Concrete and brick

Administration
- Diocese: Diocese of Oslo
- Parish: Torshov og Lilleborg

Lilleborg Church is a church in Oslo, Norway.

The church was designed by architect Harald Hille and was consecrated by the bishop in 1966. There are 410 seats in the church room itself and 216 in the adjoining parish hall. The material is concrete and brick, and the church ship itself has a rectangular shape and steep eaves.

The altarpiece, with the motif "Christ and the world", is painted by Olav Strømme.

Stained glass on the baptismal font and on the long wall are created by Finn Christensen. There is also a stained glass window by Kjell Pahr-Iversen. The pulpit and baptismal font are in concrete and designed by the architect, and the baptismal dish is in glass from Hadeland Glassverk.

The church organ is from 1981 and was reviewed in 2012.

The bell tower is close to the church and has three church bells.

The church is listed by the Norwegian Directorate for Cultural Heritage.
