= Kjell Bækkelund =

Norwegian classical pianist

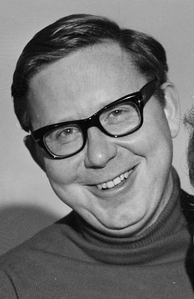
Kjell Bækkelund in 1966

Kjell Bækkelund (6 May 1930 – 13 May 2004) was a Norwegian classical pianist.

== Biography ==
Bækkelund was born in Oslo, Norway. He was the son of Martin Bækkelund (1903–66) and Rallik Antonette Hansen (1904–94). He was a student at the Oslo Conservatory of Music from 1935 until 1944. His brother Rolf was a violinist and conductor.

Bækkelund debuted as a prodigy in 1938 with the Oslo Philharmonic Orchestra at the age of eight. After the Second World War, he trained with Gottfrid Boon (1886–1981) in Stockholm. In 1953 Bækkelund won first prize in the Scandinavian Musicians' Festival held at Trondheim. That same year, he was granted the Harriet Cohen Memorial Music Award for young professional musicians of outstanding promise. Subsequently, he studied for three years with Ilona Kabos in London. He followed with study under the direction of German classical pianists, Hans Richter-Haaser and Wilhelm Kempff. From the beginning of the 1960s, he performed several worldwide concert tours with the main emphasis of his repertoire consisting of baroque and the classic-romantic music.
