= Einar Henning Smebye =

Norwegian pianist and music teacher (born 1950)

Einar Henning Smebye (born 29 November 1950, in Oslo) is a Norwegian pianist and music teacher.

Smebye studied under Nicolai Dirdal and Hildegunn Reuter in Oslo, where he debuted with César Franck's Symphony variations, accompanied by Endre Kleve on violin (1968). Later he studied in Vienna with Bruno Seidlhofer, and in Paris with Germaine Mounier. He became a teacher at the Østlandets Musikkonservatorium (1977) and professor in piano at the Norwegian College of Music (1995).

Smebye is the son of Sverre Henning Smebye.
