= Hardanger Musikkfest =

Annua music festival in Norway

Hardanger Musikkfest or The Hardanger Music Festival is an annual music festival. In November 2021, media wrote that it is scheduled for later that month.

Previously it had been held every Pentecost since 1996. In June, Hardanger Musikkfest arranges about 40 concerts over five days in Hardanger, specifically in Ullensvang Municipality and Eidfjord Municipality.

The festival program mainly comprises Chamber music and Contemporary folke music from Hardanger and Norway in general. At the Hardanger conference in Ulvik Municipality it was announced byTora Augestad that 'Hiking' will be the theme of the festival in 2019.

The main base at the Hardanger Music Festival is in Lofthus in Ullensvang, the largest venues are Fjordahallen in Kinsarvik and Kraftkatedalen in Tyssedal.

Each year a number of renowned Norwegian and international musicians play at Hardanger Music Festival. These have included Oslo-Filharmonien, Bergen Filharmoniske Orkester, Kringkastingsorkestret, Lautten Compagney (Berlin) Forsvarets Musikkorps, TrondheimSolistene, Barratt Dues Chamber Orchestra, Ensemble Allegria, Det Norske Kammerorkester, Vertavokvartetten, Cikada Strykekvartett, Den Danske strykekvartett, Engegårdkvartetten, Grieg Trio, Oslo Trio, Hot Club de Norvège, Mathias Eick Trio, Tord Gustavsen Trio, The Brazz Brothers, Trio Mediæval, Nordic Voices, Music for a While, Solveig Kringlebotn, Håkan Hagegård, Johannes Weisser, Ann-Helen Moen, Vilde Frang, Jan Garbarek, Knut Buen, Knut Hamre, Benedicte Maurseth, Åse Teigland, Unni Løvlid, Leif Ove Andsnes, Truls Mørk, Henning Kraggerud, Jean-Yves Thibaudet, Christian Ihle Hadland, Simon Trpčeski, Håvard Gimse, Sveinung Bjelland, Ole Edvard Antonsen, Tine Thing Helseth, Svein Tindberg, Helge Jordal, Åse Kleveland, Gunilla Süssmann and Wolfgang Plagge.

== History ==
The music festival was initiated by concertmaster Stig Nilsson of the Oslo Philharmonic Orchestra.

=== Artistic leaders ===
- Stig Nilsson 1996–2012
- Anders Kjellberg Nilsson and Wolfgang Plagge 2012–2014.
- Therese Birkelund Ulvo and Tora Augestad 2015–present.

=== Managing directors ===
- Per Erik Kise Larsen 1996–2001
- Alf Magnus Reistad 2001–2005
- Tone Tveito Eidnes 2005–2012
- Alf Magnus Reistad 2012-
