= List of Simax albums =

Simax catalog with records published by the label Simax Classics.

Albums

- 1983: Kjell Samkopf, Music For Solo Percussion And Electronics (PN 2009)
- 1986: Stein-Erik Olsen, Guitar (PS 1008)
- 1980: Edvard Grieg, Poems By Vilhelm Krag, Op. 60 / Haugtussa, Op. 67 (PS 1011)
- 1985: Kalenda Maya, Songs And Dances From 1200 To 1550 Spain, Italy, France And Germany (PS 1017)
- 1987: Truls Otterbech Mørk, Arne Nordheim, George Crumb, Ingvar Lidholm, Zoltán Kodály, Untitled (PSC 1023)
- 1987: Arild Sandvold & Kåre Nordstoga, Organ Music (PSC 1028)
- 1988: Various artists, The Crown Princess Sonja International Music Competition - Vol 1: Music By Grieg And Norwegian Contemporary Composers (PSC 1042)
- 1989: Dorothy Dorow & Aage Kvalbein, Contemporary Music For Soprano And Cello (PSC 1052)
- 1993: Marin Marais, Laurence Dreyfus, Ketil Haugsand, Les Folies D'Espagne & Tombeau For Lully And For Ste. Colombe And Other Works From Pièces De Violes (1701) (PSC 1053)
- 1991: Harald Sæverud & Jan Henrik Kayser, 23 Selected Piano Pieces (PSC 1070)
- 1994: Gro Sandvik & Stein-Erik Olsen, Diptych (PSC 1083)
- 1991: Stein-Erik Olsen, Songs & Dances (PSC 1084)
- 1993: Harald Sæverud, Sønderjylland Symphony Orchestra, Karsten Andersen, Trond Sæverud, Complete Works For Violin (PSC 1087)
- 1993: Malcolm Arnold, Jacques Ibert, August Klughardt, Anton Reicha, Harald Sæverud, Bergen Wind Quintet, Three Shanties Op. 4 / Trois Pièces Brèves / Wind Quintet Op. 79 / Wind Quintet Op. 88 No. 2 / Wind Quintet No. 2 (PSC 1094)
- 1993: Øystein Baadsvik, Tuba (PSC 1101)
- 1998: Halvor Haug, Norrköping Symphony Orchestra, English Chamber Orchestra, Ole Kristian Ruud, Symphony No. 3 The Inscrutable Life ・Insignia・Silence・Song Of The Pines (PSC 1113)
- 1995: Knut Nystedt, Oslo String Quartet, String Quartets (PSC 1114)
- 1995: Alfred Schnittke, Karol Szymanowski, Ketil Hvoslef, Krzysztof Penderecki, Einar Henning Smebye, Lars Erik ter Jung, Quasi una Sonata (PSC 1115)
- 1995: Geirr Tveitt, Geir Botnen, Piano Works (PSC 1121)
- 1995: Carl Nielsen, Vertavo String Quartet, Piano Works (PSC 1131)
- 1996: Geirr Tveitt, Geir Botnen, Reidun Horvei, Fifty Folk Tunes From Hardanger (PSC 1132)
- 1997: J.S. Bach, Mozart, Phantasm, Art Of Fugue (PSC 1135)
- 1997: Harald Sæverud, Hansa Quartet, String Quartets (PSC 1141)
- 2001: Bridge - Britten / Øystein Birkeland, Vebjørn Anvik, Bridge & Britten (PSC 1160)
- 2000: Various artists, 21 Marches For The 21st Century (PSC 1163)
- 2002: Ludvig Irgens-Jensen, Ragnhild Heiland Sørensen, Bergen Philharmonic Orchestra, Eivind Aadland, Japanischer Frühling (PSC 1164)
- 2002: Grieg Trio, Beethoven • Kaipainen, Beethoven + Kaipainen (PSC 1165)
- 2003: Fartein Valen, Siri Torjesen, Håkon Austbø, Bergen Philharmonic Orchestra, Christian Eggen, Complete Songs (PSC 1168)
- 2006: Arne Nordheim, Draumkvedet - The Dream Ballad (PSC 1169)
- 2004: Paul Dukas, Tor Espen Aspaas, Complete Works For Piano Solo (PSC 1177)
- 2004: Vertavo String Quartet, Les Vendredis (PSC 1178)
- 2002: J.S. Bach, Ketil Haugsand, Goldberg Variations BWV 988 (PSC 1192)
- 2001: Bartók / Vertavo String Quartet, String Quartets 1-6 (PSC 1197)
- 1999: Johan Halvorsen, Latvian National Symphony Orchestra, Terje Mikkelsen, Stage Music 2 (PSC 1199)
- 2000: Saxofon Concentus, Second Tale (PSC 1200)
- 2001: Trond Sæverud - Einar Røttingen, Hika (PSC 1216)
- 2002: Johan Henrik Freithoff, Ketil Haugsand, The Chamber Works Of Johan Henrik Freithoff (PSC 1220)
- 2011: Geirr Tveitt, Fragaria Vesca, From A Travel Diary (PSC 1222)
- 2004: Nordic Baroque Quartet, Northern Delights (PSC 1224)
- 2003: Bjarne Brustad, Sølve Sigerland, Lars Anders Tomter, Music For Violin (PSC 1229)
- 2009: Ann-Helen Moen, Gunilla Süssmann, Catharinus Elling: Haugtussa and German Lieder (PSC 1236)
- 2003: Dan Styffe, Revisited (PSC 1252)
- 2004: Eirik Raude, I Ching (PSC 1255)
- 2003: Gustav Mahler, Mariss Jansons, Oslo Philharmonic Orchestra, Symphonies No. 1 & 9 (PSC 1270)
- 2008: Dan Styffe, Bass Trip (PSC 1288)
- 2007: Tine Thing Helseth, Norwegian Chamber Orchestra, Haydn, Albinoni, Neruda, Hummel, Trumpet Concertos (PSC 1292)
- 2011: Sølve Sigerland, Ruders, Salonen, Hallgrimsson, Written In Sand (PSC 1301)
- 2010: Catharinus Elling, The Engegård Quartet, Nils Anders Mortensen, Quartets (PSC 1304)
- 2010: Hjalmar Borgström, Jonas Båtstrand, Nils Anders Mortensen, The Symphony Orchestra Of Norrlandsoperan, Terje Boye Hansen, Jesus In Gethsemane / Die Nacht Der Toten / Concerto For Violin And Orchestra (PSC 1311)
- 2010: Arve Tellefsen, Ole Bull, Arve Tellefsen Plays Ole Bull (PSC 1312)
- 2011: Arne Nordheim, Oslo Philharmonic Orchestra, Marius Hesby, Jukka-Pekka Saraste, Rolf Gupta, Epitaffio (Monolith / Epitaffio / Canzona / Fonos / Adieu) (PSC1318)
- 1994: Geirr Tveitt, Geirr Tveitt Plays Geirr Tveitt (PSC 1805)
- 1994: Ørnulf Gulbransen, Carl Gustav Sparre Olsen & Johann Kvandal: Norwegian Music For Flute (PSC 1806)
- 1993: Edvard Grieg, The Vocal Music In Historic Interpretations (PSC 1810), Compilation
- 1992: Fartein Valen, Dorothy Dorow, Oslo Philharmonic Orchestra, Miltiades Caridis, Symphonic Poems & Orchestral Songs (PSC 3115)
- 1993: Edvard Fliflet Bræin, Orchestral Works (PSC 3117)
- 1995: Fartein Valen, Violin Concerto Op. 37 • Piano Concerto Op. 44 • Epithalamion Op. 19 • An Die Hoffnung Op. 18 No. 2 • Piano Trio Op. 5 • Serenade For Wind Instrument Op. 13 (PSC 3116), Compilation
- 2000: Fartein Valen, The Eternal (RCD 2013), Compilation

Single

- 2000: Øivind Elgenes / Grete Helle Rasmussen / Helge Havsgård Sunde, Remembrance (PSCDS 1001)
