= Henning Kraggerud =

Norwegian violinist (born 1973)

- Born: 23 June 1973 (age 52); Oslo, Norway
- Occupations: Classical violinist; violist; composer
- Known for: playing a 1744 Guarneri del Gesù violin

Henning Kraggerud (born 23 June 1973) is a Norwegian musician playing violin and viola, and composer.

== Career ==
Kraggerud was born in Oslo. He studied with Camilla Wicks, Emanuel Hurwitz, and Stephan Barratt-Due, before embarking on a career that has brought solo appearances thought Europe, Russia and United States. He made his American debut as a recitalist in 1998 at Carnegie Hall, and has collaborated in recitals and chamber-music performances. A leader-soloist of chamber orchestras and sinfoniettas, Kraggerud is skilled at improvisation, and is an experienced composer, having written music arrangements and his own cadenzas.

His recordings for Naxos include Grieg's Violin Sonatas and Norwegian Favorites for violin and orchestra. A recipient of Norway's prestigious Grieg Prize, Kraggerud was appointed the Bergen International Festival Artist-Residence in 2004. In 2011, Kraggerud took over from Leif Ove Andsnes as co-Artistic Director of the Risør Festival of Chamber Music. From 2012, Kraggerud became Artistic Director of the Tromsø Chamber Orchestra.

Kraggerud performs both on violin and viola at the major international festivals, recent collaborations have included a Szymanowski Focus at Wigmore Hall in London and Zankel Hall in New York City, curated by Piotr Anderszewski, and performances at the Verbier Festival with Joshua Bell, Leonidas Kavakos and Martha Argerich. In 2011 he appeared at the Hong Kong International Chamber Music Festival and the Seoul Spring Festival. He joined colleagues at the Rio International Chamber Music Week in Brazil and the Stavanger International Chamber Music Festival in 2012. Along with Imogen Cooper and Adrian Brendel he appears at LSO St Luke’s in the BBC’s chamber concert series.

Henning Kraggerud plays on a 1744 Guarneri del Gesù.

== Honors ==
- 2007: «Ole Bull Award», for his work on the music of Ole Bull
- 2008: Spellemannprisen in the class Classical music, for the album Eugène Ysaÿe: Six Sonatas For Solo Violin
- 2011: Gammlengprisen in the class Art music

== Discography (in selection) ==
=== Solo albums ===
- 2008: Eugène Ysaÿe: Six Sonatas For Solo Violin (Simax Classics)

=== As soloist ===
- 1997: Grieg: Fiolinsonater Nr. 1-3 (Naxos Music), with Helge Kjekshus (piano)
- 1999: Bull, Halvorsen, Grieg, Sinding, Svendsen: Norwegian Violin Favourites (Naxos Music), with «Razumovsky Symphony Orchestra», conductor: Bjarte Engeset
- 2003: Johan Svendsen: String Quartet • String Quintet (cpo), with Oslo String Quartet
- 2004: Sibelius, Sinding: Violin Concertos (Naxos Music), with Oslo String Quartet
- 2008: Sinding: Musikk For Fiolin Og Klavér (Naxos Music), with Christian Ihle Hadland
- 2009: Christian Sinding: Music For Violin And Piano • 1 (Suite Im Alten Stil, Op. 10 • Waltzes, Op. 59) (Naxos Music), with Christian Ihle Hadland
- 2009: Christian Sinding: Music For Violin And Piano • 2 (Naxos Music), with Christian Ihle Hadland
- 2011: Mozart: Divertimento In E Flat Major (Naxos Music), with Lars Anders Tomter (viola) & Christoph Richter (cello)
- 2012: Nordic Violin Favourites (Naxos Music), with «Dalasinfoniettan», conductor: Bjarte Engeset
- 2016: Mozart: Violin Concertos Nos. 3, 4 and 5 (Naxos Music), with Norwegian Chamber Orchestra

=== Collaborative works ===
- 2012: Last Spring (ATC), with Bugge Wesseltoft
