= Sinfonia Concertante for Violin, Viola and Orchestra (Mozart) =

- by W. A. Mozart
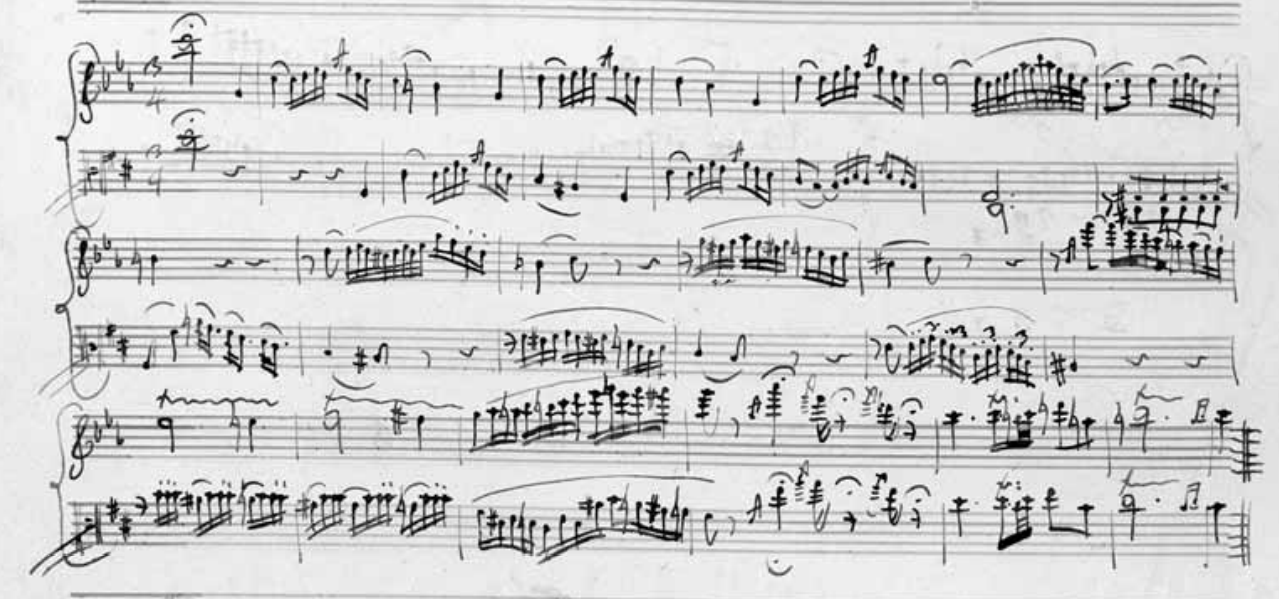
- Autograph of the cadenza to the second movement (from the collection of Veste Coburg)
- Key: E♭ major
- Catalogue: K. 364/320d
- Composed: 1779
- Duration: c. 32 minutes
- Movements: 3
- Scoring: Solo violin, solo viola, orchestra

The Sinfonia Concertante for Violin, Viola and Orchestra in E♭ major, K. 364 (320d), was composed by Wolfgang Amadeus Mozart in 1779.

At the time of its composition, Mozart was living in Salzburg in the aftermath of a disastrous tour of Europe that included Mannheim and Paris. It was not his first composition for two or more string soloists – he had been experimenting with the sinfonia concertante genre in the Concertone in C for two violins, K. 190, written five years earlier, and he was also working on a Sinfonia concertante in A major for violin, viola and cello, K. 320e, which was left in fragmentary form. Simon P Keefe describes this work as 'a concerto in all but name'.

A typical performance lasts roughly 32 minutes.

== Instrumentation ==
The piece is scored in three movements for solo violin, solo viola, two oboes, two natural horns, and strings, the last including a divided viola section, which accounts for the work's rich harmony.

The solo viola part is written in D major instead of E♭ major, (Note: The solo viola in scordatura is treated as a transposing instrument (in D major); in (concert pitch) the part is in E♭ major, the key of the work; writing the part in D major allows the solo violist to use simpler fingerings without being confused by the instrument being tuned a half-step up. This also brightened the viola's sound due to extra tension on the instrument and allowed it to project better over the orchestra.) and the instrument is tuned a semitone sharper (scordatura technique), to give a more brilliant tone due to added tension on the instrument. This technique is less common when performed on the modern viola with steel strings. It is used mostly in historically-informed performance on original instruments, the gut strings becoming brighter in tone with slightly increased tension.

== Structure ==
I. Allegro maestoso

II. Andante

III. Presto

The sinfonia concertante consists of three movements:

1. Allegro maestoso, 4/4
2. Andante, 3/4, in C minor
3. Presto, 2/4

== Recordings ==
Richard Wigmore in Gramophone (October 2015) writes that there are over 40 CD recordings in all. He rates as best to date one by Iona Brown, violinist and conductor, and Lars Anders Tomter, viola, with the Norwegian Chamber Orchestra, Chandos CHAN9695. Also on his short list is a 1989 recording, with Iona Brown, and with Nobuko Imai, viola. Mention should also be made of the 1951 Casals Perpignan Festival recording with Isaac Stern and William Primrose, Casals conducting.

== Legacy ==
This Sinfonia Concertante has influenced many arrangers to use its themes. In 1808 an uncredited arrangement of the piece for a string sextet was published by Sigmund Anton Steiner under the title Grande Sestetto Concertante. All six parts are divided equally among the six players; it is not presented as soloists with accompaniment. It has also been arranged for cello in place of the viola part.

The Sinfonia Concertante was mentioned in William Styron's 1979 novel Sophie's Choice; after a stranger molests Sophie on the subway, she hears the Sinfonia Concertante on the radio, which brings back memories of her childhood in Kraków and snaps her out of her depression. Variations on the slow second movement were used for the soundtrack to the 1988 Peter Greenaway film Drowning by Numbers by composer Michael Nyman. The original piece is also heard after each of the drownings in the screenplay.

A choreographic realization by George Balanchine, danced by students from the School of American Ballet, was premiered at Carnegie Hall in 1945. The professional premiere was by Ballet Society at New York City Center. The ballet isn't in the current repertoire of the New York City Ballet and has most recently been performed in New York City by American Ballet Theatre.
