= Håvard Gimse =

Norwegian pianist (born 1966)

- Born: 15 September 1966 (age 59); Kongsvinger, Hedmark, Norway
- Genres: Classical
- Occupation: Pianist
- Instrument: Piano
- Labels: Naxos, Simax, Virgin Records

Håvard Gimse (born 15 September 1966) is a Norwegian classical pianist from Kongsvinger, and the brother of the cellist Øyvind Gimse. He has received the Griegprisen (1996) and the Steinway Award (1995). Gimse has done several recordings for Naim Audio, Naxos Records, Sony Classical Records, Chandos Records and Simax.

== Career ==
Gimse is described as one of Norway's leading musicians, with a bold and expansive repertoire, and an impressive list of 30 performed piano concertos. He is much sought after as a concert pianist, as well as an accompanist for many of Scandinavia's finest artists.

After earning his diploma at the Hochschule der Künste Berlin in 1995 (Leygraf), he continued his studies with the revered piano professor Jiri Hlinka in Norway.

He is the recipient of 1st Prize in the Jugend Musiziert Competition from 1987, and since then has been awarded many of Norway and Scandinavia's most prestigious awards, including the Steinway Award in 1995, the Grieg Award (1996), the Gammleng Award (2001), and the Sibelius Award in 2004. Gimse won the Norwegian Music Critics Award for his performances of all of Beethoven's Cello Sonatas with Truls Mørk at the Bergen International Festival in 2011.

== Honors ==
Year	Country	Award
1985	Norway	Princess Astrid Music Award
1987	Germany	1st prize in the European Piano Competition Jugend Musiziert
1995	Germany	Steinway Award
1996	Norway	Griegprisen
2001	Norway	Gammleng-prisen
2004	Norway	Sibeliusprisen

== Discography ==
- 1986: Musikk i Asker – F. Liszt: Sonata, F.Chopin: Ballade& Fantasy (Asker Kulturkontor MA1001)
- 1992: Music in a Nordic summer Night (Victoria VCD19052), with Stig Nilsson (violin)
- 1992: Sanger av Edvard Grieg (Norsk plateproduksjon IDCD29), with Elizabeth Norberg-Schulz (soprano)
- 1994: Grieg: Cello Sonata Op.36, Piano sonata Op. 7, Intermezzo (Naxos 8550878), with Øystein Birkeland (cello)
- 1997: Vieuxtemps/Franck: Music for Viola (Simax PSC1126), with Lars Anders Tomter (viola)
- 1998: Mozart: Sinfonia Concertante, K364/Piano Concerto, K365 (Chandos CHAN9695), with Iona Brown (violin), Lars Anders Tomter (viola), Vebjørn Anvik (klaver) & Det Norske Kammerorkester
- 1998: Geirr Tveitt: Piano Music vol. 2 (Marco Polo 8225056)
- 1998: Geirr Tveitt: Piano Music vol. 1 (Marco Polo 8225055)
- 1998: Franske mirakler (Kirkelig Kulturverksted FXCD201), with Aage Kvalbein (cello)
- 1999: Sibelius: Piano Music Vol. 1 (Naxos 8553899)
- 1999: Italienske mirakler (Kirkelig Kulturverksted FXCD216), with Aage Kvalbein (cello), Elizabeth Norberg-Schulz (soprano), Rolf Lislevand (lute instruments) & Henning Sommerro (accordion)
- 2000: Grieg: Samlede fiolinsonater (Sony Classical SK 89085), with Arve Tellefsen (violin)
- 2000: Mozart, Faurè, Prokofiev, Lutoslawski (Simax PSC1210), with Marianne Thorsen (violin)
- 2000: Martinu, Kabalevsky: Sonatas & Variations for Cello and Piano (Simax PSC1146), with Øystein Birkeland (cello)
- 2000: Chopin: Scherzi and Preludes (Naim NAIMCD028)
- 2000: Sibelius: Piano Music Vol. 2 (Naxos 8554808)
- 2001: Geirr Tveitt: Piano Concertos Nos 1 & 5 (Naxos 8555077), with the Royal Scottish National Orchestra/Bjarte Engeset
- 2001: Sibelius: Piano Music Vol. 3 (Naxos 8554814)
- 2001: Spanske mirakler (Kirkelig Kulturverksted FXCD241), with Aage Kvalbein (cello), Rolf Lislevand (guitar & theorbe) & Henning Sommerro (organ)
- 2001: Hindemith: The Four Temperaments (Intim Musik IMCD 068), with Kristiansand Kammerorkester / Jan Stigmer
- 2001: Carl Nielsen: Works for solo Violin and Violin and Piano (Afontibus ATB-CD 3), with Geir Inge Lotsberg (violin)
- 2002: Grieg: Cello Sonata Op.36, String Quartet Op.27 (Virgin Classics 5455052), with Truls Mørk (cello), Sølve Sigerland (violin 1), Atle Sponberg (violin 2) & Lars Anders Tomter (viola)
- 2002: Geirr Tveitt: Pianoconcerto 4 & Variations for two pianos and orchestra (Naxos 8555761), with Gunilla Süssmann (klaver) Royal Scottish National Orchestra/Bjarte Engeset
- 2002: Grieg: Folk Songs, Dances (Naim NAIMCD059)
- 2003: Sibelius: Piano Music Vol. 4 (Naxos 8555363)
- 2003: T. Tellefsen – F. Chopin (Sonor Records SONCD9004), with Øyvind Gimse (cello)
- 2004: Sibelius: Piano Music Vol. 5 (Piano Miniatures) (Naxos 8555853)
- 2004: D. Shostakovitch: Music for Viola and piano (Somm SOMMCD030), with Lars Anders Tomter (viola)
- 2004: Grieg: Piano Concerto a minor (Naxos 8557279), with the Royal Scottish National Orchestra/Bjarte Engeset
- 2004: Sibelius: Songs (Simax PSC1240), with Randi Stene (mezzosopran)
- 2005: Ole Bull – a Norwegian Pioneer (Simax PSC1261), with Arve Tellefsen (violin) & Trondheim Symphony Orchestra/Eivind Aadland
- 2006: Piano Works by Haydn, Mozart, Beethoven (Naim NAIMCD089)
- 2006: Elk Sonata (Nordic Sounds NOSCD1967), with Lars Anders Tomter (viola)
- 2007: Klaus Egge – Piano Concerto No. 2 (Naxos 8557834), with Trondheim Soloists & Øyvind Gimse
- 2008: David Monrad Johansen, Johan Kvandal – Piano Concertos, Pan (Simax PSC1234), with Oslo Philharmonic Orchestra, Christian Eggen & Ole Kristian Ruud
- 2008: Béla Bártok: Works for Violin (Simax PSC1174), with Elise Båtnes (violin)
- 2013: Arvesylv. Works by Tveitt, Sæverud and Mørk Karlsen (Fabra FBRCD-10)
