= Markku Luolajan-Mikkola =

Finnish baroque cellist and viol player

- Born: Helsinki, Finland
- Education: Sibelius Academy, Royal Conservatory of The Hague
- Occupation(s): Baroque cellist, viol player
- Known for: Founding member of Phantasm viol quartet, contributions to baroque music
- Awards: Grammy Awards, Diapason d'Or, BBC Music Magazine Awards, and more

Markku Luolajan-Mikkola is a Finnish baroque cellist and viol player. Born in Helsinki, he studied cello with Arto Noras at the Sibelius Academy, where he received his diploma in 1983. Later, an interest in baroque music led him to summer courses with Laurence Dreyfus, and afterwards he went on to Royal Conservatory of The Hague where he studied viola da gamba with Wieland Kuijken and baroque cello with Jaap ter Linden, receiving postgraduate diplomas in viola da gamba and baroque cello in 1992.

He is a founding member of the celebrated Phantasm viol quartet the Norwegian baroque ensemble Bergen Barokk and the Finnish Baroque Orchestra (being its artistic leader from 2009 to 2013). His engagements include appearances in Europe, America and Asia. The Finnish Broadcast Company honored him as "Musical act of the year 2003" which was awarded after his "Gambaa!" recitals series of French baroque music, giving more than 50 recitals with different programs. He has performed recitals with all Bach cello suites and is one of the pioneers commissioning contemporary music for the bass and treble viols.

His more than 40 solo and chamber music recordings (stand out his solo parts of Marais, Forqueray and Couperin) are available on the Alba, Avie, BIS, Linn, Simax, Channel Classics, Decca, GMN and Toccata Classics labels.

Gramophone Awards -of the year and editor's choice- (with Phantasm), Emma Award ("Finnish Grammy"), Diapason d'Or, and Chod du Monde de la Musique, BBC Music Magazine, Rondo Magazine, Best Recordings of the Year-Helsingin Sanomat, MusicWeb International, are some of his awards.

He teaches baroque cello and viola da gamba at the Sibelius Academy, and is the artistic director of the largest Scandinavian early music festival BRQ Vantaa Festival in Vantaa (Finland). In 2002 he founded Lu-Mi Strings Ltd, a company which produces fine hand made contemporary baroque instruments in Beijing.
