= Symphony No. 1 (Svendsen) =

Symphony written in 1867 by Johan Svendsen

- by Johan Svendsen
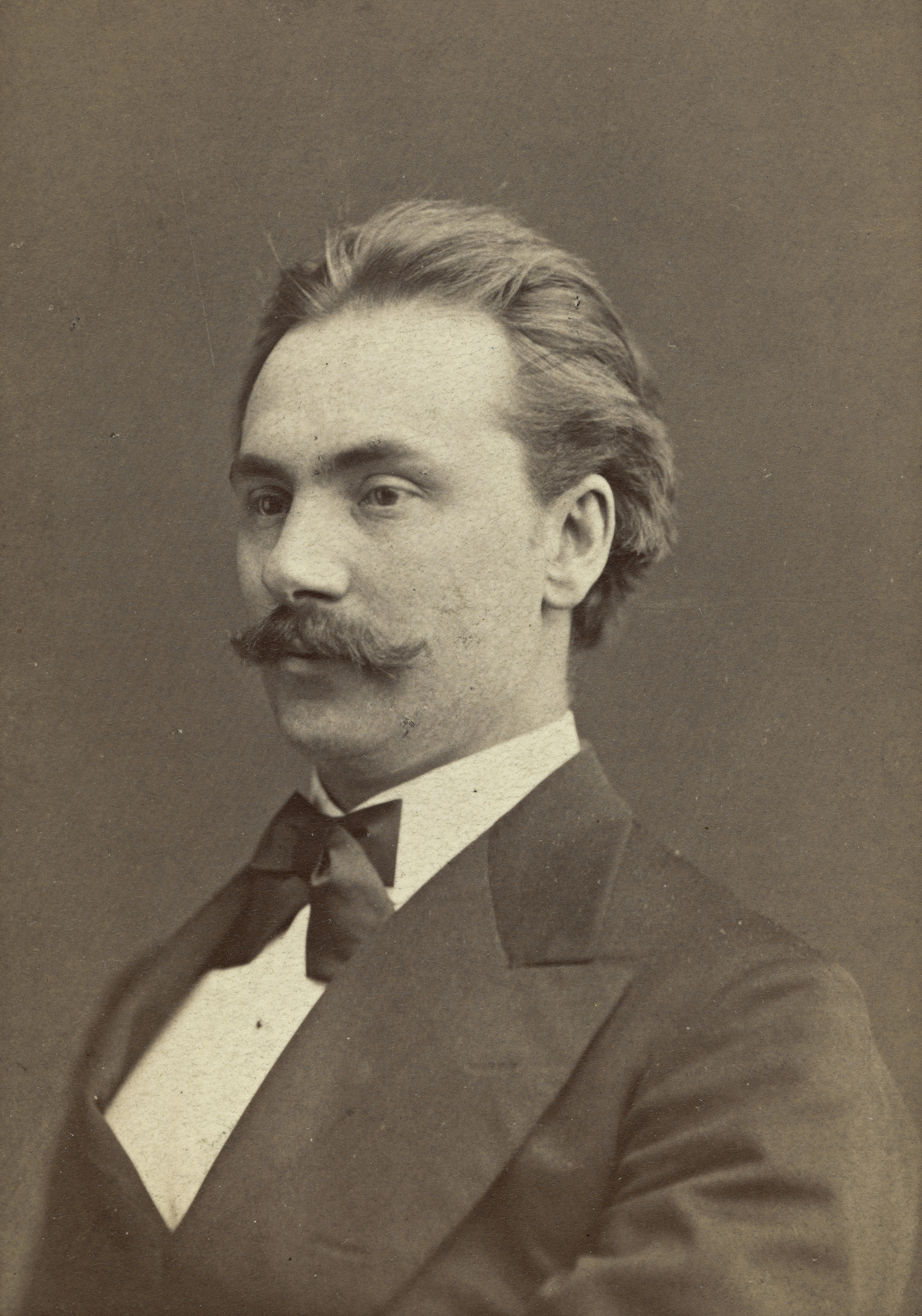
- The composer (c. 1870)
- Key: D major
- Catalogue: JSV 38
- Opus: 4
- Composed: 1865–1867
- Publisher: Fritzsch (1868)
- Duration: 35 mins.
- Movements: 4

Premiere
- Date: 12 October 1867
- Location: Kristiania, Norway
- Conductor: Johan Svendsen

The Symphony No. 1 in D major, Op. 4 (JSV 38), is a four-movement orchestral work written from 1866 to 1867 by the Norwegian composer Johan Svendsen while he was a music student at the Leipzig Conservatory. The first movement premiered in Leipzig on 9 May 1866 at the Altes Gewandhaus, with Svendsen conducting; a year later in the same location, he conducted Movements II–IV for the first time. These earlier partial performances notwithstanding, the symphony—in its entirety—received its premiere in Kristiania (now Oslo), Norway, on 12 October 1967, again under the composer's baton.

The First Symphony was an instant success that placed Svendsen at the forefront of Norwegian art music and squarely within the European symphonic tradition. The composer's friend and countryman, Edvard Grieg, was so moved by the symphony that he withdrew his own work in the genre, the Symphony in C minor (EG 119; 1864); Grieg, in a review, praised "the perfect balance between ideas and technique", and called the orchestration among "the best in existence" ... "God alone knows where Svendsen got it all from".

In 1874, Svendsen completed his next (and final) work in the genre: the Symphony No. 2, Op. 15.

== Structure ==
The Symphony No. 1 is in four movements:

1. Molto allegro
2. Andante
3. Allegretto scherzando
4. Finale. Maestoso – Allegro assai con fuoco

== Instrumentation ==
The First Symphony is scored for the following instruments, organized by family (woodwinds, brass, percussion, and strings):

- 2 flutes, 2 oboes, 2 clarinets (in A), and 2 bassoons
- 4 horns (in E♭), 2 trumpets (in E♭), 1 alto trombone, 1 trombone, and 1 bass trombone
- timpani
- violins (I and II), violas, cellos, and double basses

== Discography ==
The sortable table below lists commercially available recordings of Svendsen's First Symphony:

No.	Conductor	Orchestra	Rec. (Note: Refers to the year in which the performers recorded the work; this may not be the same as the year in which the recording was first released to the general public.)	Time	Recording venue	Label	Ref.
1	Odd Grüner-Hegge	Oslo Philharmonic Orchestra (1)	c. 1961	?	?	Philips	(Note: O. Grüner-Hegge—Philips (A 631 097 L) 1961)
2	Miltiades Caridis	Oslo Philharmonic Orchestra (2)	c. 1974	33:26	?	Norsk Kulturråds Klassikerserie	(Note: M. Caridis—Norsk Kulturråds Klassikerserie (NKF 30 001) 1974)
3	Neeme Järvi (1)	Gothenburg Symphony Orchestra	1986	34:48	Gothenburg Concert Hall	BIS	(Note: N. Järvi—BIS (CD–347) 1987)
4	Mariss Jansons	Oslo Philharmonic Orchestra (3)	1987	34:55	Oslo Concert Hall	EMI Classics	(Note: M. Jansons—EMI Classics (7243 5 85070 2 7) 2003)
5	Ari Rasilainen	Norwegian Radio Orchestra	1996	36:42	NRK Broadcasting Hall, Oslo	Finlandia	(Note: A. Rasilainen—Finlandia (0630–19055–2) 1998)
6	Terje Mikkelsen	Latvian National Symphony Orchestra	1997	35:33	Rīgas Reformātu baznīca	cpo	(Note: T. Mikkelsen—cpo (777 372 2) 2008)
7	Bjarte Engeset	Bournemouth Symphony Orchestra	1997	36:02	Wessex Hall, Poole Arts Centre	Naxos	(Note: B. Engeset—Naxos (8.553898) 1998)
8	Thomas Dausgaard	Danish National Radio Symphony Orchestra	2000	35:26	Danish Radio Concert Hall, Copenhagen	Chandos	(Note: T. Dausgaard—Chandos (CHAN 9932) 2001)
9	Neeme Järvi (2)	Bergen Philharmonic Orchestra	2012	33:28	Grieg Hall	Chandos	(Note: N. Järvi—Chandos (CHAN 10766) 2013)

== Notes, references, and sources ==
Notes

Sources

- Engeset, Bjarte (2022). "Svendsen: Johan: Symphony No. 1 in D major, Op. 4". musikkarven.no. Norsk Musikkarv.
- Christophersen, Morten (2013). Johan Svendsen: Orchestral Works, Vol. 2 (CD booklet). Neeme Järvi & Bergen Philharmonic Orchestra. Chandos. CHAN 10711.
- Haglund, Rolf (1986). John Svendsen: The Two Symphonies / Two Swedish Folk Tunes for Strings (CD booklet). Neeme Järvi & Gothenburg Symphony Orchestra. BIS. CD–347.
- "John Svendsen: Sinfonie (D dur) für Orchester, Op. 4" [John Svendsen: Symphony (D major) for Orchestra, Op. 4]. imslp.org. E.W. Fritzsch. 1868.
