= Wolfgang Plagge =

Norwegian composer and pianist (born 1960)

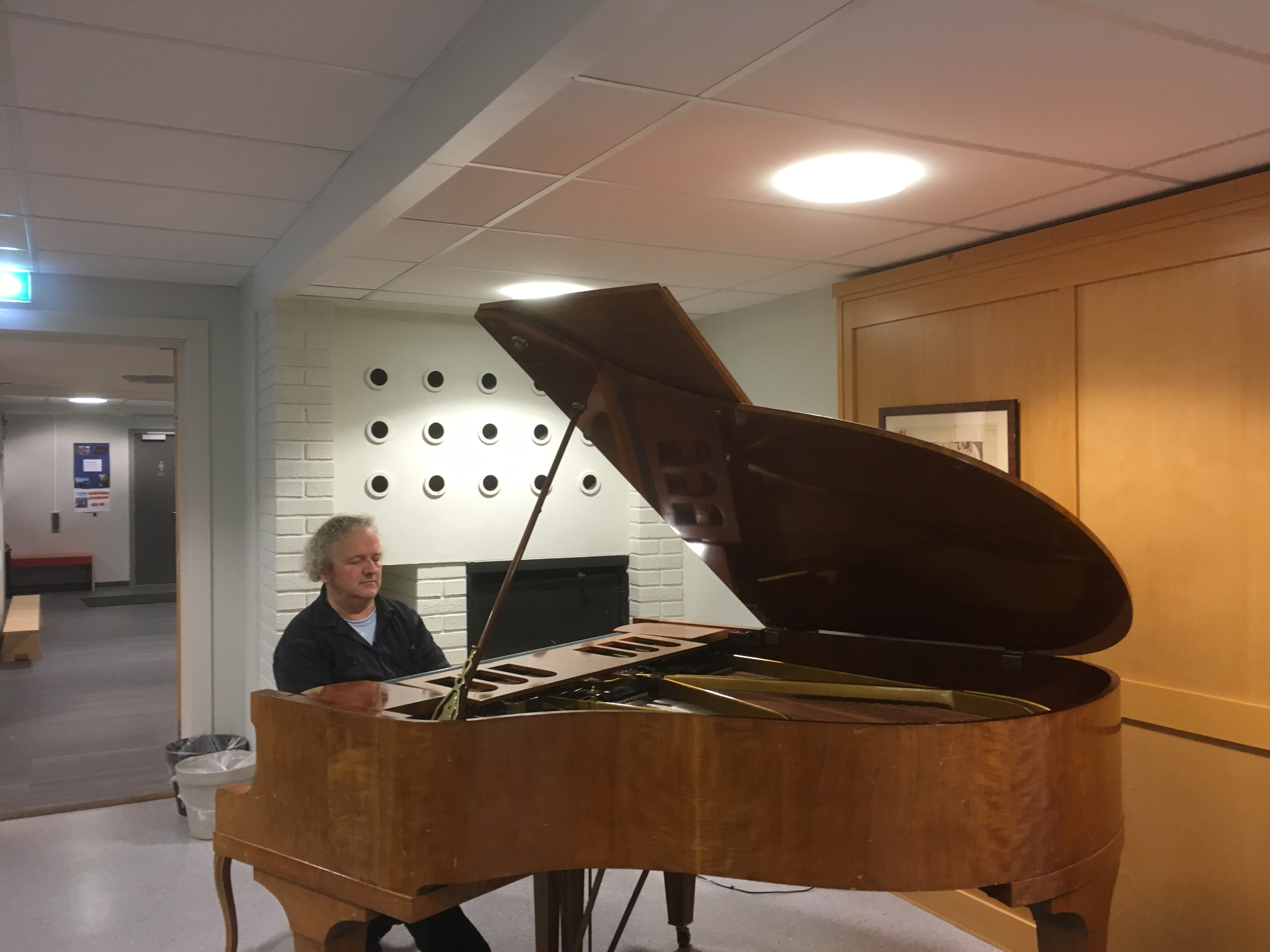
- Plagge in 2016

Background information
- Born: 23 August 1960 (age 65); Oslo, Norway
- Genres: Classical
- Occupations: Pianist, composer
- Instrument: Piano
- Labels: Simax, 2L
- Website: plagge.no

Wolfgang Plagge (born 23 August 1960) is a Norwegian composer and pianist.

== Biography ==
Born 23 August 1960, Plagge started playing the piano as four years old, and made a sensational recital debut in the University Hall in Oslo, only twelve years old. He also started composing at an early age, had his first work published aged twelve, and is particularly renowned for his works for wind instruments. Despite a rheumatic disorder Plagge often performs as pianist and has played with several leading orchestras. He has received several awards for his musical work. He has been performing as a soloist with a large number of orchestras in and outside of Norway, and has worked with internationally renowned artists like Ole Edvard Antonsen, Jens Harald Bratlie, Aleksandr Dmitriyev, Philippe Entremont, Lutz Herbig, Piotr Janowski, Evgeni Koroliov, Solveig Kringlebotn, Truls Mørk, Robert Oppenheimer, Robert Rønnes, Leif Segerstam, Randi Stene, Roberto Szidon, Lars Anders Tomter and Frøydis Ree Wekre.

Plagge has since he was 8 years been organist and eventually Cantor in Asker and Bærum congregation of The Catholic Church in Stabekk, Norway. He has a significant number of musical contribution to the Catholic hymnbook in Norway, "Lov Herren" (Praise the Lord).

In 2007, he was the recipient of the Hungarian The international cultural order of knights of St. Stefan which is Hungary's highest civilian honor for his work on promoting Hungarian music and culture in the Nordic countries, as well as his work with the teaching technique of Zoltán Kodály.

== Honors ==
- 1970: Talent award at British television
- 1971: Youth Piano Championship in Oslo
- 1996: “Composer of the Year” with the Trondheim Symphony Orchestra
- 2001: American ASCAP Award
- 2003: Winner of Vocal Nord composers’ contest
- 2014: Bærum Culture Award

== Works ==
Compositions (in selection)

- 1982/88: Musikk for to klaverer, op. 17
- 1988/89: Horn Sonata I, for horn og klaver "A Litany for the 21st Century", 1988/89
- 1990: Konsert for horn og orkester, op. 49
- 1990/91: : Konsert for fiolin og orkester, op. 55
- 1992/2001: Solarljod for sopran og klaver, op. 68
- 1995/97: Concerto Grosso I for fagott, klaver og orkester, op. 85
- 1996/2001: Concerto Grosso II for to klaverer, messingkvintett og pauke, op. 87
- 1999/2000: Liknarbraut (Nådens veg), kantate for blandet kor, op. 102
- 1999/2000: Sonate for trompet og klaver, op. 103
- 2000: Blücher, trio for fløyte, fagott og klaver, op. 104
- 2001: Reflections, 6 stykker for klaver, inspirert av Beethovens Bagateller op. 126, op. 113
- 2001: Liber Squentiarum Nidrosiensis, Sekvens fra Nidaros erkebispesete for sang og trompet, op. 114
- 2001: Violin Sonata IV, for fiolin og klaver, op. 116

== Discography (in selection) ==
DISCOGRAPHY (COMPOSER)

- MUSIC FOR TWO PIANOS op 17 (Koroliov Piano duo) 2L CD6
- ELEVAZIONE op 21 (Boye Hansen / Bratlie) BD 7035C
- ASTEROIDE SUITE op 33 (Follesø / Kjekshus) 2L CD14
- SONATA I op 39 horn & piano (Bonet / Banados) Verso VRS 2003
- SONATA I op 43 bassoon & piano (Rønnes / Knardahl) SIMAX PSC1077
- FESTIVAL MUSIC op 46 no 3 (HMKG symph. Band / Andresen) SONET SCD 15022
- CONCERTO op 49 horn & orchestra (Wekre / TSO) SIMAX PSC1100
- MONOCEROS op 51 (Wekre) 2L CD25
- CANZONA op 53 (Arctic Brass / Plagge) SIMAX PSC1074
- MUSIC FOR CELLO op 54 (Kvalbein) Aurora ACD 5040
- SONATA op 64 euphonium & piano (Olsrud / Hennig) SSO01
- FACSIMILES op 66 (Faukstad) BD 7028C
- SONATA II op 67 horn & piano (Wekre / Plagge) 2L CD25
- SÓLARLJÓÐ op 68 (Kringlebotn / Plagge) 2L CD5
- CONCERTO GROSSO II op 85 (Koroliov Piano duo / Stensø / Arctic Brass) 2L CD6
- SONATA III op 88 horn & piano (Wekre / Plagge) 2L CD25
- RHAPSODY op 89 (Follesø) 2L CD14
