= Symphony No. 2 (Svendsen) =

Symphony written in 1874 by Johan Svendsen

- by Johan Svendsen
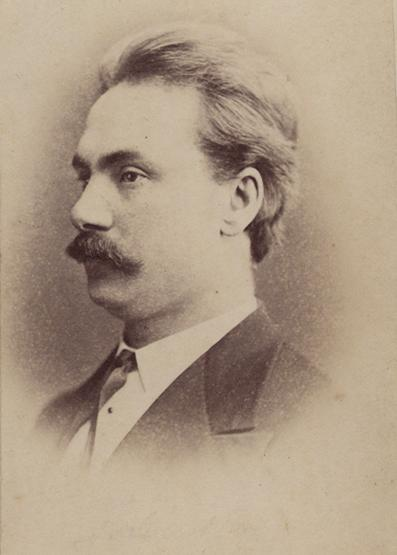
- The composer (c. 1870s)
- Key: B♭ major
- Catalogue: JSV 66
- Opus: 15
- Composed: 1874
- Publisher: Fritzsch (1877)
- Duration: 33 mins.
- Movements: 4

Premiere
- Date: 14 October 1976
- Location: Kristiania, Norway
- Conductor: Johan Svendsen

The Symphony No. 2 in B♭ major, Op. 15 (JSV 66), is a four-movement orchestral work written in 1874 by the Norwegian composer Johan Svendsen. The symphony was premiered in Kristiania (now Oslo), Norway, on 14 October 1876. The music was well received, and the third movement repeated for an enthusiastic audience.

The symphony has been characterized by Svendsen's biographers – Finn Benestaf and Dag Schjelderup-Ebbe – as Svendsen's "most mature and distinguished work".

The Second Symphony's predecessor in the genre is the Symphony No. 1 in D major, Op. 4, which Svendsen had completed seven years earlier, in 1867.

== Structure ==
The Symphony No. 2 is in four movements:

1. Allegro
2. Andante sostenuto
3. Intermezzo. Allegro giusto
4. Finale. Andante – Allegro con fuoco

== Instrumentation ==
The Second Symphony is scored for the following instruments, organized by family (woodwinds, brass, percussion, and strings):

- 2 flutes, 2 oboes, 2 clarinets (in B♭), and 2 bassoons
- 4 horns (in F), 2 trumpets (in F), 2 trombones, and 1 bass trombone
- timpani
- violins (I and II), violas, cellos, and double basses

The score was published by the Leipzig-based firm of E. W. Fritzsch in 1877.

== Discography ==
The sortable table below lists commercially available recordings of Svendson's Second Symphony:

No.	Conductor	Orchestra	Rec. (Note: Refers to the year in which the performers recorded the work; this may not be the same as the year in which the recording was first released to the general public.)	Time	Recording venue	Label	Ref.
1	Øivin Fjeldstad	Oslo Philharmonic Orchestra (1)	c. 1975	31:27	?	Norsk Kulturråds Klassikerserie	(Note: Ø. Fjeldstad—Norsk Kulturråds Klassikerserie (NKF 30 009) 1975)
2	Neeme Järvi (1)	Gothenburg Symphony Orchestra	1986	30:08	Gothenburg Concert Hall	BIS	(Note: N. Järvi—BIS (CD–347) 1987)
3	Mariss Jansons	Oslo Philharmonic Orchestra (2)	1987	32:25	Oslo Concert Hall	EMI Classics	(Note: M. Jansons—EMI Classics (7243 5 85070 2 7) 2003)
4	Grant Llewellyn	Stavanger Symphony Orchestra	1993	32:12	[Unknown venue], Stavanger	Chatsworth	(Note: G. Llewellyn—Chatsworth (FCM 1002) 1994)
5	Ari Rasilainen	Norwegian Radio Orchestra	1996	34:15	NRK Broadcasting Hall, Oslo	Finlandia	(Note: A. Rasilainen—Finlandia (0630–19055–2) 1998)
6	Terje Mikkelsen	Latvian National Symphony Orchestra	1997	33:03	Rīgas Reformātu baznīca	cpo	(Note: T. Mikkelsen—cpo (777 372 2) 2008)
7	Bjarte Engeset	Bournemouth Symphony Orchestra	1997	34:31	Wessex Hall, Poole Arts Centre	Naxos	(Note: B. Engeset—Naxos (8.553898) 1998)
8	Thomas Dausgaard	Danish National Radio Symphony Orchestra	2000	33:26	Danish Radio Concert Hall, Copenhagen	Chandos	(Note: T. Dausgaard—Chandos (CHAN 9932) 2001)
9	Neeme Järvi (2)	Bergen Philharmonic Orchestra	2012	31:56	Grieg Hall	Chandos	(Note: N. Järvi—Chandos (CHAN 10766) 2013)

== Notes, references, and sources ==
Notes

Sources

- Engeset, Bjarte (2022). "Svendsen: Johan: Symphony No. 2 in B-flat major, Op. 15". musikkarven.no. Norsk Musikkarv.
- Finn Benestaf; Dag Schjelderup-Ebbe (1995). Johan Svendsen: The Man, the Maestro, the Music. Translated by William H. Halverson. Peer Gynt Press. ISBN 9-780-9645238-0-7.
- "John Svendsen: Symphonie (No. 2, B dur) für Orchester, Op. 15" [John Svendsen: Symphony (No, 2, B-flat major) for Orchestra, Op. 154]. imslp.org. E.W. Fritzsch. 1877.
