= Ketil Haugsand =

Norwegian harpsichordist and conductor (born 1947)

- Birth name: Ketil Are Haugsand
- Born: 13 June 1947 (age 78); Oslo, Norway
- Genres: Classical
- Occupation(s): Musician, conductor
- Instrument: Harpsichord
- Labels: Simax Classics, Virgin Veritas

Ketil Are Haugsand (born 13 June 1947) is a Norwegian harpsichordist and conductor. He was born in Oslo.

== Biography ==
Haugsand started his musical studies in Trondheim and Oslo, and later studied in Prague and Haarlem. In 1973, he earned his solo diploma. In 1975, he was awarded the Prix d'Excellence at the Amsterdam conservatory, where he studied under Gustav Leonhardt.

Haugsand has toured in Europe, Israel and the United States. Major recordings include Johann Sebastian Bach's Goldberg Variations and several recordings with the Norwegian Baroque Orchestra. He was professor of music at the Norwegian Academy of Music from 1974 until 1995. Since 1995, he has been a professor at the Hochschule für Musik (Academy of Music) in Cologne, Germany.

== Discography ==
As soloist

- 1981: Louis Marchand: Pièces De Clavecin (Simax Classics)
- 1995: Carlos Seixas: Harpsichord Concerto • Sinfonia • Harpsichord Sonatas (Virgin Veritas)
- 1994: Johann Sebastian Bach: The Six Partitas, BWV 825–830 (Simax Classics)
- 1994: Carlos Seixas: Missa • Dixit Dominus • Tantum Ergo • Organ Sonatas (Virgin Veritas), with the Norwegian Baroque Orchestra, chorus Coro de Câmara de Lisboa
- 2002: J. S. Bach: Goldberg Variations (Simax Classics)

Chamber music

- 1993: Jean-Philippe Rameau: Pièces De Clavecin En Concerts (Simax Classics), with Catherine Mackintosh and Laurence Dreyfus
- 1993: Marin Marais: Les Folies D'Espagne & Tombeau For Lully And For Ste. Colombe And Other Works From Pièces De Violes (1701) (Simax Classics), with Laurence Dreyfus
- 2002: The Chamber Works of Johan Henrik Freithoff (Simax Classics)
- 2011: Jean Baptiste Loeillet de Gant: Recorder Sonatas (Naxos Music), with Daniel Rothert, Vanessa Young
