= Ulvo =

Ulvo is a surname. Notable people with the surname include:

- Andreas Ulvo (born 1983), Norwegian jazz pianist, organist, keyboardist, and composer
- Therese Birkelund Ulvo (born 1982), Norwegian composer and producer
