= Ivète Piveteau =

French harpsichordist, organist and pianist

Ivète Piveteau (Yvète Piveteau) is a French harpsichordist, organist and pianist. She studied with Gustav Leonhardt and was later invited to teach at the Juilliard School in New York.

Piveteau has recorded at least French baroque music (for Adda), Le Chant du Monde and Virgin Veritas) and the complete keyboard sonatas by Wolfgang Amadeus Mozart (Arpeggio ARG 001–005 / ARG 006) as well as duo sonatas for violin and piano by Ludwig van Beethoven (together with Roseline Piveteau; Mfp MFP 6068).
