= Ann-Helen Moen =

- Born: 29 November 1969 (age 55); Molde, Møre og Romsdal
- Origin: Norway
- Genres: Classical
- Occupation: Musician
- Website: Official website

Ann-Helen Moen (born 29 November 1969 in Molde, Norway) is a Norwegian lyric soprano from Molde Municipality in Norway, currently residing in Saffron Walden, United Kingdom.

== Biography ==
A graduate of the Grieg Academy (University of Bergen) and the Opera Academy in Copenhagen, Moen was a soloist at the opera in Graz, Austria, from 2001 to 2004 and has since performed for such companies as Den Nye Opera (Bergen), Hanover State Opera, the Norwegian National Opera, Trieste Opera and Zürich Opera (with the conductor William Christie). She appears regularly in concert, especially at Scandinavian music festivals: highlights include appearing as Solveig in Bentein Baardson's production of Peer Gynt in front of the Sphinx of Giza and her debut at Carnegie Hall with Leif Ove Andsnes in 2005.

Moen was a full-time soloist of Opera Graz, Austria, and her debut album, Catharinus Elling: Haugtussa and German Lieder, was released on SIMAX in 2009, awarded dice 5 by the Norwegian newspaper Bergens Tidende critique. She recited famous arias from operas, operettas and musicals, together with the young Norwegian tenor Erlend Tvinnereim at the Trondheim Chamber Music Festival 2013.

== Honors ==
- Belvedere Competition, Vienna: special prize
- Queen Sonja International Music Competition, 1999: best Norwegian artist
- The Esso Prize, 2000

== Discography ==
=== Solo albums ===
- 2009: Catharinus Elling: Haugtussa and German Lieder (Simax Classics), with, Gunilla Süssmann (piano)

=== Collaborations ===
- 1989: Herdens Flöjt - Julsånger På Pan-flöjt (Kirkelig Kulturverksted), with Roar Engelberg
- 1992: Landskap Av Stemmer (Kirkelig Kulturverksted), with SKRUK

== Operatic roles ==
- Laura Wingfield, The Glass Managerie, Bibalo
- Micaela, Carmen, Bizet
- Anne Pedersdotter, E.Fliflet Bræin
- The Scottish Margarethe, The Maid of Norway, K.Habbestad
- Nina, Rebekka, G.E.Haugland
- Lisaura, Alessandro, Handel
- Almirena,Rinaldo, Handel
- Semele, Handel
- Åse, King and Marshall, Heise
- Julia, Der Vetter uas Dingsda, Künneke
- Poppea, L'incoronazione di Poppea, Monteverdi
- Sandrina, la finta giardiniera, Mozart
- Contessa, Le Nozze di Figaro, Mozart
- Donna Elvira / Zerlina, Don Giovanni, Mozart
- Pamina / Papagena, Die Zaüberflöte, Mozart
- Lauretta, Gianni Schicchi, Puccini
- Belinda, Dido and Æeneas, Purcell
- Echo, Ariadne auf Naxos, Richard Strauss
- Ann Trulove, The Rake's Progress, Stravinsky
- Tatyana, Eugen Onegin, Tchaikovsky
