= Gunilla Süssmann =

- Born: 22 June 1977 (age 49); Bergen, Hordaland
- Origin: Norway
- Education: Norwegian Academy of Music
- Genre: Classical
- Occupation: Pianist
- Labels: Naxos, Simax, Avi Music

Gunilla Süssmann (born 22 June 1977 in Bergen) is a Norwegian classical pianist.

== Career ==
Having played the piano since the age of six, Süssmann graduated from the Norwegian Academy of Music in 2002, and got her soloist diploma from the Music Academy in Hanover in 2003.

She released her first solo CD, Tockà (alluding to Russian тоска, toska, meaning "longing"), in 2005, performing selected works by Alexander Scriabin and Sergei Rachmaninoff. In 2007 she released her second CD, Malinconia, together with cellist Tanja Tetzlaff, featuring works by Rachmaninov, Edvard Grieg and Jean Sibelius.

== Discography (in selection) ==
=== Solo piano ===
- 2005: Tockà (NMA), piano sonatas by Alexander Scriabin & Sergey Rachmaninov

=== Collaborations ===
- 2002: Geirr Tveitt: Piano Concerto No. 4 "Aurora Borealis" (Naxos), with Håvard Gimse & the Royal Scottish National Orchestra conducted by Bjarte Engeset
- 2007: Malinconia (Avi Music), with Tanja Tetzlaff
- 2009: Catharinus Elling: Haugtussa and German Lieder (Simax Classics), with, Ann-Helen Moen (soprano)
- 2011: Brahms: Cello Sonatas (Avi Music), with Tanja Tetzlaff
- 2013: Boulanger, Hindemith, Debussy (Avi-Music), with C. Tetzlaff, A. Ibragimova, W. Li, V. Jacobsen, T. Tetzlaff, G. Rivinius, B. LaFolette, A. Hitaj, & L. Vogt
