= Jiri Hlinka =

Jiri Hlinka (Czech: Jiří Hlinka; born 1944) is a Norwegian professor and piano teacher of Czech origin. His most well-known student is Leif Ove Andsnes.

== Career ==
Hlinka was born in Prague, Protectorate of Bohemia and Moravia, and was a student of František Rauch and Josef Páleníček at the Prague Academy of Music. He started giving concerts in 1966 and reached the finals of the International Tchaikovsky Competition in Moscow the same year. He recorded Sergei Prokofiev's piano sonatas 2 and 6 for Supraphon in 1967. The album was released in Norway in 1998.

In 1970, he was forced to give up his soloist career for medical reasons and has since worked as a piano pedagogue. In 1972, he moved to Norway, obtaining Norwegian citizenship in 1982. He has taught at conservatories in Bergen and Oslo and regularly gives international master classes. Among his students are Leif Ove Andsnes, Håvard Gimse and Geir Botnen.

== Awards ==
Hlinka was awarded the Lindeman Prize in 1992 and the Grieg Prize in 1995. In 2004, he was awarded the King's Medal of Merit in gold and in 2007 the Gratias Agit Award for presenting Czech culture abroad. He was a Government scholar from 1995 to 2011.
