= Stein-Erik Olsen =

- Born: 8 September 1953 (age 73); Bergen, Hordaland, Norway
- Genres: Contemporary and classical music
- Occupation: Musician
- Instrument: Guitar
- Website: www.seolsen.com

Stein-Erik Olsen (born 8 September 1953) is a Norwegian classical guitarist and professor of guitar at the University of Bergen, known from collaborations with such as Gro Sandvik, Roar Engelberg and St Martin in the Fields and a series of recordings.

== Career ==
Olsen is a graduate of the Bergen Musikkonservatorium, the Norwegian Academy of Music and Paris Conservatoire National Supérieur de Musique. He has also studied under Per-Olof Johnson and Manuel Barrueco. Since 1992 Olsen has been Professor at the Bergen Musikkonservatorium, from 1995 the Grieg Academy, University of Bergen. He has given concerts all over Europe, with an international debut in Wigmore Hall, London in 1986.

The main focus of his work has always been to explore and record non-traditional music, often composed music developed in collaboration with various composers. In one of his latest releases Olsen reconstructed compositions for two guitars by guitar icon Ida Presti. This recording has received international attention and generated rave reviews, with interviews and stories in such Classical Guitar Magazine. In 2011, Olsen prepares recordings of guitar concerts with the chamber orchestra St Martin in the Fields.

== Discography (in selection) ==
=== Solo albums ===
- 1984: Homage (Simax Classics)
- 1985: Alveland (Kirkelig Kulturverksted)
- 1986: Panorama (Kirkelig Kulturverksted)
- 1986: Blue Sonata (Simax Classics)
- 1991: Songs & Dances (Simax Classics)
- 2005: 3-Way Project (Simax Classics)

=== Collaborative works ===
With Gro Sandvik

- 1986: Double Delight (Bergen Digital Studio)
- 1994: Diptych (Simax Classics)
- 2010: L'Espace Entre Nous, composed by Noel Zahler

With Roar Engelberg

- 1989: Mosaic (Kirkelig Kulturverksted)
- 1990: Doina (Kirkelig Kulturverksted)
- 1990: Caffè Europa (Kirkelig Kulturverksted)
- 2000: Sonata Mongoliana (Simax Classics)

With Olivier Chassain

- 2009: Les compositions de Ida Presti pour deux guitares (Simax Classics)
