= Hallgrímsson =

Hallgrímsson is a surname of Icelandic origin, meaning son of Hallgrímur. In Icelandic names, the name is not strictly a surname, but a patronymic. The name refers to:

- Asgeir Örn Hallgrimsson (b. 1984), Icelandic professional handball player
- Benedikt Hallgrimsson (b. 1967), Icelandic-Canadian biological anthropologist and evolutionary biologist
- Geir Hallgrímsson (1925–1990), Icelandic politician; Prime Minister of Iceland 1974–78; mayor of Reykjavík 1959–72
- Hafliði Hallgrímsson (b. 1941), Icelandic composer
- Jónas Hallgrímsson (1807–1845), Icelandic poet and author
- Hallgrim Eagle Hallgrimsson, fictional police officer from the Danish TV Series The Eagle: A Crime Odyssey
- Heimir Hallgrímsson, an Icelandic football manager and former player
- Matthías Hallgrímsson (born 1946), Icelandic footballer
- Viktor Gísli Hallgrímsson (born 2000), Icelandic handball player
