= Phantasm (early music band) =

Viol consort in England

Phantasm is a viol consort currently based in Germany. It was founded in 1994 by Laurence Dreyfus. It catapulted into international prominence when its debut CD won a Gramophone Award for the Best Baroque Instrumental Recording of 1997. Since then, they have released seventeen further recordings, won several awards, and in the words of their website, "have become recognised as the most exciting viol consort active on the world scene today".

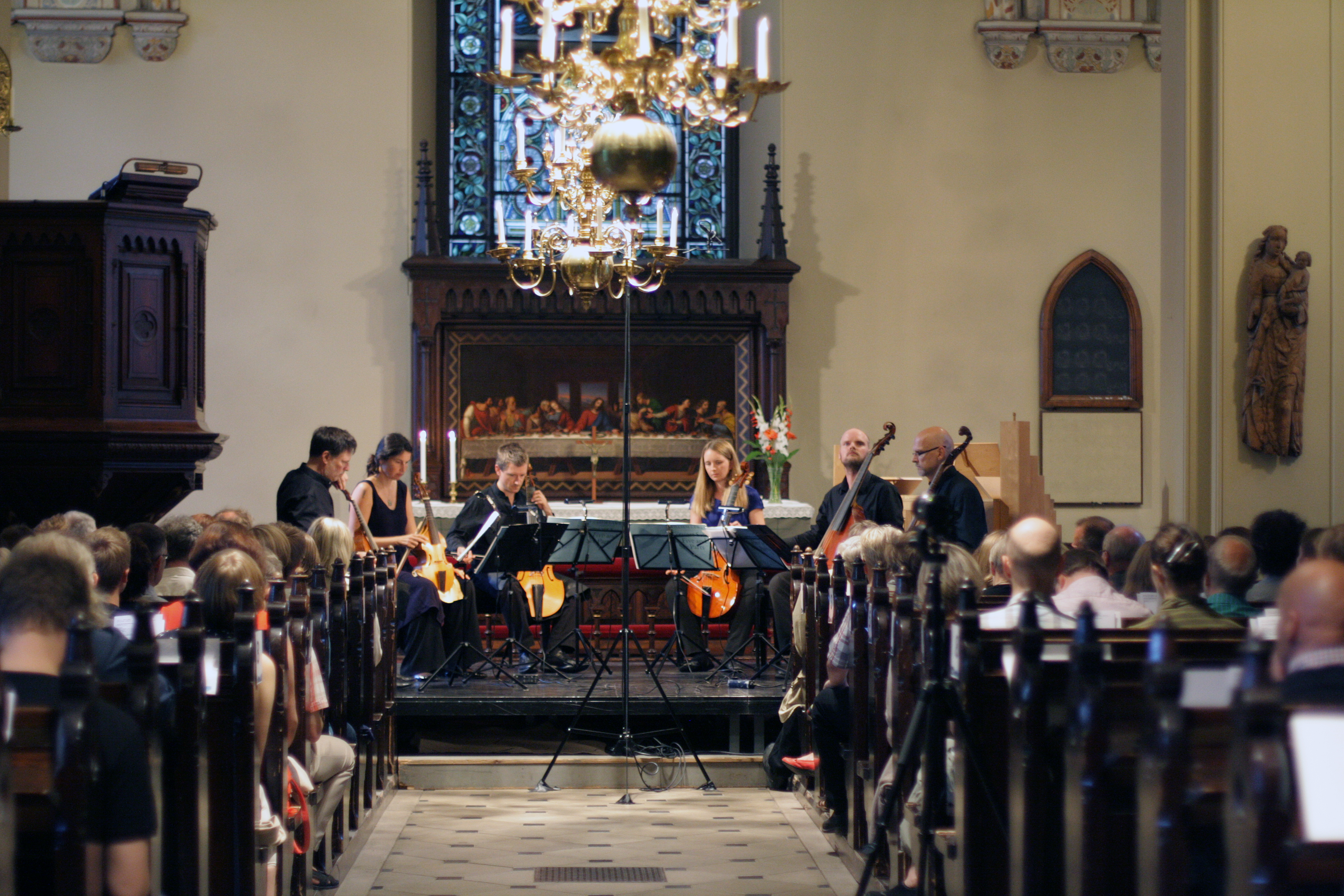
Phantasm in Finland

== History ==
In 2005 Phantasm were named Consort-in-Residence at Oxford University, where they regularly appeared at the Holywell Music Room and other University venues. In 2010, Phantasm became Consort-in-Residence at Magdalen College, Oxford where they perform in Magdalen College's Chapel and collaborate with Magdalen College Choir.

Since the beginning of 2016 PHANTASM – with its members hailing from the US, Britain and Finland – has established its new home in Berlin, Germany.

Critics have called their performances and recordings: 'intoxicating', 'revelatory', 'electrifying', 'interpretations pervaded by a truly burning spirit'.

The history of Phantasm and its recordings was featured on the Early Music Show, BBC Radio 3 with Lucie Skeaping, and they illustrated an audible 'history of English consort music' with BBC Radio 3 presenter Catherine Bott before their appearance at the Lufthansa Festival in London. Along with concerts at Magdalen College, Oxford, and at the Holywell Music Room (Oxford) they appeared at the Barcelona Early Music Festival in May 2009 with a concert of Purcell's Complete Fantasies and In Nomines, and at the Hong Kong International Music Festival in 2013.

Their CD, the complete five- and six-part works of the Jacobean composer John Ward for Linn Records, was launched after their final concert at the Utrecht Early Music Festival in 2011. The disc follows the success of Phantasm's 2007 CD, John Jenkins's Five-Part Consorts, which was a finalist for the Gramophone Award in Early Music, and for the MIDEM Classical Award in Early Music.] Their 2012 Lawes disc was a Finalist for a Gramophone Award in the Baroque Instrumental category.

They have also recorded on the Channel Classics Records, GMN, Simax, and Avie Records labels.

== Members ==
- Laurence Dreyfus, treble viol and director
- Jonathan Manson, tenor viol
- Markku Luolajan-Mikkola, bass viol
- Emilia Benjamin, treble and tenor viols
- Heidi Gröger, tenor and bass viols, violone
- Mikko Perkola. tenor and bass viols - emeritus member
- Wendy Gillespie, treble and tenor viols - emeritus member

== Discography ==
- Complete Fantasies for Viols by Henry Purcell - 1996
- Still Music of the Spheres by William Byrd and Richard Mico - 1997
- Art of Fugue by J. S. Bach - 1998
- Byrd Song by William Byrd with Ian Partridge and Geraldine McGreevy - 1999
- Consorts in Four and Five Parts by William Lawes - 2000
- Consort Music by Matthew Locke - 2001
- Consorts in Six Parts by William Lawes - 2002
- Consorts for Viols by Orlando Gibbons - 2005
- Four Temperaments - William Byrd, Alfonso Ferrabosco, Robert Parsons, Thomas Tallis - 2005
- Six-Part Consorts by John Jenkins - 2006
- Five-Part Consorts by John Jenkins - 2007
- William Byrd's "Complete Consort music" - 2011
- Consorts to the Organ by William Lawes - 2012
- Christopher Tye: Complete Consort Music
- Dowland: Lachrimae or Seven Tears - 2016
- Johann Sebastian Bach: The Art of Fugue - 2025

== Awards ==
- Henry Purcell's Complete Fantasies for Viols; 1997 Gramophone Award for baroque non-vocal performance.
- Orlando Gibbons's Consorts for Viols; 2004 Gramophone Award for early music.
