= Roar Engelberg =

- Born: 26 July 1964 (age 61); Hamar, Hedmark
- Origin: Norway
- Genres: Contemporary & classical music
- Occupation: Musician
- Instrument: Panpipes
- Website: Official website

Roar Engelberg (born 26 July 1964 in Hamar, Norway) is the first international Norwegian artist on Panpipes, known for his long lasting and productive cooperation with Stein-Erik Olsen.

== Career ==
Engelberg became interested in panpipes as a 12-year-old when he heard the Romanian panpipe player Georghe Zamfir on the radio. He then taught himself to play the instrument, and later studied in Hilversum with Nicolai Pirvu (1985–88). After his debut in London in 1986, he toured with Iver Kleive and Stein-Erik Olsen in Norway and around the world.

He received the 2007 award "Meritul Cultural în gradul de Cavaler" of the Romanian state for his many years of effort for the music of Romania.

== Honors ==
«Meritul Cultural în gradul de Cavaler" awarded by the Romanian state

== Discography ==
- 1985: Alveland, with Iver Kleive
- 1986: Panorama, with Iver Kleive og Stein-Erik Olsen
- 1988: Julefred
- 1989: Mosaic, with Stein-Erik Olsen
- 1989: Herdens flöjt – Julesånger på pan-flöjt
- 1990: Doina
- 1991: Masterpieces of the Beatles
- 1992: Café Europa 1992, with the Orchestra Primas
- 1994: Balletto, with Stein-Erik Olsen
- 1999: Har en drøm
- 2000: O pasâre strâinâ
- 2001: Fløyelstoner, with Stein-Erik Olsen
- 2002: Julefryd
- 2007: Inimǎ de lǎutar
- 2010: Suite Latina, with Stein-Erik Olsen
- 2011: Willie Nickerson's Egg, guest soloist with Jon Larsen and Tommy Mars
- 2024: Lofoten
