= Bergen Barokk =

Norwegian music ensemble

- Origin: Bergen, Norway
- Genres: classical music
- Years active: 1994–present
- Members: Mona Julsrud; Frode Thorsen; Markku Luolajan-Mikkola; Hans Knut-Sveen

Bergen Barokk is a Norwegian music ensemble that specializes in 17th and 18th century Western European music. They are supported by the city of Bergen and Arts Council Norway.
