= Geir Botnen =

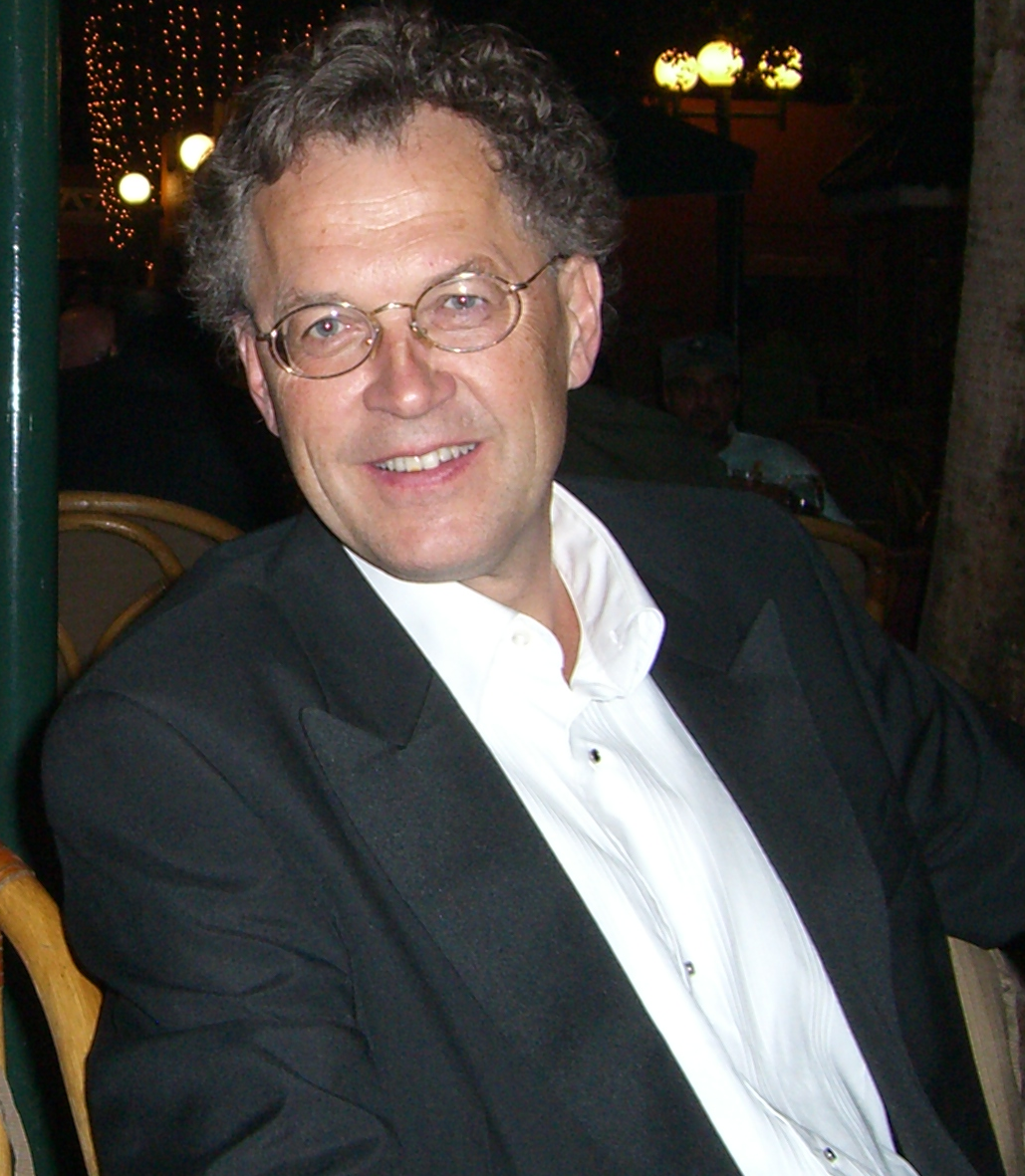

Background information
- Born: 27 February 1959 (age 67)
- Origin: Kvam Municipality, Norway
- Genres: Classical
- Occupation: Pianist
- Years active: 1983–present
- Labels: Aurora, Simax Classics, Lynor, Vest-Norsk Plateselskap, Barneselskapet

Geir Botnen (born 27 February 1959 in Kvam Municipality) is a Norwegian pianist. He focuses mainly on the works of Geirr Tveitt, but his repertoire also includes works by other composers.

== Biography ==
During his 5 years studies at the Bergen Music Conservatory with professor Jiri Hlinka, he demonstrated remarkable talent, and was invited to perform with the Bergen Philharmonic Orchestra. In 1982 he was the first Norwegian pianist to take part in the Tchaikovsky Competition in Moscow.

Botnen has been a soloist with a number of symphony orchestras both in Norway and in the US, playing under acclaimed maestros like Alan Gilbert, Arvid Jansons, Dmitri Kitayenko and Edward Serov.

As a solo recitalist and chamber musician he has concertized in the UK, US, Canada, China, Germany, Czech Republic, Sweden, Denmark and Norway. In 1993 Botnen was chosen to perform at the official opening of the Edvard Grieg Bicentennial Anniversary in Norway and on a tour of Asian capitals. Botnen is a regular guest at the Bergen International Festival and has performed at festivals in Norway and abroad, like Risør Chamber Music Fest, St. Magnus Festival Orkney Islands and others.

Botnen has been pivotal in the founding of and as artistic director of the annual Norwegian Hardingtonar Festival, focusing on the music of composer Geirr Tveitt. Botnen, a direct descendant of famous fiddle makers Isak and Trond Botnen, early acquired an interest in Geirr Tveitt's music. His recordings of Tveitt's "Fifty Folk Tunes from Hardanger" as well as other piano-works, has been exceptionally well received by critics. His CD recordings include works by Tveitt, Grieg and chamber music.
