= Benedikt Hallgrimsson =

Anthropologist and evolutionary biologist

- Born: 1967 (age 58–59); Reykjavík, Iceland

Academic background
- Education: BA, 1989, Anthropology, University of Alberta; MA, 1990, PhD, 1995, Anthropology, University of Chicago
- Thesis: Fluctuating asymmetry and maturational spans in mammals: implications for the evolution of prolonged development in primates (1995)

Benedikt Hallgrimsson FCAHS (born in 1967) is an Icelandic-Canadian biological anthropologist and evolutionary biologist. He is a Full Professor at the University of Calgary's Cumming School of Medicine and scientific director of the Alberta Children's Hospital Research Institute. Hallgrimsson studies birth defects and the developmental genetics of anatomical variation.

== Early life and education ==
Hallgrimsson was born in 1967 in Reykjavík, Iceland. After completing his Bachelor of Arts degree in anthropology from the University of Alberta in 1989, he enrolled at the University of Chicago for his Master's degree and PhD. As a graduate student at the University of Chicago, Hallgrimsson also accepted a Graduate Student Fellowship at the National Museum of Natural History in 1993 and became an Instructor of Anatomy at the University of Puerto Rico.

== Career ==
Upon receiving his PhD in 1995, Hallgrimsson became an assistant professor of anatomy at the University of Puerto Rico. While he was promoted to associate professor in 1998, he only remained at the institution until 2000. Hallgrimsson then joined the University of Calgary's (U of C) Department of Cell Biology and Anatomy. As the assistant dean for undergraduate science education, Hallgrimsson co-developed and directed U of C's Bachelor of Health Sciences program. Hallgrimsson was the 2001 recipient of the Basmajian/Lippincott Williams & Wilkins Award for his "demonstrated commitment to excellence in teaching in the anatomical sciences."

In 2018, Hallgrimsson was elected a Fellow of the American Association for the Advancement of Science. He was also appointed the Scientific Director for Basic Science at the Alberta Children's Hospital Research Institute (ACHRI). During the COVID-19 pandemic, Hallgrimsson co-led UCalgary's COVID-19 genomics research with Francois Bernier. Together, they tracked the spread and evolution of the virus to inform vaccine development. He also collaborated on a research project that aimed to use facial recognition software to develop better respirator options for children. In recognition of his academic accomplishments, Hallgrimsson was elected a Fellow of the Canadian Academy of Health Sciences. In 2022, Hallgrimsson was named Deputy Director of the ACHRI. While in this role, Hallgrimsson co-developed a 3D facial imaging computer program that could identify rare genetic diseases in children.
