= Kaipainen =

Kaipainen is a Finnish surname. Notable people with the surname include:

- Anu Kaipainen (1933–2009), Finnish writer
- Eino Kaipainen (1899–1995), Finnish actor
- Jouni Kaipainen (1956–2015), Finnish composer
- Osmo Kaipainen (1933–1985), Finnish physician and politician
