= Therese Birkelund Ulvo =

Norwegian composer and producer (born 1982)

Therese Birkelund Ulvo (born 24 November 1982) is a Norwegian composer and producer.

Birkelund Ulvo studied at the Norwegian Academy of Music from 2002 to 2008 and at the Guildhall School of Music in 2005 under the tutorship of Lasse Thoresen, Peter Tornquist and Diana Burrell.

From 2010 to 2012, Ulvo was part of MIC Music Information Centre Norway's international launch programme INTRO-composer. Ulvo was bestowed with the award De Unges Lindemanpris in 2015. In 2013, Ulvo composed the score for the play Heilage Sunniva, staged at the Bergen International Festival and the next year she was appointed artistic leadership of the festival Hardanger Musikkfest with singer and actor Tora Augestad. At the 63rd International Rostrum for composers in Wroclaw, Poland, held in May 2016, Ulvo's work Shadow and Shields was included in the Recommended Works general category, a selection of eleven works recommended for airplay in 30 participating European countries.

As the first of a total of six Norwegian composers, Ulvo was in October 2017 presented as a participant of the new KUPP-programme, an international developmental- and network-programme for young aspiring Norwegian composers initiated by the Norwegian Society of Composers, Talent Norge and Music Norway. The programme involves all of Norway's major symphony orchestras, all of which are required to commission new works from the programme's composers.

== Production ==
=== Selected works ===
- 2017 – Konsert for fiolin og sinfonietta, composed for Eira Bjørnstad Foss
- 2017 – Chemical Elements
- 2017 – Please don't Hesitate For orchestra
- 2016 – Postponed Action
- 2015 – Woven Fingerprints, concerto for two pianos and orchestra, commissioned by the Kristiansand Symphony Orchestra
- 2014 – Shadows And Shields, commissioned work for the Bergen Philharmonic Orchestra
- 2014 – Kropp/Umulig, chamber opera commissioned by Musikkteateret SAUM
- 2013 – Heilage Sunniva, score for play with same name staged at the Bergen International Festival
- 2012 – Bell Machinery, premiered by Ensemble Ernst for the opening of the Nordheim Centre during the 2012 Ultima Oslo Contemporary Music Festival
- 2012 – Thumbnail, piano work commissioned by Håvard Gimse
- 2012 – Silent Songs II og III, commissioned by Silje Aker Johnsen
- 2012 – Curious Endorsement, work for alto flute, bass clarinet and violin
- 2012 – Labyrint
- 2011 – The Fool's Game, commissioned work for improv trio BLY
- 2011 – SCULP -perkusjonstrio, commissioned by Pinquins
- 2011 – Bubbles, work for clarinet and piano premiered by BIT 20
- 2010 – 'cause nobody's like that – solo piano. Commissioned by Ellen Ugelvik
- 2010 – Apéritif – soprano, alt, piano, commissioned by Ensemble Fanfaronner
- 2009 – Dette har du sett før, soprano, clarinet, violin, perc, resitation
- 2009 – Simpel/Ny/Norsk/Musikk/Maskin (stryk det som ikkje høver)
- 2009 – Kjærlighetes valg,
- 2008 – Aurora
- 2008 – Grapple – piano, double bass, percussion
- 2008 – Silent Song – soprano and electronics
- 2007 – Fragile – solo Hardanger fiddle

=== Discography ===
- Bergen Philharmonic Orchestra, OPUS 250, featured work on the release: Shadows And Shields, (2015)
