= Forqueray =

Forqueray is the surname of a family of baroque French musicians and composers, and may refer to one of these articles below:

- Antoine Forqueray (1672–1745), composer and virtuoso of the viola da gamba, father of Jean-Baptiste.
- Jean-Baptiste Forqueray (1699–1782), composer and player of the viola da gamba, son of Antoine.
- Nicolas Gilles Forqueray (1703–1761), composer, second son of Antoine
- Michel II Forqueray (1681–1757), composer and organist, brother of Antoine

== See also ==
- Charles Fouqueray (1869–1956), painter (not related to the family)
