= Truls Mørk =

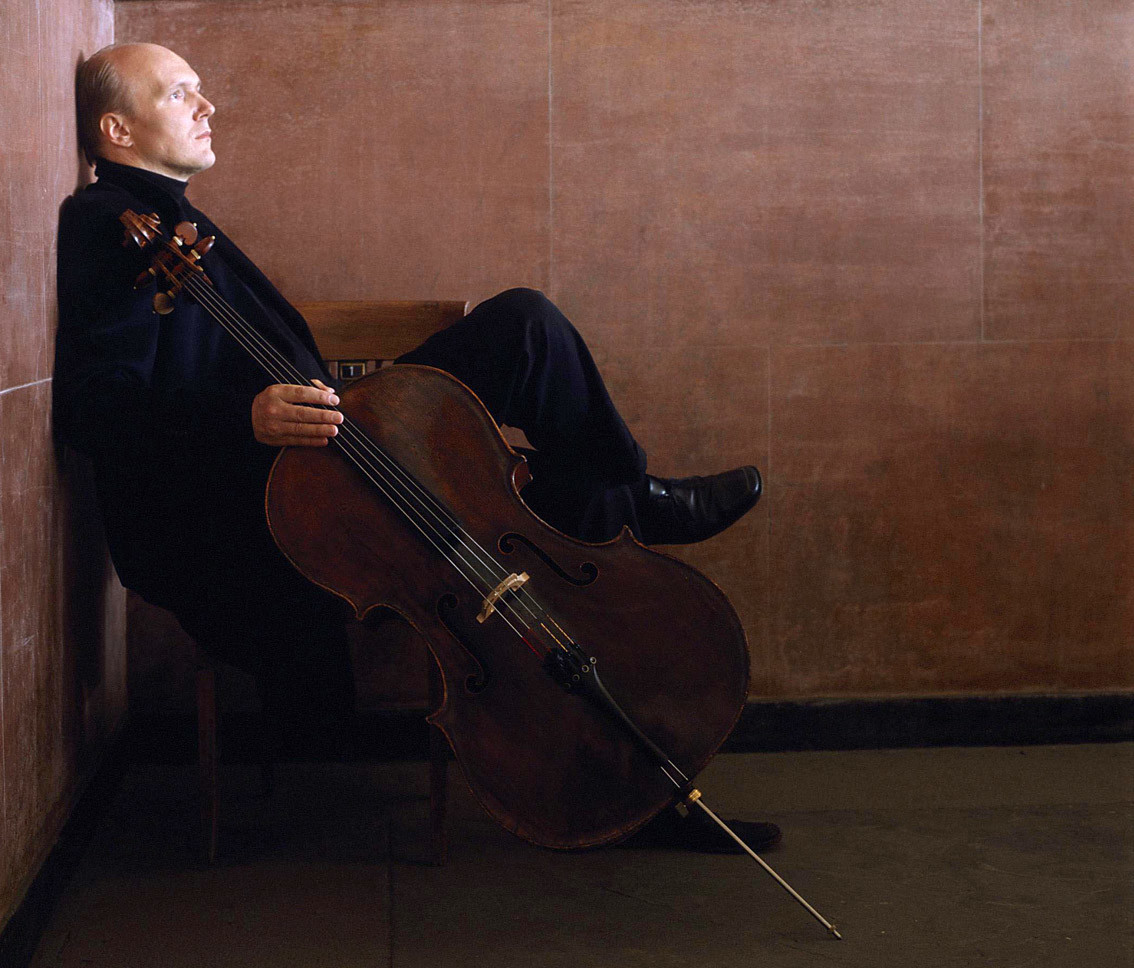

Background information
- Birth name: Truls Olaf Otterbech Mørk
- Born: 25 April 1961 (age 64); Bergen, Norway
- Origin: Norwegian
- Genres: Classical
- Occupation(s): Musician, music teacher
- Instrument: Cello
- Labels: Virgin Classics; Simax Classics; Deutsche Grammophon; Ondine
- Website: nmh.no/en/about_nmh/staff/truls-mork

Truls Olaf Otterbech Mørk (born 25 April 1961) is a Norwegian cellist.

== Biography ==
Mørk was born in Bergen, Norway to a cellist father, John Fritjof Mørk, and a pianist mother, Turid Otterbech. His mother began teaching him the piano when he was seven. Mørk also played the violin, but soon switched to the cello, taking lessons from his father.

Mørk began his studies with Frans Helmerson at 17 at Edsberg Music Institute. An admirer of Mstislav Rostropovich and the Russian school of cello, Mørk went on to study with the Russian cellist Natalia Shakhovskaya.

In 1982, Mørk became the first Scandinavian musician to reach the finals of the Tchaikovsky Competition in Moscow since Arto Noras in 1966, and won the sixth prize. He subsequently went on to win second prize at the 1986 Naumburg Competition in New York City and, in 1986, the Cassado Cello Competition in Florence. In 1989, he embarked on his first major concert tour, soloing with many of the finest orchestras of Europe. In 1994, he toured the United States with the Oslo Philharmonic, including debuts at Carnegie Hall and the Kennedy Center.

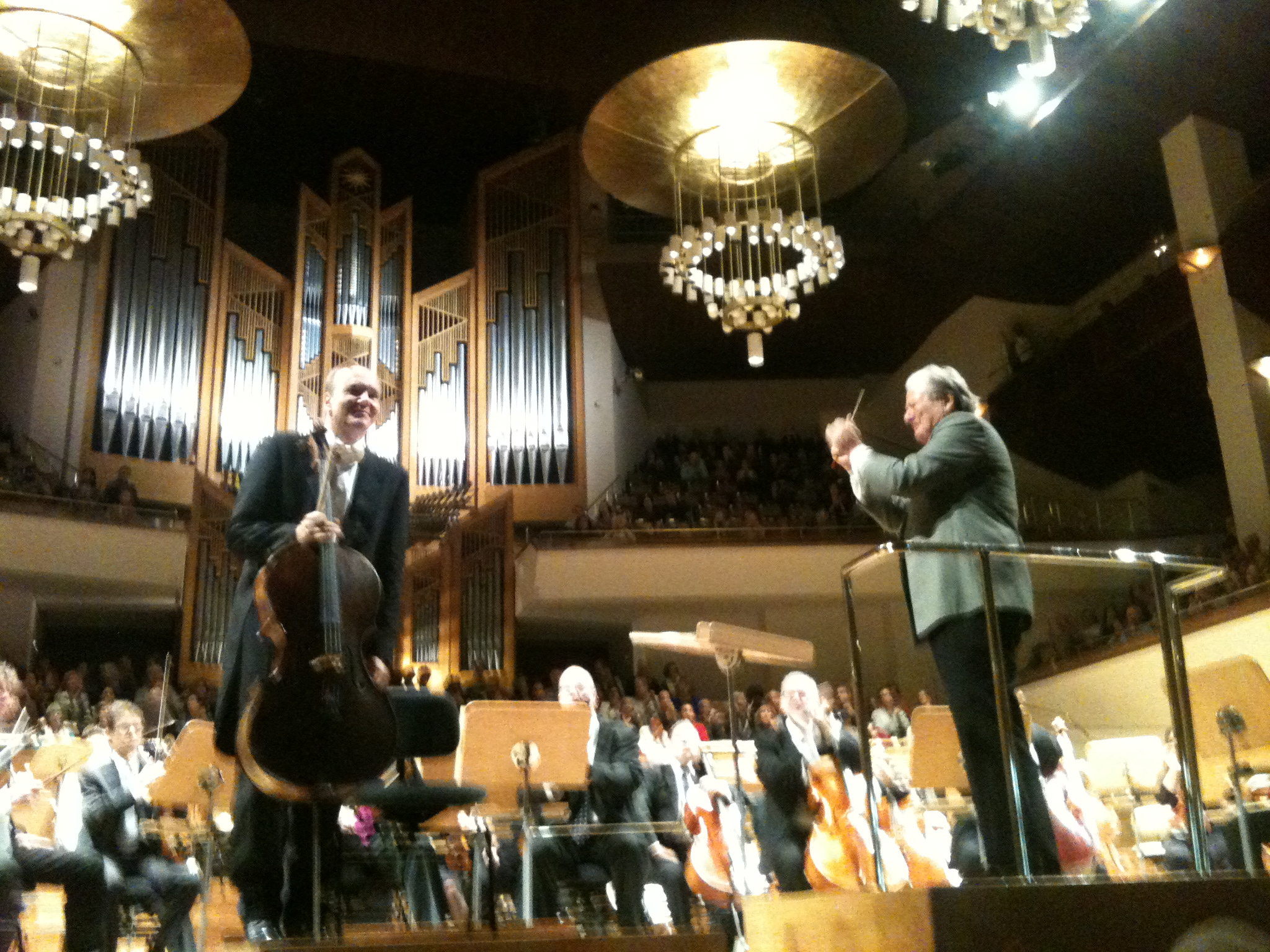
Mørk, Marriner, Orquesta Nacional de España, Auditorio Nacional, Madrid, 1 February 2015.

Mørk's discography includes an award-winning recordings of the Shostakovich Cello Concertos and of Bach's Suites for Solo Cello. He has recorded for such labels as Virgin Classics and harmonia mundi. Mørk's interest in chamber music led to the foundation of the International Chamber Music Festival of Stavanger.

In April 2009, Mørk experienced an infection of the central nervous system, presumably caused by a tick bite he received in the United States in 2006, with subsequent encephalitis, and paralysis in the shoulder muscles of the left arm. In the autumn of 2009, he expressed concern that he might never be able to perform again. After 18 months away from concert activity, during which time he was awarded the 2010 Sibelius Prize, Mørk resumed his career.

Mørk holds a Professorship at the Norwegian Academy of Music, Oslo. For more than 30 years, he performed on a rare Domenico Montagnana cello (Venice, 1723), whose scroll was made by Stradivarius. Norway's SR-Bank purchased the cello, and loaned it to him. The instrument was recently bought by the Dkfm. Angelika Prokopp Privatstiftung, which now loans it to cellist Harriet Krijgh.

== Honors ==
- 1991: Spellemannprisen in the category Chamber music, together with Håkon Austbø for the album Verker av Franck, Chausson, Debussy, Poulenc
- 1992: Spellemannprisen in the category Orchestral music for the album Joseph Haydn: Cello concerts, with Det Norske Kammerorkester cond Iona Brown
- 1993: Spellemannprisen in the category Orchestral music for the album Dvorák; Cello-konsert/Tsjaikovskij: Rokokko-variasjoner, with Oslo Philharmonic Orchestra cond. Mariss Jansons
- 1995: Spellemannprisen in the category Orchestral music for the album Sjostakovitsj: Cello Concerts, with London Philharmonic Orchestra cond. Mariss Jansons
- 1999: Spellemannprisen in the category Classical music, for the album Elgar: Cello Concert and Britten: Cello Symphony

== Discography (in selection) ==
=== Soloist ===
- 1987: Truls Otterbech Mørk, Arne Nordheim, George Crumb, Ingvar Lidholm, Zoltan Kodaly (Simax Classics)
- 1992: Joseph Haydn:Cello Concertos (Simax Classics), with The Norwegian Chamber Orchestra cond. Iona Brown
- 1993: Dvořák: Cello Concerto (Virgin Classics), with Oslo Philharmonic Orchestra cond. Mariss Jansons
- 1994: Grieg Cello Sonata / Sibelius Malingonia (Virgin Classics), with Jean-Yves Thibaudet
- 1995: Dmitri Shostakovich:Cello Concertos 1 & 2 (Virgin Classics), with The London Philharmonic Orchestra cond. Mariss Jansons
- 1996: Rachmaninov, Miaskovsky: Cello Sonatas (Virgin Classics), with Jean-Yves Thibaudet
- 1999: Elgar, Britten: Cello Concerto / Cello Symphony (Virgin Classics), with the City of Birmingham Symphony Orchestra cond. Sir Simon Rattle
- 2000: Benjamin Britten: Cellos Suites 1-3 (Virgin Classics)
- 2000: Harald Sæverud: Cello Concerto • Symphony No. 8, "Minnesota" (BIS Records), with Stavanger Symphony Orchestra cond. Ole Kristian Ruud
- 2001: Aaron Jay Kernis: Colored Field / Musica Celestis / Air (Virgin Classics), with Minnesota Orchestra cond. Eiji Oue
- 2002: Grieg: Cello Sonata / String Quartet (Edvard Grieg Museum, Virgin Classics)
- 2002: Henri Dutilleux: Tout Un Monde Lointain... / L'Arbre Des Songes / 3 Strophes Sur Le Nom De Sacher (Virgin Classics), with Renaud Capuçon and the Orchestre Philharmonique de Radio France cond. Myung-Whun Chung
- 2004: Arvo Pärt: Pro & Contra (Virgin Classics), with the Estonian National Symphony Orchestra cond. Paavo Järvi
- 2005: Johann Sebastian Bach: Cello Suites (Virgin Classics)
- 2006: Reflection (Deutsche Grammophon), with Hélène Grimaud, Anne Sofie Von Otter and Staatskapelle Dresden cond. Esa-Pekka Salonen
- 2007: Matthias Pintscher: En Sourdine (Kairos Records), with Frank Peter Zimmermann, Christophe Desjardins, Ensemble Intercontemporain, NDR Sinfonieorchester, Matthias Pintscher
- 2007: Vadim Repin, Brahms: Violin Concerto - Double Concerto (Deutsche Grammophon), with Vadim Repin and the Gewandhausorchester cond. Riccardo Chailly
- 2009: Haflidi Hallgrímsson: Cello Concerto / Herma (Ondine Records), with the Scottish Chamber Orchestra cond. John Storgårds
- 2012: Einojuhani Rautavaara: Modificata / Incantations (Percussion Concerto) / Towards The Horizon (Cello Concerto No. 2) (Ondine Classics), with Colin Currie, Truls Mørk and the Helsinki Philharmonic Orchestra cond. John Storgårds
- 2016: Camille Saint-Saëns : Cello Concertos Nos 1 and 2, Africa, Caprice-Valse "Wedding-cake", Hélène Mercier, piano, Louis Lortie, piano, Bergen Philharmonic Orchestra, dir. Neeme Järvi, (SACD Chandos)

=== Compilations ===
- 1993: Movements (Statoil), with Leif Ove Andsnes, Ole Edvard Antonsen, Marianne Thorsen
- 1995: Andsnes, Antonsen, Mørk (EMI Classics)
- 2004: Cello Concertos (Virgin Classics), 5xCD
- 2005: Haydn: Violin Concertos • Cello Concertos (Virgin Classics), 2xCD
- 2006: Chostakovitch: Cello Concertos (EMI Classics), 5xCD
- 2013: Truls Mørk - Greatest Cello Concertos (Erato\Warner Classics), 9XCD
