= Gro Sandvik =

Norwegian musician

Gro Schibsted Sandvik
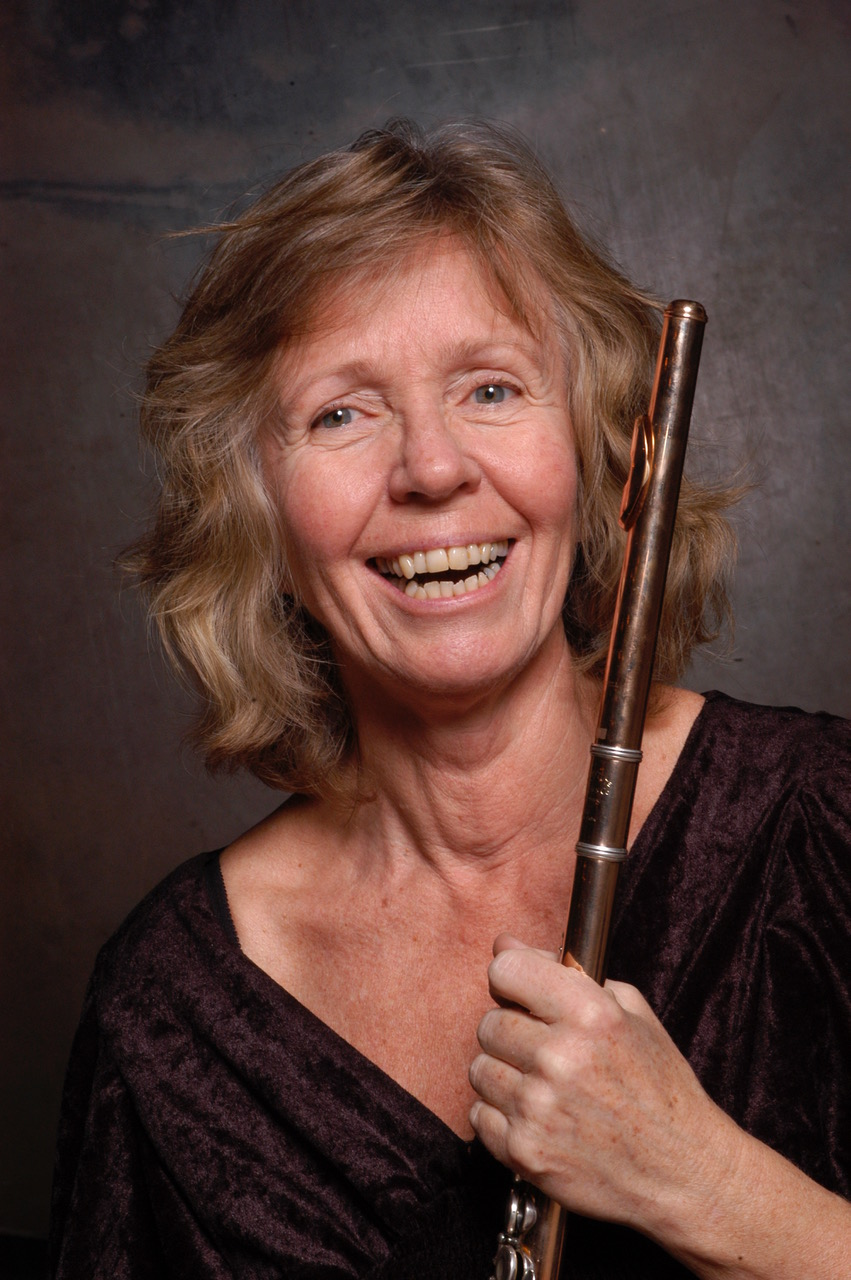

Background information
- Born: Gro Schibsted Sandvik; 2 October 1942 (age 83); Sarpsborg
- Origin: Norway
- Genres: Contemporary, classical music
- Occupation: Musician
- Instrument: Flute
- Website: www.uib.no/persons/Gro.Sandvik

Gro Schibsted Sandvik has served as principal flute of the Bergen Philharmonic 1967-2004. She held the position from 1964 with Stavanger Symphony orchestra. Since 1967 she is a member of Bergen Woodwind Quintet, one of the worlds leading chamber music groups, performing to great acclaim the world over. The quintet has for 21 years been named Visiting Guest Artists in residence at the University of Minnesota.

She is a soloist and chamber music performer, which includes works written for her, and the Scandinavian premier of John Corigliano's Concerto for Flute, bringing 100 flute-playing children on stage.

She studied with mime and Acting Professor Emeritus Bud Beyer and Marcel Moyse.

== Career ==
In 1965 Sandvik began teaching at the Grieg Academy, University of Bergen and from 1999 she holds a professorship in music performance. She was a guest lecturer and flute educator. She was involved in a collaboration on the presentation of Icelandic, Polish and Norwegian composers for young flautists. She taught at the National Flute Association Convention in Albuquerque 2007. She has conducted Master Classes, given concerts and participated in the Pedagogic Panel at Honolulu University, Wichita State University, University of Minnesota, St. Olaf College, University of Wisconsin-Eau Clair, Concordia College, North Park College, Northwestern University, University of Northern Illinois, Ohio University, Peabody Conservatory, Wayne State University, Eastern Iowa Flute Association, Northern Iowa Flute Association, Upper Midwest Flute Association, University of Belgium, Kuopio Conservatory, Royal Northern College of Music, Costa Rica Music Conservatory, Shepherd School of Music-Rice University, Paderewski Academy (Poznan, Polen), Iceland Academy of the Arts, Norwegian Academy of Music.

Sandvik has held positions on committees pertaining to Norwegian musical education and performance. 2012 she had several weeks of teaching at Western Michigan University. For the Academic year 2006/07 she was Visiting Professor of Flute at The University of Iowa.

She has recorded with the Bergen Woodwind Quintet and guitarist professor Stein-Erik Olsen. The music on the release “Chromos” with pianist professor Einar Røttingen, brings to the fore newly written works for flute and piano.

She is an Honorary Member of the Norwegian Flute Society and the Bergen Chamber Music Society. November 2012 she was awarded the King´s Medal of Merit.

== Discography (in selection) ==
With Stein-Erik Olsen

- 1986 Double Delight, BD 7004
- 1994 Diptych PSC 1083
- 2010 Léspace entre nous, PSC 1268
- 2015 Ketil Hvoslef: Seonveh, Double Concerto, PSC 1339

With The Bergen Wind Quintet

- 1983 The Bergen Wind Quintet, BIS CD-291
- 1989 Carl Nielsen – Wind chamber music, BIS CD-428
- 1990 Pauline Hall (Suite for wind quintet) PSC 3105
- 1993 The Bergen Wind Quintet, PSC-1094
- 1998 Blue Dawn into white heat, INNOVA 517
- 2000 Oystein Sevaag Early Works, Siddharta records / BMG 74321, 767262
- 2001 The Adaskin Collection, AdLar Music MM 105
- 2002 David Maslanka: The Bergen Wind Quintet, BIS CD-1228
- 2008 J. Francaix: Quintets, Quartet, Divertissement, BIS-SACD-2008
- 2009 Sunday sessions, MPR

With Einar Røttingen

- 2007 Chromos, PPC 9059

Various

- 1998 Speculum Regale, compositions by J. Blaauw, VEST-LYD 1998
- 2010 Romanza, 2L-065-SACD
- 2010 Gardens of Hokkaido, ACD 5072
- 2010 New works for flute by Poznan-based composers, AP 0245
- 2011 Flute Friends, AP 0204
- 2013 K. Sivertsen: Dragning, Brevet til Louise, ARCD 1301
- 2015 Ketil Hvoslef II: Octet LWC 1081
- 2016 Ketil Hvoslef III: Sextet LWC 1117

A total of 153 works recorded with the Bergen Philharmonic Orchestra.
