= Johan Henrik Freithoff =

Norwegian violinist and composer

Johan Henrik Freithoff (1713 – 24 June 1767) was a Norwegian violinist and composer.

== See also ==
- List of Norwegian composers
