= Laurence Dreyfus =

American musicologist (born 1952)

Laurence Dreyfus FBA
- Born: July 28, 1952 (age 74); Boston, Massachusetts, United States
- Education: Yeshiva University; Juilliard School; Columbia University; Brussels Conservatoire
- Occupations: Musicologist, lecturer
- Years active: 1980–present
- Musical career
- Origin: Cherry Hill, New Jersey, United States
- Instrument: Viola da gamba
- Years active: 1995–present

Laurence Dreyfus FBA (born July 28, 1952) is an American musicologist and player of the viola da gamba who was University Lecturer and fellow of Magdalen College, Oxford.

== Early life ==
Dreyfus was born and raised in Boston, Massachusetts, and lived in Cherry Hill, New Jersey, where he attended Cherry Hill High School West. He earned a B.A. at Yeshiva University, studied cello under Leonard Rose at the Juilliard School, and earned his Ph.D. in musicology at Columbia University, where he studied with the distinguished Bach scholar Christoph Wolff. Commuting from New York, he studied viola da gamba with Wieland Kuijken, earning two diplomas from the Brussels Conservatoire, including its Diplome supérieur with Highest Distinction.

== Career ==
Dreyfus taught at Yale University between 1982 and 1989, initially as an assistant professor and then as an associate professor from 1988. He was then an associate professor at The University of Chicago (1989–90) and Stanford University (1990–93), before he moved in 1992 to London to become Professor of Performance Studies in Music at King's College London and hold a chair at the Royal Academy of Music. He was appointed Thurston Dart Professor of Performance Studies in Music in 1996. In 2002, he was elected a fellow of the British Academy for his musicological work and in 2005 left King's to be a fellow of Magdalen College, Oxford, where he remained until retiring in 2015. He was also Professor of Music at the University of Oxford from 2006 until retirement.

Dreyfus is a noted scholar of both J. S. Bach and Richard Wagner. He has published three books with Harvard University Press: Bach's Continuo Group (1986), Bach and the Patterns of Invention (1996) (which won the Otto Kinkeldey Award for best book of the year from the American Musicological Society) and Wagner and the Erotic Impulse (2010). His 2025 book, Parsifal's Seduction, deals with Hermann Levi's relation to Wagner and Parsifal.

As a performer, Dreyfus has made a number of solo and ensemble recordings, some of which have won major awards. As a soloist, he has recorded the viola da gamba sonatas of J. S. Bach, the Pièces de violes of Marin Marais, and Pièces de clavecin en concert of Jean-Philippe Rameau, all with harpsichordist Ketil Haugsand on the Simax label. He founded the viol consort Phantasm, which won one Gramophone Award in 1997 for their recording of Purcell's Fantasies and another in 2004 for its recording of Consorts by Orlando Gibbons; this disc was also a finalist for Gramophone's Record of the Year. Their 2005 CD Four Temperaments, with Elizabethan music by William Byrd, Alfonso Ferrabosco the younger, Robert Parsons and Thomas Tallis was nominated for awards by Gramophone and the BBC Music Magazine. The group has also recorded works by William Byrd, John Jenkins, William Lawes, Richard Mico, Matthew Locke, and other composers, as well as Bach's The Art of Fugue.

== Views ==
In August 2015, Dreyfus was a signatory to a letter criticising The Jewish Chronicle's reporting of Corbyn's association with alleged antisemites.
