= Virgin Veritas =

Virgin Veritas is an imprint of French classical music record label Virgin Classics dedicated to early music and historically informed performance. The parent was formerly owned by Virgin Records and was Virgin's classical label until acquisition by EMI, and then subsequent 2012 acquisition by Universal Music. Following acquisition by EMI the imprint was also used to reissue earlier early music recordings from the EMI Electrola and EMI Reflexe imprints.
