= Det Norske Kammerorkester =

Norwegian orchestra

Det Norske Kammerorkester or The Norwegian Chamber Orchestra (established in 1977) is a chamber orchestra based in Oslo.

== Biography ==
The orchestra was founded by the violinist Bjarne Fiskum who got the idea for a summer course for young string talents summer 1975. Since its foundation the orchestra has recorded some 20 albums and been on numerous tours in Norway, Europe, Asia and United States. The orchestra has since 1995 held Oslo Vinternattsfestival each year. Awarded Spellemannprisen a total of six times, including This years Spellemann (Player of the Year) in 1988, the orchestra is one of the most successful artists regardless of genre.

Terje Tønnesen was the artistic director of the orchestra from its inception until August 2021. Iona Brown was artistic director of the orchestra from 1981 to 2001, ea position she shared with Tønnesen. Since 2002, in addition Leif Ove Andsnes been the orchestra's principal guest conductor. Since 2009, violinist Isabelle van Keulen has been associated with the orchestra as artistic director juxtaposed with Terje Tønnesen. Guest-Conductors have included Donald Covert. Since 2021, the orchestra has been led by Pekka Kuusisto.

The Norwegian Chamber Orchestra is a project orchestra where musicians of the orchestra varies from project to project. The orchestra aims to bring together the best musicians in Norway to each project, capturing musicians from several of the Norwegian orchestras focusing on musicians from Oslo Philharmonic Orchestra, as well as extensive use of freelance musicians. The orchestra also tries to bring home the Norwegian musicians who work abroad for several of its projects. However, it is always a core of members who are helping to keep the continuity of the orchestra.

The orchestra produces 30-40 concerts annually and has a separate series in Oslo. In addition, the orchestra travels on separate tours in Norway, as well as visiting a number of festivals throughout the country. The orchestra has no permanent concert venue, but playing their concerts in Oslo in both Den Norske Opera, Oslo Concert Hall, Gamle Logen and a number of churches. The orchestra had for many years the University Hall in Oslo as the main arena, and when this will again open in 2011, will continue to play several of their concerts there.

The orchestra is funded through grants from the Norwegian government, and Oslo. Public support is ca. 50% of the funding. Other revenue comes from ticket sales, sales of concerts and sponsorship revenue.

== Awards and honors ==
- 1983: Griegprisen
- 1988: Kassettavgiftsfondet's international launch scholarship of the amount of 500 000,- Norwegian kroner
- 1988: Spellemannprisen as Spellemann of the Year
- 1988: Spellemannprisen 1988 in the class Classical / contemporary music for Britten/Mozart/Tchaikovsky
- 1992: Spellemannprisen in the class Orchestral music for Joseph Haydn: Cellokonserter (with Truls Mørk as soloist and conductor: Iona Brown)
- 1996: Spellemannprisen in the class Orchestral music for Grieg and Nielsen: musikk for strykeorkester (conductor: Iona Brown)
- 1999: Spellemannprisen in the class Contemporary music for Rolf Wallin: Boyl (with Oslo Filharmoniske orkester and Oslo Sinfonietta)
- 2000: Gramophones konsertpris for Haydn: Pianokonsert nr. 3, 4 og 11 (med Leif Ove Andsnes som leder og solist)
- 2000: Spellemannprisen in the class Classical / contemporary music for Haydn: Pianokonsert nr. 3, 4 og 11 (with Leif Ove Andsnes as conductor and soloist)

== Discography ==
- 2000: Haydn: Piano Concertos Nos. 3, 4 & 11 (EMI Classics), with Leif Ove Andsnes as conductor & soloist
- 2004: Mozart: Piano Concertos 9 & 18 (EMI Classics), with Leif Ove Andsnes as conductor and soloist
- 2005: Haydn: Violin Concertos • Cello Concertos (Virgin Classics), with Christian Tetzlaff, Truls Mørk & Northern Sinfonia, conductors: Heinrich Schiff & Iona Brown
- 2007: Haydn*, Albinoni, Neruda, Hummel: Trumpet Concertos (Simax Classics), with Tine Thing Helseth
- 2008: Village Variations (Jaro Medien), with the Moscow Art Trio
- 2008: Mozart: Piano Concertos 17 & 20 (EMI Classics), with Leif Ove Andsnes as conductor & soloist
- 2013: Nordic Spring (Simax Classics)
