= Terje Mikkelsen =

Norwegian conductor (born 1957)

Terje Wik Mikkelsen
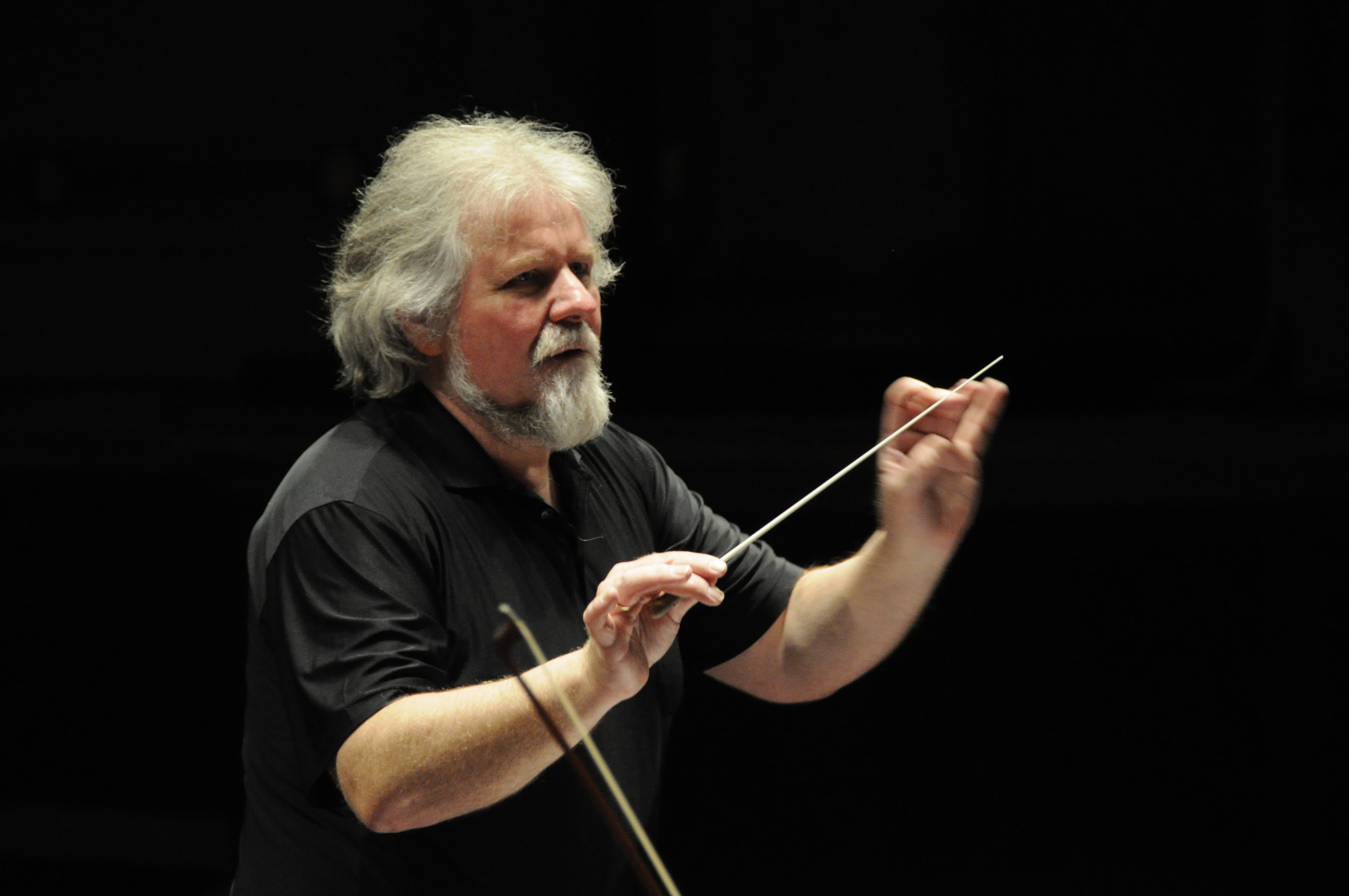
- Born: 6 April 1957 (age 69); Drøbak, Norway
- Occupation: Musical conductor
- Years active: 1984–present
- Website: http://www.terjemikkelsen.com

Terje Wik Mikkelsen (born 6 April 1957 in Drøbak, south of Oslo) is an acknowledged Norwegian conductor with his main career in Europe and Asia.

He graduated from the Norwegian Academy of Music, and later studied orchestral conducting with Professor Jorma Panula at Sibelius Academy in Helsinki where he got his diploma. From 1984 to 1991 he studied with Mariss Jansons in Oslo and St. Petersburg. In 2001 he was appointed visiting professor with the college of music of the Mahidol University in Bangkok. Since 2021 Mikkelsen has regularly conducted The Presidential Symphony Orchestra in Ankara.

== Musical posts ==
- Ukrainian State Symphony Orchestra, Chief Conductor (1993-1994)
- Lithuanian State Symphony Orchestra, Principal Guest Conductor (1989-1993)
- Latvian National Symphony Orchestra, Chief Conductor (1997-2001), Principal Guest Conductor (2001–05)
- Thuringen Philharmonie Gotha-Suhl, GDM and Chief Conductor (1999-2003)
- Shanghai Symphony Orchestra, Principal Conductor (2006-2009)
- Tchaikovsky Symphony Orchestra Moscow Radio, Principal Guest Conductor (2009-2012)

== Tours ==
Terje Mikkelsen regularly appears with the Moscow Radio Orchestra, has given a number of concerts with orchestras such as St. Petersburg Philharmonic, Warszaw Philharmonic, Cologne Radio Orchestra (WDR), Hamburg Radio Orchestra (NDR), Rotterdam Philharmonic Orchestra, Belgian Radio Orchestra, BBC Welsh Symphony Orchestra, BBC Concert Orchestra, China National Symphony Orchestra, Vietnam National Symphony Orchestra, Thailand Philharmonic Orchestra, Munich Radio Orchestra and the Philharmonia Hungarica. He has conducted a large number of tours with both his regular- and other orchestras. With the Tchaikovsky Symphony Orchestra, he conducted two concerts in the Disney Hall, Los Angeles in 2008, and in 2010 fifteen concerts in England and two at the Festival of North Norway. In Spain he has conducted more than 100 concerts with Thuringen Philharmonie, Latvian National Symphony Orchestra, Shanghai Symphony Orchestra, Jena Philharmonic Orchestra, Munich Radio Orchestra, Academy of St Martin in the Fields, Ukrainian State Symphony Orchestra and Norrlandsoperan (Sweden). With the Czech National Orchestra, he visited Great Britain in 2011 and with the Russian State Symphony Orchestra (Yevgeny Svetlanov's former orchestra), South America in 2015. He has also made a number of productions towards jazz, rock, film and light music for radio and TV. With Keith Emerson, the guitarist Marc Bonilla and the BBC Concert Orchestra he conducted a performance of Three Fates Project in Barbican Hall, London, in July 2015. In April 2018, he toured South America with The Russian State Symphony Orchestra (Svetlanov Orchestra).

== Discography ==
=== A selection of Mikkelsen's 50 CD-recordings ===
- A complete series of orchestral works by Edvard Grieg (Lithuanian State Symphony Orchestra).
- Edvard Grieg; Peer Gynt Suite 1 & 2 - Johan Svendsen: Romance for Violin and Orchestra. (Shanghai Symphony Orchestra)
- 3 CDs with music by Johan Svendsen (Latvian National Symphony Orchestra)
- Finn Mortensen’s Symphony and other orchestral works (Munich Radio Orchestra)
- Carl Nielsen: Violin Concerto (Henrik Hannisdal, violin - Norwegian Radio Orchestra).
- Peter Tchaikovsky; Symfoni No 5 in E Minor, Op. 64 (Ukrainian State Symphony Orchestra)
- Adrien Francois Serais: Souvenir de Spa (Wen-Sinn Yang, cello - Munich Radio Orchestra)
- Keith Emerson: Beyond the Stars. (Academy of St Martin in the Fields). Abbey Road Studios. To the memory of Keith Emerson who died in 2016. Released on Emerson's birthday November 2, 2018.
- Peter Tchaikovsky: Rococo Variations; Antonin Dvorak: Cello Concerto. (Sandra Lied Haga, cello; The State Academic Symphoy Orcehstra of Russia - Svetlanov Orchestra). (Simax Classics) Recorded in the Moscow Conservatory Great Hall in 2019, where Mikkelsen the same year started giving masterclass to conducting students at the conservatory.

=== World premiere recordings ===
- Johan Halvorsen: Complete stage music. (Latvian National Symphony Orchestra).
- Thomas Tellefsen: Piano Concertos. (Einar Steen-Nøkleberg, piano - Trondheim Symphony Orchestra) - nominated to the Norwegian Grammy Award 2005.
- Ole Olsen: Symfoni, Aasgaardsreien, Suite for String Orchestra (Latvian National Symphony Orchestra)
- Eyvind Alnæs: Symphony Nos 1 and 2 (Latvian National Symphony Orchestra)
- Keith Emerson / Marc Bonilla: Three Fates Project (Munich Radio Orchestra)
- Carl Davidoff: Cello Concerto No 1 & 2 (Wen-Sinn Yang, cello - Latvian National Symphony Orchestra)
- Carl Davidoff: Cello Concerto No 3 & 4 (Wen-Sinn Yang, cello - Shanghai Symphony Orchestra)
- Romualds Kalsons: Concertos for Violin, and Cello, Symphonic Variations. (Valdis Zarigs, violin - Agnese Rugevica, cello - Latvian National Symphony Orchestra)
- Havana - Rio - Moscow (Stein Erik Olsen, guitar - Academy of St Martin in the Fields)
