= Iona Brown =

British violinist and conductor (1941–2004)

OBE Iona Brown
- Iona Brown playing as a violinist with Neville Marriner and the Academy of St Martin-in-the-Fields
- Born: 7 January 1941; Salisbury, England
- Died: 5 June 2004 (aged 63); Salisbury, England
- Education: Cranborne Chase School
- Spouse: Bjorn Arnils
- Relatives: Timothy Brown (brother)

Iona Brown, OBE, (7 January 1941 – 5 June 2004) was a British violinist and conductor.

== Early life and education ==
Elizabeth Iona Brown was born in Salisbury and was educated at Cranborne Chase School, Dorset. Her parents, Antony and Fiona, were both musicians. Her brother Timothy has been principal horn of the BBC Symphony Orchestra, her other brother Ian is a pianist and her sister Sally plays viola in the Bournemouth Symphony Orchestra.

== Career ==
From 1963 to 1966, Brown played violin in the Philharmonia Orchestra. In 1964, she joined the Academy of St Martin in the Fields, working her way up through the ranks to become leader, solo violinist and director in 1974. She formally left the Academy in 1980, but continued to work with them for the rest of her life.

In 1981, she was appointed artistic director of the Norwegian Chamber Orchestra. King Olav V of Norway later awarded her the accolade Knight of First Class Order of Merit for her success with the NCO. She directed the Los Angeles Chamber Orchestra from 1987 to 1992. She was dismissed as conductor by Executive Director Deborah Rutter because of an inability to commit to more than six weeks per season with the orchestra due to her other posts, a decision she protested. Brown ultimately returned as the orchestra's principal conductor from 1995 to 1997 following a change in the orchestra's leadership. From 1985 to 1989, she was guest director of the City of Birmingham Symphony Orchestra. As her health declined and her arthritis progressed, she shifted her focus from the violin to conducting, ending her violin career in 1998. In her last years, she was chief conductor of the South Jutland Symphony Orchestra of Denmark.

From 1968 to 2004, Brown's principal residence was in the Wiltshire village of Bowerchalke. When she took part in the BBC Radio 4 programme Kaleidoscope, explaining how hard it was to play her signature piece The Lark Ascending by Ralph Vaughan Williams, she said that the singing of larks she heard during long walks on nearby Marleycombe Down influenced the way she played it.

== Honours ==
She was made an Officer of the Order of the British Empire in 1986, and in June 2003 was made an honorary Doctor of the University by the Open University.

== Death ==
She died of cancer in 2004 at age 63 in Salisbury. She was married twice, and was survived by her second husband, Bjorn Arnils.

== Partial discography ==
=== As solo violinist ===
- Fantasia on a Theme by Thomas Tallis; The Lark Ascending; Five Variants of Dives and Lazarus, Ralph Vaughan Williams. Academy of St. Martin-in-the-Fields; Neville Marriner, cond. (1972 recording. Issued on Decca; reissued on CD as Argo 414 595–2 and Philips 426 005-2).
- Violin Concerto No.2, Béla Bartók. Philharmonia Orchestra; Simon Rattle, cond. (1980 recording. Issued on Argo ZRG 936, 1982).
- Sonatas for Violin and Continuo Op 1, George Frederic Handel. Denis Vigay, cello; Nicholas Kraemer, harpsichord. (1982 recording. Issued on Philips 412 603, 1982).

=== As director and violinist ===
- La Cetra, Op. 9, Antonio Vivaldi. Academy of St. Martin-in-the-Fields. (1978 recording. 3-LP set, Argo D99D3)
- The Four Seasons, Antonio Vivaldi. Academy of St. Martin-in-the-Fields. (1979 recording. Philips 9500 7 17)
- 12 Concerti Grossi Op. 6, George Frideric Handel. Academy of St. Martin-in-the-Fields. (1983 digital recording. 3-LP set, Philips 6769 083)
- 5 Violin Concertos, Georg Philipp Telemann, Academy of St. Martin-in-the-Fields. (1983 digital recording. CD: Philips 411 125–2)

=== As director ===
- Cello Concerto in C Major (H. VIIb1); Cello Concerto in D Major, Op.101 (H. VIIb2), Joseph Haydn. Academy of St. Martin-in-the-Fields; Mstislav Rostropovich, cello. (1976 recording. EMI 66 150 4)
- Organ Concerto / Concert Champêtre, Francis Poulenc. Academy of St. Martin-in-the-Fields; George Malcolm, organ / harpsichord. (1979 recording. Decca 448 270-2DF2)
