= Lars Anders Tomter =

Norwegian viola player (born 1959)

Lars Anders Tomter (born 30 November 1959 in Furnes) is a Norwegian viola player. He plays on a 1590 Gasparo da Salò viola.
