= Bjarte Engeset =

Norwegian classical conductor

Bjarte Engeset (born 25 August 1958 in Ørsta Municipality) is a Norwegian classical conductor.

== Biography and career ==
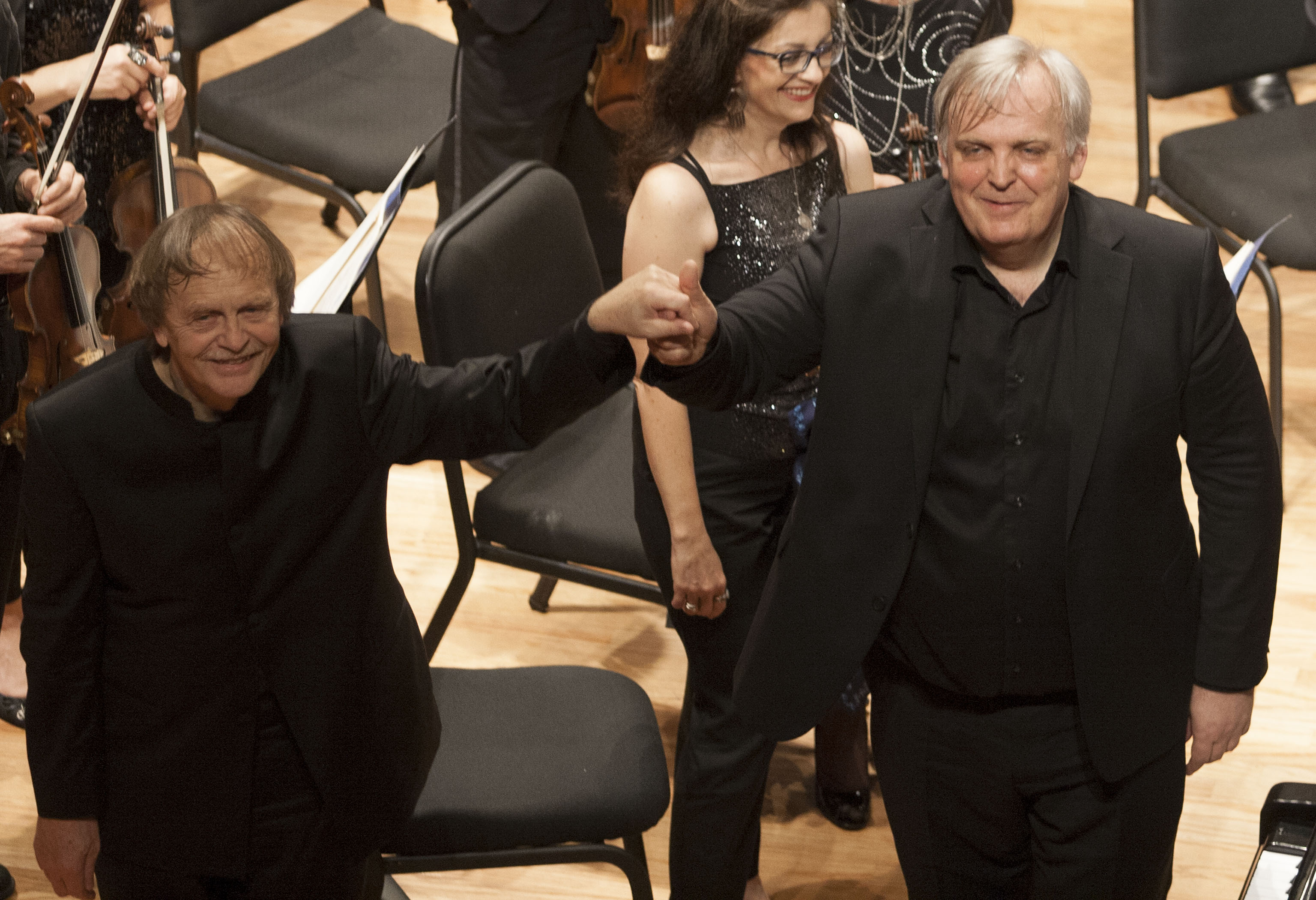
Bjarte Engeset (right) and concert pianist Hakon Austbo in Mexico City on 2015.

Bjarte Engeset studied music at the University of Georgia, Grieg Akademiet in Norway, and Sibelius Academy in Finland, in 1988, with Jorma Panula. He then spent the summer of 1989 at the Tanglewood Music Center Seminar of Conductors, studying with Seiji Ozawa, Gustav Meier, Simon Rattle, Marek Janowski and others.

Engeset has been Music Director of Tromsø Symphony Orchestra and The Norwegian Wind Ensemble, artistic director of Northern Norway's Northern Lights Festival and the Opera Nord, and permanent guest conductor of the Flemish Radio Orchestra. Since 2007 Engeset has been Chief Conductor and Artistic Director of Sweden’s DalaSinfonietta. He has toured widely, in Scandinavia, Britain, Germany, Belgium, the Czech Republic, Romania, Slovakia, Estonia and the United States. He has performed with many orchestras, including the Baltimore Symphony, Bergen Philharmonic, Bournemouth Symphony, Moscow Radio Symphony Orchestra, Malmø Symphony, NDR Philharmonic Orchestra, Washington NGA Symphony Orchestra, Oslo Philharmonic, Royal Scottish National Orchestra, St. Petersburg Philharmonic, and others.

Engeset has recorded several dozen CDs, for the Naxos, EMI, Klara and cpo labels. In particular, he has made many recordings of music by Scandinavian composers, such as Grieg, Sibelius and Tveitt.

== Honors ==
- 1996: Nordlysprisen

Awards
| Preceded by Bjørn Andor Drage | Recipient of the Nordlysprisen; 1996 | Succeeded by Arne Bjørhei |
