= Leif Ove Andsnes =

Norwegian pianist (born 1970)

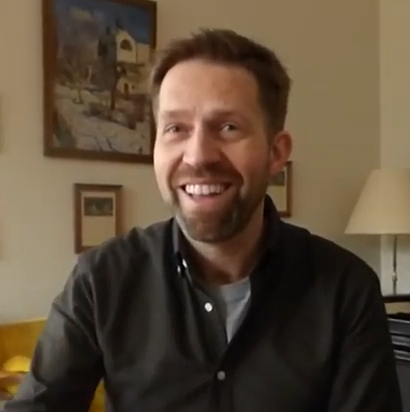
- Andsnes in 2017

Background information
- Born: 7 April 1970 (age 56); Karmøy Municipality, Rogaland, Norway
- Genres: Classical
- Occupation: Pianist
- Years active: 1987–present
- Website: leifoveandsnes.com

Leif Ove Andsnes (Norwegian pronunciation: [læɪf ˈûːvə ˈɑ̂nsneːs]; born 7 April 1970) is a Norwegian pianist and chamber musician. Andsnes has made several recordings for Virgin and EMI. In 2012, he signed with Sony Classical, and recorded for the label the "Beethoven Journey" project, which included the five piano concertos with the Mahler Chamber Orchestra. The works were recorded over three years, beginning with Nos. 1 and 3 in 2012, followed by Nos. 2 and 4 in 2013 and the Fifth Piano Concerto and Choral Fantasy in 2014. He is represented by IMG.

== Biography ==
Andsnes was born in Karmøy Municipality and studied with Jiří Hlinka at the Bergen Music Conservatory, making his debut in Oslo in 1987. He appeared at the Edinburgh Festival with the Oslo Philharmonic in 1989, and with the Cleveland Orchestra conducted by Neeme Järvi in 1990.

He is renowned as a champion of the works of Edvard Grieg. In 2002 he played Grieg's Piano Concerto at the Last Night of the Proms.

In November 2009, Pictures Reframed debuted at Lincoln Center's Alice Tully Hall, in which Andsnes performed Mussorgsky's suite accompanied by five hanging panels and a rear video projection by Robin Rhode. He has performed at Carnegie Hall, the Mostly Mozart Festival, and the Apple Store in New York City.

Andsnes cites Dinu Lipatti, Sviatoslav Richter, Arturo Benedetti Michelangeli, and Géza Anda among his idols.

He helped found the Risør Festival of Chamber Music in 1991 and was its artistic director until 2010. In June 2012, he served as music director of the 2012 Ojai Music Festival.

He is foreign member of the Royal Swedish Academy of Music.

== Awards ==
Andsnes has won many awards, including the Hindemith Prize Frankfurt (1987), Preis der Deutschen Schallplattenkritik (1997), Gilmore Artist Award (1998), Royal Philharmonic Society Music Awards (2000) and the Gramophone Classical Music Awards (eight times). He was inducted into the Gramophone Hall of Fame in 2013. His recording of Beethoven's Piano Concertos nos. 2 and 4 with the Mahler Chamber Orchestra won both the Concerto Award and the Recording of the Year Award from the BBC Music Magazine in 2015.

Andsnes also received the Gilmore Artist Award in 1998. He is one of only nine pianists to receive the award.

Andsnes has been nominated for a Grammy Award on eleven occasions.

== Personal life ==
Andsnes's partner is Norwegian horn player Ragnhild Lothe. They have three children.

== Discography ==
(For peak charting position on VG-lista, the Norwegian Albums chart, see NorwegianCharts.com page)

=== LP ===
- Chopin – Smetana – Beethoven: Sonatas etc. (1987) Vest-Norsk Plateselskap 0087-14

=== CD ===
- Nielsen: The Wind Chamber Music (1989) BIS-CD-428
- Prokofiev: Piano Concerto No. 3/Symphony No. 7 (1990) Simax PSC 1060
- Chopin/Schumann: Cello Sonata, Adagio & Allegro etc. (1990) Simax PSC 1063
- Chopin – Smetana – Beethoven: Sonatas etc. (1991) Vest-Norsk Plateselskap 0091-0023
- Grieg: Piano Concerto • Liszt: Piano Concerto No. 2 (1991) Virgin Classics 0777 7596132 4
- Janáček: Piano Sonata 1.X.1905 • In the Mists etc. (1991) Virgin Classics 0777 7596392 2
- Chopin: The Piano Sonatas (1992) Virgin Classics 0777 7590722 3
- Grieg: Piano Sonata/Lyric Pieces (1993) Virgin Classics 0777 7 59300 2 3
- Brahms/Schumann: Viola Sonatas, Märchenbilder (1993) Virgin Classics 0 777 7 59309 2 4
- Janáček • Debussy • Ravel • Nielsen: Violin Sonatas (1995) Virgin Classics 7243 5 45122 2 3
- Rachmaninov: Piano Concerto No. 3 (1995) Virgin Classics 7243 5 45173 2 7
- Nielsen: Piano Pieces (1996) Virgin Classics 7243 5 45129 2 6
- Schumann: Piano Sonata No. 1 • Fantasy (1997) EMI Classics 7243 5 56414 2 7
- The long, long winter night (1998) EMI Classics 7243 5 56541 2
- Brahms: Piano Concerto No. 1, etc. (1998) EMI Classics 7243 5 56583 2 6
- Szymanowski: Król Roger • Symphony No. 4 (1999) EMI Classics 7243 5 56823 2 1
- Rachmaninov: Songs (1999) EMI Classics 7243 5 56814 2 3
- Haydn: Piano Sonatas (1999) EMI Classics 7243 5 56756 2 0
- Britten • Shostakovich • Enescu (1999) EMI Classics 7243 5 56760 2 3
- Haydn: Piano Concertos Nos. 3, 4 & 11 (2000) EMI Classics 7243 5 56960 2 1
- Liszt: Piano Recital (2001) EMI Classics 7243 5 57002 2 3
- Grieg: Lyric Pieces (2002) EMI Classics 7243 5 57296 2 0
- Schubert: Piano Sonata, D. 959 • 4 Lieder (2002) EMI Classics 7243 5 57266 2 9
- Schubert: Piano Sonata, D. 850 • 9 Lieder (2003) EMI Classics 7243 5 57460 2 3
- Grieg • Schumann • Piano Concertos (2003) EMI Classics 7243 5 57486 2 1
- Dvořák: Violin Concerto • Piano Quintet (2003) EMI Classics 7243 5 57439 2 3
- Mozart: Piano Concertos 9 & 18 (2004) EMI Classics 7243 5 57803 2 4
- Schubert: Winterreise (2004) EMI Classics 7243 5 57790 2 1
- Bartók: Violin Sonatas (2004) EMI Records Ltd/Virgin Classics 7243 5 45668 2 0
- Bartók: The Piano Concertos (2005) Deutsche Grammophon 289 477 5330
- Schubert: Piano Sonata D960 • 3 Lieder (2005) EMI Classics 7243 5 57901 2 5
- Rachmaninov: Piano Concertos 1 & 2 (2005) EMI Classics 7243 4 74813 2 1
- Horizons (2006) EMI Classics 0946 3 41682 2 9
- Schubert: Piano Sonata D958 • Lieder • Fragments (2007) EMI Classics 0946 3 84321 2 8
- Ballad for Edvard Grieg (2007) EMI Classics 0946 3 94399 2 8 / EMI Classics 0946 3 94399 5 9 (Digital)
- Schumann • Brahms: Piano Quintets (2007) Virgin Classics 00946 395143 5 9 (Digital)
- Mozart: Piano Concertos 17 & 20 (2008) EMI Classics 50999 5 00281 2 2
- Schubert: Lieder (2008) EMI Classics 50999 5 16443 2 1
- Shadows Of Silence (2009) EMI Classics 5099926418223 / EMI Classics 5099926418254 (Digital)
- Mussorgsky: Pictures • Schumann: Kinderszenen (2009) EMI Classics 50999 6 98360 2 2
- Rachmaninov: Piano Concertos 3 & 4 (2010) EMI Classics 50999 6 40516 2 8
- Schumann: Complete works for Piano Trio (2011) EMI Classics 50999 0 94180 2 8
- The Beethoven Journey: Piano Concertos Nos. 1 & 3 (2012) Sony Classical 87254 20582
- The Beethoven Journey: Piano Concertos Nos. 2 & 4 (2014) Sony Classical 88837 05482
- The Beethoven Journey: Piano Concerto No. 5 • Choral Fantasy (2014) Sony Classical 88843 058862
- Sibelius (2017) Sony Classical 88985 408502

=== CD (miscellaneous) ===
- Movements (1993)

Andsnes/Antonsen/Mørk/Thorsen
EMI Norsk AS SKR 0001
Andsnes is represented with 5 piano pieces previously released on Virgin Classics 0777 7 59300 2 3 (1993)

- Andsnes, Antonsen, Mørk (1995)

EMI Classics 7243 5 55576 2 9
Andsnes is represented with miscellaneous piano pieces previously released on Virgin Classics 0777 7596132 4 (1991), Virgin Classics 0777 7596392 2 (1991) and Virgin Classics 0777 7590722 3 (1992)

- Grieg: Piano Concerto in A Minor – Symphony in C Minor (1995)

Bergen Philharmonic Orchestra/Dmitri Kitajenko
Edvard Grieg Museum • Trold 08
Andsnes is represented with Grieg's piano concerto, previously released on Virgin Classics 0777 7596132 4 (1991)

- Chopin for Dummies (1996)

Misc. pianists
EMI Classics 7243 5 66273 0 7
Andsnes is represented with Chopin's 'Mazurka In A Minor, Op. 17 Nr. 4', previously released on Virgin Classics 0777 7590722 3 (1992)

- Classical Sounds of Norway (1996)

Misc. artists
Bare Bra Musikk AS BBCD 2001
Andsnes is represented with the 1st movement of Grieg's piano concerto, previously released on Virgin Classics 0777 7596132 4 (1991)

- Delft Chamber Music Festival – Pettersson/Stravinsky/Schubert (1998)

Misc. artists
Koch Classics 3-1651-2
Andsnes is represented with Schubert's 'Nocturne in E-flat, D 897', previously unreleased

- En annen sol (2000)

Vamp
MajorStudio MSCD 1147
Andsnes plays together with singer Anne Grete Preus on the previously unreleased song 'En annen sol'

- Leif Ove Andsnes • A Portrait (2001)

Misc. artists
(2 CDs) EMI Classics 7243 5 74789 2 2
All works are previously released on EMI Classics

- Piano Nocturnes (2001)

Misc. pianists
(2 CDs) EMI Records Ltd/Virgin Classics 7243 5 61952 2 6
Andsnes is represented with previously released works on Virgin Classics 0777 7596392 2 (1991) and Virgin Classics 0777 7 59300 2 3 (1993)

- Grieg: Lyric Pieces (2002)

Edvard Grieg Museum • Trold 16
Relaunch of EMI Classics 7243 5 57296 2 0 (2002)

- Best of 2002 (2002)

Misc. artists
Classic fm CFMACD92
Andsnes is represented with Grieg's 'Wedding Day At Troldhaugen, Op. 65 Nr. 6', previously released on EMI Classics 7243 5 57296 2 0 (2002)

- Editor's Choice • The Top Ten Discs of July 2003 (2003)

Misc. artists
Gramophone GCD0703
Andsnes is represented with the 4th movement from Schubert's 'Piano sonata in D, D850', previously released on EMI Classics 7243 5 57509 2 1 (2003)

- Editor's Choice • The Top Ten Discs of September 2004 (2004)

Misc. artists
Gramophone GCD0904
Andsnes is represented with works previously released on EMI Records Ltd/Virgin Classics 7243 5 45668 2 0 (2004) and EMI Classics 7243 5 57790 2 1 (2004)

- Venn (2005)

Misc. Norwegian artists
(2CDs) Universal Music
Andsnes is represented with Geirr Tveitt's 'Welcome with honor', previously released on EMI Classics 7243 5 56542 2 9 (1998)

- Editor's Choice • The Top Ten Discs of November 2005 (2005)

Misc. artists
Gramophone GCD1105
Andsnes is represented with the 2nd movement of Rachmaninov's 'Piano Concerto No. 1', previously released on EMI Classics 7243 4 74813 2 1 (2005)

- Editor's Choice • The Top Ten Discs of August 2006 (2006)

Misc. artists
Gramophone GCD0806
Andsnes is represented with a conversation about Grieg, together with Rob Cowan, previously unreleased

=== Studio albums ===
- 2012: The Beethoven Journey – Piano Concertos Nos.1–5, Sony Classical
- 2014: Beethoven: Piano Concertos Nos.2 & 4, Sony Classical
- 2014: The Beethoven Journey – Piano Concerto No.5 "Emperor" & Choral Fantasy, Sony Classical
- 2017: Sibelius, Sony Classical
- 2018: Chopin, Sony Classical
- 2021: Mozart Momentum – 1785, Sony Classical
- 2022: Mozart Momentum – 1786, Sony Classical

=== DVD ===
- The Verbier Festival & Academy 10th Anniversary Piano Extravaganza (2004)

Misc. pianists
RCA Red Seal

- Leif Ove Andsnes plays Bach & Mozart (2005)

Norwegian Chamber Orchestra
EMI Classics 0946 3 10436 9 7

== Filmography ==
- Concerto: A Beethoven Journey (2015) as himself

== Biography ==
- Leif Ove Andsnes: I og med musikken (2005)

Written by Astrid Kvalbein
Released by Det Norske Samlaget, ISBN 82-521-6526-5
