= List of Norwegian women photographers =

This is a list of women photographers who were born in Norway or whose works are closely associated with that country.

== A ==
- Louise Abel (1841–1907), German-born photographer, together with her husband Hans Abel opened a studio in Oslo in 1864

== B ==
- Bolette Berg (1872–1944), studio portrait photographer
- Hulda Marie Bentzen (1858–1930), professional photographer, established studios in Bergen and Voss
- Marie Magdalene Bull (1827–1907), actress and photographer

== C ==
- Catherine Cameron (born 1962), artistic photographer

== F ==
- Karoline Frogner (born 1961), filmmaker, photographer, writer, educator
- Mimi Frellsen (1830–1914), pioneering female photographer in Oslo

== G ==
- Anne Helene Gjelstad (born 1956), photographer, fashion designer

== H ==
- Elisabeth Helmer (1854 – after 1912), professional photographer in Grimstad
- Marie Høeg (1866–1949), photographer, suffragist
- Tina Signesdottir Hult (born 1982), portrait photographer

== K ==
- Anne Krafft (born 1957), painter, ceramist, photographer

== L ==
- Kristin Lodoen Linder (born 1966), photographer, visual artist, dancer, choreographer
- Marthine Lund (c. 1817 – 1870), early female photographer, studio in Christiania from 1865
- Solveig Lund (1868 – 1943), had studios in Moss, Christiania and worked in Bergen, work focused on women wearing bunad (traditional Norwegian dress) and bridal crowns.

== M ==
- Elisabeth Meyer (1899–1968), photographer, journalist
- Mimsy Møller (born 1955), press photographer
- Hanneli Mustaparta (born 1982), photographer, fashion blogger, former model

== N ==
- Agnes Nyblin (1869–1945), professional photographer, ran a studio in Bergen

== S ==
- Johanna Ullricka Bergstrøm Skagen (1839–1882), Swedish-born Norwegian professional photographer
- Augusta Solberg (1856–1922), professional photographer, studio in Bergen

== T ==
- Vibeke Tandberg (born 1967)

== See also ==
- List of women photographers
