= Hulda Marie Bentzen =

Norwegian photographer (1858–1930)

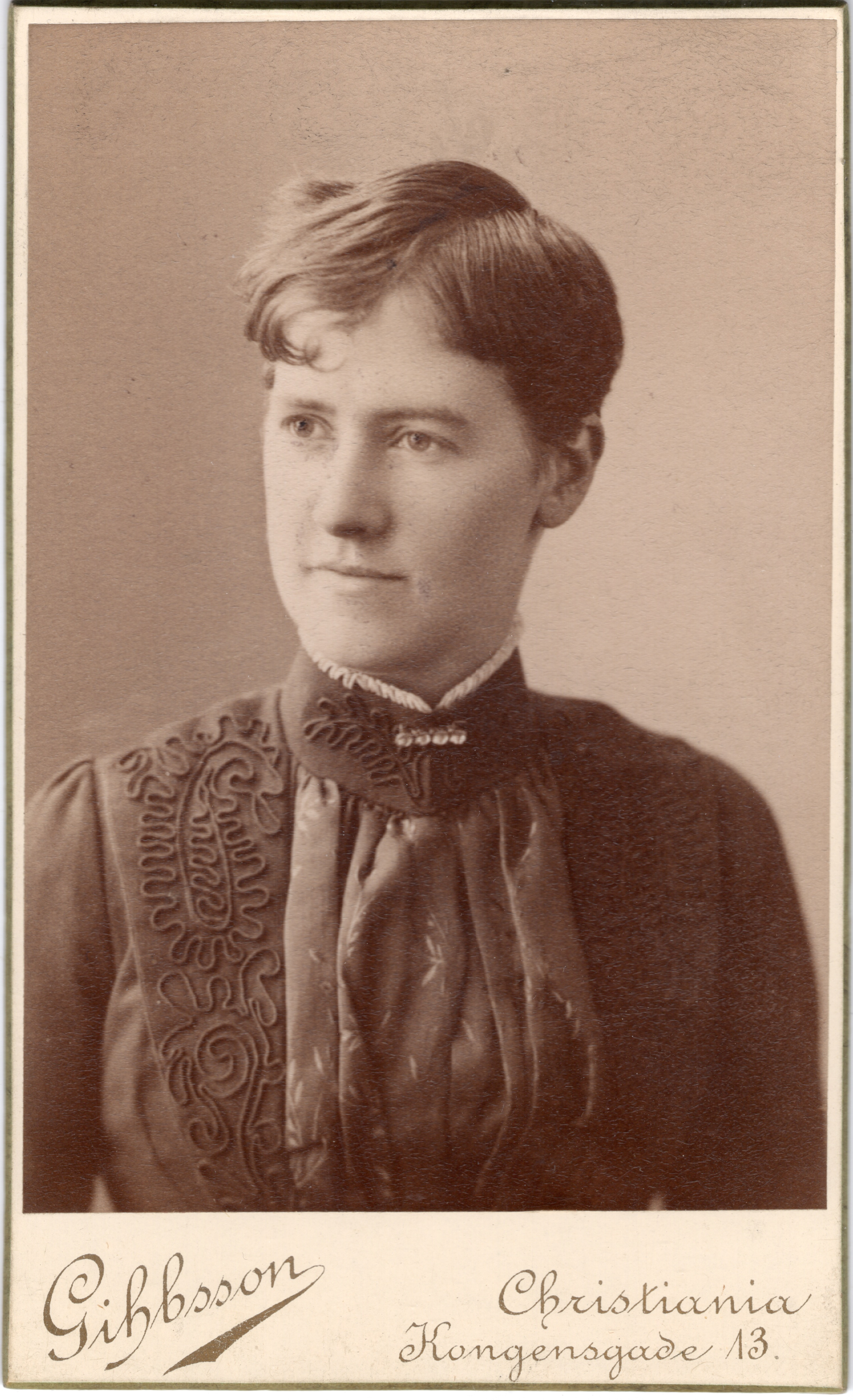
Hulda Marie Bentzen, around 1890.

Hulda Marie Bentzen (1858–1930) was an early professional female Norwegian photographer who established studios in Bergen and Voss.

== Life ==
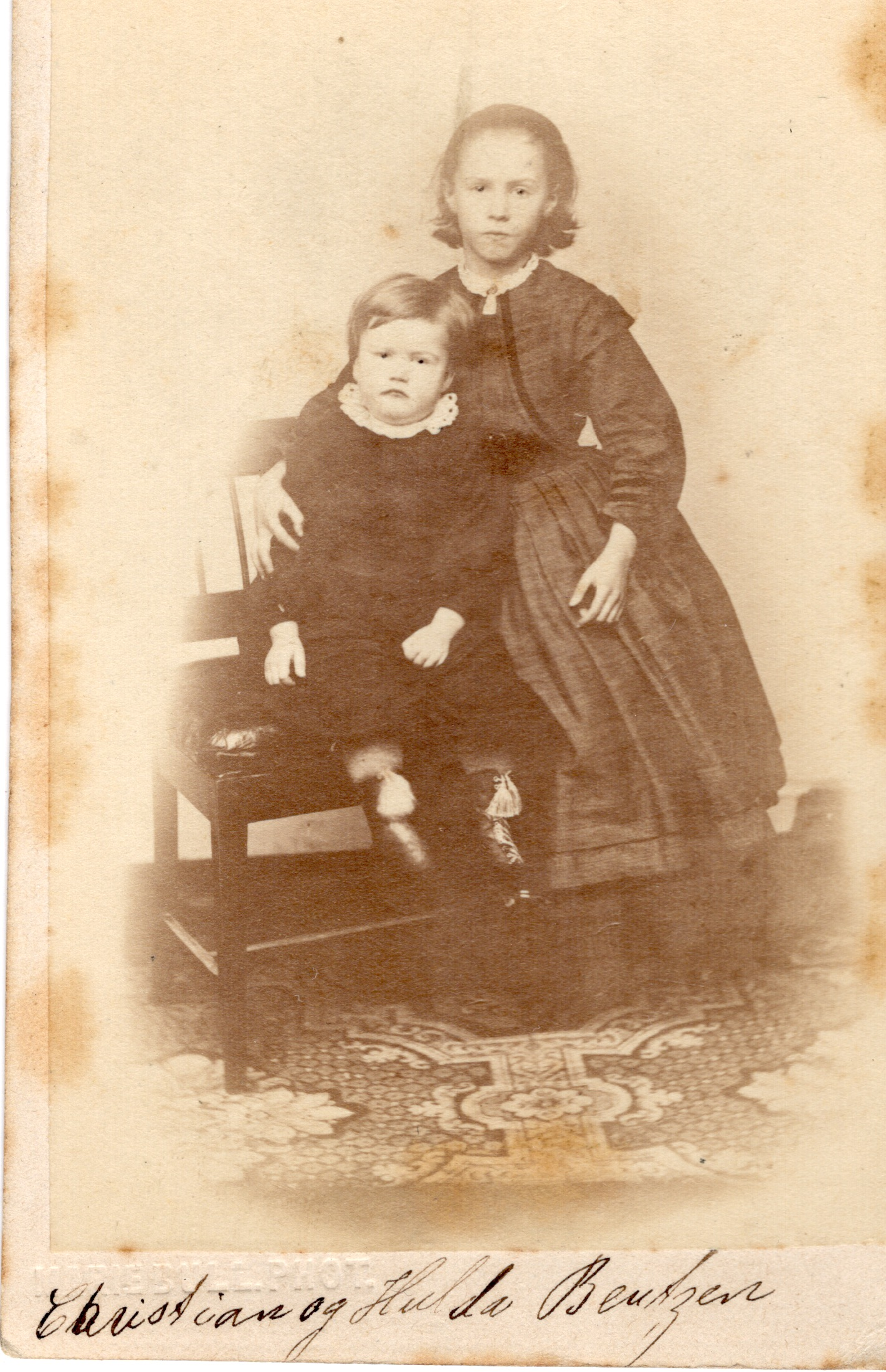
Hulda and her brother Christian as children. Photo taken by Marie Magdalene Bull.

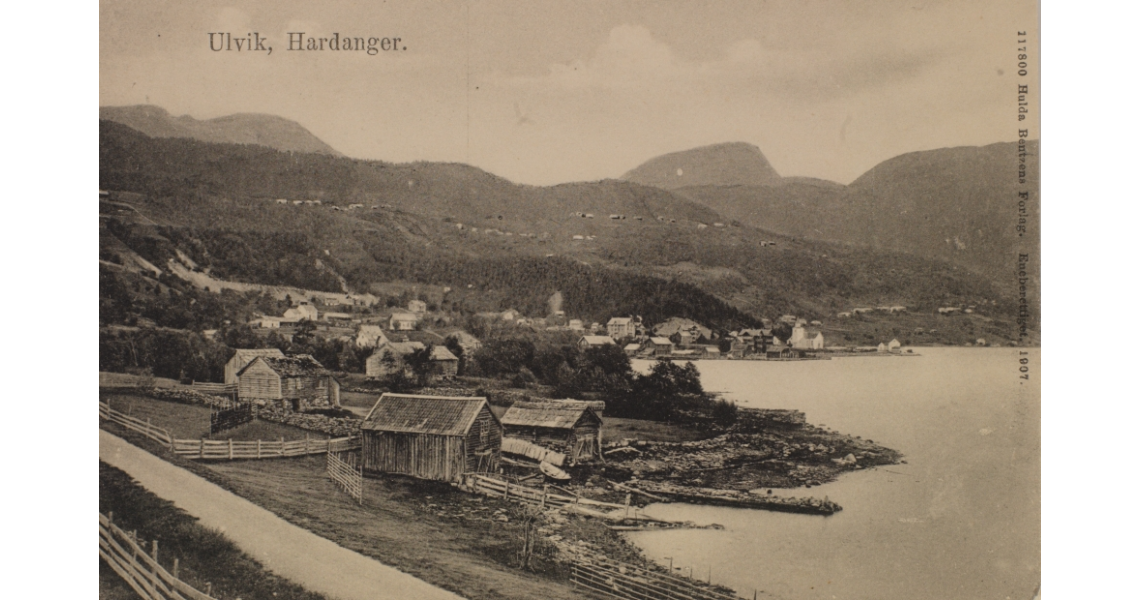
A 1907 postcard of Ulvik by Bentzen

Born on 18 December 1858 in Bergen, Bentzen was the daughter of the sea captain Einar Bentzen (1824–1876) and Karen Bertine Gullaksen. After learning photography under Max Behrends (1839–1903), she opened a business in Bergen in 1886. The firm appears to have been taken over by Justus Lockwood in the early 1900s when she opened a business in Voss. In 1918, she put the business up for sale but continued to reproduce old works until much later. She also created postcards. Bentzen received a medal at the Bergen Exhibition in 1898.

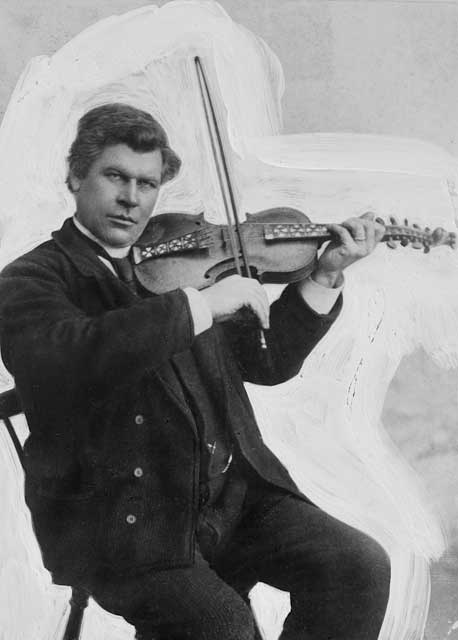
Sjur Helgeland - violinist and composer

Bentzen was one of several women who established early photographic studios in Norway. The Encyclopedia of nineteenth-century photography are disparaging about many of these but they pick out several of note including Marie Høeg in Horten, Louise Abel in Christiania, Louise Wold in Holmestrand, Augusta Solberg in Lillehammer and Bentzen and Agnes Nyblin in Bergen.
