= Iver Holter =

Norwegian composer (1850–1941)

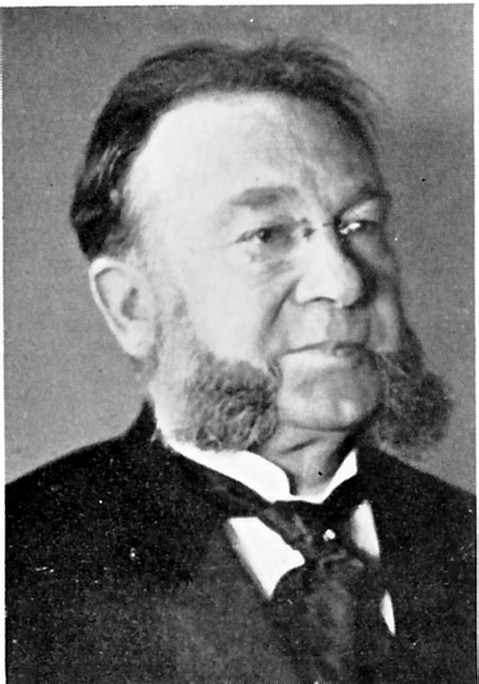
- Born: Iver Paul Fredrik Holter; 13 December 1850
- Died: 27 January 1941 (aged 90)
- Era: Romantic

Iver Paul Fredrik Holter (13 December 1850 – 27 January 1941) was a Norwegian composer. He was conductor and music director of the Oslo Philharmonic for a quarter century.

== Biography ==
Iver Paul Fredrik Holter was born in Gausdal Municipality in Oppland county, Norway. His parents were Caspar Georg Holter (1812–1880), a minister, and Caroline Theodora Børresen (1818–1857). He spent his adolescence at Gjerpen Municipality near the town of Skien, where he received violin lessons from the German-born organist Friederich Wilhelm Rojahn (1820-1886). Holter had originally studied medicine but by 1876, he changed career paths to become a musician. He first studied music with Johan Svendsen and afterward in Leipzig (1876–79). He continued his music studies in Berlin (1879–1881).

In the autumn of 1882, he followed Edvard Grieg as conductor for the Bergen Philharmonic Orchestra. In autumn 1886, he became music director and conductor of the Oslo Philharmonic, a position he held for 25 years. Holter suggested the founding of a city orchestra which could play at municipal festivities, concerts and in the theatre, and as a result of this, the orchestra gained municipal support from 1889.

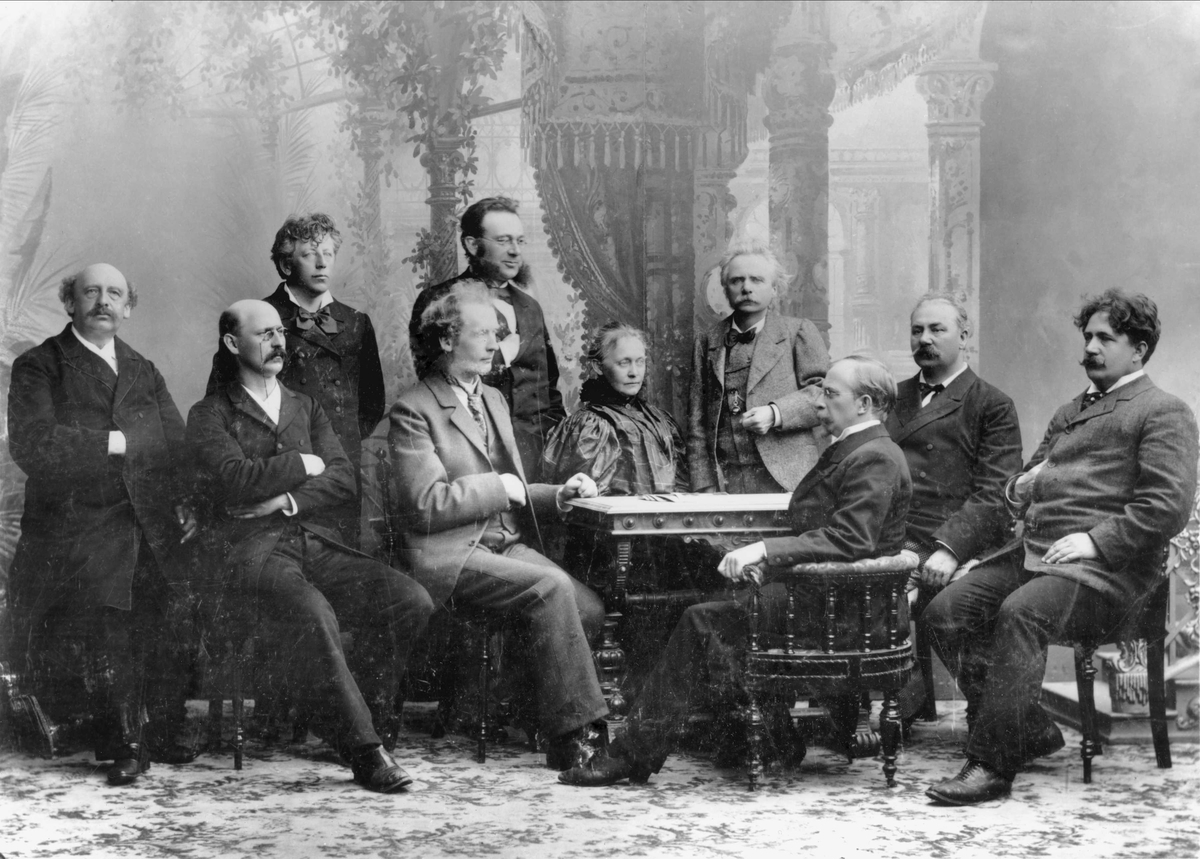
1898 Music festival in Bergen by Agnes Nyblin. Left to right: Christian Cappelen, Catharinus Elling, Ole Olsen, Gerhard Rosenkrone Schelderup, Holter, Agathe Backer Grøndahl, Edvard Grieg, Christian Sinding, Johan Svendsen and Johan Halvorsen

Holter became a central figure in the city's musical life. In 1890 he founded the Oslo Bys Orchestra, and he was conductor for the Music Association (Musikkforeningen) in Oslo for a quarter century. During the period 1900 to 1906 he edited the music magazine, Nordisk Musik-Revue. In 1912, he was one of the founders Norwegian Musical Artists' Society (Norsk Tonekunstnersamfund).

Holter composed piano music, songs and choral music, including a series of cantatas for various major and minor events. As a composer, he followed the classic-romantic ideals. His numerous compositions include a symphony, string quartets, a violin concerto, cantatas, songs and choral pieces. Most notably, he wrote music for Goethe's Götz von Berlichingen and the orchestral work St. Hans Kveld.

He was buried in Vår Frelsers gravlund in Oslo, Norway.

== Selected works ==
- Bagatellen für das Pianoforte. 1879
- 2 String Quartets. 1880, ?
- Vier Gesänge für eine mittlere Stimme mit Begleitung des Pianoforte. 1881
- Til Fædrelandet (cantata, text by T. Caspari). 1895
- Kantate ved den 7de store Sangerfest (text by M. Rolfsen). 1896
- Nürnberg (cantata, text by T. Caspari). 1898
- Kantate ved indvielsen af Kristiania handelsstands forenings nye hus (text by C. Dysthe). 1912
- Kristiania-Kantate (text by T. Caspari). 1924
- Olavskantate (text by T. Caspari). 1930
- Violin Concerto in A minor. 1920
- Symphony in F major
