= Johan Svendsen =

Norwegian composer, conductor and violinist (1840-1911)

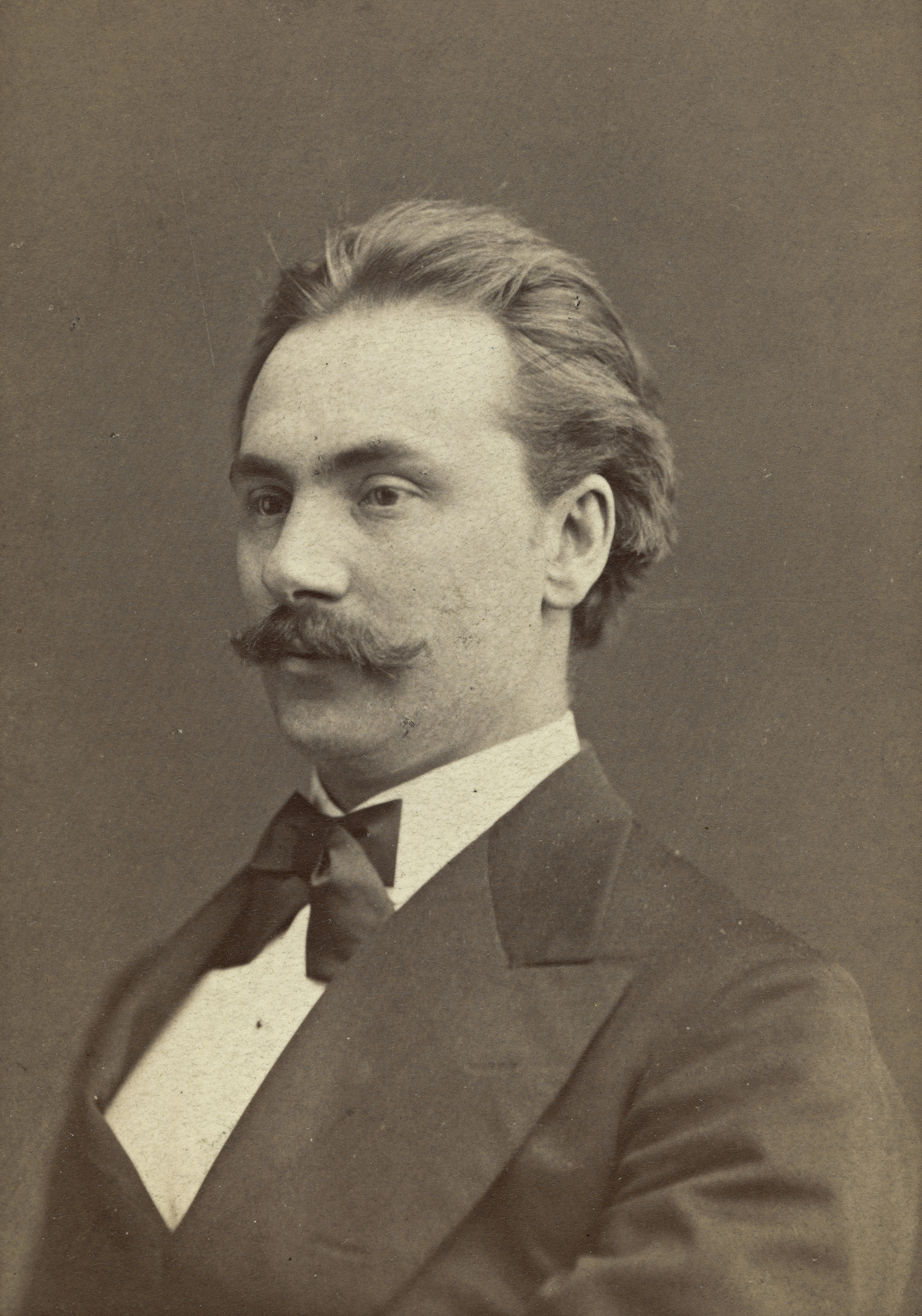
- Born: 30 September 1840; Christiania, Norway
- Died: 14 June 1911 (aged 70); Copenhagen, Denmark
- Occupations: composer, conductor, violinist

Johan Severin Svendsen (30 September 1840 – 14 June 1911) was a Norwegian composer, conductor and violinist. Born in Christiania (now Oslo), Norway, he lived most of his life in Copenhagen, Denmark.

Svendsen's output includes two symphonies, a violin concerto, a cello concerto, and the Romance for violin, as well as a number of Norwegian Rhapsodies for orchestra. At one time Svendsen was an intimate friend of the German composer Richard Wagner and Icelandic composer Sveinbjörn Sveinbjörnsson.

== Life ==
Svendsen's father was a music teacher and military bandmaster, who taught him both the violin and clarinet. He began playing in orchestras at age nine when he learned violin, and began composing by age eleven. At fifteen he enlisted in the military band at Akershus Fortress, playing clarinet, flute, trombone, and percussion among other instruments. By the time he finished school, he was working as an orchestral musician, and occasionally made short concert tours as a violinist. In Lübeck, on one of his tours, he came to the attention of a wealthy merchant who made it possible for him to study from 1863 to 1867 at the Leipzig Conservatory. He began his studies with Ferdinand David, but problems with his hand forced him to switch to composition, which he studied with Carl Reinecke. He completed his studies in Leipzig in 1867, receiving first prize in composition. During this period, Svendsen had a son out of wedlock, Johann Richard Rudolph (1867–1933).

Gradually his attention turned to conducting. After spending time in Paris (1868–70) and Leipzig (1870–72), he returned to Christiania. One of his students in Christiania was pianist Bertha Tapper. In the summer of 1871, he went to New York City to marry Sarah (Sally, later changed to Bergljot) Levett Schmidt, whom he had met in Paris. He was conductor of the Musical Society Concerts in Christiania (1872–77), then spent three years in Germany, Italy, England and France. He returned to teach and conduct in Kristiania (1880–1883). In 1883, he was appointed principal conductor of the Royal Theater Orchestra in Copenhagen, where he lived until his death.

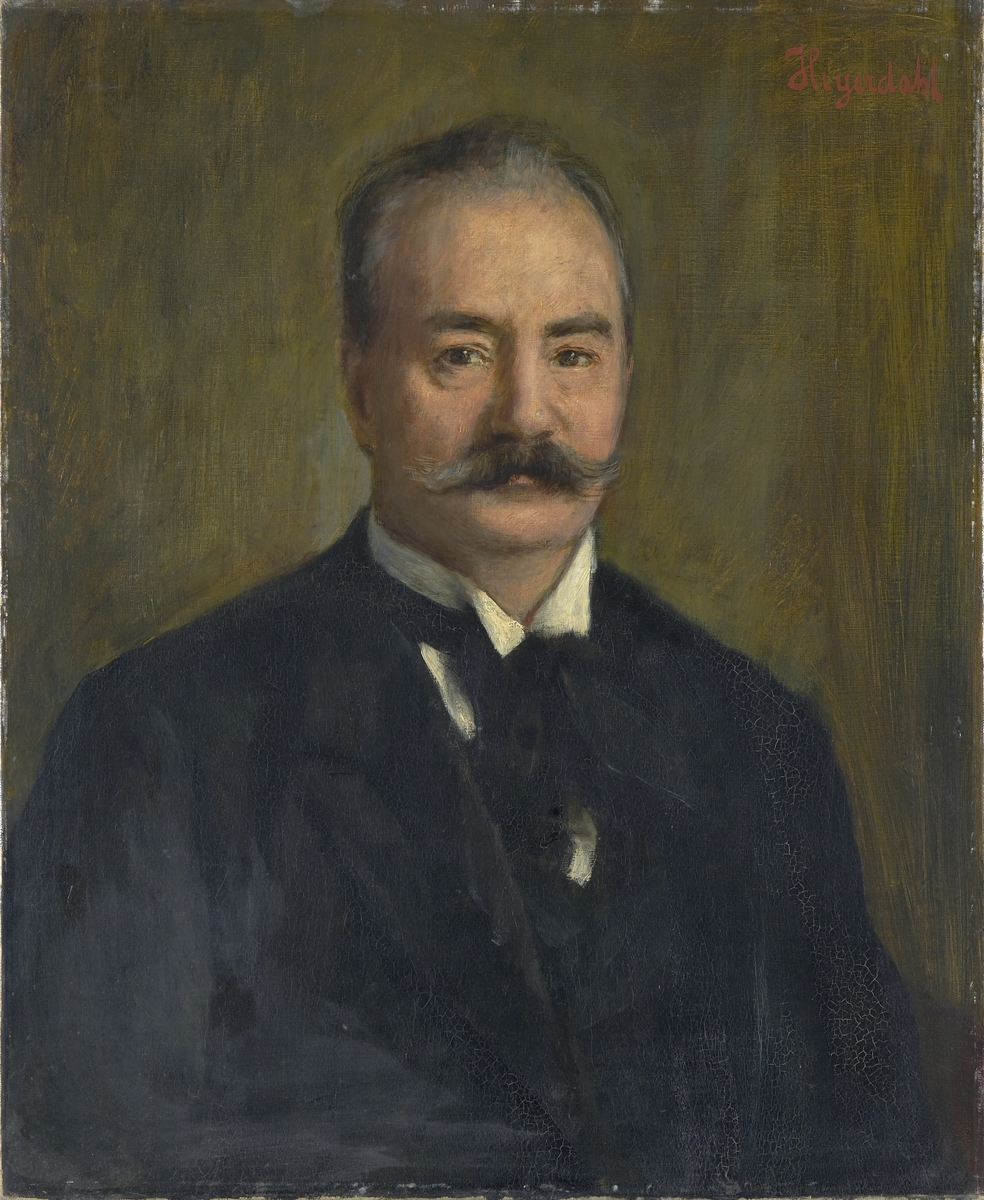
Johan Svendsen, c.1890; portrait by Hans Heyerdahl.

In 1884, he and his wife separated, and she moved to Paris. Their relationship had been chaotic for several years. A famous anecdote would have it that in 1883, in a fit of anger, she had thrown the only copy of his Symphony No. 3 in the fire. This incident was used by Henrik Ibsen in Hedda Gabler. If anything was caught up in the fire at all, it is rather unlikely it was anything near a complete symphony. However, some sketches, most likely for a symphony, were found by conductor Bjarte Engeset in 2007. They were elaborated and orchestrated by Bjørn Morten Christophersen and premiered by the Bergen Philharmonic Orchestra and Engeset in 2011.

Following a divorce from Sarah (10 December 1901), he married (23 December 1901) Juliette Haase, with whom he had been living and had three children. His younger son from this marriage was the famous Danish actor Eyvind Johan-Svendsen (1896–1946).

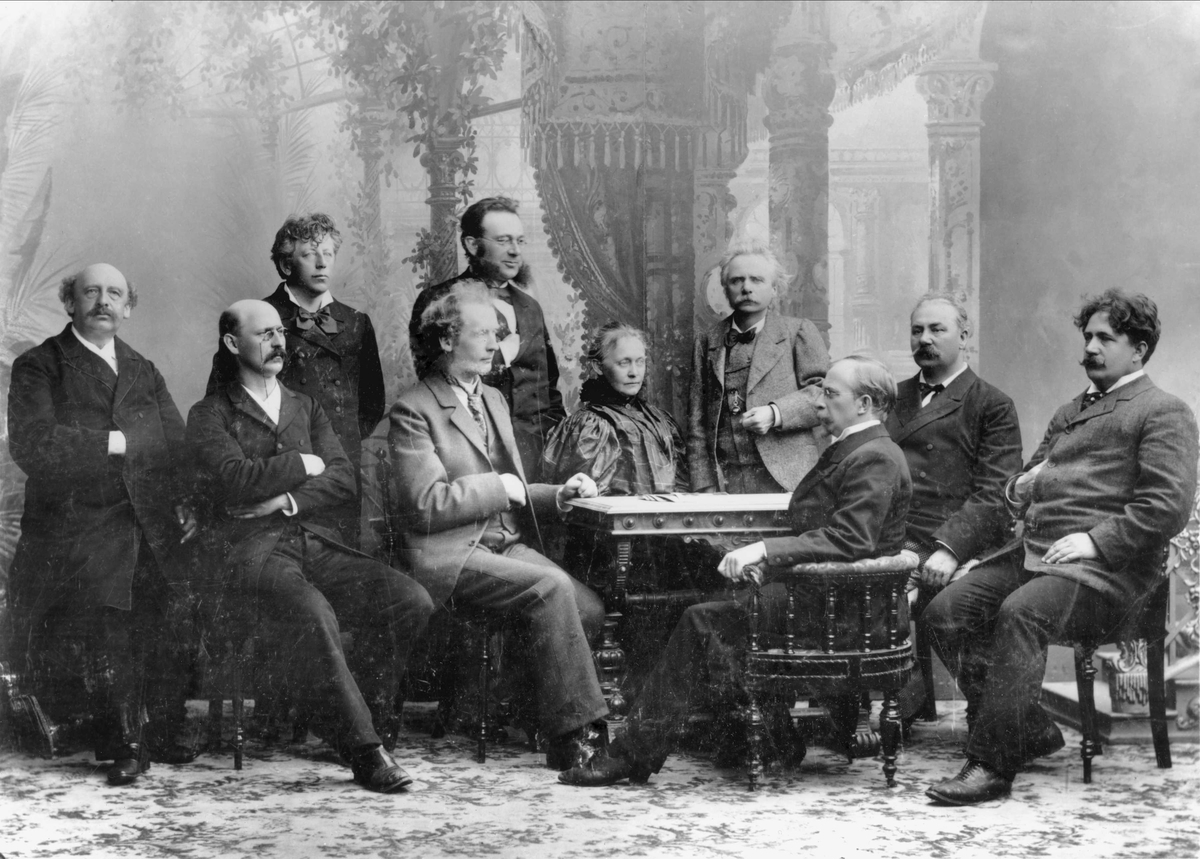
1898 Music festival in Bergen by Agnes Nyblin. Left to right: Christian Cappelen, Catharinus Elling, Ole Olsen, Gerhard Rosenkrone Schelderup, Iver Holter, Agathe Backer Grøndahl, Edvard Grieg, Christian Sinding, Svendsen and Johan Halvorsen

In stark contrast to his more famous contemporary and close friend, Edvard Grieg, Svendsen was famous for his skill of orchestration rather than that of harmonic value. While Grieg composed mostly for small instrumentation, Svendsen composed primarily for orchestras and large ensembles. His most famous work is his Romance for violin and orchestra, Op. 26. He was very popular in Denmark and Norway during his lifetime, both as a composer and a conductor, winning many national awards and honors. However this popularity did not translate into acceptance into the international repertory of classical music. He died in Copenhagen, aged 70.

Svendsen's first published work, the String Quartet in A minor, Op. 1, achieved great popular success. He quickly followed with the String Octet, Op. 3 and String Quintet, Op. 5, both of which added to his early fame. All of Svendsen's chamber music was written while he was at the Leipzig Conservatory, yet these works are not considered student works. By general consensus, Svendsen was regarded as one of the most talented students then at the Conservatory. His works won prizes and received public performances to much acclaim.

== Works ==
In parentheses, composition years and premiere place and date

Orchestra

- Symphony No. 1 in D major, Op. 4 (1865–67; Christiania, 12 October 1867)
- Violin Concerto, Op. 6 (1868–70; Leipzig, 6 February 1872)
- Cello Concerto, Op. 7 (1870; Leipzig, 16 March 1871)
- Sigurd Slembe, Symphonic Prelude, Op. 8 (1871; Leipzig, 12 December 1871)
- Carnival in Paris, Episode, Op. 9 (1872; Christiania, 26 October 1872)
- Funeral March, On the Death of King Carl XV, Op. 10 (1872; 26 October 1872)
- Zorahayda, Legend, Op. 11 (1874, rev. 1879; Christiania, 3 October 1874, rev. 11 May 1880)
- Festival Polonaise, Op. 12 (1873; Christiana, 6 August 1873)
- Coronation March (for the Coronation of King Oscar II), Op. 13 (1873; Trondheim, 18 July 1873)
- Norwegian Artists' Carnival, Op. 14 (1874; Christiania, 17 March 1874)
- Symphony No. 2 in B-flat major, Op. 15 (1874; Christiania, 14 October 1876)
- Norwegian Rhapsody No. 1, Op. 17 (1876; Kristiania, 25 September 1877)
- Romeo and Juliet, Fantasia, Op. 18 (1876; Christiania, 14 October 1876)
- Norwegian Rhapsody No. 2, Op. 19 (1876; ??)
- Norwegian Rhapsody No. 3, Op. 21 (1876; Paris, January ??, 1879)
- Norwegian Rhapsody No. 4, Op. 22 (1877; Paris, 1 February 1879)
- Violin Romance, Op. 26 (1881; Kristiania, 30 October 1881; the soloist was Stanisław Barcewicz)
- Polonaise, Op. 28 (1882)
- Andante Funebre (1895)

String Orchestra

- 2 Swedish Folk Melodies, Op. 27 (1876, 1878)
- 2 Icelandic Melodies, Op. 30 (1874)
- Ifjol gjætt' e gjeitinn (Last year I was tending the goats), Op. 31 (1874)

Chamber

- String Quartet, Op. 1 (1865)
- String Octet, Op. 3 (1866)
- String Quintet, Op. 5 (1867)
- Humorous March, Op. 16 (1874)

Vocal

- 2 Songs (Male Chorus), Op. 2 (1865)
- 5 Songs (Voice and Piano), Op. 23 (1879)
- 4 Songs (Voice and Piano), Op. 24 (1879)
- 2 Songs (Voice and Piano), Op. 25 (1878, 1880)
- Wedding Cantata (for Prince Oscar Gustav Adolph and Princess Sophia Maria Victoria), Op. 29 (1881; Kristiania, October 18, 1881)
- Hymn (for golden wedding anniversary of King Christian IX and Queen Louise), Op. 32 (1892)

Ballet

- Foraaret kommer (The Arrival of Spring), Op. 33 (1892; Copenhagen, May 26, 1892)

About 50 other minor works, not included in his numbered catalog.

== Documents ==
Letters by Johan Svendsen held by the State Archives in Leipzig, company archives of the Music Publishing House C.F.Peters (Leipzig).

== Notes ==
Preceded by Holger Simon Paulli	Principal Conductors, Royal Danish Orchestra; 1883–1908	Succeeded by Frederik Rung
