= Mon Schjelderup =

Norwegian composer and pianist

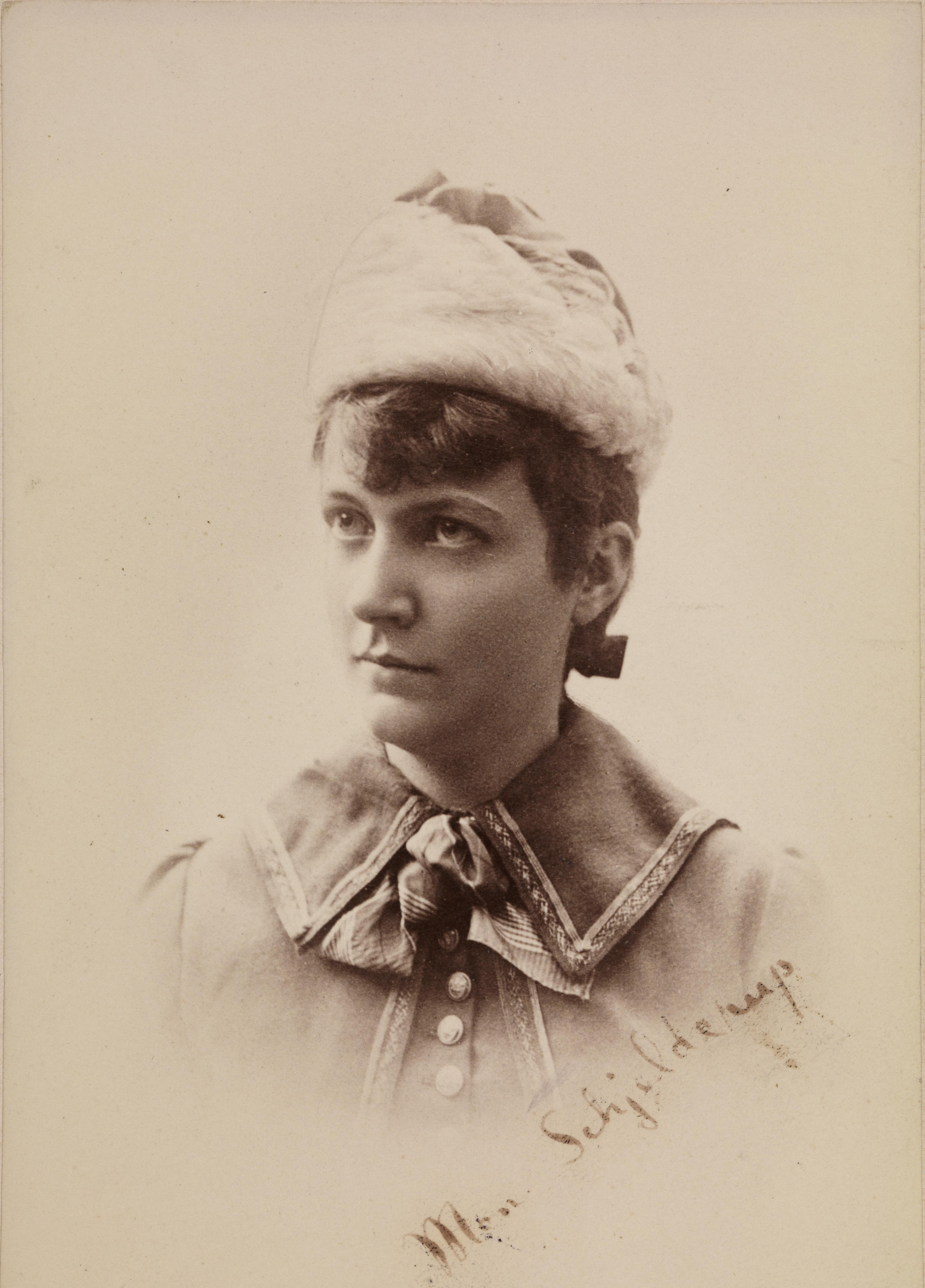
Mon Schjelderup

Mon Schjelderup (16 June 1870 – 21 November 1934) was a Norwegian composer and pianist.

== Biography ==
Maria Gustava Schjelderup was born in Fredrikshald (now Halden), Østfold, of parents Captain Christian Bernhard Koren Schjelderup (1819–1889) and Anne Sofie Preus Berg (1831–1898). She was also the cousin of composer Gerhard Schjelderup (1859–1933).

Schjelderup grew up in a musical home, and wrote her first composition at age 14. She studied piano with Agathe Backer Grøndahl. Later she continued her studies in piano and theory at the Royal Music Institute of Berlin, and in composition at the Conservatory in Paris with Jules Massenet. In 1894 she made her public debut as pianist and composer in Christiania. She continued her study with Massenet and began working as a composer and a piano teacher at the Music Conservatory in Christiania.

Mon Schjelderup never married and retired at the age of 34 due to disabling mental illness. She died in 1934 in Asker, Akershus.

== Works ==
Schjelderup composed about forty songs, piano pieces, violin pieces, a sonata for violin and piano and orchestral works. Selected compositions include:

For Orchestra:

- Prelude to 5 Act II of The Wild Duck by Henrik Ibsen
- Fest March, Op. 30, 1900 (arranged for orchestra by Jules Massenet)
- For Violin and Piano: Berceuse, Op. 1, 1893
- Ballade, Op. 2
- 2 Romances, Op. 6, 1894
- Sonata in B minor, Op. 12, 1896

For cello and piano:

- Tungsind, op. 18, 1899

For voice and piano:

- 2 Songs, Op. 10, 1899 (text W. Krag)
- 2 West View, op. 16, 1899 (text W. Krag)
- Huldre Song, Op. 21, 1899 (text A. Garborg)
- Nocturne, Scherzo, Op. 23, 1900 (text V. Krag)
- Birch trees in Bridal Veil, op. 24 (text T. Caspari)
- Jokes Mother To view and Fish Cutting, op. 33, 1902 (text A. Winge)
- A loss, Op. 33, 1902 (text H. Christensen)
- Poppy red, Op. 48, 1905 (text F. Docker-Smith)
- Maria Nøklebånd, op. 61 (text F. Docker-Smith)
- My love no soul on earth to be wide, Op. 63 (text S. Lagerlöf)
- My Beloved dancer in Sale, op. 64(text L.C. Nielsen)
- Nursery Rhymes, 1902
- Songs (text W. Krag)

For piano:

- Au Printemps
- 3 Morceaux, Op. 3
- 2 Piano Pieces, Op. 13, 1898 (lullaby, Song without Words)
- Trifles, 4 light piano pieces, 1903
