= Catharinus Elling =

Norwegian musician, composer, musicologist, and music educator

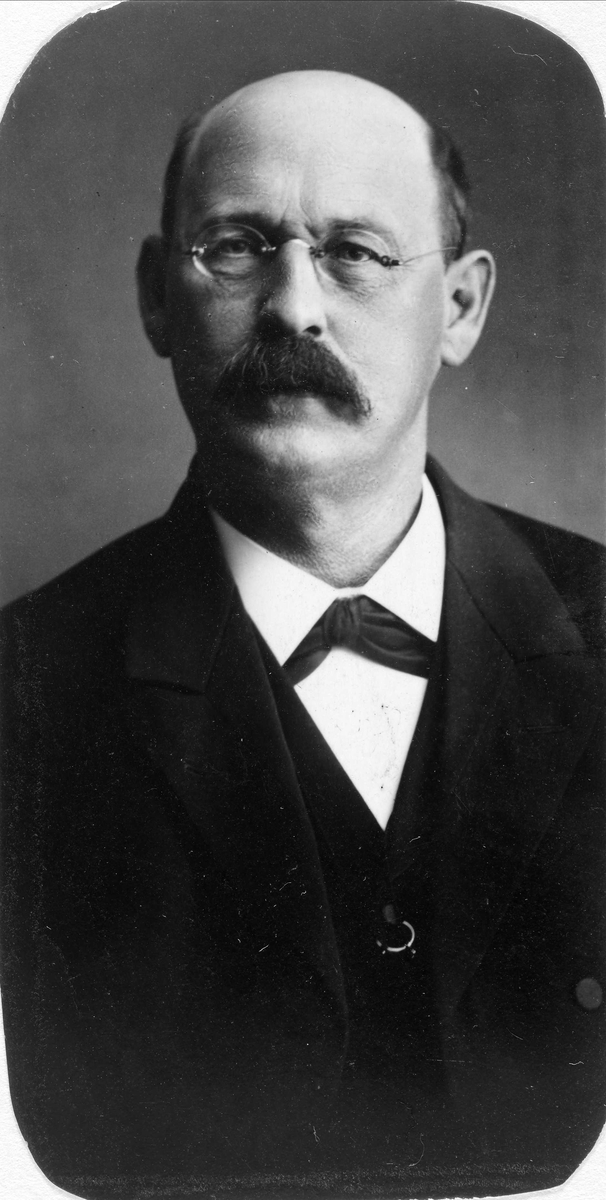
Catharinus Elling ca. 1925

Catharinus Elling (13 September 1858 – 8 January 1942) was a Norwegian music teacher, organist, music critic, and composer. He was also a folk music collector and the author of a number of books.

== Biography ==
Elling was born in Christiania (now Oslo), Norway. He was the son of Andreas Schaft Elling (1818–1872) and Pauline Bangsboe (1826–1905). His brother was engineer Ægidius Elling (1861–1949).

He studied piano and composition in Leipzig from 1877 to 1878. In 1886 he received a scholarship and studied music at Professor Heinrich von Herzogenberg at Hochschule für Musik in Berlin from 1886 to 1887. From 1896 to 1908, he was teacher at Oslo Conservatory of Music. He was also organist at Gamlebyen Church in Kristiania from (1908–26). He was also music critic at Dagbladet (1881–82), Ny Illustreret Tidende (1884–86) and Morgenposten (1903–07). Additionally he also acted as conductor of Drammens sangforening (1897–1901).

As a composer, he wrote symphonies, a violin concerto, chamber music, an opera, and more than 200 songs, most in the 1890–1905 period. His works are seldom performed now, but many musicians were influenced by him, such as Fartein Valen, who studied music under Elling.

Elling is principally known for his extensive work on collecting and recording Norwegian folk music. Elling was named a Government scholar in 1899. He continued a folk music collection across many rural parts of the country: Trøndelag, Gudbrandsdalen, Oppland, Telemark, Setesdal, Valdres and Sunnfjord. At the same time, folk music collector Olav Sande (1850–1927) was also named to a state stipend, and the two divided the country between them; Sande taking the music tradition from Sogn to Vest-Agder. Elling's mandate was to collect music and also work to preserve it. He published a range of music books with titles such as Norske folkemelodier for klaver, Norske folkeviser for sang og klaver and Slåtter for fiolin og klaver. Both at the time, and since, he has been criticised for wanting to rearrange folk music to fit with classical music's style.

== Selected compositions ==
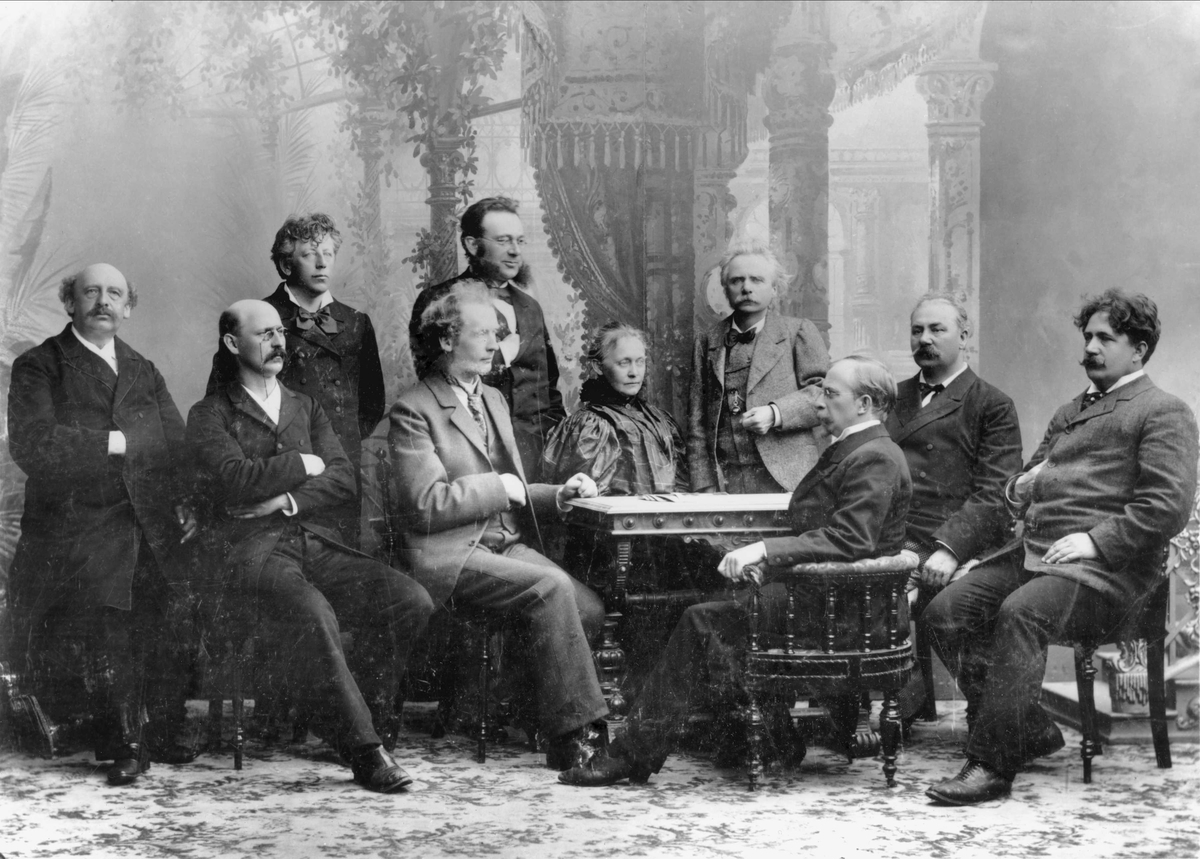
1898 Music festival in Bergen by Agnes Nyblin. Left to right: Christian Cappelen, Elling, Ole Olsen, Gerhard Rosenkrone Schelderup, Iver Holter, Agathe Backer Grøndahl, Edvard Grieg, Christian Sinding, Johan Svendsen and Johan Halvorsen

=== Opera ===
- Kosakkerne (The Cossacks, 1890–94)

=== Symphonies ===
- Symphony No. 1 in A major (1890)
  1. Allegro con brio
  2. Andante
  3. Presto
  4. Allegro assai e risoluto
- Symphony No. 2 in A minor (1897)
  1. Allegro
  2. Andante
  3. Vivace
  4. Finale: allegro

=== Orchestral ===
- Musikalske diktninger for String Orchestra, Oboe and two Horns (1878)
- Nordic suite (1903–04)
- Theme and Variations for Orchestra (1897)
- Violin Concerto in D minor (1918)
  1. Allegro
  2. Andante
  3. Allegro vivace

=== Chamber music ===
- Piano Trio in D major (1885)
- Violin Sonata in D major (1894)
- String Quartet in D major (1897)

=== Choral music ===
- Evig for Choir, on a text by Jens Peter Jacobsen (1892)
- Den forlorne søn, Oratorio (The Prodigal Son, 1895–96)
- Kong Inge og Gregorius Dagsøn for Tenor, Men's Choir and Orchestra on a Text by Bjørnstjerne Bjørnson (King Inge and Gregorius Dagsøn, 1898)
- Cantata for mixed choir and Orchester on a text by Jacob B. Bull (1899)

== Writings ==
- Vore folkemelodier (Our Folk Melodies, 1909)
- Vore kjæmpeviser (Our Battle Songs, 1914)
- Vore slåtter (Our Hymns, 1915)
- Tonefølelse (Sense of Tone, 1920)
- Norsk folkemusikk (Norwegian Folk Music, 1922)
- Strøbemerkninger til vor musikhistorie (Various Remarks on our Musical History, 1925)
- Vore religiøse folketoner (Our Religious Folk Songs, 1927)
- Sprogforholdet inden vore folkemelodier (The language relationship within our folk melodies, 1930)
- Nye bidrag til belysning af norsk folkemusik (New Contributions to the Explanation of Norwegian Folk Music, 1933)

== Selected books ==
- Vore folkemelodier, 1909
- Norsk folkemusikk, 1922
- Sprogforholdet inden vore folkemelodier, 1930
- Nye bidrag til belysning af norsk folkemusik, 1933
- Religiøse folketoner for blandet kor, 1904–19
- Religiøse folketoner for sang og klaver, 1907–18
- Norske folkeviser for sang og klaver, 1908–25
- Norske folkemelodier for klaver, 1911

== Other sources ==
- Finn Benestad, Nils Grinde, Harald Herresthal (1999) Norges musikkhistorie: romantikk og gullalder. 1870–1910. (Oslo: Aschehoug) ISBN 9788203224058
