= Christian Cappelen =

Norwegian organist and composer

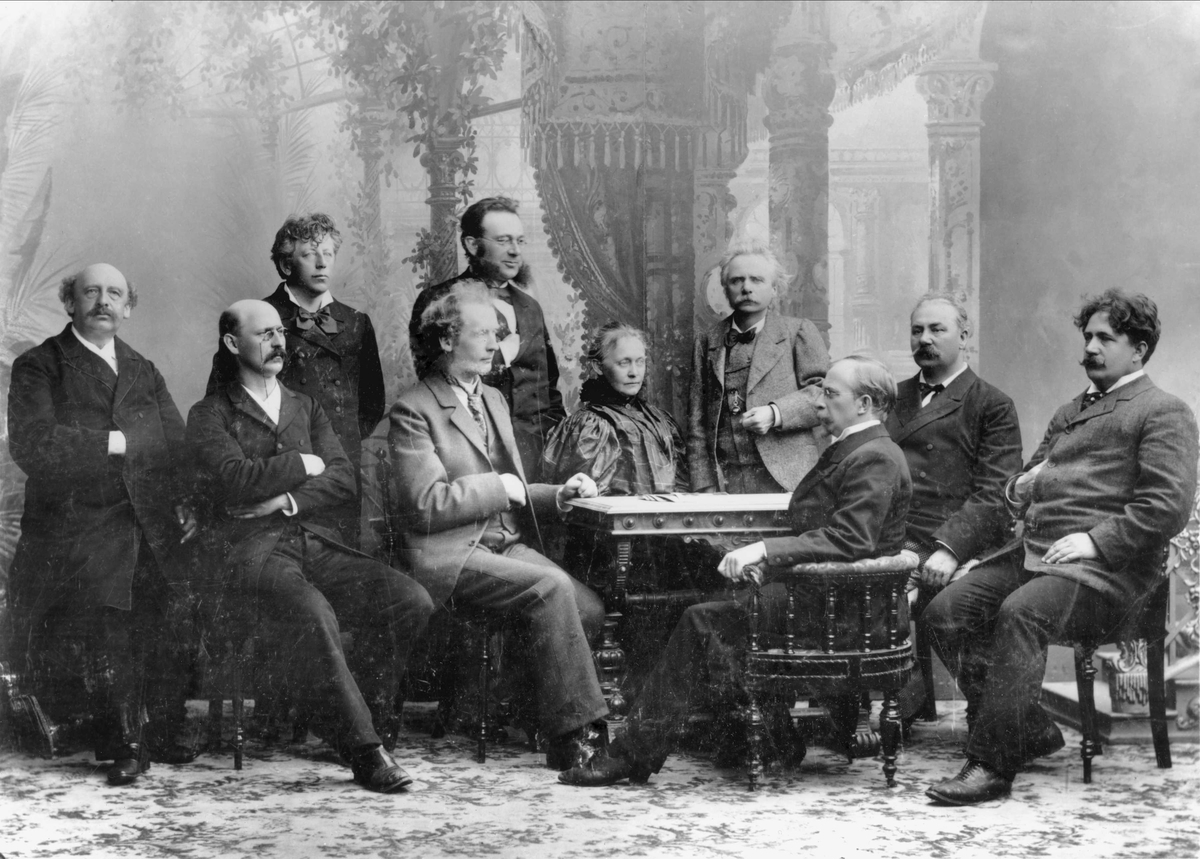
- 1898 music festival in Bergen by Agnes Nyblin. Left to right: Cappelen, Catharinus Elling, Ole Olsen, Gerhard Schjelderup, Iver Holter, Agathe Backer Grøndahl, Edvard Grieg, Christian Sinding, Johan Svendsen, Johan Halvorsen
- Born: 26 January 1845; Drammen, Norway
- Died: 11 May 1916 (aged 71); Oslo, Norway
- Era: Romantic

Christian Cappelen (26 January 1845 – 11 May 1916) was a Norwegian organist and composer.

== Biography ==
Cappelen was born in Drammen, Norway. He studied under Ludvig Mathias Lindeman and at the Leipzig Conservatoire. In 1887, after 20 years as organist in Drammen (Strømsø and Bragernes), he became organist at Vår Frelsers kirke (Oslo Cathedral), a position he held until his death in 1916. He gained a prominent position of the Norwegian Church music. He was also teacher at the practical-theological seminary at the University of Oslo from 1890 until 1916. Cappelen was known as a highly skilled organ player and improviser, and he gave concerts all over Norway. As a composer he is within the romantic era, and was influenced by Mendelssohn and Schumann. He published some songs, piano pieces, organ works, cantatas, and more. Especially known is his melody to the hymn "Min lodd falt mig liflig", which was part of the cantata for the 25-year anniversary of Diakonhjemmet Sykehus (Oslo Deacon Hospital) in 1894. In the Norwegian hymn book (1986), it was called "Min Herre har kalt meg". This hymn is missing from the Norwegian hymn book of 2013, but the melody is passed on to the hymn "Mer hellighet gi meg". Cappelen also prepared for the Messebog for den norske Kirke (1891). Cappelen died in Oslo.
