= Agnes Nyblin =

Norwegian photographer (1869–1945)

- Born: 25 January 1869; Norway
- Died: 20 August 1945 (aged 76)
- Occupation: Photographer
- Spouse: Karl Anton Peter Dyrendahl Nyblin

Agnes Nyblin née Janson (25 January 1869 – 20 August 1945) was a Norwegian photographer. She started a photography business in Bergen with her husband but he died in 1894. She ran the business until 1911.

== Life ==
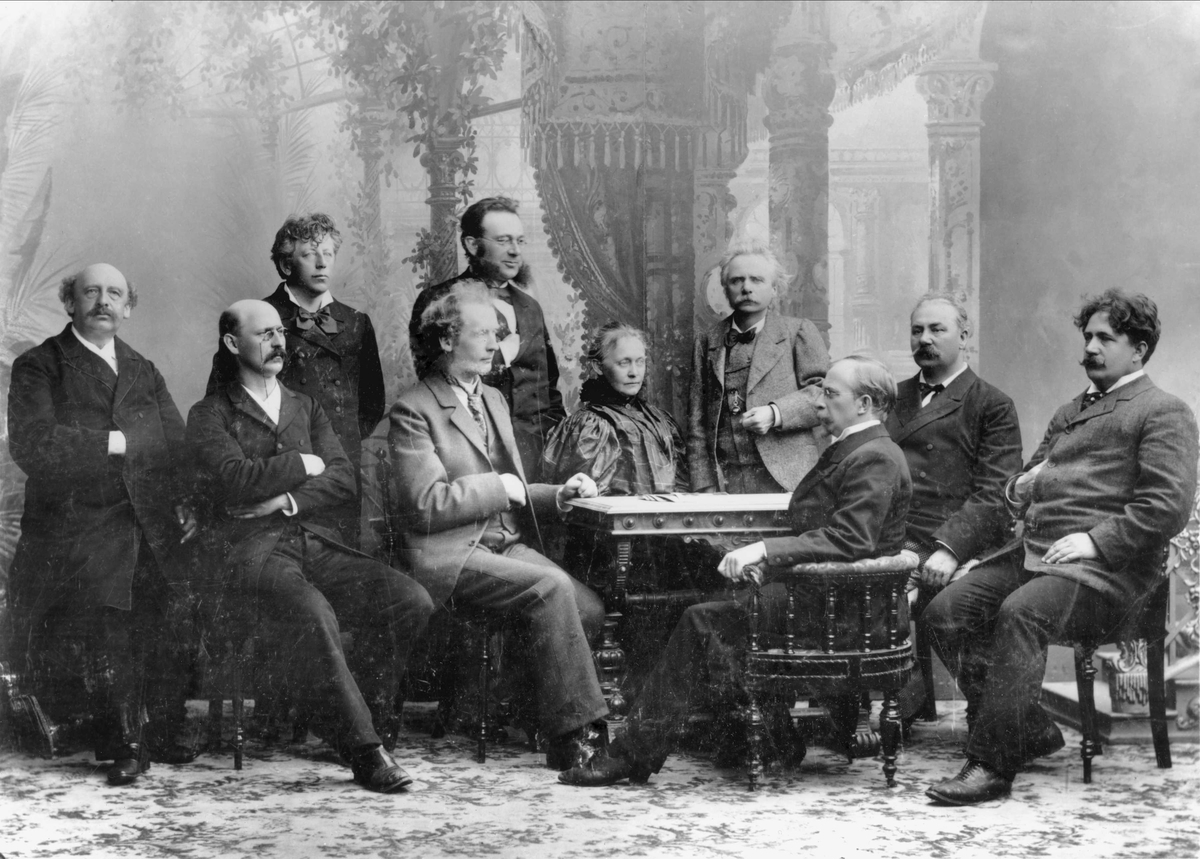
1898 Music festival in Bergen by Agnes Nyblin. Left to right: Christian Cappelen, Catharinus Elling, Ole Olsen, Gerhard Rosenkrone Schelderup, Iver Holter, Agathe Backer Grøndahl, Edvard Grieg, Christian Sinding, Johan Svendsen and Johan Halvorsen

Nyblin was born in 1869 to Jacob Neumann and Marthe Helene (born Schuman) Janson. She married the photographer Karl Anton Peter Dyrendahl Nyblin and they created a studio in Bergen called "K. Nyblin". Her husband died in 1894, but she continued the business successfully.

She became part of a growing number of female Norwegian photographers. The growth was made possible by a change in the law in 1866 which allowed women to have a business. The Encyclopedia of nineteenth-century photography is disparaging about the new group of female photographers but it identifies seven women whose work is of note including Marie Høeg in Horten, Louise Abel in Christiania, Louise Wold in Holmestrand, Augusta Solberg in Lillehammer and Nyblin and Hulda Marie Bentzen in Bergen. Nybin was chosen to be a police photographer in 1897.

The photograph shown was taken at a music festival in 1898 and it records a meeting of many of Denmark's leading composers and musicians.

Nybin retired in 1911. The business continued in the care of her younger brother, Helmich Janson, until four years after her death which was in 1945.
