= Ønskekonserten =

Norwegian radio program

Ønskekonserten (English: Listeners' choice) is a radio program produced by the Norwegian Broadcasting Corporation (NRK). It has been broadcast weekly since January 1950. The signature tune is Entry March of the Boyars, composed by Johan Halvorsen. Ønskekonserten is regarded as the most popular radio program in Norway ever.
