= Nyblin =

Nyblin is a surname. Notable people with the surname include:

- Agnes Nyblin (1869–1945), Norwegian photographer
- Daniel Nyblin (1856–1923), Norwegian photographer
