= Gerhard Schjelderup =

Norwegian composer (1859–1933)

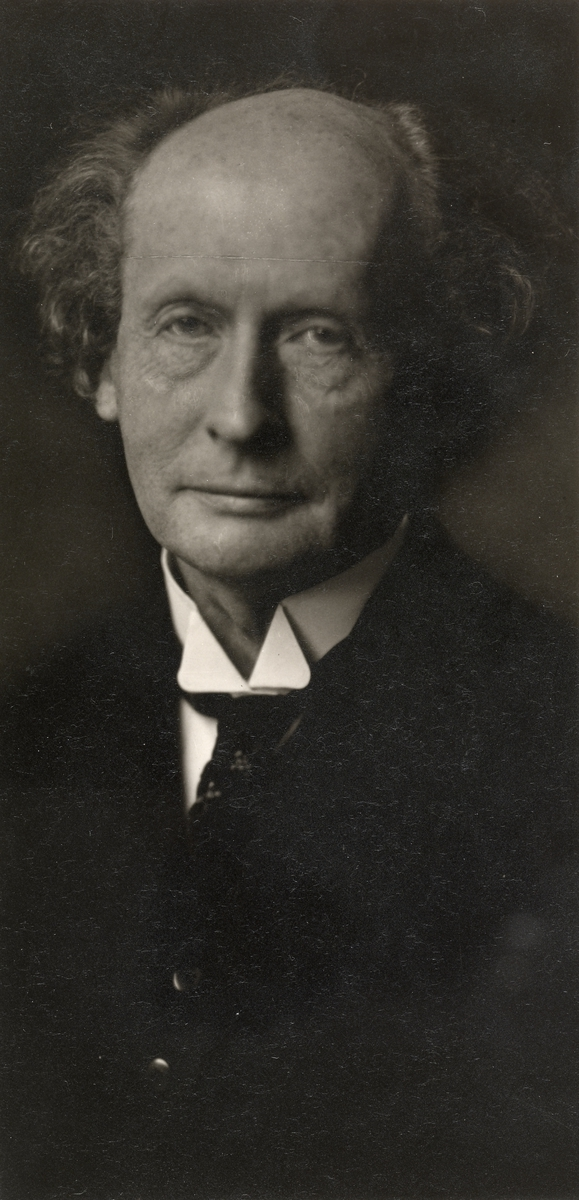
Gerhard Schjelderup, ca. 1930

Gerhard Rosenkrone Schjelderup (November 17, 1859 – July 29, 1933) was a Norwegian composer, known especially for his operas.

== Biography ==
Schjelderup was born in Kristiansand. Norway. One of five children, each with an artistic bent, his talent was encouraged from youth. The composer Mon Schjelderup was his cousin. In 1878 he traveled to Paris, where he studied cello with Auguste Franchomme and music theory with Augustin Savard. He also studied with Jules Massenet at the Conservatoire de Paris. By the time of his return to Norway, in 1884, he had already written a number of works.

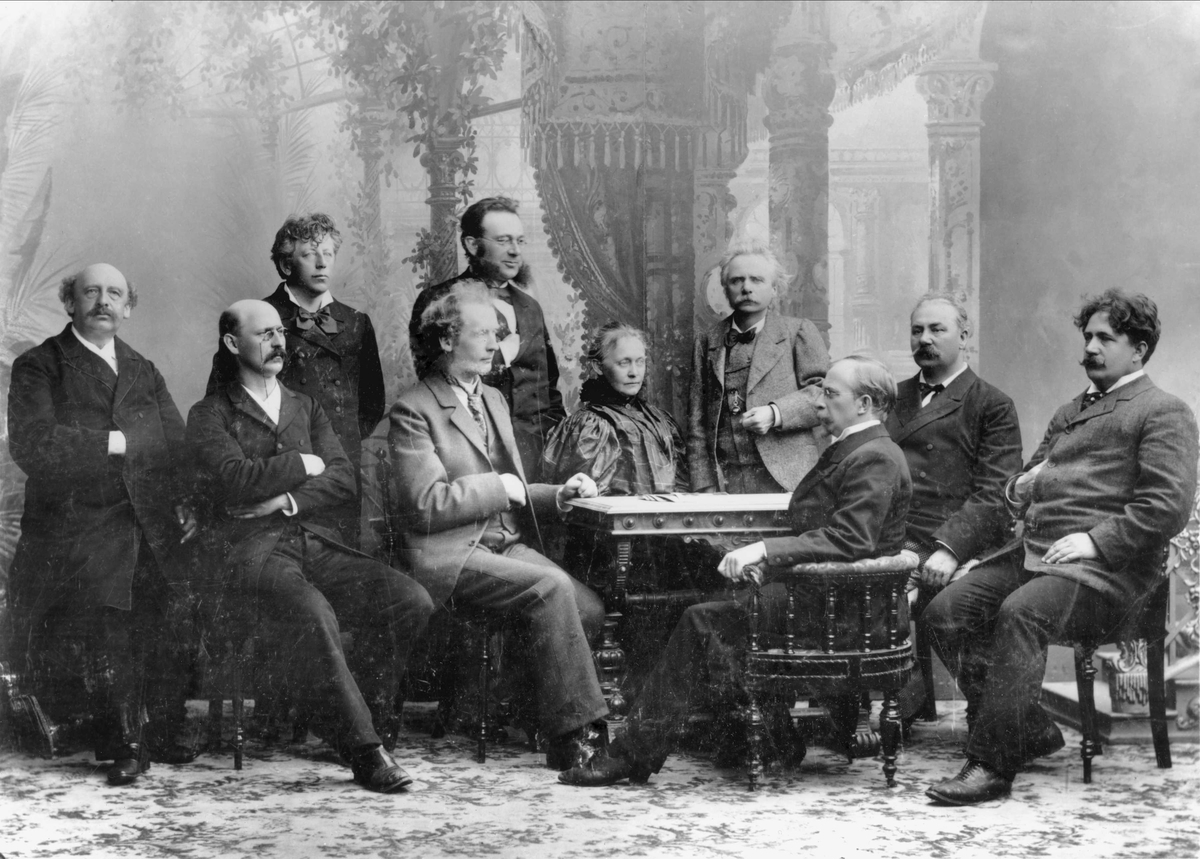
1898 music festival in Bergen by Agnes Nyblin. Left to right: Christian Cappelen, Catharinus Elling, Ole Olsen, Schelderup, Iver Holter, Agathe Backer Grøndahl, Edvard Grieg, Christian Sinding, Johan Svendsen and Johan Halvorsen

Schjelderup was introduced to the work of Richard Wagner while in Paris, and went to Germany for further exposure to his work. This in turn inspired him to write operas, which were to prove the bulk of his output, though he also composed a number of orchestral and chamber works. He wrote on music for Norwegian publications, and wrote biographies of Edvard Grieg and of Wagner. In 1921 together with Ole Mørk Sandvik, he published Norsk folkemusik, særlig Østlandsmusikken which was the first history of Norwegian music.

Schjelderup was among the founders of the Norwegian Society of Composers (Norsk komponistforening) in 1917, and from that year until 1920 he was its chairman. He continued to promote Norwegian music despite living abroad; he died at Benediktbeuern in Bavaria, Germany in 1933.

== Operas ==
- Austanfyre sol og vestanfyre måne (1889–1890) – one act performed at Munich, 1990
- Sonntagmorgen (1891–92) – Munich, 1893
- Norwegische Hochzeit (1894) – Prague, 1900

- as Bruderovet –Kristiania (Oslo), 1919

- En hellig aften (1895) – Kristiania, 1915
- Sampo Lappelill (1890–1900) (based on the fairy tale Sampo Lappelill)
- Et folk i nød (1906–07)
- Vårnatt (1906–07) – Dresden, 1908
- Opal (1915) – Dresden, 1915
- Den røde pimpernell
- Sturmvögel – Schwerin, 1926
- Liebesnächte (1930) – Lübeck 1934

== Documents ==
Letters by Schjelderup are held by the State Archives in Leipzig, company archives of the music publishing house C. F. Peters (Leipzig).
