= Mimsy =

Mimsy may refer to:

- Mimsy, a word introduced by Lewis Carroll in his poem "Jabberwocky"
- Mimsy Were the Borogoves, a short story partly about the poem
- a nanotechnology object from the future in The Last Mimzy, a 2007 science fiction film, based on the above short story
- nickname of Merle Mimsy Farmer (born 1945), American actress
- nickname of Margaret Mimsy Møller (born 1955), Norwegian press photographer
- Mimsy, a fictional character in the TV series The Secret Life of the American Teenager
- Mimsy, a fictional character in the episodes "Crippled Summer" and "Handicar" of the TV show South Park
- Mimsy Laaz, a fictional character in the anime series Super Dimension Century Orguss

== See also ==
- Mimsie the Cat, the cat in the logo of MTM Enterprises
