= Erika Stang =

Norwegian composer and pianist

Erika Stang (1 September 1861 – 28 October 1898) was a Norwegian composer and pianist.

Stang was born in Honefoss to Fredrikke Dorothea Kamstrup and Johan Stang. She studied music with Agathe Backer Grøndahl and Hans Barth in Berlin and taught music in Kristiania during the 1880s and 1890s. She also performed as a pianist, and corresponded with pianist Andreas Martin Knutzen. According to the Norwegian Historical Association, letters they exchanged between 1887 and 1889 have been archived and translated into English. Stang died in Oslo in 1898.

Stang’s music was published by Carl Warmuth. Her compositions include:

== Piano ==
- Bryllupsmarsch
- Childhood Memories
- Fifteen Four-Hand Pieces for Beginners
- Menuet

== Vocal ==
- Four Songs
- “Vaarvise”
