= Thomas Tapper =

Thomas Tapper

Thomas Tapper (28 January 1864 – 24 February 1958) was a musician, composer, lecturer, writer, teacher, and editor, who was born in Canton, Massachusetts, and studied music at the American College of Musicians. He wrote many books on music, mostly for children and young adults. His most famous being Lives of Great Composers picture book series. He also wrote the First Year Series for musical instruction, which included First Year Musical Theory, First Year Counterpoint, First Year Harmony, Second Year harmony, First Year Analysis, and First Year Melody Writing. He was the editor of "The Musician," and promoted rural music and community music. Tapper also promoted rote learning in the rote-note controversy of the late 19th Century music education. His students included Isabel Stewart North and Carrie Burpee Shaw.

Tapper married pianist Bertha Feiring Tapper in 1894.
