= Elisabeth Helmer =

Norwegian photographer (1854 – after 1912)

Elisabeth Helmer (1854 – 1920) was an early Norwegian professional female photographer who had a studio in Grimstad. She was also one of the town's most important women's rights activists.

== Biography ==
Born on 24 October 1854 in Grimstad, Helmer was the daughter of the surveyor Jacob Holst Helmer. She was trained by the German-born Norwegian photographer Louise Abel who ran a studio in Christiania together with her husband Hans Abel. In 1896, she opened her own studio in Grimstad which she managed until 1912 when she ceded the business to Gunhild Larsen whom she had trained and introduced as her business partner in 1902. She also trained many other photographers. In addition to portraits, Helmer also took landscape photographs of Grimstad and the surroundings, several of which have been preserved in the National Library of Norway.

Helmer was also an active feminist, heading the Grimstad branch of Landskvindestemmeretsforeningen, the Norwegian women's rights association, and its successor Kvindernes Klub, the Women's Club.
