= Agathe Backer Grøndahl =

Norwegian pianist and composer (1847–1907)

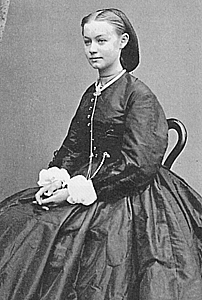
Agathe Backer Grøndahl, c. 1870

Agathe Ursula Backer Grøndahl (1 December 1847 – 4 June 1907) was a Norwegian pianist and composer. Her son Fridtjof Backer-Grøndahl (1885–1959) was also a pianist and composer, who promoted his mother's compositions in his concerts.

== Biography ==
=== Early life ===
Agathe Ursula Backer was born in Holmestrand in 1847, in a wealthy and art-loving home, as the second youngest of four sisters, all gifted in drawing and music. In 1857, she moved with her family to Christiania, where she studied with Otto Winther-Hjelm, Halfdan Kjerulf and Ludvig Mathias Lindeman. Between 1865 and 1867 she became a pupil of Theodor Kullak and studied composition under Richard Wuerst at the Akademie der Tonkunst in Berlin, where she lived together with her sister Harriet Backer. She won fame there with her interpretation of Beethoven's "Emperor" Concerto.

Her parents heavily discouraged her performance career, believing it was unsuitable for a woman. They believed she was better suited to life as a house-wife. In a letter to Kjerrulf, she wrote, “I do not understand how both you and my parents could object to the fact that I want to become what one calls a female artist… It seems to me that a beautiful, independent future for a woman can be found in the simple act of striving, if possible, to be able to present an enjoyable experience to people, especially if that future included a way to travel and see a little of the world! But time will decide. I just feel that there is something in me that will never give me peace… for I love art so much that the desire to master it is indescribable.”

=== Return to Norway ===
After returning to Norway in 1868, she debuted in Christiania with the Philharmonic Society, playing the "Emperor" Concerto under the direction of Edvard Grieg, then 26 years old. A recommendation from Ole Bull led to further studies with Hans von Bülow in Florence in 1871. (Note: Her songs from this early period are in the German Romantic tradition of Felix Mendelssohn and Robert Schumann, but also reflect her own ability to shape a melody and use the piano in a rich manner.) Later the same year she played at the Gewandhaus in Leipzig, becoming a pupil of Franz Liszt in Weimar in 1873. In 1874 she married the conductor and singing teacher Olaus Andreas Grøndahl, and was generally known thereafter as Agathe Backer Grøndahl. During the second half of the 1870s she built up an outstanding pianist career with a series of concerts in the Nordic countries, also playing with very great success in London and Paris.

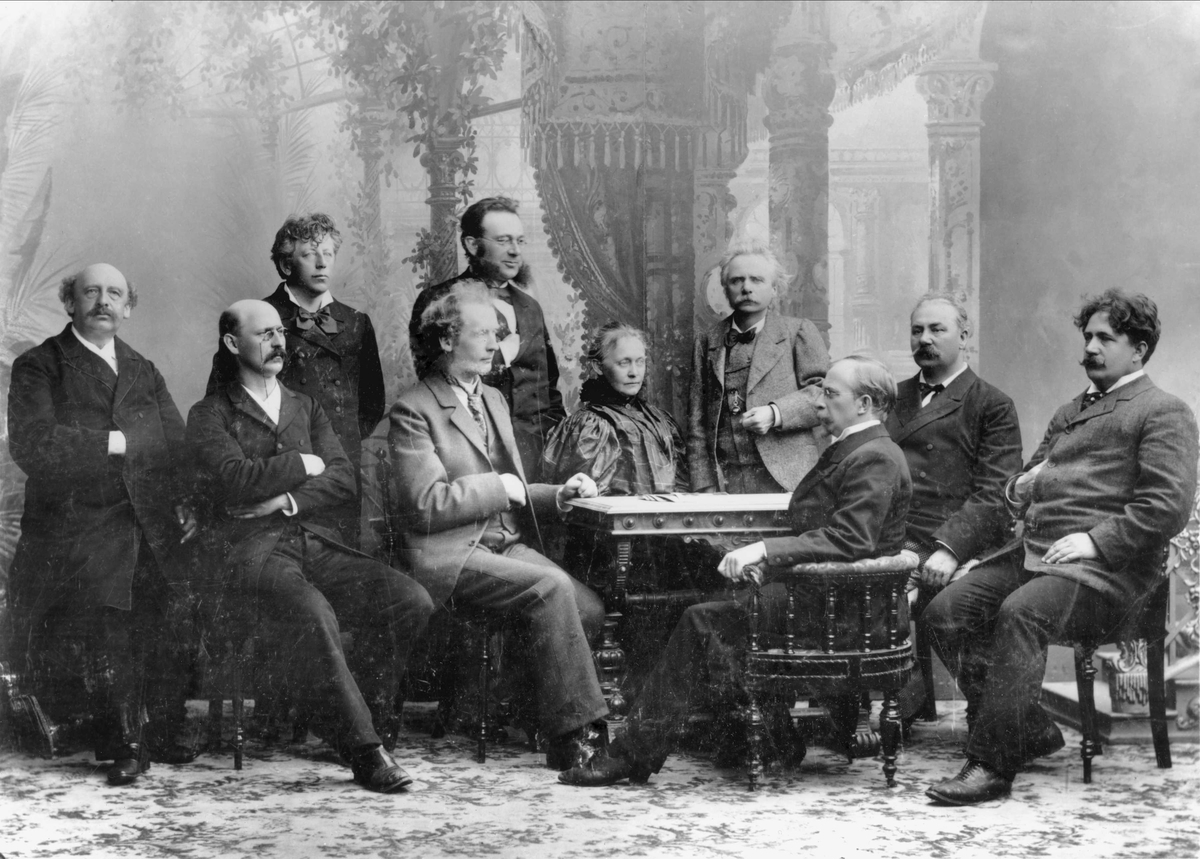
1898 Music festival in Bergen by Agnes Nyblin. Left to right: Christian Cappelen, Catharinus Elling, Ole Olsen, Gerhard Rosenkrone Schelderup, Iver Holter, Agathe Backer Grøndahl, Edvard Grieg, Christian Sinding, Johan Svendsen and Johan Halvorsen

In 1889 and 1890 she gave concerts in London and Birmingham with a wide-ranging program, including Grieg's piano concerto. After that she was proclaimed one of the century's greatest piano artists by George Bernard Shaw, who also remarked on the sensitiveness, symmetry and artistic economy of her compositions. At the World Exhibition in Paris in 1889, she repeated her success with her brilliant interpretation of Grieg's piano concerto. It was then that she began experiencing nerve problems, although she eventually resumed her artistic career as a pianist. Later in the 1890s she became almost completely deaf. She gave her last concerts in Sweden and Finland in the autumn of 1901. Following this development, she retired from her performance career. She continued teaching.

As a teacher, she was markedly successful and influential. Her students included Erika Stang and Bertha Tapper. Her children studied under her and are counted with her gifted pupils. She composed a great deal of music for the piano, and stands at the head of modern music in Norway. Agathe Backer Grøndahl died at her home in Ormøya outside Christiania at the age of 59. Today she is chiefly remembered for her piano compositions.

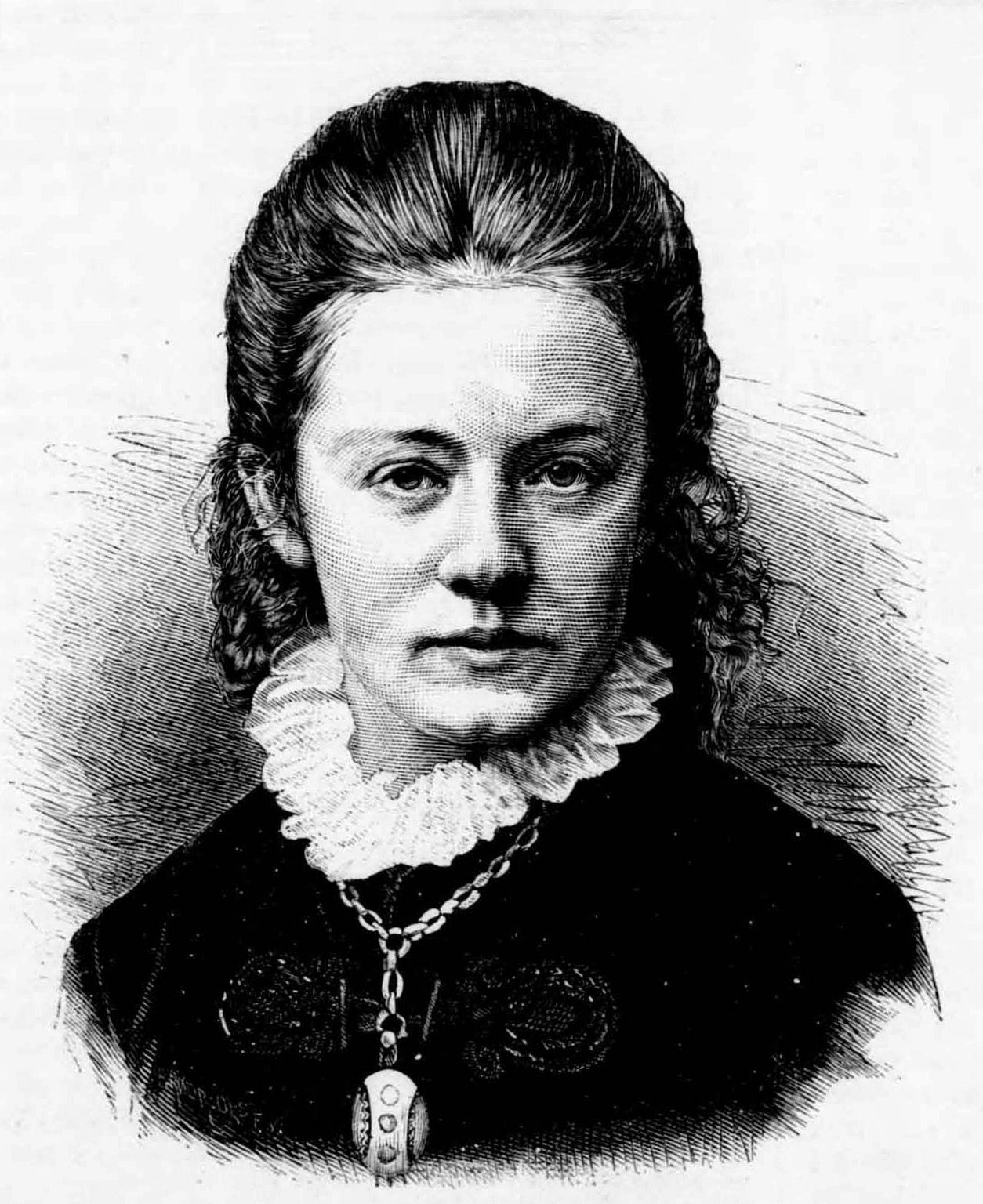

=== Compositional style ===
Agathe Backer Grøndahl played a major role in the period often called the golden age of Norwegian music history. She composed in total some 400 pieces spanning seventy opus numbers. She was a prominent character on the Norwegian musical scene and a close friend of Edvard Grieg. Her earlier compositions synthesized the predominant pianistic and stylistic ideas of 1850s Europe. In her later years however, her style transformed and anticipated some of the early twentieth century impressionistic ideas, which ultimately led the composer Pauline Hall to call her the first true Norwegian impressionist.

== List of works ==
=== Songs ===
- 3 Songs, Op. 1, (1868–9)
- 5 Songs, Op. 2, (1871)
- 5 Songs, Op. 3, (1870–73)
- 7 Songs, Op. 4, (1869–74)
- 4 Songs, Op. 5, (1871–2)
- 6 Songs, Op. 6 (1867–71)
- Summer Life, 4 Songs, Op. 7
- 5 Songs, Op. 8 (1871–6)
- 6 Songs, Op. 9 (1871–9)
- 4 Songs, Op. 10 (1871–5)
- 5 Songs, Op. 12 (1879)
- 5 Songs, Op. 13 (1881)
- 6 deutsche Lieder, Op. 14
- 6 Songs, Op. 16
- Songs at Sea, Op. 17 (1884)
- 7 Folkeviser og Romanser, Op. 18
- Serenade, Op. 21 (1888)
- 5 Songs, Op. 23 (1888)
- 6 Songs, Op. 26 (1890)
- 6 Songs, Op. 27 (1890)
- Chant de Noces: Bryllupsmorgen, Op. 28 (1890)
- 10 Songs, Op. 29, (1892)
- 10 Songs, Op. 31, (1894)
- Norske folkeviser, arrangements, Op. 34 (1894)
- The Night is Calm, Old Folks Waltz, Op. 40 (1897)
- 5 Songs, Op. 41 (1897)
- The Child's Spring Day, song cycle, Op. 42 (1899)
- 8 kjaempeviser, Op. 43 (1896–7)
- 20 folke- og skjaemteviser, Op. 43 (1896–7)
- 5 Songs, Op. 46, (1897–9)
- 2 Sange fra havet, Op. 48
- 3 Sange i moll, Op. 49
- Sommer (Jynge), 8 songs, Op. 50 (1899)
- 12 folkeviser og melodier fra fremmede lande, Op. 51 (1902)
- The Mother Sings, 8 songs, Op. 52 (1900)
- Sydover 6 songs, Op. 54 1900
- Ahasverus, 6 songs, Op. 56 (1900)
- 6 deutsche Liebeslieder aus der Jugend, Op. 60 (1869–1900)
- Clover Field, Op. 62 (1901)
- 4 Songs, Op. 65 (1901–4)
- One more Glimpse, Op. 70 (1907)

=== Piano solo ===
- 6 concert-etuder, Op. 11 (1881)
- 3 morceaux, Op. 15 (1882)
- 4 skizzer, Op. 19 (1886)
- Suite, 5 movements Op. 20 (1887)
- 3 études, Op. 22 (1888)
- 6 idylles, Op. 24 (1888)
- 3 klaverstykker, Op. 25 (1890)
- Norske folkeviser og folkedanse, Op. 30 (1891)
- 3 études de concert, Op. 32 (Copenhagen, 1895)
- Norske folkeviser og folkedanse, Op. 33 (1894)
- 3 klaverstykker, Op. 35 (1894)
- Fantasistykker, Op. 36 (1895)
- Serenade, Op. 37 (1896)
- 3 ungarske studier, Op. 38 (1896)
- Fantasistykker, Op. 39 (1896)
- In the Blue Mountain, fairytale suite, 6 pieces, Op. 44 (1897)
- Fantasistykker, Op. 45 (1897)
- Etudes de concert, Op. 47 (Copenhagen, 1901)
- 3 klaverstykker, Op. 53 (1900)
- Smaa fantasistykker, Op. 55 (1902)
- Etudes de concert, Op. 57 (Copenhagen, 1903)
- Concert-études, Op. 58 (Copenhagen, 1903)
- 6 klaverstykker, Op. 59 (1903)
- Prélude, Op.61, No. 1 (Copenhagen, 1904)
  - Grand menuet, Op.61, No. 2
- Lettere fantasistykker, Op. 63 (Copenhagen, 1904)
- Danse burlesque, Op.64, No. 1 (1905)
  - Valse caprice, Op.64, No. 2
- Barnlige Billeder [Children Pictures], 6 fantasias, Op. 66 (1905)
- 2 klaverstykker, Op. 68 (1907)
- 3 klaverstykker, Op. 69 (1907)
