= Augusta Solberg =

Norwegian photographer (1856–1922)

Augusta Charlotte Solberg (1856–1922) was an early Norwegian professional photographer who managed a studio in Bergen from 1885.

== Biography ==
Born in Bergen on 1 August 1856, Solberg was the daughter of the ferryman and police constable Anders Solberg (1819–1883) and midwife Anna Samuelsdatter Lund (1821–1882). After working for a time with L.C.S. Gram, she took over his Bergen studio. She was assisted by her sisters Valborg and Ragna Solberg who were also photographers. She also worked in Hardanger in the 1890s and Odda in 1911. Her Bergen studio was destroyed by the fire of 1916.

Solberg was one of several women who established early photographic studios in Norway. Others include Marie Høeg in Horten, Louise Abel in Christiania, Louise Wold in Holmestrand, and both Agnes Nyblin and Hulda Marie Bentzen in Bergen.
