= Isabel Stewart North =

American song composer and publisher

Isabel Stewart North (June 20, 1860 – March 6, 1929) was an American song composer, music educator, and publisher.

North was born in Huntingdon, Pennsylvania, to Lucy R. Royer and J. Sewell Stewart. She studied music at the Burlingame Seminary and later in Boston with Chevalier DeKonski, Arthur Foote, and Thomas Tapper. In 1882, she married Herman H. North, and they had one son, Jay North.

The Norths settled in Bradford, Pennsylvania, where Herman served as mayor. Isabel opened a conservatory where she taught piano and voice, and published her music through the North Publishing Company. Her music was performed by singers on tour such as contralto Eleanor Patterson. North was also cited in ads for Weaver Pianos.

The songs composed by North included:

- Book of Lullabies (text by Reverend James Kenyon)
- “I Will Keep Watch O’er Thy Sleep”
- “If I Could Call the Years Back”
- “In His Pity He Redeemed Us”
- “In the Firelight” (text by Eugene Field)
- “Pictures in the Fire” (seven song cycle)
- “Sleep is a Rover”
- “Spanish Boat Song”
- “Sweet Maid Spring Waltz”
- “This is the Road to Sleepy Town”
- “Vain Quest”
