= Entry March of the Boyars =

Orchestral composition by John Halvorsen

Entry March of the Boyars (Norwegian: Bojarenes Inntogsmarsj) is an orchestral composition, written in 1893 from the pen of the Norwegian Johan Halvorsen (1864–1935). It is one of the most popular works of the composer, and quickly became an international success.

The piece has an occupational inspiration behind it. Halvorsen was offered a post at Bucharest Conservatory but he declined. He became however interested in the city and read about it and the entry of the Romanian boyars into Bucharest in the 18th century. The scene almost "forced" him to compose music out of it. The music was first used as stage music at the Bergen theatre where he worked as the director of music. Two years later Halvorsen published an arrangement of the piece for a symphony orchestra.

The melody has been used as a signature tune for the Norwegian Broadcasting Corporation's weekly radio program Ønskekonserten since its start in 1950. It is used as incidental music in the play by August Strindberg, The Dance of Death, in which Edgar asks Alice to play it for him on the piano.

== Sources ==
- Dybsand, Øyvin 2010: Johan Halvorsen: Orchestral Works, Volume 1. [CD liner notes.] Chandos CHAN 10584.
