= Bertha Tapper =

Norwegian composer, pianist and teacher

Bertha Johanne Feiring Maass Tapper
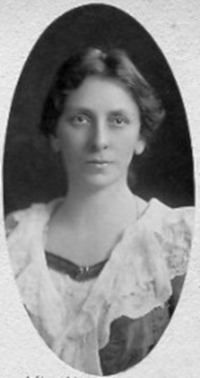
- Bertha Tapper
- Born: 25 January 1859; Oslo, Norway
- Died: 2 September 1915
- Occupation(s): Composer, pianist, teacher
- Notable work: Editing piano works of Edvard Grieg
- Spouse: Thomas Tapper
- Children: Louis Maass, Klea Maass

Bertha Johanne Feiring Maass Tapper (25 January 1859 – 2 September 1915) was a Norwegian composer, pianist, and teacher, best known for editing the piano works of Edvard Grieg for publication in America. She published under the name Bertha Feiring Tapper.

== Biography ==
Tapper was one of nine children born in Christiania, Norway, to Berthe Iversdatter and Lars Olsen Feiring. She married Carl Ludvig Otto Maass and they had a son (Louis) and a daughter (Klea). She later married musicologist Thomas Tapper in New York in 1894.

Tapper studied music with Johan Svendsen and Agatha Backer Grondahl in Norway. In 1878, she graduated from the Conservatory of Music in Leipzig, Germany (today the University of Music and Theatre), and later studied with Theodor Leschetizkey in Vienna.

Tapper emigrated to America in 1881. She taught and performed, both as a piano soloist and as an accompanist, and with the Kneisel Quartet and other musicians. She taught piano at the New England Conservatory from 1889 to 1897, and at the Institute of Musical Art (which became the Juilliard School) from 1905 to 1910. Her students included Abram Chasins, Lev Ornstein, and Kay Swift. She often hosted her students at her summer home in Blue Hill, Maine.

Although Tapper was a composer, she is best known for her editions of Grieg’s piano works published by Oliver Ditson. Ditson’s ad in a 1910 Boston Symphony program for Grieg’s Piano Lyrics and Shorter Compositions edited by Tapper noted that “The editor is in sympathy with the composer's genius and has performed her task with care for details and insight into the characteristic idiom which makes Grieg's music almost synonymous with Norwegian composition.”

== Works ==
Tapper contributed an article, “Mastering Piano Problems,” to the book Piano Mastery by Harriette Brower (Oliver Ditson 1911). She edited at least one piano piece by Emil Sjogren, The Far Country, opus 41. Her editions of Grieg’s piano works, all published by Ditson, include:

- Concerto in a minor for piano and orchestra, opus 16
- Eight Lyric Pieces, opus 12
- Eight Lyric Pieces, opus 38
- From Holberg’s Time, opus 40
- Larger Piano Compositions
- Peer Gynt Suite, opus 46
- Piano Lyrics and Shorter Compositions
- Puck, opus 71
- Six Lyric Pieces, opus 43
- Sketches of Norwegian Life, opus 19
- Sonata in e minor, opus 7
