= Sjur Helgeland =

Norwegian fiddler and composer (1858–1924)

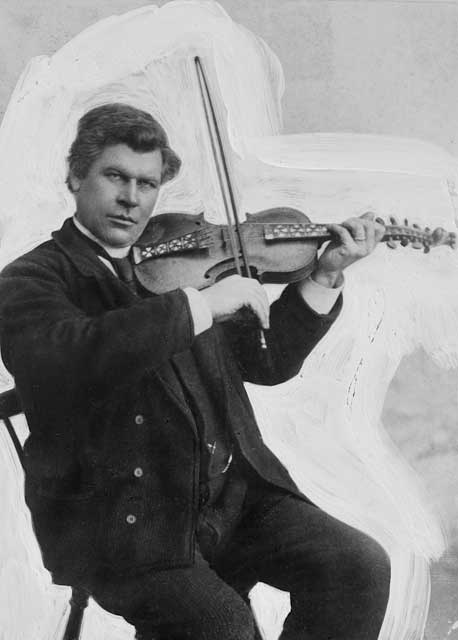
- Sjur Larsson Helgeland by Bergen photographer Hulda Marie Bentzen
- Born: Sjur Larsson Helgeland; 19 August 1858; Voss Municipality, Hordaland, Norway
- Died: 12 April 1924 (aged 65)

Sjur Larsson Helgeland (19 August 1858 − 12 April 1924) was a Norwegian hardingfele fiddler and composer.

== Biography ==
He was born in Voss Municipality in Søndre Bergenhus county, Norway. His parents were Lars Olsson Hirt (1823–1908) and Brita Helgeland (1820–98). He grew up in the rural valley of Myrkdalen in the parish of Vossestrand (later part of Vossestrand Municipality).

He received musical training from local Hardanger fiddle players including Ola Mosafinn (1828–1912). In 1896, he won the first annual Norwegian folk music and dance competition (Vest landskappleiken) conducted at Bergen.

Among his best-known airs is Budeiene på Vikafjell, a composition reflecting the different moods of three dairymaids; sorrow, joy and happiness, combined with cattle call, lows, wind and bird singing.

Helgeland died in 1924 and was buried at Vinje Church (Vinje kyrkje). A stone memorial to Sjur Helgeland was raised in his home village during 1958.
