= Johan Halvorsen =

Norwegian composer, conductor and violinist (1864 - 1935)

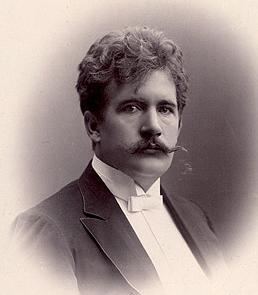

Background information
- Born: 15 March 1864; Drammen, Buskerud, Norway
- Died: 4 December 1935 (age 71) Oslo, Norway
- Genre: Classical
- Occupations: Conductor, pedagogue, violinist
- Instrument: Violin

Johan Halvorsen (15 March 1864 – 4 December 1935) was a Norwegian composer, conductor, and violinist.

== Life ==
Born in Drammen, he was an accomplished violinist from a very early age and became a prominent figure in Norwegian musical life. He received his musical education in Kristiania (now Oslo) and Stockholm, and was a concertmaster in Bergen before joining the Leipzig Gewandhaus Orchestra. He was a concertmaster in Aberdeen, then a professor of music in Helsinki, and finally became a student once again in Saint Petersburg, Leipzig (with Adolph Brodsky), Berlin, (with Adolf Becker), and Liège (with César Thomson).

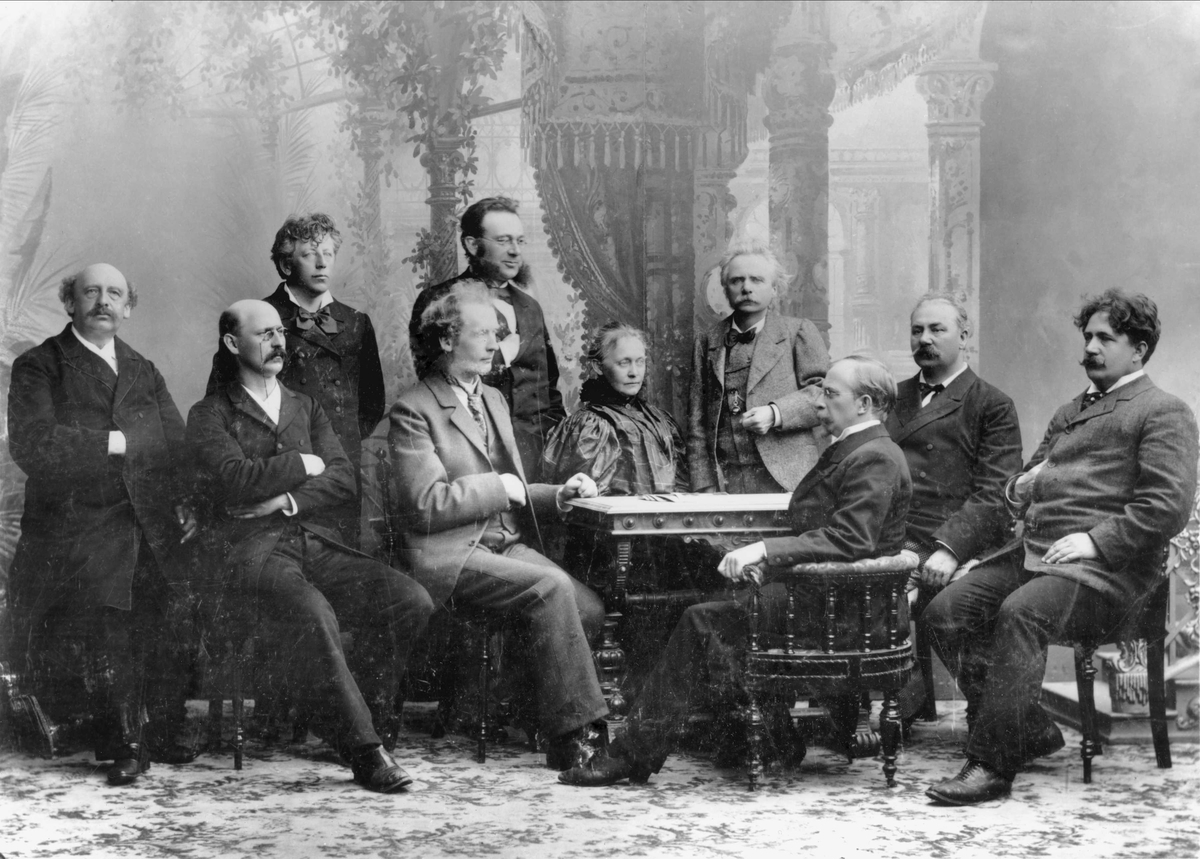
1898 Music festival in Bergen by Agnes Nyblin. Left to right: Christian Cappelen, Catharinus Elling, Ole Olsen, Gerhard Rosenkrone Schelderup, Iver Holter, Agathe Backer Grøndahl, Edvard Grieg, Christian Sinding, Johan Svendsen and Halvorsen

Card Party in Leipzig c. 1887 showing Nina and Edvard Grieg, Johan Halvorsen, Frederick Delius, and Christian Sinding

Returning to Norway in 1893, he worked as conductor of the theatre orchestra at Den Nationale Scene in Bergen and of the Bergen Philharmonic Orchestra. He became concertmaster of the Bergen Philharmonic in 1885, and principal conductor in 1893. In 1899 he was appointed conductor of the orchestra at the newly opened National Theatre in Kristiania, a position he held for 30 years until his retirement in 1929.

As well as theatre music, Halvorsen conducted performances of over 30 operas and also wrote the incidental music for more than 30 plays. Following his retirement from the theatre he concentrated on the composition of his three symphonies and two well-known Norwegian rhapsodies.

Halvorsen's compositions were a development of the national romantic tradition exemplified by Edvard Grieg, though written in a distinctive style marked by innovative orchestration. Halvorsen orchestrated some piano works by Grieg, such as a funeral march which was played at Grieg's funeral. Halvorsen married Grieg's niece Anna and actor Stein Grieg Halvorsen was their son.

His best known works today are the Bojarenes inntogsmarsj (Entry March of the Boyars) and Bergensiana, along with his Passacaglia and Sarabande for violin and viola based on themes by George Frideric Handel.

In early 2016, librarians at the University of Toronto announced that they had located the manuscript score of his violin concerto, performed only three times in 1909 and considered lost. The piece received its fourth performance, 107 years later, in 2016.

== Selected compositions ==
Operetta

- Mod Nordpolen, in 3 acts (1911); libretto by Vilhelm Dybwad

Incidental music

- Gurre, Op. 17; music for the play by Holger Drachmann
- Nordraakiana
- Askeladden
- Reisen til Julestjernen (Journey to the Christmas Star); music for the play by Sverre Brandt
- Tordenskjold, Op. 18; music for the historical play by Jacob Breda Bull
- Kongen (The King), Op. 19; music for the play by Bjørnstjerne Bjørnson
- Fossegrimen, Op. 21; music for the play by Sigurd Eldegard
- Vasantasena; music for the old Indian play
- The Merchant of Venice; music for the Shakespeare play
- Much Ado About Nothing (1915); music for the Shakespeare play
- Livet i skogen, Op. 33; music for Shakespeare's As You Like It
- Dronning Tamara (Queen Tamara); music for the play by Knut Hamsun
- Macbeth (1920); music for the Shakespeare play

Orchestra

- Bojarenes inntogsmarsj (Entry March of the Boyars) for orchestra (or concert band) (1895)
- Festovertyre (Norwegian Festival Overture), Op. 16 (1899)
- Nächtlicher Zug from Miniatures for string orchestra, Op. 29 No. 2 (1910); arrangement by the composer
- Bjørnstjerne Bjørnson in Memoriam, Op. 30 (1910)
- Norway's Greeting to Theodore Roosevelt, Op. 31 (1910)
- Suite ancienne to the Memory of Ludvig Holberg, Op. 31 (1911)
- Festmarsj (Festival March). Op. 32
- Scène funèbre
- Sérénade, Op. 33 (1913)
- Bergensiana, Rococo Variations on an Old Melody from Bergen "Jeg tog min nystemte Cithar i Hænde" (I Took Up My Newly Tuned Zither) (1913)
- Norske rapsodie No. 1 (Norwegian Rhapsody No. 1) in A major (1919–1920)

1. Springar
2. I went so lately to my bed
3. Halling - Springar

- Norske rapsodie No. 2 (Norwegian Rhapsody No. 2) in G major (1919–1920)

1. Dance tune from Åmot
2. Han Ole
3. Springar

- Symphony No. 1 in C minor (1923)
- Symphony No. 2 "Fatum" in D minor (1924, revised 1928)
- Symphony No. 3 in C major (1929)
- Norske eventyrbylleder (Norwegian Fairy-tale Pictures), Op. 37 (1933); reworking of 1925 incidental music

1. Peik, prinsessen og stortrollet (Peik, the Princess and the Big Troll)
2. Prinsessen kommer ridende på bjørnen (The Princess Comes Riding on a Bear)
3. Trollenes inntog i berget det blå (Entry of the Trolls into the Town Hall)
4. Dans av småtroll (Dance of the Little Trolls)

- Festovertyre (Norwegian Festival Overture), Op. 38
- Elegi for string orchestra
- Forspill til den hvite Ring
- Rabnabryllaup uti Kraakjalund, Norwegian Folk-Song Arrangement for string orchestra

Concert band

- Hallingdal Bataljon's Marsj (1882–1883)
- Gatemarsj (Street March)
- Norwegian Sea Picture
- Salutation to the Royal Couple of Norway

Concertante

- Air norvégien (Norwegian Air) for violin and orchestra, Op. 7 (1896/1903).
- Veslemøy's Song for violin and orchestra (1898); dedicated to Kathleen Parlow
- Norwegian Song "The Old Fisherman's Song" for violin and string orchestra, Op. 31 (1901, 1913)
- Andante Religioso for violin and orchestra (1903)
- Concerto in G minor for violin and orchestra, Op. 28 (1909); dedicated to Kathleen Parlow
- Bryllupsmarsch, Norwegian Wedding March for violin and orchestra, Op. 32 No. 1
- Danses norvégiennes No. 1 for violin and orchestra (1915)
- Danses norvégiennes No. 2 for violin and orchestra (1915)

Chamber music

- 6 Stimmungsbilder (6 Mood Pieces) for violin and piano (1890)
- Suite in G minor for violin and piano (1890)
- Danses norvégiennes for violin and piano (1897)
- Elegie (Andante) for violin and piano (1897)
- Passacaglia in G minor on a Theme by George Frideric Handel (from Harpsichord Suite in G minor, HWV 432) for violin and viola or cello (1897)
- Sarabande con variazioni in D minor on a Theme by George Frideric Handel for violin and viola or cello (1897)
- Crépuscule for violin and piano (c. 1898)
- Suite Mosaïque for violin and piano (1898)

1. Intermezzo orientale
2. Entr'acte
3. Scherzino – "Spurven" (The Sparrow)
4. Veslemøys sang (Veslemøy's Song)
5. Fête nuptial rustique (An Old-fashioned Wedding)

- String Quartet in E, Op. 10
- Little Dance Suite for violin and piano, Op. 22
- Slåtter, Peasant Dances for violin solo (1903)
- Miniatures, 5 Easy Pieces for 2 violins and piano, Op. 29 (1910)
- To serenader (Two Serenades) for violin and piano
- Norske viser og danse (Norwegian Folk Songs and Dances), 30 Folk Arrangements for violin and piano
- Concert Caprice on Norwegian Melodies for 2 violins

Choral

- Varde, Cantata for male chorus and orchestra, Op. 11 (1904); words by Per Sivle
- Alrune for soprano solo, female chorus and chamber orchestra, Op. 20 No. 1
- Kantate ved kroningen i Trondhjems Domkirke den 22 juni 1906 for soprano, baritone, mixed chorus, orchestra, harp and organ, Op. 27 (1906); words by Sigvald Skavlan
- Bergensiana for mixed chorus
