= Bolette Berg =

Norwegian photographer (1872–1944)

Bolette Berg (22 September 1872–18 June 1944) was a Norwegian photographer. She and her partner Marie Høeg ran a photography studio, Berg & Høeg Fotoatelier, in Horten, a busy naval port in the southeast of Norway. At the time photography was immensely fashionable for those rich enough to afford it, and the two made their money selling portraits and landscapes of their surroundings. Their studio was used not just for their work, however, but also as a meeting place for women that was free from the judgement and strict social cues of society at the time. They were one of many photography studios in Horten in that period – many visitors and naval officers wished to purchase photographs as souvenirs, and thus there was quite a large industry.

In 1903, Berg and Høeg moved to Kristiania (now Oslo), where they set up a publishing company named Berg og Høghs Kunstforlag A.S. Here they published postcards, art magazines and reproductions of art from the National Gallery, as well as the book Norske Kvinde, a three-volume text on the history of Norwegian.

Very little else is documented about the pair, aside from their deaths in 1944 (Berg) and 1949 (Høeg).

In the 1980s, a box marked private was discovered inside a barn that had been owned by the couple. The box was, somewhat controversially, opened apparently against their wishes, and inside was discovered a series of glass negatives. These photographs showed Berg and Høeg, sometimes along with others, both positioned and dressed in ways that broke all societal norms and conventions of the time. In many of them the subjects are dressed in stereotypically men's clothing, often complete with a pipe and fake moustache, whilst in others they are wearing what is stereotypically feminine. The negatives are now owned by the Preus Museum.
