= Harald Bjørkøy =

Norwegian singer and professor

Harald Bjørkøy (born 16 January 1953) is a Norwegian tenor from Trondheim, Norway. He made his debut in 1982 and has since then been singing concerts in Europe and in the USA. In 1991 he made his debut at Weill Recital Hall at Carnegie Hall, New York City. He is a professor of music at the Grieg Academy at the University of Bergen, has appeared with many of the Norwegian Symphony Orchestras and has been a guest in main roles at the Norwegian Opera.
