= Johanna Ullricka Bergstrøm Skagen =

Swedish-born Norwegian photographer

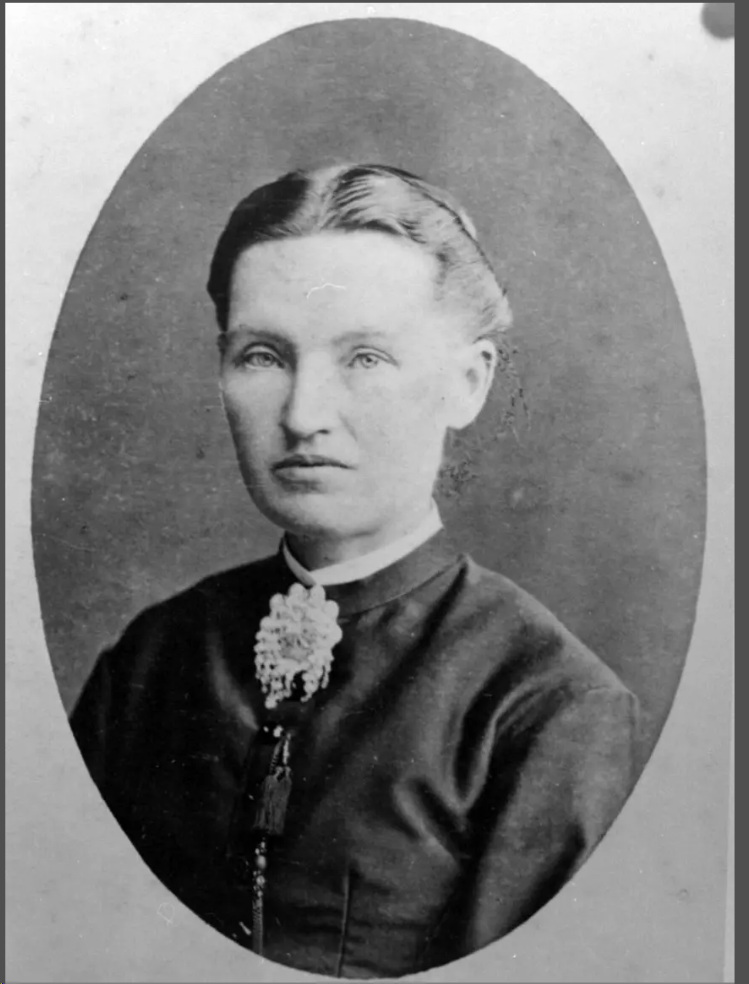
Johanna Ullricka Bergstrøm Skagen

Johanna Ullricka Bergstrøm Skagen (1839–1882), was a Swedish-born Norwegian photographer. She is known as one of the first professional female photographers in Norway.
