= Mimsy Møller =

Norwegian photographer

- Born: Margaret Irene Møller; 2 November 1955 (age 70); Oslo, Norway
- Education: Bennington College
- Awards: 1st prize, Daily Life in Norway, Picture of the Year Competition (2006)

Margaret Irene "Mimsy" Møller (born 2 November 1955 in Oslo, Norway) is a Norwegian press photographer, living in Oslo.

Møller is a 1979 graduate of Bennington College, Vermont, United States, where she studied photography and German literature. She has worked as a photographer and journalist at The Bennington Banner, Vermont, and photographed for the United Press International in the USA. In Norway she worked as a press photographer for the daily newspaper Dagsavisen (formerly Arbeiderbladet) from 1984 - 2022. She is one of the so-called "first generation women press photographers" in Norway.

In 2006, she won 1st prize in the category Daily Life in Norway in the press photographers Picture of the Year Competition. She is represented in the collection of The National Museum of Art, Architecture and Design in Oslo and the Robert Meyer Collection. Her work is also in the collection of Preus museum in Horten, Norway.

In the 1980s, she was active in the women’s photo group Hera and the women's radio station RadiOrakel in Oslo. Møller is represented by the Norwegian photo agency Samfoto NTB in Oslo.
