= Marie Magdalene Bull =

Norwegian actor, photographer (1827–1907)

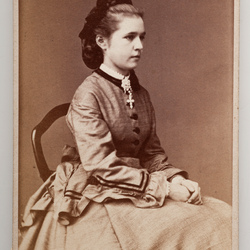
- Born: October 25, 1827; Bergen, Norway
- Died: July 17, 1907 (aged 79); Bergen, Norway
- Occupation: Photographer

Marie Magdalene Bull née Midling (25 October 1827 – 17 July 1907) was a Norwegian actress who took a leading role in the first performance at Bergen's Det norske Theater. Following her marriage to the theatre's conductor Edvard Storm Bull, in 1851 she gave up acting to become a photographer, opening her own studio.

== Biography ==
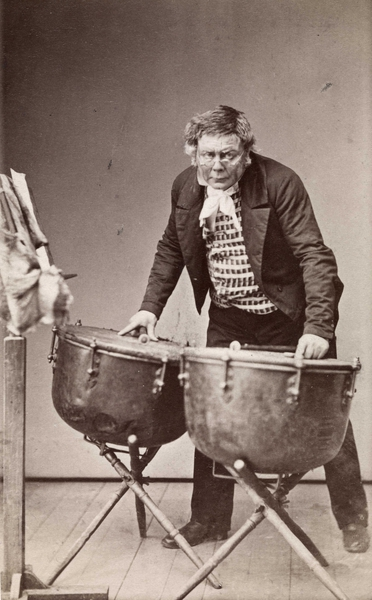
Johannes Brun photographed by Marie Bull in 1855

Born in Bergen on 25 October 1827, Marie Magdelene Midling was the daughter of the auctioneer Wilhelm Christian Midling and Maria Magdalena Herlufsen.

She grew up in Bergen where, on 25 July 1849, she saw an advertisement in the paper announcing the opening of Det norske Theater, the country's first Norwegian-speaking theatre. It called for applications from those interested in working there. She immediately applied and was taken on as an actress and dancer, performing at the theatre's first rehearsal with an invited audience on 21 November 1849 and at the official opening on 2 January 1850. She played Pernille in Ludvig Holberg's Henrik og Pernille, against Johannes Brun as Henrik. The performance was well received by the critics.

On 6 January 1851, she married Edvard Storm Bull (1814–1907), the theatre's music director and the brother of the theatre's director Ole Bull who was also a celebrated violinist. Together they had seven children. In accordance with the traditions of the day, she gave up her work as an actress in November 1850 just before her wedding. She nevertheless maintained an interest in the theatre, describing in her memoirs the theatre's beginnings and the company's first tour to Kristiansund in the summer of 1850.

On leaving the theatre, she turned to photography, opening her own studio. She employed German born Maximilian Behrends (1839–1903) as her assistant until he opened his own studio in the city in 1867. Several of Marie Bull's works have been preserved. One of the oldest, dated 1855, is a photograph of Johannes Brun performing in Hun skal debutere.

Marie Magdalene Bull died in Bergen on 17 July 1907.
