= Louise Abel (photographer) =

Norwegian photographer (1841–1907)

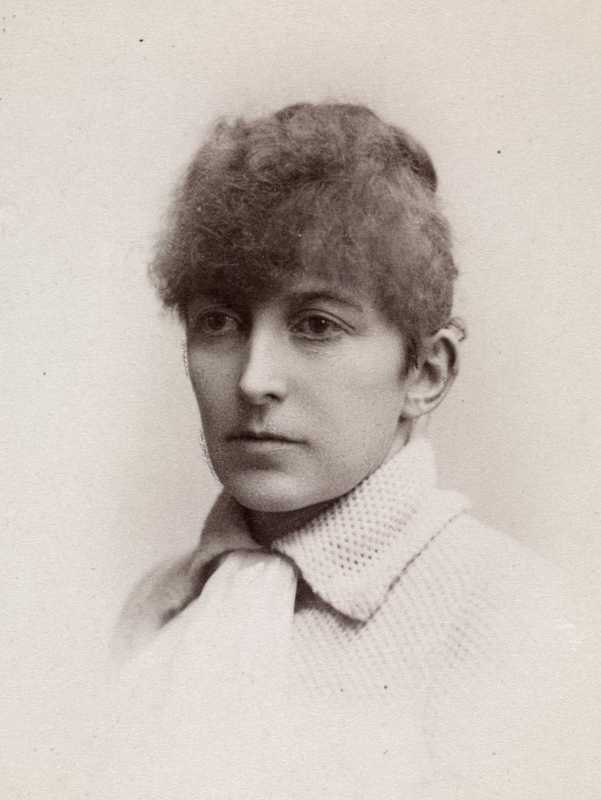
Photograph of Thora Hansson taken by Louise Abel circa 1890.

Louise Doris Sophie Pauline Abel (née Kleffel, 1841–1907) was a German-born Norwegian photographer who from 1864, together with her husband Hans Abel, ran a studio and photographic supplies business in Christiania, today's Oslo.

== Biography ==
Born in Goldberg, in the Grand Duchy of Mecklenburg-Schwerin on 5 November 1841, Abel was the daughter of the photographer Ludwig Gustav Kleffel (1807–1885) and Emilie Fredenhagen (1816–1895). In 1863, the Norwegian pharmacist Hans Abel went to Goldberg to be trained as a photographer by Kleffel. There he met Louise, also a trained photographer, and married her the following year. Later in 1864, the couple returned to Norway and opened a photographic studio and supplies business in the centre of Christiania. Louise Abel ran the studio while her husband took care of the sales in photographic chemicals and equipment. She also produced Christmas cards to compete with poor quality prints from abroad. Known as L. Abel & Co., the studio was managed by the Abels until 1890 when it was sold to Sine Kraft who had worked there since 1882.

Abel was one of several women who established early photographic studios in Norway. Others include Marie Høeg in Horten, Augusta Charlotte Solberg in Lillehammer, Louise Wold in Holmestrand, and Hulda Marie Bentzen in Bergen.
