= Marie Høeg =

Norwegian photographer (1866–1949)

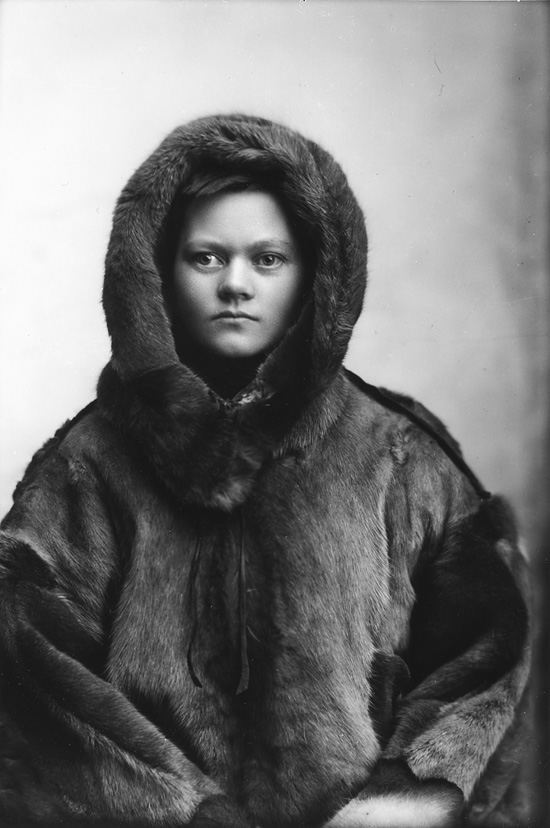
- Høeg wearing fur coat
- Born: 15 April 1866; Langesund, United Kingdoms of Sweden and Norway
- Died: 22 February 1949 (aged 82); Oslo, Norway
- Known for: Photography

Marie Høeg (15 April 1866 – 22 February 1949) was a Norwegian photographer and suffragist. Høeg's published work was traditional in nature, while her private photography, including images of and created with her partner, Bolette Berg, challenged ideas of gender. She was the founder of the Horten Discussion Association, which is still active today. Høeg also started the Horten Branch of the National Association for Women's Right to Vote, the Horten Women's Council and the Horten Tuberculosis Association.

== Biography ==
Høeg was born in Langesund on 15 April 1866. She was a photography student in Brevik and completed her photography apprenticeship in 1890.

From 1890 to 1895, Høeg lived in Finland, working as a photographer in Ekenäs and Hanko. Here, she was greatly influenced by the Finnish women's rights movement.

Høeg moved from Finland to Horten in 1895 together with Bolette Berg. Berg was five years younger than Høeg and had trained as a photographer, probably while living in Finland. Høeg and Berg set up and ran their own photography studio, which was named Berg & Høeg. Høeg used their studio not only for photography, but also as a meeting place for women interested in feminism and women's suffrage.

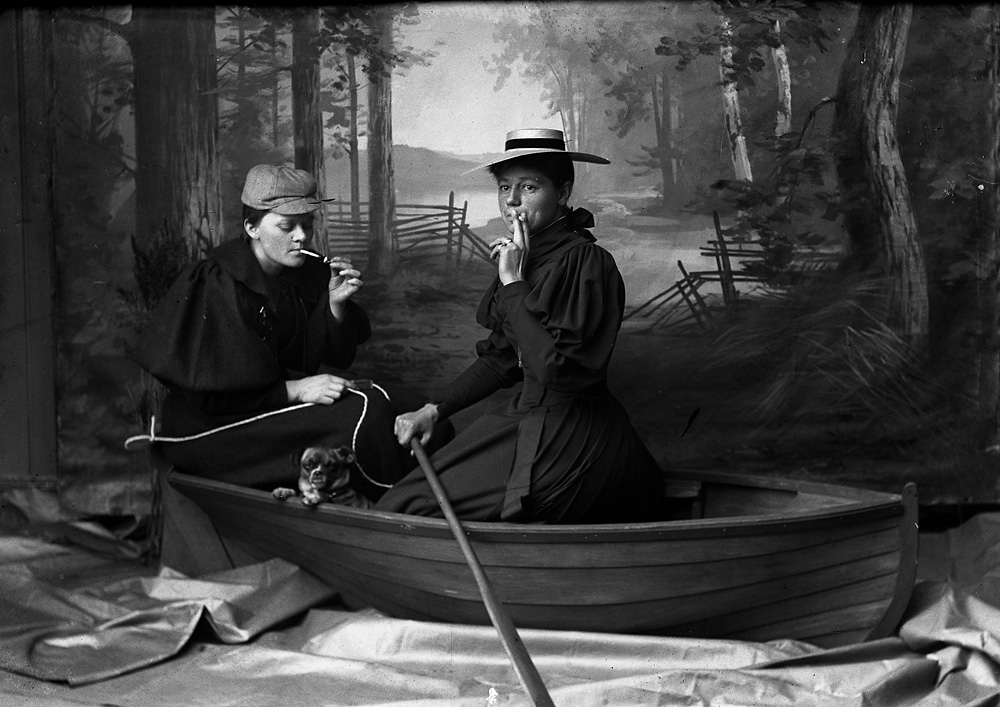
Høeg and her partner Bolette Berg in one of their own photos

Høeg and Berg moved to Kristiania (present-day Oslo) in 1903 and continued working as professional photographers there, mostly producing scenic and portrait post cards.

The two founded the publishing company Berg og Høghs Kunstforlag A.S., publishing books such as the three-volume Norske Kvinder, which concerns the topic of the history of Norwegian women.

Marie Høeg died in Oslo on 22 February 1949.

Many of her glass negatives were discovered after her death inside a barn in the 1980s. The barn was on the property of a farm where Berg and Høeg lived at the end of their lives. A series of negatives in a box labelled "private" contained photographs of Berg and Høeg dressed in men's clothes, smoking, and wearing mustaches. These 440 glass negatives are now in the collection of the Preus Museum.
