= Ole Olsen (composer) =

Norwegian organist, composer and conductor (1850–1927)

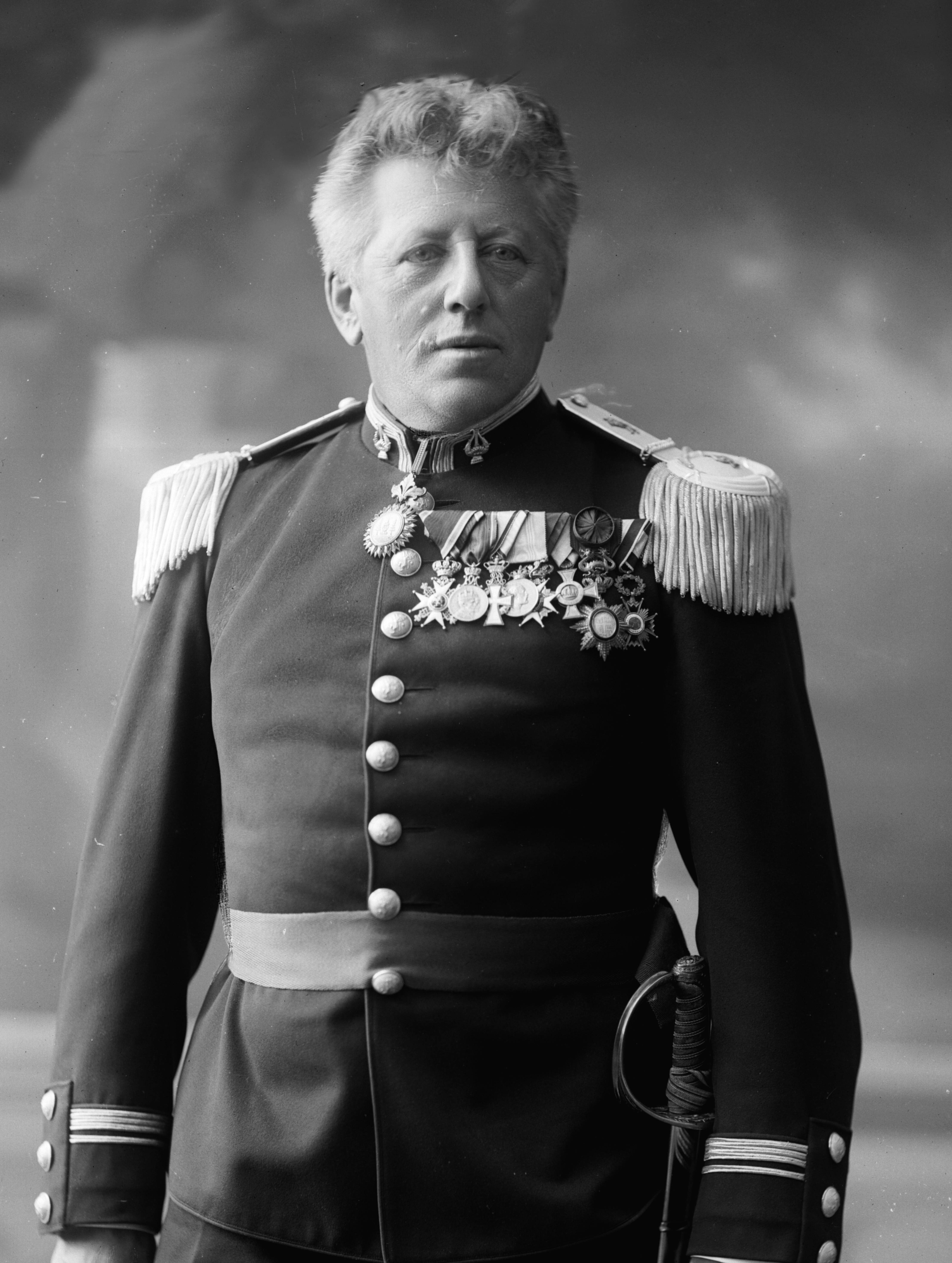
- Ole Olsen, photographed by Gustav Borgen in 1909

Background information
- Born: 4 July 1850; Hammerfest, Norway
- Died: 4 November 1927 (age 77) Oslo, Norway
- Genres: Classical
- Occupations: Composer, conductor, organist, pianist, violinist
- Instruments: Piano, pipe organ, violin

Ole Olsen (4 July 1850 – 4 November 1927) was a Norwegian organist, composer, conductor and military musician.

== Life ==
Olsen was born in Hammerfest, in the county of Finnmark. His mother died when he was young. His father was Iver Olsen, a craftsman and an amateur musician who played the organ at the local church. From a young age Olsen learnt to play the piano and the violin. At the age of five he composed his first small piece, and by the age of seven he sometimes stood in for his father playing the church pipe organ.

In 1865 Olsen went to Trondheim as apprentice to a craftsman. He also studied composition and the organ from Fredrick and Just Lindeman, and sometimes substituted for Just as the organist in the Trondheim cathedral. In 1870, having given up his apprenticeship, he moved to Leipzig where he studied under Oscar Paul at the music conservatory until 1874. There he wrote his Symphony in G major, and began his opera Stig Hvide.

In 1874 he became a teacher in Christiania (now Oslo), where he spent most of the rest of his life. He conducted the Christiania Artisans' Choral Society from 1876–1880, the Music Society orchestra from 1877–1880, and the freemason's orchestra from 1894–1908. From 1884 he was the music director of the Akershus 2nd Brigade. From 1899–1920 he was a music inspector.

He had married Marie Hals, the daughter of piano manufacturer Karl Hals, in 1879. He died in Oslo on November 4, 1927. His interment was at Cemetery of Our Saviour.

== Music ==
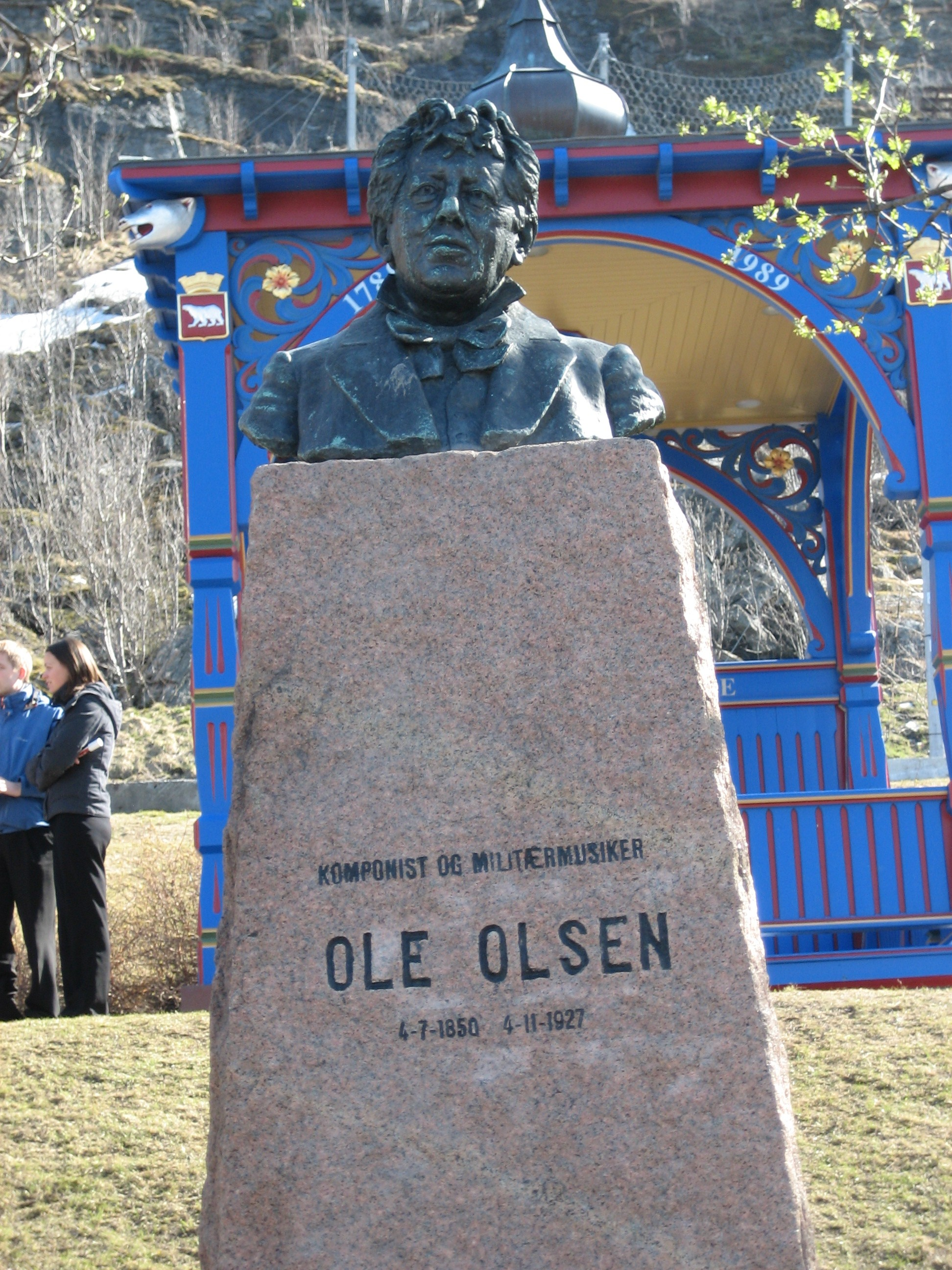
Close-up of Ole Olsen's bust in Hammerfest

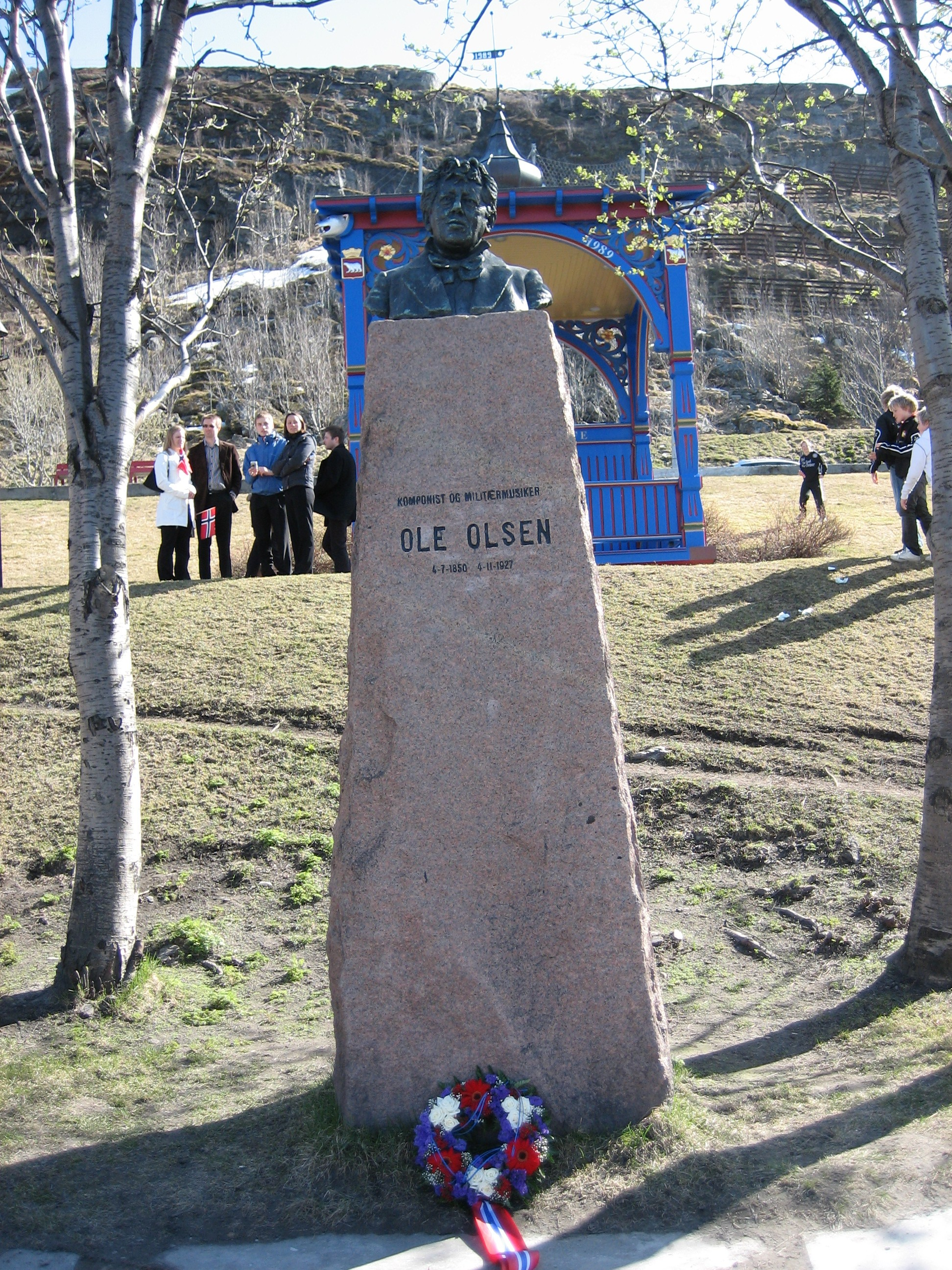
Ole Olsen's monument in Hammerfest on Constitution Day, 2007

Olsen's operas were influenced by Richard Wagner. Another strong influence was the traditional Joik form of song, as he was involved in collecting folk tunes while in the military. These influenced the large number of military marches he composed, and the nationalist tradition was also represented in his stage works.

His compositions include:

- operas
  - Stig Hvide (1872–76)
  - Lajla (1893)
  - Stallo (1902)
  - Klippeøerne (1904–10)
- oratorio
  - Nidaros (1897)
- cantatas
  - Ludvig Holberg (1884)
  - Griffenfeldt (1897)
  - Broderbud (n.d.)
- male chorus
  - Fanevakt (n.d.)
  - I jotunheimen (n.d.)
- symphonic poems
  - Asgårdsreien (1878)
  - Alfedans
- orchestral
  - Symphony in G major
  - Petite Suite for piano and strings (1902)
  - Trombone Concerto (1905)
  - Væringetog
  - Ritornell
  - Romance
  - Tarantelle
- others
  - Svein Uræd (1890)
  - King Erik XIV (1882)
  - piano pieces
  - military marches

== Recordings ==
- (rel. 1991) Ole Olsen: Little Suite for piano & string orchestra; Piano works by 7 women composers — Jorunn Marie Bratlie (piano), Norwegian Radio Orchestra, Christian Eggen (cond.) — Norsk Kulturråds Klassikerserie NKFCD 50024-2
- (rel. 2003) A Norwegian Rendezvous, Vol. 2: Music from the Romantic Period [includes Olsen's Suite for strings, Op.60; Miniature Suite, Op.68; Two anglaises; Vals lento] — Kristiansand Chamber Orchestra, Jan Stigmer (leader) — Intim Musik 81
- (rec. 2009) Ole Olsen: Asgaardsreien, Op.10; Symphony in G major, Op.5; Suite for string orchestra, Op.60 — Latvian National Symphony Orchestra, Terje Mikkelsen (cond.) — Sterling CDS 1086-2
- (rel. 2007) Shadow Songs [includes Olsen's Humoreske (No.2 of 3 Lieder); Paa Fjeldet, Op.7 No.1; Irmelin Rose, Op.56] — Harald Bjørkøy (tenor), ? (piano) — Euridice EUCD 040
- (rec. 2011) Ole Olsen: Symphony No.1, Op.5; Trombone Concerto, Op.48(46); Asgaardsreien, Op.10 — Christian Lindberg (trombone & cond.), Arctic Philharmonic Orchestra, Rune Halvorsen (cond.) — BIS BIS-1968 SACD
- (rel. 2013) Ole Olsen: Rav [23 Songs: complete Opp.7, 24, 56, 60, 65; 3 songs from Op.68; 3 Lieder; Forvarssang; Karinssang; Sov, sov barnelil] — Ingebjørg Kosmo (mezzo-soprano), Thor Inge Falch (tenor); Sergej Osadchuk (piano) — Euridice EUCD 084

=== Recordings on YouTube ===
From CDs listed above

- From the BIS CD: Asgaardsreien, Op.10
- From the Intim CD (Complete CD playlist):
  - Suite from Svein Uræd, Op.60: 1. Sang; 2. Nordlys og isfjell; 3. Vaar; 4. Drøm; 5. Amongst Gypsies; 6. Dverger og alfer; 7. Solefallssang
  - Miniature Suite, Op.68: 1. Baatfart; 2. Serenade; 3. Sagn; 4. Intermezzo; 5. Landsbyspillemann
  - Two anglaises
  - Vals lento
- From the Euridice Shadow Songs CD: Humoreske (No.2 of 3 Lieder); Paa Fjeldet, Op.7 No.1; Irmelin Rose, Op.56 (Harald Bjørkøy)
- From the Euridice Rav CD: Complete CD playlist

From different CDs

- Serenade, Op.19 No.2 (Militært 80 Manns Janitsjarkorps)
- Serenade, Op.19 No.2 (The Band Of His Majesty The King'S Guard - Norway, conducted by Kjell Martinsen)
- Sørgemarsch, Op.41 (The Band Of His Majesty The King'S Guard - Norway, conducted by Kjell Martinsen)
- Sørgemarsch, Op.41 (The Staff Band of the Norwegian Armed Forces, conducted by Ole Kristian Ruud)
- Overture to Svein Uræd, Op.60 (The Staff Band of the Norwegian Armed Forces, conducted by Ole Kristian Ruud)
- Solefallssang from Svein Uræd, Op.60 (Njål Sparbo)
- Garmo-marsjen (Forsvarets Stabsmusikkorps)
- Numedals Bataljonsmarsj (The Band Of His Majesty The King'S Guard - Norway, conducted by Kjell Martinsen)
- Regimentmarsch (Oslo Brigade Orchestra, conducted by Jan Eriksen)

Unknown

- Petite suite, Op.50 for piano and strings (Johan Eian, Norwegian Radio Orchestra, conducted by Sverre Bruland)

Live performances

- Klippeøerne (concert performance, with piano accompaniment, 2020)
- Asgaardsreien, Op.10 (The Arctic Philharmonic, conducted by Christian Lindberg)
- Piano works performed by Phillip Sear:
  - From the Petite suite, Op.50: 1. Fanitul; 2. Mazurka; 3. Serenade; 4. Humoreske
  - Valse-Caprice, Op.52
