= Eurovision Young Musicians =

International youth classical music competition

- Also known as: Eurovision Competition for Young Musicians
- Genre: Music contest
- Created by: European Broadcasting Union
- Based on: BBC Young Musician
- Presented by: Various presenters
- Countries of origin: Various participating countries
- Original language: English
- No. of episodes: 22 contests

Production
- Production location: Various host cities
- Running time: 90 minutes (2010–2012, 2018); 120 minutes (2014–2016, 2022–2024); 170 minutes (2026)
- Production companies: European Broadcasting Union; Various national broadcasters

Original release
- Release: 11 May 1982 – present

Related
- Eurovision Young Dancers

Eurovision Young Musicians (French: L'Eurovision des Jeunes Musiciens), often shortened to EYM, or Young Musicians, is a classical music competition for musicians aged between 12 and 21. It is organised by the European Broadcasting Union (EBU) between members of the union, who participate representing their countries. Some participating broadcasters hold national selections to choose its representative for the contest.

The first edition of Eurovision Young Musicians took place in Manchester, United Kingdom on 11 May 1982, with six countries taking part. The contest was won by Markus Pawlik representing West Germany, who played the piano. The competition is held biennially; although the next contest will take place in 2027 (a year after the previous edition). The twenty-second and most recent edition took place in Yerevan, Armenia on 6 June 2026 and was won by Michał Stochel, who played the accordion for Poland. The upcoming edition is scheduled to be held in Liepāja, Latvia.

Austria is the most successful country in the contest, having won six times: in 1988, 1998, 2002, 2004, 2014, and 2024, and has hosted the contest a record six times.

== Background and history ==
The idea to organise a competition for young musicians was first examined by the EBU Expert Group for television music programmes in March 1980 during a meeting chaired by BBC's Humphrey Burton in Geneva, Switzerland.

Eurovision Young Musicians, inspired by the success of BBC Young Musician, is a biennial competition organised by the European Broadcasting Union (EBU) for musicians that are 18 years old or younger. The BBC competition was established in 1978 by Burton, Walter Todds and Roy Tipping, former members of the BBC Television Music Department. Michael Hext, a trombonist, was the inaugural winner that year.

As a result of the success of the British competition, the Eurovision Young Musicians competition was initiated in 1982. The first edition of Eurovision Young Musicians took place in Manchester, United Kingdom on 11 May 1982, with six countries taking part. Some participating broadcasters held national heats in order to select its representative for the contest. Germany's Markus Pawlik won the contest, with France and Switzerland placing second and third respectively. It was also notable that Germany won the Eurovision Song Contest 1982 just a few weeks earlier. Three years later, the EBU decided to create a dance version based on this competition, which became Eurovision Young Dancers. That event took place in odd years, while Eurovision Young Musicians takes place in even years.

In 1986, due to the increasing number of participating broadcasters, a semi-final round was introduced at the competition, from which, according to the results of the jury's voting, five to eight of them progressed to the televised final. Following this, the competition did not undergo any major changes for a number of years. In 2006, the competition was one of the central events of the Year of Mozart and to celebrate the 250th anniversary of the birth of Wolfgang Amadeus Mozart, the pieces performed by the finalists were restricted to Mozart or pieces from his contemporaries.

Between 2006 and 2012, the competition was the opening event of one of the largest festivals in Europe, Vienna Festival and was held on an open-air stage for the first time. The 2018 contest was hosted by the BBC in partnership and as a highlight of the annual Edinburgh International Festival. The 2020 edition of the contest was scheduled to take place in Zagreb, Croatia on 21 June to coincide with World Music Day celebrations. The final of the contest would have taken place on an open-air stage in King Tomislav Square, with the semi-finals held on 17 June in the Bers Hall of the Zagreb Academy of Music. However, on 18 March 2020, it was announced that the event had been postponed indefinitely due to the COVID-19 pandemic in Europe. The future of the contest remained uncertain until 3 February 2022, when Norwegian broadcaster NRK confirmed, in an online article regarding its national selection Virtuos, that the upcoming edition would instead now be held in Montpellier, France in July.

In August 2025, the EBU announced a series of reforms that would be implemented ahead of the 2026 edition. Key points of the reform include a two-year broadcast contract cycle, inflation-based fee indexation, an improved fallback hosting rule, and improved rights management. These changes aim to provide greater "predictability and stability", enabling both participating broadcasters and hosts to plan their activities more effectively well in advance. In January 2026, the Belgian broadcaster RTBF reportedly revealed that the contest would now be held on an annual basis, but following the conclusion of the 2026 edition, the EBU confirmed that the event would continue to be held biennially, although the next contest will take place in 2027 (a year after the previous one) with the city of Liepāja, in Latvia, designated as the host city for the 2027 edition.

== Format ==
The generic logo used for the 2012, 2014 and 2016 editions of the contest.

Each country is represented by one young talented musician that performs a piece of classical music of their choice accompanied by the local orchestra of the host broadcaster and a jury, composed of international experts, decides the top three participants. From 1986 to 2012 and again in 2018, a semi-final round took place a few days before the contest, and the jury decided as well which participants qualified for the final.

A new feature added for the 2008 contest was the audience prize, with both the live audience at the venue and television viewers in the host country being able to vote by SMS to choose their favourite musician.

A new preliminary round took place in 2014, with the jury scoring each musician and performance, however all participants automatically qualified for the final. The scores in this round were taken into consideration with those in the Grand Final to help the jury decide the three prize winners. The semi final elimination stage of the contest was expected to return in 2016. However the semi-finals were later removed due to the low number of participants that year.

For a number of past contests (1992, 1994, 1998 and 2002), a compilation album was released by the host broadcaster and supported by an independent record label.

== Participation ==
Eligible participants include primarily active member broadcasters (as opposed to associate members) of the EBU. Active members are located in countries that fall within the European Broadcasting Area, or are member states of the Council of Europe.

The European Broadcasting Area is defined by the International Telecommunication Union:

The "European Broadcasting Area" is bounded on the west by the western boundary of Region 1, on the east by the meridian 40° East of Greenwich and on the south by the parallel 30° North so as to include the northern part of Saudi Arabia and that part of those countries bordering the Mediterranean within these limits. In addition, Armenia, Azerbaijan, Georgia and those parts of the territories of Iraq, Jordan, Syrian Arab Republic, Turkey and Ukraine lying outside the above limits are included in the European Broadcasting Area. (Note: The European Broadcasting Area was expanded in November 2007 by the World Radiocommunication Conference (WRC-07), also to include Armenia, Azerbaijan and Georgia.)

The western boundary of Region 1 is defined by a line running from the North Pole along meridian 10° West of Greenwich to its intersection with parallel 72° North; thence by great circle arc to the intersection of meridian 50° West and parallel 40° North; thence by great circle arc to the intersection of meridian 20° West and parallel 10° South; thence along meridian 20° West to the South Pole.

Active members are broadcasting organisations whose transmissions are made available to at least 98% of households in their own country which are equipped to receive such transmissions. If an EBU active member broadcaster wishes to participate, it must fulfil conditions as laid down by the rules of the contest (of which a separate copy is drafted annually).

Eligibility to participate is not determined by geographic inclusion within the continent of Europe, despite the "Euro" in "Eurovision" – nor does it have any relation to the European Union. Several countries geographically outside the boundaries of Europe have been represented: Israel, Cyprus, and Armenia, in Western Asia, since 1986, 1988, and 2012 respectively. In addition, several transcontinental countries with only part of their territory in Europe have competed: Russia, since 1994; and Georgia, since 2012.

Broadcasters from forty-two countries have participated in Eurovision Young Musicians since it started in 1982. Of these, eleven have won the contest.

As of 2026, Eurovision Young Musicians has had the most "one-and-done" participants of any continuous Eurovision event that has run for more than two years. No fewer than eight countries have made only one appearance at the event prior to withdrawing (Albania, Bosnia and Herzegovina, Bulgaria, Georgia, Moldova, North Macedonia, Serbia and Montenegro and Turkey). Comparatively, there have been two (Serbia and Montenegro and Switzerland) for the Junior Eurovision Song Contest, and one (Morocco) for the flagship Eurovision Song Contest. It also has two cases of a country withdrawing after winning the previous edition, which happened when Russia withdrew from the planned and later cancelled 2020 contes (along with 2022 where Russia was banned from entering) and when Austria withdrew from the 2026 contest; there was also one instance each at Eurovision Young Dancers (Ukraine withdrawing from the 2005 edition) and the Eurovision Song Contest (Israel withdrawing from the 1980 edition).

It was the first EBU event to include a large number of former Soviet states and Warsaw Pact member states, many of whom debuted in the Young Musicians prior to their Eurovision Song Contest debut (including the Czech Republic, Hungary, Latvia, North Macedonia, and Poland).

Participation since 1982: Entered at least once Never entered, although eligible to do so Competed as a part of another country, but never as a sovereignty

Year	Country making its début entry
1982	Austria; France; Germany; Norway (Note: The four Nordic countries (Denmark, Norway, Finland and Sweden) originally sent a joint participant to the contest. In 1982, the musician represented the Norwegian colors and the Finnish colors in 1984. The nations were represented individually, following the introduction of a preliminary round, at the 1986 contest.); Switzerland; United Kingdom
1984	Finland; Netherlands
1986	Belgium; Denmark; Ireland; Israel; Italy; Sweden; Yugoslavia
1988	Cyprus; Spain
1990	Greece; Portugal (Note: Portuguese broadcaster Radiotelevisão Portuguesa (RTP) attempted to take part in 1986, but were forced to withdraw as it had been unable to provide a "qualified candidate".)
1992	Hungary; Poland
1994	Croatia; Estonia; Latvia; Lithuania; Macedonia; Russia; Slovenia
1998	Slovakia
2000	Czech Republic; Turkey
2002	Romania
2006	Bulgaria; Serbia and Montenegro
2008	Serbia; Ukraine
2010	Belarus
2012	Armenia; Bosnia and Herzegovina; Georgia
2014	Malta; Moldova
2016	San Marino
2018	Albania (Note: For the 2004 contest, Albanian broadcaster Radio Televizioni Shqiptar (RTVSH) was provisionally listed as the 18th participant in the semi finals, however in the end did not take part or broadcast the contest.)

== Hosting ==
Most of the expense of the contest is covered by commercial sponsors, the host broadcaster, and contributions from the other participating broadcasters. The contest is considered to be a unique opportunity for promoting the host country as a tourist destination. The table below shows a list of cities and venues that have hosted Eurovision Young Musicians, one or more times. Future venues are shown in italics. With 6 contests, Austria and its capital, Vienna have hosted the most contests. It has also shared two venues with the Eurovision Song Contest (Edinburgh's Usher Hall, which hosted both the 1972 song contest and the 2018 Young Musicians; and Bergen's Grieg Hall, which hosted both the 1986 song contest and the 2000 Young Musicians).

Host cities of Eurovision Young Musicians: A single contest / Multiple contests

No.	Country	City	Venue	Years
6	Austria	Vienna	Musikverein	1990
6	Austria	Vienna	Konzerthaus	1998
6	Austria	Vienna	Rathausplatz	2006; 2008; 2010; 2012
3	Germany	Berlin	Konzerthaus	2002
3	Germany	Cologne	Cologne Cathedral	2014; 2016
2	Switzerland	Geneva	Victoria Hall	1984
2	Switzerland	Lucerne	Culture and Congress Centre	2004
2	United Kingdom	Manchester	Free Trade Hall	1982
2	United Kingdom	Edinburgh	Usher Hall	2018
2	Norway	Bergen	Grieg Hall	2000
2	Norway	Bodø	Stormen Concert Hall	2024
1	Denmark	Copenhagen	Radiohuset	1986
1	Netherlands	Amsterdam	Concertgebouw	1988
1	Belgium	Brussels	Cirque Royal	1992
1	Poland	Warsaw	Philharmonic Concert Hall	1994
1	Portugal	Lisbon	Cultural Centre of Belém	1996
1	France	Montpellier	The Corum	2022
1	Armenia	Yerevan	Yerevan Opera Theatre	2026
1	Latvia	Liepāja	Great Amber Concert Hall	2027

== Instruments and their first appearance ==
List contains only instruments played in the televised finals (preliminary rounds or semi finals are not included).

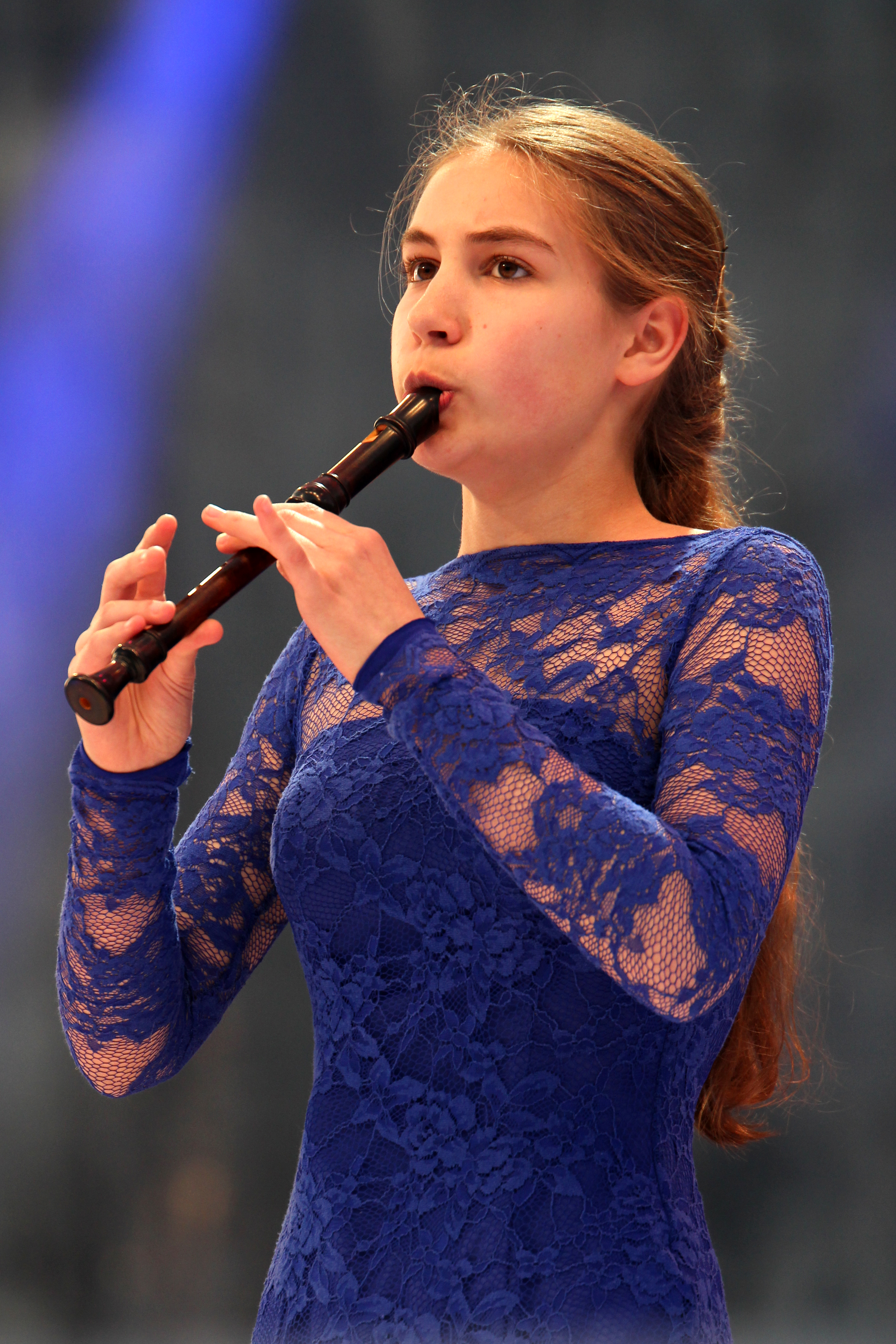
Lucie Horsch from the Netherlands played the recorder in 2014

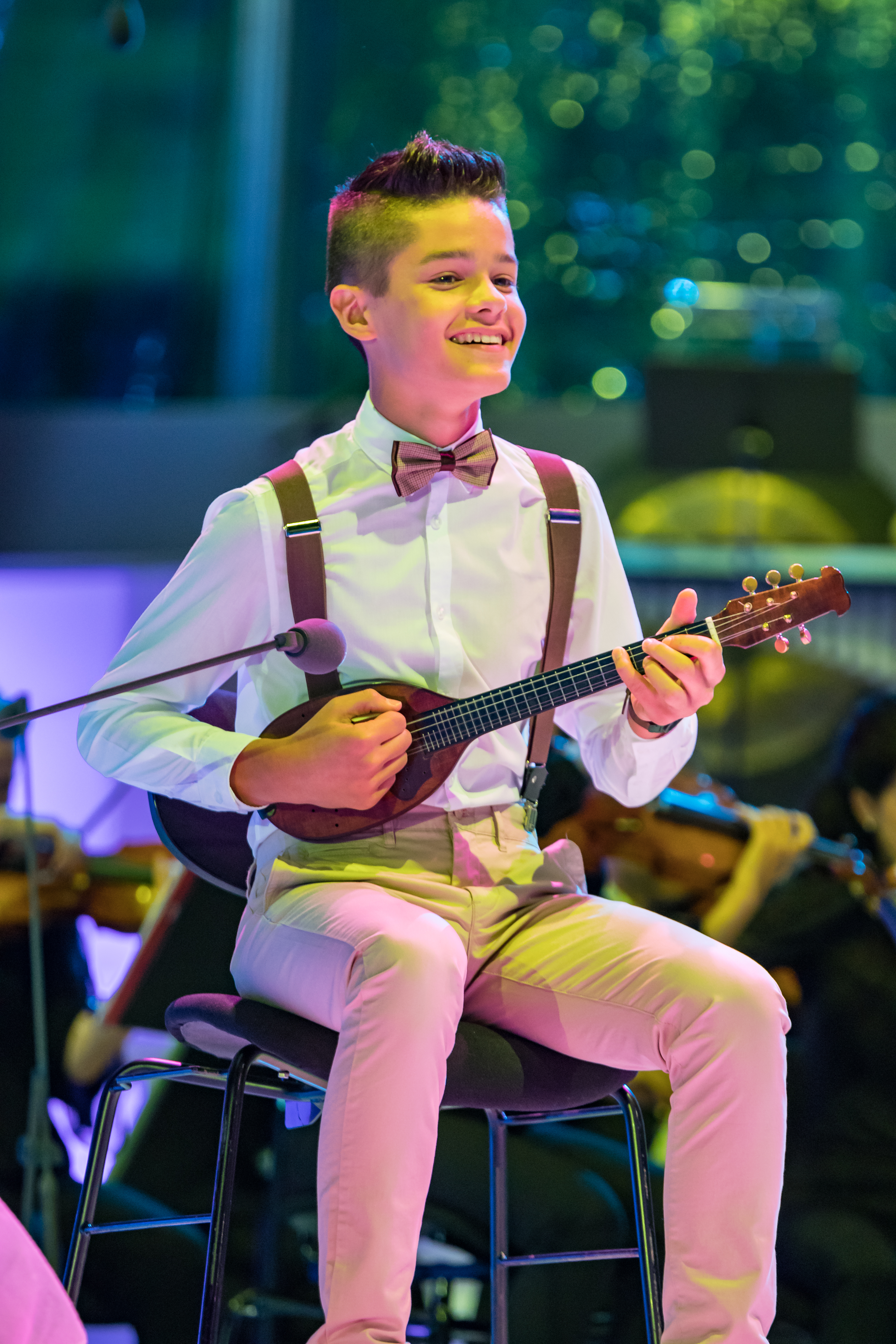
Croatia's Marko Martinović played the Tamburica in 2016

Order	Instrument	First appearance	Country	First performer
1	Piano	1982	United Kingdom	Anna Markland
2	Clarinet	1982	France	Paul Meyer
3	Violin	1982	Norway	Atle Sponberg
4	Viola	1984	France	Sabine Toutain
5	Cello	1984	Switzerland	Martina Schuchen
6	Horn	1988	United Kingdom	David Pyatt
7	Accordion	1990	Belgium	Christophe Delporte
8	Harmonica	1992	Spain	Antonio Serrano
9	Trombone	1994	Switzerland	David Bruchez
10	Organ	1994	Denmark	Frederik Magle
11	Percussion	1998	United Kingdom	Adrian Spillett
12	Double bass	2000	Hungary	Ödön Rácz
13	Trumpet	2000	France	David Guerrier
14	Harp	2000	Netherlands	Gwyneth Wentink
15	Saxophone	2004	Germany	Koryun Asatryan
16	Oboe	2006	Switzerland	Simone Sommerhalder
17	Cimbalom	2012	Belarus	Alexandra Denisenya
18	Bassoon	2012	Czech Republic	Michaela Špačková
19	Kanun	2012	Armenia	Narek Kazazyan
20	Guitar	2014	Malta	Kurt Aquilina
21	Recorder	2014	Netherlands	Lucie Horsch
22	Tamburica	2016	Croatia	Marko Martinović
23	Euphonium	2024	Switzerland	Valerian Alfaré
24	Marimba	2026	Belgium	Simon Nakhimovitch

== Winners ==
As of 2024, there have been twenty-one editions of the Eurovision Young Musicians competition, with each contest having one winner. Austria is the only country to have ever scored a home victory, with violinist Lidia Baich winning the 1998 contest in Vienna. Austria is also one of only two countries to have hosted after winning the previous contest (as was the case in 1988 and 2006), alongside Poland, who hosted the 1994 contest after winning the 1992 edition. It is the only Eurovision event to date to have multiple instances of the same country winning that also won that year's Eurovision Song Contest (Germany won both events in 1982 and Austria won both in 2014), and the only instance of one country hosting multiple major Eurovision events in the same year (the United Kingdom, who hosted both the 1982 Song Contest and Young Musicians, thereby also making it the sole occasion where the same country not only won multiple Eurovision events in the same year, but did both in the same host country).

=== Winners by year ===
Year	Date	Host city	No.	Winner	Performer	Instrument	Piece
1982	11 May	(United Kingdom) Manchester	6	Germany	Markus Pawlik	Piano	Piano Concerto No. 1 by Felix Mendelssohn
1984	22 May	(Switzerland) Geneva	7	Netherlands	Isabelle van Keulen	Violin	Violin Concerto No. 5 by Henri Vieuxtemps
1986	27 May	(Denmark) Copenhagen	15	France	Sandrine Lazarides	Piano	Piano Concerto E flat by Franz Liszt
1988	31 May	(Netherlands) Amsterdam	16	Austria	Julian Rachlin	Violin	Violin Concerto No. 2 by Henryk Wieniawski
1990	29 May	(Austria) Vienna	18	Netherlands	Niek van Oosterum	Piano	Piano Concerto, 1st mov. by Edvard Grieg
1992	9 June	(Belgium) Brussels	18 (Note: The official list of performers in the preliminary round is unknown.)	Poland	Bartłomiej Nizioł	Violin	Violin Concerto by Johannes Brahms
1994	14 June	(Poland) Warsaw	24	United Kingdom	Natalie Clein	Cello	Cello Concerto, 1st mov. by Edward Elgar
1996	12 June	(Portugal) Lisbon	22	Germany	Julia Fischer	Violin	Havanaise by Camille Saint-Saëns
1998	4 June	(Austria) Vienna	18	Austria	Lidia Baich	Violin	Violin Concerto No. 5, 1st mov. by Henri Vieuxtemps
2000	15 June	(Norway) Bergen	24	Poland	Stanisław Drzewiecki	Piano	Piano Concerto No. 1, 3rd mov. by Frederic Chopin
2002	19 June	(Germany) Berlin	20	Austria	Dalibor Karvay	Violin	Carmen Fantasie by Franz Waxman
2004	27 May	(Switzerland) Lucerne	17	Austria	Alexandra Soumm	Violin	Violin Concerto No. 1, 1st mov. by Niccolò Paganini
2006	12 May	(Austria) Vienna	18	Sweden	Andreas Brantelid	Cello	Violoncello Concerto, 1st mov. by Joseph Haydn
2008	9 May	(Austria) Vienna	16	Greece	Dionysis Grammenos	Clarinet	Clarinet Concerto, 4th mov. by Jean Françaix
2010	14 May	(Austria) Vienna	15	Slovenia	Eva Nina Kozmus	Flute	Flute Concerto, 3rd mov. by Jacques Ibert
2012	11 May	(Austria) Vienna	14	Norway	Eivind Ringstad	Viola	Viola concerto, 2 and 3 mov. by Béla Bartók
2014	31 May	(Germany) Cologne	14	Austria	Ziyu He	Violin	Violin Concerto No. 2 by Béla Bartók
2016	3 September	(Germany) Cologne	11	Poland	Łukasz Dyczko	Saxophone	Rhapsody pour Saxophone alto by André Waignein
2018	23 August	(United Kingdom) Edinburgh	18	Russia	Ivan Bessonov	Piano	Piano Concerto No. 1, 3rd mov. by Pyotr Ilyich Tchaikovsky
2022	23 July	(France) Montpellier	9	Czech Republic	Daniel Matejča	Violin	Violin Concerto No. 1, 3rd and 4th mov. by Dmitri Shostakovich
2024	17 August	(Norway) Bodø	11	Austria	Leonhard Baumgartner	Violin	Violin Concerto No. 5, 1st mov. by Henri Vieuxtemps
2026	6 June	(Armenia) Yerevan	11	Poland	Michał Stochel	Accordion	Concerto Classico, 3rd mov. by Mikołaj Majkusiak
2027	10 July	(Latvia) Liepāja					

=== By country ===
The table below shows the top-three placings from each contest, along with the years that a country won the contest.

Map showing each country's number of Young Musicians gold medal wins up to and including 2024.

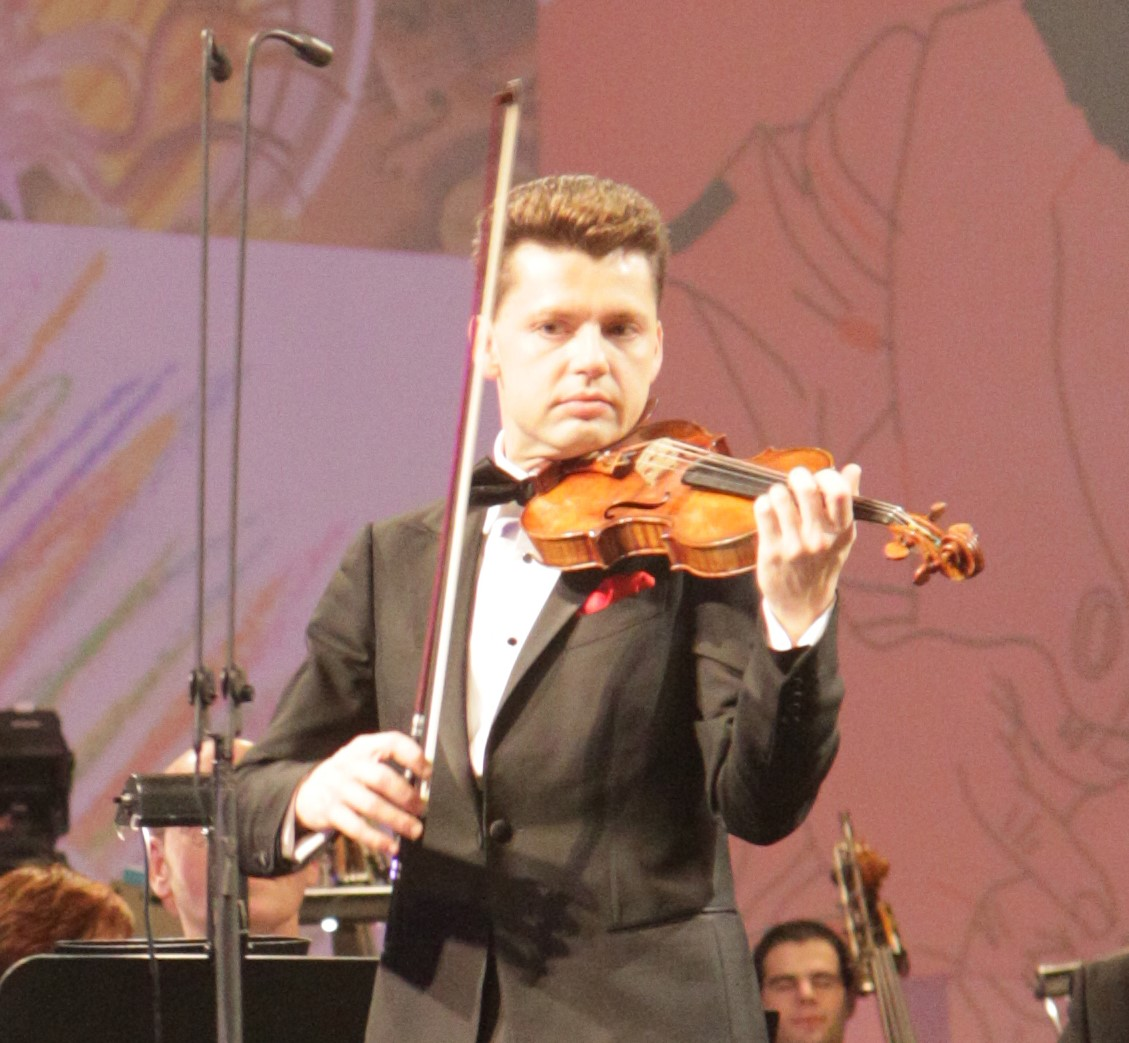
Violinist Julian Rachlin won the competition for Austria in 1988 and hosted in 1998.

Country	1st place, gold medalist(s)	2nd place, silver medalist(s)	3rd place, bronze medalist(s)	Total	Years won
Austria	6	2	1	9	1988; 1998; 2002; 2004; 2014; 2024
Poland	4	0	0	4	1992; 2000; 2016; 2026
Germany	2	2	1	5	1982; 1996
Netherlands	2	0	0	2	1984; 1990
Norway	1	3	2	6	2012
Slovenia	1	2	1	4	2010
United Kingdom	1	1	2	4	1994
France	1	1	0	2	1986
Czech Republic	1	1	0	2	2022
Russia	1	0	4	5	2018
Sweden	1	1	1	3	2006
Greece	1	0	0	1	2008
Finland	0	3	1	4	—N/a
Switzerland	0	1	1	2	—N/a
Croatia	0	1	0	1	—N/a
Latvia	0	2	0	2	—N/a
Spain	0	1	0	1	—N/a
Armenia	0	0	2	2	—N/a
Belgium	0	0	2	2	—N/a
Estonia	0	0	1	1	—N/a
Hungary	0	0	1	1	—N/a
Italy	0	0	1	1	—N/a

=== By instrument ===
As of 2026, twenty-six instruments have appeared at least once in the televised finals (preliminary rounds or semi finals are not included). The following seven have been played by a winner at least once.

Instrument	Family	Total	Years won
Violin	Strings	10	1984; 1988; 1992; 1996; 1998; 2002; 2004; 2014; 2022; 2024
Piano	Strings	5	1982; 1986; 1990; 2000; 2018
Cello	Strings	2	1994; 2006
Clarinet	Woodwind	1	2008
Flute	Woodwind	1	2010
Viola	Strings	1	2012
Saxophone	Woodwind	1	2016
Accordion	Keyboard	1	2026

== Presenters, conductors and orchestras ==
Year	Presenter(s)	Conductor	Orchestra
1982	Humphrey Burton	Bryden Thomson	BBC Northern Symphony Orchestra
1984	Georges Kleinmann	Horst Stein	Orchestre de la Suisse Romande
1986	Anette Faaborg	Hans Graf	Danish National Symphony Orchestra
1988	Martine Bijl	Sergiu Comissiona	Radio Filharmonisch Orkest
1990	Gerhard Tötschinger	Pinchas Steinberg	Vienna Radio Symphony Orchestra
1992	Marie-Françoise Renson	Ronald Zollman	National Orchestra of Belgium
1994	Unknown	Kazimierz Kord	Warsaw National Philharmonic Orchestra
1996	Unknown	Luis Izquierdo	Portuguese Symphony Orchestra
1998	Julian Rachlin	Dennis Russell Davies	Vienna Radio Symphony Orchestra
2000	Arild Erikstad	Simone Young	Bergen Philharmonic Orchestra
2002	Julia Fischer	Marek Janowski	Deutsches Symphonie-Orchester Berlin
2004	Christian Arming	Christian Arming	Lucerne Symphony Orchestra
2006	Schallbert Gilet	Christian Arming	Vienna Symphony
2008	Lidia Baich and Christoph Wagner-Trenkwitz	Aleksandar Markovic	Vienna Symphony
2010	Christoph Wagner-Trenkwitz	Cornelius Meister	Vienna Symphony
2012	Pia Strauss (semifinal) and Martin Grubinger (final)	Cornelius Meister	Vienna Symphony
2014	Sabine Heinrich	Kristiina Poska	WDR Symphony Orchestra Cologne
2016	Tamina Kallert and Daniel Hope	Clemens Schuldt	WDR Symphony Orchestra Cologne
2018	Petroc Trelawny with Josie d'Arby (final only)	Thomas Dausgaard	BBC Scottish Symphony Orchestra
2022	Judith Chaine and Vincent Delbushaye	Pierre Dumoussaud	Opéra Orchestre national Montpellier
2024	Silje Nordnes and Mona Berntsen	Eivind Aadland	Norwegian Radio Orchestra
2026	Hamlet Arakelyan and Hrachuhi Utmazyan	Eduard Topchjan	Armenian Philharmonic Orchestra

== See also ==
- BBC Young Musician
- Eurovision Young Dancers
