= Eurovision Young Musicians 2024 =

Eurovision Young Musicians contest

Coordinates: 67.2839°N 14.3910°E

Date and venue
- Final: 17 August 2024
- Venue: Stormen Concert Hall; Bodø, Norway

Organisation
- Organiser: European Broadcasting Union (EBU)

Production
- Host broadcaster: Norwegian Broadcasting Corporation (NRK)
- Director: Torstein Vegheim
- Executive producer: Anja Danielsen Stabell
- Musical director: Eivind Aadland
- Presenters: Silje Nordnes; Mona Berntsen

Participants
- Number of entries: 11
- Returning countries: Armenia; Serbia; Switzerland
- Non-returning countries: Croatia
- Participation map: Competing countries Countries that participated in the past but not in 2024

Vote
- Voting system: Each juror awards a mark from 1–10 to each performer based on specific criteria
- Winning musician: Austria; Leonhard Baumgartner

Eurovision Young Musicians 2024 was the 21st edition of Eurovision Young Musicians, held on 17 August 2024 at the Stormen Concert Hall in Bodø, Norway, and presented by Silje Nordnes and Mona Berntsen. It was organised by the European Broadcasting Union (EBU) and host broadcaster the Norwegian Broadcasting Corporation (NRK). The Norwegian Radio Orchestra conducted by Eivind Aadland accompanied all competing performers.

The winner was violinist Leonhard Baumgartner representing Austria, with cellist Hugo Svedberg representing Sweden placing second, and flautist Fabian Egger representing Germany placing third.

== Location ==
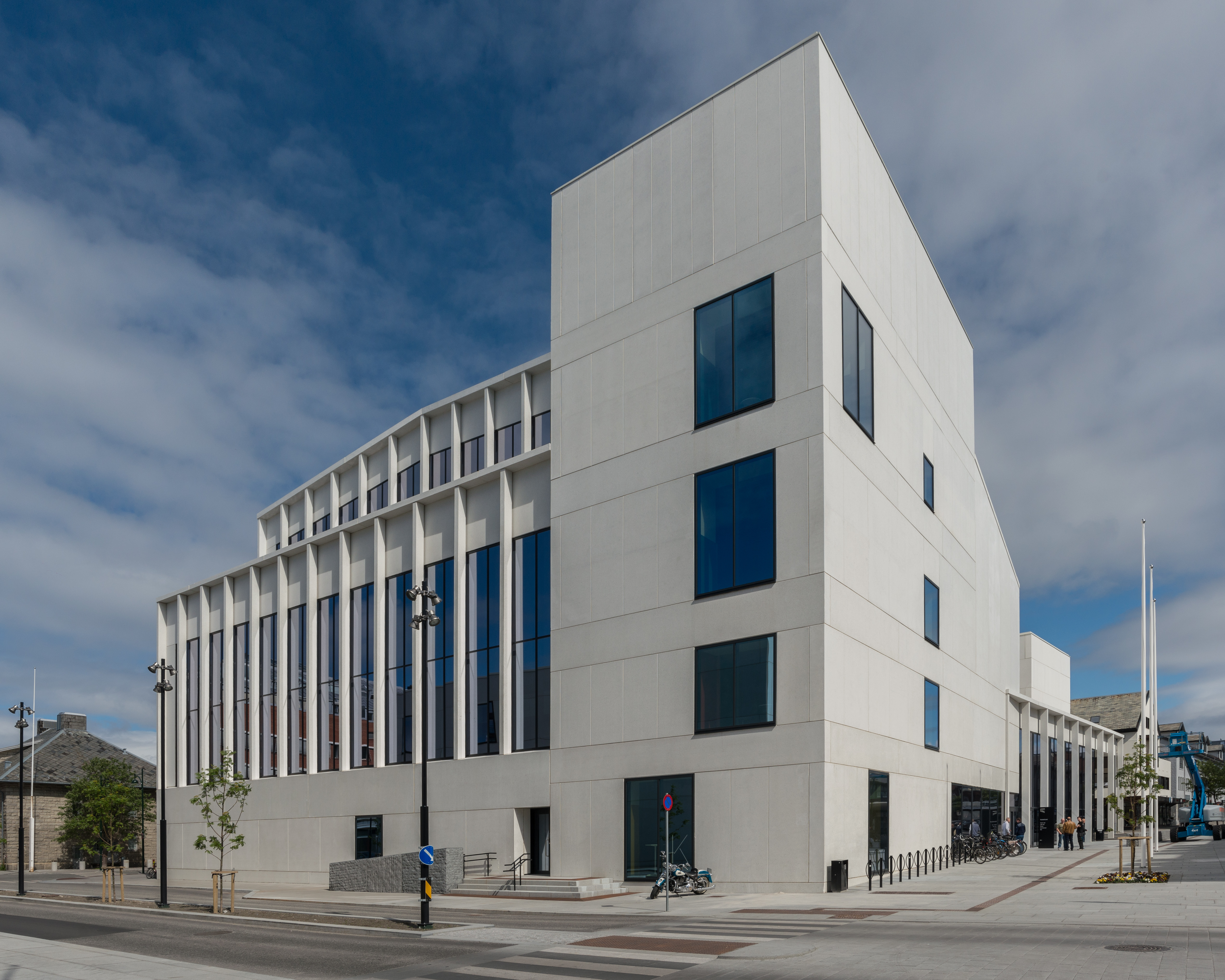
The contest was held at Stormen Concert Hall in Bodø, Norway

On 11 July 2023, the European Broadcasting Union announced on its official website that the contest would take place in the city of Bodø, Norway, during the city's role as European Capital of Culture. On Twitter, the organisation confirmed that Stormen Concert Hall has been chosen as the venue in which the competition would take place. This was the second edition organised in Norway since the first one in 2000, when it was held in Bergen.

== Format ==
The contest took place on 17 August 2024 at 21:00 CEST. Presenter Silje Nordnes and dancer Mona Berntsen were the hosts. The Norwegian Radio Orchestra conducted by Eivind Aadland accompanied all competing performers.

=== Jury members ===
The jurors of the competition were announced on 11 July 2024 in a press release by NRK. They were:

- Andreas Sundén, clarinetist
- Marianna Shirinyan, classical pianist
- Martin Grubinger, multi-percussionist, who was a finalist in 2000, presenter in 2012 and interval act at the Eurovision Song Contest 2015
- Tabita Berglund (chair), conductor and cellist

== Participants and results ==
Eleven countries participated in the contest. Armenia and Switzerland return to the contest after having last participated in 2012, and 2006, respectively. On their Facebook post in July 2023, the European Broadcasting Union announced there were ten participation slots available for broadcasters who wished to take part in the contest. However on 10 January 2024, the EBU's senior project manager and official representative for Eurovision Young Musicians Amelie Rossignol announced that a maximum of eleven countries may participate in 2024. There would be ten broadcasters from other countries alongside the host country's broadcaster. This marked the first time in which the number of participants in the contest would be limited. The EBU justified this step as a quality assurance measure for the event.

On 29 February 2024, Swiss broadcaster SRF revealed that twelve countries would take part in the contest, however, Austrian broadcaster ORF reported on 3 April 2024 that eleven countries will compete at the contest: Armenia, Austria, Belgium, Czechia, France, Germany, Norway, Poland, Serbia, Sweden and Switzerland, with Serbia returning to the contest for the first time since its only appearance in 2008. The list excludes Slovenia, which confirmed its intention on returning to the contest in June 2023. On 5 April 2024, Norwegian broadcaster Norsk Rikskringkasting officially revealed that eleven countries will participate, the same eleven countries that ORF reported two days prior.

Participants and results of Eurovision Young Musicians 2024
R/O	Country	Broadcaster	Performer	Instrument	Piece(s)	Composer(s)	Pl.	Ref.
1	Norway	NRK	Sebastian Egebakken Svenøy	Piano	Piano Concerto No. 5, 3rd movement	Camille Saint-Saëns		
2	Switzerland	SRF	Valerian Alfaré	Euphonium	Excerpt from Euphonium Concert	Paul Mealor		
3	Belgium	RTBF	Mahault Ska	Piano	Piano Concerto in G minor, 1st movement	Felix Mendelssohn		
4	Austria	ORF	Leonhard Baumgartner	Violin	Violin Concerto No. 5 in A minor, 1st movement	Henri Vieuxtemps	1	
5	Armenia	AMPTV	Hayk Hekekyan	Oboe	Oboe Concerto No. 1 in D minor, 1st movement	Ludwig August Lebrun		
6	France	France Télévisions	Pierre-Emmanuel Hurpeau	Piano	Piano Concerto in G, 3rd movement	Maurice Ravel		
7	Sweden	SVT	Hugo Svedberg	Cello	Cello Concerto No. 1 in D major, 1st movement	Joseph Haydn	2	
8	Poland	TVP	Jeremi Tabęcki	Clarinet	Concert Fantasia on motives from Rigoletto	Luigi Bassi		
9	Serbia	RTS	Bogdan Dugalić	Piano	Rhapsody on a Theme of Paganini	Sergei Rachmaninoff		
10	Germany	WDR	Fabian Egger	Flute	Tango Fantasia for flute and orchestra	Jacob Gade &; Toke Lund Christiansen	3	
11	Czechia	ČT	Adam Znamirovský	Piano	Piano Concerto No. 2, 3rd movement	Camille Saint-Saëns		

=== Other EBU members ===
Active EBU member broadcasters in Bulgaria, Georgia, the Netherlands, Spain, and Wales confirmed non-participation prior to the announcement of the participants list by the EBU, while Croatia opted to not return after taking part in the prior edition. Slovenia had announced its intention to return to the contest after an absence, but did not appear on the final list of participants. In late-December 2023, the BBC announced that the United Kingdom had no plans to return to the 2024 competition, as the BBC Young Musician contest was held at the same time as the final of Eurovision Young Musicians.

== Broadcasts ==
All participating broadcasters may choose to have on-site or remote commentators providing insight and voting information to their local audience. Some broadcasters aired the show "as live" on 17 August 2024 at 21:00 CEST, with others moving the broadcast to other time slots or other dates.

Broadcasters and commentators in participating countries
Country	Date of broadcast	Time	Channel(s)	Commentator(s)	Ref(s)
Armenia	17 August	Live	First Channel	Anna Avanesyan and Ruben Muradyan	
Belgium	17 August	Live	Musiq'3	Caroline Veyt	
Belgium	17 August	21:25 CEST	La Trois	Caroline Veyt	
Czechia	17 August	Live	ČT art	Jiří Vejvoda and Petra Křížková	
Germany	17 August	21:45 CEST	WDR Fernsehen, WDR 3	Daniel Finkernagel	
Norway	17 August	Live	NRK1	No commentary	
Norway	17 August	Live	NRK Klassisk	Anikken Sunde	
Poland	17 August	Live	TVP Kultura, TVP Kultura 2	Sylwia Janiak-Kobylińska and Robert Kamyk	
Serbia	17 August	Live	RTS 2, Radio Belgrade 3	Tijana Lukić	
Switzerland	17 August	22:45 CEST	SRF 1	Beatrice Kern	
Switzerland	17 August	23:30 CEST	RTS 2	Benoît Perrier	
Austria	18 August	22:10 CEST	ORF 2	Teresa Vogl	
Norway	19 August	21:10 CEST	NRK3	No commentary	
Sweden	24 August	19:10 CEST	SVT2	No commentary	
Sweden	25 August	10:40 CEST	SVT2	No commentary	
France	24 September	21:00 CEST	Culturebox	No commentary (Note: Broadcast dubbed in French by Aurore Bonjour, Laetitia Godes, Emmanuelle Kester, Marion Pasdeloup, Christophe Seugnet and Taric Mehani.)	
