= Eurovision Young Musicians 2004 =

International youth classical music contest

Dates and venue
- Semi-final 1: 22 May 2004
- Semi-final 2: 23 May 2004
- Final: 27 May 2004
- Venue: Culture and Congress Centre; Lucerne, Switzerland

Organisation
- Organiser: European Broadcasting Union (EBU)

Production
- Host broadcaster: Swiss Broadcasting Corporation (SRG SSR); Schweizer Fernsehen (SF DRS); Televisione svizzera di lingua italiana (TSI)
- Director: Mando Bernardinello
- Executive producer: Thomas Beck; Renzo Rota
- Musical director: Christian Arming
- Presenter: Christian Arming

Participants
- Number of entries: 17
- Number of finalists: 7
- Returning countries: Belgium
- Non-returning countries: Czech Republic; Denmark; Italy; Latvia
- Participation map: Finalist countries Countries eliminated in the preliminary round Countries that participated in the past but not in 2004

Vote
- Voting system: Jury chose their top 3 favourites by vote.
- Winning musician: Austria; Alexandra Soumm

Eurovision Young Musicians 2004 was the 12th edition of Eurovision Young Musicians. It consisted of two semi-finals on 22 and 23 May and a final on 27 May 2004, held at the Culture and Congress Centre in Lucerne, Switzerland, and presented by Christian Arming. It was organised by the European Broadcasting Union (EBU) and host broadcasters Schweizer Fernsehen (SF DRS) and Televisione svizzera di lingua italiana (TSI) on behalf of the Swiss Broadcasting Corporation (SRG SSR). The Lucerne Symphony Orchestra conducted by Christian Arming accompanied all competing performers. SRG SSR had previously hosted the contest in Switzerland in 1984.

Musicians representing seventeen countries took part in the competition, with seven of them participating in the televised final. Czech Republic, Denmark, Italy and Latvia decided not to participate, whilst Belgium returned. Albania was listed as the 18th participant, performing 9th at the first day of semi-finals, however in the end did not take part or broadcast the contest.

The winner was violinist Alexandra Soumm representing Austria, with saxophonist Koryun Asatryan representing Germany placing second, and pianist Dinara Nadzhafova representing Russia placing third.

== Location ==
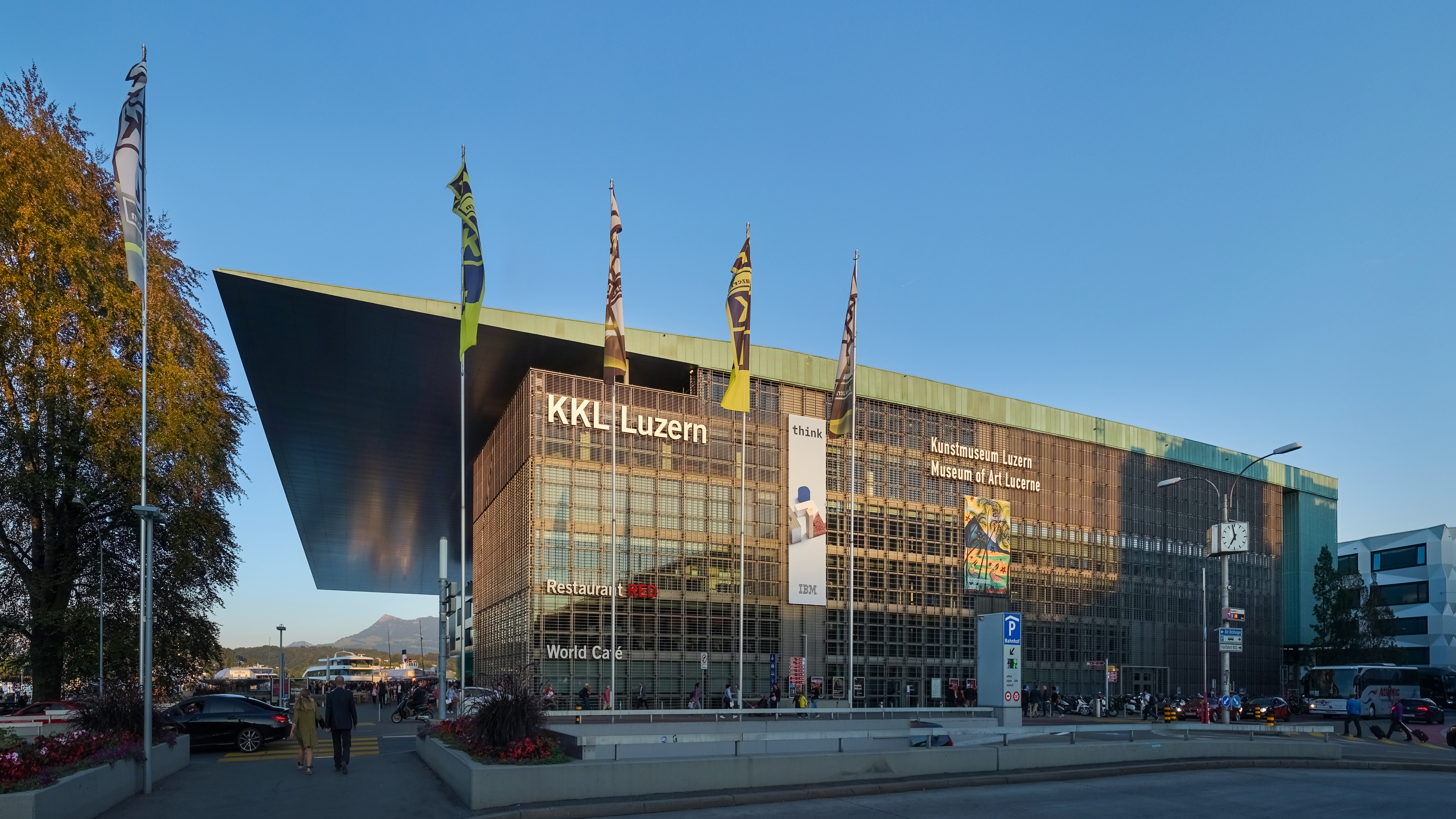
Culture and Congress Centre, Lucerne. Venue of Eurovision Young Musicians 2004.

Lucerne Culture and Congress Centre, was the host venue for the 2004 edition of Eurovision Young Musicians. It was built according to the plans of the architect Jean Nouvel and was inaugurated in 1998 with a concert by the Berlin Philharmonic Orchestra under the direction of Claudio Abbado.

For the week of the contest, a sound curtain was installed on the outer edge of the building's canopy to create a meeting concourse area; it uses technology to diffuse the sounds from the inside of the venue into the outside space.

== Format ==
Christian Arming was the host of the 2004 contest. For the first time, the host and the conductor was the same person.

== Participants and results ==
=== Preliminary round ===
Broadcasters from seventeen countries took part in the preliminary round of the 2004 contest, of which seven qualified to the televised grand final. The following participants failed to qualify.

Country	Broadcaster	Performer	Instrument
Belgium	RTBF, VRT	Philippe Ivanov	Piano
Croatia	HRT	Kajana Pačko	Cello
Cyprus	CyBC	Andreas Ioannides	Piano
Finland	Yle	Santtu-Matias Rouvali	Percussion
Greece	ERT	Joánna Gaitáni	Violin
Netherlands	NOS	Felicia van den End	Flute
Romania	TVR	Octavian Alin Lup	Cello
Slovenia	RTVSLO	Marina Golja	Marimba
Sweden	SVT	Andrej Power	Violin
United Kingdom	BBC	Nicola Benedetti	Violin

=== Final ===
Awards were given to the top three participants. The table below highlights these using gold, silver, and bronze. The placing results of the remaining participants is unknown and never made public by the European Broadcasting Union.

Participants and results
R/O	Country	Broadcaster	Performer(s)	Instrument	Piece(s)	Composer(s)	Pl.
1	Austria	ORF	Alexandra Soumm	Violin	Violin Concerto No.1, 1st Mov.	Niccolò Paganini	1
2	Germany	ZDF	Koryun Asatryan	Saxophone	Pequeña Czarda	Pedro Iturralde	2
3	Russia	RTR	Dinara Nadzhafova (Klinton)	Piano	Piano Concerto No.2, 3rd Mov.	Camille Saint-Saëns	3
4	Poland	TVP	Agnieszka Grzybowska	Percussion	Concerto for Marimba and Strings	Ney Rosauro	
5	Estonia	ERR	Jaan Kapp	Piano	Piano Concerto No.2, 3rd Mov.	Sergei Rachmaninoff	
6	Switzerland	SRG SSR	Giuliano Sommerhalder	Trumpet	Trumpet concerto No.2, 2nd and 3rd Movs.	André Jolivet	
7	Norway	NRK	Vilde Frang Bjærke	Violin	Violin Concerto, 3rd Mov.	Jean Sibelius	

== Jury members ==
The jury members consisted of the following:

- Switzerland – Michael Haefliger (head)
- United Kingdom – Harold Clarkson
- Romania – Mihaela Ursuleasa
- Italy – Bruno Giuranna
- Austria – Milan Turković
- United States/Canada – Harvey Sachs

== Broadcasting ==
The competition was transmitted live over the Eurovision Network by the participating broadcasters. The Final was also broadcast by the second channels of the Swiss radio stations and was also shown in Canada and Australia. Known details on the broadcasts in each country, including the specific broadcasting stations and commentators are shown in the tables below.

Broadcasters in participating countries
Country	Broadcaster	Channel(s)	Commentator(s)	Ref(s)
Austria	ORF			
Belgium	RTBF	La Deux		
Belgium	VRT			
Croatia	HRT			
Cyprus	CyBC			
Estonia	ERR			
Finland	Yle			
Germany	ZDF (Note: The contest was summarised in an edition of ...und morgen Weltstar? broadcast on 19 June at 0:20 CET)			
Greece	ERT			
Netherlands	NOS	Nederland 3 (Note: Delayed broadcast, in a shortened format, on 3 June at 00:25 CET (23:25 UTC))		
Norway	NRK	NRK1		
Poland	TVP			
Romania	TVR	TVR Cultural		
Russia	RTR			
Slovenia	RTVSLO			
Sweden	SVT	SVT1, SVT Europa (Note: Delayed broadcast on 5 June at 22:50 CET (21:50 UTC))	Marianne Söderberg	
Switzerland	SRG SSR	SF2, DRS 2		
Switzerland	SRG SSR	TSR 2	Flavia Matea	
United Kingdom	BBC	BBC Four (Note: Deferred broadcast on 31 May at 19:00)	Stephanie Hughes	

Broadcasters in non-participating countries
Country	Broadcaster
Australia	Unknown
Canada	Unknown
Czech Republic	ČT

== See also ==
- Eurovision Song Contest 2004
- Junior Eurovision Song Contest 2004
