= Eurovision Young Musicians 1996 =

International youth classical music contest

Date and venue
- Final: 12 June 1996
- Venue: Belém Cultural Center; Lisbon, Portugal

Organisation
- Organiser: European Broadcasting Union (EBU)
- Host broadcaster: Radiotelevisão Portuguesa (RTP)
- Musical director: Luis Izquierdo

Participants
- Number of entries: 22
- Number of finalists: 8
- Non-returning countries: Unknown (Note: The participation of six countries that took part in the previous edition is unknown (Croatia, Denmark, Hungary, Lithuania, Macedonia and Sweden))
- Participation map: Finalist countries Countries eliminated in the preliminary round Countries that participated in the past but not in 1996

Vote
- Voting system: Jury chose their top 3 favourites by vote.
- Winning musician: Germany; Julia Fischer

Eurovision Young Musicians 1996 was the 8th edition of Eurovision Young Musicians, held on 12 June 1996 at Belém Cultural Center in Lisbon, Portugal. It was organised by the European Broadcasting Union (EBU) and host broadcaster Radiotelevisão Portuguesa (RTP). The Portuguese Symphony Orchestra conducted by Luis Izquierdo accompanied all competing performers.

Musicians representing eight countries participated in the televised final. Out of the 22 countries (of which 18 are known), 14 (of which 10 are known) did not qualify to the final, including the host country Portugal. The participation of the following countries that took part in the previous edition is unknown; they are Croatia, Denmark, Hungary, Lithuania, Macedonia, and Sweden.

The winner was violinist Julia Fischer representing Germany, with violinist Lidia Baich representing Austria placing second, and pianist Hanna Heinmaa representing Estonia placing third.

== Location ==
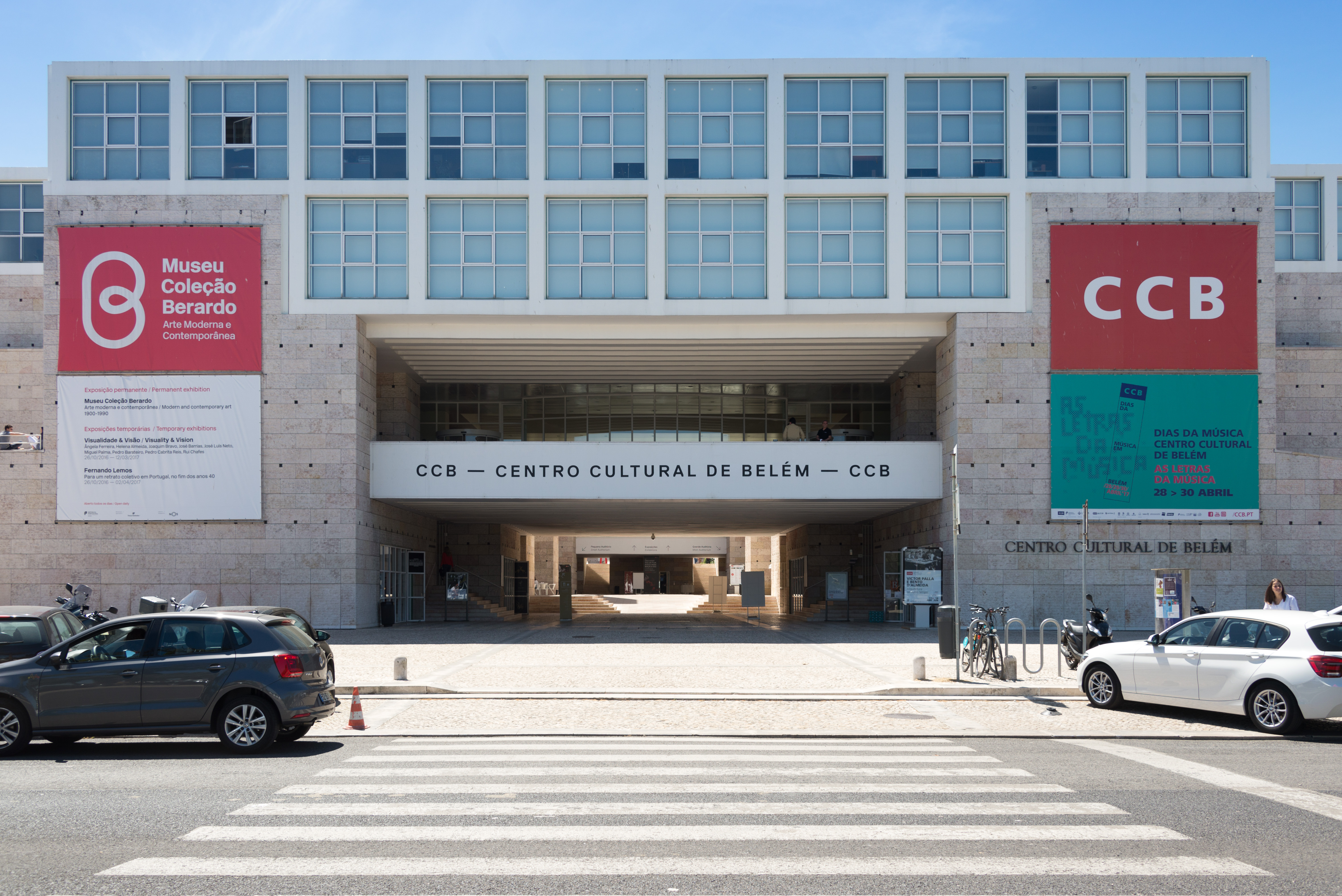
Belém Cultural Center, Lisbon. Venue of Eurovision Young Musicians 1996.

Belém Cultural Center (Portuguese: Centro Cultural de Belém), a cultural centre in Lisbon, Portugal, was the host venue for the 1996 edition of Eurovision Young Musicians.

Located in the civil parish of Santa Maria de Belém (in the municipality of Lisbon), it is the largest building with cultural facilities in Portugal. The CCB's 140,000 m^{2} spaces was initially built to accommodate the European Presidency, but adapted to provide spaces for conferences, exhibitions and artistic venues (such as opera, ballet and symphony concerts), in addition to political and research congresses, high security meeting halls, and a 7,000 m^{2} exhibition area.

== Participants and results ==
=== Preliminary round ===
Broadcasters from twenty-two countries took part in the preliminary round of the 1996 contest, of which eight qualified to the televised grand final. The official list of performers in the preliminary round is unknown; the following participants failed to qualify.

Country	Broadcaster	Performer	Instrument
Belgium	RTBF	David Cohen	Cello
Cyprus	CyBC	Manolis Neophytou	Piano
Finland	Yle	Jussi Makkonen	Cello
Greece	ERT	Angelos Liakakis	Cello
Ireland	RTÉ	Gerald Peregrine	Cello
Portugal	RTP (host)	Raquel Queirós	Violin
Russia	RTR	Unknown	Violin
Slovenia	RTVSLO	Gal Faganel	Cello
Spain	TVE	Maia Turullols	Piano
United Kingdom	BBC	Rafal Zambrzycki Payne	Violin

=== Final ===
Awards were given to the top three participants. The table below highlights these using gold, silver, and bronze. The placing results of the remaining participants is unknown and never made public by the European Broadcasting Union.

Participants and results
R/O	Country	Broadcaster	Performer(s)	Instrument	Piece(s)	Composer(s)	Pl.
1	Norway	NRK	Gunilla Süssmann	Piano	Unknown		
2	Switzerland	SRG SSR	Antoine Rebstein	Piano	Piano Concerto No. 1	Sergei Prokofiev	
3	Poland	TVP	Maria Nowak	Violin	Unknown		
4	Latvia	LTV	Baiba Skride	Violin	Violin Concerto	Jean Sibelius	
5	France	France Télévisions	Fanny Clamagirand	Violin	Carmen Fantasy	Pablo de Sarasate	
6	Austria	ORF	Lidia Baich	Violin	Violin Concerto No. 5, 1st mvt	Henri Vieuxtemps	2
7	Estonia	ETV	Hanna Heinmaa	Piano	Concerto for Piano and Orchestra in F major	Wolfgang Amadeus Mozart	3
8	Germany	ZDF	Julia Fischer	Violin	Havanaise in E major, op. 83	Camille Saint-Saëns	1

== Broadcasts ==
EBU members from the following countries broadcast the final round. Known details on the broadcasts in each country, including the specific broadcasting stations and commentators are shown in the tables below.

Broadcasters in participating countries
Country	Broadcaster	Channel(s)	Commentator(s)	Ref(s)
Austria	ORF	ORF 1 (Note: Delayed broadcast in a shortened format on 15 June at 12:05 (CEST))		
Belgium	RTBF	Télé 21	Benoît Jacques de Dixmude	
Cyprus	CyBC	RIK 2	Elli Korai Gerolemou	
Estonia	ETV (Note: Delayed broadcast on 20 June at 21:30 (EET))			
Finland	YLE	TV1		
France	France Télévision	France 3 (Note: Delayed broadcast in a shortened format on 29 June at 00:10 CET (23:10 UTC))		
Germany	ZDF (Note: Delayed broadcast on 13 June at 00:10 (CET))		Antonia Ronnewinkel	
Greece	ERT			
Ireland	RTÉ	Network 2 (Note: Delayed broadcast on 24 August)		
Latvia	LTV	LTV1		
Norway	NRK	NRK Fjernsynet (Note: Delayed broadcast in a shortened format on 24 June at 22:15 (CET))	Eyvind Solås	
Portugal	RTP	RTP2		
Poland	TVP	TVP2		
Russia	RTR			
Slovenia	RTVSLO	SLO 2		
Spain	TVE			
Switzerland	SRG SSR	Schweiz 4		
Switzerland	SRG SSR	Suisse 4	Jean-Pierre Pastori	
United Kingdom	BBC	BBC2 (Note: Delayed broadcast on 29 June at 13:10 UTC)	Sarah Walker	

Broadcasters in other countries
Country	Broadcaster	Channel(s)	Commentator(s)	Ref(s)
Denmark	DR	DR TV (Note: Delayed broadcast on 15 June at 16:01 CET (15:01 UTC), the second part was broadcast the following day at 23:07 CET (22:07 UTC))	Niels Oxenvad	
Iceland	RÚV	Rás 1 (Note: Delayed broadcast on 2 January 1997 at 20:00 WET (21:00 UTC))	Bergljót Anna Haraldsdóttir	
Sweden	SVT	SVT2 (Note: Delayed broadcast on 23 June at 18:00 CET (19:00 UTC))	Marianne Söderberg	

== See also ==
- Eurovision Song Contest 1996
