= Eurovision Young Musicians 2000 =

Music competition edition

Dates and venues
- Semi-final 1: 10 June 2000
- Semi-final 2: 11 June 2000; Sævigsalen Bergen, Norway
- Final: 15 June 2000; Grieg Hall Bergen, Norway

Organisation
- Organiser: European Broadcasting Union (EBU)

Production
- Host broadcaster: Norsk rikskringkasting (NRK)
- Director: Torstein Vegheim
- Executive producer: Anne Rothing
- Musical director: Simone Young
- Presenter: Arild Erikstad

Participants
- Number of entries: 24
- Number of finalists: 8
- Debuting countries: Czech Republic; Turkey
- Returning countries: Belgium; France; Hungary; Netherlands; Russia
- Non-returning countries: Portugal; Slovakia
- Participation map: frameless}} Finalist countries Countries eliminated in the preliminary round Countries that participated in the past but not in 2000

Vote
- Voting system: Jury chose their top 3 favourites by vote.
- Winning musician: Poland; Stanisław Drzewiecki

Eurovision Young Musicians 2000 was the 10th edition of Eurovision Young Musicians. It consisted of two semi-finals on 10 and 11 June, held at Sævigsalen, and a final on 15 June 2000, held at Grieg Hall in Bergen, Norway, and presented by Arild Erikstad. It was organised by the European Broadcasting Union (EBU) and host broadcaster Norsk rikskringkasting (NRK). The Bergen Philharmonic Orchestra conducted by Simone Young accompanied all competing performers.

Musicians representing twenty-four countries took part in the competition, with eight of them participating in the televised final. Five countries returned to the contest, whilst Czech Republic and Turkey made their debut. This was Turkey's first, and to date only, participation in any of the Eurovision family of events besides the flagship Eurovision Song Contest.

The winner was pianist Stanisław Drzewiecki representing Poland, with cellist Timo-Veikko Valve representing Finland placing second, and pianist Nikolai Tokarev representing Russia placing third.

== Location ==
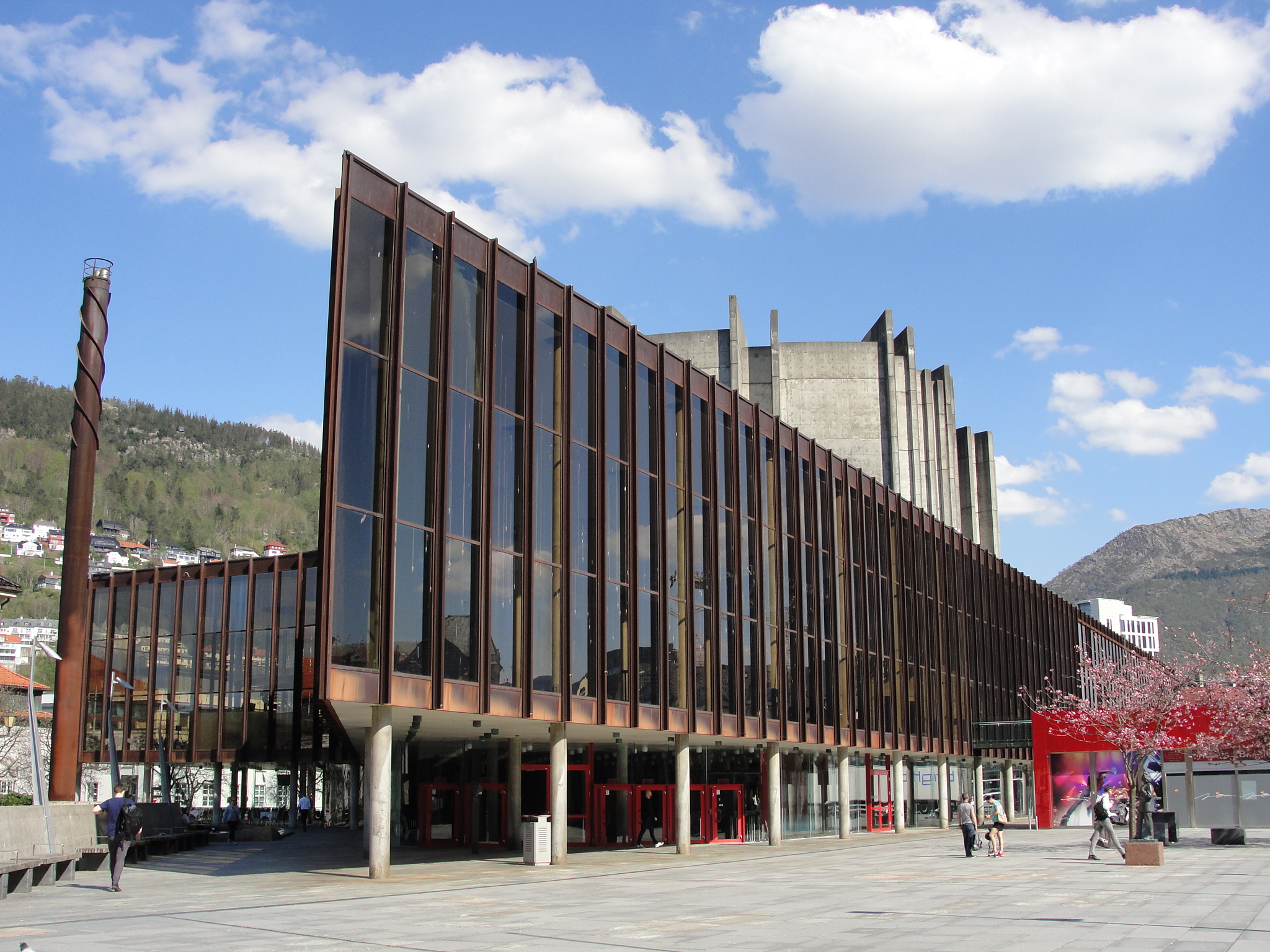
Grieg Hall, Bergen. Venue of Eurovision Young Musicians 2000.

The Grieg Hall (Norwegian: Grieghallen), a 1,500-seat concert hall in Bergen, Norway, was the host venue for the 2000 edition of Eurovision Young Musicians. It has been the home of the Bergen Philharmonic Orchestra since the hall's completion in 1978.

It hosted the Eurovision Song Contest 1986, and is the host of the annual Norwegian Brass Band Championship competition, which occurs in mid-winter. The hall is named after Bergen-born composer Edvard Grieg, who was music director of the Bergen Philharmonic Orchestra from 1880 until 1882.

== Format ==
Arild Erikstad was the host of the 2000 contest. Norwegian jazz band The Brazz Brothers performed during the interval.

== Participants and results ==
=== Preliminary round ===
Broadcasters from twenty-four countries took part in the preliminary round of the 2000 contest, of which eight qualified to the televised grand final. The following participants failed to qualify.

Country	Broadcaster	Performer	Instrument
Belgium	RTBF, VRT (Note: Both RTBF and VRT broadcast the contest and, as EBU member broadcasters, both were eligible to participate, but it is not known whether this was a joint entry or just an entry of one of them.)	Yossif Ivanov	Violin
Croatia	HRT	Jan Jankovic	Horn
Cyprus	CyBC	Roman Kariolou	Violin
Czech Republic	ČT	Monika Vavrinková	Violin
Denmark	DR	Andrea Gyarfas	Violin
Estonia	ETV	Anna-Liisa Bezrodny	Violin
Germany	ZDF	Martin Helmchen	Piano
Greece	ERT	Theodorou Andreas-Polandos	Trombone
Ireland	RTÉ	Rebecca Cap	Piano
Latvia	LTV	Ieva Rutentale	Flute
Slovenia	RTVSLO	Kristijan Krajncan	Cello
Spain	TVE	Elena Mikhailova Pogosova	Violin
Sweden	SVT	David Gammelgård	Cello
Switzerland	SRG SSR	Nathalie Amstutz	Harp
Turkey	TRT	Ayşedeniz Gökçin	Piano
United Kingdom	BBC	Guy Johnston	Cello

=== Final ===
Awards were given to the top three participants. The table below highlights these using gold, silver, and bronze. The placing results of the remaining participants is unknown and never made public by the European Broadcasting Union.

Participants and results
R/O	Country	Broadcaster	Performer(s)	Instrument	Piece(s)	Composer(s)	Pl.
1	Austria	ORF	Martin Grubinger	Percussion	Canis Familiaris (Concertino fuer Schlagwerksolo und Orchester, op. 23)	Bruno Hartl	
2	Poland	TVP	Stanisław Drzewiecki	Piano	Piano Concerto No. 1, op. 11, 3rd Mov.	Frederic Chopin	1
3	Hungary	MTV	Ödön Rácz	Contrabass	Gran fantasia sulla Lucia di Lammermoor per contrabasso ed orchestra	Giovanni Bottesini	
4	France	France Télévision	David Guerrier	Trumpet	Concertino pour trompette	Andre Jolivet	
5	Norway	NRK	David Coucheron	Violin	Carmen Fantasie	Franz Waxman	
6	Finland	YLE	Timo-Veikko Valve	Cello	Rondo for Cello and Orchestra, op. 94	Anton Dvorak	2
7	Netherlands	NOS	Gwyneth Joyce Wentink	Harp	Harp Concerto, op. 25, 3rd Mov.	Alberto Ginastera	
8	Russia	RTR	Nikolai Tokarev	Piano	Piano Concerto No. 1	Peter Tchaikovsky	3

== Jury members ==
The jury members consisted of the following:

- Finland – Esa-Pekka Salonen
- United States – Michael Thompson
- Hungary – Beata Schanda
- United Kingdom – Michael Collins
- Austria – Boris Kuschnir
- United Kingdom – Evelyn Glennie
- Norway – Leif Ove Andsnes

== Broadcasting ==
EBU members from the following countries broadcast the final round. Known details on the broadcasts in each country, including the specific broadcasting stations and commentators are shown in the tables below.

Broadcasters in participating countries
Country	Broadcaster	Channel(s)	Commentator(s)	Ref.
Austria	ORF	ORF 2 (Note: Delayed broadcast in a shortened format on 18 June at 09:05 CET (08:05 UTC))		
Belgium	RTBF	La Deux (Note: Delayed broadcast on 29 June at 20:30 CET (19:30 UTC))		
Belgium	VRT			
Croatia	HRT			
Cyprus	CyBC	RIK Dyo		
Czech Republic	ČT	ČT2 (Note: Delayed broadcast on 5 August)		
Denmark	DR	DR2 (Note: Delayed broadcast on 2 September at 18:02 CET (17:02 UTC), the second part was broadcast next Saturday on 18:11 CET (17:11 UTC))	Lars Søgaard	
Estonia	ERR	ETV (Note: Delayed broadcast on 16 June at 22:40 EEST (19:40 UTC))	Eero Raun	
Finland	YLE	TV1		
France	France Télévision	France 3 (Note: Delayed broadcast on 30 October at 1:50 CEST (0:50 UTC))		
Germany	ZDF (Note: The contest was summarised in an edition of ...und morgen Weltstar? broadcast on 3 July at 00:00 CET)			
Greece	ERT			
Hungary	MTV			
Ireland	RTÉ			
Latvia	LTV	LTV1 (Note: Delayed broadcast on 17 June)		
Netherlands	NOS	Nederland 3	Bo van der Meulen	
Norway	NRK	NRK1, NRK P2	No commentator	
Poland	TVP	TVP2 (Note: Delayed broadcast in a shortened format on 4 July at 19:30)		
Russia	RTR			
Slovenia	RTVSLO			
Spain	TVE			
Sweden	SVT	SVT1 (Note: Delayed broadcast on 24 June at 22:05 CET (21:05 UTC))	Marianne Söderberg	
Switzerland	SRG SSR	DRS 2 (Note: Delayed broadcast on 2 July at 15:05 CET (14:05 UTC))		
Switzerland	SRG SSR	TSR 2 (Note: Deferred broadcast at 22:50 CET (21:50 UTC))		
Turkey	TRT			
United Kingdom	BBC	BBC Two (Note: Delayed broadcast on 29 July at 15:10 UTC)	Stephanie Hughes	

== See also ==
- Eurovision Song Contest 2000
