= Kiron Atom Tellian =

Austrian pianist and composer (born 2002)

Kiron Atom Tellian (born 2002) is an Austrian pianist and composer. Born in Vienna, he trained at the University of Music and Performing Arts Vienna and The Juilliard School, and in 2024 won first prize at the Young Concert Artists Susan Wadsworth International Auditions. He has appeared as a concerto soloist with the Orchestra Sinfonica di Milano under Emmanuel Tjeknavorian and as a recitalist in Europe and the United States, including at Carnegie Hall and the Kennedy Center.

== Early life and education ==
Tellian was born in Vienna; part of his family is of Armenian heritage. He began studying the piano at the University of Music and Performing Arts Vienna at the age of seven and made his orchestral debut at nine. His playing and early compositions drew notice in the Austrian and German regional press from his teens. As a child he was admitted to the university's preparatory program for highly gifted young students and paired piano with studies in composition.

He went on to enroll at The Juilliard School in New York, where he held the Kovner Fellowship and studied with the pianist Sergei Babayan. He later studied with Emanuel Ax and completed his bachelor's degree at Juilliard.

== Career ==
Tellian has performed chamber music with the violinist Emmanuel Tjeknavorian; in 2021 the two appeared at a foyer concert of the Festspiele Mecklenburg-Vorpommern in Greifswald, and the same year Tellian played in a piano trio with Tjeknavorian and the cellist Jeremias Fliedl. In 2022 he gave a solo recital at the Sendesaal in Bremen, with a program including Schubert's Wanderer Fantasy; the Weser-Kurier praised his playing for combining "weightless elegance" with "almost explosive" force. In 2023 he appeared at the Verbier Festival in Switzerland in both solo and chamber programs. He has appeared at the Wiener Konzerthaus in Vienna, and in August 2025, by invitation of the Sergei Rachmaninoff Foundation, he performed at Villa Senar, Rachmaninoff's former residence near Lucerne.

Tellian has twice appeared as a concerto soloist with the Orchestra Sinfonica di Milano under Emmanuel Tjeknavorian. In November 2024 he was the soloist in Chopin's Piano Concerto No. 1 at the orchestra's Auditorium di Milano. In May 2026 he performed Liszt's Piano Concerto No. 2 and Rachmaninoff's Piano Concerto No. 2 with the orchestra on a tour that included Graz and Salzburg, where the Salzburger Nachrichten described him as "a new star ... in the pianistic firmament".

In North America, Tellian was the soloist with the El Paso Symphony Orchestra in April 2025, and in August 2025 he made his debut with the San Diego Symphony at the Rady Shell, performing Chopin's Piano Concerto No. 1 under Stephanie Childress to a sold-out audience. On 1 January 2026 he was the piano soloist in the Salzburg Philharmonic's New Year's Concert at the Großes Festspielhaus, conducted by Elisabeth Fuchs.

In October 2025, presented by Carnegie Hall, Tellian gave a solo recital in Zankel Hall at Carnegie Hall, in a program of études by Chopin, Scriabin and Schumann. In April 2026, presented by Young Concert Artists, he gave the same program in the Terrace Theater of the Kennedy Center in Washington, D.C.

Announced engagements for the 2026–27 season include a chamber recital with Tjeknavorian at the Teatro Cultura Artística in São Paulo in August 2026, a solo recital at the Musikverein in Vienna in May 2027, and concerto appearances under Tjeknavorian with the Orchestre National de Lyon, the Antwerp Symphony Orchestra and the Dallas Symphony Orchestra.

=== Composition ===
Tellian is also active as a composer. In March 2025 his work received its world premiere from the Wiener Concert-Verein, conducted by Anna Rakitina, at the Musikverein in Vienna.

== Competitions and awards ==
In 2024, Tellian won first prize at the Young Concert Artists Susan Wadsworth International Auditions, together with eight special prizes.

His earlier competition results include:

- Alexei Sultanov Memorial Discovery Grand Prize at the Nashville International Chopin Competition (2023), along with prizes for best mazurka and best étude.
- First prize and the Haydn Prize at the 17th Ettlingen International Piano Competition.
- Top prizes in three categories at the Rosalyn Tureck International Bach Competition in New York.
- Grand prize at the Borderland Chopin International Competition (2024).
