= Eurovision Young Musicians 1984 =

International youth classical music contest

Date and venue
- Final: 22 May 1984
- Venue: Victoria Hall; Geneva, Switzerland

Organisation
- Organiser: European Broadcasting Union (EBU)
- Executive supervisor: Frank Naef

Production
- Host broadcaster: Swiss Broadcasting Corporation (SRG SSR); Télévision suisse romande (TSR)
- Executive producer: Eric Bauer
- Musical director: Horst Stein
- Presenter: Georges Kleinmann

Participants
- Number of entries: 7 (Note: For a second time, the Nordic broadcasters (those from Denmark, Norway, Finland, and Sweden) sent a joint participant, this year from Finland. In the competition, the musician represented the Finnish colors.)
- Debuting countries: Finland; Netherlands
- Non-returning countries: Norway
- Participation map: Competing countries Countries that participated in the past but not in 1984

Vote
- Voting system: Jury chose their top 3 favourites by vote.
- Winning musician: Netherlands; Isabelle van Keulen

Eurovision Young Musicians 1984 was the 2nd edition of Eurovision Young Musicians, held on 22 May 1984 at the Victoria Hall in Geneva, Switzerland, and presented by Georges Kleinmann. It was organised by the European Broadcasting Union (EBU) and host broadcaster Télévision suisse romande (TSR) on behalf of the Swiss Broadcasting Corporation (SRG SSR). The Roman Swiss Orchestra, conducted by Horst Stein accompanied all competing performers.

Seven musicians representing ten countries participated in the contest. Musicians could not be older than 19 years of age. The Netherlands made its début. Finland, which also appeared on stage for the first time, as the previous year it was represented by Norway, jointly represented Denmark, Norway, Finland, and Sweden.

The winner was violinist Isabelle van Keulen representing the Netherlands, with pianist Olli Mustonen representing Finland placing second, and clarinetist Emma Johnson representing the United Kingdom placing third.

== Location ==
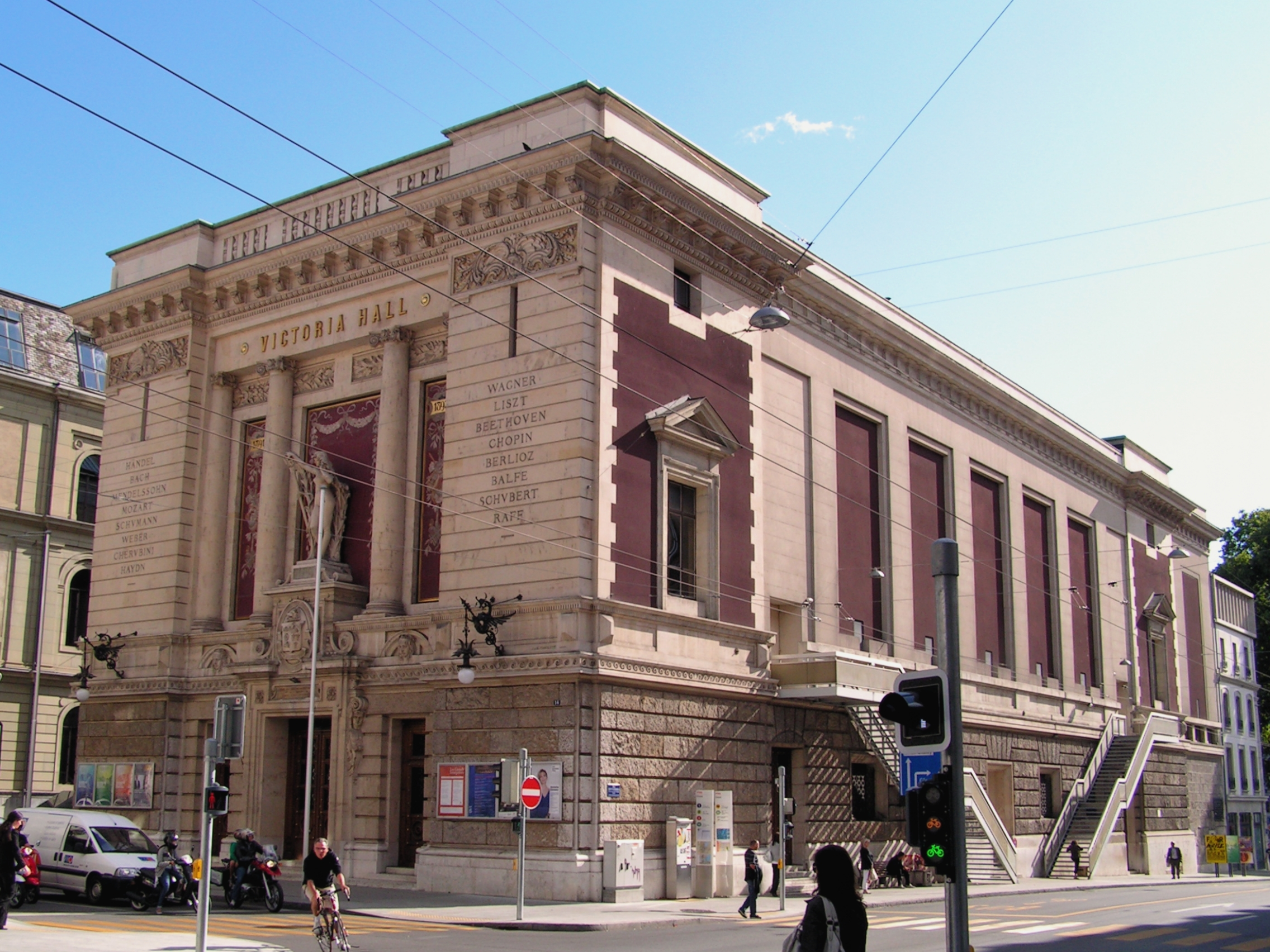
Victoria Hall, Geneva. Venue of Eurovision Young Musicians 1984.

The Victoria Hall in Geneva, Switzerland, was the host venue for the 1984 edition of Eurovision Young Musicians.

The concert hall located in downtown Geneva was built between 1891 and 1894 by the architect John Camoletti and financed by the consul of England, Daniel Fitzgerald Packenham Barton, who dedicated it to Queen Victoria and gave it to the city of Geneva. Currently, the Victoria Hall is mostly used for classical music performances.

== Format ==
Georges Kleinmann was the host of the 1984 contest. Each participating country were able to send male or female artists who were no older than 19 years of age, to represent them by playing a classical piece of their choice. They were all accompanied by the Roman Swiss Orchestra, which was conducted by Horst Stein. The winner received a cash prize of £1,000.

== Participants and results ==
Awards were given to the top three countries. The table below highlights these using gold, silver, and bronze. The placing results of the remaining participants are unknown and never made public by the European Broadcasting Union.

Participants and results
| R/O | Country | Broadcaster | Performer(s) | Instrument | Piece(s) | Composer(s) | Pl. |
|---|---|---|---|---|---|---|---|
| 1 | France | FR3 | Sabine Toutain | Viola | Viola concerto in D major | Karl Stamitz | |
| 2 | United Kingdom | BBC | Emma Johnson | Clarinet | Clarinet concerto No.2 in F-minor, Op.5, 2nd and 3rd Movs. | Bernhard Henrik Crusell | 3 |
| 3 | Germany | ZDF | Andreas Bach | Piano | Piano Concerto No. 1 | Franz Liszt | |
| 4 | Netherlands | NOS | Isabelle van Keulen | Violin | Violin Concerto No. 5 | Henri Vieuxtemps | 1 |
| 5 | Switzerland | SRG SSR | Martina Schuchen | Cello | Cello Concerto No. 1 | Camille Saint-Saëns | |
| 6 | Austria | ORF | Ghislaine Fleischmann | Violin | Violin Concerto, 3rd Mov. | Anton Dvorak | |
| 7 | Finland | DR; NRK; YLE; SVT | Olli Mustonen | Piano | Piano Concerto in G major | Maurice Ravel | 2 |

== Jury members ==
The jury members consisted of the following:

- Austria – Gottfried Scholz
- Finland – Juhani Raiskinen
- France – Marius Constant
- France – Pierre Fournier
- Germany – Werner Thärichen
- Netherlands – Jan Stulen (Note: Stulen served as musical director for the Eurovision Song Contest 1976)
- Switzerland – Aurèle Nicolet
- Switzerland – Éric Tappy
- Switzerland – Karl Engel
- Switzerland – Pierre Métral
- United Kingdom – Alun Hoddinott
- United States – Yehudi Menuhin (head juror)
- United States – Carole Dawn Reinhart

== Broadcasts ==
EBU members from the following countries broadcast the contest. Belgium and Yugoslavia broadcast the contest in addition to the competing countries. Known details on the broadcasts in each country, including the specific broadcasting stations and commentators are shown in the tables below.

Broadcasters in participating countries
| Country | Broadcaster | Channel(s) | Commentator(s) | Ref(s) |
|---|---|---|---|---|
| Austria | ORF | FS2 (Note: Delayed broadcast at 21:45 (CET)) | Andrea Seebohm | |
| Denmark | DR | DR TV, DR P2 | Niels Karl Nielsen | |
| France | FR3 (Note: Delayed broadcast on 27 May at 15:20 (CET)) | | Charles Imbert | |
| Germany | ZDF (Note: Deferred broadcast at 22:05 (CET)) | | | |
| Netherlands | NOS | Nederland 2, Hilversum 4 | Joop van Zijl | |
| Sweden | SVT | TV1 | | |
| Sweden | RR | SR P2 | | |
| Switzerland | SRG SSR | TSR, RSR 2 | Madeleine and Georges Kleinmann | |
| Switzerland | SRG SSR | TV DRS (Note: Broadcast through a second audio programme on TSR) | | |
| Switzerland | SRG SSR | TSI | | |
| United Kingdom | BBC | BBC2 | Humphrey Burton and Jane Glover | |

Broadcasters in non-participating countries
| Country | Broadcaster | Channel(s) | Commentator(s) | Ref(s) |
|---|---|---|---|---|
| Belgium | RTBF | Télé 2 | Georges Dumortier | |
| Yugoslavia | JRT | | | |

== See also ==
- Eurovision Song Contest 1984
