= Eurovision Young Musicians 2012 =

International youth classical music contest

Dates and venues
- Semi-final 1: 5 May 2012
- Semi-final 2: 6 May 2012; Schubert Hall Vienna, Austria
- Final: 11 May 2012; Rathausplatz Vienna, Austria

Organisation
- Organiser: European Broadcasting Union (EBU)
- Executive supervisor: Vladislav Yakovlev
- Host broadcaster: Österreichischer Rundfunk (ORF)
- Musical director: Cornelius Meister
- Presenters: Pia Strauss (Semi-finals); Martin Grubinger (Final)

Participants
- Number of entries: 14
- Number of finalists: 7
- Debuting countries: Armenia; Bosnia and Herzegovina; Georgia
- Returning countries: Ukraine
- Non-returning countries: Cyprus; Romania; Russia; Sweden; United Kingdom
- Participation map: Finalist countries Countries eliminated in the semi-final Countries that participated in the past but not in 2012

Vote
- Voting system: A jury selects the winner, runner-up, and third place
- Winning musician: Norway; Eivind Ringstad

Eurovision Young Musicians 2012 was the 16th edition of Eurovision Young Musicians. It consisted of two semi-finals on 5 and 6 May, held at the Schubert Hall and presented by Pia Strauss, and a final on 11 May 2012, held at the Rathausplatz in Vienna, Austria, and preseented by Martin Grubinger. It was organised by the European Broadcasting Union (EBU) and host broadcaster Österreichischer Rundfunk (ORF). The Vienna Symphony Orchestra conducted by Cornelius Meister accompanied all competing performers. This was the fourth time that the competition was held on an open-air stage and during the annual Vienna Festival. ORF had previously hosted the contest in Austria in 1990, 1998, 2006, 2008, and 2010.

Musicians representing fourteen countries took part in the competition, with seven of them participating in the televised final. Armenia, Bosnia and Herzegovina, and Georgia made their début while Ukraine returned. Five countries decided not to participate, they were Cyprus, Romania, Russia, Sweden, and United Kingdom.

The winner was violists Eivind Ringstad representing Norway, with violinist Emmanuel Tjeknavorian representing Austria placing second, and kanon player Narek Kazazyan representing Armenia placing third. Ringstad is the first viola player to win the competition.

== Location ==
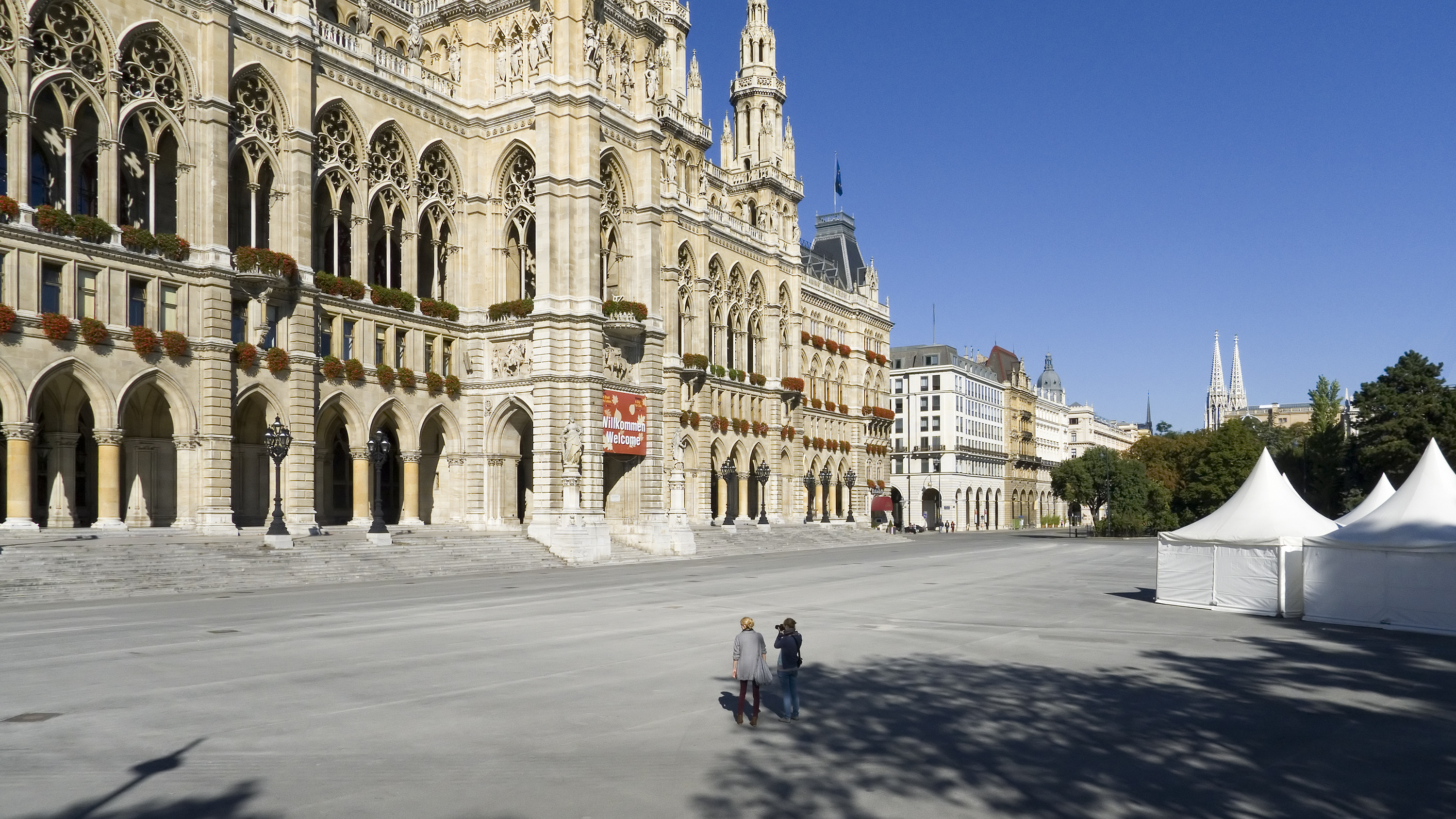
Rathausplatz, Vienna. Host location of the Eurovision Young Musicians 2012 final.

Rathausplatz, a square outside the Wiener Rathaus city hall of Vienna, was the host location for the 2012 edition of the Eurovision Young Musicians final. The Schubert Hall in Vienna, Austria, hosted the semi-final round.

== Format ==
Martin Grubinger was the host of the 2010 contest final, with Pia Strauss hosting the semi-final round.

Mnozil Brass, Vienna’s slapstick brass septet, together with the Vienna Radio Symphony Orchestra under Cornelius Meister, opened the concert with their version of Rossini’s William Tell Overture. Grubinger and his band, the Percussive Planet Ensemble performed during the interval.

== Participants and results ==
Broadcasters from fourteen countries participated this year in the Eurovision Young Musicians competition.

The semifinal was held in two parts. The first part was held on 5 May 2012 and the second on 6 May 2012. The seven best were selected by an international jury to perform live as finalists in the final that was held on 11 May 2012.

=== Returning artist ===
Lizi Ramishvili of Georgia previously competed in the Junior Eurovision Song Contest 2009 as part of Princesses, where she was the band's cellist.

=== Semi-final ===
==== Part 1 (5 May 2012) ====
R/O	Country	Broadcaster	Performer	Instrument	Piece(s)	R.
1	Slovenia	RTVSLO	Blaž Šparovec	Clarinet	1) Premiere Rhapsodie by Claude Debussy; 2) Clair 1 by Franco Donatoni	—N/a
2	Georgia	GPB	Lizi Ramishvili	Cello	1) Largo by Veracini; 2) Variations on One String by Paganini; 3) Flight of the Bumblebee by Rimsky-Korsakov	—N/a
3	Bosnia and Herzegovina	BHRT	Naomi Druškić	Piano	1) Vanished Days, op57, No.1 by Edvard Grieg; 2) Toccata, in E flat minor by Aram Khachaturian	—N/a
4	Czech Republic	ČT	Michaela Špačková	Bassoon	1) Concerto for Bassoon No.2 f-moll, the first and the second movement by Ludwig Milde; 2) Recitative, Sicilliene et Rondo (1905-1991) by Eugéne Bozza	Q
5	Armenia	ARMTV	Narek Kazazyan	Kanon	1) “Impromptu” op. 57 in b-minor by Tsovinar Hovhannisyan; 2) Carnival in Venice by Niccolo Paganini / arranged for kanun and piano by Alexander Shahbazyan; 3) “Perpetual Motion” op.69 in a-minor by Khachatur Avetisyan	Q
6	Austria	ORF	Emmanuel Tjeknavorian	Violin	1) Scherzo for Violin and Piano in C minor by Johannes Brahms; 2) Tzigane, Rapsodie de Concert for Violin and Piano by Maurice Ravel	Q
7	Greece	ERT	Zacharias Fotis	Clarinet	1) Concerto, K 622, 2nd mov. Adagio by Wolfgang Amadeus Mozart	—N/a
8	Croatia	HRT	Katarina Kutnar	Violin	1) Scherzo in c-minor form F-A-E sonata by Johannes Brahms; 2) Carmen Phantasie, op.66 by Franz Drdla	—N/a

==== Part 2 (6 May 2012) ====
R/O	Country	Broadcaster	Performer	Instrument	Piece(s)	R.
9	Poland	TVP	Jagoda Krzemińska	Flute	1) Joueurs de Flute - "Pan" by Albert Roussel; 2) Staccato - Fantaisie by Wilhelm Popp	Q
10	Ukraine	NTU	Bohdan Ivasyk	Violin	1) Tzigane by Maurice Ravel; 2) Melody by Myroslav Skoryk	—N/a
11	Netherlands	NTR	Ella van Poucke	Cello	1) Fantasiestucke Op. 73 for cello by Robert Schumann	—N/a
12	Germany	WDR	Dominic Chamot	Piano	1) Jazz Etude No. 1 by Nikolai Kapustin; 2) Widmung (Liebeslied) by Robert Schumann and Franz Liszt; 3) Ungarische Rhapsodie No. 6 by Franz Liszt	Q
13	Belarus	BTRC	Alexandra Denisenya	Cimbalom	1) Carmen "Fantasie", based on Themes from the Opera of Georges Bizet by Franz Waxman; 2) Blow light wind, blow! (adaptation of Belarusian folk song) by Valery Zhyvalievski; 3) Сsardas by Alexander Tsygankov	Q
14	Norway	NRK	Eivind Holtsmark Ringstad	Viola	1) Sonata no 1 op 120 F minor, 1. movement: Allegro Appassionata by Johannes Brahms; 2) Sonata no 1 op 25 for viola solo, 4. movement: Rasendes Zeitmass. Wild. Tonschonheit ist Nebesache by Paul Hindemith; 3) Andante and Rondo Ungarese by Carl Maria von Weber	Q

=== Final ===
Awards were given to the top three participants. The table below highlights these using gold, silver, and bronze. The placing results of the remaining participants is unknown and never made public by the European Broadcasting Union.

R/O	Country	Performer	Instrument	Piece(s)	Composer	Pl.
1	Belarus	Alexandra Denisenya	Cimbalom	Concertino	Vladimir Kurjan	
2	Poland	Jagoda Krzemińska	Flute	Concertino	Cécile Chaminade	
3	Norway	Eivind Holtsmark Ringstad	Viola	Viola concerto, 2nd and 3rd mov.	Béla Viktor János Bartók	1
4	Czech Republic	Michaela Špačková	Bassoon	Bassoon Concerto in F-dur, 1st mov.	Carl Maria von Weber	
5	Germany	Dominic Chamot	Piano	Piano Concerto No. 1 in B flat minor, Op. 23, 3rd mov. Allegro con fuoco	Pyotr Tchaikovsky	
6	Armenia	Narek Kazazyan	Kanon	Qanun Concerto No. 2 in E-Major	Khachatur Avetisyan	3
7	Austria	Emmanuel Tjeknavorian	Violin	Violin Concerto in D minor, Op. 47, 3rd mov. Allegro ma non tanto	Jean Sibelius	2

== Jury members ==
The list of jury members are as follows:

=== Semi-final jury ===
- Poland – Agnieszka Duczmal (head)
- Norway – Christian Eggen
- Ireland – Carol McGonnell
- Austria – Franz Bartolomey

=== Final jury ===
- Italy – Markus Hinterhäuser (head)
- Poland – Agnieszka Duczmal
- Norway – Christian Eggen
- Ireland – Carol McGonnell
- Czech Republic – Radek Baborák

== Broadcasting ==
Broadcasters in seven countries received the competition live via the Eurovision Network and broadcast it in their territories. The semi-final round was only broadcast on the official website of the contest.

Known details on the broadcasts in each country, including the specific broadcasting stations and commentators are shown in the tables below.

Broadcasters in participating countries
Country	Broadcaster(s)	Channel(s)	Commentator(s)	Ref(s)
Armenia	ARMTV (live)	Armenia 1		
Austria	ORF (live)	ORF 2		
Belarus	BTRC (live)	Belarus 1, Belarus-TV		
Bosnia and Herzegovina	BHRT (live)	BHT1, BH Radio 1	Maja Baralić Materne	
Croatia	HRT			
Czech Republic	ČT	ČT2 (Note: Delayed broadcast on 19 May)		
Georgia	GPB	1TV (Note: Delayed broadcast on 12 May at 14:00)		
Germany	ARD	SWR Fernsehen (Note: Delayed broadcast on 21 April 2013 at 08:55)		
Germany	ARD	WDR Fernsehen (Note: Delayed broadcast on 1 July at 10:40)		
Germany	3sat (live)			
Greece	ERT (Note: Delayed broadcast on 12 May at 12:30)			
Netherlands	NTR (Note: Delayed broadcast in a shortened format, as part of NTR Podium, on 21 May)		Biëlla Luttmer, Sven Arne Tepl and Christiaan Kuyvenhoven	
Norway	NRK (live)	NRK1		
Poland	TVP (live)	TVP Kultura		
Slovenia	RTVSLO	TV SLO 2		
Ukraine	NTU (live)			

Broadcasters in non-participating countries
Country	Broadcaster
Iceland	RÚV

== See also ==
- ABU Radio Song Festival 2012
- ABU TV Song Festival 2012
- Eurovision Song Contest 2012
- Junior Eurovision Song Contest 2012
