= Anna-Liisa Bezrodny =

Estonian-Finnish violinist (born 1981)

Anna-Liisa Bezrodny (born 10 September 1981) is an Estonian/Finnish violinist.

Bezrodny was born in Moscow, Soviet Union, to Russian violinist and music pedagogue Igor Bezrodny and Estonian violinist Mari Tampere. She is of Estonian, Georgian, Russian and Jewish descent, and she speaks four native languages. She grew up in Finland, where her parents worked as teachers.

At the age of nine, she began studying violin at the Sibelius Academy in Helsinki, Finland, and later continued at the Guildhall School of Music and Drama in London.

She is a member of Estonian Association of Professional Musicians.

== Awards ==
She has won many awards around the world:

- III prize at the International Kocian Violin Competition in Czech Republic (1995)
- I prize at the International Frankfurt Music Festival (1999)
- winner of Estonian round of Eurovision Young Musicians (2000)
- ETV prize at competition-festival for Estonia's young musicians "Con brio" (2002)
- III prize at International Jascha Heifetz Competition in Vilnius (2005)
- II prize at Johannes Brahms Competition in Austria, Pörtschach (2006)
- Annual Award of the Edowment for Music of Cultural Endowment of Estonia (2013)
