= Eurovision Young Musicians 2022 =

Eurovision Young Musicians contest

Coordinates: 43.6111°N 3.8781°E

Date and venue
- Final: 23 July 2022
- Venue: The Corum; Montpellier, France

Organisation
- Organiser: European Broadcasting Union (EBU)

Production
- Host broadcaster: Radio France; France Télévisions
- Director: Franck Broqua
- Executive producer: Gérard Pont; Gérard Lacroix; Sylvan Plantard
- Musical director: Pierre Dumoussaud
- Presenters: Judith Chaine; Vincent Delbushaye

Participants
- Number of entries: 9
- Returning countries: Austria; France
- Non-returning countries: Albania; Estonia; Greece; Hungary; Israel; Malta; Russia; San Marino; Slovenia; Spain; United Kingdom
- Participation map: Competing countries Countries that participated in the past but not in 2022

Vote
- Voting system: Each juror awards a mark from 1–10 to each performer based on specific criteria
- Winning musician: Czech Republic; Daniel Matejča

Eurovision Young Musicians 2022 was the 20th edition of Eurovision Young Musicians, held on 23 July 2022 at the Corum in Montpellier, France, and presented by Judith Chaine and Vincent Delbushaye. It was organised by the European Broadcasting Union (EBU) and host broadcasters Radio France and France Télévisions, which staged the event as part of a summer series of music events called Festival Radio France Occitanie Montpellier. The Montpellier Occitanie National Opera Orchestra conducted by Pierre Dumoussaud accompanied all competing performers.

Musicians representing nine countries with EBU membership participated in the contest, with Austria and host country France returning. Eleven countries, namely Albania, Estonia, Greece, Hungary, Israel, Malta, Russia, San Marino, Slovenia, Spain, and the United Kingdom, were absent from this edition after having taken part in the previous contest in 2018, with Russia being barred from participating due to its invasion of Ukraine. Although initially not included on the list of participants, it was later revealed that Croatia would still take part.

The winner was violinist Daniel Matejča representing the Czech Republic, with cellist Philipp Schupelius representing Germany placing second, and violinist Alma Serafin Kraggerud representing Norway placing third. This was Czech Republic's first win in the competition and at any Eurovision event since being awarded the youth jury prize at the Eurovision Young Dancers 2003.

== 2020 contest ==
Following Russia's victory with Ivan Bessonov at the 2018 contest in Edinburgh, the former EBU Head of Live Events and executive supervisor of the Eurovision Song Contest, Jon Ola Sand, announced that the EBU was "open" to the idea of the next edition being held in Russia.

In July 2019, the EBU announced that a 2020 contest was initially planned to take place in Zagreb, Croatia, on 21 June 2020 to coincide with World Music Day, however, in March 2020 it was postponed indefinitely as a result of the COVID-19 pandemic. The future of the contest remained uncertain until 3 February 2022 when the Norwegian broadcaster NRK and later the Belgian broadcaster RTBF confirmed that there would be a 2022 edition.

Broadcasters that confirmed their presence at the 2020 contest until its postponement were: Croatia (HRT), Czechia (ČT), Estonia (ERR), Germany (WDR), Greece (ERT), Malta (PBS), Norway (NRK), Poland (TVP), Slovenia (RTVSLO), Sweden (SVT), and Ukraine (UA:PBC). Among them, Estonia, Greece, Malta, Slovenia and Ukraine did not make an appearance at the 2022 contest.

Croatia and Sweden had already selected their entrants for the 2020 contest prior to postponement; Croatia selected Ivan Petrović-Poljak, who would be reselected to represent the country at the 2022 contest, whilst Sweden selected Tekla Nilsson, who was not retained for 2022. Slovenia selected its representative after the contest was postponed, having selected Sebastijan Buda, but was absent from the 2022 edition.

== Location ==
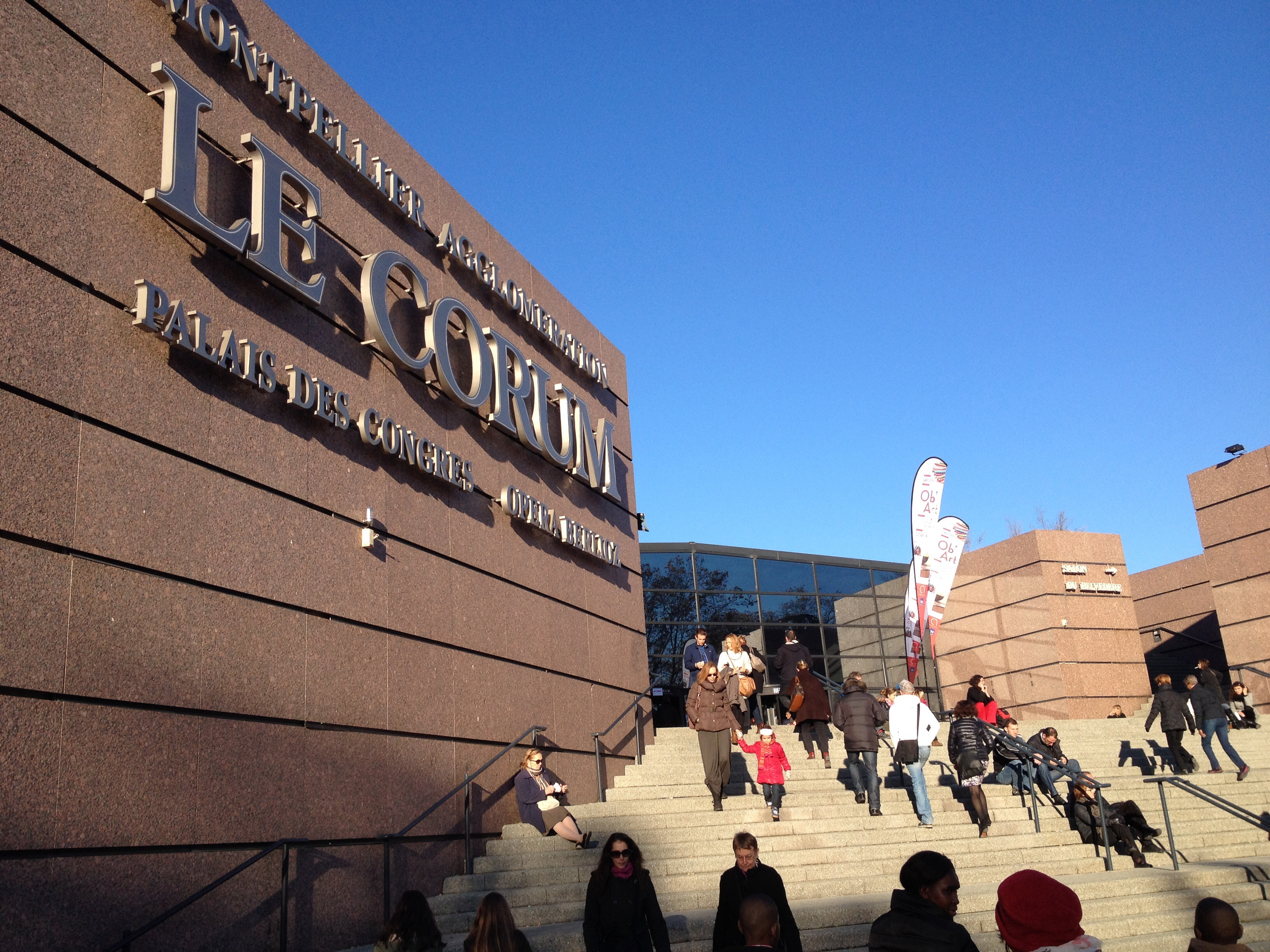
The contest was held at Corum's Opéra Berlioz in Montpellier, France

The event took place in Montpellier during the annual summer festival, Festival Radio France Occitanie Montpellier, and this was the first time that France had hosted the contest. The selected venue was the Corum, a building that houses both a conference centre and an opera house (Opéra Berlioz), and is located in the centre of the city in southern France. The last time that France hosted a Eurovision event was the Junior Eurovision Song Contest 2021 in Paris.

== Format ==
=== Presenters ===
On 28 March 2022, the Culturebox channel announced on social networks that the playwright Judith Chaine would be the presenter of the twentieth edition of the competition. She is known for having presented the Musiques en fête since 2018, alongside Cyril Féraud and the Victoires de la musique classique since 2019 and has worked for radio station France Musique since 2007. On 26 June 2022, it was announced that Vincent Delbushaye would join as co-host of the competition. Belgian-born Delbushaye is a radio presenter for Musiq'3, the classical radio station of French-language broadcaster RTBF.

=== Jury members ===
On 5 July 2022, France Télévisions announced the jurors of the competition. The jurors for the final are Lithuanian pianist and chair of the jury Mūza Rubackytė, Swiss oboist Nora Cismondi, director of the Festival Radio France Montpellier Jean-Pierre Rousseau, French cellist Christian-Pierre La Marca, and Albanian violinist Tedi Papavrami.

== Participants and results ==
For a country to be eligible for potential participation in Eurovision Young Musicians, it must be an active member of the European Broadcasting Union (EBU). Nine countries participated in the competition, the lowest number since 1984. Of the participants, Austria and France returned after being absent the previous edition, while 11 nations that had participated in the last edition did not return this year. Non-returning countries included Albania, Estonia, Greece, Hungary, Israel, Malta, Russia, San Marino, Slovenia, Spain and United Kingdom. The winner of the event was the Czech Republic with Daniel Matejča's violin performance of the 3rd and 4th mvt from Violin Concerto No. 1 by D. Shostakovich.

Participants and results
R/O	Country	Broadcaster	Performer(s)	Instrument	Piece(s)	Composer(s)	Pl.
1	Croatia	HRT	Ivan Petrović-Poljak	Piano	Piano Concerto No. 1 in E flat major, 3rd and 4th mvt	Franz Liszt	
2	France	France Télévisions	Maxime Grizard	Cello	Cello concerto in B minor, 1st mvt	Antonín Dvořák	
3	Poland	TVP	Milena Pioruńska	Violin	Violin Concerto No. 2 in D minor, 3rd mvt	Henryk Wieniawski	
4	Germany	WDR	Philipp Schupelius	Cello	Pezzo capriccioso, op.62	Pyotr Ilyich Tchaikovsky	2
5	Austria	ORF	Alexander Svetnitsky-Ehrenreich	Clarinet	Clarinet concerto No. 2 in E flat major, 3rd mvt	Carl Maria von Weber	
6	Norway	NRK	Alma Serafin Kraggerud	Violin	Introduction and Rondo Capriccioso, op.28	Camille Saint-Saëns	3
7	Belgium	RTBF	Thaïs Defoort	Cello	Cello concerto in E minor, op.85, 1st mvt	Edward Elgar	
8	Sweden	SVT	Lukas Flink	Trombone	Trombone Concerto, 1st mvt	Henri Tomasi	
9	Czech Republic	ČT	Daniel Matejča	Violin	Violin Concerto No. 1, 3rd and 4th mvt	Dmitri Shostakovich	1

== Broadcasting ==
All participating broadcasters may choose to have on-site or remote commentators providing insight and voting information to their local audience. Some broadcasters aired the show "as live" on 23 July 2022 at 21:00 CEST, with others moving the broadcast to other time slots or other dates.

Broadcasters and commentators in participating countries
Country	Date of broadcast	Time	Channel(s)	Commentator(s)	Ref(s)
Belgium	23 July 2022	Live	La Trois, Musiq'3	No commentary	
Croatia	23 July 2022	Live	HRT 3	Ivana Kocelj	
Czech Republic	23 July 2022	Live	ČT art	Jiří Vejvoda	
France	23 July 2022	Live	France Musique	No commentary	
France	23 July 2022	21:10 CEST	Culturebox	No commentary	
Norway	23 July 2022	Live	NRK1	Arild Erikstad	
Poland	23 July 2022	Live	TVP Kultura	Unknown	
Germany	24 July 2022	7:40 CEST	WDR Fernsehen	Unknown	
Austria	24 July 2022	22:10 CEST	ORF 2	Teresa Vogl	
Sweden	29 July 2022	—N/a (Note: Video on demand)	SVT Play	Camilla Lundberg	
Sweden	30 July 2022	20:01 CEST	SVT 2	Camilla Lundberg	
