= Emmanuel Tjeknavorian =

Armenian violinist and conductor (born 1995)

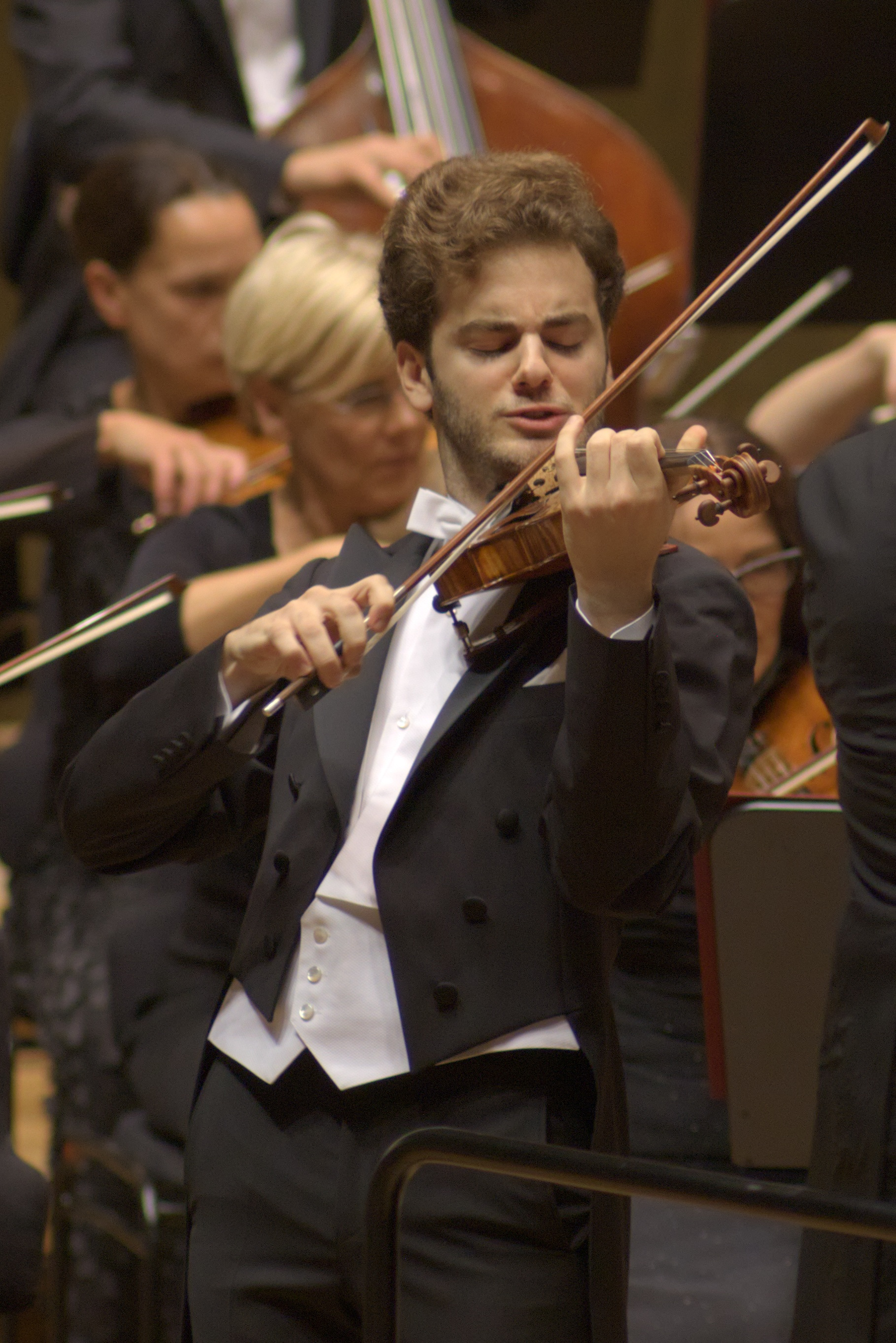
- Emmanuel Tjeknavorian in the Gewandhaus, 2018

Background information
- Born: 22 April 1995 (age 31); Vienna, Austria
- Genres: Classical
- Instrument: Violin

Emmanuel Tjeknavorian (born 22 April 1995 in Vienna, Austria) is an Armenian violinist and conductor. His father, Loris Tjeknavorian is the Iranian-Armenian composer and conductor.

== Awards and competitions ==
In 2012, he represented Austria at the Eurovision Young Musicians contest.

In September 2014, Tjeknavorian was the first Austrian to make it to the final round in the history of the Fritz Kreisler Competition, where he won third place. In November 2014, he received the Casinos Austria Rising Star Award. In December 2015, he placed second in the International Jean Sibelius Violin Competition.
