= Leonhard Baumgartner =

Austrian violinist

Leonhard Baumgartner (born 2007) is an Austrian violinist. He won the ICMA Discovery Award in 2023 and the Eurovision Young Musicians Competition in the following year.

== History ==
Baumgartner was born in Vienna and started playing at the age of fifteen. He has been a student of Dora Schwarzberg and Ingolf Turban.
