= Mikołaj Majkusiak =

Polish composer and accordionist

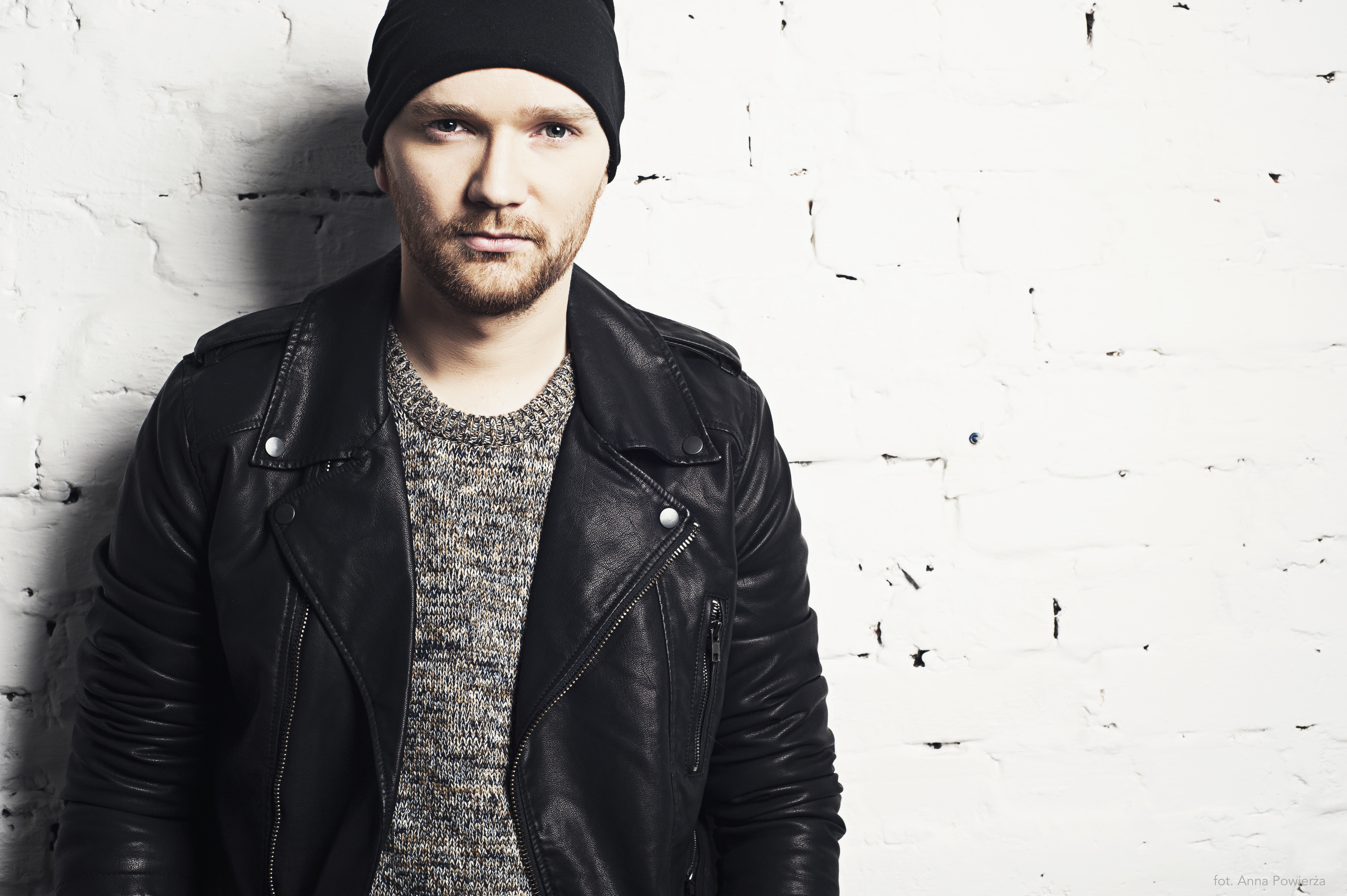
- Majkusiak in 2013

Background information
- Born: 29 July 1983 (age 42); Warsaw, Poland
- Genres: Classical music
- Occupations: Composer; accordionist; arranger; producer
- Instrument: Accordion

Mikołaj Majkusiak (born 29 July 1983) is a Polish composer, accordionist, arranger and producer.

== Selected works ==
- FisConcerto, for two accordions and orchestra (2007)
- up2U, for accordion and string quartet (2013)
- Rhythm Games, for cello, accordion and string orchestra (2014)
- Sonata, for violin and accordion (2015)
- Dyad, for solo accordion (2016)
- Insomnia, for saxophone quartet (2018)
- Concerto in C, for flute, piano and symphony orchestra (2019)
- Concerto in G, for string orchestra (2020)
- Chamber Concerto, for accordion and string orchestra (2020)
- Concerto in E-flat, for saxophone and orchestra (2021)
