= Alexandra Soumm =

French violinist from Montpellier (born 1989)

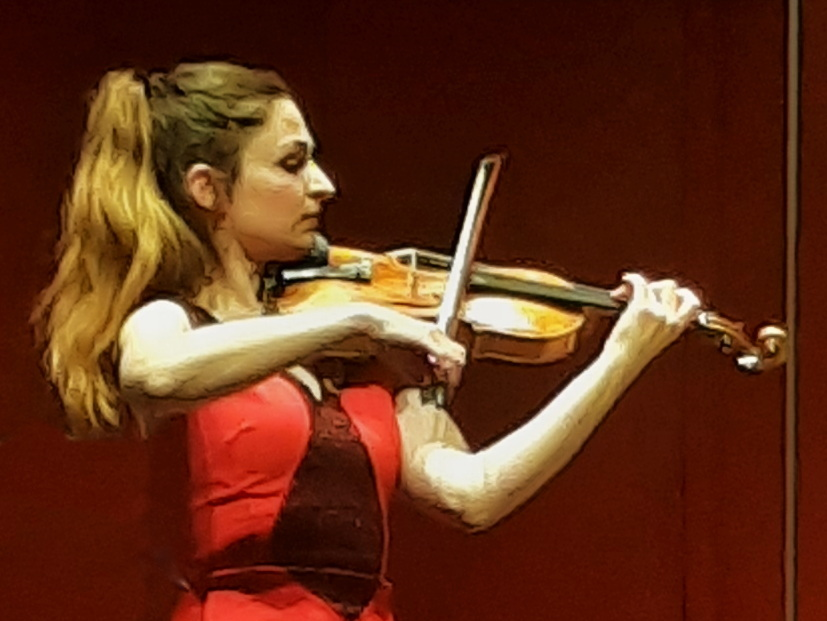
- Soumm in 2025

Background information
- Born: 17 May 1989 (age 36); Moscow, Russia
- Origin: Montpellier, France
- Genres: Classical
- Occupation: Violinist
- Instrument: Violin
- Labels: Claves Records
- Website: alexandrasoumm.com

Alexandra Soumm (Russian: Александра Сумм; born 17 May 1989 in Moscow, Russia) is a French violinist from Montpellier.

== Early life ==
Soumm was born in 1989 and comes from a family of musicians. Her Ukrainian father and grandfather were violinists, and her a Russian mother pianist. She grew up in Montepellier, France, and lives in Brussels with her partner and child.

She started learning the violin at the age of five, and two years later, at the age of seven, gave her first performance.

From 2000–2008 she was at the University of Music and Performing Arts Graz doing a preparation course. She studied at the Music and Arts University of the City of Vienna with Boris Kuschnir.

== Career ==
In 2002 she won the Fidelio competition for violins of Music and Arts University of the City of Vienna. She won the Eurovision Young Musicians 2004 representing Austria in Lucerne, Switzerland. She was a member of the BBC Radio 3 New Generation Artists scheme during its 2010–2012 season. She had solo performances with the London Philharmonic, BBC London, NKK Tokio, Danish National Orchester, Münchner Symphoniker, Baltimore Symphony, Orchestre de Paris. She performed with many conductors including Rafael Frühbeck de Burgos, Herbert Blomstedt, Osmo Vänskä, Marin Alsop, and Seiji Ozawa.

Soumm participates in events with young musicians, like the Ilumina Festival in Brazil. In 2012 she created the Esperanz'Arts organisation with Maria Mosconi, altiste, and pianist Paloma Kouider. In 2019 it had a hundred members, and partners with hospitals, prisons, schools.

From 2021 until 2024 she taught at the University of Music and Performing Arts in Vienna.

== Records ==
- Released in 2008 – An album comprising the Bruch and the first Paganini concerto. Claves Records.
- Released in 2010 – Recording of violin sonatas by Grieg. Claves Records.
