= Stanisław Drzewiecki =

Polish pianist and composer

Stanisław Drzewiecki (born 1987) is a Polish pianist and composer. His parents are Russian pianist Tatiana Shebanova and Polish pianist Jarosław Drzewiecki. Drzewiecki began playing the piano aged four and made his first stage appearance aged five. In 2000 he won the Eurovision Young Musicians competition.
