= Sabine Toutain =

French violinist (born 1966)

- Born: 1966 (age 59–60); Le Mans, Pays de la Loire, France
- Education: Conservatoire de Paris
- Occupations: Violist; music educator
- Years active: 1990–present

Sabine Toutain (born in 1966) is a contemporary French violist.

== Biography ==
=== Training and prizes ===
Sabine Toutain was born in Le Mans in 1966; she began her musical studies there and then entered the Conservatoire de Paris in 1982.

In 1984, she won the First Prize of alto in Serge Collot's class and first prize in chamber music with Bruno Pasquier. She perfected herself in Jean Moullière's string quartet class in order to take part in international competitions. She was then a finalist in the Eurovision competition for young musicians and a prize-winner of the Maurice Vieux International Viola Competition. Finally, she won the second prize at the Geneva International Music Competition and the Jacques Murgier Prize at the international competition of Reims.

=== Career ===
Since 1990, she has been performing in many European concert halls and festivals, either as a soloist (Bartok and Walton's concertos with the Orchestre national de France for example) or as part of the Turner Trio concerts where she played with two other musicians of the Orchestre national: harpist Isabelle Perrin and flautist Philippe Pierlot.

She is the dedicatee of new works, notably Episode Six by Betsy Jolas and in 1989 Chant II by Ramon Lazkano, for viola and tapes.

=== Teaching ===
She is passionate about teaching, and since 2000 has been teaching the viola at the Conservatoire de Paris.

== Discography ==
Sabine Toutain notably recorded the Goldberg Variations (string trio) by Johann Sebastian Bach, trios and sonatas by Arnold Bax, the Sonata for flute, viola and harp by Claude Debussy, the sextuor pour piano, cordes et vent by Ernst von Dohnányi, Itinerario de Luz by Enrique Macias, the concerto for viola and orchestra by Serge Nigg, Metamorphosen by Richard Strauss. etc.
