= Lucerne Culture and Congress Centre =

Multipurpose building in Lucerne, Switzerland

Coordinates: 47.050°N 8.312°E

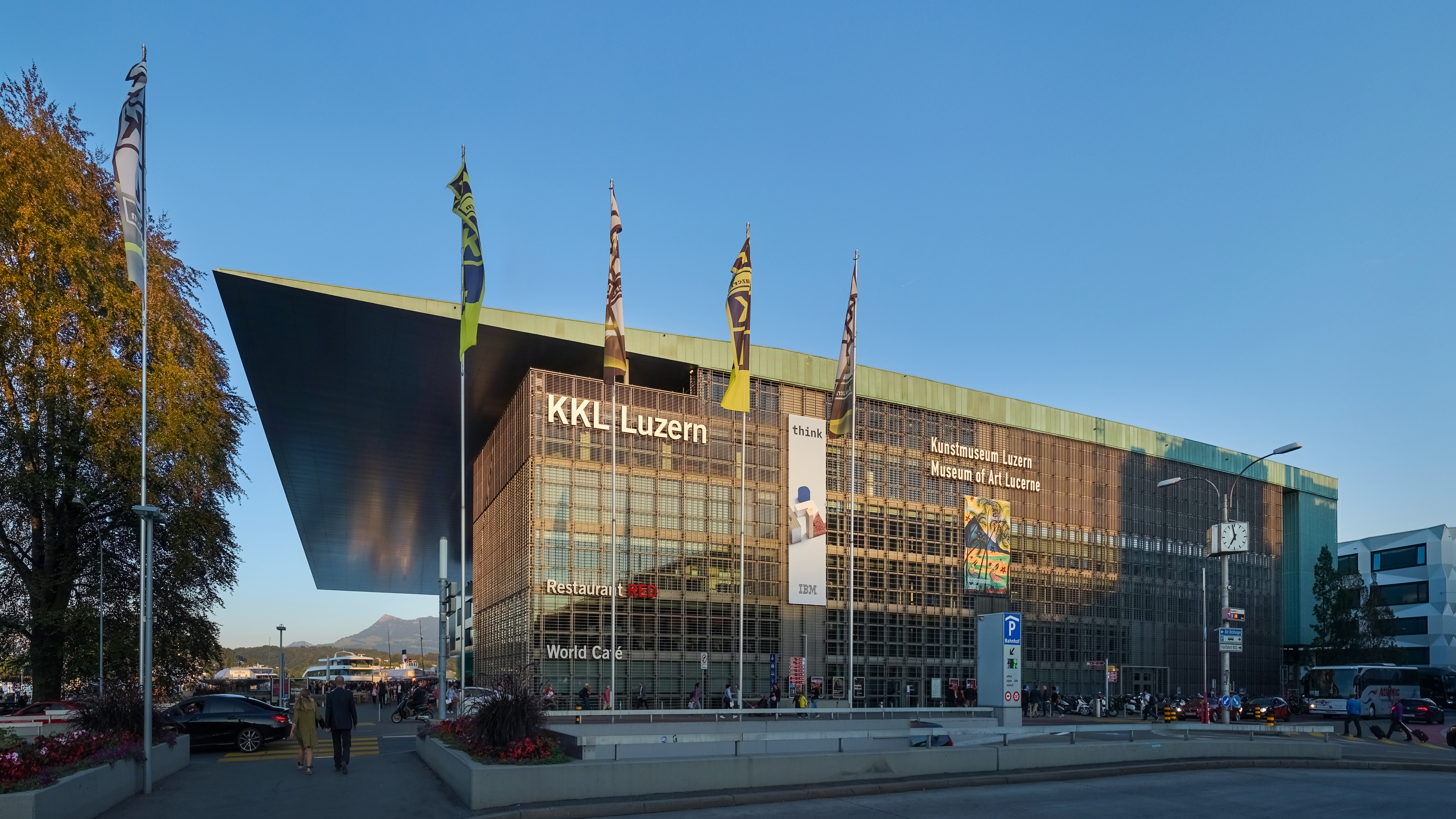
Culture and Congress Center in September 2018

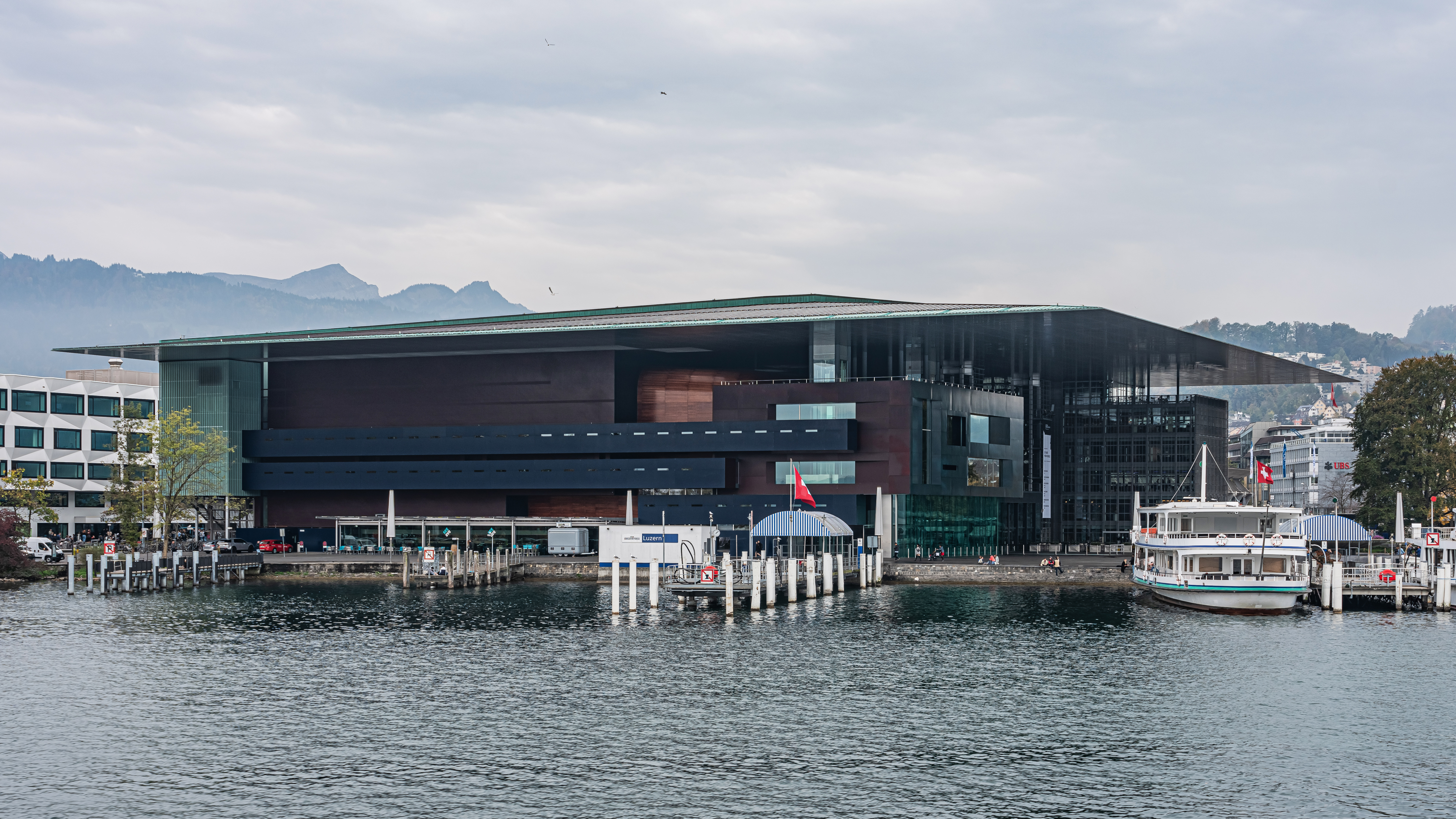
Luzern KKL in October 2022

Lucerne Culture and Congress Centre (German: Kultur- und Kongresszentrum Luzern, abbreviated KKL) is a multi-functional venue in Lucerne, Switzerland. Designed by French architect Jean Nouvel, the complex includes a concert hall, an art museum, conference facilities, and restaurants. The concert hall opened on 18 August 1998, and the full complex was inaugurated in March 2000. The structure features a roof measuring 100 by 100 metres and was designed with particular attention to acoustics. The Centre regularly hosts cultural events and serves as the central venue for the annual Lucerne Festival.

== History ==
In August 2000, the Lucerne Culture and Congress Centre was completed with the installation of an organ in the main auditorium. The instrument was designed in the French-Romantic tradition and operates on a mechanical basis. It was inaugurated during that year’s Lucerne Festival, which had the theme “Metamorphoses”.

== Hosted events ==
In 2015, Swiss clown Dimitri performed at the Centre alongside his two daughters and grandson, marking the first joint appearance of three generations of his family on stage.

In September 2023, two climate activists from Renovate Switzerland disrupted a performance by the Bavarian State Orchestra during the Lucerne Festival at the Centre by gluing themselves to the conductor’s podium. The conductor, Vladimir Jurowski, allowed them to briefly speak before continuing the performance.

In 2024, the European Film Academy announced that the 37th European Film Awards would be held at the Centre on December 4, marking the first time the ceremony took place in Switzerland.
