= Martin Grubinger =

Austrian percussionist

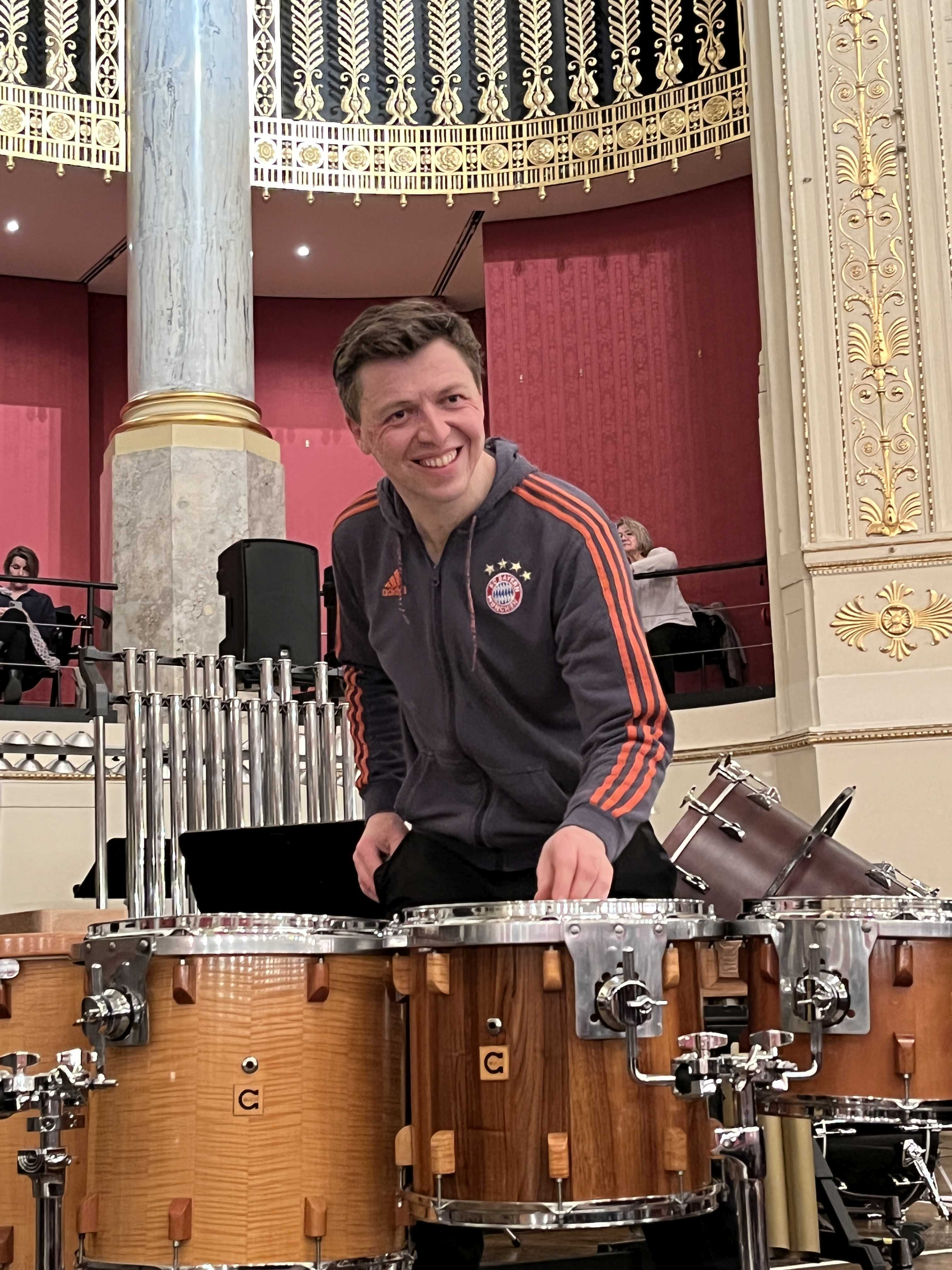
- Grubinger in 2023
- Born: 23 May 1983 (age 43); Salzburg, Austria
- Occupations: Percussionist; Academic teacher
- Organizations: Mozarteum

Martin Grubinger (German: [ˌmaʁtiːn ˈɡʁuːbɪŋɐ] born 29 May 1983 in Salzburg) is an Austrian multi-percussionist.

== Life and career ==
Born in Salzburg, Grubinger received his first instruction from his father, Martin Grubinger sen., a percussionist and percussion instructor at the Mozarteum. At an early age, he competed in the World Marimba Competition in Okaya, Nagano (Japan) and the EBU Competition in Norway, where he was a finalist. He studied at the Bruckner Conservatory in Linz and starting in 2000 at the Mozarteum.

Since academic year 2018/19, Grubinger is a professor of classical percussion at the Mozarteum.

=== Career ===
Grubinger represented Austria at the Eurovision Young Musicians 2000 in Bergen, Norway. In 2007 he was awarded the Leonard Bernstein Award of the Schleswig-Holstein Musik Festival and in 2010 won the Würth Prize of Jeunesses Musicales Germany, a prize of the Stiftung Würth (Würth Foundation).

He was one of the presenters of the Eurovision Young Musicians 2012, held in Vienna. Three years later he performed again in Vienna as an interval act in the Eurovision Song Contest 2015.

In 2023, he ended his concert career.

=== Personal life ===
Grubinger is married to the pianist Ferzan Önder since 2009 and they have a son.

Preceded by Emmelie de Forest	Eurovision Song Contest; Final Interval act 2015	Succeeded by Justin Timberlake
