= Violin Concerto No. 5 (Vieuxtemps) =

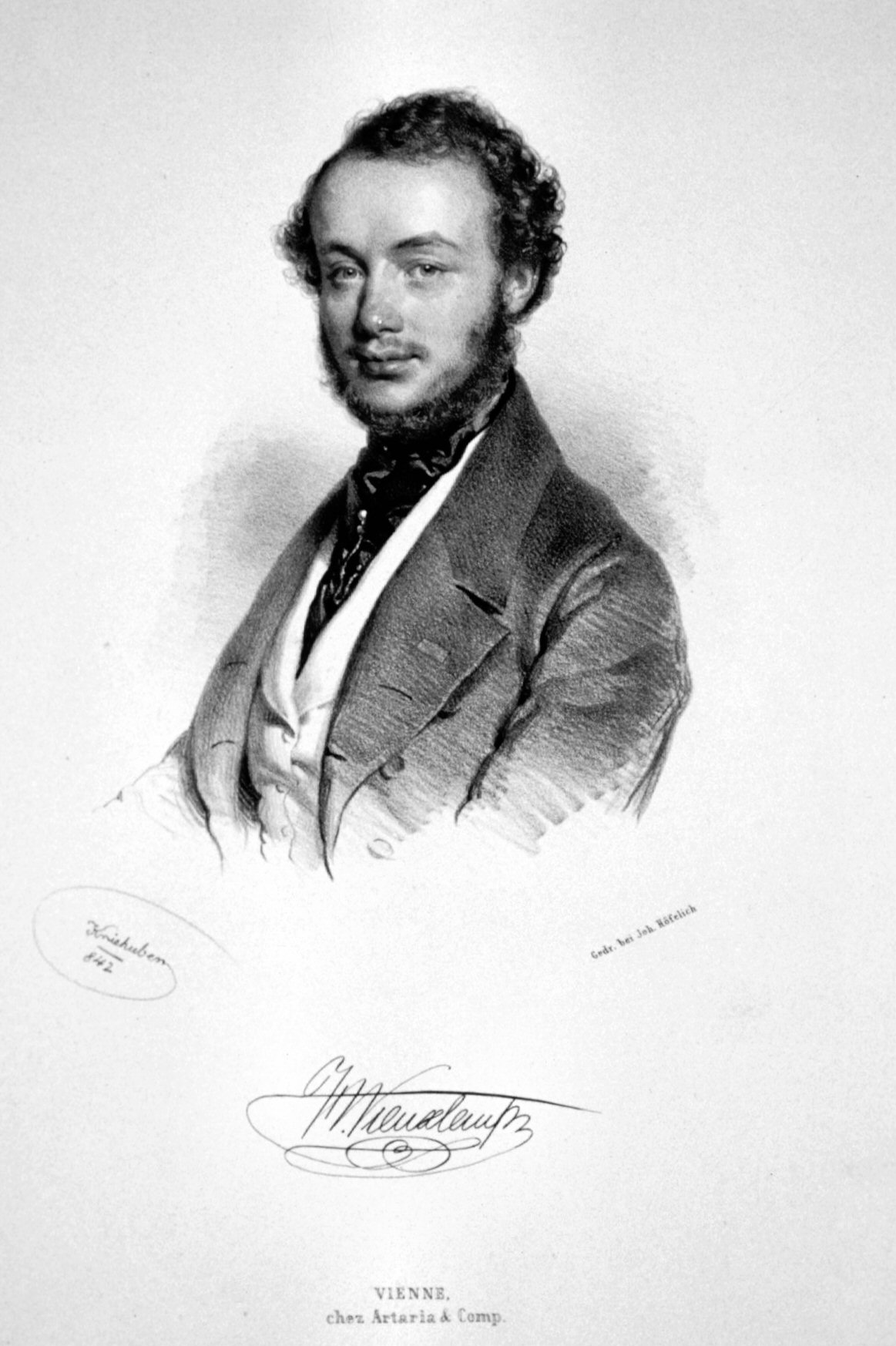
Henri Vieuxtemps, Lithograph by Josef Kriehuber, 1842

The Violin Concerto No. 5 in A minor, Op. 37, by Henri Vieuxtemps was published in 1861 and composed 1858–59. Leopold Auer (1925, p. 75) writes that the concerto had been "practically forgotten" but if played as its composer intended, "will not fail to impress the majority of its auditors". The second movement borrows from "Où peut-on être mieux qu'au sein de sa famille?" in Grétry's opera Lucile. It is now a well known violin concerto in the repertoire and is played often in competitions and concerts.

== Structure ==
The work consists of three movements played without breaks:

1. Allegro non troppo
2. Adagio
3. Allegro con fuoco

A full performance of the piece usually lasts from 18 to 20 minutes.
