= List of countries in Eurovision Young Musicians =

Participation since 1982: Entered at least once Never entered, although eligible to do so Competed as a part of another country but never as a sovereignty

Broadcasters from forty-four countries have participated in Eurovision Young Musicians since it started in 1982, with winners coming from twelve of those countries. This biennial classical music competition organised by the European Broadcasting Union (EBU) is held between members of the union, who participate representing their countries. Broadcasters send to the competition one young talented musician aged 12 to 21 that performs a piece of classical music of their choice accompanied by the event's orchestra, and a jury, composed of international experts, decides the top 3 participants.

Participation in the contest is primarily open to all broadcasters with active EBU membership, with only one entrant per country allowed in any given year. To become an active member of the EBU, a broadcaster has to be from a country which is covered by the European Broadcasting Area –that is not limited only to the continent of Europe–, or is a member state of the Council of Europe. Thus, eligibility is not determined by geographic inclusion within Europe, despite the "Euro" in "Eurovision", nor does it have a direct connection with the European Union.

== Participants ==
Eurovision Young Musicians, inspired by the success of the BBC Young Musician of the Year, is a biennial competition organised by the European Broadcasting Union (EBU) for European musicians that are 18 years old or younger. The first edition of Eurovision Young Musicians took place in Manchester, United Kingdom on 11 May 1982 and six countries took part. Germany's Markus Pawlik won the contest, with France and Switzerland placing second and third respectively. The 2020 contest was cancelled, so it will be excluded from the table below.

Listed are all the countries that have ever taken part in the competition, alongside the year in which they made their debut:

Table key
†	Inactive – countries which participated in the past but did not appear in the most recent contest, or will not appear in the upcoming contest
◇	Ineligible – countries whose broadcasters have been suspended from the European Broadcasting Union and are therefore ineligible to participate
‡	Former – countries which previously participated but no longer exist

Country	Broadcaster(s)	Debut year	Latest entry	Entries	Finals	Times qualified	Latest final	Wins	Latest win
Albania †	RTSH	2018		1	0	0/1	N/A	0	N/A
Armenia	AMPTV	2012	2026	3	3	1/1	2026	0	N/A
Austria †	ORF	1982	2024	20	16	10/14	2024	6	2024
Belarus ◇	BTRC	2010	2012	2	2	2/2	2012	0	N/A
Belgium	VRT (Dutch); RTBF (French)	1986	2027	13	5	2/10	2026	0	N/A
Bosnia and Herzegovina †	BHRT	2012		1	0	0/1	N/A	0	N/A
Bulgaria †	BNT	2006		1	0	0/1	N/A	0	N/A
Croatia †	HRT	1994	2022	13	5	2/10	2022	0	N/A
Cyprus	CyBC	1988	2026	13	1	0/12	2026	0	N/A
Czechia (Note: Participated as Czech Republic until 2022.)	ČT	2002	2027	11	8	3/6	2026	1	2022
Denmark (Note: The four Nordic countries (Denmark, Finland, Norway and Sweden) originally sent a joint participant to the contest. In 1982, the musician represented the Norwegian colours and the Finnish colours in 1984. The nations were represented individually, following the introduction of a preliminary round, at the 1986 contest.) †	DR	1986	2002	7	2	2/7	1994	0	N/A
Estonia †	ERR	1994	2018	7	3	3/7	2004	0	N/A
Finland †	Yle	1984	2008	13	8	7/12	2008	0	N/A
France	TF1 (1982); France 3 (1984–2000); France Télévisions (2022–2024); Radio France (2022)	1982	2024	11	10	6/7	2024	1	1986
Georgia †	GPB	2012		1	0	0/1	N/A	0	N/A
Germany	ZDF (1982–2004); WDR (ARD) (2008–)	1982	2027	21	15	8/14	2026	2	1996
Greece †	ERT	1990	2018	13	3	2/12	2014	1	2008
Hungary †	MTVA	1992	2018	6	5	3/4	2018	0	N/A
Ireland †	RTÉ	1986	2000	8	0	0/8	N/A	0	N/A
Israel †	IBA (1986); IPBC (2018)	1986	2018	2	0	0/2	N/A	0	N/A
Italy †	RAI	1986	2002	4	1	1/4	1988	0	N/A
Latvia	LTV (1994–2002); LSM (2026-)	1994	2027	6	4	3/5	2026	0	N/A
Lithuania	LRT	1994	2027	1	0	0/1	N/A	0	N/A
Malta †	PBS	2014	2018	3	2	0/1	2016	0	N/A
Moldova †	TRM	2014		1	1	N/A	2014	0	N/A
Netherlands †	NOS (1984–1990, 2000–2004); NPS (2006–2010); NTR (2012–2014)	1984	2014	13	5	3/11	2014	2	1990
North Macedonia (Note: Until 2018 it was known as F.Y.R. Macedonia.)†	MKRTV	1994		1	0	0/1	N/A	0	N/A
Norway†	NRK	1982	2024	20	15	12/17	2024	1	2012
Poland	TVP	1992	2026	17	12	10/15	2026	4	2026
Portugal	RTP	1990	2027	7	2	0/5	2026	0	N/A
Romania †	TVR	2002	2010	5	1	1/5	2006	0	N/A
Russia ◇	VGTRK	1994	2018	9	6	6/9	2018	1	2018
San Marino †	SMRTV	2016	2018	2	1	0/1	2016	0	N/A
Serbia	RTS	2008	2026	3	2	0/1	2026	0	N/A
Serbia and Montenegro ‡	UJRT	2006		1	0	0/1	N/A	0	N/A
Slovakia †	STV	1998		1	1	1/1	1998	0	N/A
Slovenia †	RTV SLO	1994	2018	13	7	5/11	2018	1	2010
Spain †	TVE (1988–2000); RTVE (2018)	1988	2018	8	1	1/8	1992	0	N/A
Sweden	SVT	1986	2026	18	8	3/13	2026	1	2006
Switzerland	SRG SSR	1982	2026	15	9	5/11	2026	0	N/A
Turkey †	TRT	2000		1	0	0/1	N/A	0	N/A
Ukraine †	NTU	2008	2012	2	0	0/2	N/A	0	N/A
United Kingdom †	BBC	1982	2018	16	10	8/14	2008	1	1994
Yugoslavia (Note: The Federal Republic of Yugoslavia competed as "Yugoslavia" in 1992.) ‡	JRT	1986	1992	4	1	1/4	1986	0	N/A

=== Other EBU members ===
The following countries have broadcasters eligible to participate in Eurovision Young Musicians, but have yet to make their debut at the contest.

- Algeria – ENTV, ENRS, TDA
- Andorra – RTVA
- Azerbaijan – İTV
- Canada – CBC/Radio-Canada
- Czechoslovakia – ČST (1991–1992, (Note: Succeeded by Česká televize (ČT) of the Czech Republic and Slovenská televízia (STV) of Slovakia.) dissolved)
- Egypt – ERTU
- Iceland – RÚV
- Jordan – JRTV
- Lebanon – TL
- Libya – LJBC (1982–2011), LNC (2011–present)
- Luxembourg – CLT, ERSL
- Monaco – TMC
- Montenegro – RTCG
- Morocco – SNRT
- Tunisia – ERTT
- Vatican City – RV

== Participating countries by decade ==
Line graph showing the number of countries participating in each Eurovision Young Musicians. View source data.

The table lists the participating countries in each decade since the first Eurovision Young Musicians was held in 1982.

Table key
#	Debutant	The country made its debut during the decade.
1	Winner	The country won the contest.
2	Second place	The country was ranked second.
3	Third place	The country was ranked third.
X	Remaining places	The country placed from fourth to last in the final.
†	Non-qualified for the final	The country did not qualify for the final. (1986–2018)
W	Disqualified or withdrawn	The country was to participate in the contest, but was disqualified or withdrew.
C	Cancelled	The contest was cancelled after the announcement of participating countries. (2020)
U	Upcoming	The country has confirmed participation for the next contest, however, the contest has yet to take place.
	No entry	The country did not enter the contest.

=== 1980s ===
1982–1988
Country	1982	1984	1986	1988
Austria #	Х	Х	†	1
Belgium #			†	†
Cyprus #				†
Denmark #			†	†
Finland #		2	3	X
France #	2	Х	1	†
Germany #	1	Х	†	X
Ireland #			†	†
Israel #			†	
Italy #			†	3
Netherlands #		1	†	†
Norway #	Х		†	2
Portugal			W	
Spain #				†
Sweden #			†	†
Switzerland #	3	X	2	†
United Kingdom #	Х	3	X	X
Yugoslavia #			X	†

=== 1990s ===
1990–1998
Country	1990	1992	1994	1996	1998
Austria	Х	Х	†	2	1
Belgium	3	3	†	†	
Croatia #			†		2
Cyprus	†	†	†	†	†
Denmark	†	Х	Х		
Estonia #			X	3	†
Finland	†	Х	Х	†	Х
France	Х	†	†	X	
Germany	2	†	†	1	†
Greece #	†		†	†	†
Hungary #		†	X		
Ireland	†	†	†	†	†
Italy	†				
Latvia #			2	Х	Х
Lithuania #			†		
Macedonia #			†		
Netherlands	1	†			
Norway	†	Х	†	Х	†
Poland #		1	†	X	†
Portugal #	†	†	†	†	†
Russia #			†	†	
Slovakia #					X
Slovenia #			†	†	X
Spain	†	2	†	†	†
Sweden	†	†	3		X
Switzerland	†	†	Х	Х	†
United Kingdom	†	Х	1	†	3
Yugoslavia	†	†			

=== 2000s ===
2000–2008
Country	2000	2002	2004	2006	2008
Albania			W		
Austria	X	1	1	Х	†
Belgium	†		†	†	
Bulgaria #				†	
Croatia	†	†	†	†	†
Cyprus	†	†	†	†	†
Czech Republic #	†	X		†	
Denmark	†	†			
Estonia	†	†	X		
Finland	2	†	†	†	2
France	X				
Germany	†	X	2		†
Greece	†	X	†	†	1
Hungary	X				
Ireland	†				
Italy		†			
Latvia	†	†			
Netherlands	X	†	†	†	X
Norway	X	†	X	2	3
Poland	1	X	X	†	†
Romania #		†	†	X	†
Russia	3	†	3	3	X
Serbia #					†
Serbia and Montenegro #				†	
Slovenia	†	3	†	†	X
Spain	†				
Sweden	†	†	†	1	†
Switzerland	†	†	X	X	
Turkey #	†				
Ukraine #					†
United Kingdom	†	2	†	X	X

=== 2010s ===
2010–2018
Country	2010	2012	2014	2016	2018
Albania #					†
Armenia #		3			
Austria	†	2	1	3	
Belarus #	X	X			
Belgium					†
Bosnia and Herzegovina #		†			
Croatia	X	†	X	X	†
Cyprus	†				
Czech Republic	†	X	X	2	X
Estonia					†
Georgia #		†			
Germany	X	X	X	X	X
Greece	†	†	X		†
Hungary			3	X	X
Israel					†
Malta #			X	X	†
Moldova #			X		
Netherlands	†	†	X		
Norway	2	1	X	X	X
Poland	X	X	X	1	†
Portugal			X		
Romania	†				
Russia	3				1
San Marino #				X	†
Slovenia	1	†	2	X	2
Spain					†
Sweden	†		X	X	†
Ukraine		†			
United Kingdom	†				†

=== 2020s ===
2020–2027
Country	~~2020~~ (Note: The 2020 contest was cancelled due to the COVID-19 pandemic.)	2022	2024	2026	2027
Armenia			X	3	
Austria		X	1		
Belgium		X	X	X	U
Croatia	C	X			
Cyprus				X	
Czechia	C	1	X	X	U
Estonia	C				
France		X	X		
Germany	C	2	3	X	U
Greece	C				
Lithuania					U
Latvia				2	U
Malta	C				
Norway	C	3	X		
Poland	C	X	X	1	
Portugal				X	U
Serbia			X	X	
Slovenia	C				
Sweden	C	X	2	X	
Switzerland			X	X	
Ukraine	C				

== Broadcast in non-participating countries ==
Country	Broadcaster(s)	Year(s)
Australia	Special Broadcasting Service (SBS)	1986
Australia	Unknown	2004
Canada	TV5 Québec Canada	1992, 1998
Canada	Unknown	2004
Iceland	Ríkisútvarpið (RÚV)	1996, 2002, 2008–2012

== List of winners ==
=== By contest ===
Year	Date	Host city	No.	Winner	Performer	Instrument	Piece
1982	11 May	(United Kingdom) Manchester	6	Germany	Markus Pawlik	Piano	Piano Concerto No.1 by Felix Mendelssohn
1984	22 May	(Switzerland) Geneva	7	Netherlands	Isabelle van Keulen	Violin	Violin concert no. 5 op. 37 by Henri Vieuxtemps
1986	27 May	(Denmark) Copenhagen	15	France	Sandrine Lazarides	Piano	Piano Concerto E flat by Franz Liszt
1988	31 May	(Netherlands) Amsterdam	16	Austria	Julian Rachlin	Violin	Concerto for violin and orchestra in d, op.22 by Henryk Wieniawski
1990	29 May	(Austria) Vienna	18	Netherlands	Niek van Oosterum	Piano	Concert for Piano and Orchestra a-minor op. 16, 1 Mov. by Edvard Grieg
1992	9 June	(Belgium) Brussels	18 (Note: The official list of performers in the preliminary round is unknown.)	Poland	Bartłomiej Nizioł	Violin	Concerto for violin and orchestra in d major op. 77 by Johannes Brahms
1994	14 June	(Poland) Warsaw	24	United Kingdom	Natalie Clein	Cello	Cello Concerto in E minor, op. 85, part I by Edward Elgar
1996	12 June	(Portugal) Lisbon	22	Germany	Julia Fischer	Violin	Havanaise in E major, op. 83 by Camille Saint-Saëns
1998	4 June	(Austria) Vienna	18	Austria	Lidia Baich	Violin	Violin Concerto no. 5, 1st Mov. by Henri Vieuxtemps
2000	15 June	(Norway) Bergen	24	Poland	Stanisław Drzewiecki	Piano	Piano Concerto in E minor, op. 11, 3rd movement by Frederic Chopin
2002	19 June	(Germany) Berlin	20	Austria	Dalibor Karvay	Violin	Carmen Fantasie by Franz Waxman
2004	27 May	(Switzerland) Lucerne	17	Austria	Alexandra Soumm	Violin	Violin Concerto No.1 (1st Movement) by Niccolò Paganini
2006	12 May	(Austria) Vienna	18	Sweden	Andreas Brantelid	Cello	Concerto for Violoncello and Orchestra, 1st movement by Joseph Haydn
2008	9 May	(Austria) Vienna	16	Greece	Dionysis Grammenos	Clarinet	Concerto for Clarinet and Orchestra, 4th movement by Jean Françaix
2010	14 May	(Austria) Vienna	15	Slovenia	Eva Nina Kozmus	Flute	Concerto for flute, III. mov. Allegro scherzando by Jacques Ibert
2012	11 May	(Austria) Vienna	14	Norway	Eivind Holtsmark Ringstad	Viola	Viola concerto, 2 & 3 mov. by Béla Bartók
2014	31 May	(Germany) Cologne	14	Austria	Ziyu He	Violin	2. Violinkonzert by Béla Bartók
2016	3 September	(Germany) Cologne	11	Poland	Łukasz Dyczko	Saxophone	Rhapsody pour Saxophone alto by André Waignein
2018	23 August	(United Kingdom) Edinburgh	18	Russia	Ivan Bessonov	Piano	3rd mvt from Piano Concerto No. 1 by Pyotr Ilyich Tchaikovsky
2022	23 July	(France) Montpellier	9	Czech Republic	Daniel Matejča	Violin	3rd and 4th mvt Violin Concerto No. 1 by Dmitri Shostakovich
2024	17 August	(Norway) Bodø	11	Austria	Leonhard Baumgartner	Violin	Violin Concerto No. 5 in A minor, 1st movement by Henri Vieuxtemps
2026	6 June	(Armenia) Yerevan	11	Poland	Michał Stochel	Accordion	Concerto Classico, 3rd movement by Mikołaj Majkusiak

=== By country ===
Map showing each country's number of Young Musicians gold medal wins up to and including 2022.

The table below shows the top-three placings from each contest, along with the years that a country won the contest.

Country	1st place, gold medalist(s)	2nd place, silver medalist(s)	3rd place, bronze medalist(s)	Total	Years won
Austria	6	2	1	9	1988; 1998; 2002; 2004; 2014; 2024
Poland	4	0	0	4	1992; 2000; 2016; 2026
Germany	2	2	1	5	1982; 1996
Netherlands	2	0	0	2	1984; 1990
Norway	1	3	2	6	2012
Slovenia	1	2	1	4	2010
United Kingdom	1	1	2	4	1994
Sweden	1	1	1	3	2006
Czechia	1	1	0	2	2022
France	1	1	0	2	1986
Russia	1	0	4	5	2018
Greece	1	0	0	1	2008
Finland	0	3	1	4	—N/a
Latvia	0	2	0	2	—N/a
Switzerland	0	1	1	2	—N/a
Croatia	0	1	0	1	—N/a
Spain	0	1	0	1	—N/a
Armenia	0	0	2	2	—N/a
Belgium	0	0	1	1	—N/a
Estonia	0	0	1	1	—N/a
Hungary	0	0	1	1	—N/a
Italy	0	0	1	1	—N/a

== See also ==
- List of countries in Eurovision Choir
- List of countries in the Eurovision Dance Contest
- List of countries in the Eurovision Song Contest
- List of countries in the Eurovision Young Dancers
- List of countries in the Junior Eurovision Song Contest
