= Eurovision Young Musicians 2016 =

Classical music competition

Coordinates: 50.9413°N 6.9583°E

Date and venue
- Final: 3 September 2016
- Venue: Cologne Cathedral; Cologne, Germany

Organisation
- Organiser: European Broadcasting Union (EBU)
- Executive supervisor: Jon Ola Sand

Production
- Host broadcaster: Westdeutscher Rundfunk (WDR)
- Executive producer: Tanja Nagel
- Musical director: Clemens Schuldt
- Presenters: Daniel Hope; Tamina Kallert

Participants
- Number of entries: 11
- Debuting countries: San Marino
- Non-returning countries: Greece; Moldova; Netherlands; Portugal
- Participation map: Competing countries Countries that participated in the past but not in 2016

Vote
- Voting system: Each juror awarded a mark from 1–10 to each performer
- Winning musician: Poland; Łukasz Dyczko

Eurovision Young Musicians 2016 was the 18th edition of Eurovision Young Musicians, held on 3 September 2016 outside the Cologne Cathedral in Cologne, Germany, and presented by Daniel Hope and Tamina Kallert. It was organised by the European Broadcasting Union (EBU) and host broadcaster Westdeutscher Rundfunk (WDR). The WDR Symphony Orchestra Cologne conducted by Clemens Schuldt accompanied all competing performers. This was the second consecutive edition hosted by WDR.

Musicians representing eleven countries participated in the contest, with San Marino making their debut, while Greece, Moldova, Netherlands, and Portugal decided not to participate in this edition. A five-person jury decided which of the participants would be awarded with the top-three prizes.

The winner was saxophonist Łukasz Dyczko representing Poland, with pianist Robert Bílý representing the Czech Republic placing second, and double bassist Dominik Wagner representing Austria placing third. Dyczko is the first saxophone player to win the competition.

== Location ==
Locations of the bidding countries. The eliminated countries are marked in red. The chosen host country is marked in blue.

=== Bidding phase ===
Two cities were interested in hosting the 2016 edition of Eurovision Young Musicians, Budapest and Cologne. Following the bid presentations to the contest's Steering Group members, representatives of Norwegian broadcaster Norwegian Broadcasting Corporation (NRK), Dutch broadcaster Omroep NTR (NTR) and Slovenian broadcaster Radiotelevizija Slovenija (RTVSLO) decided to award the hosting of the 2016 contest to Cologne and the German broadcaster Westdeutscher Rundfunk (WDR).

=== Host city announcement ===
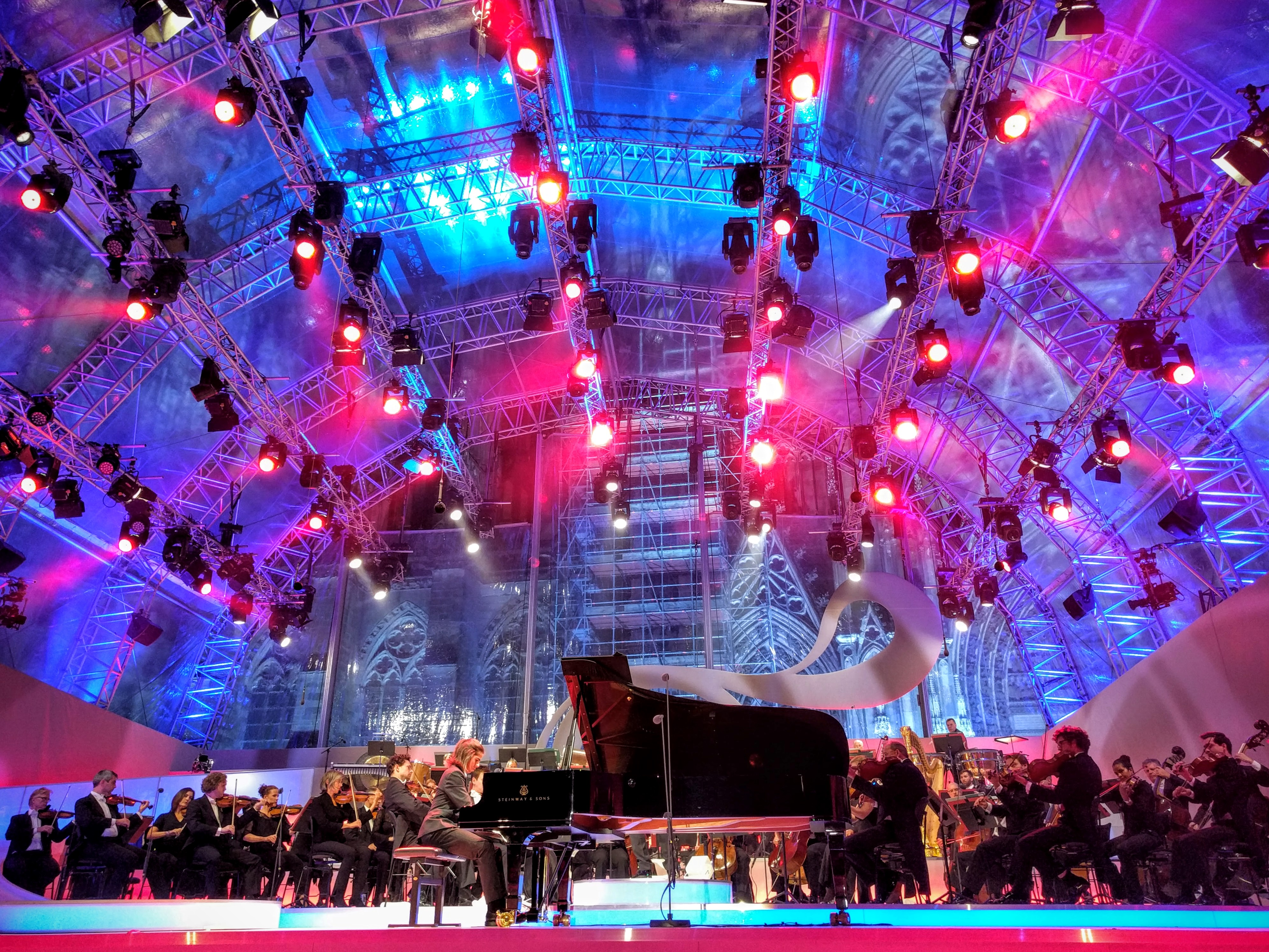
The contest was held on an open-air stage outside Cologne Cathedral, Cologne.

It was announced on 9 December 2014, that the 2016 contest would take place at the Cologne Cathedral in Cologne, Germany on 3 September 2016. This was the second consecutive time that the German city had hosted the Young Musicians, with the last being Eurovision Young Musicians 2014. This was the sixth time that the competition was held on an open-air stage. It was also the third time that Germany had been the host nation, with their first in Berlin for Eurovision Young Musicians 2002.

== Format ==
Each of the eleven participants performed a piece of up to six minutes in length, which was judged by a five-person professional jury. Each of the jurors commented on the performances after each participant had finished their piece, adding to the interaction during the show. After all of the performances, the jury then awarded points to each participant, with the total scores being used to decide the winner. Prizes were awarded to the first, second, and third placed participants. WDR Symphony Orchestra Cologne, conducted by Clemens Schuldt, accompanied each of the eleven the participating musicians during their performances.

=== Presenters ===
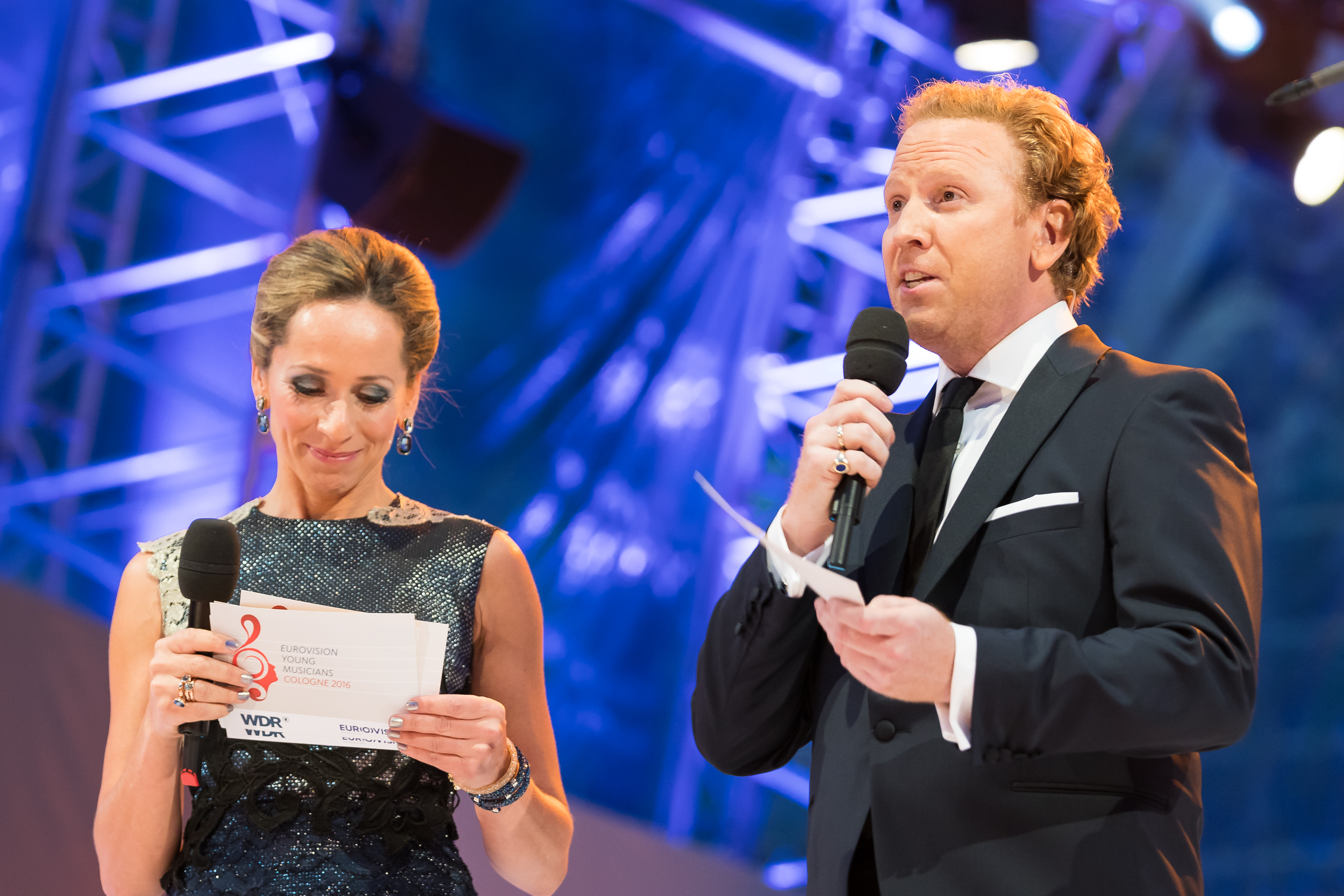
Daniel Hope and Tamina Kallert, hosts of Eurovision Young Musicians 2016.

On 28 April 2016, it was announced by the EBU and host broadcaster WDR that Daniel Hope and Tamina Kallert would be the presenters for the eighteenth edition of the Young Musicians contest. Hope is better known as a British classical violinist who is of German descent, won the prize for young British classical performer of the year at the Classic Brit Awards in 2004. and more recently was awarded the 2015 European Cultural Prize for Music, presented at the Dresden Frauenkirche in October 2015. Kallert started her career with WDR in 1995 as a journalist and television host for the German broadcaster, and has presented programmes including the German travel show, Wunderschön!.

=== Jury members ===
The list of jury members are as follows:

- Julian Rachlin (chairman) – Winner of Eurovision Young Musicians 1988 representing Austria.
- Jonathan Cohen – artistic director and founder of the British early music ensemble Arcangelo.
- Tine Thing Helseth – Runner-up at Eurovision Young Musicians 2006 representing Norway, and winner of the 2013 Echo Klassik Young Artist of the Year.
- Andreas Martin Hofmeir – Austrian tubist and winner of the 2013 Echo Klassik Instrumentalist of the Year; also wrote the song "Nackert" performed by LaBrassBanda which finished in second place at Unser Song für Malmö, the national selection programme for Germany in the Eurovision Song Contest 2013.
- Alice Sara Ott – German-Japanese pianist and winner of the 2010 Echo Klassik Young Artist of the Year.

== Participants and results ==
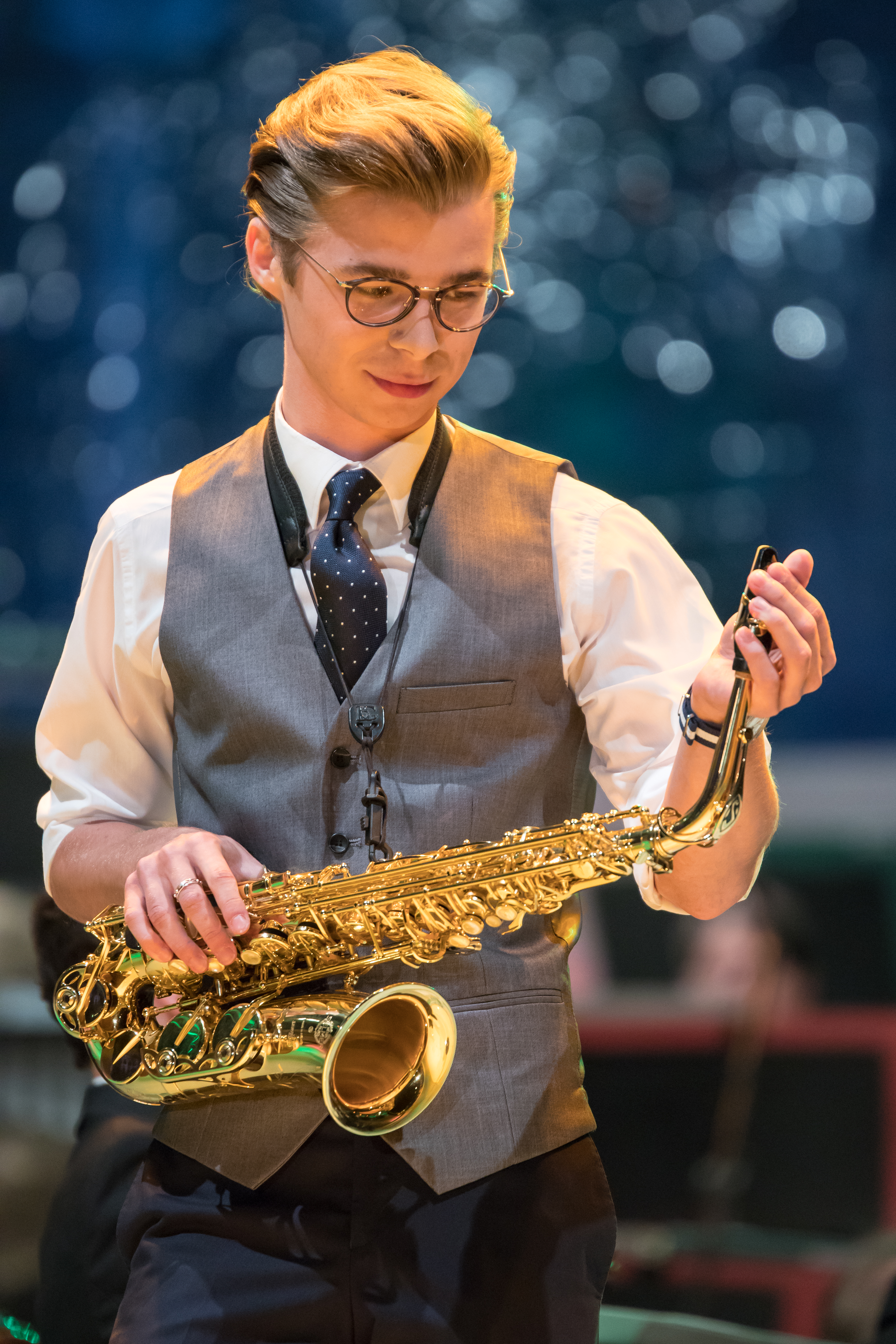
2016 winner, Łukasz Dyczko

The following countries participated in the 2016 contest. The semi final elimination stage of the contest was expected to return this year, with the first semi final scheduled to take place on 28 August 2016 and the second on 29 August, and the final on 3 September 2016. Under this proposed format, a maximum of fifteen countries could take part in the contest. However the semi-finals were later removed due to the low number of participating countries. Only eleven countries participated in the contest, the lowest number since 1984. San Marino made their debut at Eurovision Young Musicians. Greece, Moldova, Netherlands and Portugal withdrew from this year's competition.

=== Finalists ===
The Grand Final was held on 3 September 2016. Awards were given to the top three countries. The third-place musician received €3,000, second-place €7,000, and the winner €10,000 and a solo concert performance with the WDR Symphony Orchestra Cologne. The table below highlights these using gold, silver, and bronze. The placing results of the remaining participants is unknown and never made public by the European Broadcasting Union.

Participants and results
| R/O | Country | Broadcaster | Performer(s) | Instrument | Piece(s) | Composer(s) | Pl. |
|---|---|---|---|---|---|---|---|
| 1 | Hungary | Duna | Jakab Roland Attila | Violin | Zigeunerweisen, op. 20, 1st mov. | Pablo de Sarasate | |
| 2 | Malta | TVM | Dmitry Ishkhanov | Piano | Piano Concerto No. 3, op. 50, Allegro Molto | Dmitry Kabalevsky | |
| 3 | Austria | ORF | Dominik Wagner | Double bass | Concerto for Double Bass and Orchestra, Allegro with cadenza | Serge Koussevitzky | 3 |
| 4 | Poland | TVP | Łukasz Dyczko | Saxophone | Rhapsody pour Saxophone alto | André Waignein | 1 |
| 5 | Sweden | SVT | Eliot Nordqvist | Piano | Piano Concerto No. 2, op. 22, Andante sostenuto | Camille Saint-Saëns | |
| 6 | Slovenia | RTVSLO | Zala Vidic | Cello | Variations on a Rococo Theme, VI: Andante, VII e coda: Allegro Vivo | Pyotr Ilyich Tchaikovsky | |
| 7 | Croatia | HRT | Marko Martinović | Tamburica | Meditationen (from the opera Thaïs) | Jules Massenet | |
| 8 | San Marino | SMRTV | Francesco Stefanelli | Cello | Cello Concerto Nr. 1, Allegretto | Dmitri Shostakovich | |
| 9 | Germany | WDR | Raul Maria Dignola | Horn | Horn Concerto no. 2, Allegro Maestoso | Wolfgang Amadeus Mozart | |
| 10 | Czech Republic | ČT | Robert Bílý | Piano | Piano Concerto, op. 38, Allegro Molto | Samuel Barber | 2 |
| 11 | Norway | NRK | Ludvig Gudim | Violin | Carmen Fantasie | Franz Waxman | |

== Broadcasting ==
The following countries, listed in order of broadcasting dates, confirmed that they will broadcast the contest along with the dates of broadcasting schedules.

| Date of broadcast | Country | Station |
|---|---|---|
| 3 September 2016 | Croatia | HRT 3 |
| 3 September 2016 | Czech Republic | ČT art |
| 3 September 2016 | Germany | WDR Fernsehen (15-minute delay) |
| 3 September 2016 | Germany | One (15-minute delay) |
| 3 September 2016 | Germany | WDR 3 |
| 3 September 2016 | Hungary | Duna |
| 3 September 2016 | Malta | TVM2 |
| 3 September 2016 | Norway | NRK2 |
| 3 September 2016 | Poland | TVP Kultura |
| 3 September 2016 | Rest of the world | youngmusicians.tv |
| 3 September 2016 | Slovenia | TV SLO 2 |
| 3 September 2016 | Sweden | SVT2 |
| 4 September 2016 | San Marino | SMRTV |
| 11 September 2016 | Austria | ORF 2 |

== Other countries ==
For a country to be eligible for potential participation in Eurovision Young Musicians, it needs to be an active member of the European Broadcasting Union (EBU). It is unknown whether the EBU issue invitations of participation to all 56 active members like they do for the Eurovision Song Contest and Junior Eurovision Song Contest. The EBU Active Members listed below have made the following announcements in regards to their decisions.

=== Active EBU Members ===
- Belgium – On 20 October 2015, the Flemish broadcaster Vlaamse Radio- en Televisieomroeporganisatie (VRT) announced that they had no plans to return in 2016. Belgium last participated at the 2006 Young Musicians event.
- Cyprus – On 18 October 2015, Cyprus Broadcasting Corporation (CyBC) announced that they will not participate at the event. Cyprus last participated at the 2010 Young Musicians event.
- Greece – Greek broadcaster, Hellenic Broadcasting Corporation (ERT) withdrew from the 2016 edition, after last participating at Eurovision Young Musicians 2014 with no reasons for their withdrawal being published.
- Israel – On 19 October 2015, Israel Broadcasting Authority (IBA) announced that they will not participate at the event. Israel's last, and only, participation was at the 1986 Young Musicians event.
- Latvia – On 15 October 2015, the Latvian broadcaster Latvijas Televīzija (LTV) announced that they would not take part in the 2016 event. Latvia last participated at the 2004 Young Musicians event.
- Moldova – Moldavian broadcaster, TeleRadio-Moldova (TRM) withdrew from the 2016 edition, after last participating at Eurovision Young Musicians 2014 with no reasons for their withdrawal being published.
- Netherlands – Dutch broadcaster, Nederlandse Omroep Stichting (NOS) withdrew from the 2016 edition, after last participating at Eurovision Young Musicians 2014 with no reasons for their withdrawal being published.
- Portugal – Portuguese broadcaster, Rádio e Televisão de Portugal (RTP) withdrew from the 2016 edition, after last participating at Eurovision Young Musicians 2014 with no reasons for their withdrawal being published.

== See also ==
- Eurovision Song Contest 2016
- Junior Eurovision Song Contest 2016
