= Eurovision Young Musicians 2026 =

Televised classical music competition

- Հայաստան. վայր, որտեղ դասական երաժշտությունը միավորում է Armenia: Where Classical Music Unites

Date and venue
- Final: 6 June 2026
- Venue: Yerevan Opera Theatre; Yerevan, Armenia

Organisation
- Organiser: European Broadcasting Union (EBU)

Production
- Host broadcaster: Public Television Company of Armenia (AMPTV)
- Director: Artur Manukyan; Mushegh Minasyan
- Executive producer: Anushik Ter-Ghukasyan
- Musical director: Eduard Topchjan
- Presenters: Hamlet Arakelyan; Hrachuhi Utmazyan

Participants
- Number of entries: 11
- Returning countries: Cyprus; Latvia; Portugal
- Non-returning countries: Austria; France; Norway
- Participation map: Competing countries Countries that participated in the past but not in 2026

Vote
- Voting system: Each juror awards a mark from 1–10 to each performer based on specific criteria
- Winning musician: Poland; Michał Stochel

Eurovision Young Musicians 2026 was the 22nd edition of Eurovision Young Musicians, held on 6 June 2026 at the Yerevan Opera Theatre in Yerevan, Armenia, and presented by Hamlet Arakelyan and Hrachuhi Utmazyan. It was organised by the European Broadcasting Union (EBU) and host broadcaster Public Television Company of Armenia (AMPTV). The Armenian Philharmonic Orchestra conducted by Eduard Topchjan accompanied all competing performers.

The winner was accordionist Michał Stochel representing Poland, with marimbist Sonja Misiņa representing Latvia placing second, and flautist Elen Virabyan representing Armenia placing third. Stochel is the first accordionist to win the competition. It is also Poland's fourth win in the competition, after 1992, 2000, and 2016.

== Location ==
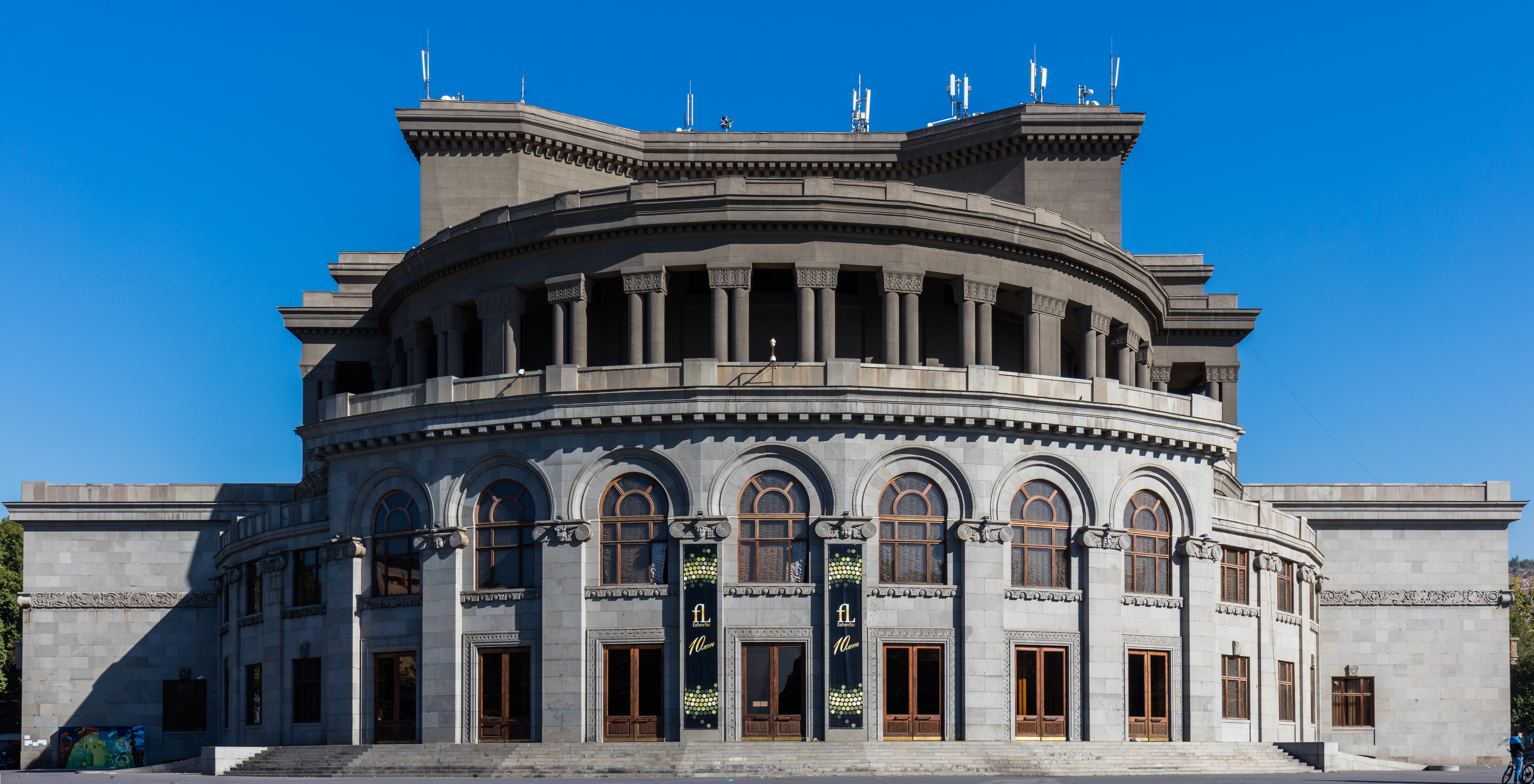
Yerevan Opera Theatre, host venue for Eurovision Young Musicians 2026

On 21 October 2024, the European Broadcasting Union (EBU) announced that Eurovision Young Musicians 2026 would take place in Yerevan, the capital city of Armenia. The announcement came after the Public Television Company of Armenia (AMPTV) made a return to the contest in 2024, marking its first participation in the contest in twelve years. This was the first time that Eurovision Young Musicians was hosted in Armenia, as well as the first Eurovision event held in the country since the Junior Eurovision Song Contest 2022.

In March 2026, Radio Television of Serbia (RTS) reported that the contest would take place in the Yerevan Opera Theatre, officially known as the Alexander Spendiaryan National Academic Opera and Ballet Theatre. The contest was held during the year marking the 100th anniversary of the Yerevan Opera Theatre building. Screens were installed outside the venue in order to broadcast the concert live, allowing larger audiences to follow the event from public viewing areas.

== Format ==
The contest took place on 6 June 2026, accompanied by the Armenian Philharmonic Orchestra and the Symphony Orchestra of the Yerevan Opera Theatre. Soviet Armenian composer Aram Khachaturian was celebrated during the event, which was held on his birthday and featured several of his pieces throughout the show. During each performance, works of art from the represented country were displayed on screen in the background. The winner received the contest trophy and an invitation to perform with the Armenian National Philharmonic Orchestra during the 2026–2027 concert season. It was reported that the Armenian government had allocated about ֏665 million (USD$1.6 million) to cover organisational, technical and production costs related to hosting the event.

=== Visual design ===
The competition’s branding is inspired by Armenian painter Minas Avetisyan's "Jajur". A slogan was introduced for the first time and was revealed as Armenia: Where Classical Music Unites.

=== Presenters ===
On 2 June 2026, AMPTV announced that television presenters Hamlet Arakelyan and Hrachuhi Utmazyan would be the hosts of the twenty-second edition of the competition. Arakelyan and Utmazyan are known for being the Armenian commentators for the Eurovision Song Contest.

=== Interval act ===
Titled "A Second, That’s 40 Minutes", the interval act combined symphonic music, ballet dancing, acrobatics and visual effects through emblematic works by Khachaturian such as Spartacus, Gayane and Masquerade Suite.

=== Jury members ===
The jurors of the competition were first announced on 12 May 2026 during a press conference held in Yerevan that was attended by Hovhannes Movsisyan, the executive director of the host broadcaster, and the Minister of Education, Science, Culture and Sports, Zhanna Andreasyan. The jury consisted of:

- Roman Simović (chair), conductor of the London Symphony Orchestra
- Armenian cellist Narek Hakhnazaryan
- German conductor Julien Salemkour
- Spanish flutist Eduard Belmar.

== Participants and results ==
As was the case in 2024, the EBU's senior project manager and official representative for Eurovision Young Musicians Amelie Rossignol-Farjon announced that a maximum of eleven countries may participate in the contest. The EBU justified this step in order to maintain the presentation schedule and the event’s duration. There is space for ten broadcasters from other countries alongside the host country's broadcaster. However, in January 2026, it was revealed that the EBU was considering expanding the number of participants to twelve.

On 27 February 2026, the EBU announced that broadcasters from eleven countries would participate. Cyprus, Latvia and Portugal are returning after last participating in 2010, 2002 and 2014, respectively, while France, Norway and reigning champion Austria opted not to participate after doing so the previous edition. The 2026 contest marked the first appearance of Cyprus in a televised final and the marimba as a competing instrument, played by both Simon Nakhimovitch of Belgium and Sonja Misiņa of Latvia.

Participants and results of Eurovision Young Musicians 2026
R/O	Country	Broadcaster	Performer	Instrument	Piece(s)	Composer(s)	Pl.	Ref(s)
1	Germany	WDR	Moë Dierstein	Violin	Violin Concerto in E minor, 3rd mvt	Felix Mendelssohn		
2	Cyprus	CyBC	Iakovos Kedaritis	Clarinet	Clarinet Concerto No. 1 in F minor, Op. 73, 3rd mvt	Carl Maria von Weber		
3	Belgium	RTBF	Simon Nakhimovitch	Marimba	Introduction and Rondo Capriccioso	Camille Saint-Saëns		
4	Serbia	RTS	Jana Jakovljević	Violin	Zigeunerweisen	Pablo de Sarasate		
5	Switzerland	SRF	Manoush Toth	Piano	Piano Concerto in A minor, Op. 7, 3rd mvt	Clara Schumann		
6	Armenia	AMPTV	Elen Virabyan	Flute	Violin Concerto transposed for flute	Aram Khachaturian	3	
7	Poland	TVP	Michał Stochel	Accordion	Concerto Classico, 3rd mvt	Mikołaj Majkusiak	1	
8	Portugal	RTP	Beatriz Li Rosão	Violin	Violin Concerto in D major, 3rd mvt	Erich Wolfgang Korngold		
9	Latvia	LSM	Sonja Misiņa	Marimba	Marimba Concerto, Op. 12, 2nd mvt	Emmanuel Séjourné	2	
10	Czechia	ČT	Nora Lubbadová	Piano	Piano Concerto No. 2 in F major, Op. 102, 3rd mvt	Dmitri Shostakovich		
11	Sweden	SVT	Edward Ahlbeck Glader	Piano	Piano Concerto No. 2 in G minor, Op. 16, 4th mvt	Sergei Prokofiev		

=== Other countries ===
- Austria – On 2 December 2025, Martin Traxl, head of the culture department at ORF, confirmed that the broadcaster would not participate due to scheduling conflicts.
- Norway – On 17 October 2025, the press department of NRK confirmed that, for the first time since 1986, it would not participate in the contest. Ragnhild Veire, head of NRK Klassisk explained, that the broadcaster prefers to focus on further developing its national contest Virtuos, which has served as the Norway's national final for Eurovision Young Musicians since 2006. NRK Klassisk has stressed that "by this decision it wants to implement a broader initiative aimed at promoting Norwegian classical music talent, providing young musicians in the country with an even stronger platform for their development".

Active EBU member broadcasters in Croatia, Greece, Ireland, Spain, Slovenia and the United Kingdom (BBC) confirmed their non-participation prior to the announcement of the participants list by the EBU.

== Broadcasts ==
All participating broadcasters may choose to have on-site or remote commentators providing insight and voting information to their local audience. Some broadcasters aired the show live on 6 June 2026 at 18:00 CEST, with others moving the broadcast to other time slots or other dates. The interval act was omitted from delayed broadcasts of the competition.

Broadcasters and commentators in participating countries
Country	Date of broadcast	Time	Channel(s)	Commentator(s)	Ref(s)
Armenia	6 June	Live	First Channel	Anna Avanesyan	
Belgium	6 June	19:00 CET	Musiq'3	Caroline Veyt and Pierre Solot	
Belgium	6 June	21:50 CET	La Trois	Caroline Veyt and Pierre Solot	
Cyprus	6 June	Live	RIK 2, CyBC Fourth Channel	Aris Antoniades	
Czechia	6 June	20:15 CET	ČT art	Jiří Vejvoda and Petra Křížková	
Latvia	6 June	21:10 CET (Note: Broadcast from 19:00 CET on the content player REplay.lv and the portal LSM.lv)	LTV1, Latvijas Radio 3	Eva Johansone	
Poland	6 June	19:00 CET	TVP Kultura, TVP Kultura 2	Robert Kamyk and Sylwia Janiak-Kobylińska	
Portugal	6 June	Live	RTP2, RTP Antena 2	André Cunha Leal	
Serbia	6 June	19:00 CET	RTS 3, Radio Belgrade 2, Radio Belgrade 3	Tijana Lukić	
Sweden	6 June	19:00 CET	SVT 2	Henrik von Sydow	
Switzerland	6 June	22:10 CET	SRF 1	Beatrice Kern	
Switzerland	7 June	16:00 CET	Radio SRF 2 Kultur	Patricia Moreno	
Switzerland	7 June	21:00 CET	RTS 2	Unknown	
Germany	14 June	07:15 CET (Note: Broadcast from 18:30 CET on video streaming service ARD Mediathek)	WDR Fernsehen	Daniel Finkernagel	

== See also ==
- Eurovision Song Contest 2026
- Junior Eurovision Song Contest 2026
- Eurovision Song Contest Asia 2026
