= Sitruk =

Sitruk is a surname. Notable people with the surname include:

- Éric Sitruk (born 1978), French football player
- Florence Sitruk (born 1974), harpist
- Joseph Sitruk (1944–2016), Chief Rabbi of France
- Jules Sitruk (born 1990), French actor
- Olivier Sitruk (born 1970, French comedian and actor
