= New Century Chamber Orchestra =

- Orchestra
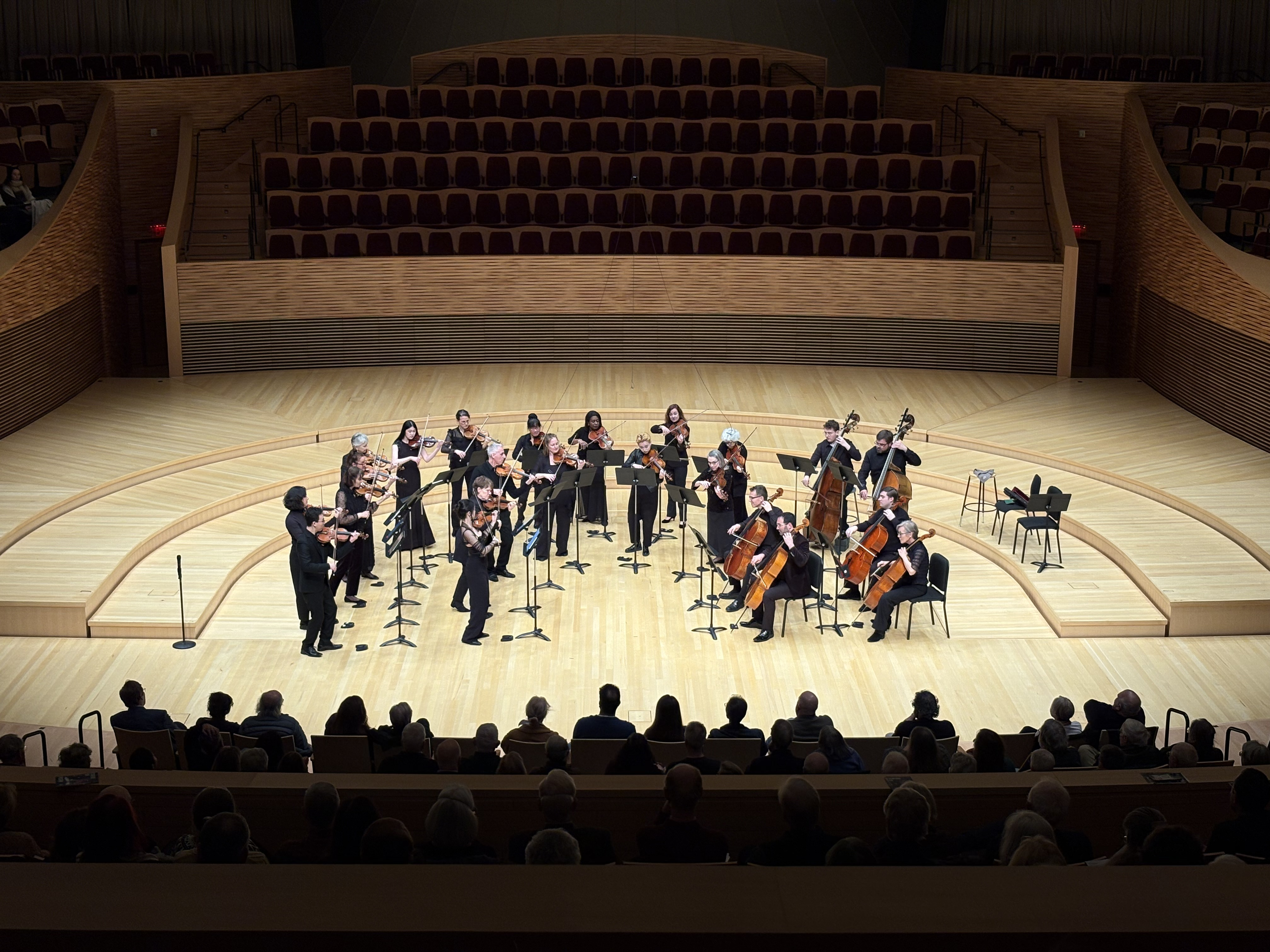
- New Century Chamber Orchestra performing at Stanford University
- Short name: New Century
- Founded: 1992
- Location: San Francisco, California
- Music director: Daniel Hope
- Website: www.ncco.org

The New Century Chamber Orchestra was founded in 1992 by cellist Miriam Perkoff and violist Wieslaw Pogorzelski. The goal of the founders was to present classical music in a fresh and unique way in the San Francisco Bay Area. The music director chooses the programs and guides the artistic vision and leads the seventeen members of the orchestra as part of a conductorless orchestra. Musical decisions are made collaboratively, in the goal of enhancing the level of commitment on the part of the musicians and increasing the precision, passion and power of their playing.

In addition to performing classic pieces of chamber orchestra repertoire, New Century commissions new works, revives neglected works from the past, and brings pieces from other genres such as jazz and rock into the chamber orchestra setting. New Century's mission is to bring outstanding chamber orchestra performances to Bay Area communities. They perform in intimate venues in four cities: Berkeley, Palo Alto, San Francisco and San Rafael.

== Former music directors ==
Stuart Canin served as New Century's first music director from 1992 to 1999, and formerly as Concertmaster of the San Francisco Symphony, the San Francisco Opera, and the Los Angeles Opera under music director James Conlon and general director Plácido Domingo. He also served as concertmaster of the New Japan Philharmonic in the 1990s, performing and touring under Seiji Ozawa and Mstislav Rostropovich. Mr. Canin was born in New York City and studied at Juilliard, where his principal teacher was Ivan Galamian. Mr. Canin won the International Paganini Competition in Genoa and the Handel Medal from the city of New York. He served as concertmaster in Hollywood for studio orchestras, performing on such films as Schindler's List, Titanic and Forrest Gump. Mr. Canin was scheduled return to the NCCO in April 2008 to lead a program of Shostakovich, Mendelssohn, and Mozart.

A native of Menlo Park, California, Krista Bennion Feeney served as New Century's music director and concertmaster from 1999 to 2006. She is currently concertmaster of the Mostly Mozart Festival at Lincoln Center during the summer and co-concertmaster of the Orchestra of St. Luke's year-round at Carnegie Hall and throughout the summer at the Caramoor Festival in Katonah, New York. Ms. Feeney has performed as a soloist with the Orchestra of St. Luke's, the St. Louis Symphony, the San Francisco Symphony, the New York String Orchestra in Carnegie Hall, the Kennedy Center, the Brandenburg Ensemble and the Elgin Symphony Orchestra, among others. As a member of the Loma Mar quartet, she recorded new quartet compositions by Paul McCartney for his 1999 CD entitled Working Classical (EMI Records). She was a student of Isadore Tinkelman and Stuart Canin's at the San Francisco Conservatory, and later studied with Jaime Laredo and Felix Galimer at the Curtis Institute of Music.

American violinist Nadja Salerno-Sonnenberg served as New Century's music director from 2008 to 2017. Her professional career began in 1981 when she won the Walter W. Naumburg International Violin Competition. In 1983 she was recognized with an Avery Fisher Career Grant, and in 1999, she was honored with the prestigious Avery Fisher Prize. Nadja Salerno-Sonnenberg was born in Rome and immigrated to the United States at the age of eight to study at The Curtis Institute of Music. She later studied with Dorothy DeLay at The Juilliard School. In addition to her solo career with orchestras all over the world, she has hosted the Backstage/Live from Lincoln Center program for PBS and was the subject of the 2000 Academy Award-nominated film, Speaking in Strings, a documentary on her life, which premiered at the Sundance Film Festival. Further TV interview appearances include 60 Minutes, The Tonight Show with Johnny Carson and The Charlie Rose Show. She currently serves as extraordinary faculty and director of Chamber Orchestra Loyola University, College of Music and Fine Arts, New Orleans after previously serving as resident artist.

== Current music director ==
British violinist Daniel Hope has performed as a soloist, chamber artist, artistic director and recording artist for over 25 years. He has served as an exclusive Deutsche Grammophon artist since 2007 and his recordings have been awarded the Deutsche Schallplattenpreis, the Diapason d’Or of the Year, the Edison Classical Award, the Prix Caecilia, six ECHO-Klassik Awards and GRAMMY nominations. In the 2016–2017 season, Hope succeeded Sir Roger Norrington as music director of the Zurich Chamber Orchestra and in 2019 he began his appointment as the artistic director of the Dresden Frauenkirche. The 2019 season was Hope's last as associate director of the Savannah Music Festival after serving for 16 years.

== Recordings ==
The orchestra has released seven compact discs. Three albums were recorded with Nadja Salerno-Sonnenberg on her own NSS Music Label including Together (November 2009) LIVE: Barber, Strauss, Mahler (November 2010) and A to Z: 21st Century Concertos (May 2014). Other recordings include a 1996 collaborative project with Kent Nagano and the Berkeley Symphony Orchestra featuring the work of 20th-century Swiss composer Frank Martin, and Written With the Heart’s Blood, a 1997 Grammy Award finalist featuring works by Dimitri Shostakovich, both on the New Albion label. A year later, the orchestra recorded and released Echoes of Argentina, featuring works of Argentine composers Alberto Williams and Alberto Ginastera on the d’Note label. In 2004, the orchestra recorded and released Oculus, a CD of Kurt Rohde's compositions on the Mondovibe label. In 2009, the orchestra recorded and released Together featuring works by Astor Piazzolla and 2008–2009 Featured Composer Clarice Assad on the NSS Music label. All of the recordings have been distributed both internationally and in the United States.

== Touring ==
In February 2011, New Century toured nationally across the Midwest, East Coast and Southern California. In January and February 2013, the orchestra toured nationally throughout eight states including Kentucky, Tennessee, South Carolina, North Carolina, Virginia, Maryland, Illinois and Michigan. In June 2019, the orchestra embarked on its first international tour across Germany and Poland with performances at Philharmonie Essen, Essen; Grand Hotel, Heiligendamm; Filharmonia Szczecin, Szczecin; Festspiele Mecklenburg-Vorpommern, Ulrichshusen, Stolpe & Schwerin; Stiftung Frauenkirche Dresden, Dresden; Kissinger Sommer, Bad Kissingen; and Schleswig-Holstein Musik Festival, Rendsburg/Budelsdorf.

== Highlights ==
In December 1996, mezzo-soprano Frederica von Stade performed at the group's season opening with a new piece by composer Jake Heggie, entitled On the Road to Christmas, written specifically for von Stade.

In 2000, New Century performed in a multimedia multi-ethnic collaboration with Chinese composer Gang Situ entitled Strings Calligraphy. The composition examines the parallels between string music and calligraphy, the control of the erhu bow and calligraphy paintbrush and musical renderings and the flow of calligraphy on paper. The uses of shape and line—dance, string instruments and visual imagery— were interwoven as elements of the performance. Chinese characters were projected on downstage screens, as dancers on a platform imitated the shape of the characters.

Sir Simon Rattle conducted the New Century Chamber Orchestra's 10th Anniversary Celebration concert in June 2002 in a co-presentation with Marin Academy. He led the orchestra in music by Elgar, Schoenberg and Mozart. This was only the second time that Rattle had conducted in the Bay Area since 1980.

In January 2008, the New Century Chamber Orchestra performed REWIND at Yerba Buena Center for the Arts, a sold out special event conceived of and conducted by Paul Haas. The concert traced music backwards in time from the 20th century to the Baroque and featured violinist Anne Akiko Meyers, DJ Mason Bates, and kinetic installation artist Reuben Heyday Margolin.

New Century Chamber Orchestra celebrated its 25th anniversary during the 2016–2017 season which also featured the orchestras first-ever festival. Three unique concerts were presented in San Francisco that highlighted Nadja Salerno-Sonnenberg in her final appearances as music director.

In May 2018, New Century Chamber Orchestra presented the West Coast Premiere of Philip Glass's Piano Concerto No. 3 as part of the composer's 80th birthday celebrations. Simone Dinnerstein, for whom the work was written, featured as soloist.

In January 2020, New Century Chamber Orchestra made its debut at the newly renovated Presidio Theatre with its second festival titled "Beethoven in the Presidio." The two-day festival featured orchestral and chamber works by Beethoven as part of the global celebrations honoring the composer's 250th birthday. Music Director Daniel Hope, pianist Simone Dinnerstein and cellist Lynn Harrell featured as soloists.

== Education and community outreach ==
New Century is committed to being a vital part of the community and to educational outreach in the communities where it performs. Through its "Hall Pass" initiative, the orchestra offers free performance and rehearsal access to students and at-risk seniors at schools and service organizations throughout the Bay Area.

== Orchestra members ==
Daniel Hope, music director

Violin

- Daniel Hope, concertmaster
- Dawn Harms, associate concertmaster
- Candace Guirao, principal second
- Robin Mayforth
- Anna Presler
- Karen Shinozaki Sor
- Iris Stone
- Deborah Tien Price
- Michael Yokas

Viola

- Anna Kruger, principal
- Cassandra Lynne Richburg
- Jenny Douglass
- Elizabeth Prior

Cello

- Robin Bonnell
- Michelle Djokic
- Isaac Melamed

Bass

- Anthony Manzo, principal
