= Aris Antoniades =

Greek-Cypriot composer

- Antoniades conducting in 2025

Background information
- Born: Aris Antoniades; December 2, 1991 (age 34); Limassol, Cyprus
- Genres: Classical, Musical Theater, Film
- Occupations: Composer, Arranger, Orchestrator, Music Director
- Instrument: Piano
- Years active: 2013–present
- Website: https://www.arisantoniades.com/

Aris Antoniades (Greek: Άρης Αντωνιάδης; born December 2, 1991) is a Greek-Cypriot composer, arranger, orchestrator, and music director. His work spans concert music, theater, film, orchestral arranging, and popular-music productions. His collaborations have included ensembles such as the Oxford Philharmonic Orchestra and the ERT National Radio Symphony Orchestra, as well as artists including Bobby Sanabria, George Hatzinassios, Alkistis Protopsalti, Stefanos Korkolis, Michalis Hatzigiannis, George Perris, and Earl Carpenter. Since 2021, he has served as artistic director and principal conductor of the TrakArt Pops Orchestra.

== Early life and education ==
Antoniades was born and raised in Limassol, Cyprus, and began taking piano lessons at age five. After being awarded a scholarship from the Fulbright Commission, he moved to the United States, where he completed his bachelor's and master's degrees in classical composition at the Manhattan School of Music in New York City, receiving the Provost's Award for Academic Excellence upon graduation. He later completed his Ph.D. in Education at Saint Louis University, Missouri.

== Musical career ==
Antoniades has written for orchestra, chamber ensembles, jazz ensembles, theater, and film. His orchestral work Chiaroscuro was premiered at Riverside Church under conductor George Manahan and was subsequently recorded and broadcast by the Hellenic Broadcasting Corporation. Nostos, for saxophone and piano, was commissioned by the University of Sydney and the HD Duo and appeared on the ensemble's 2021 album Music of the Commonwealth, released by Da Vinci Classics. His Toccata & Fugue for Organ was performed at the Cathedral of St. John the Divine in New York City, while the saxophone work Two Childhood Portraits was recorded by saxophonist Lukas Hopkins and pianist Er-Hsuan Li and released in 2024 by Soundset Recordings.

His work for jazz ensembles has included big-band compositions influenced by Cypriot traditional music, presented at events such as the Kypria International Festival. Antoniades's arrangement of Lalo Schifrin's Mission: Impossible Theme was performed by Bobby Sanabria at Dizzy's Club at Jazz at Lincoln Center.

Film and theater also form part of Antoniades' output. His screen credits include seven short films, while his theater work includes the original score for the Greek experimental play Women of Soil (Greek: Γυναίκες από Χώμα).

In 2024, Antoniades served as the orchestrator and music director of Alkistis Protopsalti’s concert tour The Songs I’ve Grown to Love. The collaboration with Protopsalti continued in subsequent concert productions.

The following year, he prepared orchestral arrangements of songs by Mikis Theodorakis for a centenary tribute performed by the Oxford Philharmonic Orchestra at Cadogan Hall in London under conductor Marios Papadopoulos.

Antoniades was also the music director and orchestrator for West End & Beyond, a concert production featuring West End and Broadway performers including Earl Carpenter, Holly-Anne Hull, Lauren Byrne, James Hume, and Niall Sheehy.

== Artistic Direction and Broadcasting ==
Since 2021, Antoniades has served as artistic director and principal conductor of the TrakArt Pops Orchestra in Cyprus, overseeing its artistic programming and leading large-scale concert productions with artists from Cyprus, Greece, and the U.K. He also presents Musical Compass, a weekly program on CyBC Classic Radio (88.2 FM). In 2026 he served as the Cypriot television commentator for the Eurovision Young Musicians competition on CyBC.
