= Daniel Hope =

South Africa-born classical violinist

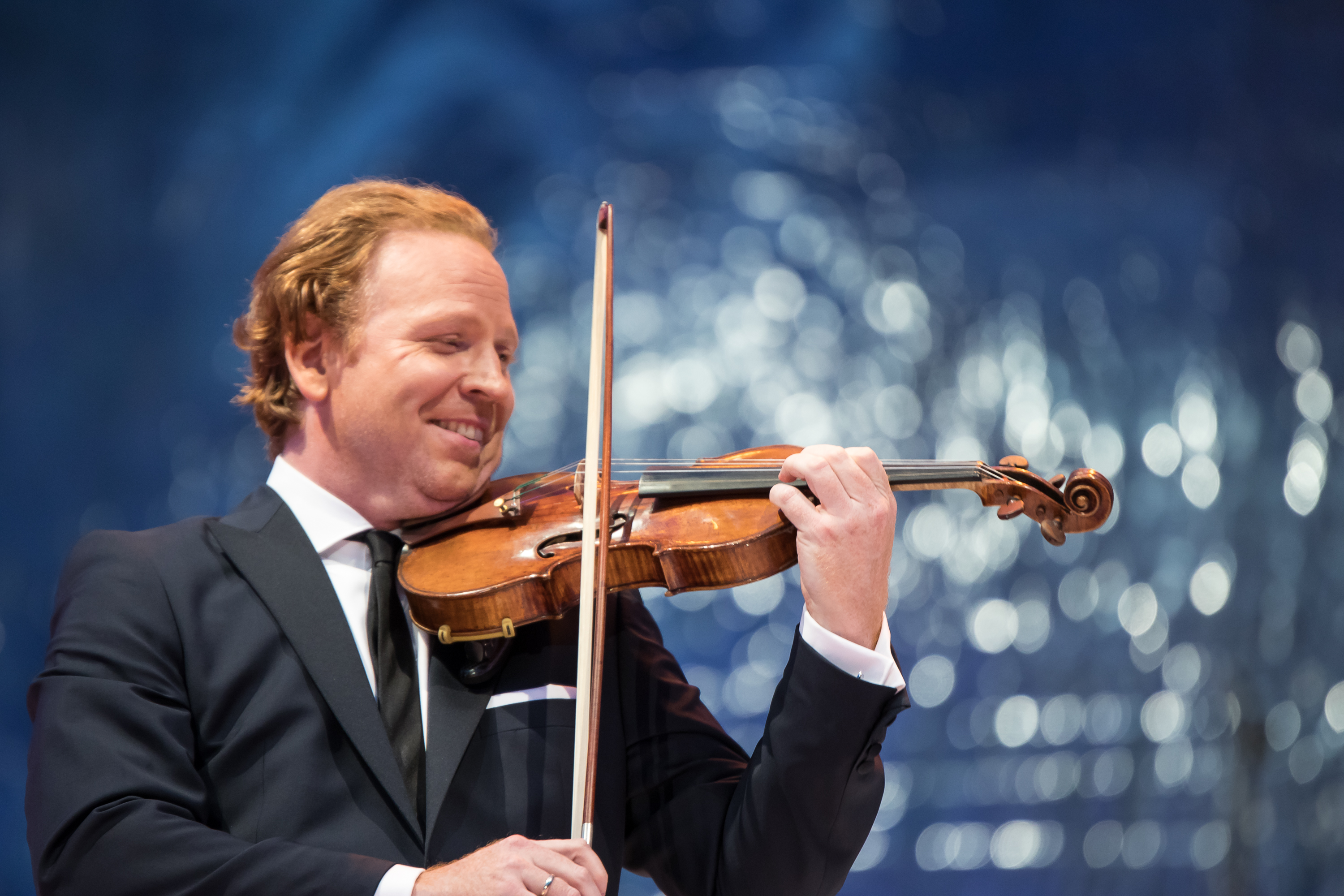
- Hope playing the violin at the Eurovision Young Musicians 2016 rehearsals
- Born: 17 August 1973 (age 53); Durban, South Africa
- Education: Highgate School; Yehudi Menuhin School; Royal Academy of Music (DipRAM)
- Occupation: Classical violinist
- Parent(s): Christopher Hope and Eleanor Hope
- Awards: Order of Merit of the Federal Republic of Germany

Daniel Hope (born 17 August 1973) is a South African-born classical violinist. He has appeared internationally as a concerto soloist, chamber musician, recording artist, broadcaster and artistic director, and has been an exclusive artist of Deutsche Grammophon since 2007.

== Early life and education ==
Hope was born in Durban, South Africa, and is of Irish and Jewish German descent, his maternal grandparents, formerly from Berlin, having escaped Nazism. His father is the novelist Christopher Hope, FRSL, and his mother Eleanor Hope worked as an assistant to Yehudi Menuhin. When Hope was six months old, his family moved from South Africa to London, England, because of his father's anti-apartheid views. In the UK, Hope was educated at Highgate School and studied at the Yehudi Menuhin School in Stoke d'Abernon, Surrey.

Hope later studied at the Royal Academy of Music with Zakhar Bron, Itzhak Rashkovsky and Felix Andrievsky, and gained a diploma (DipRAM) and fellowship (FRAM). In 2011, he was appointed visiting professor in violin by the Royal Academy of Music.

== Career ==
Hope became the violinist of the Beaux Arts Trio in 2002. His burgeoning career led to his decision to leave the Beaux Arts Trio, which in turn led to the decision to disband the ensemble. The Beaux Arts Trio, with Hope as the final violinist in the history of the ensemble, gave its final concerts in August 2008.

Hope has served as an associate artistic director of the Savannah Music Festival. In April 2015, he was named the new music director of the Zurich Chamber Orchestra, effective in 2016. On 16 March 2018, at the conclusion of a joint performance by the Zurich Chamber Orchestra and New Century Chamber Orchestra at which he served as concertmaster, Hope was announced as the latter ensemble's new music and artistic director.

In 2019, he became artistic director of the Frauenkirche Dresden. In 2020, he became president of the Beethoven-Haus Bonn, succeeding Tabea Zimmermann and following predecessors in the role that included Joseph Joachim and Kurt Masur. In 2025, Hope became artistic director of the Gstaad Menuhin Festival and Academy.

Hope has appeared at venues and festivals including Carnegie Hall, the Sydney Opera House, the BBC Proms, Salzburg, Tanglewood, the Schleswig-Holstein Musik Festival and Gstaad. He has worked regularly with orchestras in Berlin, Boston, Chicago, Sofia, London, Los Angeles, Paris and Tokyo.

Hope has collaborated with conductors including Yehudi Menuhin, Roger Norrington, Thomas Hengelbrock, Christoph Eschenbach, Simon Rattle, Vladimir Jurowski, Iván Fischer, Christian Thielemann, Daniel Geiss and Nayden Todorov.

In 2017, Hope was awarded the Cross of the Order of Merit of the Federal Republic of Germany for his merits in the musical constitution of commemorative culture.

Hope plays the 1737 Guarneri "ex-Lipinski" violin.

=== As a presenter ===
Daniel Hope presented the 2013 documentary film The Secrets of the Violin, which explored the history of violin making from Amati, Stradivari and Guarneri to modern makers such as Samuel Zygmuntowicz.

Hope and Tamina Kallert were the presenters for the Eurovision Young Musicians 2016 in Cologne, Germany on 3 September 2016.

==== Hope@Home (2020) ====
In March 2020, in response to the COVID-19 pandemic, Hope began a series of more than 100 live concerts broadcast on Arte. Under the title "Hope@Home", These broadcasts reached an audience of millions, and earned an Opus Klassik award, Sonderpreis der Jury für besondere Leistungen. The project began as house concerts filmed at his home in Berlin. Appearing with him were artists, often well known, who were also living in the city.

===== Hope@Home on Tour =====
With the easing of lockdown in the summer of 2020, it became possible to move the concerts out of Hope's home to other locations under the title "Hope@Home on Tour", before the series came to a temporary halt.

===== Hope@Home Next Generation =====
In November 2020, as social distancing tightened across Europe with the second wave of the pandemic, the series resumed in Hope's living room, this time with a focus on young performers, as "Hope@Home Next Generation". In mid-November, the Hope@Home team travelled to San Francisco, where Hope worked with the New Century Chamber Orchestra and other artists. Returning to Berlin, the series continued into December 2020.

== Personal life ==
Hope is in his second marriage, to the painter Silvana Kaiser. The couple lived in Vienna and moved to Berlin in 2016. He holds Irish and German nationality.

== Discography ==
Hope has recorded commercially for Deutsche Grammophon since 2007.

Recent releases include Music for a New Century with the New Century Chamber Orchestra, issued by Deutsche Grammophon in 2023 and including works by Philip Glass, Tan Dun, Mark-Anthony Turnage and Jake Heggie. In 2024, Hope released Dance! with the Zurich Chamber Orchestra and Irish Roots, a Deutsche Grammophon album combining Irish traditional material and classical repertoire, with collaborators including Lúnasa, Siobhán Armstrong, James Galway, Jeanne Galway, Rea Garvey, Ross Daly, Simos Papanas and the Thessaloniki State Symphony Orchestra conducted by Daniel Geiss.

=== Selected recordings ===
- Violin Concertos – Alban Berg, Benjamin Britten.
- East Meets West.
- Shostakovich: Violin Concertos Nos. 1 and 2.
- Mendelssohn, with the Chamber Orchestra of Europe conducted by Thomas Hengelbrock.
- Vivaldi.
- Recomposed by Max Richter: Vivaldi – The Four Seasons.
- For Seasons.
- America.
- Music for Ukraine, with Alexey Botvinov.
- Silvestrov, with Alexey Botvinov.
- Music for a New Century, with the New Century Chamber Orchestra.
- Dance!, with the Zurich Chamber Orchestra.
- Irish Roots.

=== Awards for recordings ===
Hope has been recognised in the Echo Klassik awards, Germany's major classical music award until its renaming in 2018, and its successor award Opus Klassik.

- 2004: ECHO Klassik: Newcomer of the Year (Violin Concertos – Alban Berg, Benjamin Britten)
- 2006: ECHO Klassik: Chamber Music Recording of the Year (East Meets West)
- 2006: ECHO Klassik: Musician of the Year (Dmitri Shostakovich, Violin Concertos 1 & 2)
- 2008: ECHO Klassik: Concert Recording of the Year (Mendelssohn with Chamber Orchestra of Europe, conductor Thomas Hengelbrock)
- 2009: ECHO Klassik: Concert Recording of the year (Vivaldi)
- 2013: ECHO Klassik: Classic without Borders (Recomposed by Max Richter)
- 2017: ECHO Klassik: Classic without Borders (For Seasons)
- 2021: Opus Klassik: Special award

Cultural offices
Preceded by Roger Norrington	Music Director, Zurich Chamber Orchestra; 2016–present	Succeeded by incumbent
Preceded by Nadja Salerno-Sonnenberg	Music Director, New Century Chamber Orchestra; 2018–present	Succeeded by incumbent
Preceded by Christoph Müller	Artistic Director, Gstaad Menuhin Festival and Academy; 2025–present	Succeeded by incumbent
