= Eurovision Young Musicians 2027 =

Televised classical music competition

Date and venue
- Final: 10 July 2027
- Venue: Great Amber Concert Hall; Liepāja, Latvia

Organisation
- Organiser: European Broadcasting Union (EBU)
- Host broadcaster: Latvian Public Service Media (LSM)

Participants (provisional; as of November 2026)
- Intend on participating: 7
- Returning countries: Lithuania
- Participation map: Countries which have provisionally confirmed their participation in 2027 Countries which have participated in past editions

Eurovision Young Musicians 2027 is set to be the 23rd edition of Eurovision Young Musicians, to be held on 10 July 2027 at the Great Amber Concert Hall in Liepāja, Latvia. It is being organised by the European Broadcasting Union (EBU) and host broadcaster Latvian Public Service Media (LSM).

== Location ==
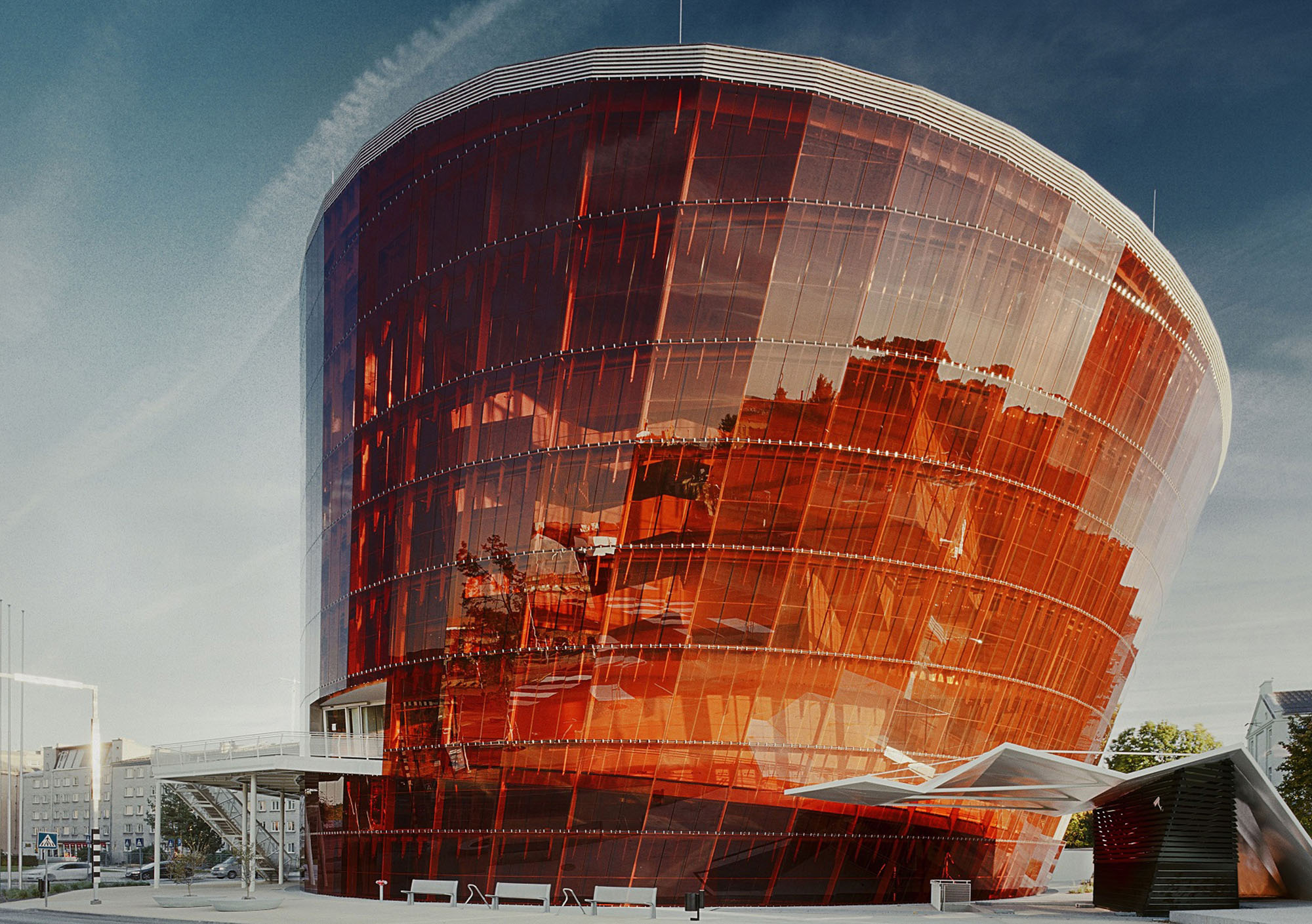
Great Amber Concert Hall in Liepāja, host venue of the 2027 edition

On 6 June 2026, during the final of Eurovision Young Musicians 2026, the EBU announced that Latvian Public Service Media (LSM) would host the 2027 edition at the Great Amber Concert Hall in Liepāja, Latvia. This will be the first time Eurovision Young Musicians is held in Latvia and the first Eurovision event to take place in the country since Eurovision Choir of the Year 2017. The competition will form part of the events programme during the city's tenure as European Capital of Culture.

== Format ==
The 2027 edition marks the first time Eurovision Young Musicians has been held in consecutive years since its inception in 1982. According to the EBU, this was due to high interest among member broadcasters. It was initially announced by RTBF, that the event would be held annually starting in 2027, but this was later clarified to be a one-off arrangement, with the regular biennial schedule to resume thereafter.

== Participants ==
As of October 2026, broadcasters from the following countries have publicly confirmed their intention to participate in the 2027 contest. Lithuania is set to return 33 years after its debut and only appearance in 1994.

Eurovision Young Musicians 2027 participants
Country	Broadcaster	Performer	Instrument	Piece(s)	Composer(s)	Ref.
Belgium	RTBF	TBD 25 January 2027				
Czechia	ČT					
Germany	WDR					
Latvia	LSM					
Lithuania	LRT					
Portugal	RTP					
Sweden	SVT	TBD 5 January 2027				

=== Other countries ===
EBU member broadcasters in Bosnia and Herzegovina, Finland, Moldova, Montenegro, Norway, San Marino, Slovenia, Spain, and the United Kingdom (BBC) confirmed non-participation prior to the announcement of the participants list by the EBU.

- Cyprus – the country is expected to participate as returning countries must compete in two consecutive editions under new rules introduced ahead of the 2026 contest. In July 2026, its broadcaster CyBC announced its commitment to participating in all three EBU music competitions, including Eurovision Young Musicians; however, an official confirmation is pending.

== Broadcasts ==
All participating broadcasters may choose to have on-site or remote commentators providing insight and voting information to their local audience.

Broadcasters and commentators in participating countries
Country	Channel(s)	Commentator(s)	Ref(s)
Belgium	La Trois	TBA	
Belgium	Musiq'3	TBA	

== See also ==
- Eurovision Song Contest 2027
- Junior Eurovision Song Contest 2027
