= Eurovision Young Musicians 1988 =

1988 Eurovision young version

Dates and venue
- Semi-final 1: 26 May 1988
- Semi-final 2: 27 May 1988
- Final: 31 May 1988
- Venue: Concertgebouw; Amsterdam, Netherlands

Organisation
- Organiser: European Broadcasting Union (EBU)
- Executive supervisor: Frank Naef

Production
- Host broadcaster: Nederlandse Omroep Stichting (NOS)
- Director: Klaas Rusticus
- Executive producer: Stefan Felsenthal
- Musical director: Sergiu Comissiona
- Presenter: Martine Bijl

Participants
- Number of entries: 16
- Number of finalists: 6
- Debuting countries: Cyprus; Spain
- Non-returning countries: Israel
- Participation map: Finalist countries Countries eliminated in the preliminary round Countries that participated in the past but not in 1988

Vote
- Voting system: Jury chose their top 3 favourites by vote.
- Winning musician: Austria; Julian Rachlin

Eurovision Young Musicians 1988 was the 4th edition of Eurovision Young Musicians. It consisted of two semi-finals on 26 and 27 May and a final on 31 May 1988, held at Concertgebouw in Amsterdam, Netherlands, and presented by Martine Bijl. It was organised by the European Broadcasting Union (EBU) and host broadcaster Nederlandse Omroep Stichting (NOS). The Radio Filharmonisch Orkest conducted by Sergiu Comissiona accompanied all competing performers.

Musicians representing sixteen countries took part in the competition, with six of them participating in the televised final. Cyprus and Spain made their début, however Israel decided not to participate.

The winner was violinist Julian Rachlin representing Austria, with pianist Leif Ove Andsnes representing Norway placing second, and violinist Domenico Nordio representing Italy placing third.

== Location ==
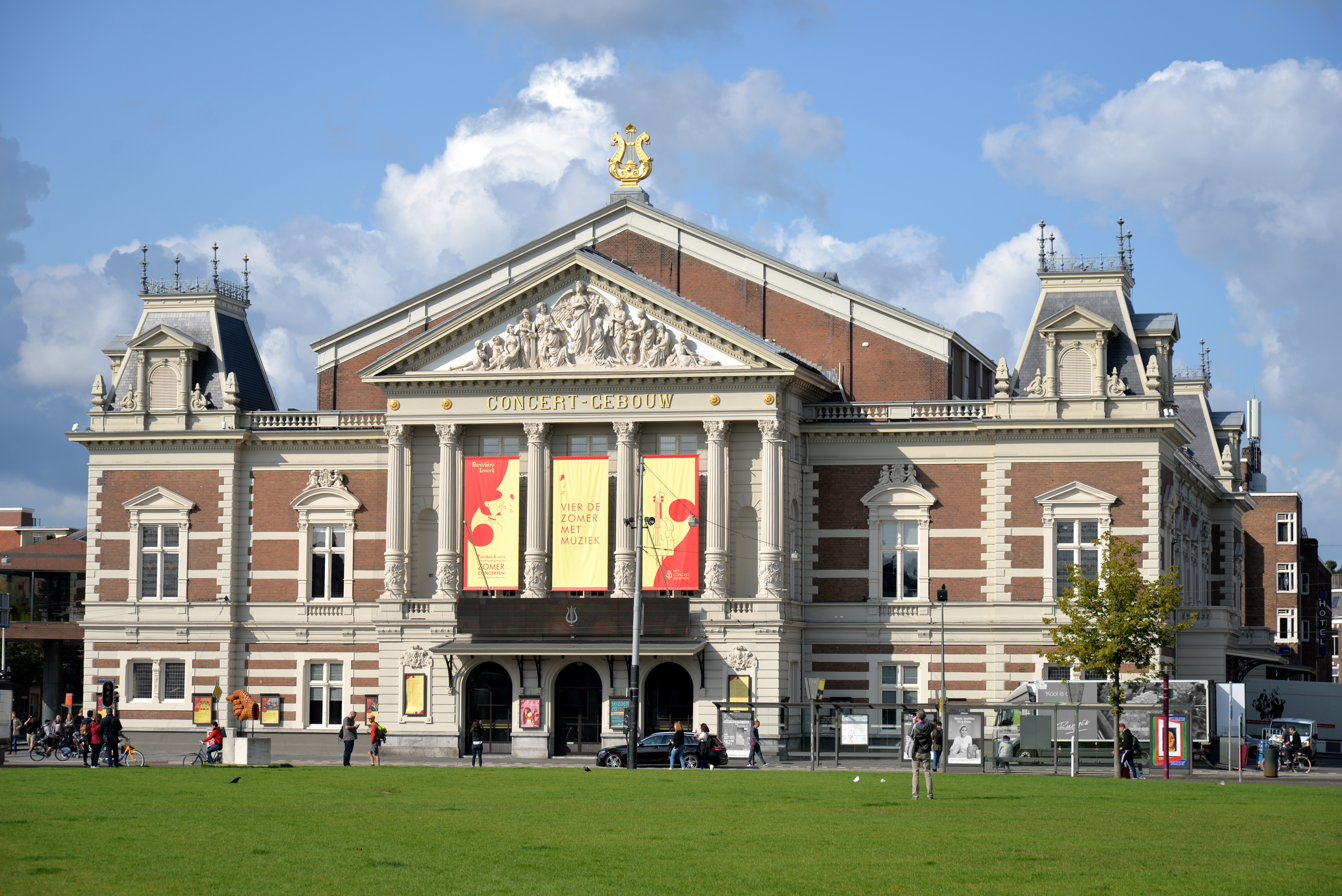
Concertgebouw, Amsterdam. Venue of Eurovision Young Musicians 1988.

The Concertgebouw (also known as the "Royal Concertgebouw") a concert hall in Amsterdam, Netherlands, was the host venue for the 1988 edition of Eurovision Young Musicians.

The Dutch term "concertgebouw" literally translates into English as "concert building". On 11 April 2013, on occasion of the building's 125th anniversary, Queen Beatrix bestowed the Royal Title "Koninklijk" upon the building, as she did previously on to the Royal Concertgebouw Orchestra. Because of its highly regarded acoustics, the Concertgebouw is considered one of the finest concert halls in the world, along with places such as Boston's Symphony Hall and the Musikverein in Vienna.

== Format ==
Martine Bijl was the host of the 1988 contest. Each participating country were able to send male or female artists who were no older than 19 years of age, to represent them by playing a classical piece of their choice accompanied by the Radio Filharmonisch Orkest conducted under Sergiu Comissiona. Queen Beatrix of the Netherlands was a special guest at the contest.

== Participants and results ==
=== Preliminary round ===
Broadcasters from sixteen countries took part in the preliminary round of the 1988 contest, of which six qualified to the televised grand final. The following participants failed to qualify.

Country	Broadcaster	Performer	Instrument	Piece	Composer
Belgium	RTBF	Eliane Reyes	Piano	Piano Concerto in D, Op. 21	Joseph Haydn
Cyprus	CyBC	Plotinos Mikromatis	Piano	Konzertstück in F, Op. 79	Carl Maria von Weber
Denmark	DR	Nikolaj Znaider	Violin	Violin Concerto No. 5	Henri Vieuxtemps
France	FR3	Henri Demarquette	Cello	Variations on a Rococo Theme, Op. 23	Pyotr Ilyich Tchaikovsky
Ireland	RTÉ	Dearbhla Collins	Piano	Piano Concerto No. 3 in C, Op. 26	Sergei Prokofiev
Netherlands	NOS	Wibi Soerjadi	Piano	Piano Concerto No. 2 in C	Sergei Rachmaninov
Spain	TVE	José Ramon Mendez	Piano	Piano Concerto No. 1, in E flat	Franz Liszt
Sweden	SVT	Henrik Peterson	Violin	Violin Concerto No. 5	Henri Vieuxtemps
Switzerland	SRG SSR	David Riniker	Cello	Variations on a Rococo Theme, Op. 23	Pyotr Ilyich Tchaikovsky
Yugoslavia	JRT	Violeta Smailovic	Violin	Violin Concerto No. 3 in C, Op. 61	Camille Saint-Saëns

=== Final ===
Awards were given to the top three participants. The table below highlights these using gold, silver, and bronze. The placing results of the remaining participants is unknown and never made public by the European Broadcasting Union.

Participants and results
R/O	Country	Broadcaster	Performer(s)	Instrument	Piece(s)	Composer(s)	Pl.
1	Finland	YLE	Jan Söderblom	Violin	Violin Concerto No. 5 in A, KV 219	Wolfgang Amadeus Mozart	
2	United Kingdom	BBC	David Pyatt	Horn	Horn Concerto No. 1 in E flat, Op.11	Richard Strauss	
3	Italy	RAI	Domenico Nordio	Violin	Violin Concerto in d, Op.47	Jean Sibelius	3
4	Germany	ZDF	Nikolai Schneider	Cello	Cello Concerto No. 1 in a, Op.33	Camille Saint-Saëns	
5	Austria	ORF	Julian Rachlin	Violin	Violin Concerto No. 2 in d, Op.22	Henryk Wieniawski	1
6	Norway	NRK	Leif Ove Andsnes	Piano	Piano Concerto No. 3 in C, Op.26	Sergei Prokofiev	2

== Jury members ==
The jury members consisted of the following:

- Denmark – Anette Faaborg (Note: Faaborg hosted the 1986 contest)
- Finland – Osmo Vänskä
- France – Pascal Rogé
- Germany – Elmar Weingarten
- Italy – Roberto Benzi (President)
- Netherlands – Marco Riaskoff
- Netherlands – Herman Krebbers
- Sweden – Sören Hermansson
- United Kingdom – William Pleeth

== Broadcasts ==
EBU members from the following countries broadcast the final round. It was the first time that commentary boxes were provided in the venue. Known details on the broadcasts in each country, including the specific broadcasting stations and commentators are shown in the tables below.

Broadcasters and commentators in participating countries
Country	Broadcaster	Channel(s)	Commentator(s)	Ref(s)
Austria	ORF	FS2 (Note: Delayed broadcast on 5 June at 11:40 (CEST))		
Belgium	RTBF	Télé 21	Philippe Duposty	
Cyprus	CyBC	RIK		
Denmark	DR	DR TV, DR P2	Niels Oxenvad	
Finland	YLE		Inari Teinilä	
France	FR3 (Note: Delayed broadcast on 4 June at 22:30 (CEST))		Alain Duault	
Germany	3sat			
Ireland	RTÉ		Jane Carly and John O'Connor	
Italy	RAI	Rai Tre (Note: Delayed broadcast on 1 July at 14:10 (CEST))	Ilio Catani	
Netherlands	NOS	Nederland 3, Radio 4		
Norway	NRK	NRK Fjernsynet (Note: Deferred broadcast at 21:45 (CEST))	Sture Rogne	
Spain	TVE	TVE 2	Carlos Usillos	
Sweden	SVT	TV1	Sten Andersson	
Switzerland	SRG SSR	SRG Sportkette	Arthur Godel	
Switzerland	SRG SSR	SSR Chaîne Sportive, RSR 2	Eric Bauer	
Switzerland	SRG SSR	SSR Canale Sportivo	Giusy Boni	
United Kingdom	BBC	BBC2	Humphrey Burton and Jane Glover	
Yugoslavia	JRT	TV Beograd 2, TV Novi Sad, TV Zagreb 2	Milena Miloradović	
Yugoslavia	JRT	TV Ljubljana 2		

Broadcasters and commentators in non-participating countries
Country	Broadcaster	Channel(s)	Commentator(s)	Ref(s)
Czechoslovakia	ČST	Český rozhlas Vltava (Note: Delayed broadcast on 26 January 1989 at 10:20 (WET))		

== See also ==
- Eurovision Song Contest 1988
