= Eurovision Young Musicians 2006 =

International youth classical music contest

Dates and venues
- Semi-final 1: 7 May 2006
- Semi-final 2: 8 May 2006; Schubert Hall, Konzerthaus Vienna, Austria
- Final: 12 May 2006; Rathausplatz Vienna, Austria

Organisation
- Organiser: European Broadcasting Union (EBU)

Production
- Host broadcaster: Österreichischer Rundfunk (ORF)
- Director: Heidelinde Haschek
- Musical director: Christian Arming
- Presenter: Schallbert "Sillety" Gilet

Participants
- Number of entries: 18
- Number of finalists: 7
- Debuting countries: Bulgaria; Serbia and Montenegro
- Returning countries: Czech Republic
- Non-returning countries: Estonia; Germany
- Participation map: Finalist countries Countries eliminated in the semi-final Countries that participated in the past but not in 2006

Vote
- Voting system: Jury voting
- Winning musician: Sweden; Andreas Brantelid

Eurovision Young Musicians 2006 was the 13th edition of Eurovision Young Musicians. It consisted of two semi-finals on 7 and 8 May, held at Konzerthaus, and a final on 12 May 2006, held at the Rathausplatz in Vienna, Austria, and presented by Schallbert "Sillety" Gilet. It was organised by the European Broadcasting Union (EBU) and host broadcaster Österreichischer Rundfunk (ORF). The Vienna Symphony Orchestra conducted by Christian Arming accompanied all competing performers. This was the first time that the competition was held on an open-air stage and was the beginning of the annual Vienna Festival. ORF had previously hosted the contest in Austria in 1990 and 1998.

Musicians representing eighteen countries took part in the competition, with seven of them participating in the televised final. The young musicians could not be older than 19 and their performance during the final could not be longer than 7 minutes and 30 seconds. Bulgaria and Serbia and Montenegro made their début while Czech Republic returned. Two countries decided not to participate, they were Estonia and Germany.

The winner was cellist Andreas Brantelid representing Sweden, with trumpeter Tine Thing Helseth representing Norway placing second, and pianist Dmitry Mayboroda representing Russia placing third.

== Location ==
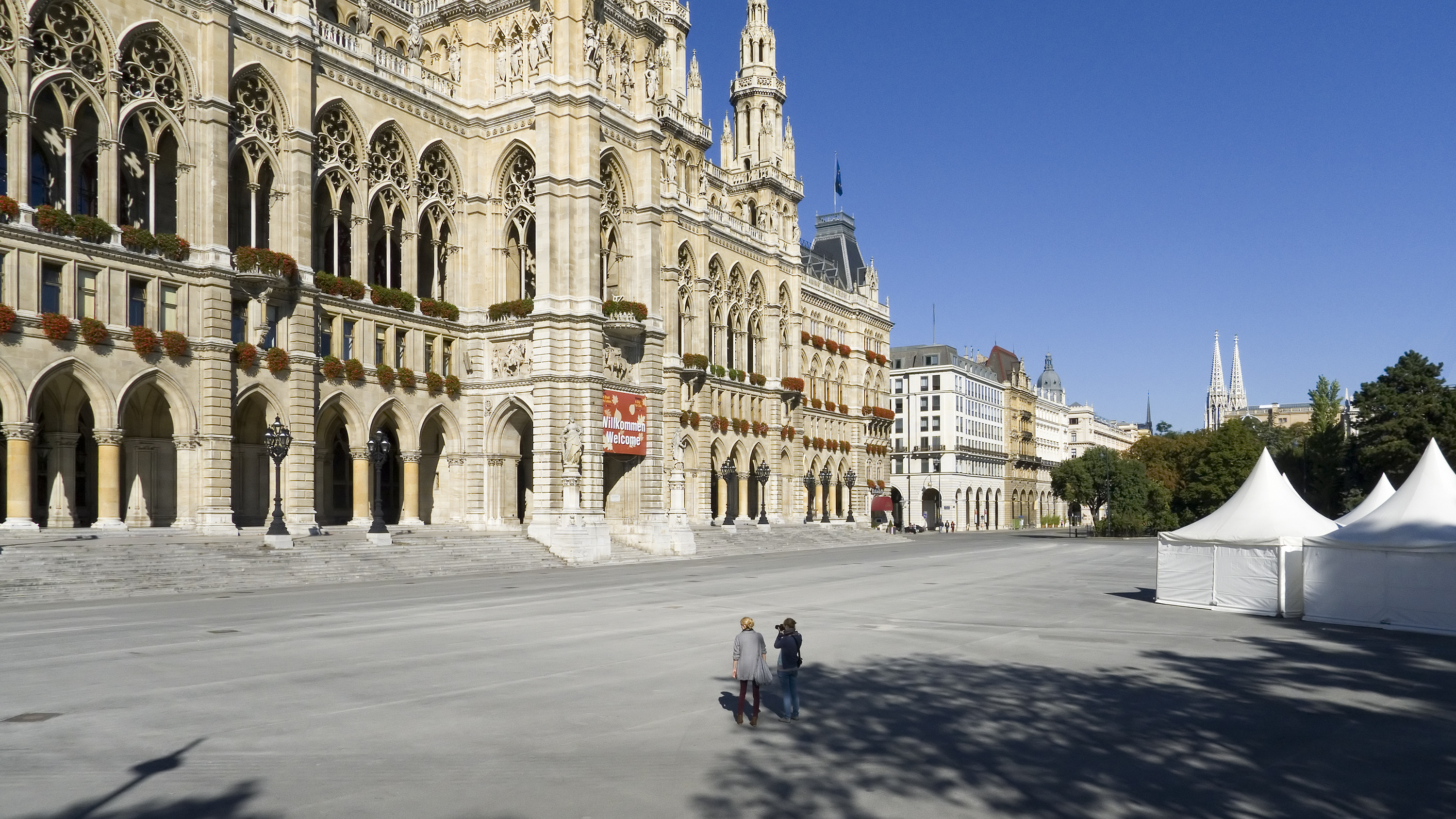
Rathausplatz, Vienna was the host location of the Eurovision Young Musicians 2006 final.

Rathausplatz, a square outside the Wiener Rathaus city hall of Vienna, was the host location for the 2006 edition of Eurovision Young Musicians final. Schubert Hall in the Konzerthaus, a concert hall in Vienna, Austria, hosted the semi-final round. The Great Hall of Konzerthaus previously hosted the contest in 1998.

== Format ==
Actor Michael Ostrowski in his role as Schallbert "Sillety" Gilet was the host of the 2006 contest. The interval act included performances of several Mozart pieces by the host, and other invited artists.

== Participants and results ==
=== Semi-final ===
Broadcasters from eighteen countries took part in the semi-final round of the 2006 contest, of which seven qualified to the televised grand final.

==== Part 1 (7 May) ====
R/O	Country	Broadcaster	Performer	Instrument	Piece(s)	R.
2	Belgium	RTBF	Ilia Laporev	Cello	1) Sonata in G major, 1st mvt. (allegro brillante) (J. B. Breval); 2) Variations on one string on a theme of Rossini (N. Paganini)	—N/a
5	Bulgaria	BNT	Ivan Szvetozarevo Gerasimov	Bassoon	1) Concerto in B flat major, 1st mvt. (W. A. Mozart); 2) Recitativ, Siciliana and Rondo (E. Bozza)	—N/a
1	Cyprus	CyBC	Jórgosz Mánnurisz	Piano	1) Sonata in D minor "Toccata" K 141 (D. Scarlatti); 2) Rondo in D major KV485 (W. A. Mozart); 3) Scherzo in F sharp minor (F. Mendelssohn)	—N/a
7	Greece	ERT	Jónian-Ilia Kadesa	Violin	1) Concert in G major No. 3 KV 216, 1st mvt. (W. A. Mozart); 2) Concert in G major No. 3 KV 216, 2nd mvt (W. A. Mozart)	—N/a
8	Croatia	HRT	Varga Zita	Cello	1) Isonata A major, 1st mvt. (L. Boccherini); 2) Sonata in G major 1st mvt. (for Violin), KV 301 (W. A. Mozart); 3) Chant de Menestrel, Op. 71 (A, Glazunov); 4) Dance du Diable Vert (G. Cassado)	—N/a
4	Norway	NRK	Tine Thing Helseth	Trumpet	1) Solus, 3rd mvt. (S. Friedman); 2) Legend (G. Enescu); 3) Concerto in E flat major, 2nd mvt (J. B. G. Neruda)	Q
9	Romania	TVR	Alina Elena Bercu	Piano	1) Fantasie in C major Hob. XVII:4 (1789) (J. Haydn); 2) La valse (1914) (M. Ravel)	Q
3	Serbia and Montenegro	UJRT	Marija Gođevac	Piano	1) Toccata BWV 914 in E minor (J. S. Bach); 2) Rondo Sonata in C minor, 4th mvt. (C. M. Weber)	—N/a
10	United Kingdom	BBC	Jennifer Pike	Violin	1) Sonata in G major KV301, 1st mvt. (W. A. Mozart); 2) Sonata in G minor, 1st mvt. (C. Debussy); 3) Tambourin Chinois (F. Kreisler); 4) Etude Op. 25, No. 12 (F. Chopin)	Q
6	Switzerland	SRG SSR	Simone Sommerhalder	Oboe	1) Capriccio for oboe and piano (A. Ponchielli); 2) Concerto for oboe in C major, KV 314 (W. A. Mozart)	Q

==== Part 2 (8 May) ====
R/O	Country	Broadcaster	Performer	Instrument	Piece(s)	R.
18	Finland	Yle	Visa Sippola	Piano	1) Grande Sonate patMtique Op. 13, I grave (L. V. Beethoven); 2) Etude Op. 72, No. 6 (M. Mozskovsky); 3) Etude Op. 25, No. 12 (F. Chopin)	—N/a
12	Netherlands	NPS	Kate Sebring	Piano	1) Etude Op. 2 No. I in C sharp minor (A. Scriabin); 2) Tarantella (F. Liszt)	—N/a
13	Austria	ORF	Daniela Koch	Flute	1) Concerto No. 2 in D minor, KV 314, 2nd mvt. (W. A. Mozart); 2) Concerto No 2 in D minor, KV 314, 3rd mvt (W. A. Mozart); 3) Fantaisie sur "Le Freyschutz" (C. P. Taffanel)	Q
17	Poland	TVP	Jacek Kortus	Piano	1) Tarantella (F. Liszt); 2) Etude Op. 25, No. 1l in A minor (F. Chopin)	—N/a
14	Russia	RTR	Dmitri Majboroda	Piano	1) Fantasia on a theme of "Largo al factotum" from G. Rossini: "Il Barbiere di Siviglia" (G. Ginzburg); 2) Sonate No. 1l A major KV331 "Rondo alla Torea" (W. A. Mozart); 3) Concerto suite from the ballet "The Nutcracker": March, Andante mozetor (P. I. Tchaikovsky; M. Pletnev)	Q
16	Slovenia	RTVSLO	Luka Šulić	Cello	1) Sonata for Cello Solo (3rd mvt., Toceata) (G. Crumb); 2) Seven Variations (Thema, I, II, IV, VII) (L. V. Beethoven); 3) Pezzo capriccioso, Op. 62 (P. I. Tchaikovsky)	—N/a
11	Czech Republic	ČT	Markéta Janoušková	Violin	1) Romana Andaluzo, Op. 22, Nr. 1 (P. de Sarasate); 2) Danza espagnolo, arr. Fritz Kreisler (M. de Falla); 3) Appasionato (Four Pieces for Violin and Piano), Op. 17 (J. Suk); 4) Scherzo ("Spring" Sonata) (L. V. Beethoven)	—N/a
15	Sweden	SVT	Andreas Brantelid	Cello	1) Sonata "Arpeggione", Ist mvt. (F. Schubert); 2) from "Carmen fantasie" (own arrangement) (P. d. Sarasate)	Q

=== Final ===
Due to the celebrations of the 250th anniversary of the birth of Wolfgang Amadeus Mozart, the pieces performed by the finalists were restricted to Mozart or pieces from his contemporaries. Awards were given to the top three countries. The table below highlights these using gold, silver, and bronze. The placing results of the remaining participants is unknown and never made public by the European Broadcasting Union.

R/O	Country	Performer	Instrument	Piece	Composer	Result
1	Romania	Alina Elena Bercu	Piano	Piano Concerto, KV 503, 1st mov.	W.A. Mozart	
2	Switzerland	Simone Sommerhalder	Oboe	Oboe Concerto, KV 314, 1st mov.	W.A. Mozart	
3	United Kingdom	Jennifer Pike	Violin	Violin Concerto, KV 216, 2nd mov.	W.A. Mozart	
4	Norway	Tine Thing Helseth	Trumpet	Trumpet Concerto, 1st mov.	Joseph Haydn	2
5	Sweden	Andreas Brantelid	Cello	Violoncello Concerto, 1st mov.	Joseph Haydn	1
6	Austria	Daniela Koch	Flute	Flute Concerto, KV 314, 1st mov.	W.A. Mozart	
7	Russia	Dmitry Mayboroda	Piano	Piano Concerto, KV 467, 3rd mov.	W.A. Mozart	3

== Jury members ==
The jury members consisted of the following:

- Austria – Ranko Markovic (head)
- Japan/Switzerland – Hiroko Sakagami
- Sweden – Martin Fröst
- United States – Carole Dawn Reinhart
- Austria – Heinz Sichrovsky
- Norway – Erik Niord Larsen
- Austria – Lidia Baich

== Broadcasting ==
The participating broadcasters received the competition live via the Eurovision Network and broadcast it in their territories. Known details on the broadcasts in each country, including the specific broadcasting stations and commentators are shown in the tables below.

Broadcasters in participating countries
Country	Broadcaster(s)	Channel(s)	Commentator(s)	Ref(s)
Austria	ORF	ORF 2		
Belgium	RTBF	La Deux		
Belgium	VRT			
Bulgaria	BNT			
Croatia	HRT			
Cyprus	CyBC			
Czech Republic	ČT			
Finland	Yle	Yle Teema		
Greece	ERT			
Netherlands	NPS			
Norway	NRK	NRK1		
Poland	TVP			
Romania	TVR	TVR Cultural		
Russia	RTR	KTVC		
Serbia and Montenegro	RTS	RTS 2		
Slovenia	RTVSLO			
Sweden	SVT	SVT2	Marianne Söderberg	
Switzerland	SF	SF 1 (Note: Deferred broadcast on 14 May at 23:10)		
Switzerland	TSR			
Switzerland	TSI			
United Kingdom	BBC	BBC Four (Note: Deferred broadcast, in a shortened format, on 31 May at 20:00)	Howard Goodall	

Broadcasters in non-participating countries
Country	Broadcaster(s)	Channel(s)	Commentator(s)	Ref.
Germany	3sat			

== See also ==
- Eurovision Song Contest 2006
- Junior Eurovision Song Contest 2006
