= Eurovision Young Musicians 1992 =

International youth classical music contest

Dates and venue
- Semi-final 1: 3 June 1992
- Semi-final 2: 4 June 1992
- Final: 9 June 1992
- Venue: Cirque Royal; Brussels, Belgium

Organisation
- Organiser: European Broadcasting Union (EBU)
- Executive supervisor: Frank Naef

Production
- Host broadcaster: Radio Télévision Belge Francophone (RTBF)
- Director: Jacques Bourton
- Musical director: Ronald Zollman
- Presenter: Marie-Françoise Renson

Participants
- Number of entries: 18
- Number of finalists: 8
- Debuting countries: Hungary; Poland
- Non-returning countries: Greece; Italy
- Participation map: Finalist countries Countries eliminated in the preliminary round Countries that participated in the past but not in 1992

Vote
- Voting system: Jury chose their top 3 favourites by vote.
- Winning musician: Poland; Bartłomiej Nizioł

Eurovision Young Musicians 1992 was the 6th edition of Eurovision Young Musicians. It consisted of two semi-finals on 3 and 4 June and a final on 9 June 1992, held at Cirque Royal in Brussels, Belgium, and presented by Marie-Françoise Renson. It was organised by the European Broadcasting Union (EBU) and host broadcaster Radio Télévision Belge Francophone (RTBF). The Belgian National Orchestra conducted by Ronald Zollman accompanied all competing performers.

Musicians representing eighteen countries took part in the competition, with eight of them participating in the televised final. Hungary and Poland made their début (their first participations in any Eurovision event, with both débuting at the flagship Eurovision Song Contest in 1994), while Greece and Italy decided not to participate.

The winner was violinist Bartłomiej Nizioł representing Poland, with harmonicist Antonio Serrano representing Spain placing second, and cellist Marie Hallynck representing Belgium placing third. It marked the first time any country had won on its first participation in any Eurovision. Technically, it would also mark the only time a broadcaster won a Eurovision event without being a full member of the EBU, as Telewizja Polska (TVP) wouldn't formally join the EBU until the following year.

The contest also marked the last participation of Yugoslavia in the contest. By the time of the contest, United Nations Security Council Resolution 757 (adopted 30 May 1992) had already placed sanctions on FR Yugoslavia, which included a ban on its participation in international contests and cultural events. Therefore, this was the last participation of Yugoslavia at any Eurovision event.

== Location ==
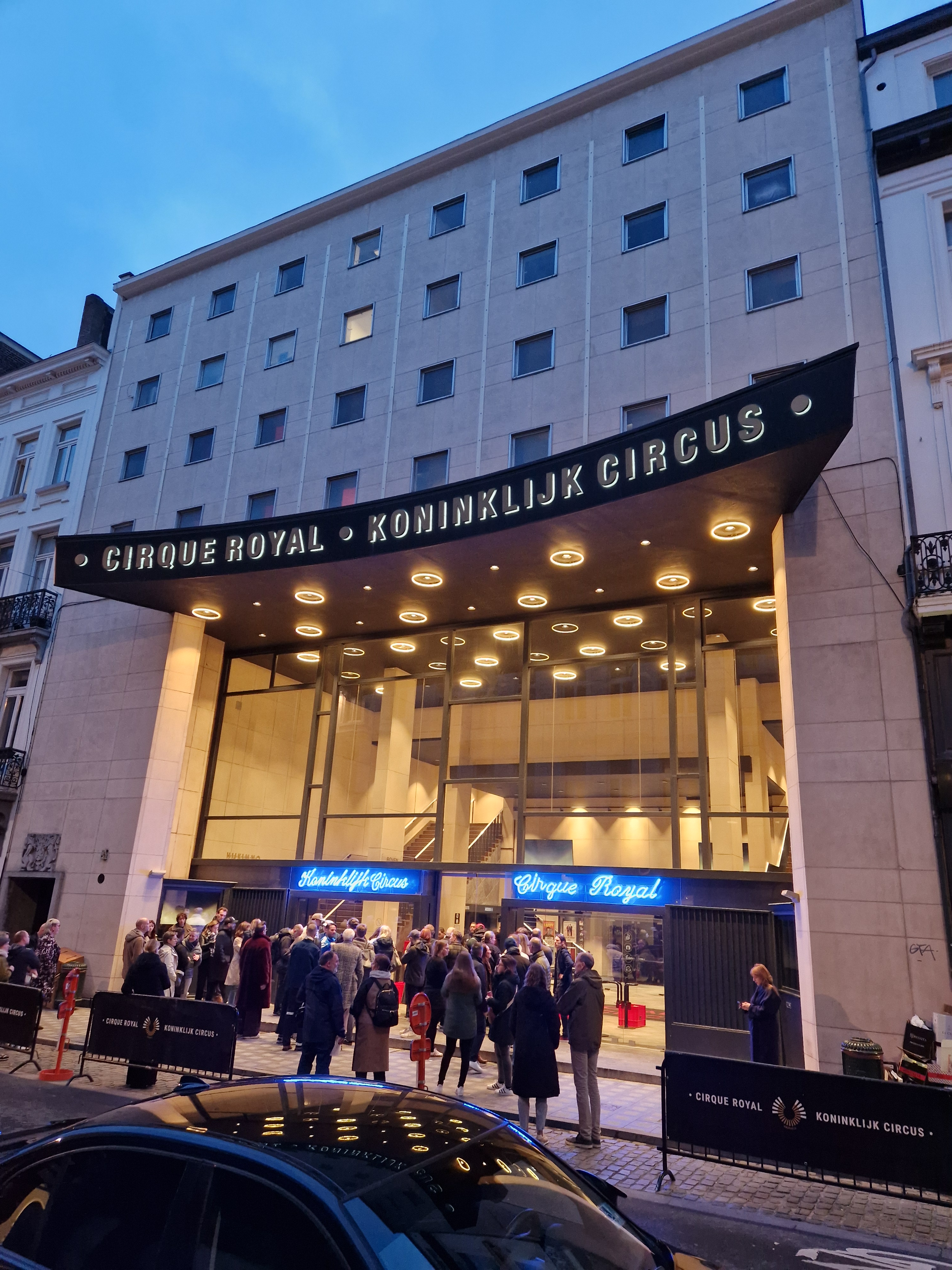
Cirque Royal, Brussels. Venue of Eurovision Young Musicians 1992.

Cirque Royale (French) or Koninklijk Circus (Dutch) an entertainment venue in Brussels, Belgium, was the host venue for the 1992 edition of Eurovision Young Musicians. Conceived by architect Wilhelm Kuhnen, the building has a circular appearance but in fact is constructed as a regular polygon. It can hold 3,500 spectators, and nowadays is primarily used for live music shows.

== Format ==
Belgian radio and television presenter and actress Marie-Françoise Renson, also known by her pseudonym "Soda", was the host of the 1992 contest. "Soda" was later the Belgian spokesperson at the Eurovision Song Contest in 1995. Stéphane Grappelli, Marc Fosset and Jean-Philippe Viret performed during the interval. The contest was attended by Princess Paola and ended with short montage as a tribute to Frank Naef.

== Participants and results ==
=== Preliminary round ===
Broadcasters from eighteen countries took part in the preliminary round of the 1992 contest, of which eight qualified to the televised grand final. The official list of performers in the preliminary round is unknown. The following countries failed to qualify.

Country	Broadcaster	Performer	Instrument
Cyprus	CyBC	Manolis Neophytou	Piano
France	FR3	Vanessa Wagner	Piano
Germany	ZDF	Florence Sitruk	Harp
Hungary	MTV	Édua Zádory	Violin
Ireland	RTÉ	Jennifer Sturgeon	Flute
Netherlands	NOS	Unknown	
Portugal	RTP	Unknown	
Sweden	SVT	Unknown	
Switzerland	SRG SSR	Ariane Häring	Piano
Yugoslavia	JRT	Ognjen Popović	Clarinet

=== Final ===
Awards were given to the top three participants. The table below highlights these using gold, silver, and bronze. The placing results of the remaining participants is unknown and never made public by the European Broadcasting Union.

Participants and results
R/O	Country	Broadcaster	Performer(s)	Instrument	Piece(s)	Composer(s)	Pl.
1	Denmark	DR	Marie Rørbech	Piano	Piano Concerto No. 3	Béla Bartók	
2	United Kingdom	BBC	Frederick Kempf	Piano	Rhapsody on a Theme of Paganini, Op. 43	Sergei Rachmaninoff	
3	Finland	Yle	Helen Lindén	Cello	Cello Concerto in E Minor, Op. 85	Edward Elgar	
4	Poland	TVP	Bartłomiej Nizioł	Violin	Violin Concerto in D Major, Op. 77	Johannes Brahms	1
5	Belgium	RTBF	Marie Hallynck	Cello	Cello Concerto No. 1, Allegretto	Dmitri Shostakovich	3
6	Norway	NRK	Henning Kraggerud	Violin	Violin Concerto in D Major, Op. 35	Pyotr Ilyich Tchaikovsky	
7	Austria	ORF	Andreas Schablas	Clarinet	Clarinet Concerto in A Major, Kv 622	Wolfgang Amadeus Mozart	
8	Spain	TVE	Antonio Serrano	Harmonica	Harmonica Concerto, Op. 46	Malcolm Arnold	2

== Jury members ==
The known members of the jury were Aldo Ciccolini, Arnold Baren, Carole Dawn Reinhart, Clemens Quatacker, Noël Lee, Frédéric Lodéon, Ursula Gorniak, Walter Boeykens and Carlos Païta who was the chairman.

== Broadcasts ==
EBU members from the following countries broadcast the final round. Known details on the broadcasts in each country, including the specific broadcasting stations and commentators are shown in the tables below.

Broadcasters in participating countries
Country	Broadcaster	Channel(s)	Commentator(s)	Ref(s)
Austria	ORF	FS2 (Note: Deferred broadcast at 22:30 (CET))		
Belgium	RTBF	RTBF1, (Note: Re-broadcast aired on Télé 21 at 20:30 (CET)) Radio 3		
Cyprus	CyBC	RIK 2		
Denmark	DR	DR TV (Note: Delayed broadcast on 14 June at 21:06 (CET))	Niels Oxenvad	
Finland	YLE	TV1		
France	FR3 (Note: Deferred broadcast at 23:00 (CET))		Alain Duault	
France	TV5 Europe (Note: Delayed broadcast on 21 June at 10:15 (CET))			
France	Arte (Note: Delayed broadcast on 10 June at 21:20 (CET))			
Germany	ZDF (Note: Deferred broadcast at 23:00 (CET))			
Hungary	MTV	MTV2 (Note: Delayed broadcast on 29 June at 23:20 (CET))		
Ireland	RTÉ	Network 2		
Norway	NRK	NRK Fjernsynet (Note: Delayed broadcast on 12 August at 21:00 (CET))		
Poland	TVP	TVP2		
Sweden	SVT	TV2 (Note: Delayed broadcast on 20 September at 16:00 CET (15:00 UTC); this was preceded by two summary reports, on the Swedish selection and semi-finals, broadcast on 13 September)	Marianne Söderberg	
Switzerland	SRG SSR	SRG Sportkette	Verena Hoehne	
Switzerland	SRG SSR	SSR Chaîne Sportive, Espace 2		
Switzerland	SRG SSR	SSR Canale Sportivo		
United Kingdom	BBC	BBC2 (Note: Delayed broadcast on 13 June at 15:00 UTC)	Humphrey Burton	
Yugoslavia	JRT	RTS B2		

Broadcasters and commentators in non-participating countries
Country	Broadcaster	Channel(s)	Commentator(s)	Ref.
Canada	TV5	TV5 Québec Canada (Note: Delayed broadcast on 21 June at 22:00 (EDT))		
Croatia	HRT	HTV 2 (Note: Delayed broadcast on 7 July at 23:20 (CEST))		
Czechoslovakia	ČST	F1 (Note: Delayed broadcast on 13 June at 15:55 (CEST))		

== Official album ==
6th Eurovision Competition For Young Musicians

Compilation album by Eurovision Young Musicians
- Released: 1992
- Recorded: 8–9 June 1992
- Venues: Cirque Royal, Brussels
- Genre: Classical
- Length: 1:09:04
- Label: Pavane

6th Eurovision Competition For Young Musicians was the official compilation album of the 1992 Contest, put together by the European Broadcasting Union and released by Pavane Records after the contest in June 1992.

== See also ==
- Eurovision Song Contest 1992
