= Julian Rachlin =

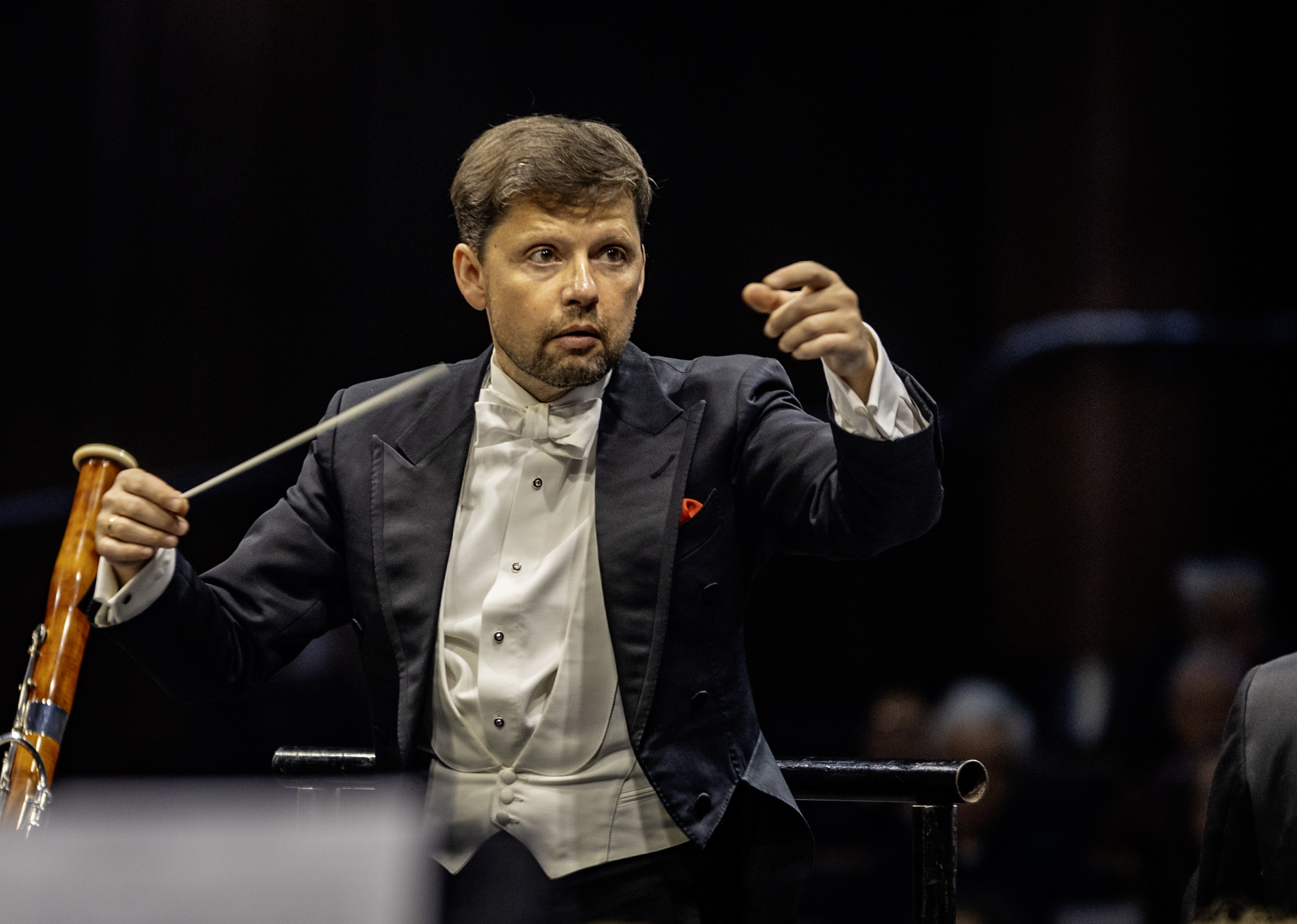
- Julian Rachlin, 2024

Background information
- Born: 8 December 1974 (age 51); Vilnius, Lithuanian SSR, USSR
- Genres: Classical
- Occupations: Performer, conductor
- Instrument: Violin
- Years active: 1988–present
- Website: www.julianrachlin.com

Julian Mikhaylovich Rachlin (Russian: Юлиан Михайлович Рахлин, Lithuanian: Julianas Rachlinas; born 8 December 1974) is a Lithuanian violinist, violist, and conductor.

== Biography ==
Born in Vilnius to a Jewish family, he emigrated in 1978 with his musician parents to Austria. In 1983, he entered the Konservatorium Wien and studied violin in the Soviet tradition with Boris Kuschnir, while also receiving private lessons from Pinchas Zukerman. His career as a child prodigy began with his first public concert in 1984.

In 1988, he took the title of Eurovision Young Musician of the Year, which led to his being invited to appear at the Berlin Festival with Lorin Maazel and to his becoming the youngest soloist to ever play with the Vienna Philharmonic, under the direction of Riccardo Muti.

In 2000, he joined Rostropovich and Yuri Bashmet, among others, in the premiere of Krzysztof Penderecki's Sextet. The same year, Rachlin also founded his own music festival in Dubrovnik, "Julian Rachlin and Friends". Since 2000, he has also played the concerto and chamber repertoire for the viola.

In 2005, Rachlin made his Carnegie Hall debut when he performed with the New York Philharmonic and Lorin Maazel.

Beside Lorin Maazel and Riccardo Muti, Julian Rachlin has worked also with conductors like Mariss Jansons, Zubin Mehta, Daniele Gatti, Klaus Mäkelä, Gianandrea Noseda, Santtu-Matias Rouvali, Vladimir Ashkenazy, Herbert Blomstedt, Myung-whun Chung, Nayden Todorov, Bernard Haitink, Esa-Pekka Salonen and Wolfgang Sawallisch.

In recent years Julian Rachlin is also active as a conductor. In 2014, he was appointed principal guest conductor of the Royal Northern Sinfonia. In 2018, he became principal guest conductor of the Kristiansand Symphony Orchestra. In November 2022, the KSO announced the appointment of Rachlin as its next chief conductor, effective with the 2023-2024 season. In January 2023, the Jerusalem Symphony Orchestra announced the appointment of Rachlin as its next music director, effective with the 2023–2024 season, until 2026.

Rachlin plays the "ex Liebig" Stradivarius violin, crafted in 1704, and a Lorenzo Storioni viola crafted in 1785, the former of which is loaned to him by its owner, the Dkfm. Angelika Prokopp Privatstiftung (lit. 'Dkfm. Angelika Prokopp Private Foundation').

In 2000, he was awarded the International Prize of the Accademia Musicale Chigiana of Siena.

Cultural offices
Preceded by Nathalie Stutzmann	Chief Conductor, Kristiansand Symphony Orchestra; 2023–present	Succeeded by incumbent
Preceded by Steven Sloane	Music Director, Jerusalem Symphony Orchestra; 2023–present	Succeeded by incumbent
