= Andreas Brantelid =

Swedish-Danish cellist

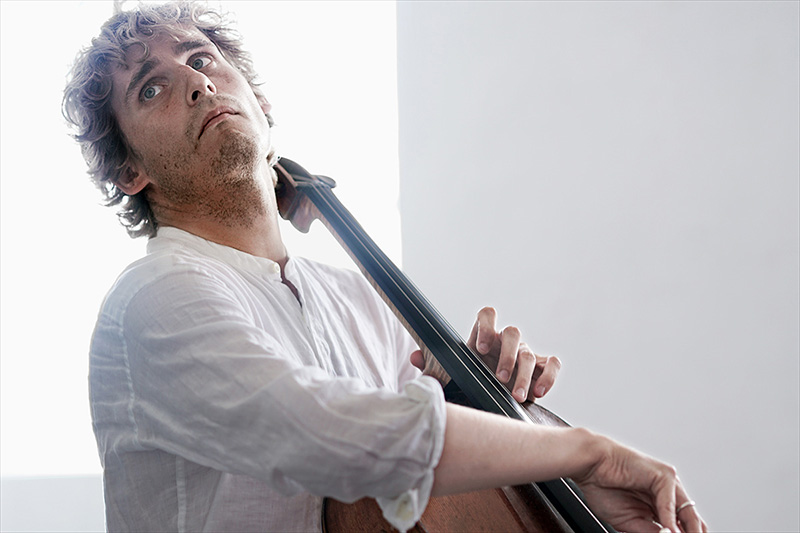
- Andreas Brantelid (2018)
- Born: 8 October 1987 (age 38)
- Occupation: Cellist

Andreas Brantelid (born 8 October 1987) is a Swedish-Danish cellist.

He had his concerto debut at the age of 14 playing Elgar's Cello Concerto with the Royal Danish Orchestra. In 2006 he won the Eurovision Young Musicians contest, representing Sweden, and the following year he was named DR Kunstner 2007 (Artist of the Year). In 2009, Brantelid received the Danish Crown Prince Couple's Culture Prize. Andreas Brantelid has been a “Junge Wilde“ artist at the Konzerthaus Dortmund from 2012 until 2015.
