= André Waignein =

Belgian composer, conductor, trumpeter, and musicologist

- Born: 28 January 1942; Belgium
- Died: 22 November 2015 (aged 73)
- Occupations: Composer, musician, Professor

André Waignein (28 January 1942 – 22 November 2015) was a Belgian composer, conductor, trumpeter, and musicologist. He is well known for his symphonies with over six hundred compositions at the time of his death. Waignein's symphonies were known to be lively and upbeat, and they reflected his character. He was a professor at the Conservatoire Royal de Bruxelles and a director at the Conservatoire de Tournai

He wrote under the pseudonyms of Rita Defoort (the name of his wife), Rob Ares, Luc Gistel, Roland Kernen, and Larry Foster.
