= Florence Sitruk =

French-German harpist

Florence Sitruk (born 7 June 1974, Heidelberg) is a harpist, professor of harp and music teacher of French and German ancestry.

== Life ==
She took her first harp lesson at age six at the Winterthur Conservatory (today Zurich University of the Arts) and gave her first music performance two years later. At the age of twelve, she went on to study harp at the University of Music Stuttgart. She continued her studies at age seventeen at the Strasbourg Conservatory and then went to the world-famous harp school, the Conservatoire Supérieur de Paris. Meanwhile, she got degrees in musicology and philosophy at the University of Freiburg. In those years, she also studied early music with Robert Hill, harpsichordist. She was very impressed by him and by Marielle Nordmann Parisian harpist and harp teacher. She gained her artist diploma from Indiana University Bloomington/Jacobs School of Music, where here most influential teachers were Susann McDonald harpist and György Sebők the legendary late pianist. Sebők predicted she would become “one of the finest artists in her field”. Besides Sebők she has worked in masterclasses with György Kurtág and Ferenc Rados, who have both had a decisive influence on her development.

Sitruk Was 26 when she was appointed guest professor at the Lithuanian Music Academy in Vilnius. She has begun teaching at the Geneva University of Music in 2005 as the youngest professor then in her field. In 2008, she was appointed adjunct professor at Tokyo Tech University in Japan. Since 2014 she has been teaching as a guest professor at the Academy of Music in Kraków, Poland, replacing Isabelle Perrin. In 2008 she was of the Elias Parish Alvars Harp Festival in Teignmouth. Since 2010, she is the artistic director of the Swiss chamber music festival “Les muséiques”. She holds the same position at the International Harp Contest in Israel since 2013. In 2016, she became a jury member of the USA International Harp Competition.

She often gives solo and chamber music performances and plays with leading orchestras. She gave her first major concert at age 15 with the Camerata Academica Salzburg conducted by Sándor Végh. Since her debut, she concertizes regularly as a soloist with orchestras such as the Lucerne Festival Strings, the Stuttgart Chamber Orchestra, the Dresden Philharmonic, the Freiburg Baroque Soloists, the Lithuanian National Philharmonic, the St. Christopher Chamber Orchestra, the Deutsche Kammerakademie Neuss, the Deutsches Symphonie-Orchester Berlin and Berlin Philharmonic. She’s been touring all over the world, visited several countries and places such as Estonia, Tasmania, Morocco, St. Petersburg, Australia and Asia. At world premieres, she played Ami Maayani, György Kurtág, Ferenc Farkas, Robert HP Platz and other composers’ showpieces. As a chamber musician, she enjoys playing together with the Čiurlionis String Quartet in Vilnius, Rachel Harnisch, soprano, Stella Dufexis, mezzo-soprano or Gergely Bodoky, flute.

In 2012, she held a successful Masterclass in Hungary, followed by a concert titled “Hommage à György Sebők: the 90th anniversary of the world-famous pianist and pedagogue”. She performed again in Hungary in 2013.

She is a mother of three children, a little girl and a set of twin boys. Her family lived in Berlin, today she is professor in Bloomington at Jacobs School of Music.
