= Eurovision Young Musicians 1986 =

International youth classical music contest

Dates and venue
- Semi-final 1: 22 May 1986
- Semi-final 2: 23 May 1986
- Final: 27 May 1986
- Venue: Koncerthuset; Copenhagen, Denmark

Organisation
- Organiser: European Broadcasting Union (EBU)
- Executive supervisor: Frank Naef

Production
- Host broadcaster: Danmarks Radio (DR)
- Director: Marianne Montell
- Executive producer: Niels Karl Nielsen
- Musical director: Hans Graf
- Presenter: Anette Faaborg

Participants
- Number of entries: 15
- Number of finalists: 5
- Debuting countries: Belgium; Denmark (Note: Denmark and Sweden made their first appearance on stage this year, having been jointly represented by Norway in 1982 and by Finland in 1984.); Ireland; Israel; Italy; Sweden; Yugoslavia
- Returning countries: Norway (Note: Norway reappeared on stage after being represented by Finland in 1984.)
- Participation map: Finalist countries Did not qualify from the preliminary round

Vote
- Voting system: Jury chose their top 3 favourites by vote.
- Winning musician: France; Sandrine Lazarides

Eurovision Young Musicians 1986 was the 3rd edition of Eurovision Young Musicians. It consisted of two semi-finals on 22 and 23 May and a final on 27 May 1986, held at the Koncerthuset, in Copenhagen, Denmark, and presented by Anette Faaborg. It was organised by the European Broadcasting Union (EBU) and host broadcaster Danmarks Radio (DR). The Danish Radio Symphony Orchestra conducted by Hans Graf accompanied all competing performers.

Musicians representing fifteen countries took part in the competition, with five of them participating in the televised final. The participant artists could not be older than 19 by the time of the contest. Belgium, Ireland, Israel, Italy, and Yugoslavia made their début. Denmark and Sweden also made their first appearance on stage this year, having been jointly represented by Norway in 1982 and by Finland in 1984.

The winner was pianist Sandrine Lazarides representing France, with pianist Marian Rosenfeld representing Switzerland placing second, and cellist Jan-Erik Gustafsson representing Finland placing third.

== Location ==
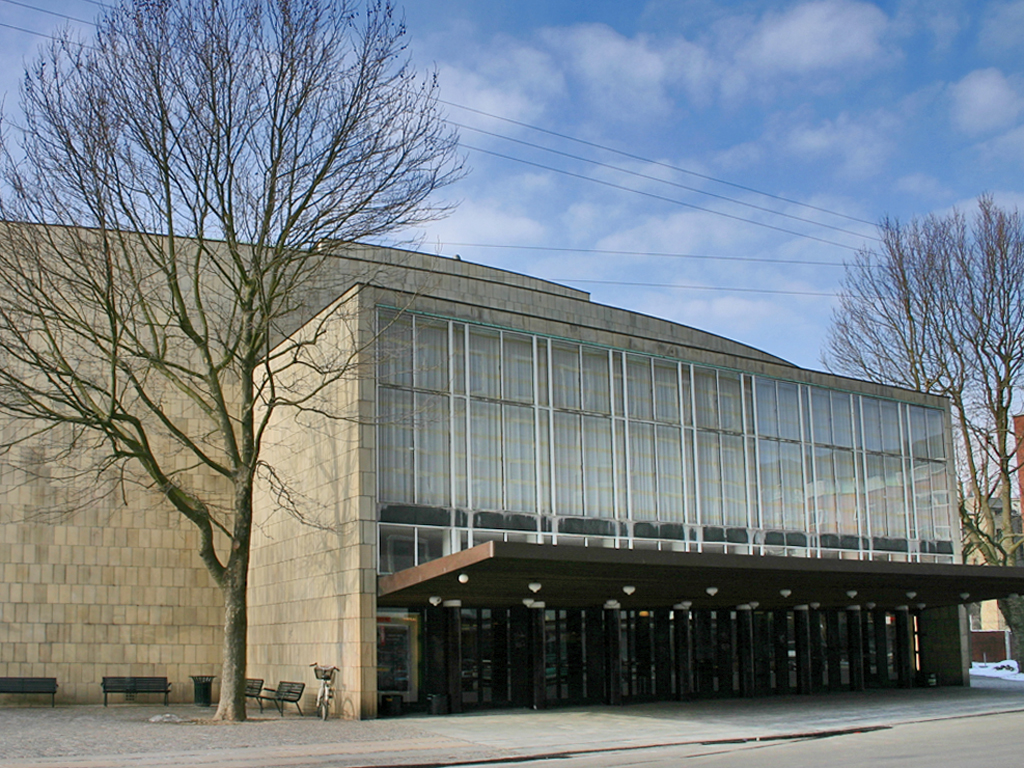
Koncerthuset, Copenhagen. Venue of Eurovision Young Musicians 1986.

The Koncerthuset at Radiohuset in Copenhagen, Denmark, was the host venue for the 1986 edition of Eurovision Young Musicians.

Radiohuset (literally "Radio House") is the former headquarters of national Danish broadcaster DR, located on Rosenørns Allé in Frederiksberg, Copenhagen. The building complex was inaugurated in 1945 to a Functionalist design by Vilhelm Lauritzen and later expanded in 1958 and 1972. Vacated by DR when DR Byen was inaugurated in 2006, the buildings now house the Royal Danish Academy of Music as well as the Museum of Music. The complex also contains a 1,200-seat concert hall, Koncerthuset.

== Format ==
The final took place on 27 May 1986, beginning at 20:30 CET (19:30 UTC).

Anette Faaborg was the host of the 1986 contest. Each participating country were able to send male or female artists who were no older than 19 years of age, to represent them by playing a classical piece of their choice, accompanied by the Danish Radio Symphony Orchestra under the leadership of Hans Graf. The winner and runner-up of the previous edition, Isabelle van Keulen and Olli Mustonen respectively, performed "Suite Italienne" during the interval.

== Participants and results ==
=== Preliminary round ===
Broadcasters from fifteen countries took part in the preliminary round of the 1986 contest, of which five qualified to the televised grand final. The following participants failed to qualify.

Country	Broadcaster	Performer	Instrument	Piece	Composer
Austria	ORF	Günter Voglmayr	Flute	Flute Concerto No. 2 in D major, KV 314	Wolfgang Amadeus Mozart
Belgium	RTBF	Rhonny Ventat	Saxophone	Saxophone Concerto	Franz Constant
Denmark	DR	Janne Thomsen	Flute	Flute Concerto	Carl Nielsen
Germany	ZDF	Martin Menking	Cello	Cello Concerto in E minor, Op. 85	Edward Elgar
Ireland	RTÉ	Seamus Conroy	Violin	Violin Concerto	Pyotr Ilyich Tchaikovsky
Israel	IBA	Shira Ravin	Violin	Violin Concerto in E minor, Op. 64	Felix Mendelssohn
Italy	RAI	Carlo Balzaretti	Piano	Piano Concerto in G major	Maurice Ravel
Netherlands	NOS	Pauline Oostenrijk	Oboe	Oboe Concerto in C major, KV 314	Wolfgang Amadeus Mozart
Norway	NRK	Ellen Margrete Flesjø	Cello	Cello Concerto in D minor	Édouard Lalo
Sweden	SVT	Peter Jablonski	Piano	Piano Concerto in A minor	Edvard Grieg

=== Final ===
Awards were given to the top three participants. The table below highlights these using gold, silver, and bronze. The placing results of the remaining participants is unknown and never made public by the European Broadcasting Union.

Participants and results
R/O	Country	Broadcaster	Performer(s)	Instrument	Piece(s)	Composer(s)	Pl.
1	France	FR3	Sandrine Lazarides	Piano	Piano Concerto in E flat	Franz Liszt	1
2	United Kingdom	BBC	Alan Brind	Violin	Violin Concerto in D minor, Op.47, 1st mov.	Jean Sibelius	
3	Yugoslavia	JRT	Aleksandar Madžar	Piano	Piano Concerto No. 4 in G major, Op.58, 2nd and 3rd movs.	Ludwig van Beethoven	
4	Finland	YLE	Jan-Erik Gustafsson	Cello	Variations on a Rococo Theme, Op.33	Pyotr Tchaikovsky	3
5	Switzerland	SRG SSR	Marian Rosenfeld	Piano	Piano Concerto No.1 in E minor, Op.11, 2nd and 3rd movs.	Frédéric Chopin	2

== Jury members ==
The jury members consisted of the following:

=== Preliminary round ===
- Austria – Franz Wagner
- Belgium – Fud Leclerc
- Denmark – Mogens Andersen
- Finland – Anna-Karina Bentley
- France – Serge Kaufmann
- Germany – Richard Jakoby
- Ireland – Jane Carty
- Israel – Ávi Hannáni
- Italy – Ilio Catani
- Netherlands – Ton Hartsuiker
- Netherlands – Robbert Jan de Neeve
- Norway – Jan Eriksen
- Switzerland – Michel Dami
- Sweden – Sten Andersson
- United Kingdom – John Manduall
- Yugoslavia – Seadeta Midžić

=== Final ===
- Austria/United States – Carole Dawn Reinhart
- Belgium – Georges Dumortier
- Denmark – Poul Birkelund
- Finland – Hannu-Ilari Lampila
- France – Teresa Llacuna
- Germany – Siegfried Palm
- Italy – Claudio Scimone (head juror)
- Netherlands – Ton Hartsuiker
- Sweden – Björn Liljequist
- United Kingdom – Sir David Willcocks
- Yugoslavia – Jasna Nemec Novak

== Broadcasts ==
EBU members from the following countries broadcast the final round. Known details on the broadcasts in each country, including the specific broadcasting stations and commentators are shown in the tables below.

Broadcasters in participating countries
Country	Broadcaster	Channel(s)	Commentator(s)	Ref(s)
Austria	ORF	FS1 (Note: Deferred broadcast at 22:05 (CET))		
Belgium	RTBF	Télé 2	Philippe Duposty	
Denmark	DR	DR TV, DR P2	Lenard Friedmann	
France	FR3 (Note: Delayed broadcast on 31 May at 23:15 (CET))			
Germany	ZDF		Friedrich Müller	
Ireland	RTÉ	RTÉ 2		
Italy	RAI	Rai Tre		
Netherlands	NOS	Nederland 2	Joop van Zijl	
Norway	NRK	NRK Fjernsynet	Jan Eriksen	
Sweden	SVT	TV1		
Sweden	RR	SR P2		
Switzerland	SRG SSR	TV DRS (Note: Broadcast through a second audio programme on TSR)		
Switzerland	SRG SSR	TSR, RSR 2	Georges Kleinmann	
Switzerland	SRG SSR	TSI		
United Kingdom	BBC	BBC2	Humphrey Burton and Alun Francis	
Yugoslavia	JRT	TV Beograd 2, TV Titograd 2		
Yugoslavia	JRT	TV Ljubljana 2		
Yugoslavia	JRT	TV Zagreb 2		
Yugoslavia	JRT	TV Sarajevo 2		
Yugoslavia	JRT	TV Skopje 2		

Broadcasters and commentators in non-participating countries
Country	Broadcaster	Channel(s)	Commentator(s)	Ref(s)
Australia	SBS	SBS TV (Note: Delayed broadcast on 15 December at 1:55 (AEST))		

== Other countries ==
- Portugal – Portuguese broadcaster RTP attempted to take part, but were forced to withdraw as it had been unable to provide a "qualified candidate".

== See also ==
- Eurovision Song Contest 1986
