= RTS 2 (Serbian TV channel) =

Serbian TV channel

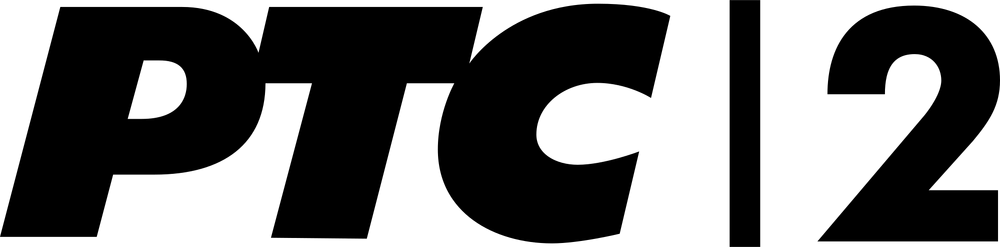
- Country: Serbia

Programming
- Picture format: 1080i (16:9) (HDTV)

Ownership
- Owner: RTS
- Sister channels: RTS 1

History
- Launched: 31 December 1971; 53 years ago
- Former names: TVB 2 (December 1971 – January 1992); RTS B2 (January 1992 – 1995)

Availability

Terrestrial
- Digital: Channel 2

RTS 2 (Serbian: РТС 2), known as RTS Program Two (Serbian: Други програм РТС-а, romanized: Drugi program RTS-a), or Drugi (Serbian: Други) is a Serbian public TV channel operated by Radio Television of Serbia (RTS). It focuses on culture, including music and sporting events. Parliamentary sittings are also broadcast live on RTS 2.

Although RTS 2 does not draw high viewership, it won the viewing day with special sporting events or special parliamentary debates. RTS 2 also broadcasts children's and educational programmes as well as re-runs of Serbian television series. Opened on 31 December 1971, it was the only Serbian television in color until the RTS 1 changed to color in mid 1970s.
