= Ziyu He =

Chinese violinist (born 1999)

Ziyu He 何子毓
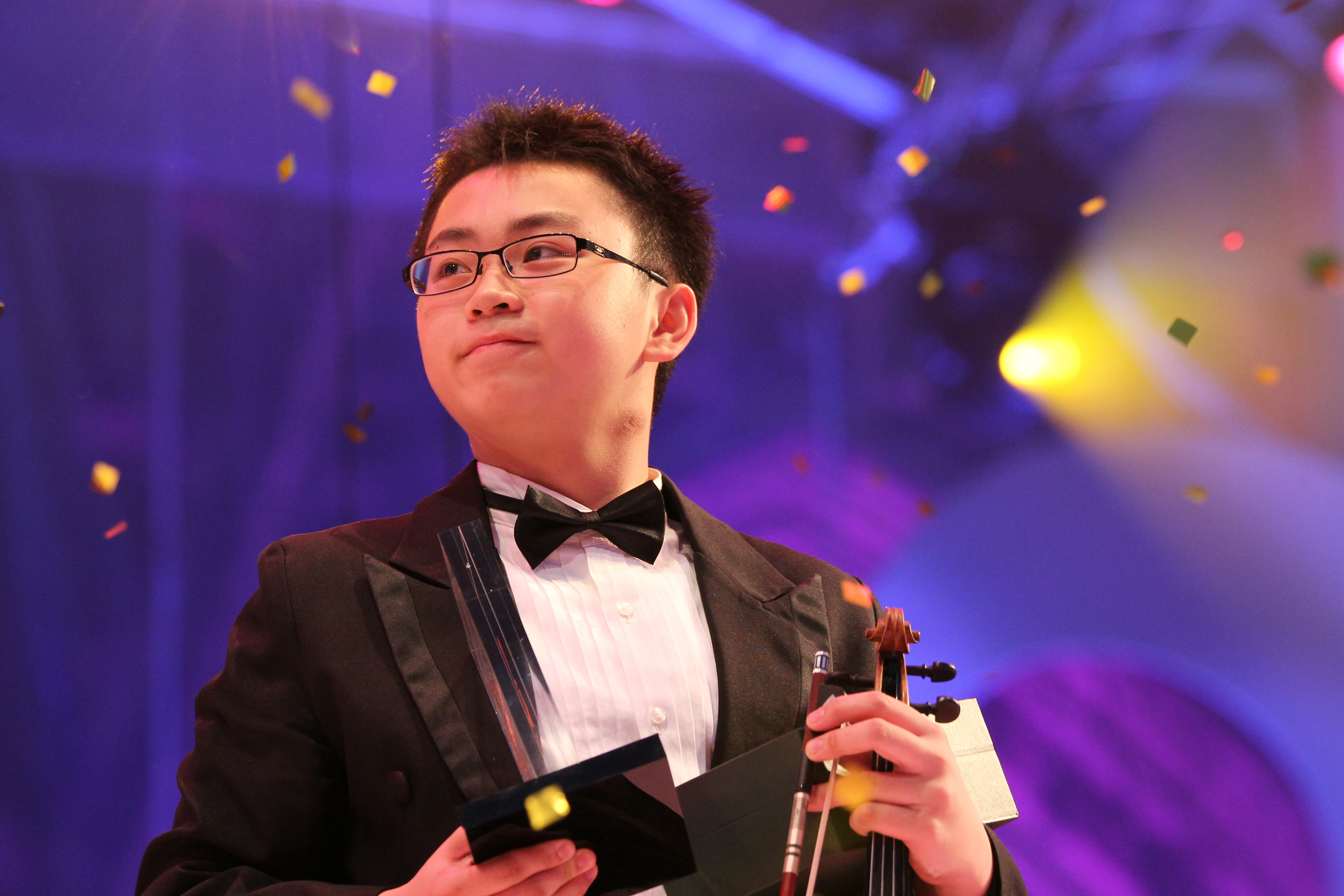

Background information
- Born: April 24, 1999 (age 27); Qingdao, China
- Occupation: Musician
- Instruments: Violin; viola
- Years active: 2004–present
- Website: www.ziyuviolin.com

Ziyu He (Chinese: 何子毓; born 24 April 1999) is a Chinese violinist. In 2011, he moved to Salzburg, Austria. At the age of 15, he won the 2014 Eurovision Young Musicians. He also won the Menuhin Competition in 2016.

== Early life ==
Ziyu He was born in 1999 in Qingdao and began playing the violin at the age of 5. His first violin teacher was Professor Xiangrong Zhang. In 2010 he was introduced in Beijing to Professor Paul Roczek from the Mozarteum University Salzburg who recognized his exceptional talent and his great instrumental and artistic potential and invited him to study with him in Salzburg and to attend the International Summer Academy. Ziyu has lived in Salzburg since 2011 and studies Violin with Professor Paul Roczek and Viola with Professor Thomas Riebl, both at the Mozarteum University. He has attended masterclasses with Ivry Gitlis, Ani Schnarch, Schmuel Ashkenasi, Vadim Gluzman, Chaim Taub, and Petru Munteanu (in Keshet Eilon, Israel and Salzburg, Austria).

== Career ==
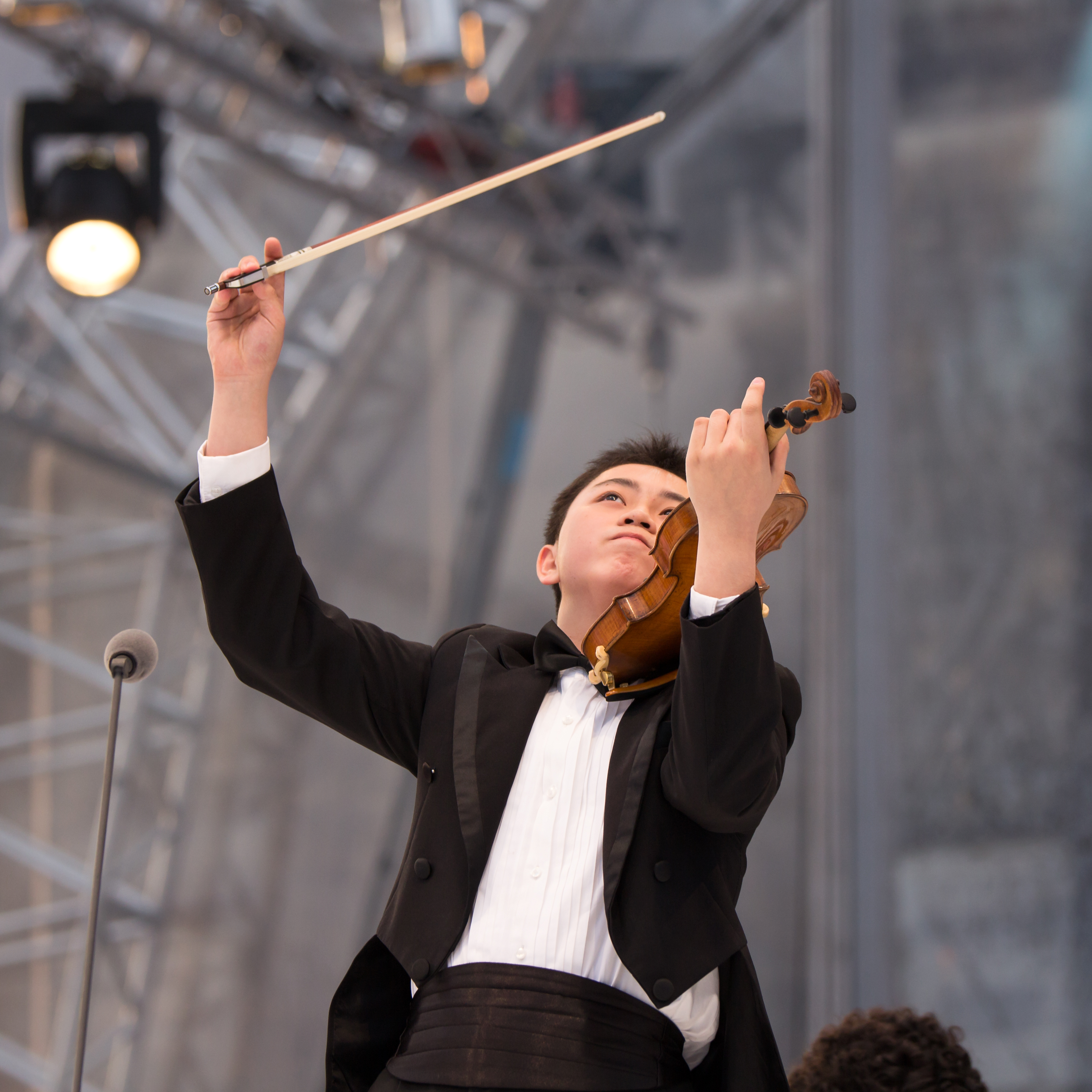
Ziyu He performing in the final of Eurovision Young Musicians 2014 in Cologne, Germany.

Ziyu was a prizewinner at the International Summer Academy of the Mozarteum University in 2011 and was invited to perform Johann Sebastian Bach's Ciaconna at the Prizewinners' Concert during the Salzburg Festival. He returned to the Festival in 2012 and 2013. In June 2012 he was the recipient of the Szymon Goldberg Award of the Music Academy in Messen as the youngest participant in all age divisions. He gave his orchestral debut in his home town of Qingdao, China, in November 2012 with the Qingdao Symphony Orchestra.

In 2013, Ziyu won a special prize as well as the third prize at the International Competition for Violin, Kloster Schöntal and a third prize at the International Louis Spohr Competition for Young Violinists. In 2014 Ziyu won first prize representing Austria at the Eurovision Young Musician's Competition in Cologne which was broadcast on TV all over Europe and in November 2014 performed Prokofiev's 2nd Violin Concerto with the Mozarteum University Symphony Orchestra conducted by Hans Graf. The following year he won first prize in his age group at the Mozart Competition in Zhuhai, China and at the International Instrumental Competition in Markneukirchen, Germany. In February 2016 he won the first prize and the prize for the best interpretation of the new commission at the International Mozart Competition in Salzburg. Only two months later he won the first prize in the Senior Division and three further prizes at the renowned Yehudi Menuhin Competition in London for his performance of "Introduction and variations in G major" for violin, Op. 38, MS 44, 1827 "Nel cor più non mi sento" by Niccolo Paganini at the 2016 Menuhin Competition. Following this victory, he made appearances on TwoSet Violin's YouTube channel as a guest violinist. Later in 2016, he won the second prize and a special prize at the International Violin Competition Leopold Mozart in Augsburg.

He has performed at the Leopold Mozart Centre at Augsburg University and at the Schumann House in Leipzig in a concert in memory of Niccolò Paganini.

Ziyu He played the "Schneiderhan" Stradivarius violin from 1715, on a one-year loan by Beare's International Violin Society.
