= Eurovision Young Musicians 2014 =

Seventeenth edition of the Eurovision Young Musicians

Dates and venues
- Prelim. round 1: 26 May 2014
- Prelim. round 2: 27 May 2014; Funkhaus Wallrafplatz Cologne, Germany
- Final: 31 May 2014; Cologne Cathedral Cologne, Germany

Organisation
- Organiser: European Broadcasting Union (EBU)
- Executive supervisor: Vladislav Yakovlev

Production
- Host broadcaster: Westdeutscher Rundfunk (WDR)
- Director: Yves Zosso
- Executive producer: Lothar Mattner
- Musical director: Kristiina Poska
- Presenter: Sabine Heinrich

Participants
- Number of entries: 14
- Debuting countries: Malta; Moldova
- Returning countries: Hungary; Portugal; Sweden
- Non-returning countries: Armenia; Belarus; Bosnia and Herzegovina; Georgia; Ukraine
- Participation map: Competing countries Countries that participated in the past but not in 2014

Vote
- Voting system: Each juror awarded a mark from 1–10 to each performer
- Winning musician: Austria; Ziyu He

Eurovision Young Musicians 2014 was the 17th edition of Eurovision Young Musicians. It consisted of a two-part preliminary round on 26 and 27 May, held at Funkhaus Wallrafplatz, and a final on 31 May 2014, held outside the Cologne Cathedral in Cologne, Germany, and presented by Sabine Heinrich. It was organised by the European Broadcasting Union (EBU) and host broadcaster Westdeutscher Rundfunk (WDR). The WDR Symphony Orchestra conducted by Kristiina Poska accompanied all competing performers. This was the fifth time that the competition was held on an open-air stage. The contest had been previously hosted in Germany in 2002.

Musicians representing fourteen countries participated in the contest, with all of them automatically qualified for the final. Malta and Moldova made their debut at Eurovision Young Musicians. Armenia, Belarus, Bosnia and Herzegovina, Georgia and Ukraine decided not to participate in this year's competition. Hungary returned for the first time since 2000. Sweden last took part in 2010, whilst Portugal had not entered since 1998. Portugal's return marked its first appearance in a televised final.

The winner was violinist Ziyu He representing Austria, with pianist Urban Stanič representing Slovenia placing second, and cellist Gergely Devich representing Hungary placing third. In 2014, Austria also won the Eurovision Song Contest.

== Location ==
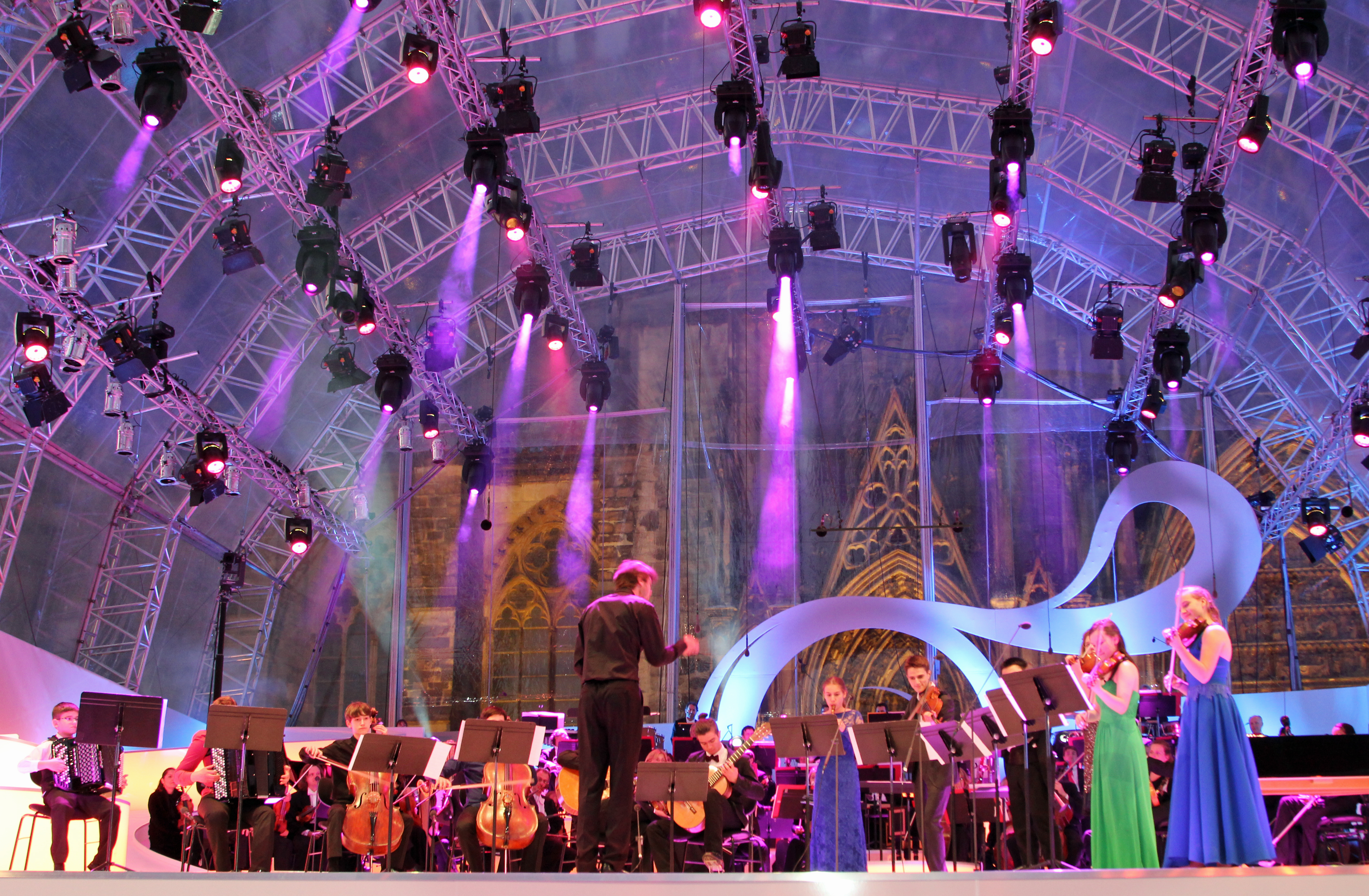
The contest was held on an open-air stage outside Cologne Cathedral, Cologne.

Roncalliplatz, a square outside the Cologne Cathedral, was the host location for the 2014 edition of Eurovision Young Musicians. The preliminary round was held at the Kleiner Sendesaal in WDR's Funkhaus Wallrafplatz.

== Format ==
Sabine Heinrich was the host of the 2014 contest. Flying Steps performed as the interval act.

The semi final stage of the contest was dropped this year, however a new preliminary round was held over two days on 26–27 May and was streamed live on youngmusicians.tv. Each musician was required to play for up to fifteen minutes in this round and a maximum of five minutes in the Grand Final on 31 May. The international jury scored each musician and performance during the preliminary round. The scores were added to those given in the Grand Final to decide the three prize winners.

The candidates were accompanied by the WDR Symphony Orchestra, under the leadership of Estonian conductor Kristiina Poska. The winner received a prize of 10,000 euros and was given the opportunity to appear with the Vienna Philharmonic Orchestra in 2015. The participants in second and third place were awarded 7,000 and 3,000 euros respectively.

== Participants and results ==
All participating countries automatically qualified for the final on 31 May 2014. The semi final elimination stage was replaced by a two-day preliminary round, that was held on 26 and 27 May respectively at the Kleiner Sendesaal in WDR's Funkhaus Wallrafplatz. The professional jury awarded points in this round.

=== Preliminary round ===
==== Part 1 (26 May 2014) ====
R/O	Country	Broadcaster	Performer	Instrument	Piece(s)
1	Croatia	HRT	Sara Domjanić	Violin	1) Sonata for Violin on C Minor, op.45, no.3 (1. mvt: Allegro molto ed appassionato) by Edvard Grieg; 2) Valse-Scherzo in C Major, op.34 by Piotr Tchaikovsky
2	Norway	NRK	Sonoko Miriam Shimano Welde	Violin	1) Poème, Op.25 by Ernest Chausson
3	Malta	PBS	Kurt Aquilina	Guitar	1) August Lullaby by Marek Mancina arranged by Per-Olov Kindgren; 2) Concerto de Aranquez by Joaquin Rodrigo; 3) Birds flew over the spire by Gary Ryan
4	Hungary	MTV	Gergely Devich	Cello	1) Minuet in C Major by Haydn-Piatti; 2) Liebestraum by Liszt-Cassado; 3) Roumanien folk dances by Bartók-Silva
5	Slovenia	RTVSLO	Urban Stanič	Piano	1) Sonata/Capriccio K20, E - Major by Domenico Scarlatti; 2) Paraphrase de concert S. 434 by Franz Liszt; 3) Suggestion diabolique, op.4 by Sergej Prokofiev
6	Austria	ORF	Ziyu He	Violin	1) Violinkonzert KV 207, 1. Satz mit Kadenz von Kurt Guntner by Wolfgang Amadeus Mozart; 2) Capriccio op. 1/1 by Niccolò Paganini; 3) 2. Violinkonzert by Belá Bartók
7	Netherlands	NTR	Lucie Horsch	Recorder	1) Sonata seconda (Renaissance sopraan) by Dario Castello; 2) Der Besucher der Idylle (1993) (tenor) by Isang Yun; 3) Adagio en Allegro uit Sonate Wq 135 by C.P.E. Bach

==== Part 2 (27 May 2014) ====
R/O	Country	Broadcaster	Performer	Instrument	Piece(s)
8	Poland	TVP	Bartosz Kołsut	Accordion	1) Praeludium and Fugue in h minor BWV 893 by Johann Sebastian Bach; 2) Near the Portrait of Niccolo Paganini by Volodymyr Runchak; 3) Don Rhapsody part III by Vjatcheslav Siemionov
9	Portugal	RTP	André Gunko	Cello	1) Suite for solo cello - Intermezzo e danza finale by Gaspar Cassadó; 2) Pezzo Capriccioso by Piotr Tchaikovsky
10	Greece	ERT	Vassilis Digos	Guitar	1) Differencias Sobre Guardame las Vacas by Luys de Narvaez; 2) Danza del Altiplano by Leo Brouwer; 3) Sonata-Joaquin Turina 2nd and 3rd movement by Joaquin Turina
11	Germany	WDR	Judith Stapf	Violin	1) Grand Caprice for violine solo op. 26 "Der Erlkönig" (according to the ballad of Franz Schubert) by Heinrich Wilhelm Ernst / Franz Schubert; 2) Estrellita by Manuel Ponce/arr. Jascha Heifetz; 3) Violin sonata in d, op. 108, 4. Presto agitato by Johannes Brahms
12	Sweden	SVT	Albin Uusijärvi	Viola	1) Romanze op 85 by Max Bruch
13	Czech Republic	ČT	Martin Kot	Accordion	1) Flick-Flack by Albert Vossen
14	Moldova	TRM	Livyka Shtirbu-Sokolov	Piano	1) Prelude and Fugue no.2 A minor op.87 by Dmitri Shostakovich; 2) Novelette No.3 by Francis Poulenc; 3) Sonata no.1 by Rodion Shchedrin

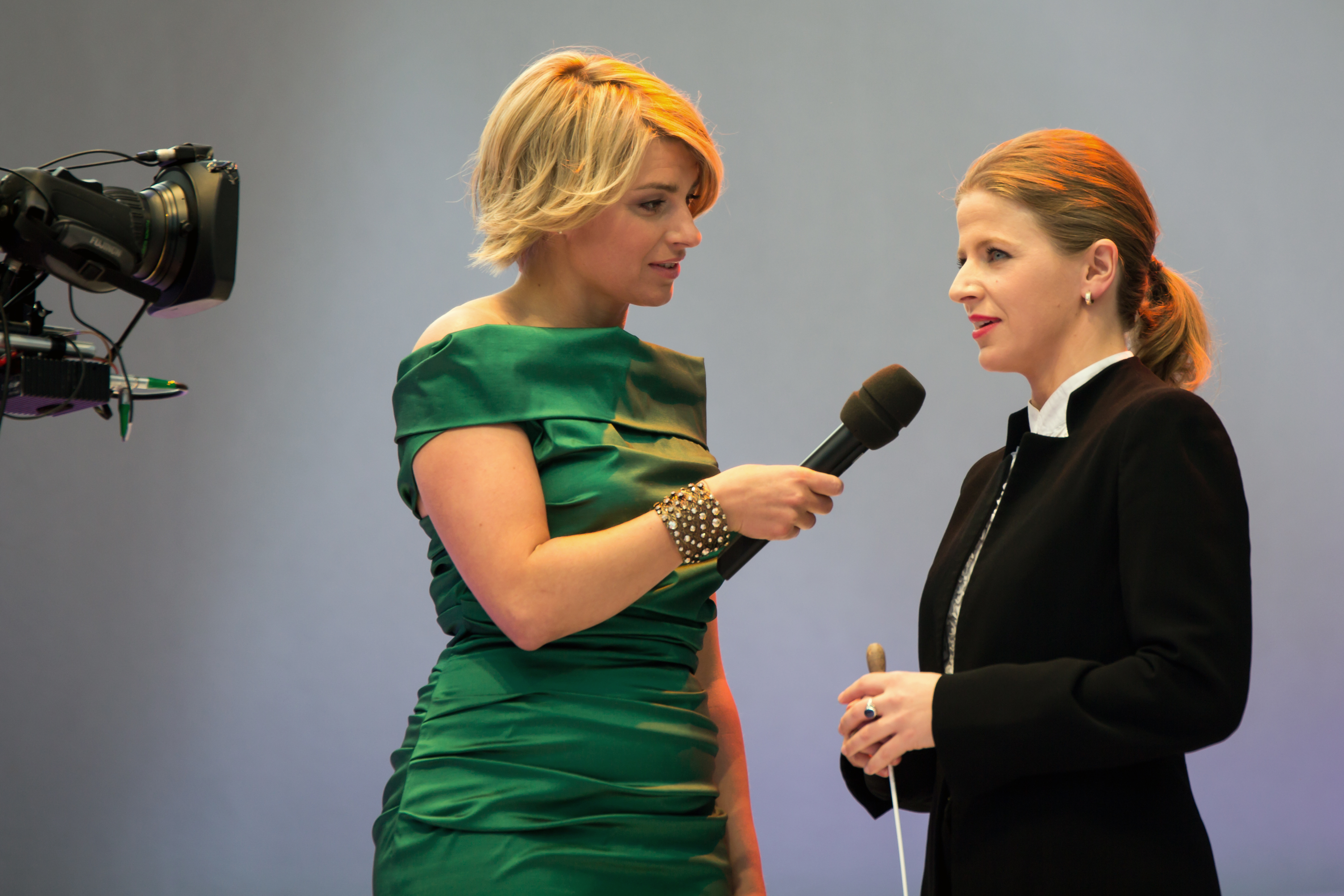
Sabine Heinrich (left) and Kristiina Poska (right) at the Eurovision Young Musicians 2014 final.

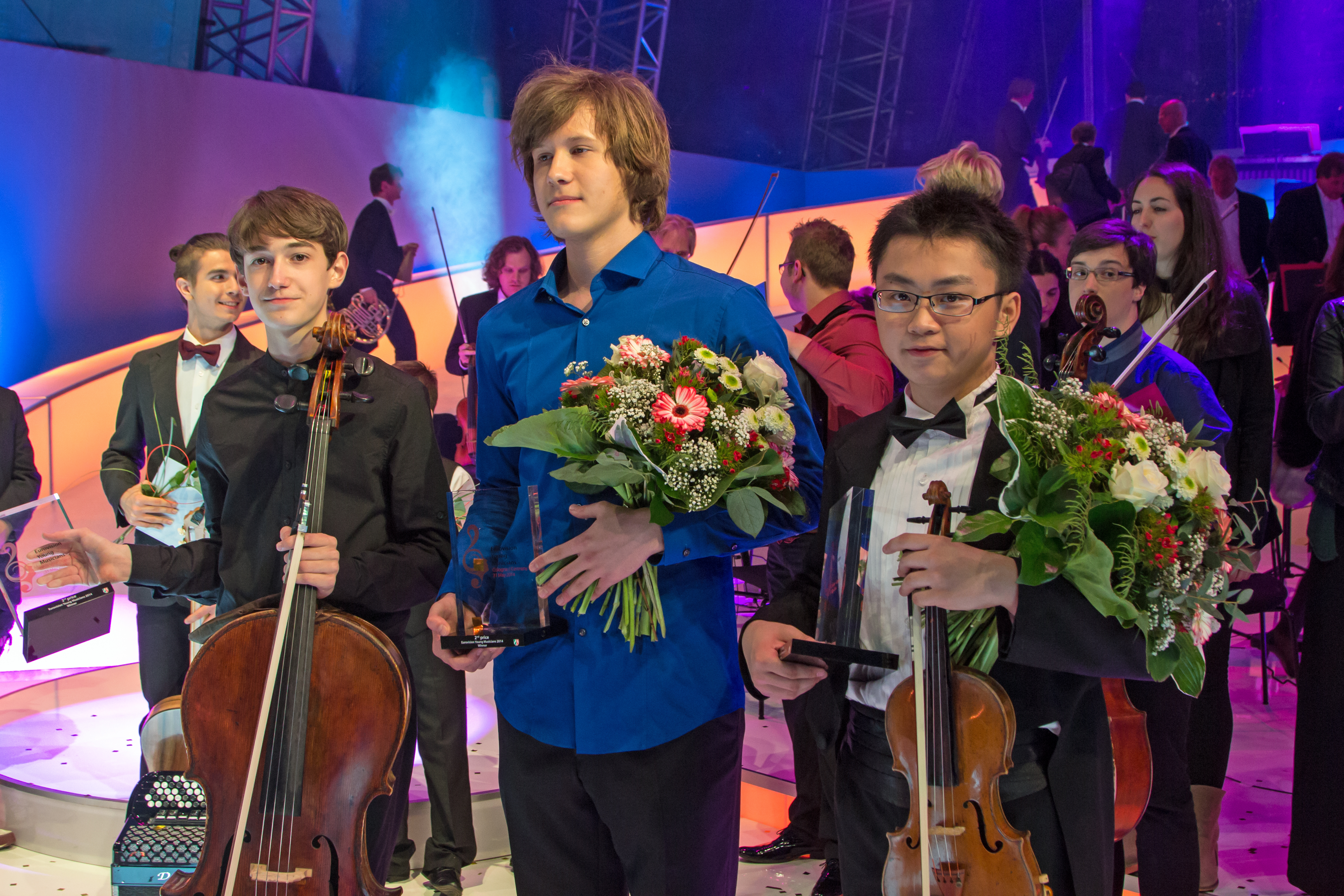
Prize winners: Hungary, Slovenia and Austria

=== Final ===
Awards were given to the top three countries. The table below highlights these using gold, silver, and bronze. The placing results of the remaining participants is unknown and never made public by the European Broadcasting Union.

R/O	Country	Performer	Instrument	Piece	Composer	Result
1	Moldova	Livyka Shtirbu-Sokolov	Piano	Piano concerto	Liviu Shtirbu	
2	Croatia	Sara Domjanić	Violin	Zigeunerweisen, op.20	Pablo de Sarasate	
3	Malta	Kurt Aquilina	Guitar	Concierto de Aranjuez	Joaquín Rodrigo	
4	Hungary	Gergely Devich	Cello	Allegro appassionato Op.43	Camille Saint-Saëns	3
5	Slovenia	Urban Stanič	Piano	Grande polonaise brillante, op. 22 E-flat major	Fryderyk Chopin	2
6	Austria	Ziyu He	Violin	Violin Concerto No. 2	Béla Bartók	1
7	Poland	Bartosz Kołsut	Accordion	Concerto Classico, 1st mov.	Bronisław Kazimierz Przybylski	
8	Netherlands	Lucie Horsch	Recorder	Flautino Concerto in sol maggiore, RV 443	Antonio Vivaldi	
9	Portugal	André Gunko	Cello	Cello Concerto op. 85, 2nd mov. Lento. Allegro molto	Edward Elgar	
10	Greece	Vassilis Digos	Guitar	Concerto in Re	Mario Castelnuovo-Tedesco	
11	Germany	Judith Stapf	Violin	Violin Concerto No. 1 in A minor, Opus 77, 4th mov.: Burlesque: Allegro con brio - Presto	Dmitri Shostakovich	
12	Sweden	Albin Uusijärvi	Viola	Viola concerto, 2nd mov.	William Walton	
13	Czech Republic	Martin Kot	Accordion	Flick-Flack	Albert Vossen	
14	Norway	Sonoko Miriam Welde	Violin	Violin Concerto no 1 in G minor, op. 26, 3rd mov.	Max Bruch	

== Jury members ==
The list of jury members are as follows:

- Austria – Clemens Hellsberg (chairman)
- Germany – Markus Pawlik (Winner of the 1982 Contest)
- Ireland – Carol McGonnell
- Switzerland – Maurice Steger
- Slovenia – Uroš Lajovic

== Broadcasting ==
The contest was broadcast by the following broadcasters:

Date of broadcast	Country	Station
31 May 2014	Croatia	HRT 2
31 May 2014	Czech Republic	ČT art
31 May 2014	Germany	WDR Fernsehen (15-minute delay)
31 May 2014	Greece	ERA 1
31 May 2014	Hungary	M2
31 May 2014	Malta	TVM1 (50-minute delay)
31 May 2014	Moldova	Moldova 1
31 May 2014	Moldova	Radio Moldova
31 May 2014	Norway	NRK1
31 May 2014	Poland	TVP Kultura
31 May 2014	Portugal	Antena 2
31 May 2014	Rest of the world	www.youngmusicians.tv
31 May 2014	Slovenia	TV SLO 2
31 May 2014	Sweden	SVT2
1 June 2014	Greece	ERT1
1 June 2014	Portugal	RTP2
8 June 2014	Austria	ORF 2
9 June 2014	Netherlands	NTR

== Other countries ==
- Belarus – National State Television and Radio Company of the Republic of Belarus (BTRC) informed Oikotimes that they would be withdrawing from Eurovision Young Musicians on 6 January 2014.
- Ukraine – National Television Company of Ukraine (NTU) confirmed to Eurovoix.com that Ukraine would not take part in EYM 2014 on 23 January 2014.

== See also ==
- ABU Radio Song Festival 2014
- ABU TV Song Festival 2014
- Eurovision Song Contest 2014
- Junior Eurovision Song Contest 2014
- Türkvizyon Song Contest 2014
