= Itzhak Rashkovsky =

Russian-Israeli violinist and pedagogue

- יצחק רשקובסקי
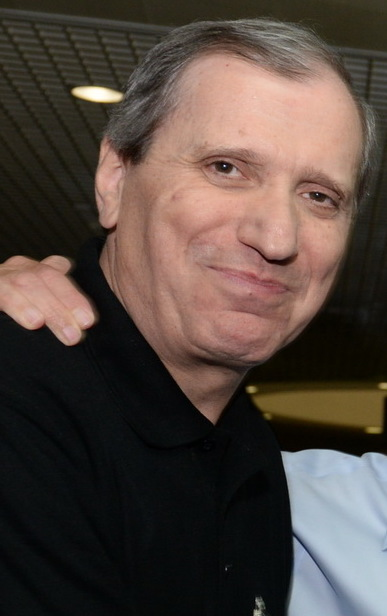
- Itzhak Rashkovsky
- Born: 1955 (age 70–71)
- Occupations: Violinist, pedagogue, music director

Itzhak Rashkovsky (Hebrew: יצחק רשקובסקי; born 1955) is a Ukrainian-Israeli violinist and pedagogue who obtained master's degree from the Israeli Academy of Music where he was under guidance from Yair Kless. He is a music director and one of the founders of the Keshet Eilon's Violin Mastercourse and is a founder and artistic director of the London Music Masters. His works were published by The Strad magazine and prior to it he toured throughout Europe, China, Japan, Canada, the United States and his native Israel, where he gave master classes in violin. He has given masterclasses in Europe, Israel, China, Japan, Canada, and the United States and has been a juror at numerous international competitions, notably Vice Chairman of the jury of the 12th Henryk Wieniawski, Poland and Sion Valais, Switzerland, Yampolsky, Russia, Lipizer, Italy and Hanover, Germany, International Violin Competitions. In 1998 due to his long contributions to music he was awarded Royal College of Music fellowship by Prince Charles. Currently he plays Giovanni Francesco Pressenda's 1831 violin which he loans from Elderberry Foundation. He has performed with his family (Ani Schnarch, Shiry Rashkovsky and Itamar Rashkovsky) in concerts titled 'A Family Affair'. He has taught at the Royal College of Music. He is the teacher of Leia Zhu.
