= Ronald Brautigam =

Dutch concert pianist

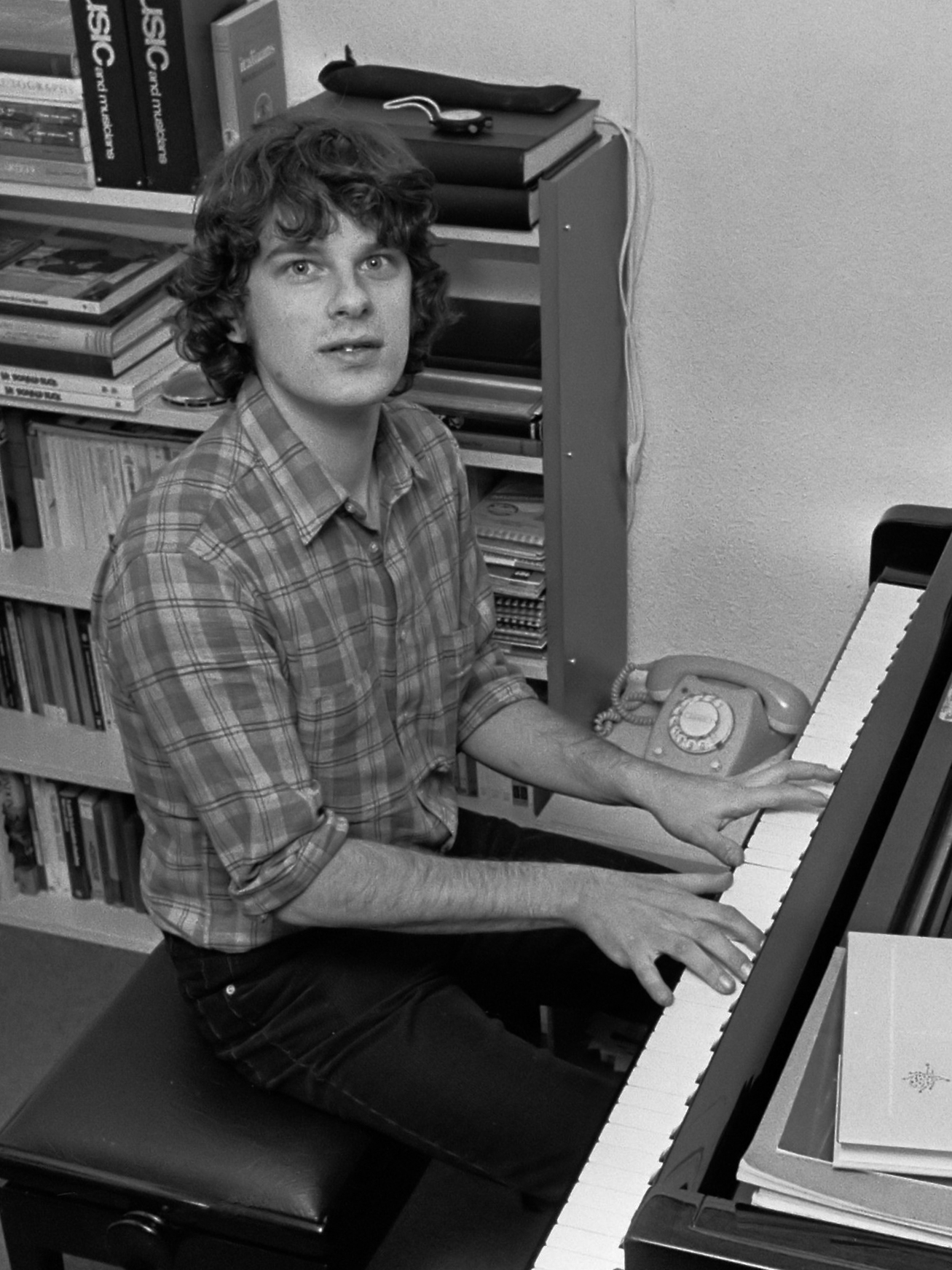
- Ronald Brautigam (1981)
- Born: Ronald Brautigam; 1 October 1954 (age 72); Amsterdam, Netherlands
- Occupation: Classical pianist
- Website: www.ronaldbrautigam.com

Ronald Brautigam (born 1 October 1954) is a Dutch concert pianist, best known for his performances of Haydn, Mozart, Beethoven's piano works on the fortepiano.

Born in Amsterdam, Brautigam studied there with Jan Wijn (1971-79), then he left to study in London with John Bingham (1980-82) and in the United States with Rudolf Serkin (1982-83). His skill as a pianist was recognised by Dutch musicians and in 1984 he was awarded the Nederlandse Muziekprijs. In 2015 his Beethoven recordings received the Edison Award and the annual German Record Critics' Prize.

Brautigam resides in Amsterdam with his wife Mary. Since September 2011, he has been a professor in the University of Music of the Basel Music Academy.

== Recordings ==
- Ronald Brautigam, Isabelle van Keulen (violin). Grieg, Elgar, Sibelius. Music for Violin and Piano. Label: Challenge
- Ronald Brautigam, Isabelle van Keulen (violin). Faure, Poulenc, Debussy. Label: Koch Schwann
- Ronald Brautigam. Joseph Haydn, Wolfgang Amadeus Mozart, Ludwig van Beethoven. Complete works for solo piano. Played on Graf, Walter and Stein fortepiano replicas by Paul McNulty. Label: Bis Records
- Ronald Brautigam. Felix Mendelssohn. Piano Concertos. Played on a Pleyel fortepiano replica by Paul McNulty. Label: Bis Records
- Ronald Brautigam (piano), Peter Masseurs (trumpet), Royal Concertgebouw Orchestra, Riccardo Chailly (conductor). Dmitri Shostakovich, Piano Concerto No.1, Op.35. Played on modern piano. Label: London Classics.
- Ronald Brautigam, Sharon Bezaly (flute). Prokofiev, Schubert, Dutilleux, Jolivet. Works for Flute and Piano. Label: Bis Records.
- Ronald Brautigam, Nobuko Imai. Max Reger. Works for Viola. Label: Bis Records.
