= Eilon =

Hebrew transcription(s)
  - Official: Elon
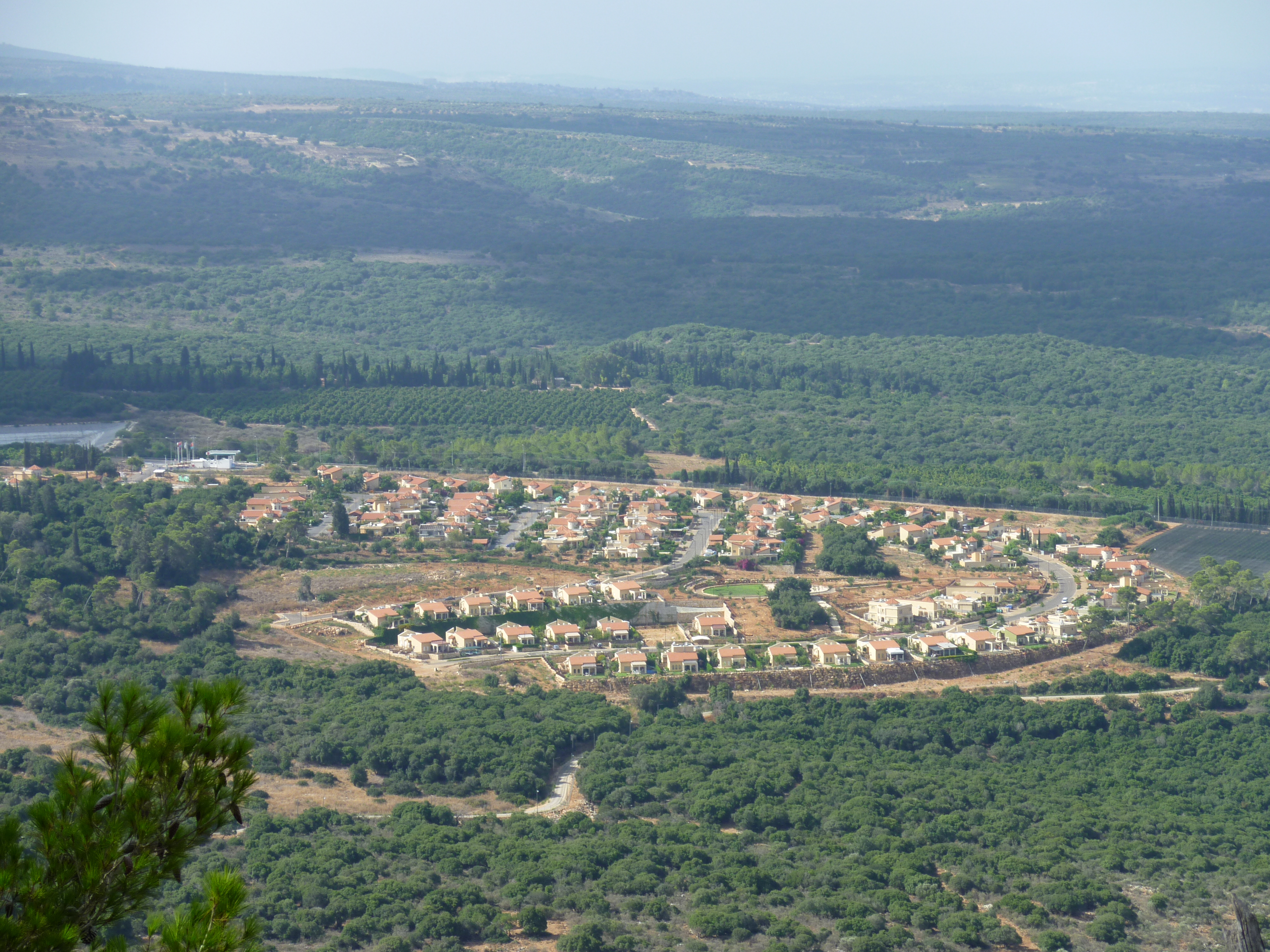

- Location within Northwest Israel Location within Israel
- Coordinates: 33°3′49″N 35°13′14″E
- Country: Israel
- District: Northern
- Subdistrict: Acre
- Council: Mateh Asher
- Affiliation: Kibbutz Movement
- Founded: 1938
- Founder: Polish Jews
- Population (2024): 1,242

Eilon (Hebrew: אֵילוֹן) is a kibbutz in northern Israel. Located a mile south of the Lebanese border and six miles east of the Mediterranean coast, the kibbutz is situated in the Western Galilee on a ridge between two streams, Nahal Betzet and Nahal Kziv. It falls under the jurisdiction of the Mateh Asher Regional Council. As of 2024 it had a population of 1,242..

== Etymology ==
The name "Eilon" is derived from the Hebrew words Elah (pistachio) and Alon (oak), two tree species abundant in this heavily forested area of northern Israel, though specifically referred to the "remnants of ancient trees in the vicinity." The Polish-Jewish immigrants cleared the forest and planted orchards for edible crops that would grow on a rocky hillside, to feed the small population .

== History ==
=== Beginnings ===
The kibbutz, situated a short distance from the Lebanese border, was established in 1938 on 400 dunams of land in Khirbet Samak, which had been purchased by the Jewish National Fund. Eilon was one of the early Tower and Stockade settlements and was settled that year by a group of Polish immigrants and Palestinian Jews. The inhabitants found themselves under constant fire in the wake of the 1936–1939 Arab revolt in Palestine. The kibbutz was initially affiliated with Hashomer Hatzair.

By 1947 the kibbutz had a population of 350, successfully reclaiming rocky land that had been designated by the British Mandatory government as uncultivable.

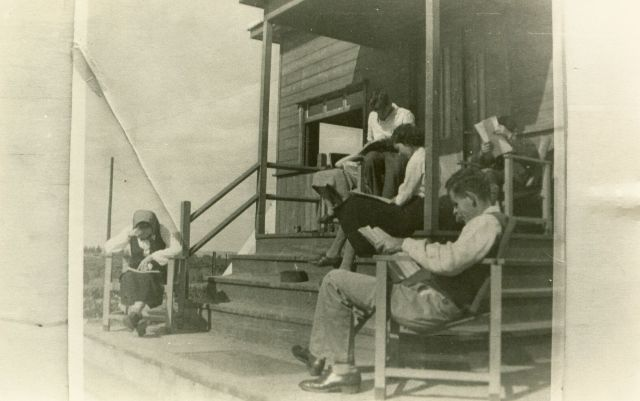
Eilon, ca. 1940

=== 1947-48 war ===
Calm was achieved after the Galilee was cleared of Lebanese troops and Kaukji's bands in November 1948. When the Israeli forces, having just occupied the town of Tarshiha appeared coming up the path the inhabitants defending the kibbutz could hardly believe their good fortune.

== Climate ==
Climate data for Eilon (1991–2020)
Month	Jan	Feb	Mar	Apr	May	Jun	Jul	Aug	Sep	Oct	Nov	Dec	Year
Record high °C (°F)	28.0 (82.4)	30.2 (86.4)	36.7 (98.1)	39.9 (103.8)	40.6 (105.1)	41.5 (106.7)	40.1 (104.2)	40.1 (104.2)	40.3 (104.5)	39.8 (103.6)	34.6 (94.3)	30.5 (86.9)	41.5 (106.7)
Mean daily maximum °C (°F)	16.4 (61.5)	17.3 (63.1)	20.0 (68.0)	23.7 (74.7)	27.1 (80.8)	29.2 (84.6)	30.7 (87.3)	31.3 (88.3)	30.4 (86.7)	28.2 (82.8)	23.4 (74.1)	18.6 (65.5)	24.7 (76.5)
Daily mean °C (°F)	12.5 (54.5)	13.1 (55.6)	15.4 (59.7)	18.5 (65.3)	21.8 (71.2)	24.1 (75.4)	25.9 (78.6)	26.5 (79.7)	25.5 (77.9)	23.3 (73.9)	18.9 (66.0)	14.6 (58.3)	20.0 (68.0)
Mean daily minimum °C (°F)	8.6 (47.5)	8.8 (47.8)	10.7 (51.3)	13.2 (55.8)	16.4 (61.5)	18.9 (66.0)	21.0 (69.8)	21.7 (71.1)	20.6 (69.1)	18.4 (65.1)	14.4 (57.9)	10.6 (51.1)	15.3 (59.5)
Record low °C (°F)	0.0 (32.0)	−1.8 (28.8)	2.4 (36.3)	2.7 (36.9)	9.7 (49.5)	12.8 (55.0)	17.2 (63.0)	17.8 (64.0)	15.5 (59.9)	10.4 (50.7)	5.3 (41.5)	1.5 (34.7)	−1.8 (28.8)
Average precipitation mm (inches)	216.9 (8.54)	147.7 (5.81)	84.7 (3.33)	38.8 (1.53)	13.5 (0.53)	3.4 (0.13)	0.4 (0.02)	0.0 (0.0)	5.5 (0.22)	33.5 (1.32)	99.4 (3.91)	171.9 (6.77)	815.7 (32.11)
Average precipitation days (≥ 1.0 mm)	12.3	10.1	7.2	3.6	1.8	0.4	0.1	0.0	0.7	3.6	6.0	10.3	56.1
Source: NOAA

== Economy ==
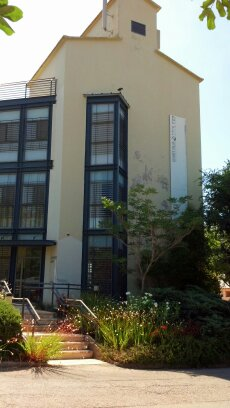
The water tower in Eilon, renovated to house the management office of the Keshet Eilon music centre

- Eshet Eilon, a privately owned factory of agri-industrial systems for sorting vegetables and fruit (see homepage).
- Keshet Eilon Music Center, supporting young string players; 2026 also venue for Rubinstein Competition for young pianists (see homepage)

There are a few small workshops in Eilon, among them:

- Eilon Mosaic, which manufactures decorative mosaics (see homepage)
- a recording studio
- Oren Meiri's studio of traditional Japanese carpentry (see homepage)
- a studio for building Mizrahi (oriental) musical instruments

=== Places of interest ===
Eilon houses an archaeological collection of artefacts dating back to the Neolithic, Chalcolithic and Iron Age, which were mainly salvaged from the Khirbet Jelĩl site near Moshav Goren.

== Volunteers ==
Between the years 1967-2000 Eilon used to accept a number of international volunteers that in return for lodgings, meals and laundry, worked in a variety of locations on the kibbutz. One of the highlights of being a volunteer used to be the Vollies (Volunteers) Bar, which was situated close to the volunteers quarters.

== See also ==
- Or Torah Synagogue of Akko, decorated with mosaics produced by Eilon Mosaics
