= Sabine Heinrich =

German radio and television presenter (born 1976)

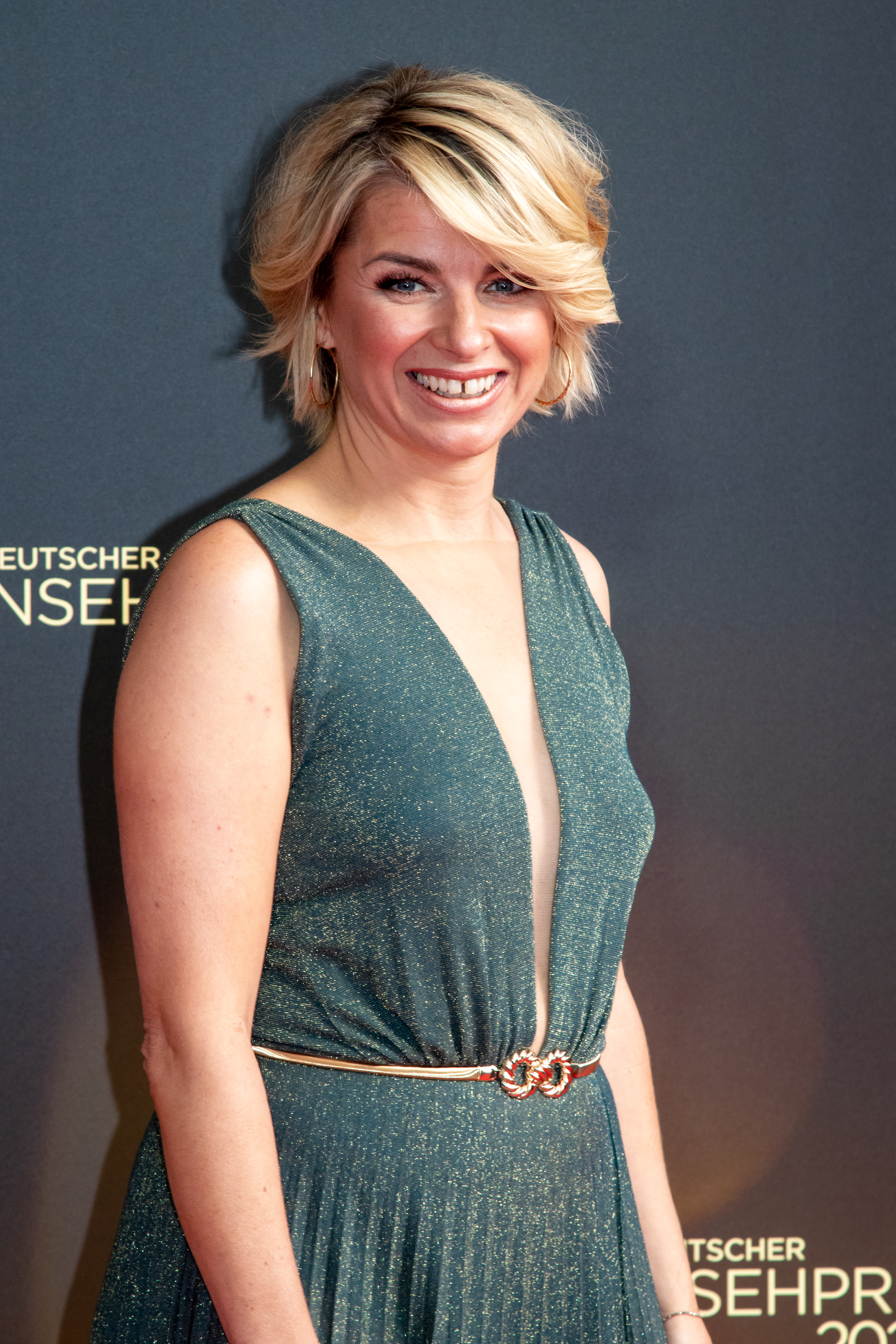
- Born: 27 December 1976 (age 49); Unna, North Rhine-Westphalia, West Germany
- Occupations: Radio and television presenter
- Years active: 2001–present

Sabine Heinrich (born 27 December 1976 in Unna, North Rhine-Westphalia, West Germany) is a German radio and television presenter.

== Career ==
Heinrich worked at the radio station 1LIVE in Cologne from 2001 until June 2016. At 1LIVE she presented the morning show 1LIVE mit Frau Heinrich (1LIVE with Mrs Heinrich) which ran from 10 am to 2 pm. Before her tenure at 1LIVE was editor at various newspapers and radio stations, including Antenne Unna and Radio NRW as well as the Hellweger Anzeiger where she collaborated with editor Matthias Aust. Since June 2016 Sabine Heinrich has been presenting various shows at WDR 2.

In 2006 she presented her first television show. With her co-host Thorsten Schorn she hosted ten episodes of the live show Schorn & Heinrich on WDR television. In 2008 she presented the aftershow party to the 1LIVE Krone also at WDR television.

From early February to early March 2010, she jointly hosted with Matthias Opdenhövel the talent show Unser Star für Oslo (Our Star for Oslo) by Stefan Raab, the preselection to the Eurovision Song Contest in Oslo which was running both on the television channels Das Erste and ProSieben. They teamed also up at the 2010 ECHO music awards in Berlin. On the evening of the Eurovision Song Contest on 29 May 2010, the duo hosted the preliminary reports in Das Erste and the Eurovision party in Hamburg before and after the song contest.

From late January to mid February 2011, she collaborated again with Opdenhövel when they hosted the show Unser Song für Deutschland (Our song for Germany) to find an entry for Lena Meyer-Landrut at the Eurovision Song Contest in Düsseldorf.

In mid-2010 she joined the team of the constantly changing outdoor reporters for the WDR show Zimmer frei (Vacancy). In addition she hosted the daily magazine Einsweiter (Next One) on the digital television channel Einsfestival. Since September 2011 Heinrich has a weekly talk show on Einsfestival, the 1LIVE Talk mit Frau Heinrich (1LIVE Talk with Mrs. Heinrich) which runs Tuesdays at 9pm. In 2014, she hosted the Eurovision Young Musicians in Cologne.

== Awards ==
- On 9 October 2010, the team of Our Star for Oslo (including Jörg Grabosch, Stefan Raab, Matthias Opdenhövel, Sabine Heinrich, and Lena Meyer-Landrut) won the German Television Award for Best Entertainment show
- On 8 September 2011, she received the German Radio Award for her radio show 1LIVE with Mrs Heinrich as best presenter.
