= Liza Ferschtman =

Dutch classical violinist

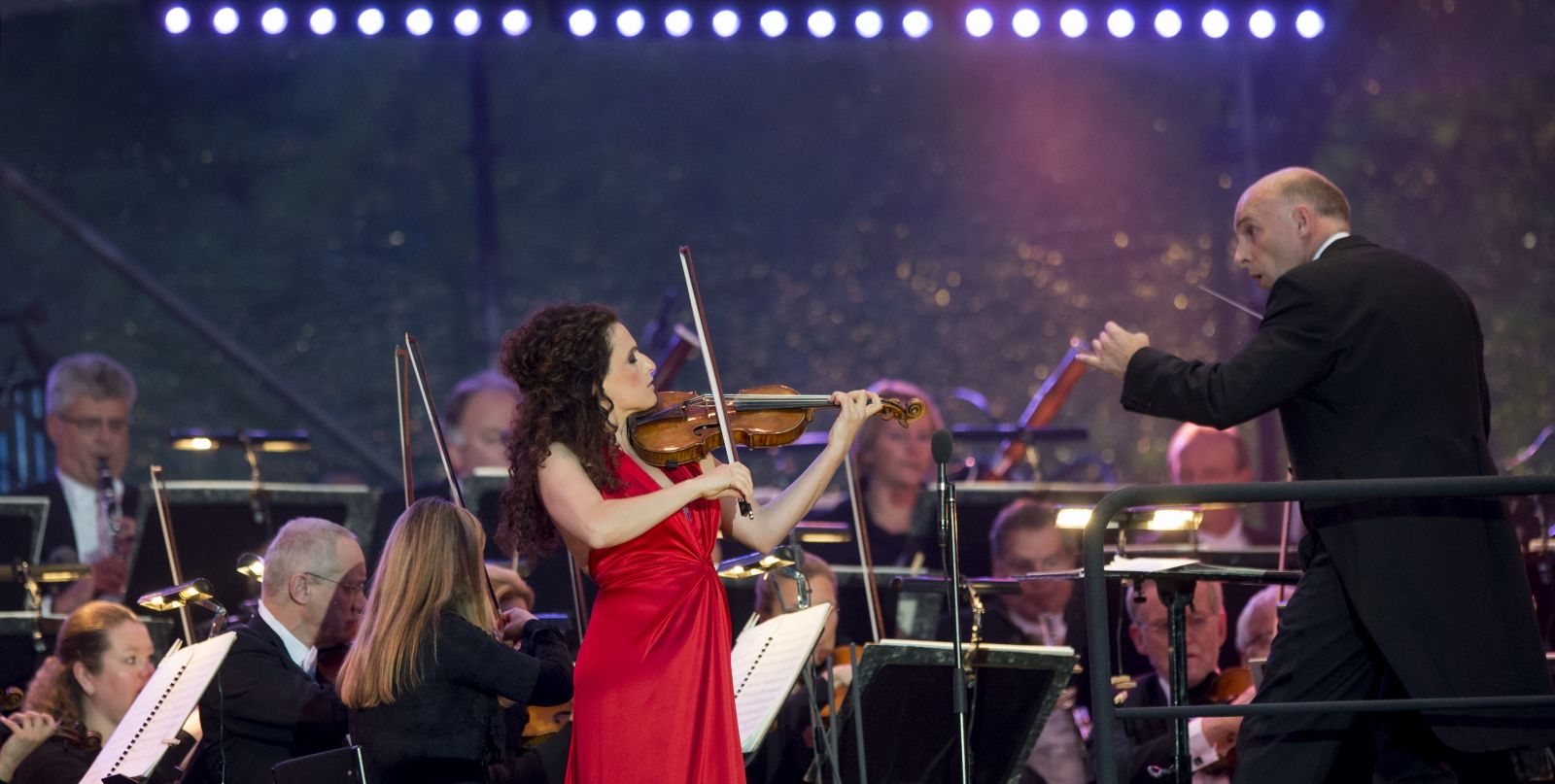
- Ferschtman in concert in 2004, conducted by Arjan Tien
- Born: 1979 (age 46–47); Hilversum, Netherlands
- Education: Royal Conservatory of The Hague; Conservatorium van Amsterdam; Curtis Institute of Music; Guildhall School of Music and Drama
- Occupations: Classical violinist; Music festival director
- Awards: Nederlandse Muziekprijs

Liza Ferschtman (born 1979) is a Dutch classical violinist who appears internationally, both as a soloist with orchestra and in chamber music. She received the Nederlandse Muziekprijs in 2006 and has directed the Delft Chamber Music Festival since 2007.

== Education ==
Ferschtman was born in Hilversum in a musical family of Russian Jews, the daughter of the cellist Dmitri Ferschtman and the pianist Mila Baslawskaja. At the age of five she began studying with the violinist Philippe Hirschhorn, a friend of the family, and thereafter with Ivry Gitlis, Igor Oistrach and Aaron Rosand. She studied later at the Royal Conservatory of The Hague with Qui van Woerdekom, at the Conservatorium van Amsterdam with Herman Krebbers, at the Curtis Institute of Music with Ida Kavafian, and at the Guildhall School of Music and Drama with David Takeno.

== Solo performances ==
Ferschtman has appeared as a soloist with the Concertgebouw Orchestra, the Rotterdam Philharmonic Orchestra, Orchestre National de Belgique, Yomiuri Nippon Symphony Orchestra, Malaysian Philharmonic Orchestra, the Schleswig-Holstein Festival Orchestra and the Bremer Philharmoniker. She also played with the Prague Philharmonia, Franz Liszt Chamber Orchestra, the Netherlands Student Orchestra and the Sweelinck Orchestra. She has collaborated with conductors such as Frans Brüggen, Christoph von Dohnányi, Iván Fischer, Neeme Järvi, Lev Markiz, Shlomo Mintz, Mendi Rodan, Leonard Slatkin and Jaap van Zweden, among others. In 2017, she played Alban Berg's Violin Concerto "To the memory of an angel" with the Nordwestdeutsche Philharmonie, conducted by Dirk Kaftan.

== Chamber music ==
In 2005 and 2006 Ferschtman performed the complete violin sonatas of Ludwig van Beethoven in the Concertgebouw with pianist Inon Barnatan. The duo also played in Europe, including Austria, Belgium, England, France, Germany, Russia and Switzerland. In 2006 the duo played recitals in New York City. Concerts in the Concertgebouw for the 10th anniversary of the Zondagochtendconcert and an open-air solo concert were broadcast on Dutch television.

Since 2007 Ferschtman has been artistic director of the Delft Chamber Music Festival, which was founded by the violinist Isabelle van Keulen in 1996. She has added vocal music and contemporary music to the program, such as in 2016 Weill's Die sieben Todsünden, a new string octet and a concert of the Tallis Scholars.

In 2014, she performed with members of the Beethoven Orchester Bonn a chamber music concert in the Beethoven House, works for string trio by Schubert, Ernst von Dohnányi and György Kurtág, and the piano quartet in C minor, Op. 60, by Johannes Brahms. With harpsichord player Jonathan Cohen, she performed the entirety of Heinrich Biber's Rosary Sonatas in 2016, to positive acclaim. The different violin tunings required Ferschtman to have seven violins on stage; the performance was deemed a "rare tour de force".

== Awards ==
In 1994 Ferschtman was awarded first prize at the competition Iordens Viooldagen. In 1997 she was awarded a prize at the Nationaal Vioolconcours Oskar Back. In 2003 she was awarded second prize at the International violin competition in Sion. On 24 November 2006, she was awarded the Nederlandse Muziekprijs.

== Selected recordings ==
Her first recording was in 2004; chamber music with the pianist Bas Verheijden, including César Franck's Violin Sonata, Poulenc's Violin Sonata, Debussy's Violin Sonata, and music by Stravinsky, Tchaikovsky and Shostakovitch. Ferschtman recorded in 2007 Beethoven's Violin Sonata in G major, Op. 96 (1812) and Schubert's Fantasia for piano and violin in C major "Sei mir gegrüßt", D 934, with the pianist Inon Barnatan. A reviewer wrote: "Their playing has that rare combination of freshness and unanimity, as though two like-minded friends are conversing about something dear to their hearts." In 2009, she recorded violin concertos by Julius Röntgen with the Staatsphilharmonie Rheinland-Pfalz, conducted by David Porcelijn. Her tone was described as "nimble but never narrow", and her playing as "infusing every phrase with life and energy". She recorded in 2010 Beethoven's Violin Concerto and his Romances with the Netherlands Symphony Orchestra conducted by Jan Willem de Vriend. A reviewer noted that, on top of her "purity of tone and absolute singing quality" there is also "a sense of collaboration and amicable teamwork" based on her work as a chamber musician.
