= Nederlandse Muziekprijs =

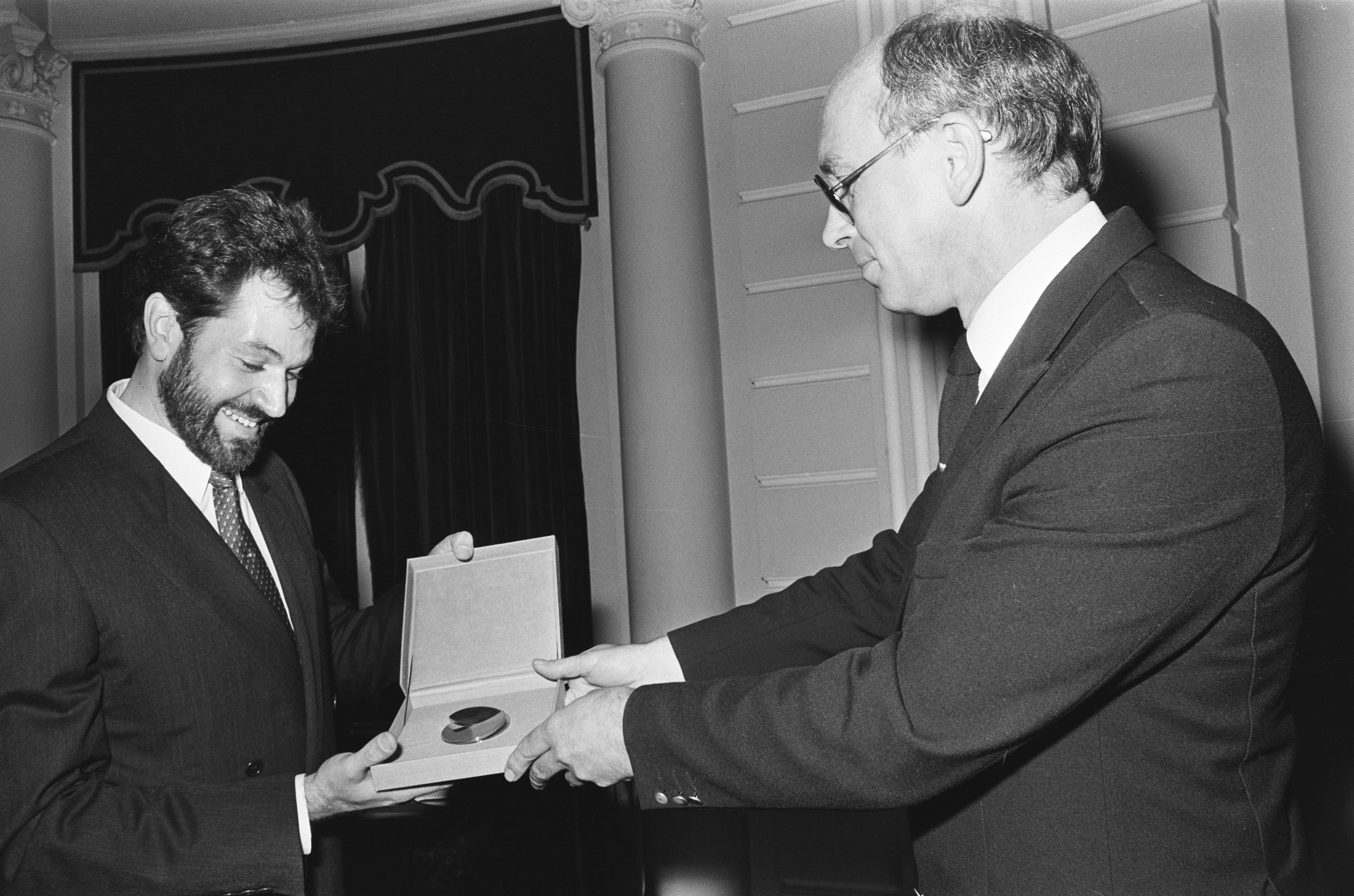

The Nederlandse Muziekprijs (literal translation, Dutch Music Prize) is an honour bestowed by the Dutch Ministry of Education, Culture and Science to a musician working in classical music. It is the highest such honour in Dutch music.

The Nederlandse Muziekprijs is awarded on the recommendation of the Advisory Committee for the Dutch Music Prize. The Fund for Amateur Art and Performing Arts (Fonds Amateurkunst en Podiumkunsten; FAPK) initially dispersed the awards. Beginning in 2007, by the Dutch Fund for Performing Arts+ (Nederlands Fonds voor Podiumkunsten) supervised the awards. In 2010, the Performing Arts Fund (Fonds Podiumkunsten) took over the awards. The advisory committee follows the candidate for a period of two years, during which the candidate undertakes a study program agreed by the committee. At the end of the study process, the committee decides after a concert or exam whether to award the prize.

== Winners ==
- 1981: Hans Roelofsen (contrabass)
- 1984: Ronald Brautigam (piano)
- 1984: Jard van Nes (mezzosoprano)
- 1985: Wout Oosterkamp (bass-baritone)
- 1987: Martijn van den Hoek (piano)
- 1987: Olga de Roos (saxophone)
- 1988: Jacob Slagter (horn)
- 1989: Theodora Geraets (violin)
- 1991: Arno Bornkamp (saxophone)
- 1992: Pieter Wispelwey (cello)
- 1993: Manja Smits (harp)
- 1994: Quirine Viersen (cello)
- 1996: Godelieve Schrama (harp)
- 1997: Geert Smits (baritone)
- 1999: Pauline Oostenrijk (oboe)
- 2003: Janine Jansen (violin)
- 2004: Jörgen van Rijen (trombone)
- 2006: Liza Ferschtman (violin)
- 2007: Gwyneth Wentink (harp)
- 2008: Christianne Stotijn (mezzosoprano)
- 2009: Lavinia Meijer (harp)
- 2009: Bram van Sambeek (bassoon)
- 2010: Ties Mellema (saxophone)
- 2010: Erik Bosgraaf (recorder)
- 2010: Izhar Elias (guitar)
- 2010: Henk Neven (baritone)
- 2012: Rick Stotijn (contrabass)
- 2016: Hannes Minnaar (piano)
- 2016: Remy van Kesteren (harp)
- 2017: Rob van de Laar (horn)
- 2018: Peter Gijsbertsen (tenor)
- 2018: Maria Milstein (violin)
- 2019: Dominique Vleeshouwers (percussion)
- 2020: Lucie Horsch (recorder)
- 2021: Sebastiaan Kemner (trombone)
- 2022: Thomas Beijer (piano)
- 2023: Raoul Steffani (baritone)
- 2024: Laurent de Man (organ)
- 2024: Elisabeth Hetherington (soprano)
- 2025: Vincent van Amsterdam (accordion)
