= TwoSet Violin =

YouTube comedy duo and classical musicians

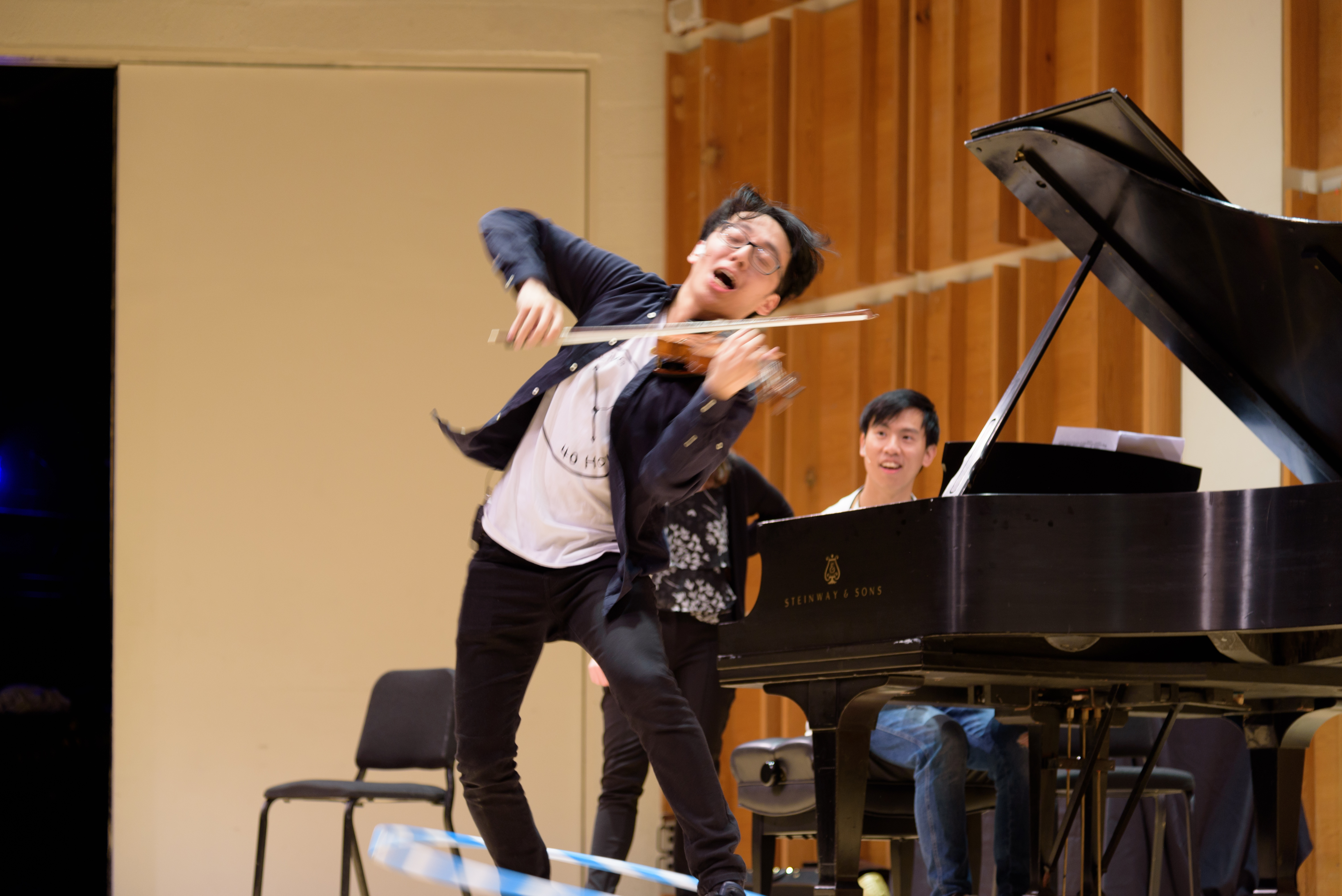
- TwoSet Violin (Brett Yang playing the violin while hula hooping, accompanied by Eddy Chen on the piano), Merkin Concert Hall, New York City on 31 October 2018.
- Born: Brett Yang; 3 March 1992 (age 34); Taipei, Taiwan Eddy Chen; 23 March 1993 (age 33); Kaohsiung, Taiwan
- Other names: Chinese: 雙琴俠; pinyin: Shuāng qín xiá
- Education: Queensland Conservatorium Griffith University (both)
- Occupations: Musician; YouTuber

TikTok information
- Page: twosetviolin
- Followers: 1.2 million

YouTube information
- Channel: TwoSetViolin
- Years active: 2013–2024; 2025-present
- Genres: Comedy; Music
- Subscribers: 4.38 million
- Views: 1.52 billion
- Last updated: 15 April 2026
- Website: www.twosetviolin.com

TwoSet Violin is a musical comedy duo consisting of Australian-Taiwanese violinists and YouTubers Brett Yang (Chinese: 楊博堯; pinyin: Yáng Bóyáo; Wade–Giles: Yang² Po²-Yao²) and Eddy Chen (Chinese: 陳韋丞; pinyin: Chén Wéichéng; Wade–Giles: Chên² ²Wei-Chêng²). They began by posting classical covers of pop music on their YouTube channel before shifting their focus to musical comedy videos, which gained them greater viewership. In addition to their online content, Yang and Chen have also performed in live concerts and tours.

== Early life and education ==
Brett Yang was born on 3 March 1992 in Taipei, Taiwan, and Eddy Chen on 23 March 1993 in Kaohsiung, Taiwan. Both moved with their families first to New Zealand and then to Brisbane, Queensland, Australia, before adolescence.

They met as young teens in an after-school maths group and became acquainted as the youngest members of a youth orchestra and later as students at the Queensland Conservatorium Griffith University in Brisbane.

== Early musical careers ==
In 2012, Yang debuted at Queensland Conservatorium performing the Tchaikovsky Violin Concerto. He later worked with various other Australian orchestras, including a performance at the 2014 G20 Brisbane summit.

Chen was a finalist for the 2014 National Young Virtuoso Award in Queensland and played with the Queensland Symphony Orchestra and the Melbourne Symphony Orchestra.

== As TwoSet Violin (2013–2024) ==
In 2013, the duo started posting covers of pop music played on the violin on a YouTube channel. Yang said that they had viewed violin virtuosos playing covers that had garnered millions of views on YouTube; the two attempted the same but to minimal reaction. Discovering that Taiwanese-Australian violinist Ray Chen made comedic videos, they shifted their content production in a similar direction, focusing their videos on their lives at conservatory as classical musicians and as students, which led to a dramatic increase in viewership. At the end of 2016, Yang and Chen resigned their places in the Sydney Symphony Orchestra and the Queensland Symphony Orchestra respectively to begin performing live concerts of their own.

The TwoSet Violin YouTube channel received a Silver Play Button in 2018 for surpassing 100 thousand subscribers and a Gold Play Button in 2019 for surpassing 1 million subscribers. Classic FM's Kyle Macdonald listed TwoSet Violin as one of the "10 ways the 2010s changed classical music forever".

In January 2020, it was announced that the duo would be attending that year's Menuhin Competition, held at Richmond, Virginia, as roving reporters; the competition was postponed due to the COVID-19 pandemic.

On 8 February 2020, TwoSet Violin live-streamed a performance of Tchaikovsky's Violin Concerto to celebrate their achievement of two million subscribers. Yang played the solo part while Chen performed an original arrangement of the orchestral component for solo violin.

In December 2020, the duo announced a temporary hiatus from YouTube while Yang addressed some health issues. The duo made a slow return to content creation in January 2021.

On 30 January 2021, to celebrate their achievement of 3 million YouTube subscribers, TwoSet Violin live-streamed another performance, of Sibelius's Violin Concerto, with Chen playing the solo while Yang performed an arrangement of the orchestral component for solo violin. In May 2021, they posted videos to support the Menuhin Competition.

In June 2022, TwoSet Violin posted "FANTASIA", a short film written by the duo. It contained several pieces composed by themselves and Jordon He, consisting of the 'Prelude', one that they had already released in October 2020, as well as three new pieces: 'Scherzo', 'Adagio', and 'Rhapsody'. The film also includes a guest appearance of Chloe Chua.

On 7 August 2022, TwoSet Violin released a song featuring a fictional band named B^{2}TSM, in which classical composers Bach, Beethoven, Tchaikovsky, Shostakovich, and Mozart are played by the duo in an accompanying music video.

In October 2022, TwoSet released a music video titled "Sell Out", a parody of Blackpink's song "Shut Down". Chen had impersonated classical composer and violinist Paganini in a previous video, which imagined how he might have critiqued "Shut Down" for using only two bars from La Campanella. Blackpink fans, many of whom thought that Chen was Paganini and that the composer was still alive, reacted fiercely. TwoSet later said it was great to raise awareness of the classical composer.

On 16 November 2022, to celebrate their upcoming 4 million subscribers achievement, TwoSet Violin live-streamed a performance of Mendelssohn's Violin Concerto in E minor, Op. 64 and Bach's Concerto in D minor for Two Violins, BWV 1043 with support by the Singapore Symphony Orchestra at the Victoria Concert Hall. In February 2023, they hosted a music battle at the Star Performing Arts Centre in Singapore with YouTuber bassist Davie504. In November 2023, the group was featured on Australian Story on ABC TV.

The duo toured Australia in 2024, and appeared once again in capital cities across Australia and New Zealand in June 2026.

== Break from content creation and break up (2024–2026) ==
The profile picture of TwoSet Violin's YouTube channel was temporarily changed to the B2TSM logo.

On 14 October 2024, the duo announced that they would stop producing content under the name "TwoSet Violin". Most of their Instagram posts were deleted, and the majority of the videos on their YouTube channel were taken down, leaving only 29 that they considered to be the "crème de la crème". On 5 December 2024, the channel was rebranded to match the theme of their fictional band "B^{2}TSM", although their channel name stayed the same. A day later, as B^{2}TSM, the first of six farewell music videos was posted to YouTube.

It was later revealed in a livestream that their intent was to temporarily present their channel "like we're just teleporting to B^{2}TSM universe ... for these six videos it's just B^{2}TSM". They believed their fans were no longer watching their old content, so they only left up what they thought were their best pieces of content for newcomers. However, due to backlash from fans, they made the decision to restore all their old videos onto their channel.

After taking a few months' hiatus, on 2 April 2025, the duo posted a video simply titled "Hi" where they explained that they had been taking a break from work by traveling and practicing the violin, but now felt ready to return to YouTube. Following the period, they uploaded videos semi-regularly.

=== Parting ways ===
On 13 October 2026, the duo uploaded a video entitled "It’s been a fun journey", announcing that they were parting way in order to pursue individual creative projects. During the video, they reflected on the channel's history and stated that they were unable to continue maintaining the channel long-term. Additionally, while they stated the video was not a full farewell, "audiences should not expect a continuation of the channel in its previous form."

== Tours ==
With KickStarter as their primary fundraising method, along with street performance in Sydney, TwoSet raised enough money to go on a worldwide tour in 2017 to 11 cities in 10 countries throughout Asia and Europe, including Taipei, Helsinki, and Frankfurt.

In 2018, they performed in several places in the United States including New York City, San Francisco, and Los Angeles.

In October 2019, TwoSet announced another world tour where they planned to visit multiple locations in Oceania, Europe, Asia and North America. However, the tour was postponed as a result of the COVID-19 pandemic, and a virtual world tour event was held instead on 28 December 2021.

On 16 November 2022, they announced an upcoming world tour for 2023 and 2024, later releasing their official announcement on their YouTube channel and a list of the 29 cities that they will be touring, with dates posted subsequently.

On 12 March 2024, TwoSet announced an upcoming world tour for 2025 and 2026 entitled Sacrilegious Games and later began to release dates and locations on their website. On 15 May, Yang's visa application to work temporarily in the United States was denied, despite being "exactly the same" as Chen's. This caused some shows in the world tour to be postponed. Later, Yang's second visa application was accepted. The first show of the tour, scheduled for 27 September in Vancouver, Canada, was cancelled as the Vancouver Symphony Orchestra went on strike, demanding higher wages. As a result, TwoSet created two new shows in Vancouver, one on 9 November and one on 10 November.

== Videos and themes ==
In 2017, TwoSet Violin made a comedic reference to Ling Ling, a fictional violinist who "practices 40 hours a day". In an interview with Yle Uutiset, they described Ling Ling as the final boss of a video game: the Chuck Norris of violinists. Chen said they improvised the character from their comedy sketch video concerning a teenage violin student's tiger mom comparing the student to her friend's child. In 2018, they released a series of videos called the Ling Ling Workout. In these challenges, the duo play classical pieces (or contemporary music) with handicaps such as playing at double speed, with scordatura, while dancing or hula hooping, with hand positions reversed, or while upside down. Prominent violinists such as Ray Chen, Ziyu He, and Hilary Hahn have also attempted the challenge on their channel.

Other recurring themes include violin charades, trying out various instruments, and viola jokes.

In July 2018, they released a series of videos in which they performed classical music using rubber chickens.

Another popular video series consists of reviews of film and TV show scenes that feature violin playing, in which Yang and Chen critique egregiously fake performances. On April Fools' Day 2019, they claimed they discovered a new Double Violin Concerto by J.S. Bach.

In September 2018, TwoSet Violin uploaded a reaction video to a BBC News story titled "Fastest Violinist in the World", in which they challenged violinist Ben Lee's Guinness World Record claim of playing "Flight of the Bumblebee" for what they perceived to be significant inaccuracy. They satirically timed themselves purposefully playing random fast notes before declaring they had broken the world record.

== Other ventures ==
TwoSet has a clothing line called TwoSet Apparel.

TwoSet has a podcast called TwoSet Talks.
