= Judith Stapf =

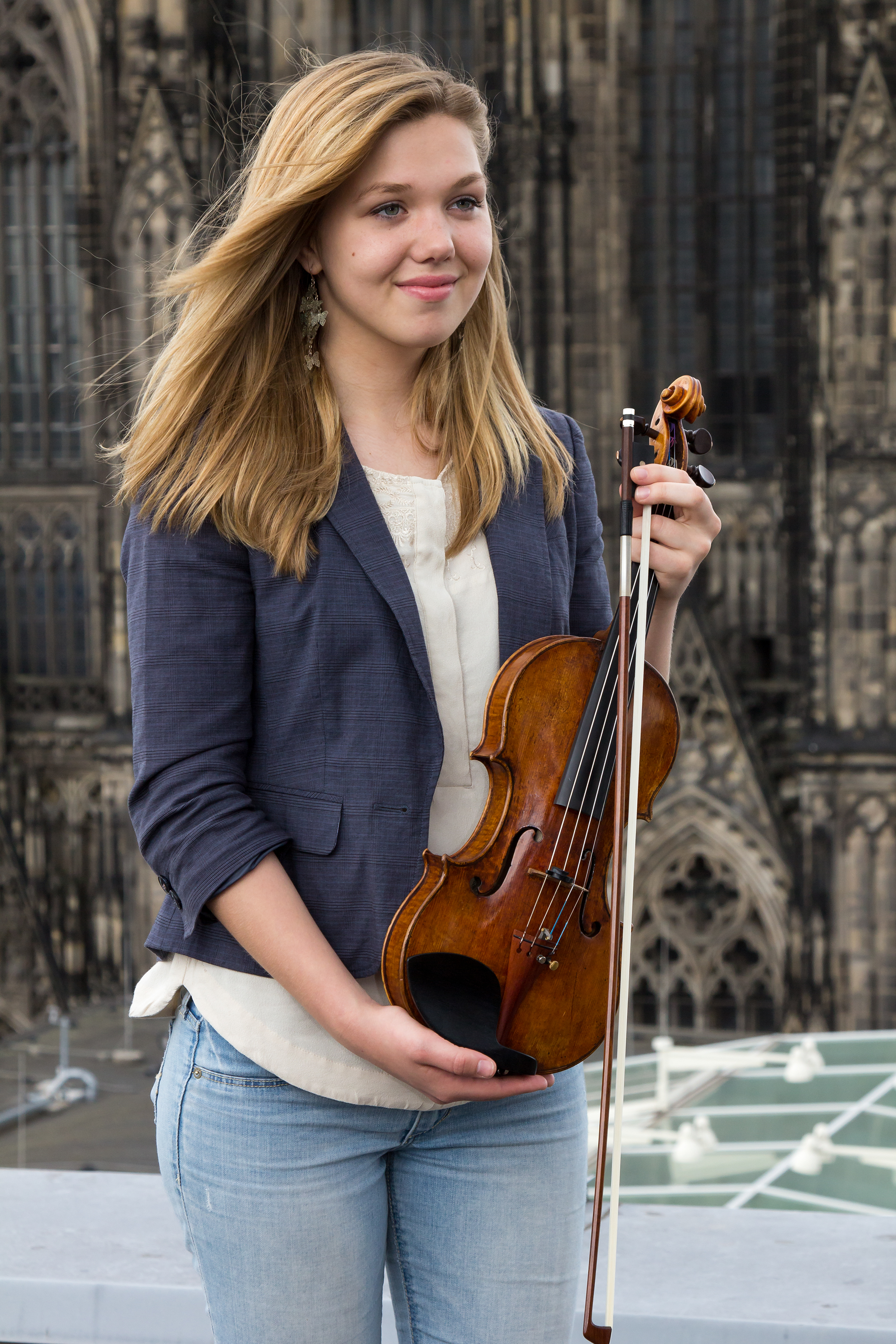
- Stapf in 2014

Background information
- Born: 31 May 1997 (age 29); Rheinbach, Nordrhein-Westfalen, Germany
- Genre: Classical
- Instrument: Violin

Judith Stapf (born 31 May 1997) is a German classical violinist.

== Biography ==
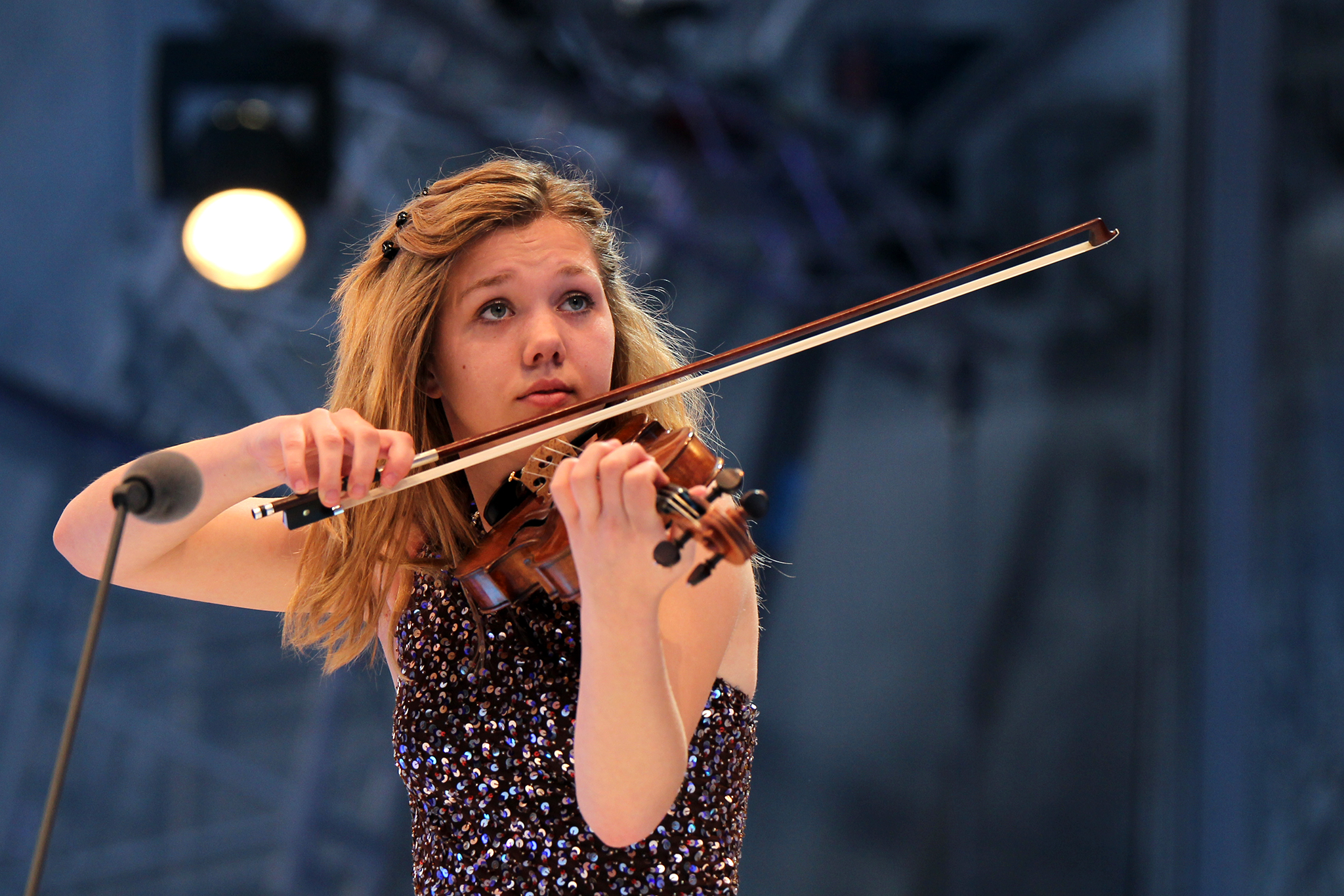
Stapf at the dress rehearsal of the Eurovision Young Musicians 2014

Born in Rheinbach, Nordrhein-Westfalen, Stapf received violin lessons at the age of three. At a children's concert in the Frankfurter Alte Oper she had her first concert appearance at the age of eight. She had her first appearances as a soloist at the age of ten in the Cologne Basilica St. Maria im Kapitol and in the Kölner Philharmonie, afterwards also at the Schleswig-Holstein Musik Festival and the Festspiele Mecklenburg-Vorpommern.

After having been taught privately or as part of international master classes until 2008, she attended the Hochschule für Musik und Tanz Köln from 2008 as a participant of the Pre-College Cologne. She regularly studied at this university from 2013 to 2018.

In spring 2014 the Westdeutscher Rundfunk nominated her as a German participant in the Eurovision Young Musicians 2014 competition. She performed there in the finale Dmitri Shostakovich's Burleske aus op. 77 with the WDR Sinfonieorchester Köln.

In 2016 she appeared as a guest in the concert series "Junge Elite" at the Festspiele Mecklenburg-Vorpommern.

From 2016 to 2018 she belonged to the first generation of students at the newly founded Barenboim–Said Akademie in Berlin.

Since the winter semester 2018/2019 she has been studying in the Master's programme at the Universität der Künste Berlin.

Stapf plays a violin by Andrea Guarneri.

=== Judith Stapf and Jerzy Gross ===
At the age of ten Stapf came across the title melody of Spielberg's film Schindler's List, a violin piece interpreted by Itzhak Perlman by the composer John Williams. Out of interest for the background of the play she made contact with the Holocaust-survivor Jerzy Gross in 2008. The former violinist belonged to the so-called "Schindler's juden", who had worked for the entrepreneur Oskar Schindler and were saved from murder in the extermination camp. The exchange of several years between Stapf and Gross led to the book Spiel mir das Lied vom Leben - Judith und der Junge von Schindlers Liste by Angela Krumpen in 2011. For the Westdeutscher Rundfunk Martin Buchholz documented a common journey to Poland to stations of Gross's suffering. Since 19 November 2015, an Internet website has been in existence that focuses on the encounter between Judith Stapf and Jerzy Gross. In January 2018 she played "Nigun" by Ernest Bloch in the German Bundestag in the commemoration hour for the victims of National Socialism.

== Awards ==
- 1st Federal Prize at Jugend musiziert in 2010 and 2013
- Fifth prize at the VII. International Rotary Children Music Competition in Moscow 2009
- Premier Prix at the 20e Concours International Flame in Paris, 2009
- 1st prize at the International Max Bruch Competition, 2011
- 1st Prize Mary Smart Competition of the Summit Music Festival New York City, USA, 2012
- 2nd Prize Ferdinand-Trimborn Competition, 2012
- Beethoven Bonnensis Award, Bonn, 2012
- Scholarship of the Deutsche Stiftung Musikleben, 2013
- Scholarship of the Studienstiftung des Deutschen Volkes, 2015
- Young Musician Award of the State of NRW in the category Music, 2015
- Scholarship of the Werner Richard - Dr. Carl Dörken Foundation, 2017 and 2019
