= Arno Bornkamp =

Dutch classical saxophonist

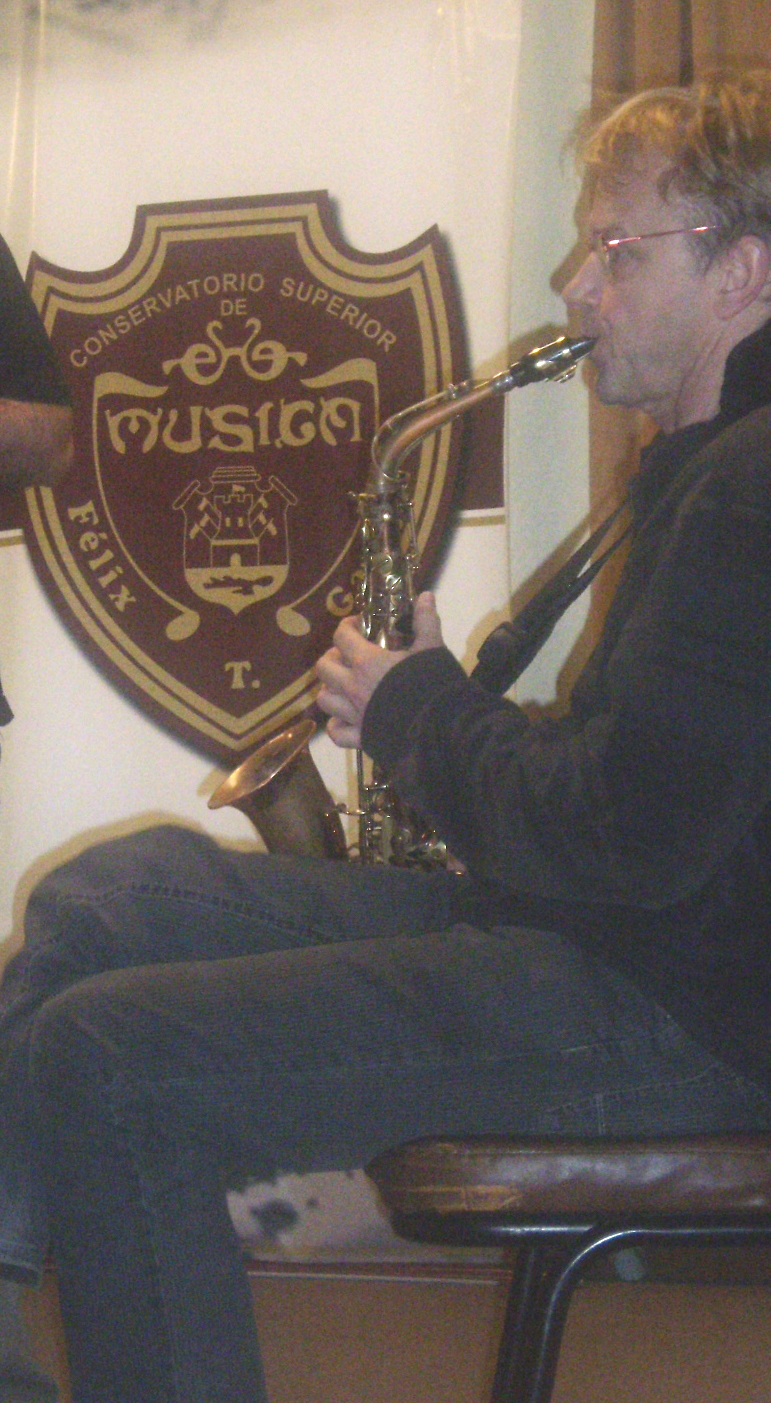
Arno Bornkamp en Córdoba - Argentina - 2010.

Arno Bornkamp (Amsterdam, 1959) is a Dutch classical saxophonist, the professor of the Conservatory of Amsterdam, and is considered an influential soloist in the classical repertoire.

== Biography ==
Arno Bornkamp has won many awards, including the 'Silver Laurel of the Concertgebouw' and the 'Netherlands Music Prize' among the most noteworthy. The latter enabled him to go abroad, studying in France with Daniel Deffayet and Jean-Marie Londeix, and in Japan with Ryo Noda as well as working with composers such as Luciano Berio and Karlheinz Stockhausen.

Since 1982, he has been part of the Aurelia Saxophone Quartet where he plays tenor saxophone with Johan van der Linden on soprano saxophone, Niels Bijl on alto saxophone, and Niels Merwijk William on baritone saxophone.

Among others, he recorded the CD "Adolphe Sax Revisited" with pianist Ivo Janssen, who he has been performing with since 1983. In this cd he used period instruments, which were made by Adolphe Sax.

He has given many masterclasses across the world and has been the professor of saxophone at the Conservatory of Amsterdam since 1995.

== Discography ==
- 1989: Saxophone Sonatas – Arno Bornkamp and Ivo Janssen
- 1993: Reed my mind
- 1995: The Classical Saxophone
- 1996: Hot Sonate - Arno Bornkamp and Ivo Janssen
- 1998: Scaramouche – French saxophone music
- 1998: Arno Bornkamp & Ivo Janssen - Saxophone and Piano
- 2001: Heartbreakers
- 2001: Adolphe sax revisited – Arno Bornkamp and Ivo Janssen
- 2002: Devil's Rag - The Saxophone In 12 Pieces - Arno Bornkamp and Ivo Janssen
- 2005: Metropolis - Berlin 1925-1933 – Arno Bornkamp, Ties Mellema, Ivo Janssen, Ultrech String Quartet
- 2007: Boston to Paris, the Ellisa Hall Collection
- 2008: Buku of horn, Arno B plays Jacob TV
