= Gergely Devich =

Hungarian cellist

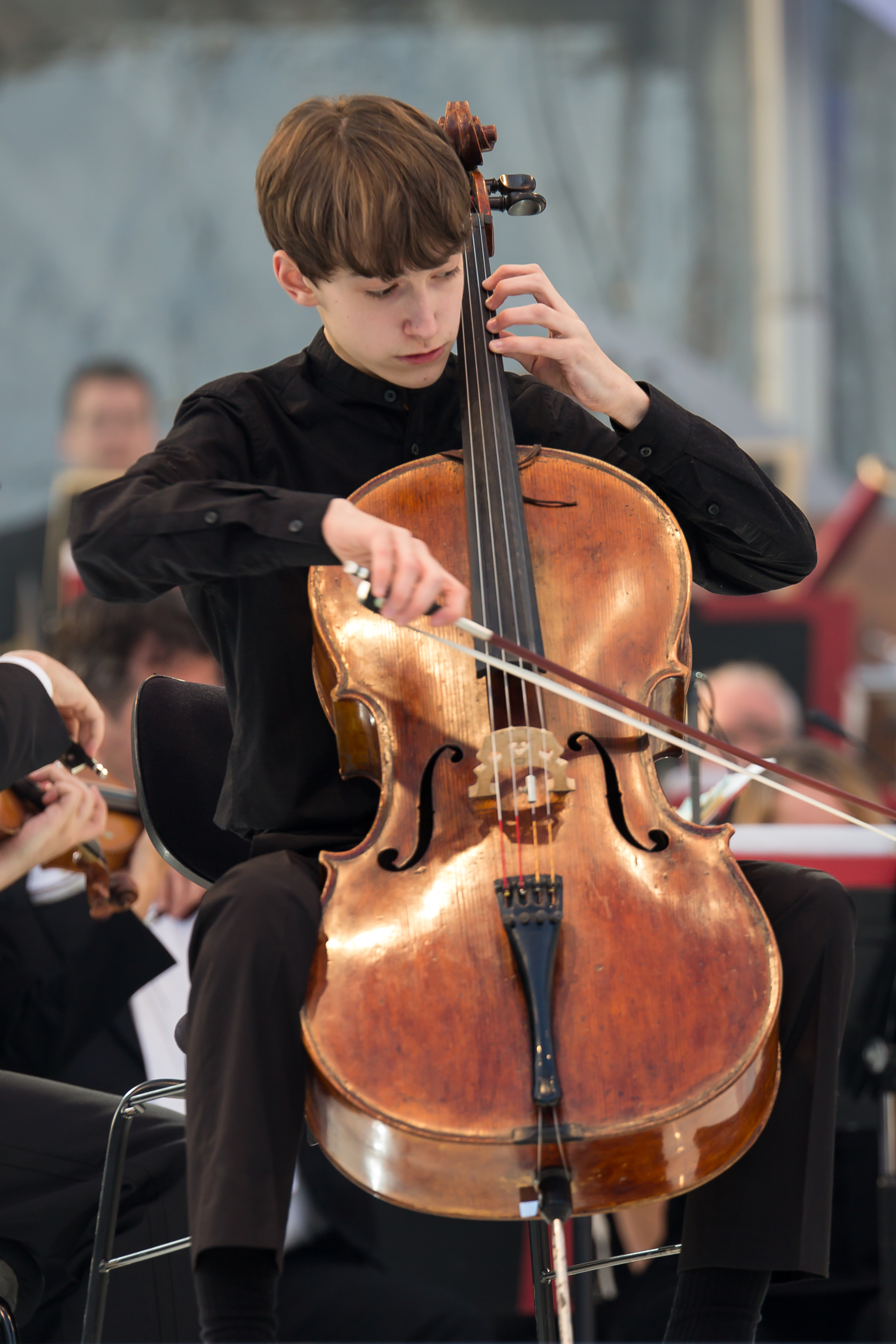
- Gergely Devich at Eurovision Young Musician's 2014

Background information
- Born: June 26, 1998 (age 28); Budapest, Hungary
- Occupation: Musician
- Instrument: Cello
- Years active: 2008–present

Gergely Devich (born 26 June 1998) is a Hungarian cellist. He represented Hungary at Eurovision Young Musicians and received the Junior Prima Award in 2014.

== Early life ==
Gergely Devich was born in 1998 in Budapest, Hungary. His family line also consists of accomplished musicians, with his mother being the Pianist Maria Kovalszki and his paternal grandfather being Cellist Janos Devich, his father, Marton Devich, works in radio. He began playing cello when he was 8 years old.

== Career ==
Gergely's musical skills allowed him to be accepted into the Franz Liszt Academy of Music. He has also won several national and international competitions. In 2014, aged 16 years old, he represented Hungary at Eurovision Young Musicians, winning 3rd place for his performance, the highest place Hungary has gotten in the contest. The following year, Devich released his first album titled (Adagio and Allegro) with his mother.

He graduated from Franz Liszt Academy in 2022, and has since performed with the Korossy Quartet, performing concerts at a national and international level.
