= Or Torah Synagogue =

Synagogue in Acre, Israel

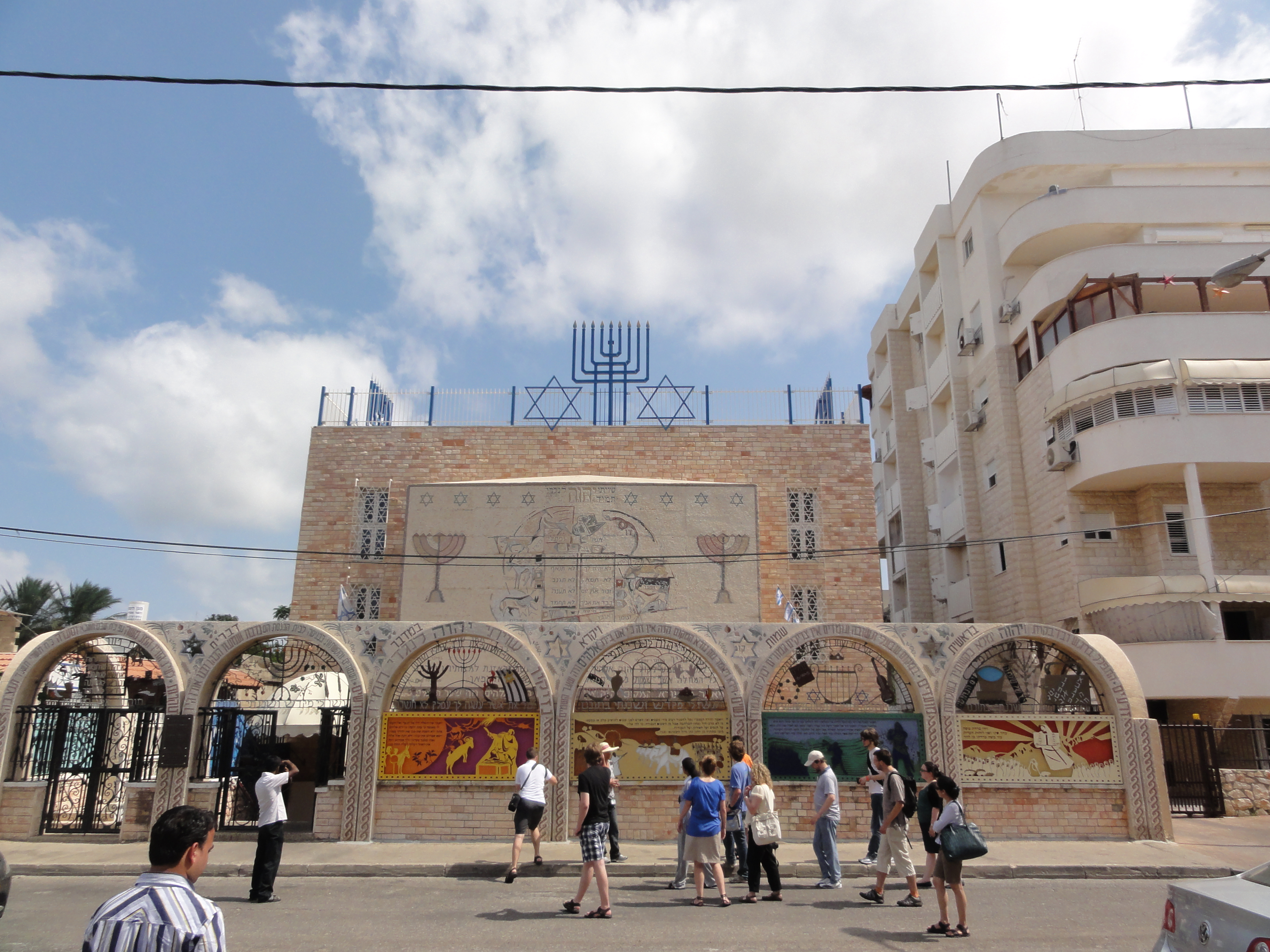
- Entrance to the synagogue, in 2011

- Location of the synagogue in the northwest of the Northern District

Religion
- Affiliation: Judaism
- Ecclesiastical or organizational status: Synagogue
- Status: Active
- Features: Mosaics throughout

Location
- Location: 13 Kaplan Street, Acre, Northern District
- Country: Israel
- Interactive map of Or Torah Synagogue
- Coordinates: 32°55′27″N 35°04′36″E

Architecture
- Type: Synagogue architecture
- Completed: 1955

Specifications
- Dome: One
- Materials: Stones; tiles; glass

The Or Torah Synagogue, sometimes the Ohr Torah Synagogue, also known as the Tunisian Synagogue in Acre, the Djerba Synagogue, and the Jariva, is a Jewish congregation and synagogue, located at 13 Kaplan Street, in Acre, in the Northern District of Israel. The building was completed in 1955 by Jews from Tunisia and took over 54 years for the artwork to be completed.

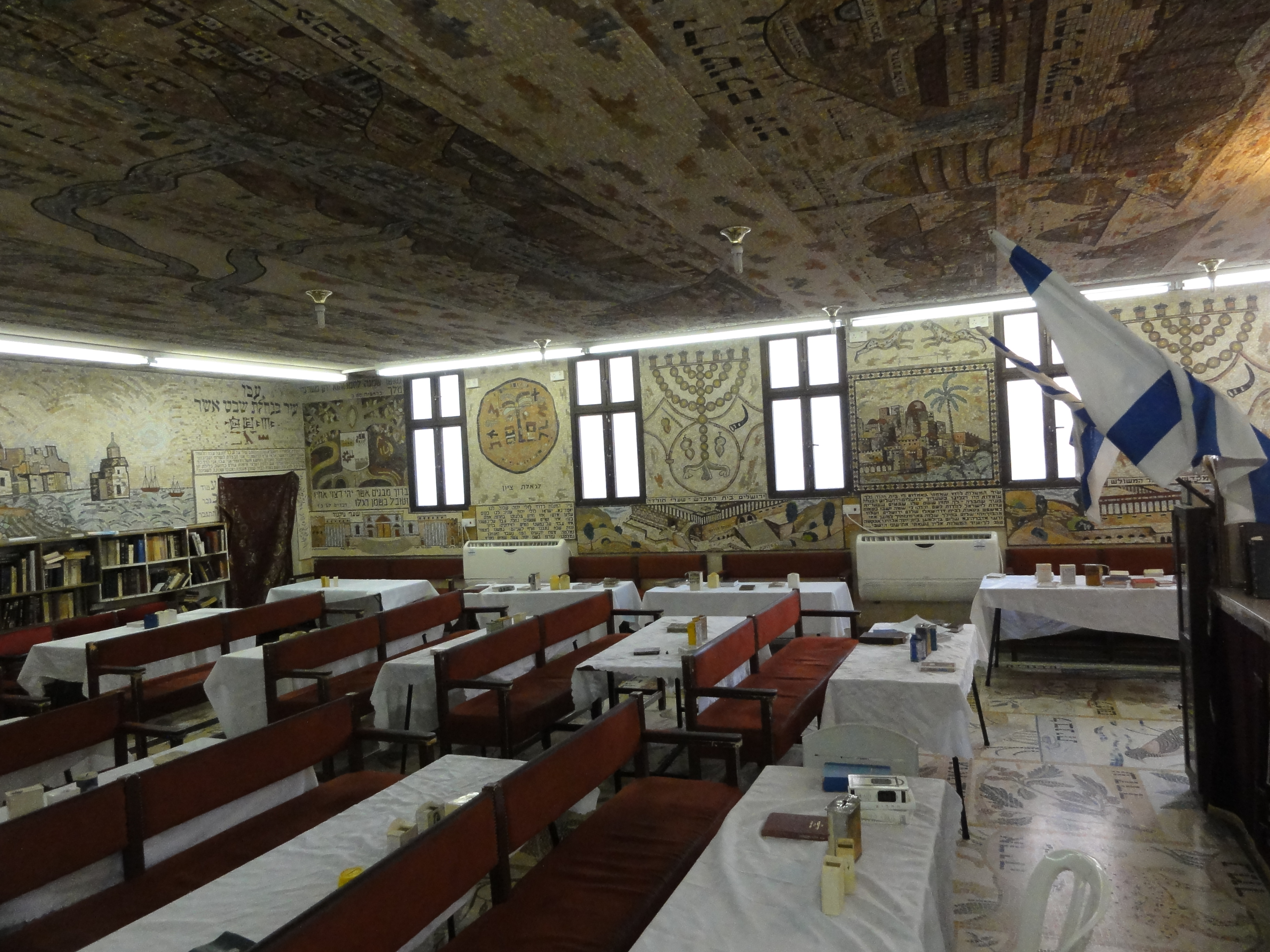
The inside of the synagogue.

The building is unique in its use of millions of natural stones laid as mosaics both inside and outside the synagogue, that were manufactured at Kibbutz Eilon. The building has 140 stained glass windows and a dome. The mosaics and stained-glass windows depict the history of the Jewish people and of the Land of Israel through Bible stories, flora, fauna, Jewish resistance during World War II, and more.

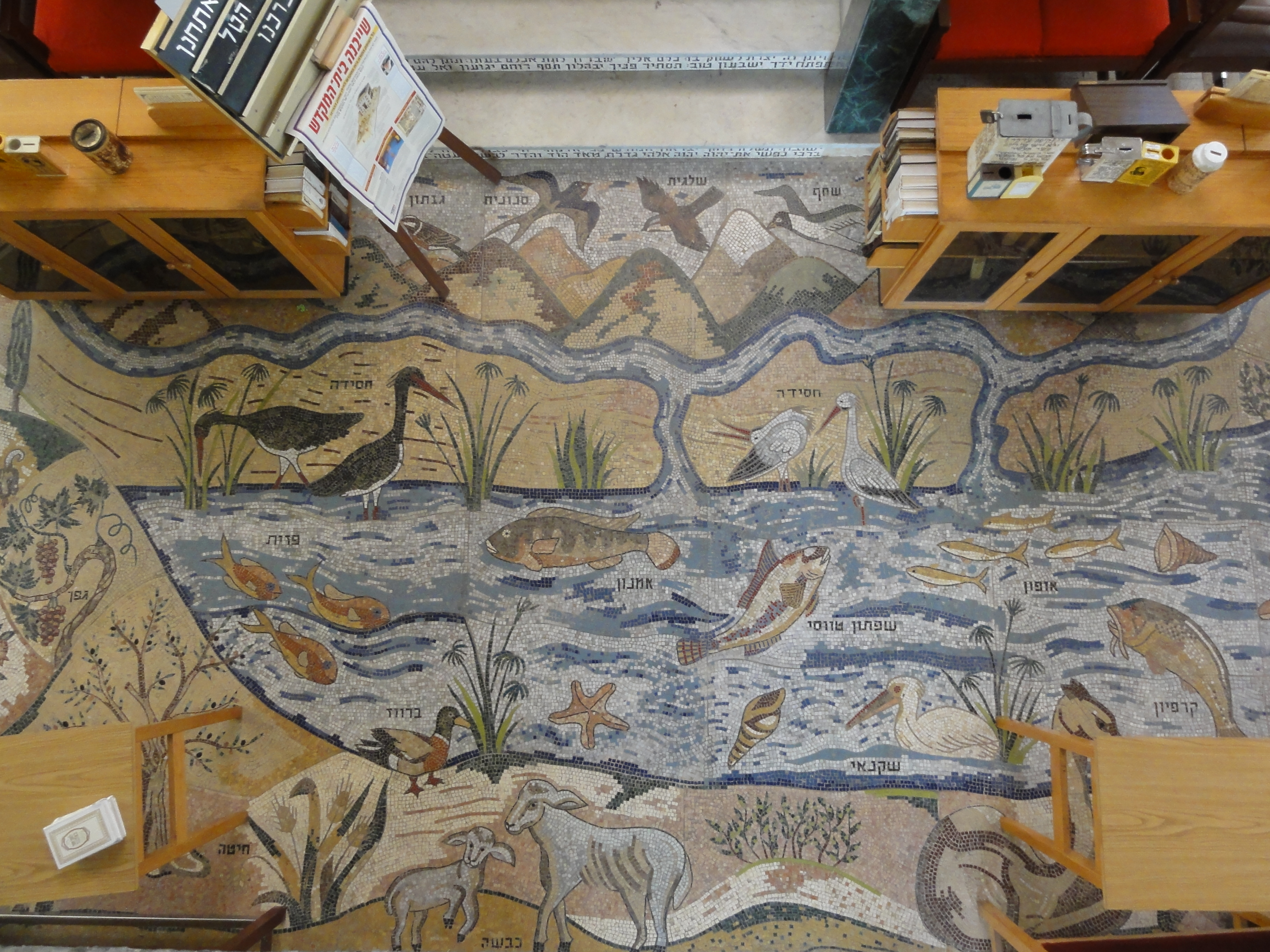
One of many mosaics inside

The synagogue plan is believed to have replicated the El Ghriba synagogue on Djerba, Tunisia.

== See also ==
- Beth Alpha, ancient synagogue with mosaic floor; its zodiac is copued in the dome of the Or Torah Synagogue
- History of the Jews in Israel
- History of the Jews in Tunisia
- List of synagogues in Israel
