= Volodymyr Runchak =

Volodymyr Petrovych Runchak (Ukrainian: Володи́мир Петро́вич Рунча́к) is a Ukrainian accordionist, conductor and composer who was born on June 12, 1960, in Lutsk where in 1979 he attended its music college. In 1984 he was a winner of the Republican Accordion Competition and the same year began studying conducting at the Kiev Conservatory where he also studied composing two years later. In 1988 he joined National Union of Composers of Ukraine and remained there till this day. He has conducted over 100 works which he performed in his native Ukraine, and then went to Kazakhstan and France. Currently he serves as a member of the New Music Association and is a founder of New Music Concert Series.

== Legacy ==
Runchak wrote a numerous works for instruments and vocal. According to «Frankfurter Allgemeine Zeitung» V. Runchak found his personal balance between the stylistic and technological limitations and the new freedom. In his works one can hear the courage of the author’s expression which goes far beyond the limit of belonging to any composer’s school. Often, the avant-garde means are the only means for him.

According to N. Krechko, the composer focuses on complex dissonant language, musical expression, innovative techniques associated with sound, atypical spatial-acoustic and timbre-color means.

Runchak is a bright representative of Ukrainian musical actionism (along with Serhiy Zazhytko, Serhiy Yarunsky, Karmela Tsepkolenko, Lyudmyla Yurina, Ivan Nebesnyy, Danylo Pertsov and Hryhoriy Nemyrovsky). Instrumental theater for V. Runchak is related to M. Kagel's instrumental theater, and, according to researchers, became a means to draw attention to social problems.

== Selected works ==
=== Orchestral ===
- In memoriam for symphony orchestra (1984, 15’)
- Symphony № 1 (Symphony of Weeping) for orchestra (1985, 30’)
- Symphony № 2 for orchestra (1985, 1987 - 29’)
- Symphony № 3 (Credo) for baritone, female speaker and orchestra (1986 – 60’; 1991 – 23’)
- Vladislav Passion, symphony for accordion and orchestra (1988, 31’)
- Portrait of I. Stravinsky for accordion, balalaika and orchestra (2003, 7’)
- Requiem for soprano, tenor and orchestra, based on Latin canonical texts (2004, 33’), (version for chamber ensemble: sopr, ten, fl, cl, pn, 2 vn, vl, vc, (1990, 33’)
- Forte\piano, concerto for symphony orchestra without piano (2008, 13’)
- “Is the flute magic?” Music homage to W.A. Mozart for flute (picc, ord, c-alto) and orchestra, Flute concerto (2017, 20')
- Chamber symphony No 1 (in memory of B. Lyatoshynsky) for strings (1986, 18’)
- Sacred Songs, chamber symphony No 2 for piano trio and strings (1988, 22’)
- Chamber symphony No 3 for flute (picc, ord, alto) and orchestra soloists (1991, 20’) /fl; ob, cl, bsn, hrn, trb, trn, tb, hrp, 2 perc, pn (cemb), 2 vn, vl, vc, db/
- Semper fidelis, chamber symphony No 4 for strings (2011, 16’)
- Concerto for alto saxophone and chamber orchestra (1987, 16’), (version for saxophone and piano)
- 1 + 16 + …, non concerto for violin and strings (1997, 22’)
- “Key” to the treble clef (a small practical experience) for violin and strings (2012, 12’)
- Self-portrait (12.06.18) for accordion and string orchestra (2018, 9’)

=== Chamber ===
- "Homo ludens I-XII@, for instruments solo
- Trumpets of Jericho for 12 (or more) trumpets (2007, 8’)
- (pia)NO TROMB ONE for trombone and piano (2005, 4’)
- Greetings M.K. (Dedicated to M.Kagel) for piano (2001, 10’)
- v.runchak.b(es)_clari@net for clarinet (2003, 6’)
- Anti-sonatas №28, 29 and 53 for piano and clarinet (2003, 16’)

=== Choral ===
- Oh our Lord, prayer for mixed choir (1990, 8’)
- Prayer for female voice and female choir (2011, 7’)
- Glorifying the Birth of Jesus, concert-chant for mixed choir and children’s voices, based on the Gospel by St. Luke (1999, 20’)
- A Sermon on the Mountain, antiphon for mixed choir, based on the Gospel by St. Luke (1998, 10’)
- To the Death of Jesus, ecclesiastical song for female choir, speaker and 2 trumpets in 4 mov, based on the Gospel by St. Luke (1991, 18’), (version for mixed choir ensemble, 12’)
