= Lucie Horsch =

Dutch recorder player (born 1999)

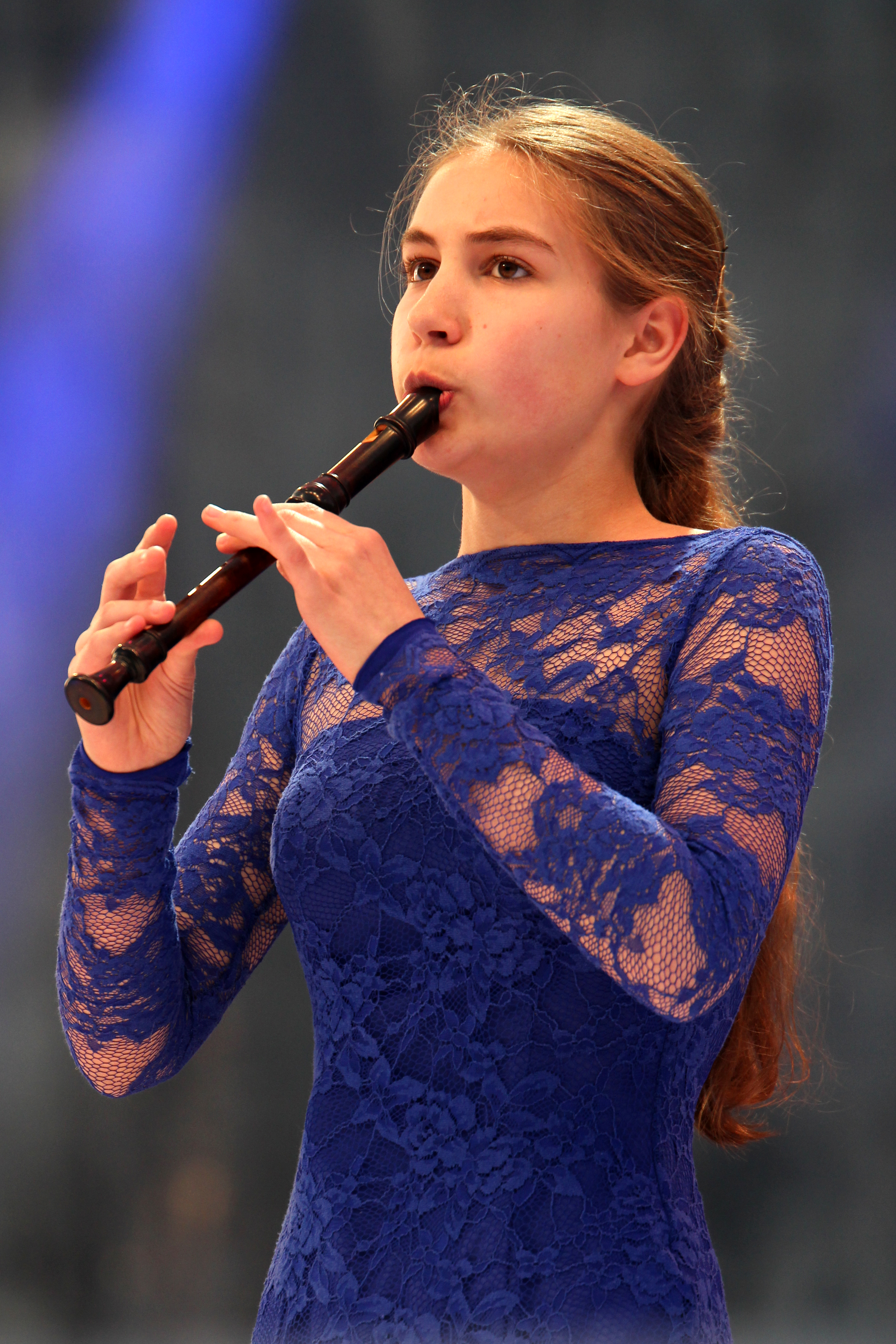
- Lucie Horsch in 2014

Background information
- Born: 1999 (age 25–26); Amsterdam, Netherlands
- Genres: Early music
- Instrument: Recorder
- Labels: Decca Records

Lucie Horsch (born 1999) is a Dutch recorder player.

== Early life ==
Born 1999, Horsch started playing the recorder at the age of five, and received her first national recognition at the age of nine, when her performance at Kinderprinsengrachtconcert was broadcast on national television. She studied recorder with Walter van Hauwe and piano with Marjes Benoist and Jan Wijn at Conservatorium van Amsterdam.

== Career ==
In 2014, Horsch represented the Netherlands in the Eurovision Young Musicians contest, and in 2016 she received the "Young Talent" award from Concertgebouw. She started an international solo career and she has been praised as one of the most talented recorder players of her generation. In 2016, her first recording was published, a collection of Vivaldi recorder concertos that won her the Edison Award. In 2019, her second recording, a collection of baroque concertos with the Academy of Ancient Music, was awarded the Opus Klassik prize. In 2020, she received the Nederlandse Muziekprijs from the Dutch Ministry of Education, Culture and Science.

In 2022, Horsch released a third album, Origins, described as folk-inspired, with music by various composers.
