= Keshet Eilon =

Music center in Eilon, Israel

Coordinates: 33.0637°N 35.2210°E

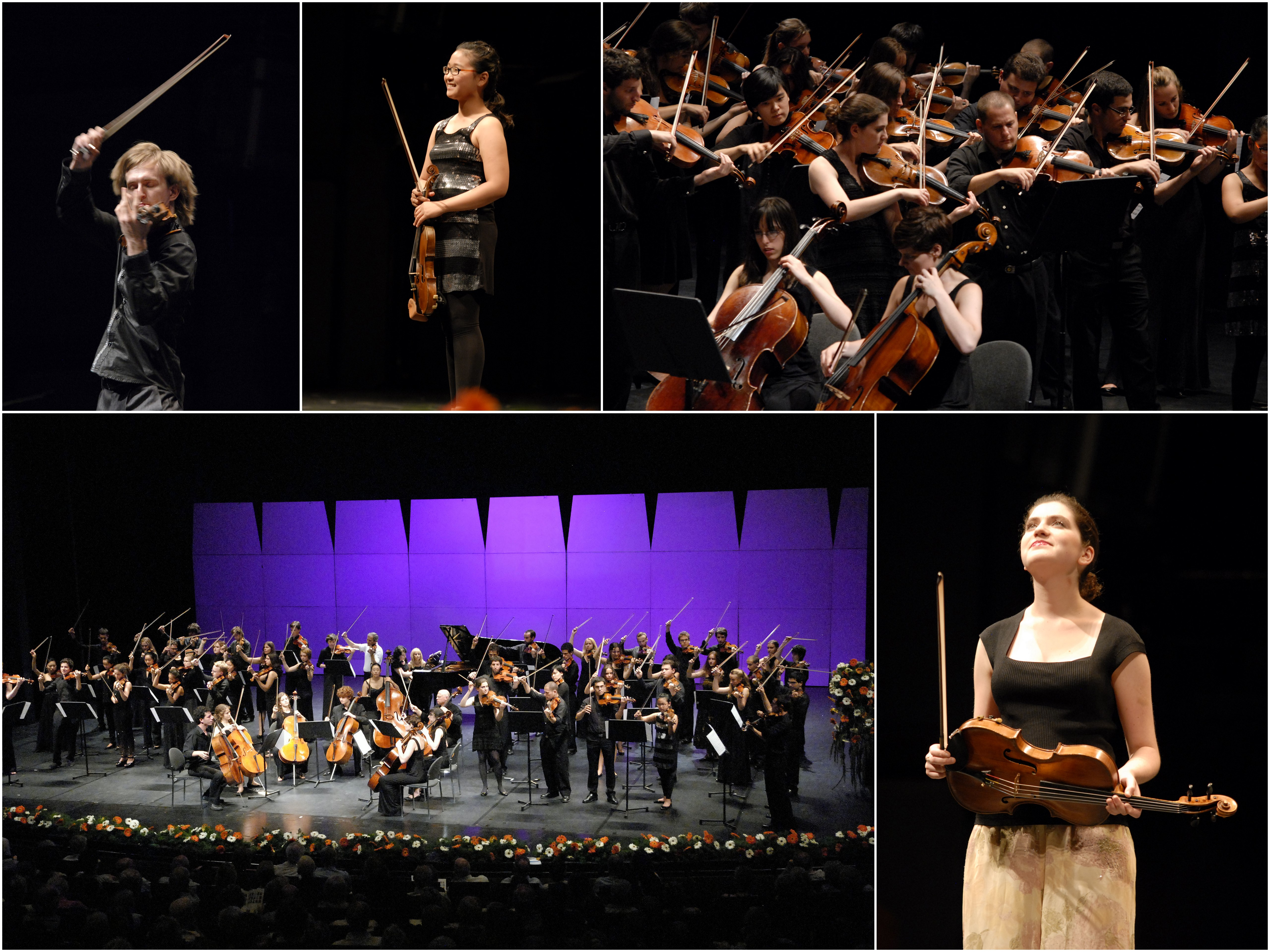
Keshet Eilon summer 2011, Gala Concert in Tel Aviv

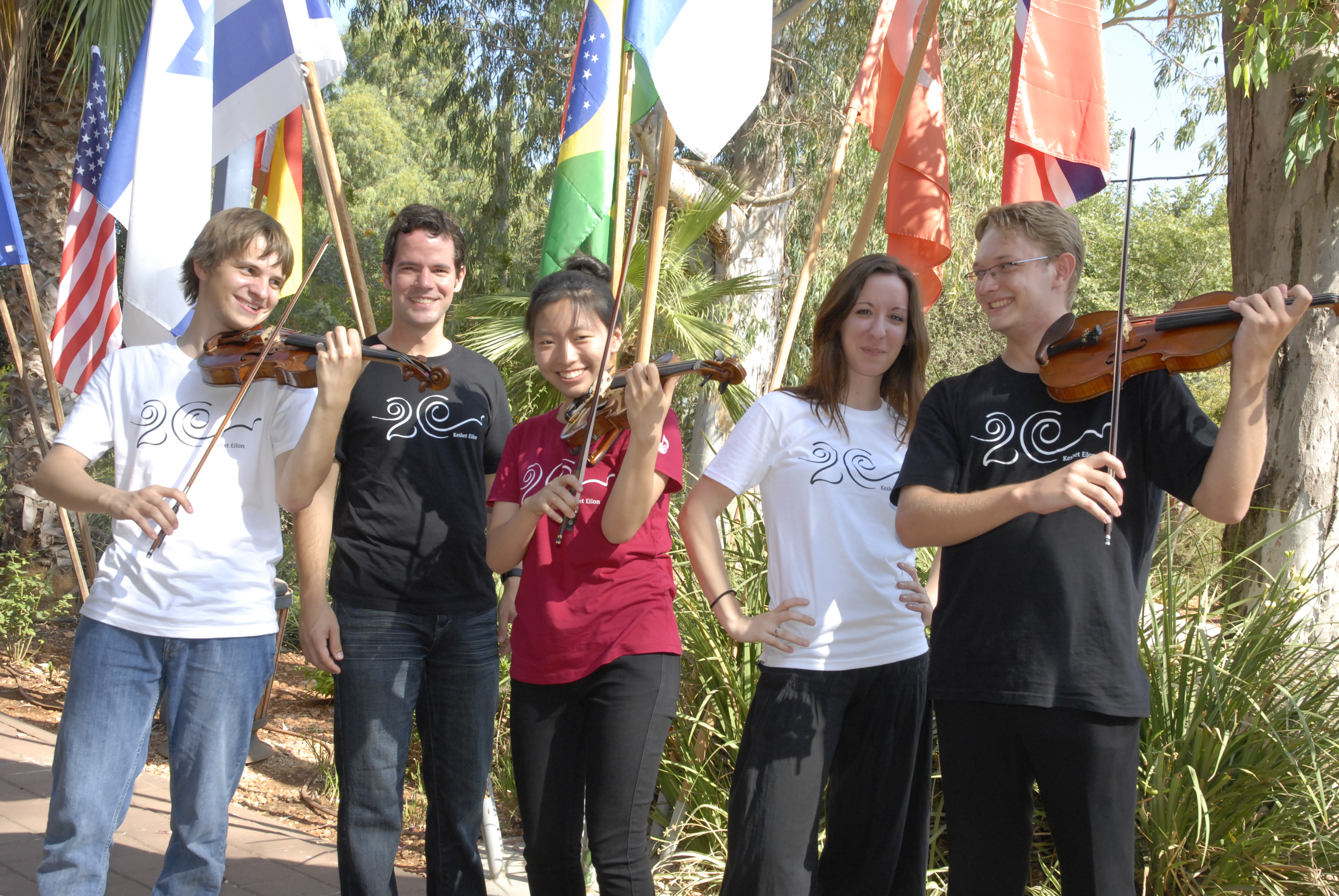
Violin students, participants of 2010 Keshet Eilon summer mastercourse

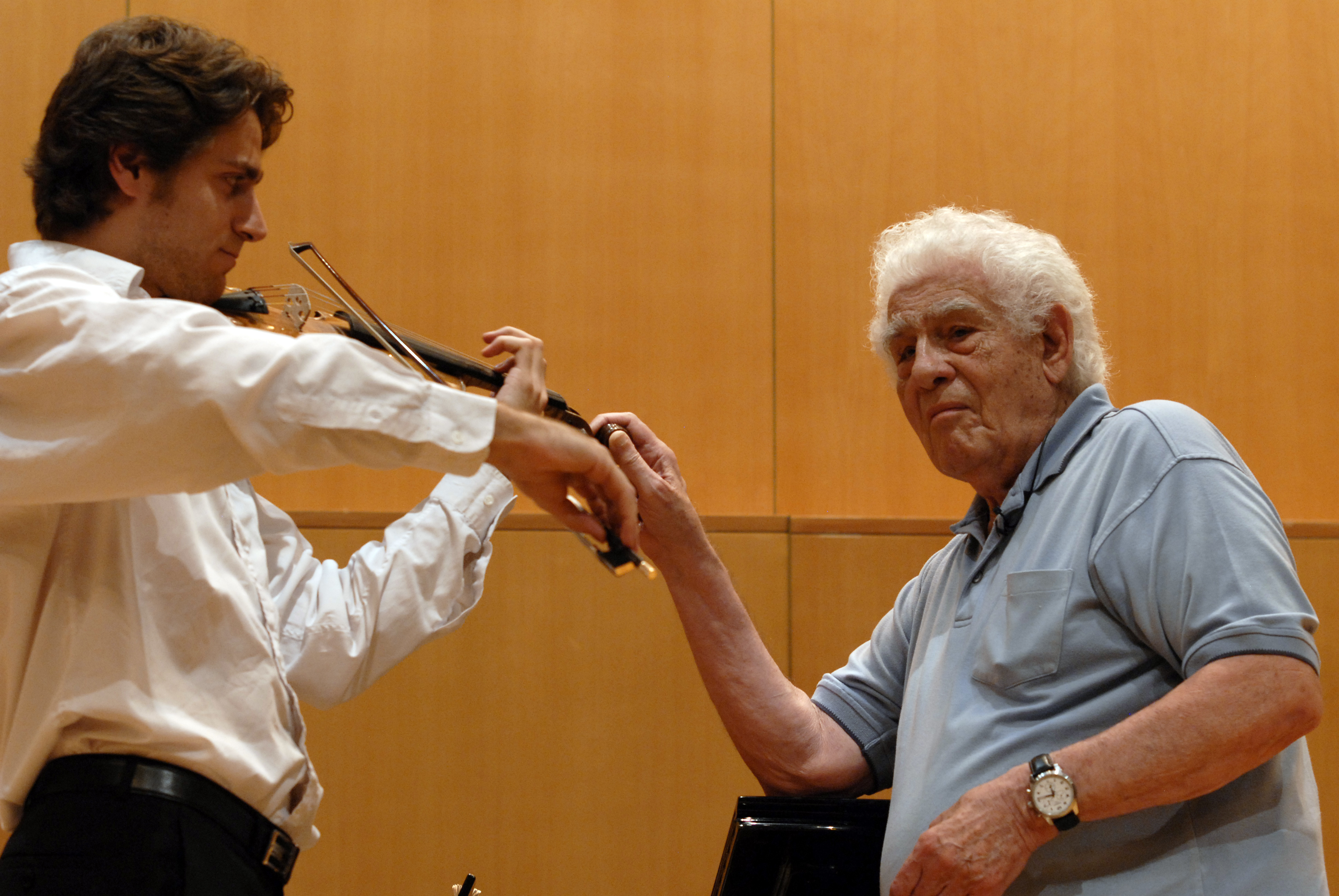
Keshet Eilon Summer 2011masterclass with Haim Taub

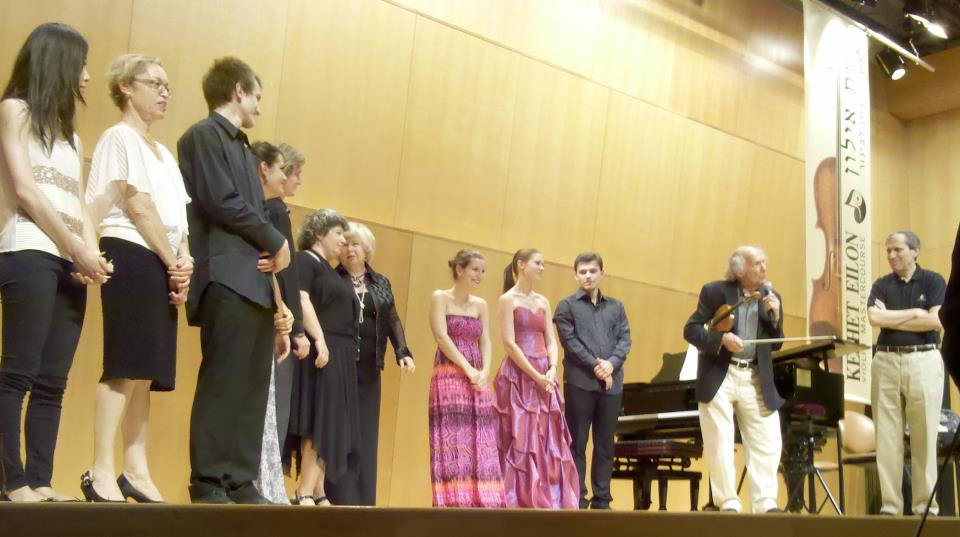
Honorary guest, violinist Ivry Gitlis at a special concert

Keshet Eilon (Hebrew: קשת אילון) is a music center established in the year 1990, located in Kibbutz Eilon, Israel. Its mission is to be a source of strength and support for young gifted violinists. Every summer Keshet Eilon holds a three-week-long international violin seminar. The students come from different countries throughout the world and the participating teachers are prominent violinists and violin teachers.

== Background ==
Keshet Eilon music center and master courses have been established in Eilon in the Western Galilee in the year 1990, to support 12 young violin students, sons and daughters of immigrating families from the former Soviet Union. In the year 1991 the non-profit organization Keshet Eilon was formed, which aims to train and promote young violinists from Israel and throughout the world who are intent on attaining the highest musical level.

=== Activities ===
Keshet Eilon is involved in a variety of activities

Summer seminar and master classes

Every year a three week long international seminar is being held in Kibbutz Eilon, where students attend private lessons and master classes with violin masters Haim Taub, Edward Grach, Itzhak Rashkovsky, Ani Schnarch, Vadim Gluzman and Hagai Shaham, to name just a few. In the evenings they give concerts at the local music hall. During the seminar a violin building workshop operates and students receive training in the art of archery. At the end of the seminar a gala concert is held in Tel Aviv.

Each year about 50 violin students from around the world attend the seminar, accompanied by other string instrument players and pianists. Keshet Eilon alumni live in Israel and in 50 different countries worldwide.

Keshet Eilon Seminars for Israeli Violin students and teachers

Every year since 2002 Keshet Eilon holds seminars for Israeli violin students and teachers. The participants, 7–20 years of age, arrive from all parts of the country. Among them are Arab and Druze violinists. These are intensive events of studies and playing, which last for three days.

A limited number of pupils from abroad are accepted to the Seminars. Instruction in English is available for these pupils.

Concerts and Events

During each year the Keshet Eilon local music hall holds a music series which includes string ensembles, recitals, choirs and folk music.

A Campus for the Keshet Eilon Music Center

A campus of the Keshet Eilon Music Center is about to be built on a 28 dunam (7 acre) plot, allotted by Kibbutz Eilon. This enterprise will offer new employment opportunities, stimulate cultural tourism with year-round roster of music events, and attract new residents all year long. The new music center's urban building scheme has already been authorized and construction is soon to begin.
