= Ani Schnarch =

Romanian musician

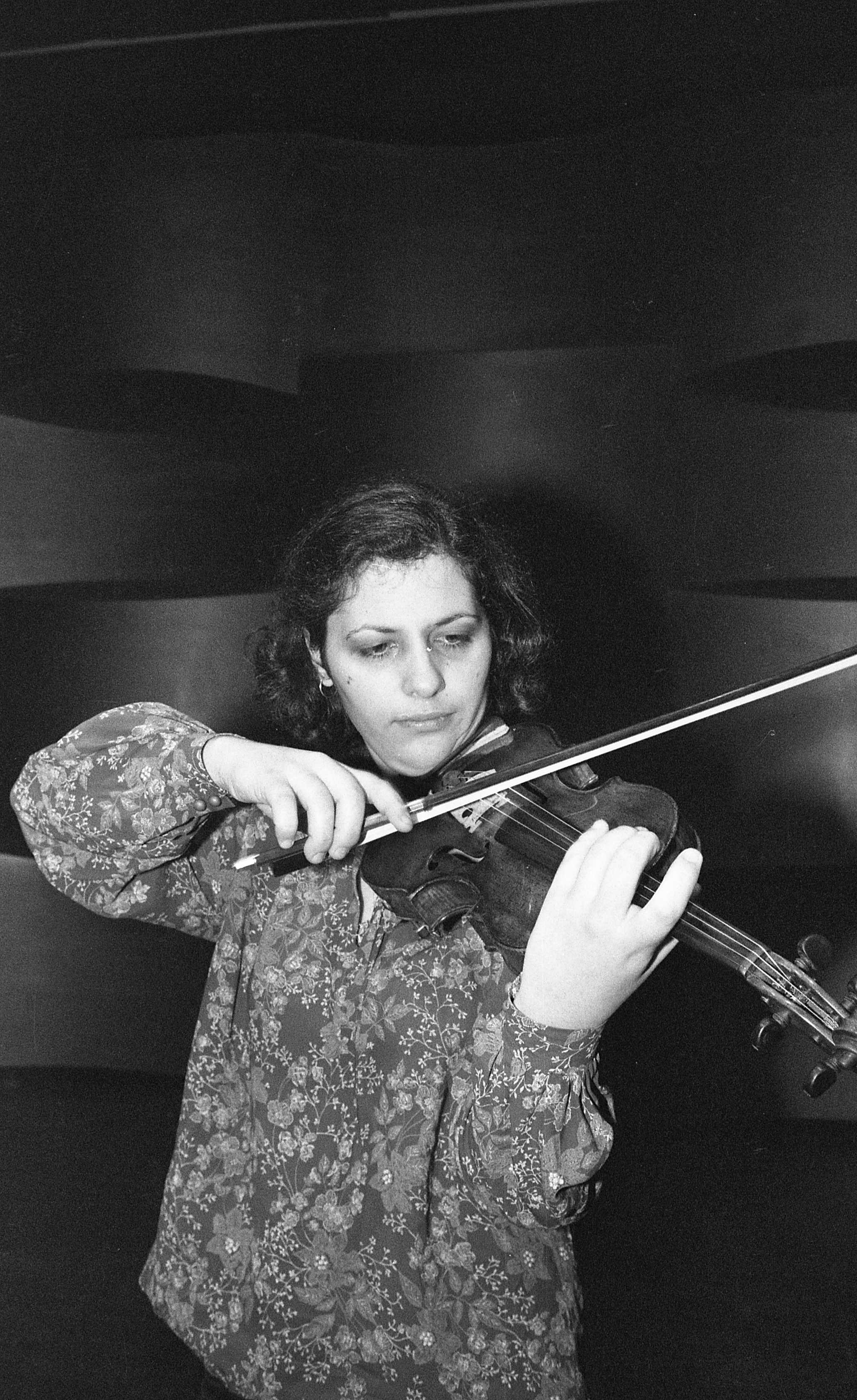
Ani Schnarch, 1981

Ani Schnarch (Hebrew: אני שנארך) is a Romanian-born Israeli-British violinist who currently serves as a teacher at the Royal College of Music, London, and is a winner of both Francois Shapira and Mozart Memorial Prizes.

== Career ==
Schnarch was born in Bucharest. During her early life she used to study with Felix Andrievsky in such music schools as the Tel Aviv University, Samuel Rubin Music Academy and the Royal College of Music. She is known for her performances of Bartok at both Purcell Room and Wigmore Hall respectively. She also appears on public television and Internet in the United Kingdom, the United States, Austria, France, Germany, Norway, native Romania and Israel. Previously she have appeared with such Israeli orchestras as the Israeli Philharmonic, both Jerusalem Symphony and Chamber orchestras as well as Haifa Symphony and Israel Simfonietta. She also performed at the Spanish orchestras such as the Malaga and Seville symphonies as well as London Mozart Players and Oslo Philharmonic. Ani Schnarch has participated at various music festivals such as Bergen, Bowdoin, Lake District, Keshet Eilon and Bath International Music Festival at which she plays on Giovanni Battista Guadagnini's violin from 1745.
