= Novikov =

Novikov, Novikoff (masculine, Russian: Новиков) or Novikova (feminine, Russian: Новикова) is one of the most common Russian surnames. Derived from novik - a teenager on military service who comes from a noble, boyar or cossack family in Russia of 16th-18th centuries. It may refer to:

== Novikov ==
- Alexei Novikov (1916–1986), Soviet pilot and Hero of the Soviet Union
- Alexey Novikov (painter) (b. 1931), Russian painter
- Alexey Novikov-Priboy (1877–1944), Russian writer
- Alexander Novikov (1900–1976), Russian Marshal of Aviation, Double Hero of the Soviet Union
- Alexander Novikov (mathematician), mathematician known for his work on stochastic processes
- Alexander Vasilievich Novikov (b. 1953) (ru) - singer-songwriter
- Anatoliy Novikov (1947–2022), Ukrainian judoka
- Anatoly Novikov (composer) (1896–1984), Russian composer
- Andrey Novikov (1889–1941), Russian writer
- Andriy Novikov (b. 1999), Ukrainian football player
- Arkady Novikov (b. 1962), Russian restaurateur
- Artem Novikov (b. 1987), Kyrgyzstani politician
- Boris Novikov (sportsman) (1909–1989), Russian sportsman and trainer
- Boris Novikov (1925–1997), Soviet actor
- Dennis Novikov (b. 1993), American tennis player
- Dmitry Novikov (b. 1969), Soviet army officer and Hero of the Soviet Union
- Evgeny Novikov (b. 1990), Russian rally driver
- Ignatiy Novikov (1907–?), Soviet statesman
- Igor Novikov (painter) (b. 1961), Swiss-Russian painter Soviet Nonconformist Art, Switzerland
- Igor Novikov (chess player) (b. 1962), Ukrainian then U.S. chess grandmaster
- Igor Alexandrovich Novikov (1929–2007), Russian sportsman and trainer; former biathlon champion
- Igor Dmitriyevich Novikov (b. 1935), Russian theoretical astrophysicist and cosmologist
- Ilya Novikov, (b. 1982), Russian jurist
- Ivan Novikov (1879–?), Russian novelist, playwright, and poet
- Ivan Alexeyevich Novikov (1877–1959), Russian writer
- Ivan Ivanovich Novikov (1916–2014), Russian scientist
- Jevgeni Novikov (b. 1980), Estonian footballer
- Konstantin Novikov (1919–1958), Soviet pilot and Hero of the Soviet Union
- Nikita Novikov (ice hockey) (b. 2003), Russian ice hockey player
- Nikolai Vasilevich Novikov (1903–1989), Soviet ambassador to the United States
- Nikolay Ivanovich Novikov (1744–1818), Russian writer and philanthropist
- Nikolay Vasilyevich Novikov (1880–1957), Russian historian
- Oleg Novikov (b. 1968), general director of Eksmo
- Oleksandr Novikov (b. 1982), Ukrainian politician and law enforcement officer
- Oleksii Novikov (b. 1996), Ukrainian strongman and winner of World's Strongest Man
- Pyotr Novikov (1901–1975), Russian mathematician
- Sergei Novikov (mathematician) (1938–2024), Russian mathematician, son of Pyotr
- Sergei Borisovich Novikov (b. 1961), Soviet footballer
- Sergei Valentinovich Novikov (b. 1979), Belarusian biathlete
- Sergei Novikov (cross-country skier), Russian cross-country skier
- Stepan Novikov, Russian grenadier who saved Surorov from a Turkish warrior in the Battle of Kinburn
- Tanel-Eiko Novikov, Estonian percussionist
- Vasily Loginovich Novikov (1915–1941), Soviet pilot and Hero of the Soviet Union
- Vasily Mikhailovich Novikov (1910–1979), Soviet army officer and Hero of the Soviet Union
- Viktor Novikov (military officer) (1913–1941), Soviet army officer and Hero of the Soviet Union
- Viktor Novikov (footballer) (1912–1970), Soviet footballer and team manager
- Viktor Novikov (1905–1979), Russian Jesuit priest and Catholic bishop
- Vitali Novikov, Russian ice dancer.
- Vladimir Novikov (disambiguation), multiple people
- Vladimir Stepanovich Novikov (b. 1922), Soviet army officer and Hero of the Soviet Union
- Yakov Novikov (also Jacques Novicow) (1849–1912), sociologist
- Yegor Novikov (1915–1941), Soviet pilot and Hero of the Soviet Union
- Yuri Novikov (b. 1972), Kazakh footballer

== Novikoff ==
- Alex Benjamin Novikoff (1913–1987), Russian-born, American biologist
- Ivan Novikoff (1899–2002), Russian-born ballet master
- Laurent Novikoff (1888–1956)
- Olga Novikoff (1840s–1925), Russian author
- Tyrone Novikoff, American football player

== Novikova ==
- Anastasiya Novikova (1980-2004), NTK television announcer in Kazakhstan
- Anastasiya Novikova (footballer) (born 1998), Belarusian footballer
- Elena Novikova (born 1984), Ukrainian road cyclist
- Irina B. Novikova (born 1975), Russian-American physicist
- Ksenia Novikova (born 1980), Russian singer, actress, songwriter
- Olesya Novikova, Russian ballet dancer

== Novakhov ==
- Michael Novakhov, American radio host and New York State Assemblyman

== See also ==
- Arvydas Novikovas (b. 1990), Lithuanian footballer
