= Igor Novikov =

Igor Novikov may refer to:

- Igor Novikov (painter) (born 1961), Russian painter living in Switzerland
- Igor Novikov (pentathlete) (1929–2007), Soviet Olympic modern pentathlete
- Igor Novikov (chess player) (born 1962), Ukrainian then U.S. chess master
- Igor Dmitriyevich Novikov (born 1935), Russian theoretical astrophysicist and cosmologist
