= Petroc Trelawny =

British broadcaster

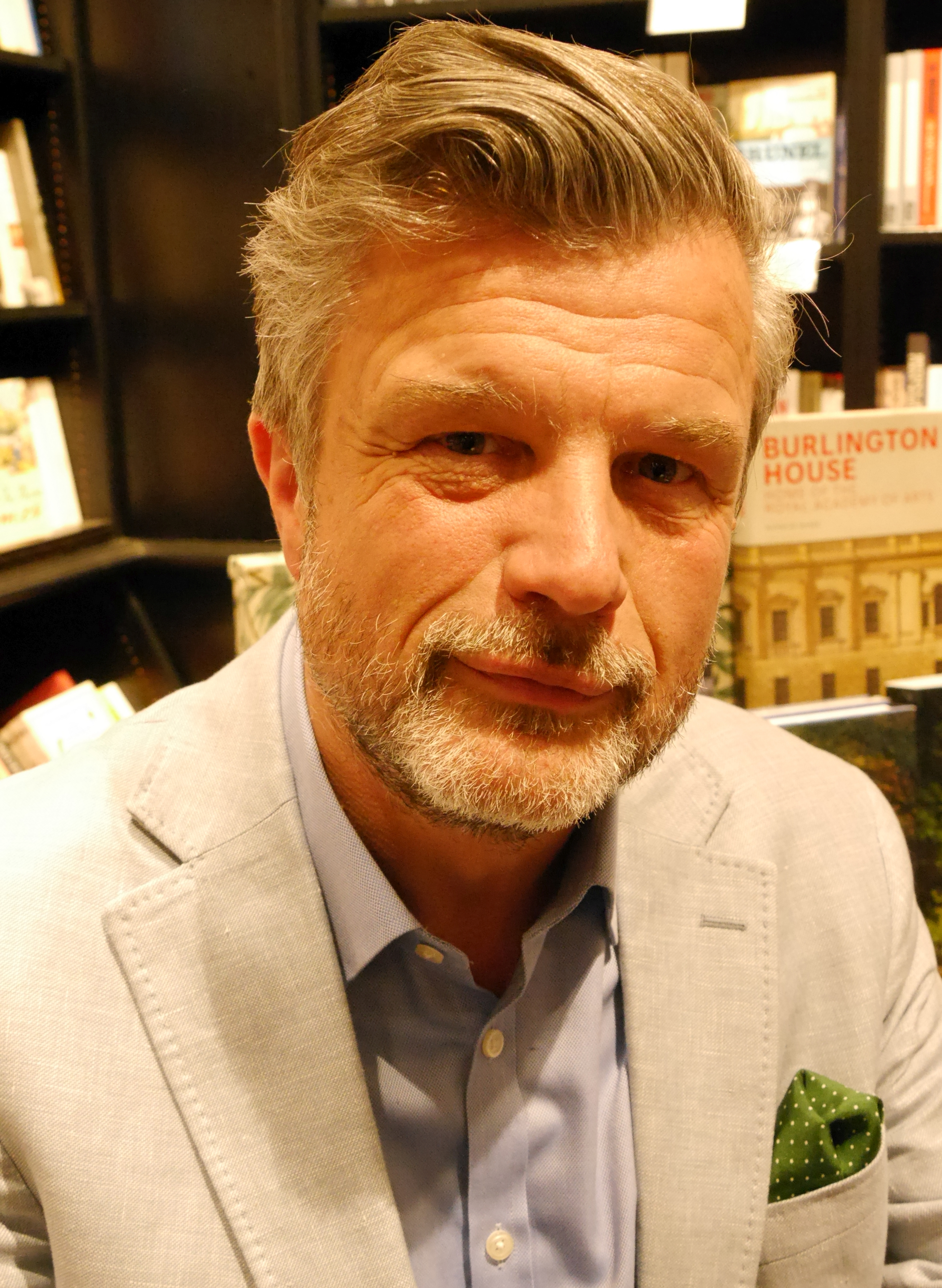
- Trelawny at Hatchards London in 2024
- Born: James Edward Petroc Trelawny; 27 May 1971 (age 55); Worcester, England
- Occupations: Classical music radio and television broadcaster
- Known for: BBC Radio 3 Breakfast

James Edward Petroc Trelawny (born 27 May 1971) is a British classical music radio and television broadcaster. Since 1998 he has been a presenter on BBC Radio 3.

== Career ==
James Edward Petroc Trelawny was born in Worcester and grew up in the Meneage district of the Lizard Peninsula in Cornwall and attended Helston School. He started his career with BBC Radio Devon in 1989, aged 18, as a reporter and presenter. During the First Gulf War, Trelawny was a newsreader for the British Forces Broadcasting Service, and then joined the station as a presenter in Hong Kong for a year.

In 1992 Trelawny joined the new radio station Classic FM, in London, as the first presenter of the afternoon show. In 1994 Trelawny joined London News Radio where he hosted a daily three-hour news and talk show. In 1997 he co-presented the BBC GMR Breakfast Show, broadcast from Manchester, with Victoria Derbyshire.

In 1998 Trelawny joined BBC Radio 3 full-time. Trelawny presented Breakfast, and subsequently In Tune, and has introduced hundreds of broadcasts for the station, many from the BBC Proms, as well as the Cardiff Singer of the World and the Leeds International Piano Competition.

He had also broadcast for RTE Lyric FM in Ireland, where his major documentary series Max and St Magnus – An Orkney Saga won an ESB Media Award. Trelawny is a regular television presenter of classical music programmes for BBC Two, BBC Four and Sky Arts.

As a writer Trelawny has regularly contributed to The Spectator, The Irish Times, The Catholic Herald and BBC Music Magazine. Trelawny is particularly fond of the operas of Britten and Mozart, the symphonies of Shostakovich and Beethoven's piano sonatas. He has also written blogs for the Daily Telegraph and for the BBC Radio 3 website.

In May 2012 Trelawny featured in the international news after being arrested in Zimbabwe while hosting a charity music festival in Bulawayo. He was presenting a concert to raise funds for a children's charity. Immigration officials claimed he was in the country without a work permit. There was widespread international condemnation in the media following his arrest. He was not, in fact, working but giving his services free of charge. Whilst in detention he slipped and injured his shoulder. All charges were later dropped, but the Zimbabwean immigration authorities insisted that he had violated the terms of his entry visa and he was detained until a court sat to decide the outcome. He was released after a few days.

In August 2018, Trelawny hosted the final of Eurovision Young Musicians 2018 at the Usher Hall in Edinburgh alongside Josie D'Arby. On 5 April 2019, it was announced that Trelawny would host the Eurovision Choir of the Year 2019 alongside Swedish culture presenter Ella Petersson at the Partille Arena, in Gothenburg, Sweden on 3 August.

Trelawny has provided the commentary for the BBC broadcast of the Vienna New Year's Concert since 2011. On 12 September 2022 he provided commentary for the address to HM The King of messages of condolence at Westminster Hall.

His first book, Trelawny's Cornwall was published in August 2024. It is in part an autobiographical affirmation of his Cornish roots, and in part an exploration of the people and places that the author sees as distinguishing Cornwall as a nation in its own right.

== Personal life ==
Trelawny is gay. Besides presenting, he writes about LGBTQ+ subjects and has performed in LGBTQ+ works. As of 2025, he lives in Camden, north London.

In 2014, on the news that the Cornish were to be recognised as a national minority, Trelawny wrote in The Daily Telegraph: "Abroad, when I explain where I am from, the inevitable response is: 'So you are English.' 'No,' I reply, 'Cornish.' I'll accept British, or European, but being described as English is something that rankles with most Cornishmen."

== Books ==
- Petroc Trelawny's Classical Music Puzzle Book. Ivy Press, 2025 ISBN 9780711294677
- Trelawny's Cornwall: A Journey through Western Lands. Weidenfeld & Nicolson, 2024 ISBN 9781474625098
