= Stivín =

Stivín (feminine: Stivínová) is a Czech surname. Notable people with the surname include:

- Indi Stivín (born 2001), Czech classical double bassist
- Jiří Stivín (born 1942), Czech flautist and composer

== See also ==
- Stivi
- Marie Majerová, married name Marie Stivínová (1882–1967), writer and translator
