= Josie d'Arby =

Welsh television presenter and actress (born 1972)

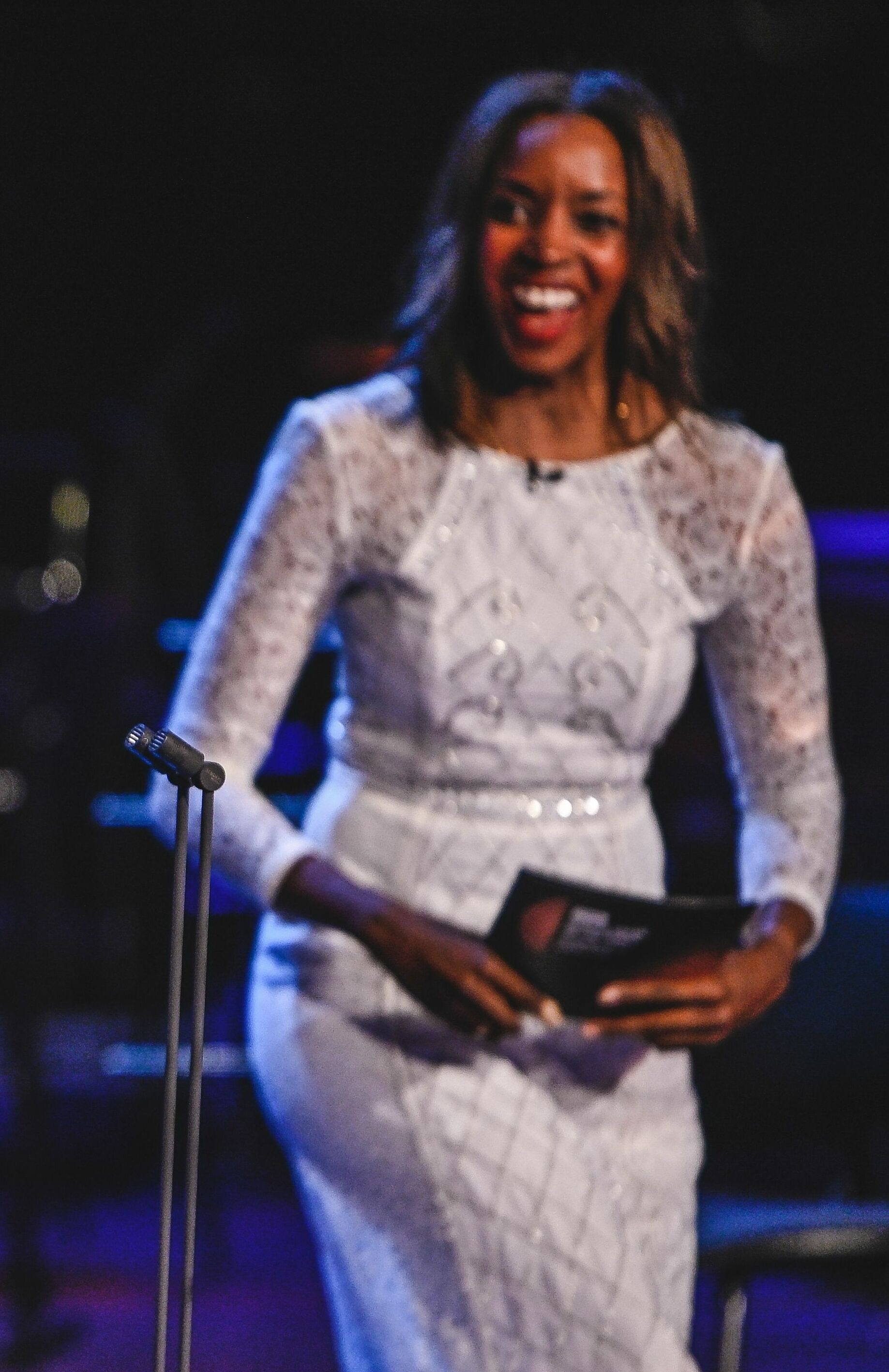
- Born: Josephine d'Arby; Newport, Wales
- Occupations: Television presenter, writer, director, painter
- Website: www.josiedarby.com

Josephine d'Arby is a Welsh television presenter and actress. D'Arby started her television career in children's television co-presenting on SMart progressing to other shows such as Bigger Breakfast and Top of the Pops. She has also acted in Merseybeat and Look Around You.

== Biography ==
Josie d'Arby was born and raised in Newport in Gwent. As a teenager she attended the Anna Scher Theatre in London before winning a place at the Royal Academy of Dramatic Art. She is of Jamaican heritage.

== Career ==
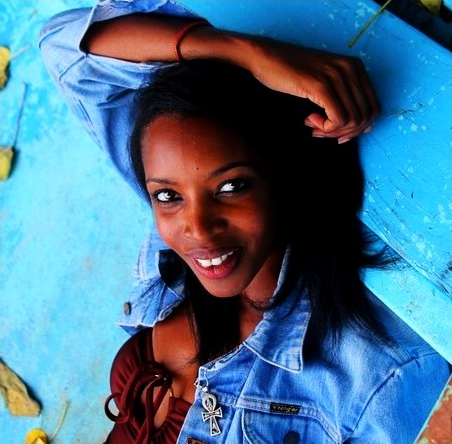
D'Arby in 2010

D'Arby began a presenting career while still a student of acting at RADA. From 1994 to 1997, she presented on CBBC and on SMart from 1996 to 1998, and had her own show, Josie, on Channel 5 in 1999. Programmes she presented include the Bigger Breakfast (a spin-off from The Big Breakfast) and Top of the Pops. More recently she was a presenter for the 2021 BBC Proms, the 2022 BBC Young Musician of the Year, and the 2023 BBC Cardiff Singer of the World.

Her first high-profile dramatic acting role was as series regular WPC Jodie Finn, in the BBC drama Merseybeat. From February 2005, she starred as Peally Maghti, one of the presenters of the BBC's spoof of 1980s science programming Look Around You.

She was one of the six cast members in Channel 4 sketch series Spoons, and has made guest appearances in BBC comedy series Miranda and appears as herself in the Working Title movie Blackball with Vince Vaughan.

She has also worked in radio, as a co-presenter of The Steve Wright Show for BBC Radio 2 and has presented documentaries for BBC Radio 4. She also presented a live edition of The Choir for BBC Radio 3 and in 2017 hosted the BBC Radio 2 Young Choristers of the Year final. In November 2011, she wrote and directed the off-beat New York Comedy A Magpie in the Mirror. The festival arts documentary National Eisteddfod 2017 with Josie d'Arby was broadcast in the summer of 2017 on BBC Four and BBC Two Wales. She regularly presents Proms in the Park.

She has also appeared on the stage. In 2012 she wrote and directed the play, The Newport Monologues, about life in her hometown in September 2012. She produced and directed the arts project Private View, which featured the actor Michael Sheen.

D'Arby won a Royal Television Society award for her work presenting the current affairs programme Inside Out for BBC West.

On 23 August 2018, d'Arby hosted the final of Eurovision Young Musicians 2018 at the Usher Hall in Edinburgh alongside Petroc Trelawny.

== Charity work ==
In Summer 2012, d'Arby was one of eight core walkers who walked 200 miles from South to North Wales in aid of Wales Air Ambulance charity.

She was a celebrity ambassador for the British Red Cross for whom she has travelled to both South Africa and Cambodia and been a guest speaker at their national assembly. She and Cerys Matthews hosted the Children in Need section for Wales. d'Arby often hosts Proms in the Park for BBC Four.

She worked with Survivors Fund (SURF), a charity that supports survivors of the Rwandan genocide of 1994.
