= Eurovision Young Musicians 2018 =

Nineteenth edition of the Eurovision Young Musicians contest

Coordinates: 55.9464°N 3.2069°W

Dates and venues
- Semi-final 1: 18 August 2018
- Semi-final 2: 19 August 2018; Festival Theatre Studio Edinburgh, United Kingdom
- Final: 23 August 2018
- Venue: Usher Hall; Edinburgh, United Kingdom

Organisation
- Organiser: European Broadcasting Union (EBU)
- Executive supervisor: Jon Ola Sand

Production
- Host broadcaster: BBC Scotland (BBC)
- Director: Rhodri Huw
- Executive producer: Paul Bullock
- Musical director: Thomas Dausgaard
- Presenters: Petroc Trelawny; Josie d'Arby (final only)

Participants
- Number of entries: 18
- Number of finalists: 6
- Debuting countries: Albania
- Returning countries: Belgium; Estonia; Greece; Israel; Russia; Spain; United Kingdom
- Non-returning countries: Austria
- Participation map: Finalist countries Countries eliminated in the semi-final Countries that participated in the past but not in 2018

Vote
- Voting system: Each juror awarded a mark from 1–10 to each performer based on specific criteria
- Winning musician: Russia; Ivan Bessonov

Eurovision Young Musicians 2018 was the 19th edition of Eurovision Young Musicians. It consisted of two semi-finals on 18 and 19 August, held at the Festival Theatre Studio, and a final on 23 August 2018, held at the Usher Hall in Edinburgh, United Kingdom. It was organised by the European Broadcasting Union (EBU), the Edinburgh International Festival, and host broadcaster the British Broadcasting Corporation (BBC). It was produced by BBC Cymru Wales for BBC Scotland and BBC Radio 3, and presented by Petroc Trelawny, with Josie d'Arby joining for the final. The BBC Scottish Symphony Orchestra conducted by Thomas Dausgaard accompanied all competing performers. This was the second time the contest was held in the United Kingdom, being the first since the inaugural contest in 1982.

Musicians representing eighteen countries participated in the contest, with Albania making their debut alongside seven returning countries, while Austria decided not to participate for the first time.

The winner was pianist Ivan Bessonov representing Russia, with violinist Nikola Pajanović representing Slovenia placing second. This was Russia's first win in the competition and the first pianist to win since Stanisław Drzewiecki for Poland in 2000.

== Location ==
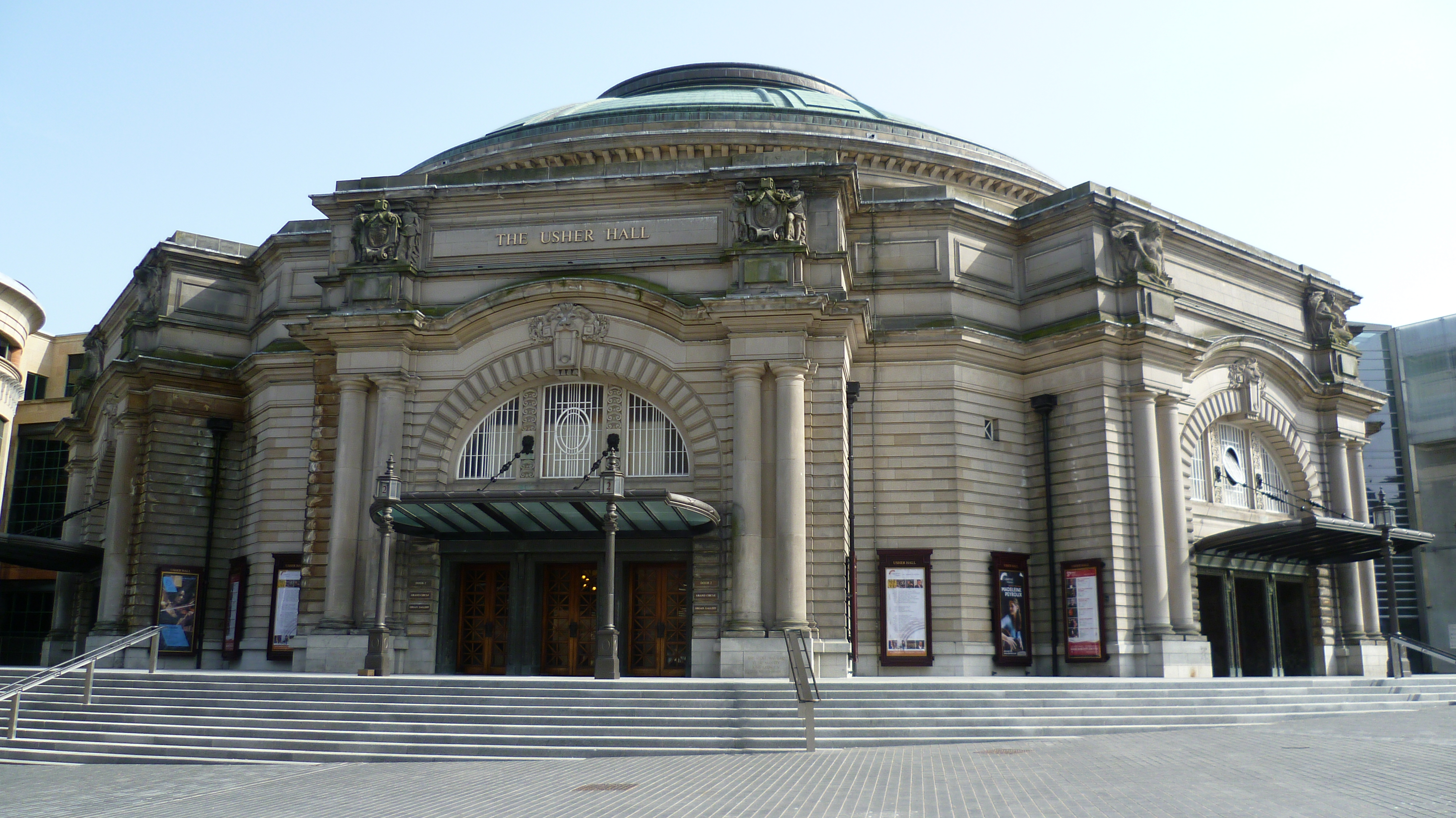
Usher Hall, Edinburgh – host venue of the Eurovision Young Musicians 2018 final.

Usher Hall, the venue for the final, is a concert hall situated on Lothian Road, in the west end of Edinburgh, Scotland. It has hosted concerts and events since its construction in 1914 and can hold approximately 2,900 people in its recently restored auditorium, which is well loved by performers due to its acoustics. The Hall is flanked by The Royal Lyceum Theatre on the right and The Traverse Theatre on the left. Historic Scotland has registered the Hall with Category A listed building status.

The hall previously hosted the Eurovision Song Contest 1972 after Monaco, which won the year before, was unable to provide a suitable venue. The last time the United Kingdom hosted a Eurovision network contest was the Eurovision Dance Contest 2008 in Glasgow.

=== Bidding phase ===
According to an earlier statement by Vladislav Yakovlev, the former executive supervisor of the event, Budapest could host the 2018 contest after bidding for the 2016 edition. On 27 October 2016, the European Broadcasting Union (EBU) launched a call to submit applications for the competition.

=== Host city announcement ===
In early October 2017, Norwegian broadcaster Norwegian Broadcasting Corporation (NRK) confirmed in an online article regarding its national selection Virtuos, that the United Kingdom would host this edition of the contest in August 2018. On 30 October 2017, the EBU announced that this edition of the contest would be held in Edinburgh between 16 and 24 of August 2018.

== Format ==
The semi-final round returned in 2018, produced by BBC Radio 3 in the form of public chamber recitals, at the Studio of the Edinburgh Festival Theatre on 18 and 19 August 2018.

=== Presenters ===
On 6 August 2018, it was announced that Petroc Trelawny and Josie D'Arby would host the 2018 competition. Trelawny’s career started at BBC Radio Devon in 1989 as a reporter, before he made his transition to a career in classical music radio and television during the 1990s. Since 1998 he has been a presenter at BBC Radio 3, and is the face of classical magazine programme Music Matters, Radio 3’s Breakfast and concerts in Radio 3 Live in Concert. D’Arby started on Children's BBC (CBBC) in the 1990s before becoming the youngest woman to have her own chat show, Josie, in 1999 on Channel 5. She has co-presented a number of cultural programs for the BBC including; Young Musician of the Year since 2012, Cardiff Singer of the World since 2009, Songs of Praise since 2014 and Young Choir of the Year (2018). Her acting credits include playing series regular WPC Jodie Finn, in BBC One drama Merseybeat from 2002–04. On 11 August 2018, it was revealed that the semi-finals would be hosted by Trelawny, with D'Arby joining him in the final.

=== Jury members ===
The winner of the competition was decided by an international panel of classical music luminaries. On 10 August 2018, the EBU announced the jurors of the competition. The judges for the semi-finals are British bassoonist Ursula Leveaux, Spanish percussionist Noè Roderigo Gisbert, Korean pianist Sinae Lee, and the chair cellist and conductor David Watkin. Joining Watkin's at the final were American conductor and violinist Marin Alsop, composer and performer Anna Meredith, Scottish classical composer and conductor James MacMillan and Head of Music for the Edinburgh International Festival, Andrew Moore.

=== Voting ===
Altogether there are two set of juries: one for the two days of semi-finals and one for the final. In both juries, each juror was to independently rate each performer a score from 1–10 points. The following criteria were taken into account by the jurors in the semi-finals and finals:

- Technical Accuracy
- Quality of Sound
- Interpretation
- Performance

After each juror has awarded his points, these were added together and the result presented to the jury first. However following discussion, the jury may make changes to the numerical rankings by mutual agreement. The six finalists were announced in a random order after the semi-finals on a separate live stream. In addition, it was announced that the jury in the final would not know the results of the semi-final jury to avoid interference. In the final, only the winner was announced during the televised broadcast.

== Participants and results ==
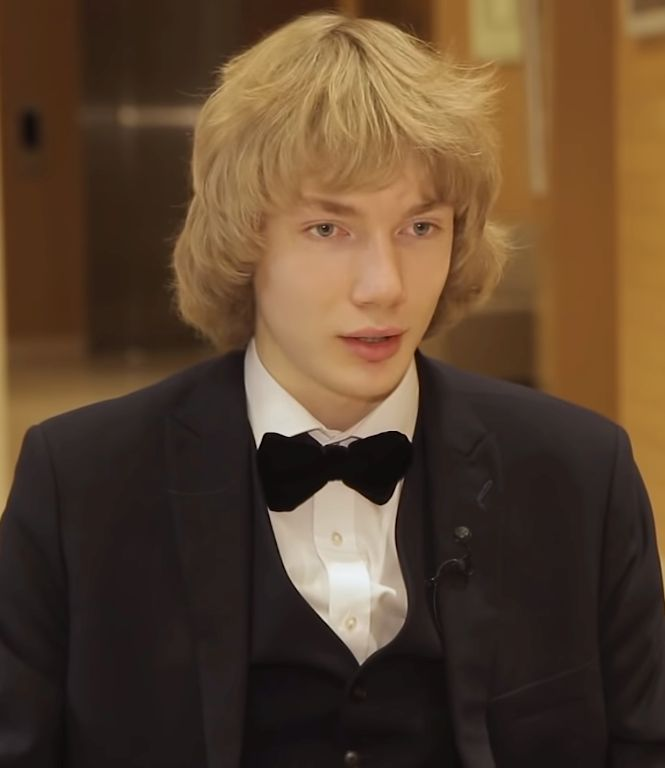
2018 winner, Ivan Bessonov from Russia

The final list of participants were announced on 2 February 2018, with eighteen countries confirming their participation, the highest number since 2006. Albania made their debut whilst seven countries, Belgium, Estonia, Greece, Israel, Russia, Spain and United Kingdom, all returned to Eurovision Young Musicians in 2018. Belgium last participated in 2006, Estonia in 2004, Greece in 2014, Israel in 1986 and Spain in 2000. Russia and host country, the United Kingdom, most recently took part in 2010.

=== Semi-finals ===
The semi-finals consisted of six hour-long shows spread over two days. A total of eighteen countries took part, of which six qualified to the grand final. In each semi-final, three musicians performed, either solo or with piano accompaniment, for a total of 18 minutes each.

==== 18 August ====
Participants and results
R/O	Country	Broadcaster	Performer	Instrument	Piece(s)	R.
Semi-final 1
1	Malta	PBS	Bernice Sammut Attard	Piano	1) Toccata from Trois pièces by Francis Poulenc; 2) Prelude in C minor, Op. 23 No. 7 by Sergei Rachmaninoff; 3) Prelude in G sharp minor, Op. 32 No. 12 by S. Rachmaninoff; 4) Scherzo No. 2 in B flat minor, Op. 31 by Frédéric Chopin	—N/a
2	United Kingdom	BBC	Maxim Calver	Cello	1) Sacher Variation by Witold Lutosławski; 2) Adagio Affettuoso from Cello Sonata in F, Op. 99 by Johannes Brahms; 3) No. 5 Minuetto e Finale from Suite Italienne by Igor Stravinsky	—N/a
3	Spain	RTVE	Sara Valencia	Violin	1) Caprice Basque Op. 24 by Pablo de Sarasate; 2) Caprice No. 13 in B flat major by Niccolò Paganini; 3) 3rd mvt (Finale) of Violin Concerto No. 1 in G minor Op. 24 by Max Bruch	—N/a
Semi-final 2
4	Slovenia	RTVSLO	Nikola Pajanović	Violin	1) Tambourin Chinois by Fritz Kreisler; 2) Capriccio No. 7 by N. Paganini; 3) Sonata for violin solo No. 3 in D minor by Eugène Ysaÿe	Q
5	San Marino	SMRTV	Francesco Stefanelli	Cello	1) Violoncello Totale for cello solo by Krzysztof Penderecki; 2) I mov, Cello Sonata in F major, Op. 99 by J. Brahms; 3) Papillon, Op. 77 by Gabriel Fauré; 4) V mov, Sonata for cello and piano in C, Op. 65 by Benjamin Britten	—N/a
6	Poland	TVP	Marta Chlebicka	Flute	1) Hamburger Sonate in G major by Carl Philipp Emanuel Bach; 2) Rigoletto Fantasie, Op. 335 by Wilhelm Popp	—N/a
Semi-final 3
7	Hungary	MTV	Máté Bencze	Saxophone	1) Fantaisie sur un thème original by Jules Demersseman; 2) Allegro from Sonata in G minor BWV. 1020 by Johann Sebastian Bach; 3) Pequeña Czarda by Pedro Iturralde	Q
8	Greece	ERT	Thanos Tzanetakis	Guitar	1) Fantasia in D minor by David Kellner; 2) 3rd Bagatelle from Five Bagatelles for guitar by William Walton; 3) 5th Bagatelle from Five Bagatelles for guitar by W. Walton; 4) Variaciones sobre un tema de Fernando Sor, Op. 19 by Miguel Llobet	—N/a
9	Israel	IPBC	Tamir Naaman-Pery	Cello	1) Hungarian Rhapsody, Op. 68 by David Popper; 2) Preludio-Fantasia from Suite for Cello by Gaspar Cassadó	—N/a

==== 19 August ====
Participants and results
R/O	Country	Broadcaster	Performer	Instrument	Piece(s)	R.
Semi-final 4
10	Estonia	ERR	Tanel-Eiko Novikov	Percussion	1) Niflheim by Marján Csaba Zoltán; 2) Kuusi Op 75/5 by Jean Sibelius; 3) Verano porteño by Astor Piazzolla	—N/a
11	Belgium	RTBF	Alexandra Cooreman	Violin	1) Presto from Sonata for piano and violin Op 23 by Ludwig van Beethoven; 2) Valse-Scherzo by Pyotr Ilyich Tchaikovsky	—N/a
12	Albania	RTSH	Klaudio Zoto	Cello	1) Cello Sonata by Edvard Grieg; 2) Hungarian Rhapsody by Popper	—N/a
Semi-final 5
13	Russia	VGTRK	Ivan Bessonov	Piano	1) Mazurka in B flat minor, Op 24 No 4 by Chopin; 2) Fantaisie-Impromptu in C sharp minor, Op 66 by Chopin; 3) Prelude in G minor, Op 23 No 5 by Rachmaninov; 4) Barncleupédie by James MacMillan	Q
14	Germany	WDR	Mira Foron	Violin	1) Cadenza for solo viola by Penderecki; 2) Tzigane by Maurice Ravel	Q
15	Czech Republic	ČT	Indi Stivín	Double bass	1) Bohemian Suite, 1st Movement: "Celts" by I. Stivin; 2) Bohemian Suite, 2nd mvt: "Czech Country" by I. Stivin; 3) Bohemian Suite, 3rd mvt: Tarantella Praga by I. Stivin	Q
Semi-final 6
16	Sweden	SVT	Johanna Ander Ljung	Harp	1) Improvisations for Harp, Op 10 by William Mathias; 2) Allemande from Suite No 5 in F by John Loeillet; 3) Féerie - Prelude et Dance by Marcel Tournier	—N/a
17	Norway	NRK	Birgitta Elisa Oftestad	Cello	1) 1st mvt from Cello Concerto No 1 by Dmitri Shostakovich; 2) Adagio and Allegro by Robert Schumann	Q
18	Croatia	HRT	Jan Tominić	Saxophone	1) Fantaisie sur un thème original by Demersseman; 2) Cinq danses exotiques by Jean Françaix; 3) Aria by Eugène Bozza; 4) Brasileira from Scaramouche by Darius Milhaud	—N/a

=== Final ===
Six contestants were selected by the first jury to progress to the Final and the second decided the winner of Eurovision Young Musicians 2018. Each finalist performed one or more movements of a single musical work, accompanied by the BBC Scottish Symphony Orchestra, for up to 12 minutes. During the live shows interval, the orchestra performed "Hedwig's Theme" from the Harry Potter score although this was not included in the televised broadcast. The winner received a custom-made engraved trophy, a cash prize of €7,000, and a performance opportunity with the BBC Scottish Symphony Orchestra in a forthcoming season. The runner-up received a cash prize of €3,000.

Participants and results
R/O	Country	Performer	Instrument	Piece(s)	Composer	Pl.
1	Norway	Birgitta Elisa Oftestad	Cello	Cello Concerto, 4th mov.	Edward Elgar	
2	Slovenia	Nikola Pajanović	Violin	Violin Concerto, 3rd mov.	Pyotr Ilyich Tchaikovsky	2
3	Czech Republic	Indi Stivín	Double bass	Bohemian Suite for Double Bass, 2nd and 3rd mov.	Indi Stivín	
4	Germany	Mira Foron	Violin	Violin Concerto, 3rd mov.	Jean Sibelius	
5	Hungary	Máté Bencze	Saxophone	Saxophone Concerto da Camera	Jacques Ibert	
6	Russia	Ivan Bessonov	Piano	Piano Concerto No. 1, 3rd mov.	Pyotr Ilyich Tchaikovsky	1

== Broadcasting ==
The broadcasters in the following countries, listed in order of broadcasting dates, confirmed that they would broadcast the contest in their territories along with the dates of broadcasting schedules. The broadcasters in Belgium, Czech Republic, Estonia, Greece, Poland, San Marino, Slovenia, Spain, and the UK also livestreamed the contest on their online platforms. The semi-finals and the final were broadcast live on the internet via the official YouTube channel of the competition.

=== Semi-finals ===
Date of broadcast	Country	Station
18 August 2018	Malta	TVM2 (semi-final 1)
18 August 2018	Israel	KAN Kol Ha Musica (semi-final 3)
18–19 August 2018
18–19 August 2018	Belgium	La Trois (semi-final 4)
18–19 August 2018	Estonia	Klassikaraadio
18–19 August 2018	Rest of the world	YouTube
18–19 August 2018	United Kingdom	BBC Radio 3
19 August 2018	Spain	La 2 (semi-final 1)
20–21 August 2018	Russia	Russia-K
21–22 August 2018	Spain	Radio Clásica
22–23 August 2018	Estonia	ETV2
23 August 2018	Czech Republic	ČT art (semi-final 5)
23 August 2018	Hungary	M5 (semi-final 3)
23 August 2018	Norway	NRK2 (semi-final 6)

=== Final ===
Date of broadcast	Country	Station	Commentators
23 August 2018
23 August 2018	Albania	RTSH 1	Unknown
23 August 2018	Belgium	La Trois	Camille De Rijck
23 August 2018	Croatia	HRT 3	Jana Haluza
23 August 2018	Czech Republic	ČT art	Jiří Vejvoda
23 August 2018	Estonia	Klassikaraadio	No commentary
23 August 2018	Estonia	ETV1	No commentary
23 August 2018	Greece	ERT2	Mihalis Messinis
23 August 2018	Hungary	M5	Ádám Bősze
23 August 2018	Malta	TVM2	No commentary
23 August 2018	Norway	NRK2	Arild Erikstad
23 August 2018	Norway	NRK Klassisk	Arild Erikstad
23 August 2018	Poland	TVP Kultura	Aleksander Laskowski
23 August 2018	Rest of the world	YouTube	No commentary
23 August 2018	Russia	Russia-K	Unknown
23 August 2018	San Marino	SMRTV	Unknown
23 August 2018	Slovenia	TV Slovenija 1	Andrej Hofer
23 August 2018	Spain	Radio Clásica	Silvia Pérez Arroyo and Fernando Blázquez
23 August 2018	United Kingdom	BBC Two Scotland (Note: The final was broadcast on a 30-minute delay.)	No commentary
23 August 2018	United Kingdom	BBC Red Button	No commentary
24 August 2018	United Kingdom	BBC Radio 3	No commentary
25 August 2018	Sweden	SVT2	No commentary
2 September 2018	Germany	WDR Fernsehen	Unknown
10 September 2018	Israel	KAN Chinukhit	Unknown
10 September 2018	Israel	KAN 11	Unknown
29 September 2018	Spain	La 2 (Note: The finals would have been aired live on La 2 if Spain had qualified for the final.)	Juan Antonio Simarro

== Other countries ==
For a broadcaster to be eligible to participate in Eurovision Young Musicians, it needs to be an active member of the European Broadcasting Union (EBU). It is unknown whether the EBU issue invitations of participation to all 56 active members like they do for the Eurovision Song Contest and Junior Eurovision Song Contest. The EBU Active Members listed below have made the following announcements in regards to their decisions.

=== Active EBU Members ===
- Austria – On 29 October 2017, Österreichischer Rundfunk (ORF) announced that they were discussing whether they will participate in Eurovision Young Musicians 2018. They decided to withdraw from the 2018 edition, after participating at every previous edition of the contest, with no reasons for their withdrawal being published.
- Bosnia and Herzegovina – On 24 October 2017, BHRT confirmed that due to financial difficulties it would not return to the contest in 2018. Bosnia and Herzegovina's last, and only, participation was in 2012.
- Cyprus – On 2 January 2018, Cyprus Broadcasting Corporation (CyBC) confirmed that due to financial difficulties it would not return to the contest in 2018. Cyprus last participated in 2010.
- Denmark – On 3 January 2018, Danish Broadcasting Corporation (DR) confirmed that it would not return to the contest in 2018 and are unlikely to participate in the competition in the coming years. Denmark last participated in 2002.
- Finland – On 12 January 2018, Yleisradio (YLE) confirmed that it would not return to the contest in 2018. Finland last participated in 2008.
- Ireland – On 28 October 2017, Raidió Teilifís Éireann (RTÉ) announced that it would not return to the contest in 2018. Ireland last participated in 2000. However, the Irish-language broadcaster, TG4, which was eligible to participate representing Ireland, had not released any statements regarding a return to the contest. Ireland was not on the final list of participants released by the EBU.
- Latvia – On 4 November 2017, Latvijas Televīzija (LTV) confirmed that it would not return to the contest in 2018. Latvia last participated in 2002.
- Netherlands – On 30 January 2018, Omroep NTR (NTR) confirmed that it would not return to the contest in 2018. The Netherlands last participated in 2014.
- Switzerland – On 11 November 2017, Schweizer Radio und Fernsehen (SRF) confirmed that SRG SSR would not return to the contest in 2018. Switzerland last participated in 2006.
- Ukraine – On 5 January 2018, National Public Broadcasting Company of Ukraine (UA:PBC) announced that it was considering a return to the contest in 2018. However, on 14 January 2018, UA:PBC confirmed that it would not return to the contest in 2018. Ukraine last participated in 2012.

== See also ==
- Junior Eurovision Song Contest 2018
- Eurovision Song Contest 2018
