= Ivan Bessonov =

Russian pianist and composer (born 2002)

Ivan Bessonov Иван Бессонов
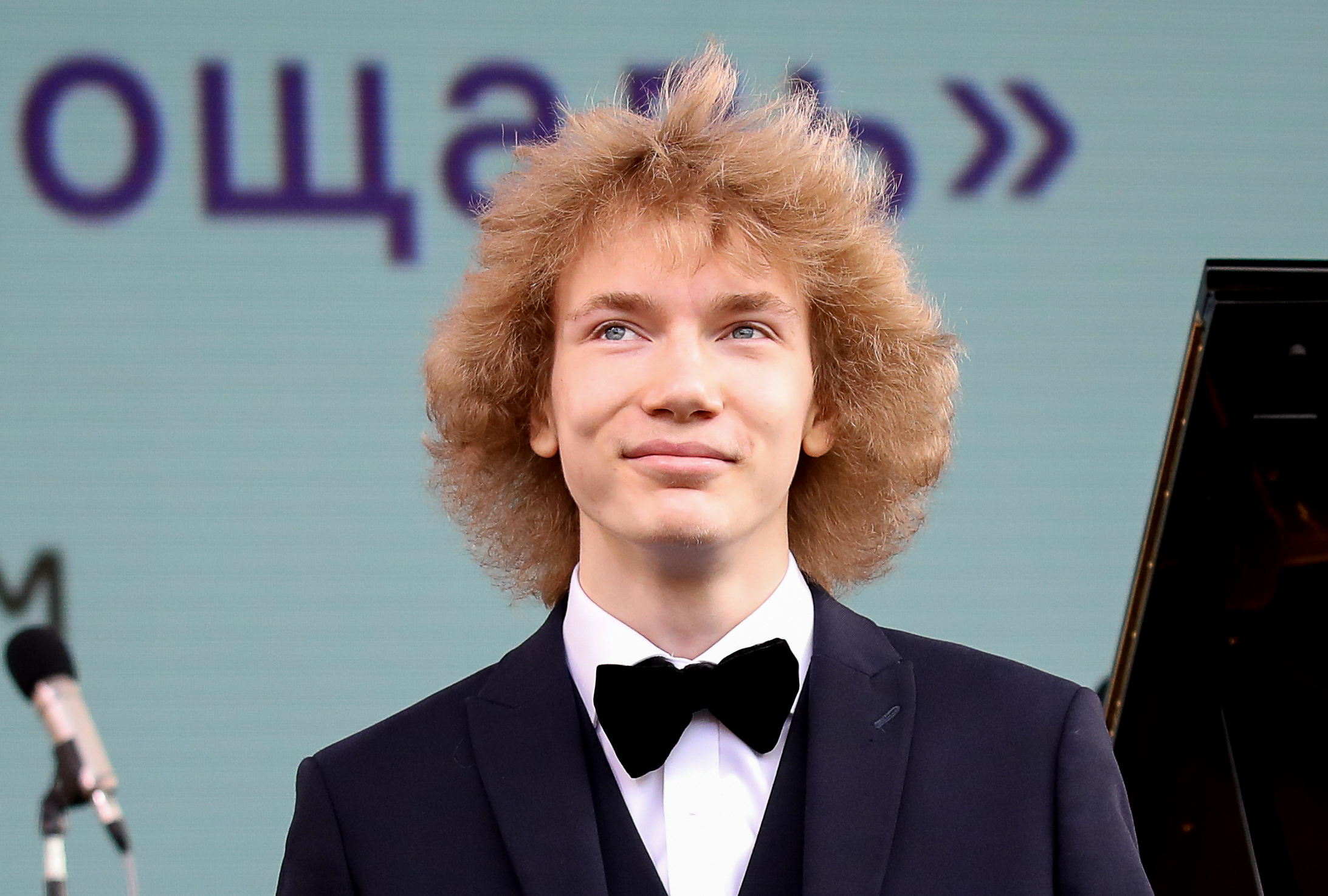
- Bessonov in June 2019

Background information
- Born: Ivan Alekseevich Bessonov; 24 July 2002 (age 23); Saint Petersburg, Russia
- Education: Central Musical School
- Genres: Classical
- Occupation: Classical pianist
- Instrument: Piano

Ivan Alekseevich Bessonov (Russian: Ива́н Алексе́евич Бессо́нов; born 24 July 2002, Saint Petersburg, Russia) is a Russian pianist and composer, winner of the Eurovision Young Musicians 2018.

He composes music and made his film debut as a composer in 2015. He gives solo concerts in Russia and abroad (Austria, Germany, Italy, etc.) and collaborates with world famous conductors, including Valery Gergiev, Vladimir Spivakov, Alexander Sladkovsky.

In 2019, he was the spokesperson of the Russian jury's voting at the Eurovision Song Contest 2019.

In 2022, Bessonov won the First Prize in the first edition of the S. V. Rachmaninoff Competition in the Piano category.

== Personal life ==
Ivan Bessonov was born in Saint Petersburg. His mother, Maria Bessonova, is a violinist. And his father, Alexey Grigoriev, is a composer and sound engineer.

In 2021 Bessonov entered the Moscow Conservatory.
