= Indi Stivín =

Czech double bass player (born 2001)

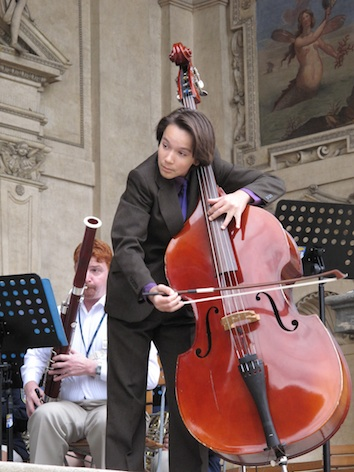
- Stivín performing in September 2014

Background information
- Born: 1 December 2001 (age 24); Prague, Czech Republic
- Genre: Classical
- Occupation: Double bassist
- Instrument: Double bass
- Years active: 2012–present
- Website: www.indistivin.com

Indi Stivín (born 1 December 2001) is a Czech classical double bass player, conductor and composer, winner of many international competitions. He plays double bass as a solo instrument.

== Early life ==
He made his solo debut performance at age 12 with Domenico Dragonetti's Concerto for Double bass and orchestra in A major. Three years later he became the youngest Laureate of the International Instrumental Competition Markneukirchen in Germany.

He studied with Dalibor Tkadlčík, the Prague State Opera's Principal double bassist, prof. Ján Krigovský from the Academy of Arts in Banská Bystrica, Slovakia and prof. Jiří Hudec, Academy of Performing Arts in Prague. At BassFest 2015 in Banská Bystrica his teacher was Gary Karr. In addition to the double bass he plays violin, which he studied at the Prague Conservatory in the class of Jaroslav Foltýn.

In 2018, he performed a solo recital at the Prague Spring Festival. He devotes himself to composing and is the author of the Double bass concerto "Bohemia".

He is an admirer of Czech classical doublebassist František Pošta, to whom he dedicated his composition "A Tribute to František Pošta".

As a finalist of the Eurovision Young Musicians 2018 competition in Edinburgh, Scotland he performed his "Bohemian Suite" together with the BBC Scottish Symphony Orchestra, conducted by Chief Conductor Thomas Dausgaard. His final performance from Usher Hall was broadcast across Europe.

In 2020 he received the "OSA Award" for the best Czech young classical composer.

== Awards ==
- Winner of "Strings Soloist Award" (Semmering, Austria, 2022)
- Winner of "Gottfried von Einem Award" (Semmering, Austria, 2022)
- Laureate of International Double bass Competition, Latin Orchestra of Europe (Frankfurt, Germany, 2021)
- Winner of "OSA Award" for the best Czech young composer (Prague, Czech Republic, 2020)
- Laureate of the International Instrumental Competition Markneukirchen (Germany, 2017)
- Victor Dijon de Monteton Award (Zurich, Switzerland 2016)
- Winner of the International Competition of Double bass Personalities (Wroclaw, Poland 2013)
- multiple winner of "Carl Ditters von Dittersdorf" International Double bass Competition (Bánská Bystrica, Slovakia, 2013, 2014, 2015, 2016)
- multiple winner of "Franz Simandl" International Double bass Competition (Blatná, Czech Republic, 2012, 2014, 2016)
- Winner of the "International Interpretation Competition PRO BOHEMIA" (Ostrava, Czech Republic 2015, 2017)
- Winner of the International Double bass Competition "Frantisek Cerny and Jan Geissel" (Holice, Czech Republic 2016)
- Laureate of the "Anton Rubinstein International Competition" (Düsseldorf, Germany 2018)
- Winner of "Young Soloist" of the South Czech Philharmonic (České Budějovice, Czech Republic 2017)
- Winner of the National Competition of Music Schools (Liberec, Czech Republic 2014)
