= Stivi =

Stivi is a given name. Notable people with the name include:

- Stivi Paskoski, American actor
- Stivi Frashëri, Albanian footballer
- Stivi Vecaj, Albanian footballer

== See also ==
- Stivín
