= Vladimir Novikov =

Vladimir Novikov may refer to:

- Vladimir Novikov (gymnast) (born 1970), Soviet artistic gymnast
- Vladimir Novikov (water polo) (1937–1980), Soviet water polo player
- Vladimir Novikov (politician, born 1907), Soviet politician
- Vladimir Novikov (politician, born 1960), Russian politician
- Vladimir Novikov (politician, born 1966), Russian politician
