= Tanel-Eiko Novikov =

Estonian percussionist (born 2000)

Tanel-Eiko Novikov (born 3 June 2000) is an Estonian classical percussionist, playing marimba and xylophone. He represented Estonia at the Eurovision Young Musicians 2018.

Novikov studied percussion at Tallinn Music High School under Kristjan Mäeots. In 2018, at the age of 17, he won the national competition, the Eesti Rahvusringhääling Award, for young performers, and was chosen to represent Estonia at the Eurovision Young Musicians in Edinburgh. At the Eurovision, he did not qualify for the finals.
