= Birgitta Elisa Oftestad =

Norwegian cellist (born 2002)

- Born: 12 May 2002 (age 23); Oslo, Norway
- Origin: Norwegian
- Genres: Classical
- Occupation: Musician
- Instrument: Cello

Birgitta Elisa Oftestad (born 12 May 2002) is a Norwegian cellist and winner of the 2018 Virtuos competition.

== Biography ==
Oftestad was born in Oslo, started playing cello at the age of 5, and is a student at Barratt Due Institute of Music with Ole Eirik Ree as main teacher. She has been a part of their talent program since 2012. She was a soloist at Oslo Chamber Music Festival and played at the Festspillene i Bergen, where she participated with Crescendo's chamber music program in 2016 with the clarinet trio DaNiBi. She also played as a soloist at many other concerts in Norway and internationally, and has won a lot of prizes, both as chamber musician and soloist. Among these are the Midgard Competition, Young Musicians in Tallinn, Sparre-Olsen Competition and Youth Music Championship, where she was a superfinalist in 2017.

== Honors ==
- 2017: Winner of Solistkonkurransen during the Fjord Cadenza
- 2018: Winner of Virtuos
