= Igor Novikov (painter) =

Russian artist and philosopher

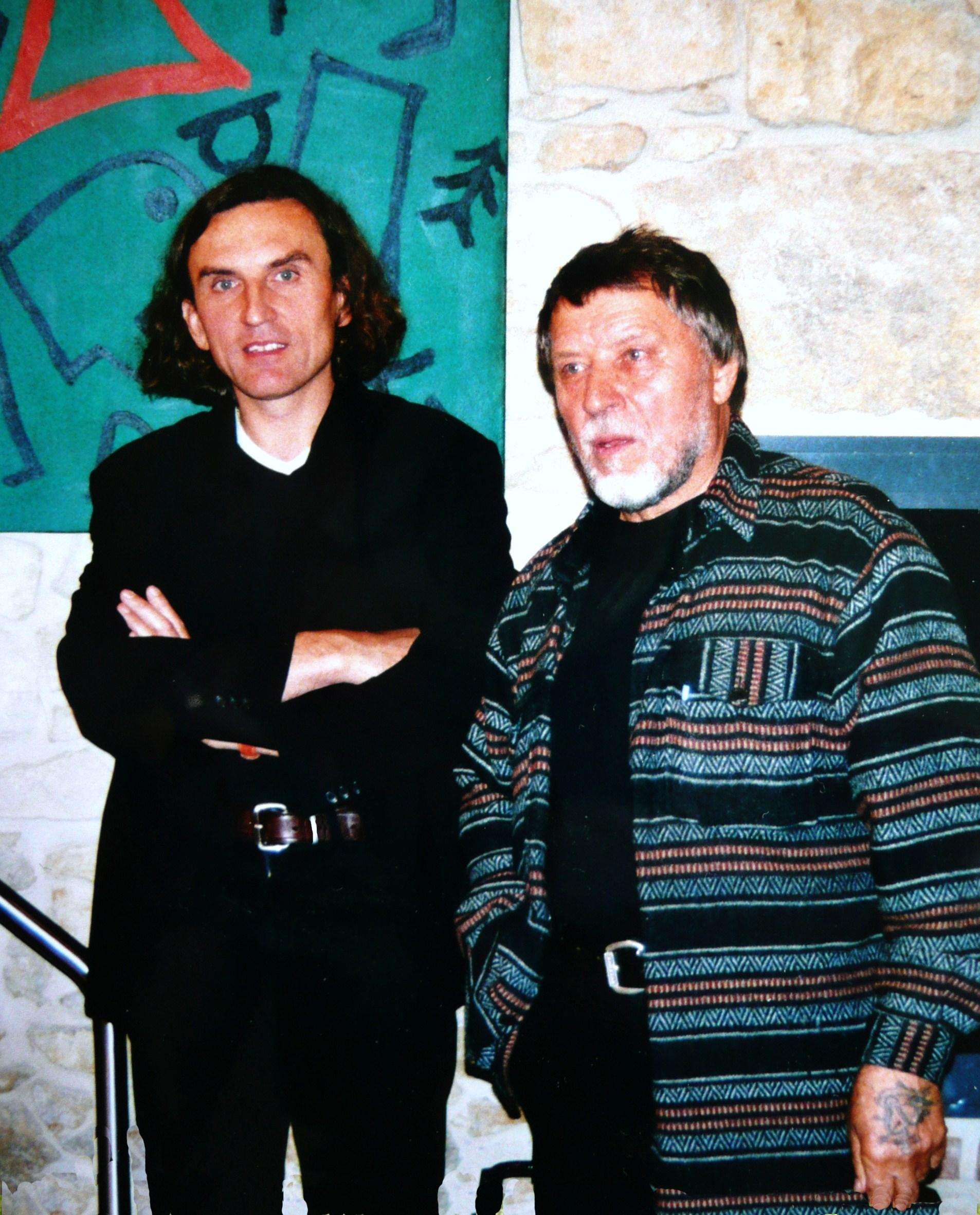
Igor Novikov with father Alexei (2001)

Igor Alekseevich Novikov, also Igor Alexejewitsch Nowikow, (Russian): Новиков, Игорь Алексеевич (born 2 January 1961 in, Moldavian Soviet Socialist Republic) is a Swiss-Russian painter, art theorist, philosopher, artist and member of the Russian Academy of Arts. Igor Novikov belongs to one of the areas of postmodern art, Sots Art. He belongs to the generation of Moscovian Soviet Nonconformist Art painters who have been shaped by the demise of the Soviet Union.

== Life ==
Igor Novikov was born in a family of a famous artist academician Alexey Novikov (Russian: Новиков Алексей Иванович) member of the Imperial Academy of Arts. He belongs to the generation of Moscovian Soviet Nonconformist Art painters who have been shaped by the demise of the Soviet Union. Art Igor Novikov belongs to one of the areas of postmodern art, Sots Art, which has developed in the USSR within the framework of an alternative culture that opposes state ideology. A parody in Novikov's paintings of official art and images of modern mass culture in general, which is reflected in its ironic title, which combined the concepts of social realism and pop art. Igor Novikov creates his own style of drawing, his philosophy in painting, his own direction – suggestisms . Igor Novikov now lives and works on Zurich, Switzerland. Igor Novikov grew up in Moscow. He attended the Ilja-Repin primary and secondary school of Fine Arts. In 1981, he started to study at the Moscow Academy of Fine Arts Vasily Surikov, the central institute for fine arts in the Soviet Union. In 1987 he completed his studies with the Diploma in Painting. Novikov List of Russian artists the term Soviet Nonconformist Art refers to art produced in the former Soviet Union from 1953 to 1990 (after the death of Joseph Stalin until the advent of Perestroika and Glasnost) outside of the rubric of Socialist Realism. Afterwards he founded with young colleagues the colony of artists "Furmanny Lane" in Moscow within the movement of Russian Soviet Nonconformist Art and was member of the group until the closure in 1991. He is considered one of the most influential figures in Nonconformist Art before and after the fall of the Iron Curtain in Russia. "No! and the Conformists”, State Russian Museum, St.Petersburg, catalogue issued. In 1986 he had a personal exhibition at the “Remont” gallery, Warsaw, Poland. Novikov joined the Union of Soviet Artists 1987, and after the fall of the Iron Curtain in Russia.

His "Red and White” exhibition occurred in 1989 in Hala GWARDIA, Warsaw, Poland; he published a catalogue for it.

Igor Novikov received the opportunity for first exhibitions as a student. After the participating in several group exhibitions in Russia, he was permitted to exhibit abroad.

1990' “Furmanny Lane” was exhibitions at the City Museum Le Manoir de la Ville de Martigny, Switzerland, with catalogue. 1992 Personal exhibition at Villa Turque Le Corbusier, EBEL, La Chaux-de-Fonds, Switzerland, catalogue.

1991's exhibitions "NEW Conformists Exhibitions”, and Anselm Kiefer, Georg Baselitz, Torun, Poland, with catalogue.

Igor A. Novikov Solo retrospective national exhibitions took place 1993 in the Tretyakov Gallery in Moscow (solo exhibition) and 1994 within the comprehensive collective exhibit of the art of Russian nonconformists in the Russian Museum in St. Petersburg. Personal exhibition retrospective the Russia Pavillonat the Russian Chamber of Commerce Seville Expo '92. 1994 Personal exhibition retrospective at the Russian Chamber of Commerce, Moscow. From 1990 to 1993, he worked with a UNESCO scholarship in La Chaux-de-Fonds, Switzerland. Exhibitions "Artistes Russes". 1996 Personal exhibition at the Moscow City Council. Exhibition at the "Russian House" and Francisco Infante-Arana, Eduard Gorokhovsky, Budapescht

1997 Personal exhibition presented by Art Collection Otto, Streletzki, Berlin, catalogue issued. 2002 exhibition Igor Novikov and Alexey Novikov, Valeri Zelinski, Le Manoir de la Ville de Martigny, supported by the Russian Embassy in Switzerland, Switzerland . 2003 Personal exhibition at Design Center, Langenthal, Switzerland, with support of the Russian Embassy in Switzerland. 2005 Personal exhibition at Altstadhalle, Zug, Switzerland.

2008 Exhibition at Chelsea Art Museum, New York, Kolodzei Art Foundation of Russian and Eastern European Art, Kolodzei Art Foundation USA, with catalogue. "Igor Novikov: Goodbye Russia" catalogue for the Solo Exhibition retrospective at Koller Auctions, Zürich. Kunstberatung Zürich AG, 2009.

Exhibitions retrospective "Igor Novikov: Impression 100/50" catalogue for the Solo Exhibition at Nadja Brykina Gallery AG, Zürich, and Russian Contemporary Arts Foundation, supported by the Russian Embassy in Switzerland Zürich 2010. More work stays in Western countries followed, e.g. in Klagenfurt, Austria, and in Berlin, Germany.

Since 1979, Igor Novikov has participated in over a hundred group exhibitions in museums and galleries around the world, including the first show of nonconformist art. Works by Novikov can be found in the collections of major museums: the State Tretyakov Gallery (Moscow), the Moscow Museum of Modern Art, the Ludwig Museum major public collections in Russia, Europe, and the United States

Since 1990 he lives and works in Bern, Zurich Switzerland.

== Works ==
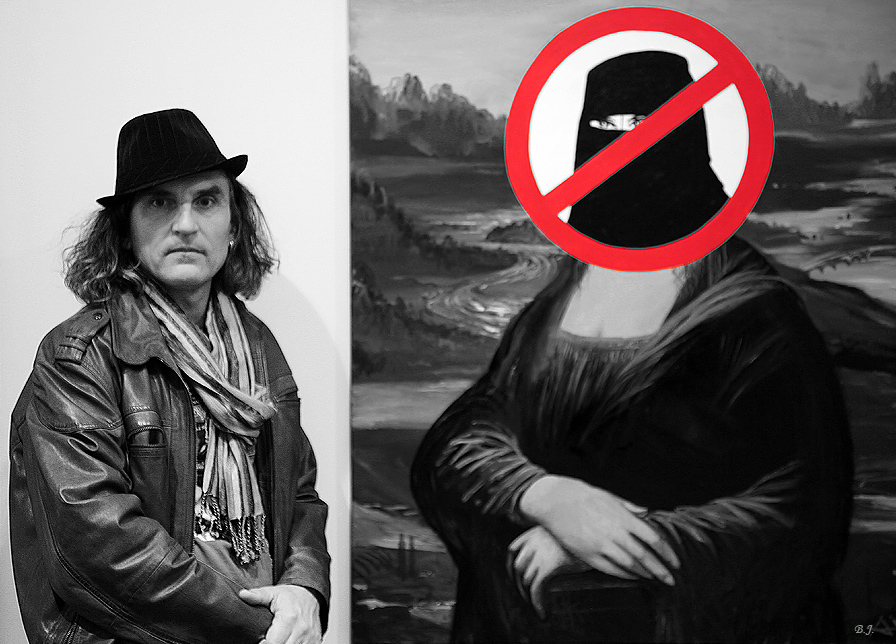
Igor Novikov and his painting Miss Switzerland. Nadja Brykina Gallery (2010)' Zürich

Igor Novikov blends in his paintings diverse techniques, styles and time levels. As background he often applies classical paintings from the world heritage of fine arts, in particular master pieces of Russian painters of the 19th century. He replicates these works while alienating them superficially with graphical figures or pictograms. This gives to the paintings surprising and often ironic relationships to real life and current situations. Thus his works become testimonies of the transition of the Soviet Union to modern Russia, but also of Swiss or European issues. This contradiction of well-known classics and modern alienation results in strong messages and effects.

== Exhibitions ==
2025

Igor Novikov at a personal exhibition "Utopias"Artefact Gallery Center Prechistenka Moscow

2024

Igor Novikov "Ierotopia" at a personal exhibition . Museum of Nonconformism Nadja Brykina Nadja Brykina Gallery Moscow

2023

Igor Novikov at a personal exhibition "Nashi" Museum of Modern Art "Erarta" St. Petersburg
"Novikov&Malevich" at a personal exhibition the Museum of the Avant-Garde in Moscow
Igor Novikov at a personal exhibition "Levitation". The State Vladimir-Suzdal Museum-Reserve Vladimir
Igor and Alexey Novikov "PARADIS" State Rybinsk Museum-Reserve presents a joint exhibition project

2022

Igor and Alexey Novikov "Diolegia" Ryazan State Regional Art Museum named after I.P. Pozhalostin
«EMANATION»at a personal exhibition Kostroma Museum State Historical, Architectural and Art Museum-Reserve Kostroma
«Inspiration» Igor and Alexey Novikov in the Romanov Museum State Historical, Architectural and Art Museum-Reserve Kostroma
Igor Novikov at the Personal exhibition The Kostroma State Historical, Architectural and Art Museum-Reserve
Igor Novikov Russian Swings personal exhibition gallery of contemporary art "Di Di", St. Petersburg catalogue

2021

Igor Novikov at the Personal exhibition The Yaroslavl Art Museum
Novikov & Новиков at the Personal exhibition The Plyos state historical and Art Museum reserve
Igor Novikov personal exhibition Imperial Tver Travel Palace Tver Regional Art Gallery

2020

Igor Novikov “EXIT”at the Personal exhibition The Moscow Museum of Modern Art presents its 20th anniversary catalogue
"A man of bones, flesh and blood," the Pushkin State Museum of Fine Arts Ivan Tsvetaev Educational Art Museum State University for the Humanities (RSUH) Moscow catalogue
6 Interregional Academic Research Project "Red Gate", "Against the Current" of the Ministry of Culture of the Russian Federation catalogue

2019

Igor Novikov, Tatiana Nzarenko “Metamorphosen” Gallery Moenius Muri Bern catalogue
Igor Novikov at the Personal exhibition The Tula Museum of Fine Arts
Igor Novikov, Tatiana Nzarenko, Alexey Novikov Exhibition exhibition at the Museum of St. Petersburg Art (20th–21st centuries) catalogue
Exhibition “Grotesque” exhibition at the Museum of St. Petersburg Art (20th–21st centuries)
Igor Novikov Anniversary exhibition for the 25th anniversary of the gallery. From 15.01 to 28.02.2019 in the Gallery of Nadja Brykina in Moscow
Hermitage Fine Art ( with T. Nazarenko, A. Novikov) Monaco France catalogue

2018

Personal exhibition at the Personal exhibition, Hermitage Fine Art, Monaco, France catalogue
Personal exhibition at the Tatiana Nazarenko “Time Space “ State Budgetary Institution of Culture of the Voronezh Region “Voronezh Regional Art Museum. I. Kramskoy “Russia
Exhibition “Marx forever” the State Russian Museum, St. Petersburg catalogue

2017

Personal exhibition at the Shchukin Gallery 4, avenue Matignon 75008 Paris, France with catalogue
Personal exhibition at the Jedlitschka Gallery, Zürich, Switzerland catalogue

2016

Personal exhibition in Plyos State Museum of Landscape of history, architecture and art Russia

2015

Personal exhibition Museum and Exhibition Center Association Moscow

2014

Personal exhibition at the Du Château Gallery, Môtiers, Switzerland

2013

Personal exhibition at gallery im Schloss Hünigen, Switzerland

2012

Personal retrospective exhibition at the Russian Contemporary Arts Foundation, Zürich

2011

Exhibition and Alexey Novikov gallery Klosbach 45, Zürich

2010

Personal retrospective exhibition at the Nadya Brykina Gallery, Zurich, with catalogue, supported by the Russian Embassy in Switzerland
Personal exhibition and Alexey Novikov gallery Kunstberatug, Zürich

2009

Personal exhibition retrospective at the Koller Auction, Zurich, with catalogue

2008

Personal exhibition at Chelsea Art Museum, New York, with catalogue

2007

Personal exhibition gallery Spillgerte, Enetchirel, Switzerland
Exhibition at Europ'Art Art Fair, Geneva, Switzerland, with catalogue

2006

Personal exhibition Gartenflugel Gallery, Ziegelbrucke, Switzerland
Exhibition at Europ'ART Art Fair, Geneva, Switzerland, with catalogue
Personal exhibition at Adler Gallery, Geneva, Gstaad, Switzerland and London, UK

2005

Personal exhibition at Altstadhalle, Zug, Switzerland
Personal exhibition at The Centre Dürrenmatt, designed by Mario Botta, Neuchatel Switzerland

2004

Personal exhibition at "O" Gallery, Schaffhausen, Switzerland
Personal exhibition at Franziskanergasse Gallery, Salzburg, Austria

2003

Personal exhibition at the Gallery in Schloss Hünigen, Switzerland
Personal exhibition at Arte Fiz Art Gallery, Zurich, Switzerland
Personal exhibition at Design Center, Langenthal, Switzerland, with support of the Russian Embassy in Switzerland

2002

Personal exhibition at the Du Château Gallery, Môtiers, Switzerland, with support of the Russian Embassy in Switzerland
Personal exhibition at Au Paon Gallery, Avenches, Switzerland
Personal exhibition at the Russian Chamber of Commerce, Moscow, supported by the Russian Embassy in Switzerland and Swiss Embassy in Moscow and the Moscow City Hall
"Artistes russes" exhibition at the City Museum "Le Manoir de la Ville de Martigny" supported by the Russian Embassy in Switzerland, Switzerland, with catalogue

2001

Exhibition at the Gallery of Christine Brügger, Bern, Switzerland
Personal exhibition "Im Höchhus" Gallery, Küsnacht, Switzerland

2000

Personal exhibition at "Im Hof" Gallery, Zug, Switzerland
Exhibition at "O" Gallery, Schaffhausen, Switzerland

1999

Personal exhibition at the Russian Chamber of Commerce, Moscow
Personal exhibition at the Callet Molin gallery, Vevey, Switzerland

1998

Personal exhibition at the "Franziskanergasse Gallery", Salzburg, Austria

1997

Personal exhibition presented by Art Collection Otto, Streletzki, Berlin, catalogue issued

1996

Personal exhibition at the Moscow City Council
Exhibition at the "Russian House" and Francisco Infante-Arana, Eduard Gorokhovsky, Budapescht

1995

Personal exhibition at the “Radisson-Slavyanskaya” Hotel in Moscow

1994

Personal exhibition at Schloss Landskron, Villach, Austria
Personal exhibition at the Russian Chamber of Commerce, Moscow
Personal exhibition at the Bank of Austria, Villach, Austria

1993

Personal retrospective exhibition at the Museum "State Tretyakov Gallery", Moscow. Catalogue issued
Personal exhibition at the Russian Foundation of Culture, Moscow
“No! and the Conformists”, State Russian Museum, St. Petersburg, catalogue issued
“No! and the Conformists”, Museum of Warsaw, Poland, catalogue issued
Personal exhibition at Hermagor Rathaus-Museum, Austria
Auction “Perestroika”, “Drouot” Richelieu, Paris, France, catalogue issued

1992

Personal exhibition "IL Cavaletto" gallery, Locarno, Switzerland, catalogue issued
Art Expo “Tias”, Tokio. Japan, catalogue has been issued
Personal exhibition at “Au Paon” Gallery, Avanches, Switzerland

1991

Exhibitions "New Conformists Exhibitions”, at Anselm Kiefer, Georg Baselitz, Torun, Poland, with catalogue.
Personal exhibition at the "Morgan Manor”, San-Francisco, USA, with catalogue
Personal exhibition at Villa Turque, EBEL, La Chaux-de-Fonds, Switzerland, catalogue
“Modern Art from Russia” and “Contemporary Masters” exhibitions at the Art Fair, Hong Kong
Personal exhibition at the “La Plume” Gallery, La Chaux-de-Fonds, Switzerland

1990

“Furmanny Lane”, exhibition at the City Museum Le Manoir de la Ville de Martigny, Switzerland, with catalogue
Personal exhibition “Soviet Art of Glasnost”, at the “Du Cygne” Gallery, Geneva, Switzerland
Exhibition at the "InterArt" International Art Fair, Warsaw, Poland, with catalogue
Exhibition at the International Art Fair “Herbst”, Frankfurt, Germany, with catalogue

1989

"Red and White” exhibition, Hala GWARDIA, Warsaw, Poland, catalogue published
“Red and White” exhibition, Havenmuseum, Amsterdam, the Netherlands, catalogue published
“Furmanny Lane” exhibition, Museum of Technics in Warsaw, Poland, catalogue

1988

Exhibited at the XIV International Art Fair “Perestroyka”, Rome, Italy, with catalogue
Auction of Modern Art "Druout", Richelieu, Paris, France, catalogue issued

1987

“Soviet Avant-Garde” exhibition at the Art Fair, Buenos Aires, Argentine
“Russia’s Youth” exhibition, Helsinki, Finland

1987-90

Exhibitions at Furmanny Pereulok, Moscow, USSR
Interart-87 exhibition at Art Fair, Poznan, Poland

1986

Personal exhibition at the “Remont” gallery, Warsaw, Poland

== Collection ==
- Ministry of Culture of Russia, Moscow
- The State Russian Museum, Saint Petersburg
- State Tretyakov Gallery, Moscow
- Russia's Foundation of Culture, Moscow
- State Moscow's Duma
- Museum of Modern Art, Moscow
- The Costakis Collection, Athens
- Russia's Chamber of Commerce
- The Russian Academy of Arts
- Russian Contemporary Arts Foundation, Zürich
- Bank SKA, Switzerland
- Bank UBS, Switzerland
- Kolodzei Collection of Russian and Eastern European Art, Kolodzei Art Foundation, USA
- Bank of Austria
- Kunstsammlung Otto, Streletzki, Berlin
- Ludwig's collection
- The State Center of Contemporary Art, Moscow, Russia
- Collections Montres EBEL, Switzerland
- Corbusier House, Switzerland
- Adler, Geneva, London
- Partiy, A. Mineev, London
- FINNAIR
- Polish Foundation of Modern Art
- Mitsubici
- Nekrasow, Moscow
- Museum of Modern Art “MARS”, Moscow
- Gorbatchev's Foundation
- EDH, Switzerland
- Collection of Talochkin, Moscow
- Collection of Nutovitch, Moscow
- Collection of Vasco de Andreade, Belgique
- Morgan
- Collections of City's Museum: Moscow, Germany, Switzerland, Austria, Amsterdam, France, Finland, Vienna, USA, Berlin

== Gallery ==
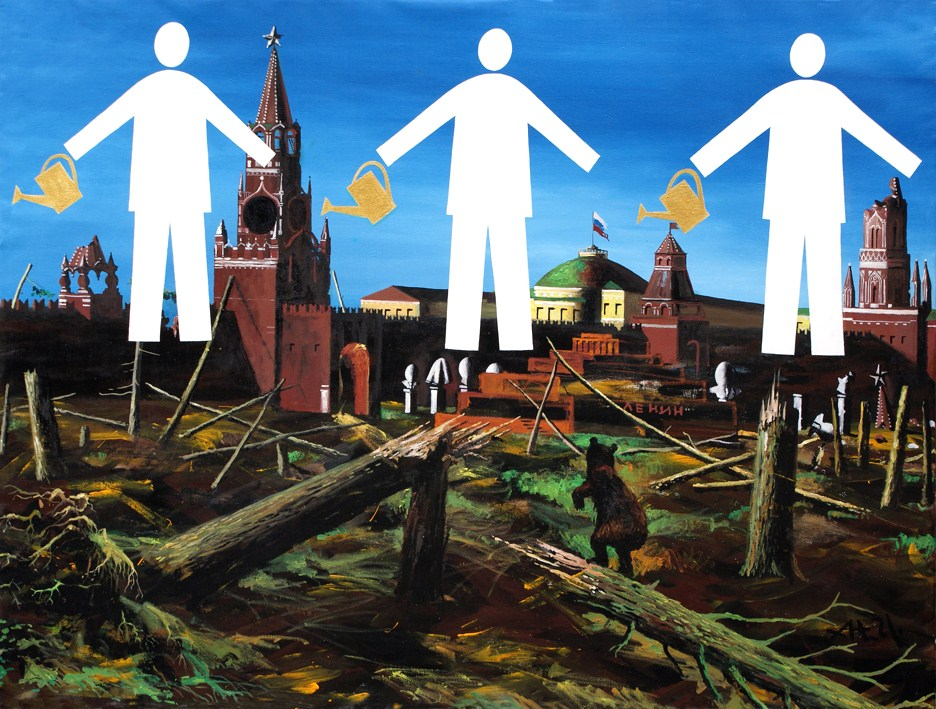
Goodbye Russia, 2003

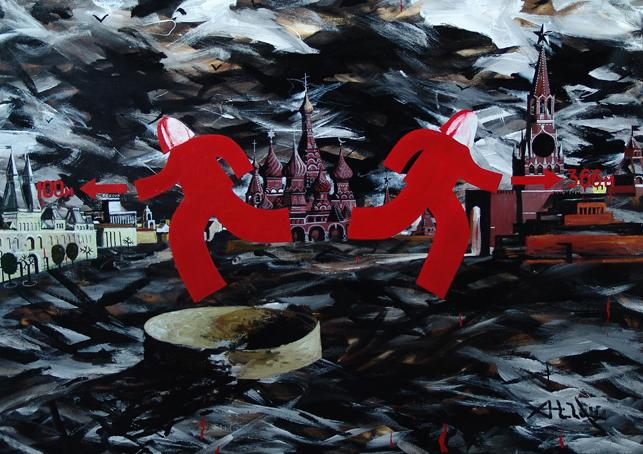
Kreml Marathon, 2004

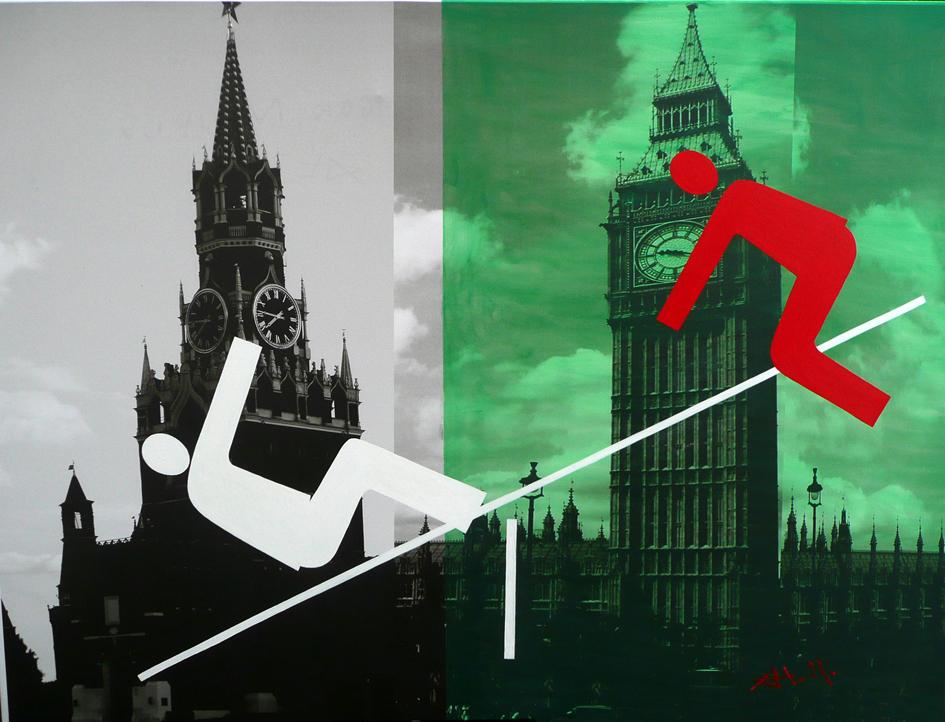
Russian Swing, 2004

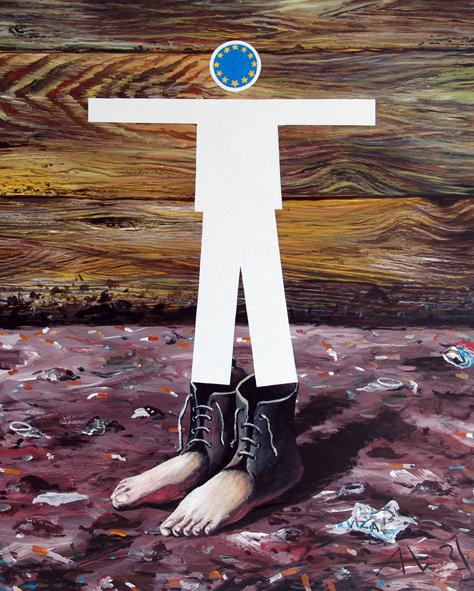
Launch Failure, 2005

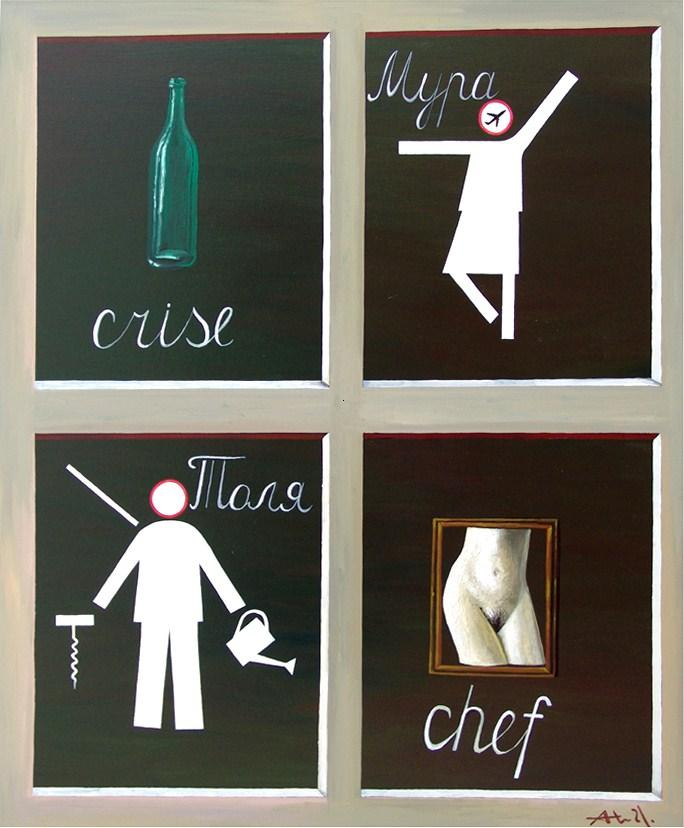
Russian Sudoku, 2005

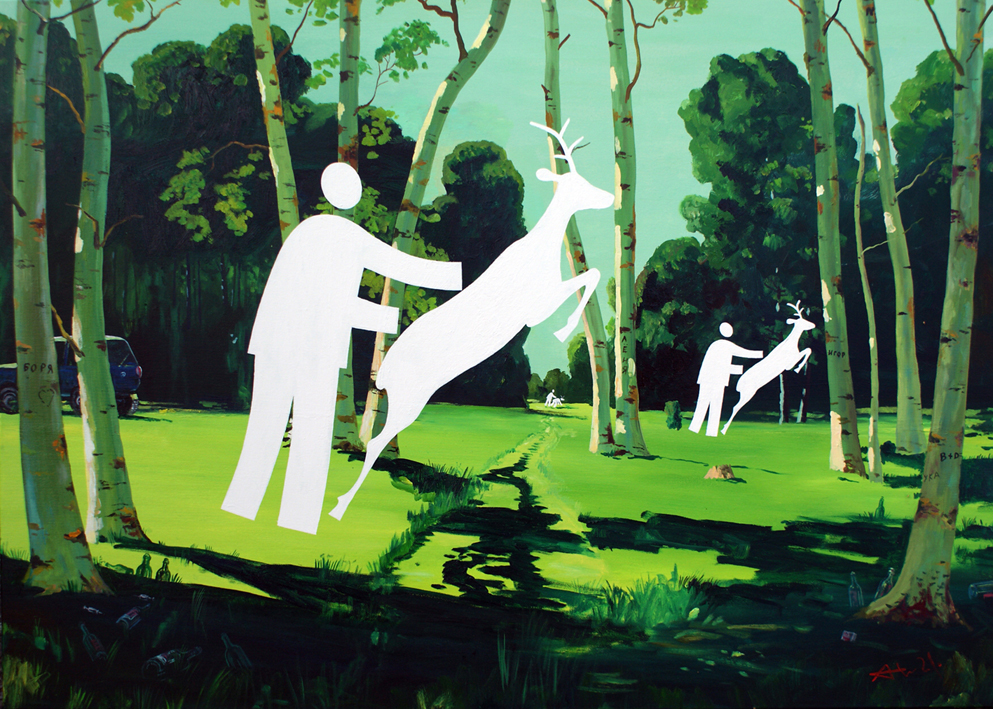
Diamond Grove, 2007

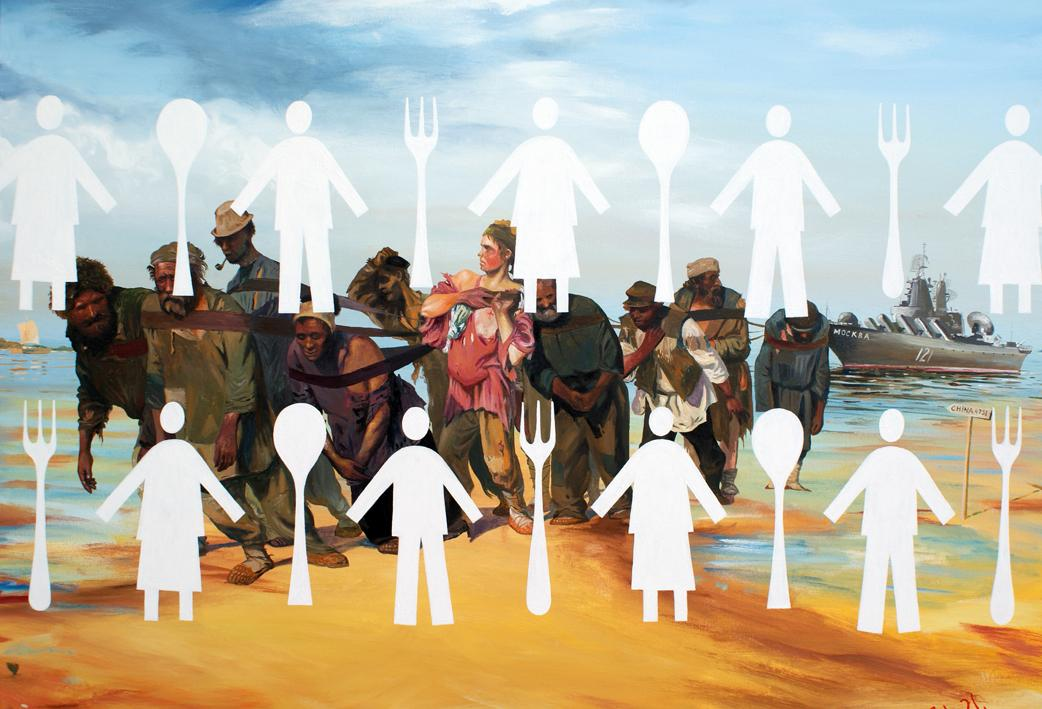
Kreml Breakfast, 2007

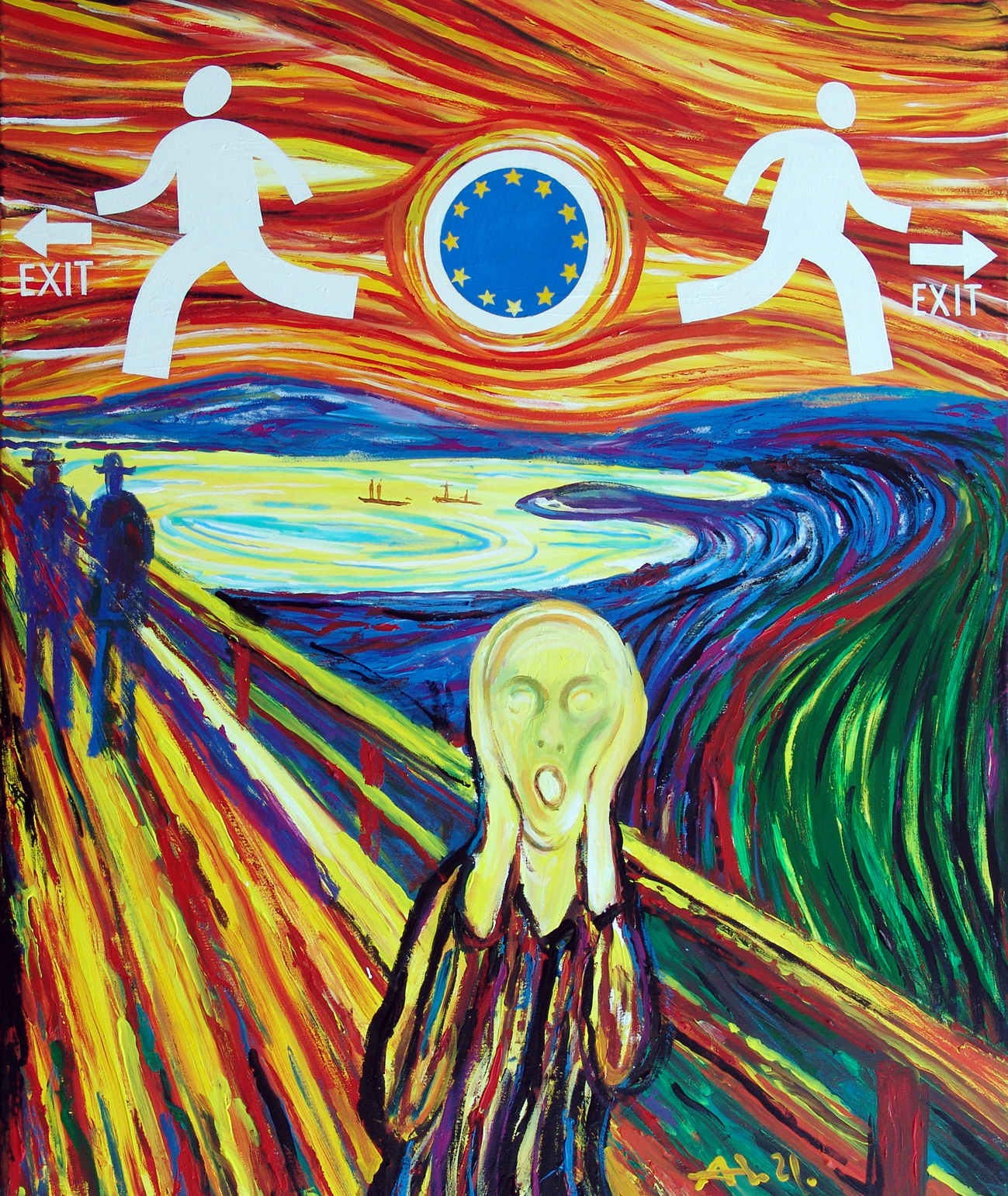
Auf Wiedersehen Europa (Goodbye Europe), 2007

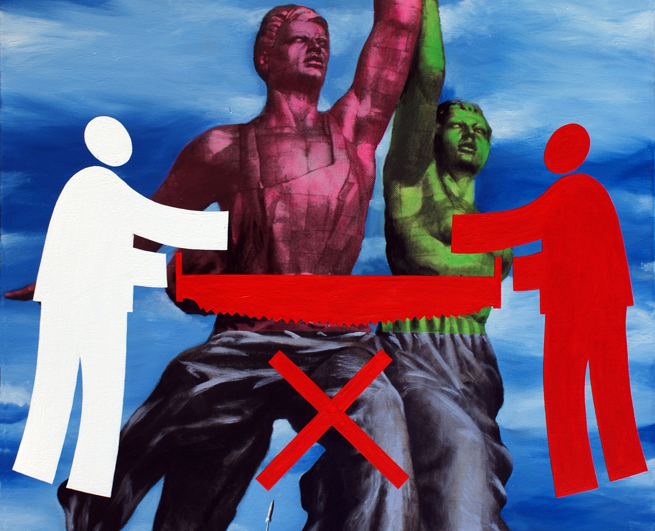
Happy End, 2009

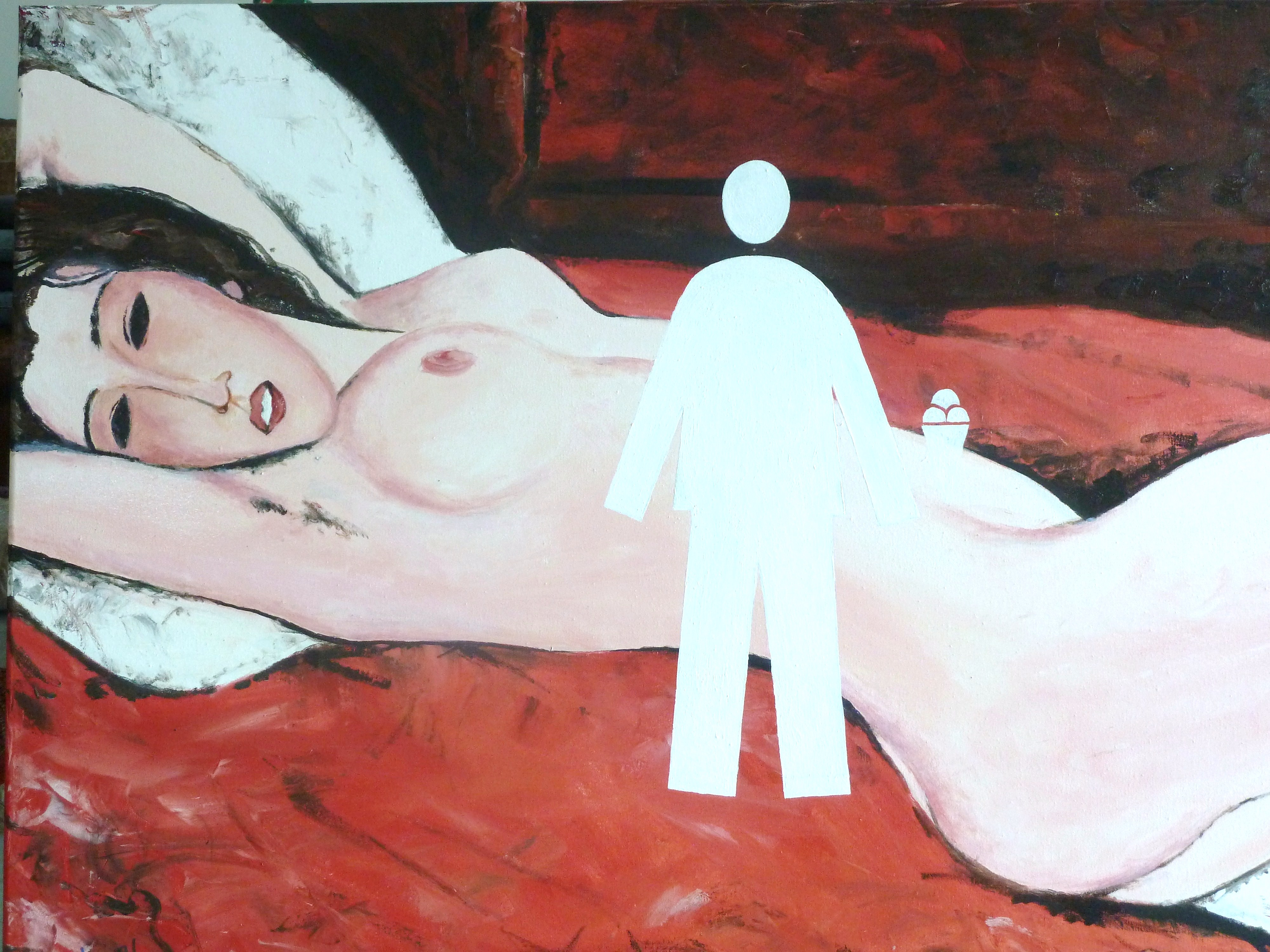
Gelati, 2012

== Literature ==
- "Red and White". Open Haven Museum, Amsterdam, the Netherlands 1989.
- "Les ateliers de la rue Furmann". Ed. Jean-Pierre Brossard, Editions d'En Haut, Le Manoir de la Ville de Martigny, Martigny, Switzerland 1990, ISBN 2-88251-016-0.
- "Confrontation in Fine Arts Toruń 91". Centre of Contemporary Arts Toruń, Toruń, Poland 1991.
- "Igor Novikov". Catalogue for the Solo Exhibition, Editions d'En Haut, from the Series "Jeunes creators", La Chaux-de-Fonds 1992, Switzerland, ISBN 2-88251-049-7.
- In: "No – and the Conformists”, Faces of Soviet Art of 50s to 80s. Fundacja Polskiej Sztuki Nowoczesnej, Warszawa 1994. pp. 384–389. ISBN 83-221-0648-3.
- "The Tretykov Gallery”. The Master Painters: Igor Novikov. Edition for the Solo Exhibition. Text in English and Russian. Geneva: Studio Editions, 1998. ASIN B0025XV87E.
- "Artistes Russes". Igor Novikov and Alexey Novikov, Yuri Zubenko, Valeri Zelinski, Le Manoir de la Ville de Martigny, Switzerland 2002.
- "Igor Novikov - Misteries". Catalogue for the Solo Exhibition, Dominik Schoch, Studio Editions Bern, Bern 2008.
- "Igor Novikov: Goodbye Russia”. Catalogue for the Solo Exhibition at Koller Auctions, Zürich. Kunstberatung Zürich AG, 2009.
- "Igor Novikov: Impression 100/50". Catalogue for the Solo Exhibition at Nadja Brykina Gallery AG, Zürich, and Russian Contemporary Arts Foundation, Zürich 2010.
- "Igor Novikov" and many more exhibition Russian Academy of Arts Moscow, Moscow Museum of Modern Art, Creative Russian contemporary, Manege Government of Moscow department of culture Catalogues, 2015.
- "Igor Novikov Tatiana Nazarenko Alexey Novikov" Personal exhibition Jedlitschka Gallery, Zürich, Switzerland, Catalogue 2017.
- "Igor Novikov Tatiana Nazarenko" SHCHUKIN GALLERY 4, avenue Matignon 75008 Paris, France Catalogue 2017.
- "Igor Novikov Tatiana Nazarenko Alexey Novikov" Personal exhibition at the Museum of St. Petersburg Art (20th–21st centuries Russia) Catalogue
- "Igor Novikov Tatiana Nazarenko Metamorphosen" Gallery Moenius Muri Bern (catalogue)
