= Usher Hall =

Concert hall in Edinburgh, Scotland, United Kingdom

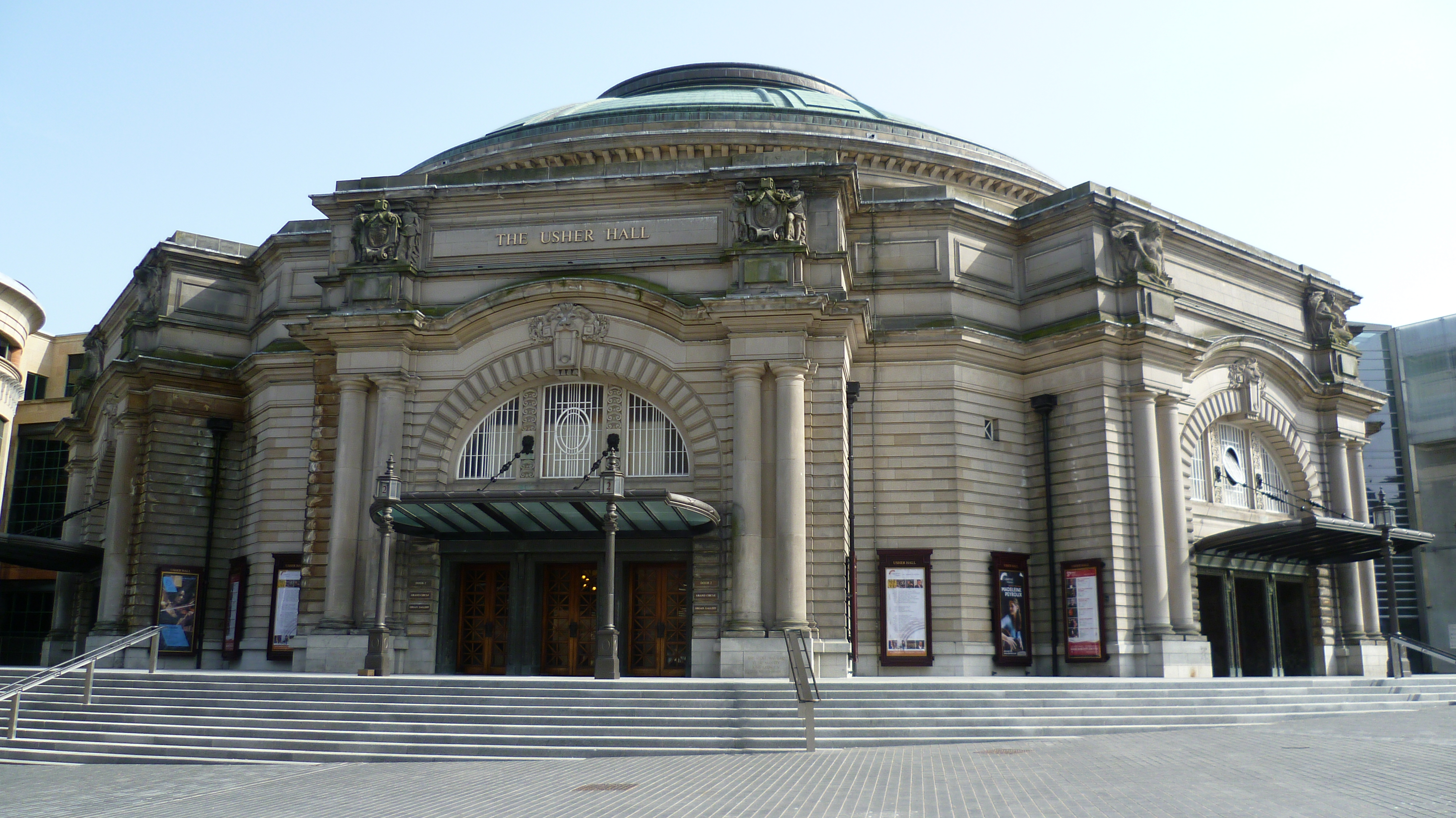
- The Usher Hall as seen from Lothian Road
- Interactive map of Usher Hall
- Address: Lothian Road, Edinburgh, EH1 2EA
- Location: Edinburgh, Scotland
- Coordinates: 55.94675°N 3.20420°W
- Owner: City of Edinburgh Council
- Capacity: 2,200
- Type: Concert hall

Construction
- Opened: 16 March 1914
- Renovated: 2010
- Architects: Stockdale Harrison and Howard H Thomson

Website
- www.usherhall.co.uk

The Usher Hall (Scottish Gaelic: Talla Usher) is a concert hall in the West End of Edinburgh, Scotland. The hall is owned and managed by the City of Edinburgh Council, and has hosted concerts and events since its construction in 1914, with capacity for approximately 2,200 people in the auditorium.

In March 1972, the Eurovision Song Contest was held at the Hall and compèred by Moira Shearer. This marked the first time that the Eurovision Song Contest had been held in Scotland. It was also the venue of Eurovision Young Musicians in August 2018. In 1986, the Commonwealth Games was hosted by Edinburgh, with the Usher Hall providing the venue for the boxing tournament.

The Hall is flanked by The Royal Lyceum Theatre to the south and The Traverse Theatre to the north, and has received Category A Listed Building status by Historic Environment Scotland.

== History ==
=== Construction ===
The construction of the hall was funded by Andrew Usher, a whisky distiller and blender, who donated £100,000 to the city specifically to fund a new concert hall. The choice of site caused early delays but in 1910 an architectural competition was announced with the requirement that the hall be simple but dignified. The winning bid (one of 130 entries) came from Stockdale Harrison & Howard H Thomson of Leicester. The design was partly a backlash against Victorian Gothic, with a return to classical features owing much to the Beaux-Arts style. On 19 July 1911, George V and Queen Mary laid two memorial stones, an event attended by over a thousand people.

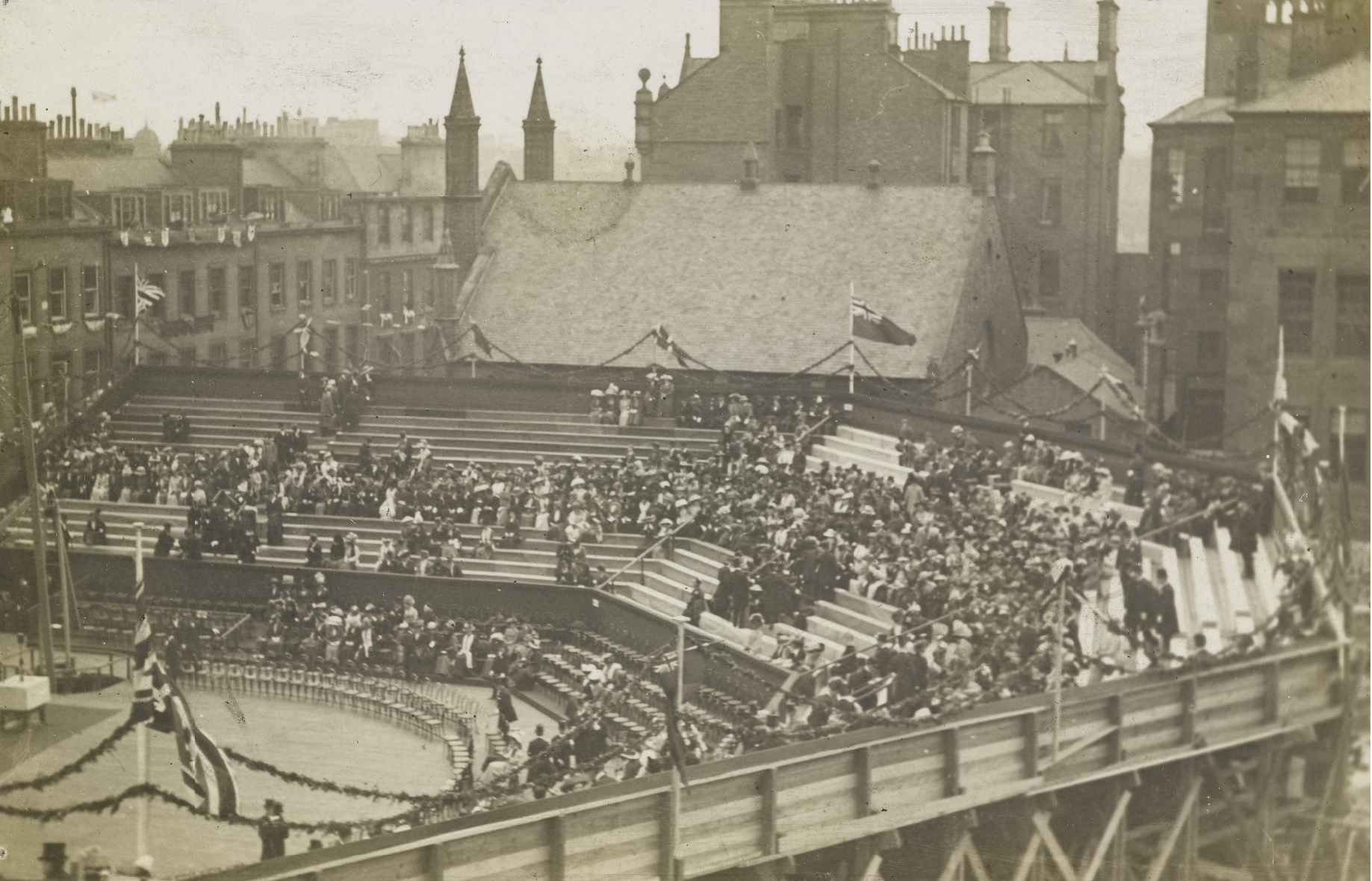
The laying of the foundation stone, 1911

Its curved walls, unusual for the time, were made possible by developments in reinforced concrete. The dome was designed to reflect the curvature of the walls, not to give a domed interior (which would have been acoustically disastrous).

The interior of the hall is adorned with decorative plaster panels by the Edinburgh sculptor Harry Gamley. The figures depicted in these panels show figures from the world of music, as well as famous Scots. These include: Sir Walter Scott, Robert Burns, Allan Ramsay, R L Stevenson, Johann Sebastian Bach, George Frideric Handel, Wolfgang Amadeus Mozart, Johannes Brahms, Edvard Grieg and Anton Rubinstein. Harry Gamley's work also features on the outside of the building with two large figures representing Inspiration and Achievement, as well as another three figures by Crossland McClure depicting the Soul of Music, Music of the Sea and Music of the Woods.

=== Opening ===
The finished building was officially opened on 16 March 1914 with a concert featuring music by Handel, Bach, Wagner, Beethoven and the Scottish composer Hamish MacCunn. The final cost of building the Usher Hall was £134,000. Andrew Usher died before building work was started.

=== Social history ===
The Usher Hall has been used for a variety of events, including politics, religion, charity fundraisers and sport, as well as music. In 1914 Prime Minister H. H. Asquith gave a speech entitled the War, using the occasion to recruit from the all-male audience. At various times the musical and the political overlapped, on occasions such as fundraising concerts for the Republican movement in Spain in the 1930s and sexcentenary celebrations of the foundation of the City of Edinburgh in 1929. The end to political rallies in the Usher Hall came after a serious incident in 1934, when Sir Oswald Mosley came to speak. Between five and six thousand people protested outside, and several people were injured.

In 1986 the Commonwealth Games came to Edinburgh with the Usher Hall providing the venue for the boxing tournament. The extensive basement rooms of the Usher Hall made the building ideal for use as an air-raid shelter and the venue was equipped for use during the Second World War. However, there are no records of it being used as such, but painted signs on internal doors, such as "No Dogs" indicate that preparations were made.

=== Musical history ===
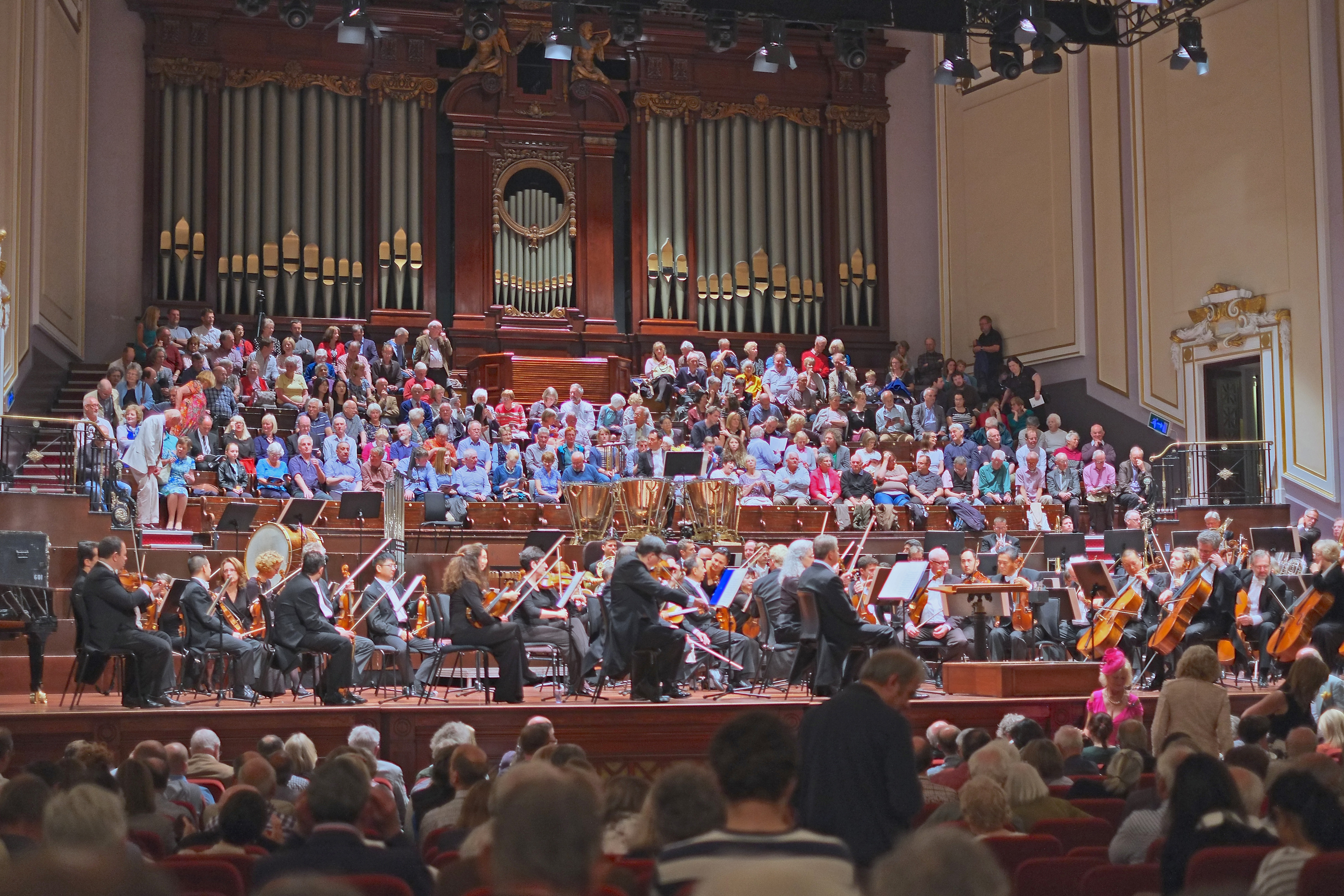
An orchestra on stage, showing the hall's organ in the background

The Scottish premiere of Edward Elgar's 2nd Symphony was presented in Usher Hall on 9 February 1920 along with arias performed by tenor Vladimir Rosing. As a platform for international classical musicians, the hall hosted the Vienna Philharmonic, under Bruno Walter, at the first festival in 1947. It is also the Edinburgh home of the Royal Scottish National Orchestra, who play regularly during their season. The Scottish Chamber Orchestra, Scottish Fiddle Orchestra, National Youth Orchestra of Scotland and local organisations, such as the Edinburgh Royal Choral Union and the Kevock Choir, also regularly appear.

In March 1972, the Eurovision Song Contest was held at the Hall and compèred by Moira Shearer. It was also the venue of Eurovision Young Musicians in August 2018.

=== Organ ===
A major feature of the Usher Hall is the organ. It was built in 1913 by Norman & Beard of Norwich at a cost of around £4000, and was designed to be the focal point of the Hall, both visually and musically. The significance of the organ to the Usher Hall is demonstrated by the existence of the Usher Hall Organ Trust, who helped raise funds to restore the organ. It had fallen into disuse due to poor reliability caused by a lack of adequate moisture and temperature control, leading to it not being played for several years. The restoration work was carried out by Harrison and Harrison of Durham, and took three years to complete, with the organ being reinstalled in 2002. The organ was re-inaugurated on 7 June 2003 in a celebratory concert recital by Gillian Weir.

== Present day ==
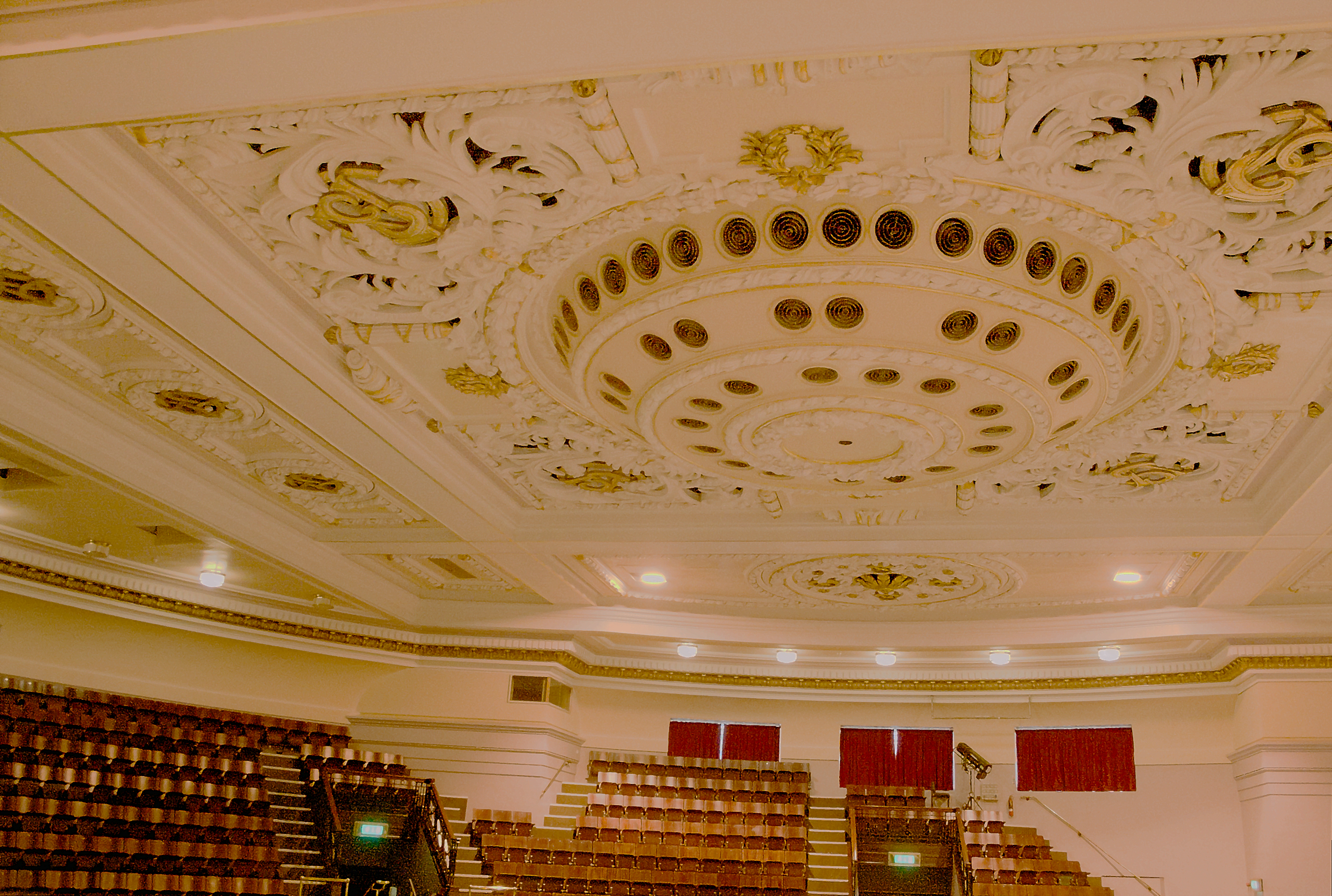
Detailing of the roof structure within the auditorium

=== Ownership ===
Still owned and managed by the City of Edinburgh Council, the Usher Hall is still in constant use. As well as being one of the main venues for the Edinburgh International Festival, other events have been held, such as the Holocaust Memorial Ceremony and the Colin O'Riordan Memorial Concert. Freedom of the City ceremonies have taken place at the hall over the years, with the most recent being for film star and Scottish icon Sean Connery in 1991.

=== Renovation ===
On 13 April 1996, hours after a concert, a large piece of plaster fell 130 feet (40 metres) from the roof into the auditorium. Only three chairs were damaged, but this event was just one example of the state of disrepair into which the Hall was falling. Vital repairs were necessary to make the building wind-proof, watertight and safe. Relying heavily on Lottery and Arts Council funding, the City of Edinburgh embarked on a £25 million scheme to both make the hall safe and improve its function - including making the auditorium suitable for Promenade-type events and building new catering and ticketing facilities. Unfortunately, late into the design phase, the Lottery Fund application failed and the Arts Council withdrew its support. Mired in controversy, the project collapsed. In 1998 the City of Edinburgh announced it had put aside £9 million to start the refurbishment again.

In 2002 plans for a second phase of refurbishment were announced with plans to raise the further £11 million required. In 2007 work on the second phase began, which provided improved facilities and public spaces, including the construction of a new glass wing. The work was completed in 2010 at a total cost of £40 million.

== See also ==
- List of Category A listed buildings in the Old Town, Edinburgh
- List of Edinburgh music venues
- List of concert halls
- Adjoining buildings
  - Royal Lyceum Theatre
  - Traverse Theatre

Preceded by Gaiety Theatre; Dublin	Eurovision Song Contest; Venue; 1972	Succeeded by Théâtre Municipal; Luxembourg City
