= Arvid Fladmoe =

Norwegian musician (1915–1993)

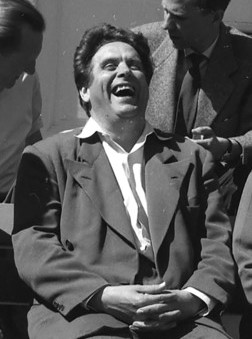
Arvid Flamoe picture

Arvid Fladmoe (8 May 1915 – 18 November 1993) was a Norwegian composer and conductor. He was particularly known for his work as conductor of opera and operetta.

== Background ==
Arvid Emil Fladmoe was born in Oslo, Norway. His parents were Victor Emil Fladmoe (died 1957) and Valborg Fladmoe (1892-1971). He trained with Carl Flesch at the Royal Academy of Music in London. He also studied with Max Rostal in Oslo.

== Career ==
His solo debut as a violinist took place during November 1933 in the Ceremony Hall of the University of Oslo (Universitetets Aula). In 1938, he was appointed concertmaster of the Bergen Philharmonic Orchestra where he stayed for two years. During World War II, he taught at the Barratt Dues Music Institute which had been founded and was operated by his wife's parents, Mary Louise Barratt Due (1888–1969) and Henrik Adam Due (1891-1966).

On 20 February 1944, Flame was aboard the ferry D/F Hydro when it was sunk in a commando operation. The Hydro was carrying heavy water that would have been used in Nazi Germany's nuclear weapons programme.

In 1945, Fladmoe made his debut as conductor of the National Theatre in Oslo and continued until there until 1959, except for the 1947–48 seasons where he was conductor of the Trondheim Symphony Orchestra. He conducted both the Oslo Philharmonic Orchestra and the Bergen Philharmonic Orchestra and was principal conductor in Bergen from 1958 until 1961. He was the first musical director at the Norwegian National Opera from 1961 to 1973. He also served as professor at Norwegian Academy of Music.

Arvid Fladmoe wrote numerous compositions for voice, for orchestra and several chamber works. In 1966, Fladmoe was made a Knight first Class of the Royal Norwegian Order of St. Olav. In 1973, he also received the King's Medal of Merit in gold.

== Works ==
=== Solo voice ===
- Barcarole (baritone and orchestra)
- Besvergelse (baritone and string quartet)
- Bukkerittet (2 voices and orchestra)
- Et Barn (voice and piano
- Kannarhaugene (1984) (baritone and orchestra)
- Sanger om døden (1990) (soprano, violin, viola and cello)
- Svana eld fra "På Kannarhaugene" (voice, string quartet)
- Tre sange (baritone and orchestra)
- Tre sanger (1985) (soprano, violin, viola and cello)

=== Orchestral works ===
- Caprice (1984) (oboe solo and orchestra)
- Musikk for cello og orkester
- Musikk for orkester (1984)
- Musikk for strykere (1981) (string orchestra)
- Suite for orkester
- Suite (1984-1986) (orchestra)

=== Chamber music ===
- Divertimento (flute, clarinet and bassoon)
- Kvartettsats (string quartet)
- Liten trio (1976) (flute, clarinet and bassoon)
- Musikk for strykekvartett
- Preludium (string quartet)

Cultural offices
Preceded by Carl von Garaguly	Principal Conductors, Bergen Philharmonic Orchestra; 1958–1961	Succeeded by Karsten Andersen
