= Odd Grüner-Hegge =

Norwegian conductor and composer (1899–1973)

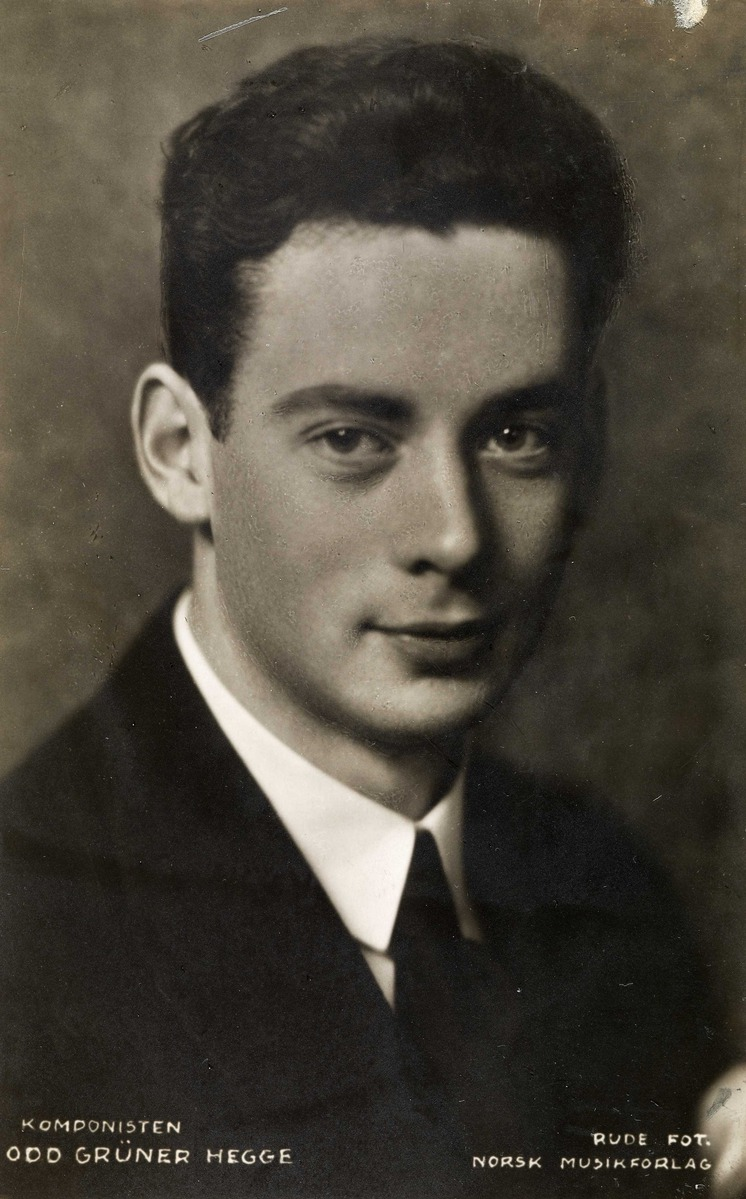
- Born: September 23, 1899; Kristiania (now Oslo), Norway
- Died: May 11, 1973 (aged 73); Oslo, Norway
- Occupations: Conductor and composer
- Relatives: Ivar Welle

Odd Ragnar Grüner-Hegge (September 23, 1899 – May 11, 1973) was a Norwegian conductor and composer. He was the longest-serving conductor of the Oslo Philharmonic, and he was the conductor at the Norwegian National Opera in the 1960s.

== Family and childhood ==
Odd Grüner-Hegge was the son of Christian Thorberg Grüner Hegge (1859–1918) and Olga Christensen (1869–1954). His father was a bank clerk and his mother was a painter and drawing artist. Among his siblings, Thorleif (1889–1979) became a psychologist at the University of Michigan, Rolf became a businessman, and Finn (1895–1962) became a violinist.

Grüner-Hegge married Sigrid Elena Feinsilber (1904–1977) in 1929, and then in 1944 Karen Welle (1914–2006), who was the daughter of the priest Ivar Welle. He was the father of the ballet dancer Karen Grüner-Hegge (born 1947).

As a child, Grüner-Hegge had a soprano voice, and he composed his first piece at the age of six. As a seven-year-old, he auditioned for Edvard Grieg, who in a letter to his mother expressed faith in the boy's musical talent, but urged caution and reminded her that the boy had to find time to play with his friends in addition to playing the piano.

== Education and debut ==
Grüner-Hegge studied piano with Fridtjof Backer-Grøndahl, composition with Otto Winter-Hjelm and Gustav Fredrik Lange, and conducting with Felix Weingartner. His debut as a composer took place in Oslo in 1917, together with his brother Finn Grüner-Hegge (1895–1962) on the violin and himself on the piano, although he did not debut as a pianist until 1918. When he made his debut as a conductor in 1927 in a piano concert with Elisabeth Reiss (1902–1970) and the Oslo Philharmonic, the composer Harald Sæverud wrote about him in Aftenposten:

Odd Grüner-Hegge went about his task with an energy that eventually took the life of his baton, and it was perhaps fortunate that he was able to discharge part of the Coriolan Overture, with which the concert opened.

From 1925 to 1929, he was also connected with Dagbladet as a music critic.

== Conductor ==
Starting in 1931, Grüner-Hegge shared the position of chief conductor of the Oslo Philharmonic with Olav Kielland. This continued until 1933, when the philharmonic switched to having a single conductor and Kielland received the job. Because Grüner-Hegge had not been informed about this, he voiced his disappointment in the newspapers, although he received a job as conductor at the National Theater and also appeared as a guest conductor with the Berlin Philharmonic. In 1946, Grüner-Hegge was back as the artistic director at the Oslo Philharmonic; he held this position until 1962, when, after a few years as the musical director and acting director in Kirsten Flagstad's absence due to illness, he became the full-time director of Norwegian National Opera, where he served until 1969.

Grüner-Hegge also appeared as a guest conductor in Budapest, Paris, the Hague, Hilversum, Copenhagen, Stockholm, and Gothenburg. He was a close friend of the composers Christian Sinding and Ludvig Irgens-Jensen, who were also his childhood friends. Grüner-Hegge conducted works by young composers such as Geirr Tveitt, Klaus Egge, Øistein Sommerfeldt, and Edvard Fliflet Bræin.

== Awards and positions ==
For several decades, Grüner-Hegge was a member of the Norwegian Composers Association and TONO. He received the Norwegian Musicians' Association badge of honor, the Harmony Music Society (Musikselskabet Harmonien) badge of honor, and the Oslo Philharmonic badge of honor, and he became a knight 1st class of the Order of St. Olav in 1959, in addition to becoming a knight of the Swedish Order of the Polar Star and the Danish Order of the Dannebrog. Grüner-Hegge was a Freemason and held the sixth degree in the Norwegian Order of Freemasons.

== Compositions ==
- Sonate for fiolin og klaver (Sonata for Violin and Piano, 1914)
- Suite for klaver (Suite for Piano, 1917)
- Trio for fiolin, cello og klaver (Trio for Violin, Cello, and Piano, 1919)
- Elegisk melodi for strykere (Elegiac Melody for Strings, 1943)
