= Ludvig Irgens-Jensen =

Norwegian composer

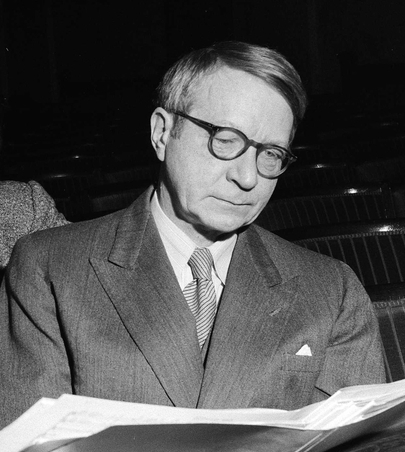
Ludvig Irgens-Jensen

Paul Ludvig Irgens-Jensen (13 April 1894 – 11 April 1969) was a Norwegian twentieth-century composer.

== Biography ==
Irgens-Jensen studied piano with Nils Larsen while a philology student at the University of Oslo. He began composing in 1920 and the radical nature of his work attracted some interest. In 1928, Irgens-Jensen submitted his Passacaglia for Orchestra to the International Schubert Competition to commemorate the 100th anniversary of Franz Schubert's death. The competition was eventually won by Kurt Atterberg's Symphony No. 6. Although Irgens-Jensen's work only received second prize in the Scandinavian Composers Division, the work was performed all over the world and helped Irgens-Jensen gain international fame.

In 1930, the composer achieved another great success with his choral symphonic work Heimferd, written to commemorate the 900th anniversary of the death of St. Olav II of Norway. This work won first prize in a composition competition and quickly became popular in Norway. Heimferd is now considered an important landmark in the history of Norwegian choral music.

During the Second World War, Irgens-Jensen composed several songs and orchestral works to patriotic texts; due to the restrictions imposed by the Nazis, these works had to be distributed anonymously and illegally. In 1945 Irgens-Jensen received a government grant that guaranteed him financial independence. In 1969 he died two days before his 75th birthday during a stay in Sicily.

== Musical Language ==
Ludvig Irgens-Jensen was an educated man who traveled and spoke multiple languages. He was aware of the latest European music trends. Initially, he was heavily influenced by French Impressionism and experimented with atonality in his early songs. Later, he adopted a tonally based style in the tradition of German late Romanticism. His music was perceived as "old Norwegian" in his homeland due to its polyphonic writing and preference for modal turns in their harmony. However, he rarely used elements from actual Norwegian folk music. His music was also characterized by wide-ranging, vocal melodic arcs and clear, lightened instrumentation.

Irgens-Jensen is one of the most important Norwegian composers of the interwar period. He had a strong influence on the younger generation, especially as a mediator of Central European musical culture. However, he resisted the post-war musical avant-garde, which caused his work to become outdated and forgotten. Since the 1970s, his works have been performed more often. His song cycle Japanischer Frühling (Japanese Spring) is regularly programmed in Scandinavia.

== Works ==
=== Stage music ===
- Driftekaren, Opera (1938)
- Le Retour, Opera (1947)
- Kong Baldevins Armring, Comic opera (1935)
- Robin Hood: spectacle lyrique, Incidental music (1945)

=== Choral music ===
- Cantates profanes, Oratorio (before 1930)
- Le Retour, Oratorio (1930)
- Heimferd, Oratorio (1930)
- Der Gott und die Bajadere, Oratorio (1932)

=== Orchestral Music ===
- Tema con variazioni (1925)
- Passacaglia (1927)
- Symphony No. 1 (1930)
- Kong Baldvines Arming, Suite (1935)
- Partita Sinfonica (1938)
- Pastorale religioso (1939)
- Symphony No. 2 in D minor (1942)
- Canto d'omaggio (1950)
- Japanischer Frühling (1957)
- Air (1959)

=== Chamber music ===
- Violin Sonata in B-flat (1923)
- Piano Quintet (1927)

== Discography (selected releases) ==
- Bournemouth Symphony Orchestra, Symphony in d minor; Air; Passacaglia (2011)
- Solveig Kringlebotn, To a Friend (2003)
- Bergen Philharmonic Orchestra, Ragnhild Heiland Sørensen, Eivind Aadland, Japanischer Frühling (2002)
- Trondheim Symphony Orchestra, Heimferd (1994)
- Oslo Philharmonic Orchestra, Ludvig Irgens-Jensen, Tema con Variazioni - Sinfonia in Re - Japanischer Frühling (1993)
- Oslo Philharmonic Orchestra, Ludvig Irgens-Jensen, Passacaglia & Partita Sinfonica · Sonata for Violin and piano (1988)
