= 1804 in music =

This is a list of music-related events in 1804.

== Events ==
- January 1 – Johann Nepomuk Hummel's Concerto for trumpet and orchestra receives its première in Vienna, in the presence of Nicholas II, Prince Esterházy.
- January 23 – François-Adrien Boieldieu becomes musical director at the court of Tsar Alexander I of Russia.
- February 20 – Giovanni Paisiello is appointed Maestro di Cappella at Naples.
- April 22 – Twelve-year-old Gioachino Rossini gives a concert at Imola.
- May 8 – Seventeen-year-old Carl Maria von Weber becomes Kapellmeister at Breslau in Silesia.
- May 14 – Napoleon proclaims himself emperor, causing Beethoven to tear up the title page of his recently completed Symphony No. 3 and rename it the Eroica.
- September 18 – Composer Muzio Clementi marries 19-year-old pianist Caroline Lehmann, the daughter of Johann Georg Lehmann, director of the Royal Opera, Berlin. There is a 33-year age gap between bride and groom.
- Nicolas Dalayrac is awarded the Légion d'honneur.

== Classical music ==
- Ludwig van Beethoven
  - Piano Sonata No. 22 in F major
  - Piano Sonata No. 23, Op.57
  - Symphony No. 2 (published; composed 1801–02)
  - Triple Concerto, Op.56
  - Gedenke mein!, WoO 130
- Isabella Colbran – Cavatina di partenza
- Jan Ladislav Dussek – Fantasia and Fugue for piano
- Anton Eberl – Symphony in D minor, Op. 34
- Johann Nepomuk Hummel
  - Rondo in E-flat major, Op. 11
  - Variations for piano Op. 15
  - Rondo-Fantasie, Op. 19
  - Mass in E-flat major, Op. 80
- Leopold Kozeluch – Three Piano Sonatas
- Niccolo Paganini – Divertimenti Carnevaleschi
- Ferdinand Ries – Piano sonata in A minor, Op. 1 No. 2
- Gioachino Rossini – 6 Sonate a quattro
- Antonio Salieri – Requiem in C minor
- Louis Spohr – Concerto for Violin No. 2 in D minor, Op. 2
- Carl Maria von Weber
  - 6 Variations sur l'air de Naga de 'Samori', Op.6
  - 6 Lieder, Op. 30
  - Turandot, Op.37 (incidental music for Schiller's production)
- Joseph Wölfl – Symphony in C major, Op. 41

== Opera ==
- Ludwig van Beethoven – Fidelio, Op.72 (composed; premiered 1805)
- François-Adrien Boieldieu – Aline, reine de Golconde
- Pierre Gaveaux – Le Mariage inattendu
- Adalbert Gyrowetz – Selico
- Ferdinando Paer – Leonora
- Gaspare Spontini – Milton
- Georg Joseph Vogler – Samori

== Births ==
- January 24 – Delphine de Girardin, lyricist and writer (died 1855)
- January 25 – Antoni Edward Odyniec, librettist and writer (died 1885)
- February 5 – Johan Ludvig Runeberg, lyricist and poet (died 1877)
- March 14 – Johann Strauss I, Austrian composer (d. 1849)
- March 30 – Salomon Sulzer, Austrian Jewish composer (d. 1890)
- April 15 – Otto Friedrich Gruppe, lyricist and poet (died 1876)
- May 13 – Aleksey Khomyakov, lyricist and philosopher (died 1860)
- May 31 – Louise Farrenc, born Jeanne-Louise Dumont, French pianist and composer (d. 1875)
- June 1 – Mikhail Glinka, Russian composer (d. 1857)
- June 13 – Gustave de Wailly, librettist and writer (died 1878)
- June 21 – Johann Gabriel Seidl, librettist and archeologist (died 1875)
- July 14 – Julius Schuberth, German author and publisher, founder of Schuberth & Co. (d. 1875)
- July 17 – Carl Ferdinand Becker, music collector and musician (died 1877)
- August 19 – Christina Enbom, Swedish operatic soprano (d. 1880)
- September 8 – Eduard Mörike, lyricist and poet (died 1875)
- October 1 – Eduard Sobolewski, Polish-American violinist, composer and conductor (may have been born in 1808; d. 1872)
- October 18
  - Alexandre Charles Fessy, composer and musician (died 1856)
  - Joseph-Bernard Rosier, librettist and playwright (died 1880)
- November 27 – Sir Julius Benedict, German-born conductor and composer (d. 1885)
- date unknown – Ferdinand Giovanni Schediwy, Czech-born organist, conductor and composer (d. 1877)

== Deaths ==
- March 29 (or 30) – Ivan Khandoshkin, violinist and composer (b. 1747)
- June 16 – Johann Adam Hiller, conductor, composer and music writer (b. 1728)
- July 17 – Christian Ernst Graf, composer and kapellmeister (born 1723)
- August 24 – Valentin Adamberger, operatic tenor (b. 1740)
- November 5 – Maria Anna Adamberger, actress and singer, wife of Valentin Adamberger (b. 1752)
- November 19 – Pietro Guglielmi, composer (b. 1728)
- date unknown
  - Gioacchino Cocchi, opera composer (b.c.1720)
  - Marie Louise Marcadet, actress and singer (b. 1758)
  - Lorenzo Quaglio, stage designer (b. 1730)
  - Giovanni Valentini, composer, poet and painter (b. c. 1730)
  - Christian Felix Weisse, lyricist and writer (born 1726)
  - Abraham Wood, early American composer (b. 1752)
