= Aldo Ceccato =

Italian conductor (born 1934)

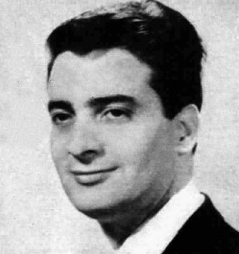
- Ceccato in 1968

Background information
- Born: 18 February 1934 (age 91); Milan, Italy
- Occupation: Conductor
- Labels: Hyperion
- Formerly of: Detroit Symphony Orchestra; Philharmonisches Staatsorchester Hamburg; Bergen Philharmonic Orchestra

Aldo Ceccato (born 18 February 1934) is an Italian conductor.

== Biography ==
Ceccato was born in Milan. He worked as assistant to Sergiu Celibidache and was music director of the Detroit Symphony Orchestra from 1973 until 1977. From 1976 until 1982, he was music director of the Hamburg Philharmonic. He was also music director of the Bergen Philharmonic Orchestra from 1985 until 1990. He is the son-in-law of conductor Victor de Sabata and has made a recording of de Sabata's compositions for the Hyperion record label. In 1971, he recorded Donizetti's Maria Stuarda and Verdi's La traviata, both with Beverly Sills.

Cultural offices
Preceded by Karsten Andersen	Principal Conductors, Bergen Philharmonic Orchestra; 1985–1990	Succeeded by Dmitri Kitajenko
Preceded by Jesús López-Cobos	Principal Conductors, Orquesta Nacional de España; 1991–1994	Succeeded by Josep Pons
Preceded by Otakar Trhlík	Principal Conductors, Brno Philharmonic Orchestra; 1997–2000	Succeeded by Petr Altrichter
