= Bergen Philharmonic Orchestra =

Orchestra based in Bergen, Norway

- Orchestra
- Former name: Det Musicalske Selskab; Musikselskabet Harmonien
- Founded: 1765
- Location: Bergen, Norway
- Concert hall: Grieg Hall
- Principal conductor: Tabita Berglund (designate, effective autumn 2027)
- Website: Official website

The Bergen Philharmonic Orchestra (Norwegian: Bergen filharmoniske orkester) is a Norwegian orchestra based in Bergen. Its principal concert venue is the Grieg Hall.

== History ==
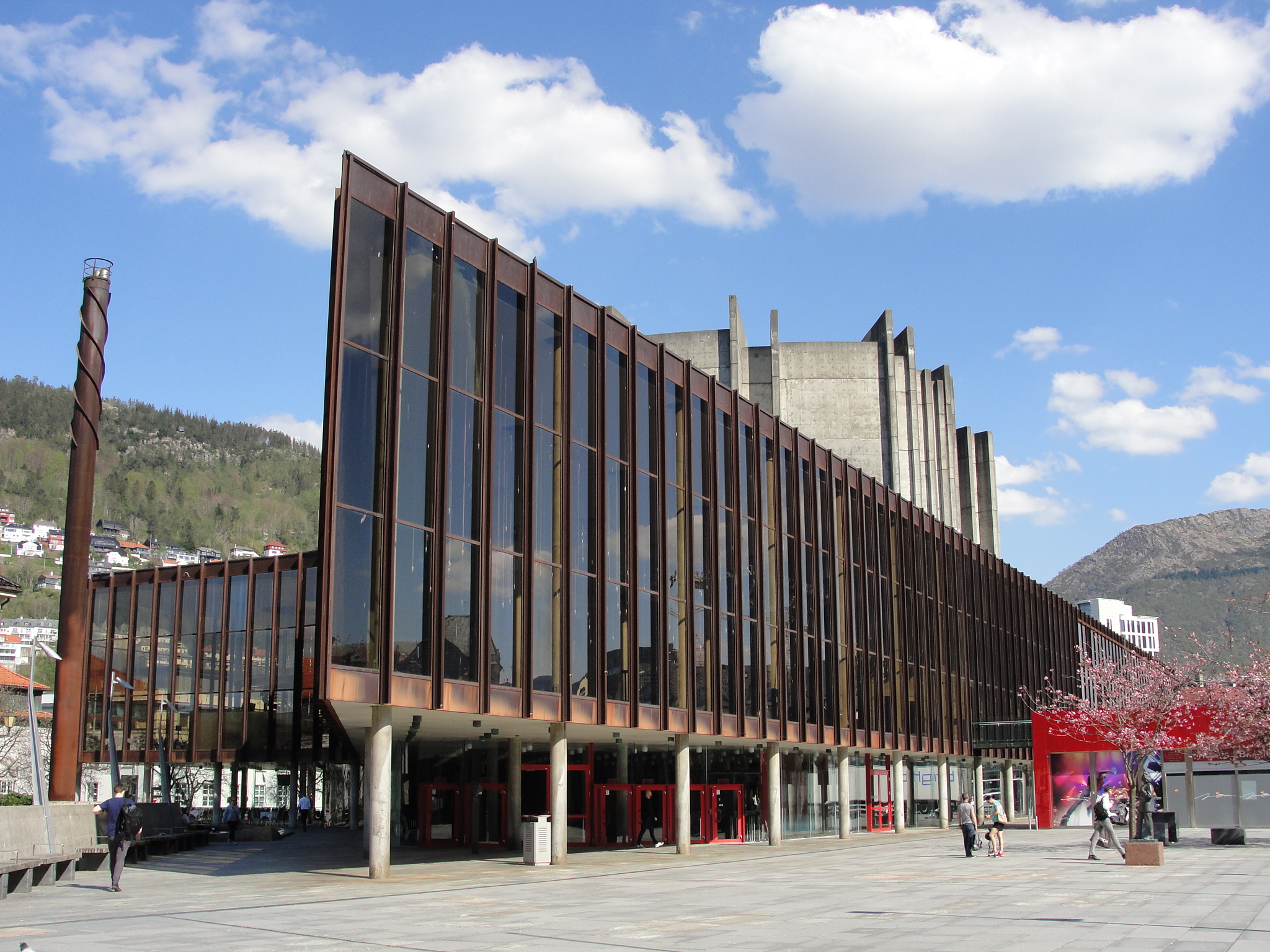
The Grieg Hall in May, 2016

Established in 1765 under the name Det Musicalske Selskab (The Musical Society), it later changed its name to Musikselskabet Harmonien. Bergen citizens often refer to the ensemble as "Harmonien" (the Harmony).

After World War I, there was strong interest in the major Norwegian cities of Bergen and Kristiania (later Oslo) in having larger orchestras. In 1919, the orchestra in Bergen was reorganized to employ 40 professional full-time musicians. As of 2015, the orchestra has 101 musicians.

The orchestra has had a long tradition of playing contemporary music. Ludwig van Beethoven's second symphony was performed in Bergen in the year it was published, 1804, even before it was performed in Berlin. Bergen-born composer Edvard Grieg had close ties with the orchestra, and was artistic director from 1880 to 1882. He also bequeathed a portion of his estate to a fund which continues to provide financial support for the orchestra. Other composers have served as principal conductor of the orchestra, including Arvid Fladmoe, Johan Halvorsen, Iver Holter, Richard Henneberg, Olav Kielland and Per Winge. Composer Harald Sæverud was frequently invited to conduct his own works, and the orchestra continues to commission and perform new compositions on a regular basis. Other composers who have conducted their own works with the orchestra include Aaron Copland, Karl Nielsen, Jean Sibelius, Witold Lutosławski, Lukas Foss, and Krzysztof Penderecki. In 1953, the Festspillene i Bergen was started and Leopold Stokowski was contracted to conduct the orchestra. Other conductors at the Bergen Festival have included Eugene Ormandy and Sir Thomas Beecham.

Andrew Litton became principal conductor in 2003 and artistic director in 2005. In 2002, the orchestra began to record the complete orchestral works of Edvard Grieg, the first Norwegian orchestra to do so. Norwegian conductor Ole Kristian Ruud and the orchestra recorded the final of the 7 CDs for BIS, in 2005. Litton now has the title of conductor laureate with the orchestra.

The orchestra's most recent chief conductor was Edward Gardner, beginning in 2015. In January 2017. the orchestra announced the extension of Gardner's contract in Bergen through 2021. In September 2019, the orchestra further extended Gardner's contract through 2023. In June 2021, the orchestra announced a 1-year extension of Gardner's contract through July 2024. In November 2021, the orchestra announced the appointment of Sir Mark Elder as its next principal guest conductor, effective 1 August 2022, with an initial contract of three years through 31 July 2025. Gardner concluded his tenure as chief conductor at the close of the 2023–2024 season, at which time the orchestra named him its æresdirigent (honorary conductor).

In December 2020, Tabita Berglund, a former deputy cellist with the orchestra, first guest-conducted the orchestra in a quarantined concert. She made her first subscription series guest-conducting appearance with the orchestra in September 2025. In March 2026, the orchestra announced the appointment of Berglund as its next chief conductor, effective with the 2027–2028 season, with an initial contract of four seasons. She is to hold the title of chief conductor-designate in the 2026–2027 season. Berglund is the first female conductor to be named chief conductor of the Bergen Philharmonic.

Many members of the orchestra teach at the Grieg Academy of Music, which is a music conservatory within the University of Bergen.

== Chief conductors ==
- Samuel Lind (1765–1769)
- Benjamin Ohle (1769–1770)
- Niels Haslund (1770–1785)
- Ole Pedersen Rødder (1785–1805)
- J. Hindrich Paulsen (1805–1806, 1809–1820)
- Mathias Lundholm (1820–1827)
- Ferdinand Giovanni Schediwy (1827–1844)
- Ferdinand August Rojahn (1856–1859)
- Otto Lübert (1855–1856)
- Ferdinand A. Rojahn (1856–1859)
- August Fries (1859–1862, 1864–1873)
- Amadeus Wolfgang Maczewsky (1862–1864)
- Richard Henneberg (1873–1875)
- Adolf Blomberg (1875–1878)
- Hermann Levi (1879–1880)
- Edvard Grieg (1880–1882)
- Iver Holter (1882–1886)
- Per Winge (1886–1888)
- Georg Washington Magnus (1892–1893)
- Johan Halvorsen (1893–1898)
- Christian Danning (1899–1901, 1902–1905)
- Harald Heide (1907–1948)
- Olav Kielland (1948–1952)
- Carl von Garaguly (1952–1958)
- Arvid Fladmoe (1958–1961)
- Karsten Andersen (1964–1985)
- Aldo Ceccato (1985–1990)
- Dmitri Kitajenko (1990–1998)
- Simone Young (1998–2002)
- Andrew Litton (2003–2015)
- Edward Gardner (2015–2024)
- Tabita Berglund (designate, effective autumn 2027)

== Bergen Philharmonic Orchestra timeline ==
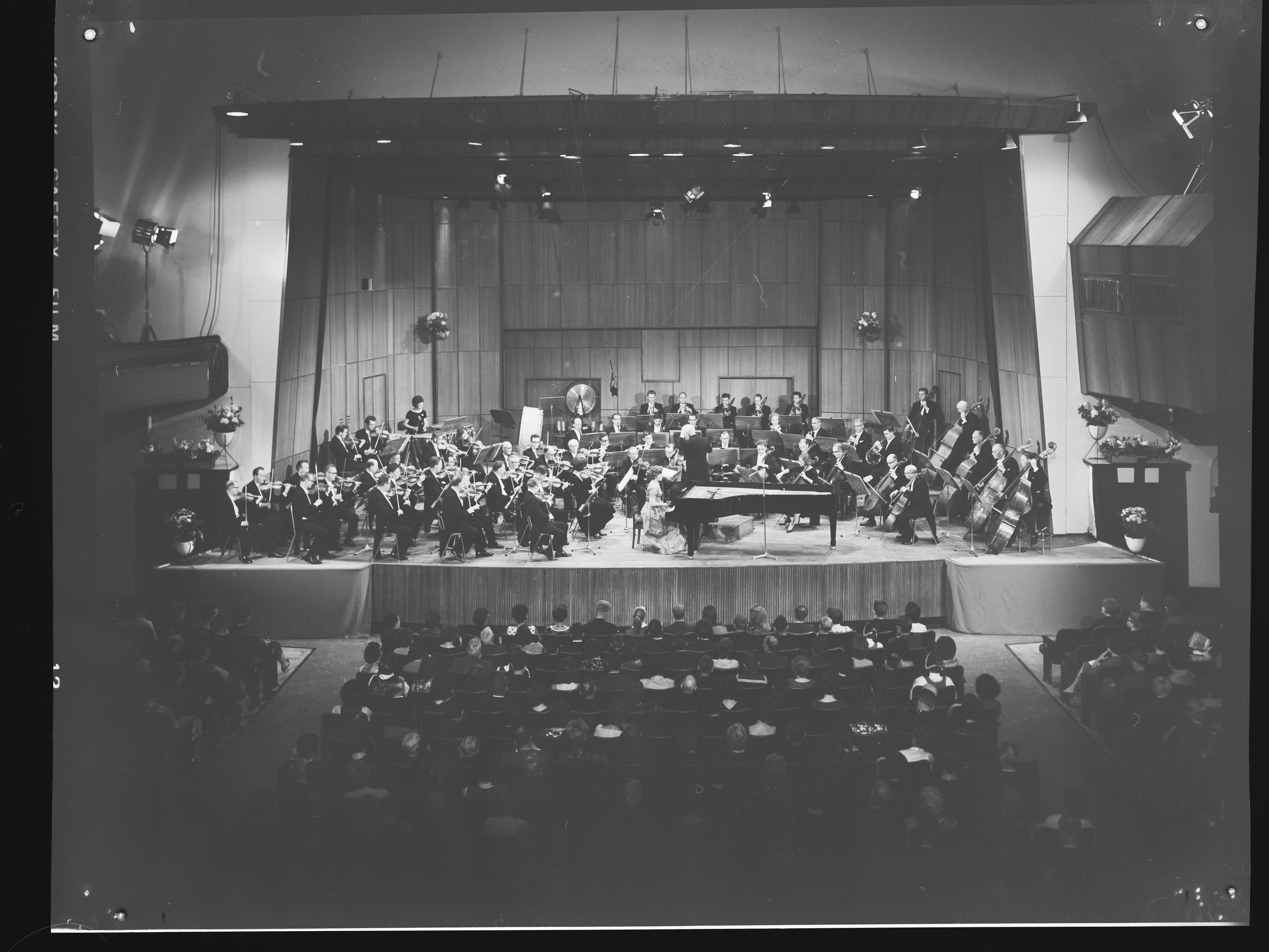
Bergen Philharmonic Orchestra (1964)

- 1765 – Det Musicalske Selskab (The Musical Society) established
- 1769 – Society renamed Det Harmoniske Selskab (The Harmonic Society)
- 1770 – Society has over 30 members, one-third are singers. Thursday set as concert day.
- 1771 – Fire destroys concert locale.
- 1773 – Society rents Altona as concert locale (until 1807).
- 1774 – Society has 20 instrumentalists, mirroring Joseph Haydn's Esterhazy orchestra of 1766 to 1790
- 1783 – Society engages Ole Rødder as a paid violinist.
- 1785 – Society's orchestra has 25 members.
- 1799 – Johan Henrich Poulson, student of Giovanni Battista Viotti leads orchestra.
- 1811 – Society buys its own building on King Oscar's street. Orchestra has c. 30 members.
- 1812 – Society's members give free instruction to young musicians, some of whom play in the orchestra.
- 1818 – violinist Ole Bull begins playing in the orchestra at age 8.
- 1819 – violinist Ole Bull performs Ignaz Pleyel concerto with orchestra.
- 1820 – Swede Mathias Lundholm becomes orchestra's conductor.
- 1827 – Prague-born Ferdinand Giovanni Schediwy named conductor. Haydn, Mozart and Beethoven dominate orchestra's repertoire.
- 1839 – As a promotion, the society advertises that each man can bring two women to concerts.
- 1855 – Otto Lübbert becomes musical leader.
- 1856 – Society renamed Musikselskabet Harmonien. Ferdinand A. Rojahn named orchestra leader. First part of Haydn's "Creation" performed after over 100 rehearsals.
- 1859 – August Fries named conductor.
- 1862 – Musicians from Harmonien assist the 18-year-old Edvard Grieg with his first concert in his home city of Bergen after his studies in Leipzig. Amadeus Wolfgang Maczewsky becomes orchestra leader.
- 1863 – Edvard Grieg performs a Beethoven sonata with Maczewsky on a Society concert.
- 1865 – August Fries leads Grieg's Symphony in C Minor.
- 1866 – Felix Mendelssohn's Elijah performed with Nina Hagerup as a soloist.
- 1870 – Orchestra has 41 permanent members
- 1871 – Johan Svendsen's Symphony in D Major is played for the first time in Bergen.
- 1873 – Richard Henneberg hired as conductor.
- 1875 – German Adolf Blomberg becomes Kapellmeister.
- 1879 – Hermann Levi hired as conductor after Grieg declines offer.
- 1880 – Edvard Grieg becomes artistic director.
- 1881 – Orchestra performs Grieg's A minor Piano Concerto with Alice Lindberg as soloist.
- 1882 – Composer Iver Holter becomes conductor.
- 1883 – Orchestra premieres Grieg's Landkjenning
- 1885 – Johan Halvorsen hired as concertmaster
- 1886 – Per Winge named conductor.
- 1889 – No concerts.
- 1893 – Johan Halvorsen becomes conductor. During his six seasons as conductor, he introduces music of Glinka, Delibes, Dvořák, Humperdinck and Sibelius to Bergensers.
- 1907 – Death of Edvard Grieg.
- 1908 – Harald Heide becomes principal conductor. "Edvard Grieg's Fund" established.
- 1915 – Orchestra celebrates 150th season. First concert in Koncert-Palæet.
- 1919 – Orchestra reorganized and employs 40 full-time musicians.
- 1920–21 – Jean Sibelius conducts his own works: Symphony No. 2, The Swan of Tuonela and Finlandia
- 1923–24 – Carl Nielsen conducts his own works, including The Four Temperaments. Orchestra premieres Harald Sæverud Symphony No. 2.
- 1924–25 – Pierre Monteux guest conducts.
- 1925–26 – Orchestra celebrates its 160th season.
- 1927–28 – First radio broadcasts of orchestra's concerts.
- 1930–31 – Marian Anderson solos with orchestra three years before her London debut. Kurt Atterberg conducts his own Symphony Nr. 6.
- 1931–32 – Orchestra premieres Harald Sæverud Symphony No. 3.
- 1934–35 – Karol Szymanowski featured as soloist in his own Sinfonia Concertante for piano and orchestra.
- 1938 – First "Young Soloists Concert."
- 1939–40 – Orchestra holds first "Worker's Concert"
- 1941 – At the orchestra's 175-year jubilee concert, a Nazi mob protests against Ernst Glaser, a Jew who was scheduled to perform as soloist on Ole Bull's violin. He is whisked away by rescuers and the concert is cancelled after the first number.
- 1942–43 – Orchestra gives five memorial concerts for Edvard Grieg's 100-year jubilee.
- 1943 – Air-raid warning interrupts season opening concert.
- 1944–45 – Concert time changed to 6:00 p.m. because of 9:00 curfew. Orchestra holds benefit concert for victims of bombing in Laksevåg.
- 1946–47 – Orchestra premieres Harald Sæverud Oboe Concerto. School concert series begins.
- 1947–48 – Site for Grieg Hall selected. Haakon B. Wallem donates one million Norwegian Kroner to building fund.
- 1948 – Olav Kielland becomes principal conductor.
- 1951 – Orchestra employs 54 full-time musicians.
- 1952–53 – Carl von Garaguly named artistic director.
- 1953 – Bergen International Festival begins. Leopold Stokowski conducts.
- 1953–54 – Harmonien's fund for New Music established.
- 1954–55 – Eugene Ormandy guest conducts.
- 1956–57 – Orchestra premieres Egil Hovland Symphony No. 2.
- 1957–58 – Orchestra premieres Geirr Tveitt Brudlaupssuiten.
- 1958–59 – Arvid Fladmoe becomes artistic director. Orchestra employs 60 full-time musicians.
- 1961–62 – Pierre Monteux guest conducts.
- 1962–63 – Orchestra has first international tour, to Copenhagen, Denmark.
- 1964 – Karsten Andersen becomes principal conductor
- 1966 – Tour to the U. S. A. under the name "Norwegian Festival Orchestra." Orchestra celebrates 200th season. Karsten Andersen named artistic director.
- 1968 – King Olav V of Norway lays cornerstone of the Grieg Hall.
- 1969–70 – Orchestra premieres Ragnar Søderlind Polaris.
- 1970–71 – Lukas Foss conducts Rileys in C. Orchestra tours England.
- 1972–73 – Orchestra tours Germany. Orchestra premieres Magnar Åm Bøn.
- 1974–75 – Orchestra premieres Allan Pettersson Symphony No. 11
- 1975–76 – Aaron Copland conducts his own works.
- 1976–77 – Orchestra premieres Ketil Hvoslef Cello Concerto.
- 1978 – Orchestra moves to the Grieg Hall.
- 1979–80 – Orchestra tours Tallinn, Moscow and Leningrad. Antal Doráti guest conducts.
- 1980–81 – Witold Lutosławski conducts his own works. Dmitri Kitajenko conducts orchestra for first time. Orchestra employs 72 full-time musicians.
- 1982–83 – Krzysztof Penderecki conducts his own works. Aldo Ceccato conducts orchestra for first time.
- 1984–85 – Orchestra tours Belgium and France.
- 1985 – Aldo Ceccato becomes principal conductor
- 1986 – Name changed to Bergen Filharmoniske Orkester. Orchestra employs 83 full-time musicians.
- 1989 – Orchestra employs 89 full-time musicians.
- 1990 – Dmitri Kitajenko becomes principal conductor
- 1997 – Lorentz Reitan becomes managing director
- 1998 – Simone Young becomes principal conductor
- 2000 – Krzysztof Penderecki and Luciano Berio each conduct their own works.
- 2002 – Orchestra tours Austria (Bregenz, Salzburg, Vienna and Graz) and Croatia (Zagreb) with Spanish conductor Rafael Frühbeck de Burgos
- 2003 – Andrew Litton becomes principal conductor, takes orchestra on tour to Spain.
- 2005 – Andrew Litton named artistic director. Orchestra celebrates its 240th season. Litton leads European tour with concerts in Udine, Ljubljana, Zagreb, Rome, Vienna and Innsbruck.
- 2006 – Orchestra roster increased to 98 musicians. Orchestra goes on strike during Bergen International Festival. Sten Cranner becomes managing director.
- 2007 – Touring to the Concertgebouw (Amsterdam), Birmingham Symphony Hall and Royal Albert Hall, PROMS (London), with Boris Berezovsky as piano-soloist. 12-concert tour of the US including Carnegie Hall, New York. Soloist: André Watts, piano.
- 2008 – Concert at Musikverein, Vienna. Soloist Johannes Moser, cello. Three-concert tour of Poland, Estonia and Sweden with soloist Nikolaj Znaider, violin.

== Bergen Philharmonic Orchestra partial discography ==
BIS records:

- Peter Tchaikovsky and Alexander Glazunov: Violin Concertos. Vadim Gluzman, violin. Andrew Litton, conductor
- Peter Tchaikovsky: Suites from Swan Lake, The Sleeping Beauty, The Nutcracker. Neeme Järvi, conductor
- Edvard Grieg: The Complete Orchestral Music. BIS-CD-1740/42 (8cds). Ole Kristian Ruud, conductor
- Kalevi Aho – Concerto for Contrabassoon and Orchestra. Lewis Lipnick, contrabassoon. Andrew Litton, conductor. BIS-CD-1574. 2007
- Sergei Prokofiev – Romeo and Juliet, Andrew Litton, conductor. BIS-SACD-
- Edvard Grieg – Olav Trygvason, Orchestral Songs. Ole Kristian Ruud, conductor, Solveig Kringelborn, soprano, Ingebjørg Kosmo, mezzo-soprano, Trond Halstein Moe baritone, Marita Solberg, soprano, Bergen Philharmonic Choir, Kor Vest, Voci Nobili. 2006. BIS-SACD-1531
- Edvard Grieg – Peer Gynt Suites. Ole Kristian Ruud, conductor. 2006. BIS-SACD-1591
- Edvard Grieg – Holberg Suite, Music for Strings. Ole Kristian Ruud, conductor. 2005. BIS-SACD-1491
- Edvard Grieg – Peer Gynt (The Complete Incidental Music) (May 2005) SACD-1441/42
- Arvo Pärt – Spiegel im Spiegel (April 2005) CD-1434
- Edvard Grieg – Sigurd Jorsalfar (March 2004 SACD-1391
- Edvard Grieg – Orchestral Dances (May 2003) SACD-1291
- Edvard Grieg – Piano Concerto (February 2003) SACD-1191
- Benjamin Britten – The Young Person's Guide to the Orchestra (January 1989) CD-420
- Robert Schumann – Symphonies No. 3 & No. 4, re-orchestrated by Gustav Mahler (January 1988) CD-394
- Robert Schumann – Symphonies No. 1 & No. 2, re-orchestrated by Gustav Mahler (January 1987) CD-361
- Eduard Tubin – Symphony No. 4 (January 1986) CD-227, also available in a compilation of the Tubin symphonies, CD-1402/04

Hyperion:

- Eyvind Alnæs and Christian Sinding: Piano Concertos. Piers Lane, piano. Andrew Litton, conductor. 2007. Hyperion CDA67555

Chandos:

- Nikolai Rimsky-Korsakov – Symphony No. 1; Symphony No. 2 "Antar"; Symphony No. 3; Capriccio espagnol; Russian Easter Overture; Piano Concerto; Sadko. Geoffrey Tozer (piano), Bergen Philharmonic Orchestra, Chandos 6613 CD
- Brahms – Symphonies NOS 1 AND 3; Bergen Philharmonic Orchestra, Chandos 5236
- Brahms – Symphonies NOS 2 AND 4; Bergen Philharmonic Orchestra, Chandos 5248
- Brahms – Ein deutsches Requiem; Bergen Philharmonic Orchestra, Chandos 5271
- Strauss – Salome; Bergen Philharmonic Orchestra, Chandos 5356(2)

Nkf:

- Bull: Herdgirl's Sunday, Bergen Symphony Orchestra with Arve Tellefsen. Conducted by Karsten Andersen (1995) ASIN: B0000044TC

Simax:

- Ludvig Irgens-Jensen – Japanischer Frühling; Passacaglia; Pastorale religioso; Canto d'omaggio, Bergen Philharmonic Orchestra, Ragnhild Heiland Sorensen (soprano), Eivind Aadland (conductor) Simax 1164 CD

Virgin Classics:

- Boléro: French & Russian Orchestral Favorites, Dmitri Kitajenko (conductor) ASIN: B000059LOF
- Classical Dreams: Music to Inspire; Bergen Philharmonic Orchestra, Bournemouth Sinfonietta, et al. ASIN: B00005Q467
- Grieg: Piano Concerto – Sonata Op. 7, Lyric Pieces, Opp. 43, 54 & 65, Leif Ove Andsnes (piano) #61745 (2000) ASIN: B00004LCAV
- Grieg: Symphonic Dances Op64; Funeral March in Memory of Richard Nordraak, Dmitri Kitajenko (conductor) (2000) ASIN: B000026CIK

Decca:

- Grieg: Symphony in c minor, Karsten Andersen (conductor), Decca SXDL 7537

Other:
