= Piano Sonata No. 22 (Beethoven) =

1804 composition by Beethoven

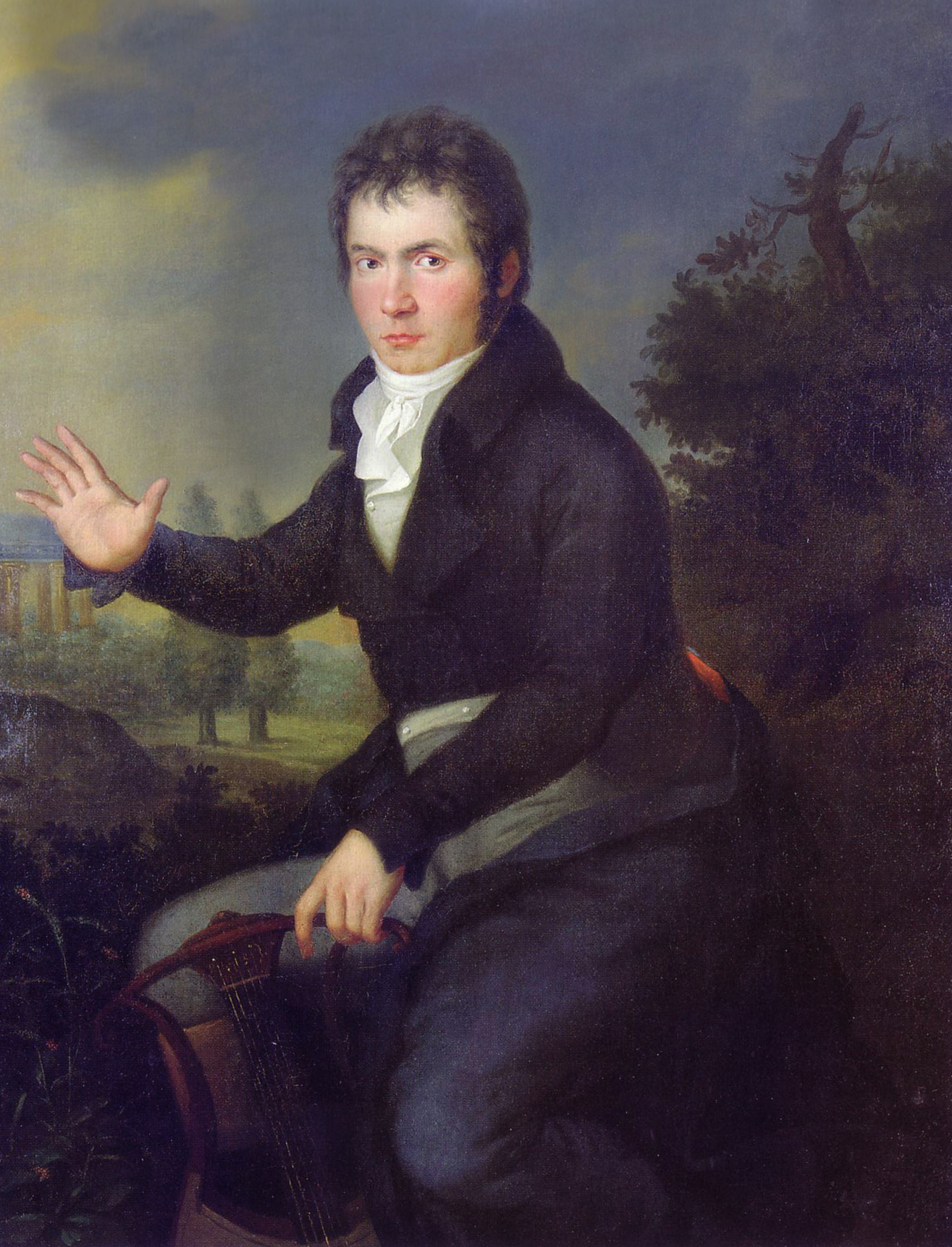
Beethoven, c. 1804–1805 by Joseph Willibrord Mähler

I. In tempo d'un menuetto

II. Allegretto – Più allegro
Played by Artur Schnabel in 1932

Ludwig van Beethoven's Piano Sonata No. 22 in F major, Op. 54, was written in 1804. It is contemporary to the first sketches of the Symphony No. 5 in C minor. It is one of Beethoven's lesser known sonatas, overshadowed by its widely known neighbours, the Waldstein and the Appassionata.

== Analysis ==
The sonata consists of just two movements:

=== I. In tempo d'un menuetto ===
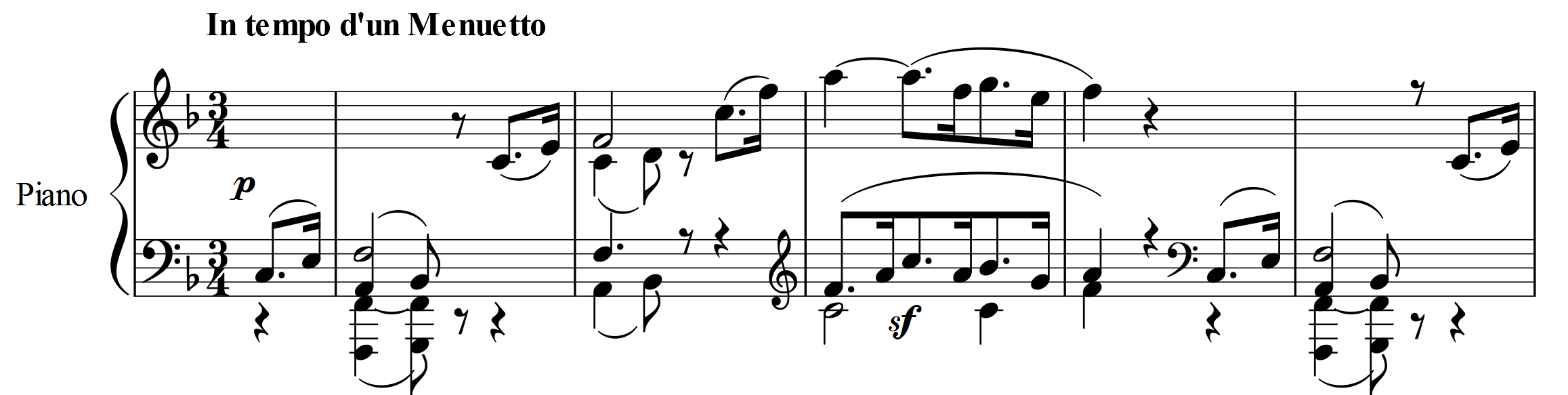

Beethoven skips the opening and slow movements and moves on to a minuet in 3/4 time, with a modulating trio. Anton Kuerti refers to this piece as a parody of uncreative composers, while András Schiff refers to it as portraying "Beauty and the Beast". The first theme is written in a rigidly classical style with repetitive phrases that are a caricature of elegance, while the second consists of a bombastic canon in octaves. The movement gradually increases in activity when it garners variations for its main theme. This first movement is in A–B–A–B–A form where A and B are strongly contrasted themes. Theme A is of minuet dance type in F major that one might find in Joseph Haydn. In contrast, theme B, the trio, is a succession of forte triplets in C major that are played by both hands staccato or legato; the triplets are in octaves (and later in sixths) and with a dialogue between the left and right hands and with many sforzandi to interrupt the meter. The A-section repeats in a whole, with a slight variation. Then the B, the trio section, reappears, this time in the tonic key of F major and of considerably shorter length. The opening A-theme reappears with more ornaments. After an extended group of trills, there is a brief coda.

=== II. Allegretto – Più allegro ===
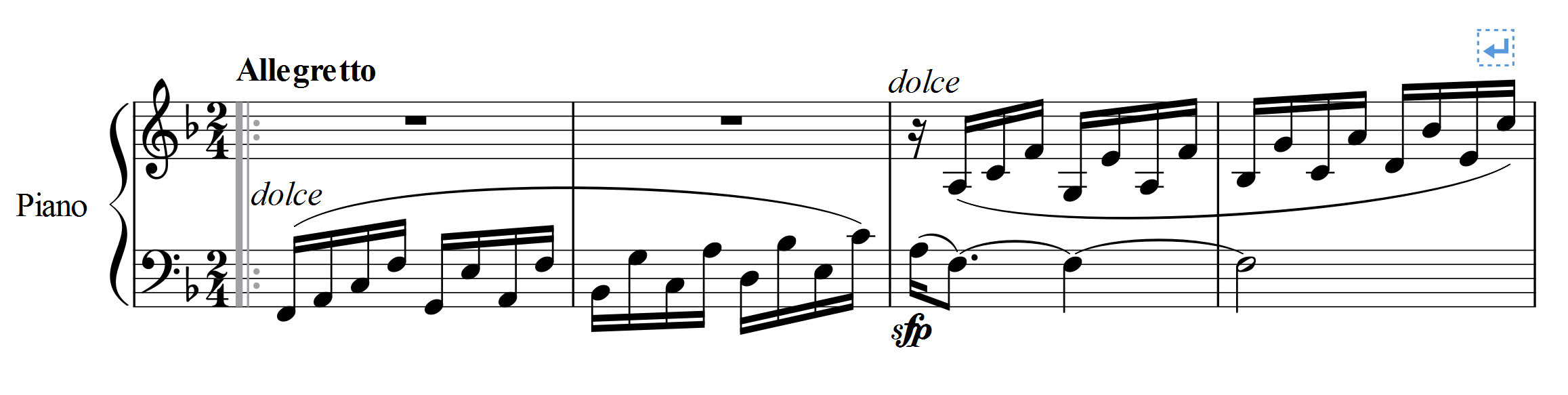

The finale, again in F major, is a cheerful moto perpetuo sonata form movement in 2/4 time with a monothematic exposition. This is shown in the piece, as the main melody has a non-stop continuous, sixteenth-note pattern that does not stop for even a second in this piece. The exposition, contains only one brief theme as it is written above. It starts on F major and modulates to C major, which is the key that ends the exposition. The development is long and extended. It starts on A major and modulates to many different keys, as it passes through a great climax and ends in the tonic key, when the retransition is heard and the development section ends. The recapitulation starts in the tonic like the exposition. However, instead of being in F major and C major, this time the theme modulates through more keys and is more extended. The recapitulation ends in F minor, the parallel minor of the tonic, in which bouncy but suspenseful syncopated notes are heard between both hands. The piece becomes more agitated in the faster coda, in F major, keeping a forward motion till the end.

=== General analysis ===
The Sonata is remarkable in its concision, a precursor in some ways to the Sonata in E major, Opus 109. The two movements present opposite faces on many levels:

- In tempo: the first movement is relaxed, the second, agitated.
- In meter: the first movement is in triple time, the second, double time.
- In rhetoric: the first movement is improvisatory and wandering in its unfolding, the second is a relentless moto perpetuo.
- In thematic material: the first movement develops two distinct themes, the second develops one thematic idea.
- In harmonic development: the first movement follows a classic tonic/dominant schema, the second includes abrupt harmonic shifts.

Donald Tovey writes:

...the whole work is profoundly humorous, with a humour that lies with the composer rather than with the childlike character portrayed by the music. No biographical details are known as to whether Beethoven thought of any person or household divinity in connection with this sonata; but its material is childlike, or even dog-like, and those who best understand children and dogs have the best chance of enjoying an adequate reading of this music; laughing with, but not at its animal spirits; following in strenuous earnest its indefatigable pursuit of its game whether that be its own tail or something more remote and elusive; and worthily requiting the wistful affection that is shown so insistently in the first movement and even in one long backward glance during the perpetuum mobile of the finale.

— Donald Tovey, Notes on the Associated Board of the Royal Schools of Music edition
