= Carl von Garaguly =

Hungarian violinist and conductor

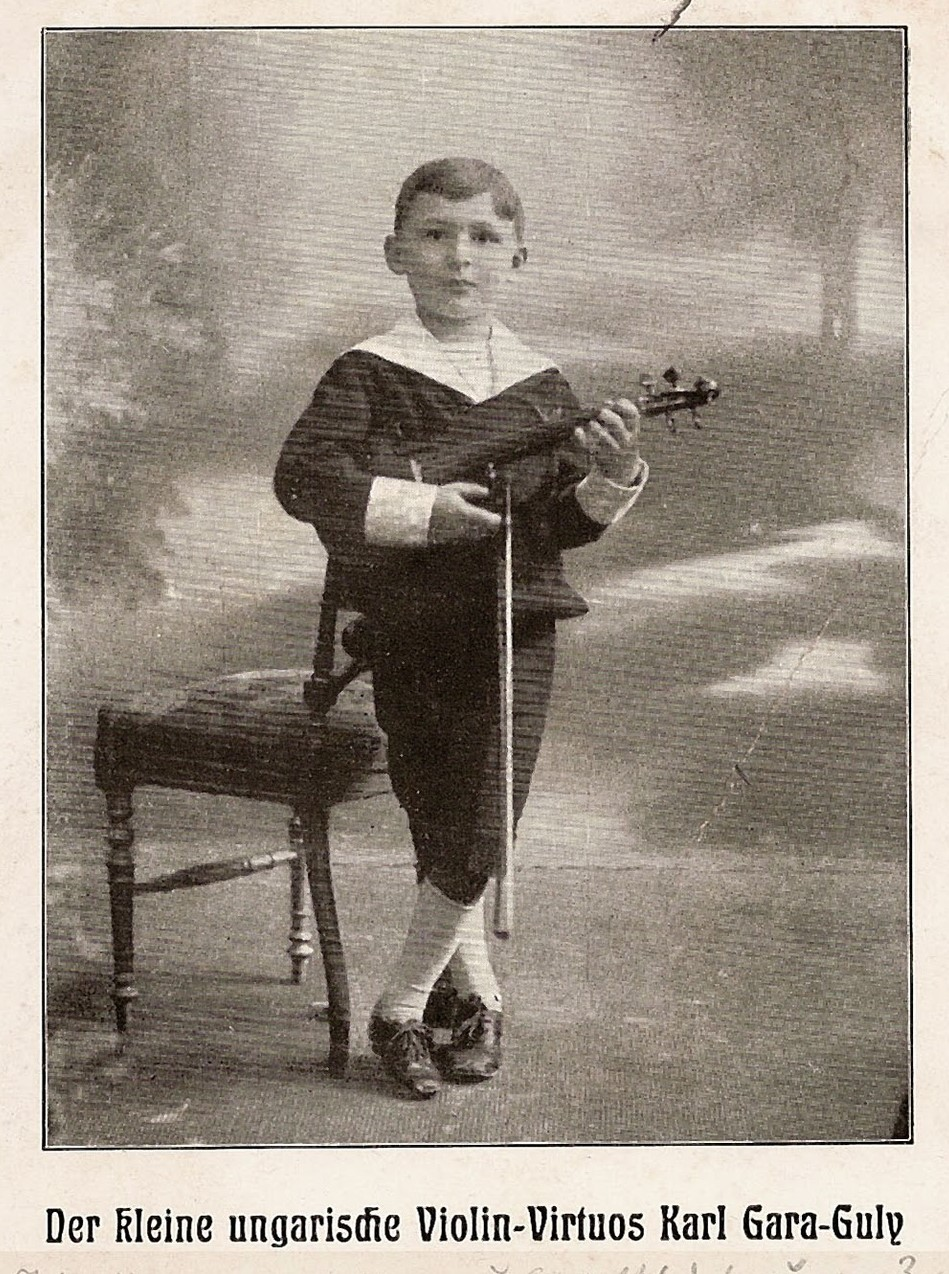
Karl Gara-Guly at the age of six or seven

Carl von Garaguly (28 December 1900 – 18 October 1984), also known as Carl Garaguly, was a Hungarian violinist and conductor who spent much of his working life in Scandinavia. He was born in Budapest, and worked many years in Gothenburg and Stockholm, Sweden, both as violinist and as a conductor.

== Life and career ==
Garaguly was a child prodigy, performing in public from the age of 6, having received his first violin lessons from his father. By the age of 10 he was undertaking concert tours.

He studied violin with Jenő Hubay at the Hungarian State Academy in 1907–08, and with Henri Marteau at the Berlin High School for Music from 1914 to 1916, and was a member of the Marteau Society. Aged 17 he became the assistant deputy leader of the Berlin Philharmonic Orchestra. During war service he made concert tours for the Red Cross before teaching for a time at the Conservatory of Arad, Transylvania.

Garaguly moved to Sweden in 1923 and from that year until 1930 he was the leader of the Gothenburg Symphony Orchestra, and also first violin of the Gothenburg Quartet. Garaguly began his association with the Stockholm Concert Society (today the Royal Stockholm Philharmonic Orchestra) in 1930 as deputy leader, in which post he also performed solos in concert works by Mozart, Wieniawski, Pergament, Berwald, Mendelssohn and Hubay. He continued as deputy leader up until being appointed principal conductor of the orchestra from 1942 until 1953. Having studied conducting with Clemens Krauss he had made his debut as conductor in March 1940, having previously conducted two schools concerts. During his tenure he led nearly 300 concerts, as well 100 school or youth concerts. He conducted two concerts in London in 1952 during the orchestra's visit. Garaguly's appointment was not universally welcomed, with some criticizing the orchestra board for not giving the job to Tor Mann. In addition, Kurt Atterberg attacked Garaguly's nomination because he was not born in Sweden (although he had lived there for half his life and was married to a Swedish woman). His primary repertoire interest was modern music, but he also conducted the major classics. His rehearsal and preparation was much admired and the orchestra became more reliable technically during his tenure. His final appearance conducting the orchestra was on 26 October 1982.

Garaguly was named music director of Harmonien (the Bergen Philharmonic Orchestra) in 1952. He was conductor of the Arnhem Symphony Orchestra (officially called Het Gelders Orkest (HGO) in Dutch) from 1959 to 1972, and the Sønderjyllands Symfoniorkester in Denmark from 1965 to 1979, while also returning to Stockholm to guest conduct.

He gave the premiere of the symphony of Anne-Marie Ørbeck in 1954 in Bergen.

== Discography ==
Berlin Classics have issued recordings of Garaguly conducting the Dresden Philharmonic Orchestra in Sibelius Symphonies 1 and 7, the Háry János Suite by Kodály, pieces by Johann Strauss and a suite from Lady Macbeth of the Mtsensk district, Op. 29 by Shostakovich. In their series of violin concertos with Kai Laursen, Danacord has several where the conductor is Garaguly leading the South Jutland Symphony Orchestra: Concerto for Violin in A major, Op. 6 by Svendsen, Concerto for Violin in G major by Ludvig Holm, Concerto for Violin in D major, Op. 20 by Peder Gram, Concerto for Violin in G major, Op. 11 by Hakon Børresen, Concerto for Violin in D major by Enna, Concerto for Violin in B minor, Op. 27 by Gustav Helsted, Concerto for Violin, Op. 48 by Emborg and the Chamber Concerto no 9 for Violin and Viola, Op. 39 by Holmboe. Carl Nielsen's Symphony No 2 and Suite for String Orchestra were recorded by Garaguly with the Tivoli Orchestra (Vox). Other discs listed by CHARM are Tchaikovsky's Piano Concerto No. 1 with Victor Schiøler, piano (1945, Tono), Beethoven Piano Concerto No. 5 in E-flat major also with Schiøler, (1947 HMV), Brahms Symphony No. 1 by the Rundfunk-Sinfonie-Orchester Berlin (1957 Eterna), Sibelius Tapiola, also in Berlin, Lars-Erik Larsson's Music for orchestra, Op. 40 and Hilding Rosenberg's Concerto for string orchestra. A recording of Garaguly conducting for Jussi Björling on 9 June 1954 in Bergen has been issued on the Bluebell label.

As leader of the Garaguly Quartet, he is heard in recordings of Stenhammar's String Quartet No. 5 in C major, Op. 29, Atterberg's String quartet in B, Op 11/2, Larsson's Intima Miniatyrer Op. 20, and Rosenberg's String Quartet No 4.

On one disk of Caprice CAP 21620 a range of his solo violin recordings have been reissued.

Cultural offices
Preceded by Fritz Busch	Principal Conductors, Royal Stockholm Philharmonic Orchestra; 1942–1953	Succeeded by Hans Schmidt-Isserstedt
Preceded by Olav Kielland	Principal Conductors, Bergen Philharmonic Orchestra; 1952–1958	Succeeded by Arvid Fladmoe
