= Tabita Berglund =

Norwegian conductor and cellist

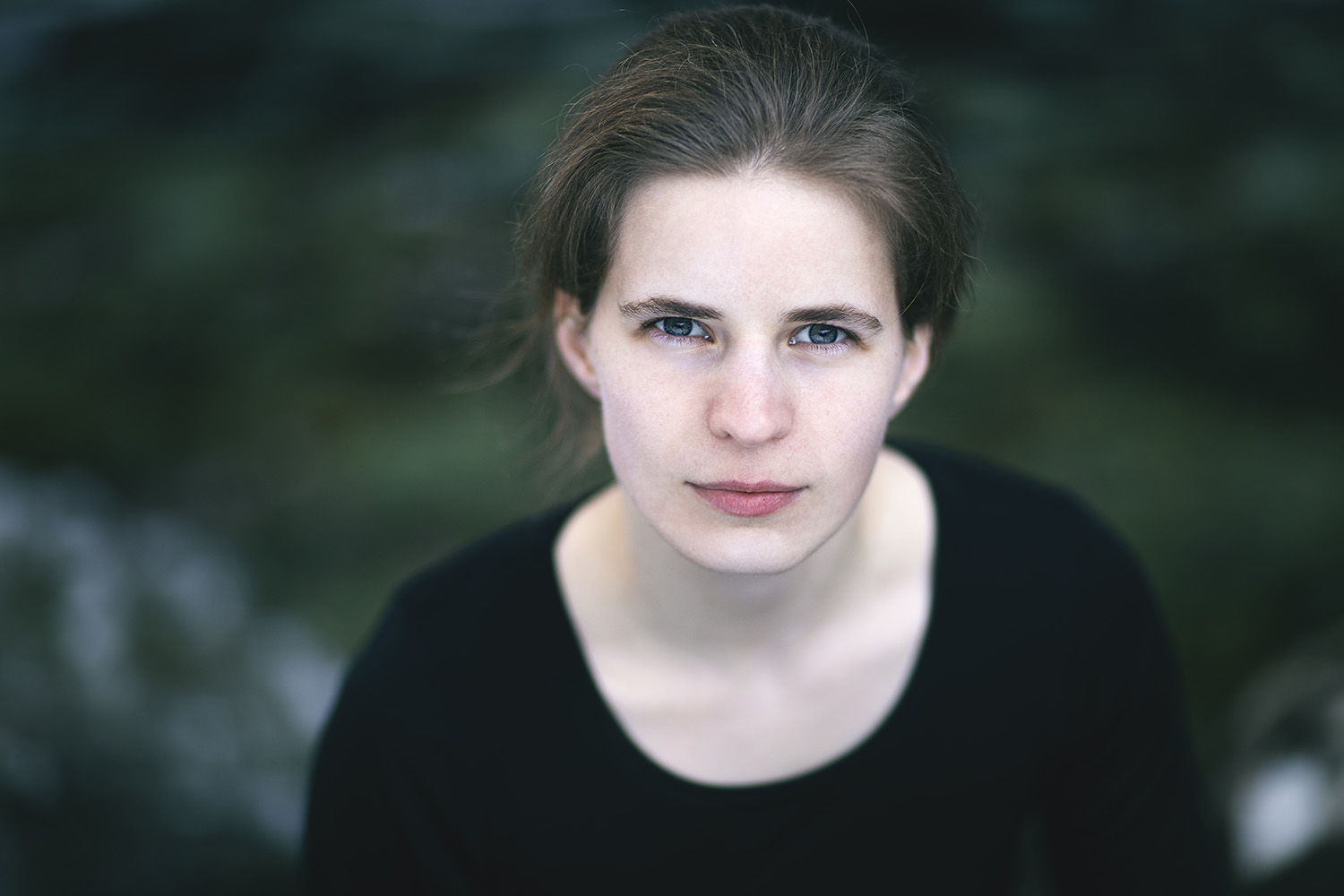
Tabita Berglund in 2019

Ingrid Tabita Borghild Berglund (born 28 March 1989) is a Norwegian conductor and cellist.

== Biography ==
Born in a village in County Trøndelag, Berglund studied cello as a youth, at the Trondheim Kommunale Musikk- og Kulturskole. She continued her music education at the Trondheim Conservatory of Music, where her teachers included Øyvind Gimse. She further studied music at the Norwegian Academy of Music (Norges musikkhøgskole, or NMH), where her primary cello instructor was Truls Mørk. She earned a master's degree from NMH in 2015. From 2008 to 2018, she played cello as a freelancer with such ensembles as the Trondheim Soloists. In 2015, she became a deputy cellist with the Bergen Philharmonic Orchestra.

In 2015, Berglund intended to take a course in ensemble management at NMH, which required an entrance examination in conducting, which she had never previously done. She subsequently contacted Ole Kristian Ruud of the conducting faculty at NMH. Ruud allowed her to sit in on his conducting classes, which initiated her long-term interest in conducting. In 2017, Berglund then began studies on a second master's degree from NMH, with a focus on conducting and with Ruud as her principal mentor. During this period, she participated in conducting master classes with Bernard Haitink, Jorma Panula, and Jaap van Zweden. In 2018, Talent Norges ('Talent Norway') selected Berglund for its Opptakt training programme for young conductors, for the period from 2018 to 2020. She received the Neeme Järvi Prize at the 2018 Gstaad Conducting Academy. Berglund completed her second master's degree from NMH in conducting in 2019.

Berglund's Opptakt period led to guest-conducting engagements with such ensembles as the Gothenburg Symphony Orchestra, the Oslo Philharmonic, and Norwegian National Opera and Ballet. She first guest-conducted the Bergen Philharmonic Orchestra in a quarantined concert in December 2020. In 2021, she became principal guest conductor of the Kristiansand Symphony Orchestra, with a contract of three years.

In the UK, Berglund made her guest-conducting debut with The Hallé in November 2019. In January 2023, Berglund made her USA conducting debut with the Detroit Symphony Orchestra. In February 2024, the Detroit Symphony announced the appointment of Berglund as its next principal guest conductor, the first female conductor ever named to the post, effective with the 2024–2025 season, with an initial contract of four years.

In November 2023, Berglund first guest-conducted the Dresden Philharmonic. In May 2024, on the basis of this appearance, the Dresden Philharmonic announced the appointment of Berglund as its next principal guest conductor, the first female conductor to be named to the post, effective with the 2025–2026 season, for a minimum initial period of two seasons.

In September 2025, Berglund made her first subscription series guest-conducting appearance with the Bergen Philharmonic. In March 2026, the Bergen Philharmonic Orchestra announced the appointment of Berglund as its next chief conductor, effective with the 2027–2028 season, with an initial contract of four seasons. This appointment marks her first orchestra leadership post. Berglund is the first female conductor to be named chief conductor of the Bergen Philharmonic, the second female conductor to be named to an artistic directorship position with a Norwegian orchestra, and the first female conductor to be named chief conductor of a full-scale Norwegian symphony orchestra.

In September 2026, the Sibelius-selskapet i Norge (Sibelius Society of Norway) announced Berglund as the recipient of the 2026 Sibelius Prize. In October 2026, Telenor announced Berglund as the recipient of the Telenor Culture Prize 2026.
