= Edward Gardner (conductor) =

English conductor

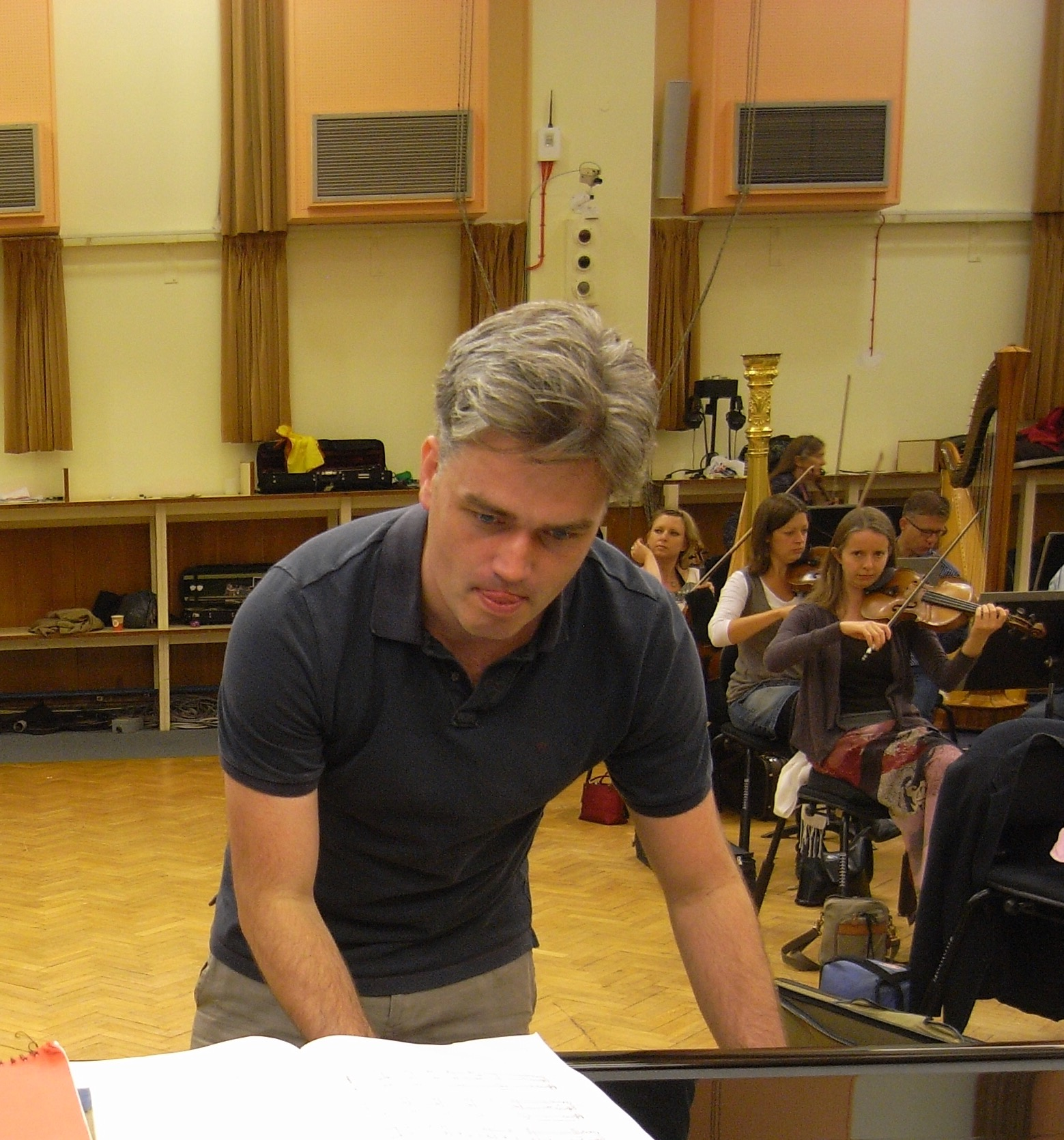
Edward Gardner in September 2011

Edward Gardner OBE (born 22 November 1974) is an English conductor. While still studying at the Royal Academy of Music in the late 1990s, he began his professional career as a choral conductor and repetiteur. Among other early posts, he was music director of Glyndebourne on Tour from 2004 to 2007. Gardner was music director of English National Opera from 2007 to 2015. From 2010 to 2016, he was principal guest conductor of the City of Birmingham Symphony Orchestra, and since 2013, he has been principal guest conductor of the Bergen Philharmonic Orchestra. Since 2021, he has been principal conductor of the London Philharmonic Orchestra. In 2022, he also became artistic advisor of the Norwegian National Opera and Ballet, and, in 2024, he became its music director.

== Biography ==
Gardner was born in Gloucester, and sang as a chorister at Gloucester Cathedral. As a youth, he played piano, clarinet and organ. He attended the King's School, Gloucester and Eton College. At the University of Cambridge, he continued as a music student, and was a choral scholar in King's College Choir. He had begun choral conducting at Eton, and continued conducting at Cambridge. He also studied at the Royal Academy of Music, where his teachers included Colin Metters. He graduated from the RAM in 2000.

From 1997 until 2002, Gardner was Musical Director of Wokingham Choral Society, a post previously held by Graeme Jenkins, Paul Daniel, and Stephen Layton. In 1999, whilst still a student at the Royal Academy of Music, Gardner became a repetiteur at the Salzburg Festival at the invitation of Michael Gielen when another repetiteur became ill. Gardner subsequently served as an assistant conductor to Mark Elder at The Hallé Orchestra for three years. In 2003, Gardner was named music director of Glyndebourne on Tour, and held the post from 2004 to 2007.

In 2005, Gardner won the Young Artist prize of the Royal Philharmonic Society. In March 2006, he was appointed music director of English National Opera. He formally took up the post in May 2007 with an initial contract of 3 years. Although there had not been any press announcements of Gardner extending his ENO contract, in 2011 he said he planned to work with ENO until at least 2015. In January 2014, ENO announced the scheduled conclusion of Gardner's tenure as music director in 2015.

In September 2010, the City of Birmingham Symphony Orchestra announced the appointment of Gardner as its next principal guest conductor, effective September 2011, with an initial contract of 3 years, for 3–4 weeks of concerts per season. He concluded his tenure as CBSO principal guest conductor in July 2016. Outside the UK, in February 2013, Gardner was simultaneously named the next principal guest conductor of the Bergen Philharmonic Orchestra, effective August 2013, and the orchestra's next principal conductor effective with the 2015–2016 season. His initial contract as principal conductor was for 3 years. In January 2017, the orchestra announced the extension of Gardner's contract in Bergen through 2021. In September 2019, the orchestra further extended Gardner's Bergen contract through 2023. In June 2021, the orchestra announced a 1-year extension of Gardner's Bergen Philharmonic contract through July 2024. Gardner concluded his tenure as chief conductor at the close of the 2023–2024 season, at which time the orchestra named him its æresdirigent (honorary conductor).

Gardner made his guest-conducting debut with the London Philharmonic Orchestra (LPO) in 2003. In July 2019, the LPO announced the appointment of Gardner as its next principal conductor, effective with the 2021-2022 season, with an initial contract of 5 years. In September 2024, the LPO announced the extension of Gardner's contract as principal conductor for an additional two years. Gardner is scheduled to conclude his tenure as principal conductor of the LPO at the close of the 2027-2028 season.

In February 2022, the Norwegian National Opera and Ballet announced the appointment of Gardner as its artistic advisor, with immediate effect, and as its next music director, effective 1 August 2024.

Gardner has conducted several recordings for EMI Classics, including collaborations with Alison Balsom and Kate Royal. He has recorded regularly for Chandos Records, which has included recordings of music by Berlioz, Witold Lutosławski and Benjamin Britten.

== Honours ==
In 2008, the Royal Philharmonic Society named Gardner its Conductor of the Year. Gardner was appointed Officer of the Order of the British Empire in the 2012 Birthday Honours for services to music.

== Personal life ==
Gardner has a son, Charlie, from his past relationship with Alison Balsom. As of 2025 he resides in London and Oslo.

Cultural offices
Preceded by Louis Langrée	Music Director, Glyndebourne on Tour; 2004–2007	Succeeded by Robin Ticciati
Preceded by Paul Daniel	Music Director, English National Opera; 2007–2015	Succeeded by Mark Wigglesworth
Preceded by Andrew Litton	Chief Conductor, Bergen Philharmonic Orchestra; 2015–2024	Succeeded by Tabita Berglund (designate, effective autumn 2027)
Preceded by Karl-Heinz Steffens	Music Director, Norwegian National Opera and Ballet; 2024–present	Succeeded by incumbent
