= Issay Dobrowen =

Russian and Norwegian composer (1891–1953)

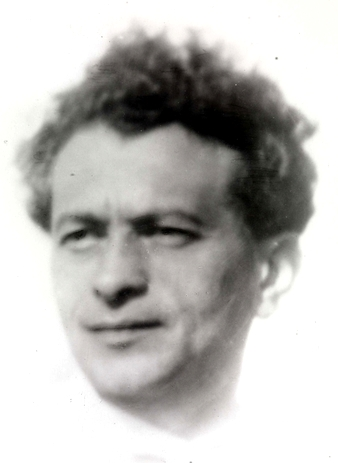
Dobrowen in 1931

Issay Alexandrovich Dobrowen (Russian: Исай Александрович Добровейн; 27 February [O.S. 15 February] 1891 – 9 December 1953), born Itschok Zorachovitch Barabeitchik (Russian: Ицхок Зорахович Барабейчик), was a Russian and Norwegian pianist, composer and conductor. He left Russia in 1922 and became a Norwegian citizen in 1929.

== Biography ==
Itschok Zorachovitch Barabeitchik was born on 27 February 1891 of Jewish parents in Nizhny Novgorod, Russia, and studied at the Moscow Conservatory. His teachers including Konstantin Igumnov and Sergei Taneyev, graduating with a gold medal. He taught from 1917–1921 at the Moscow Philharmonic Conservatory. He once played Beethoven's Sonata Appassionata for Vladimir Lenin, this sonata being the revolutionary's favorite piece of music. Dobrowen directed the first German performance of Mussorgsky's Boris Godunov (Dresden, 1922). Dobrowen went on to conduct the Oslo Philharmonic orchestra (1928–31), at the Sofia Opera (1927–28), and the San Francisco Symphony (1931–34) and the Gothenburg Symphony (1941–53) orchestras.

Dobrowen worked with both Nikolai Medtner and Artur Schnabel, among other well-known musicians. He was also a close friend of the Russian writer Maxim Gorky, and the Norwegian explorer Fridtjof Nansen. He conducted his last concert with the Oslo Philharmonic in December 1952. His last concert was held on 19 January 1953, when he conducted the Stuttgart Orchestra. He died 9 December 1953 in Oslo at the age of 62.

== Compositions ==
He wrote piano music reminiscent of Sergei Rachmaninoff. Interest in Dobrowen as a composer has started to increase, thanks to a small number of new recording projects, involving the editing and collation of orchestral parts for his Piano Concerto in C♯ minor, Op. 20, which he himself played in a number of countries. As well as the concerto, whose style and orchestration recall Medtner, Rachmaninoff and Alexander Scriabin, three of his piano sonatas and a violin sonata have also appeared on disc in recent times.

== Sources ==
- Randel, Don Michael (1996). "Dobrowen, Issay (Alexandrovich)". The Harvard Biographical Dictionary of Music. Harvard University Press. p. 218. ISBN 978-0-674-37299-3.
