= Richard Henneberg =

German composer and conductor

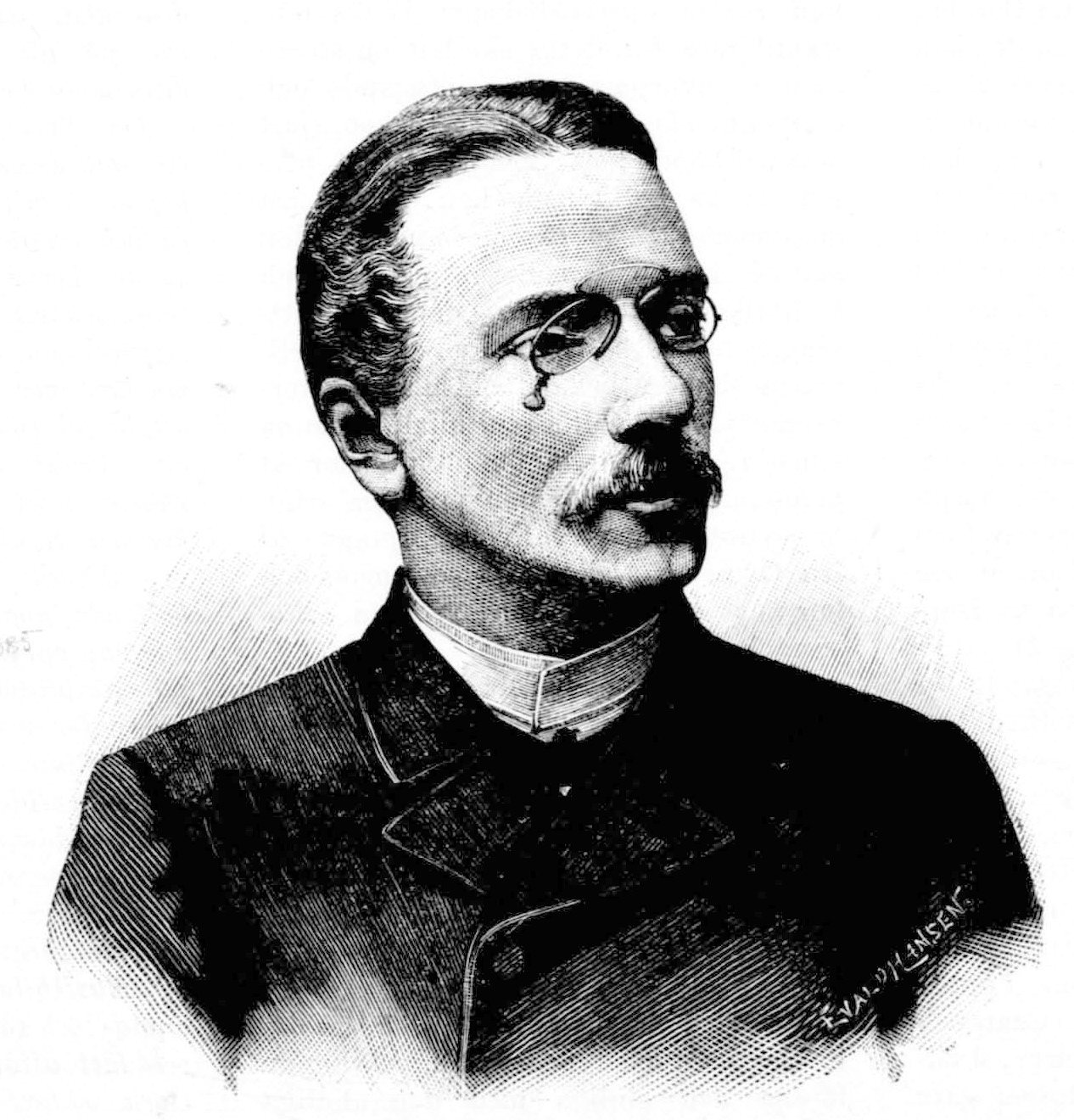
Richard Henneberg. Xylography 1889.

Karl Vilhelm Albert Richard Henneberg (5 August 1853 – 19 October 1925) was a German composer and conductor, who later lived in Sweden.

== Biography ==
His mother was named Augusta Boltman, and his father, Albert Henneberg, was an opera singer. He was born in Berlin, Germany. He was a student of Rust, had a concert tour in Scandinavia in 1872 and the following year at the age of twenty, became conductor of Harmonien (later Bergen Philharmonic Orchestra) in Bergen, Norway. After serving in Bergen, he travelled with a German opera company and settled in Stockholm, Sweden, where he became Kapellmeister of a small theater in 1878, the new theater in 1879, and the opera in 1885.

His compositions include the opera Drottningens vallfart, the ballet Undina and music to the plays Brand, Lyco-Pers resa and Diamantbröllopet. He also composed diverse chamber music, piano pieces, choral works and solo songs. He was married in 1879 to Fanny Louise Behrens and in 1900 to Thyra Maria Gyllenskepp. He died in Malmö, Sweden in 1925.
