= Dmitri Kitayenko =

Russian conductor (born 1940)

- Дмитрий Китаенко
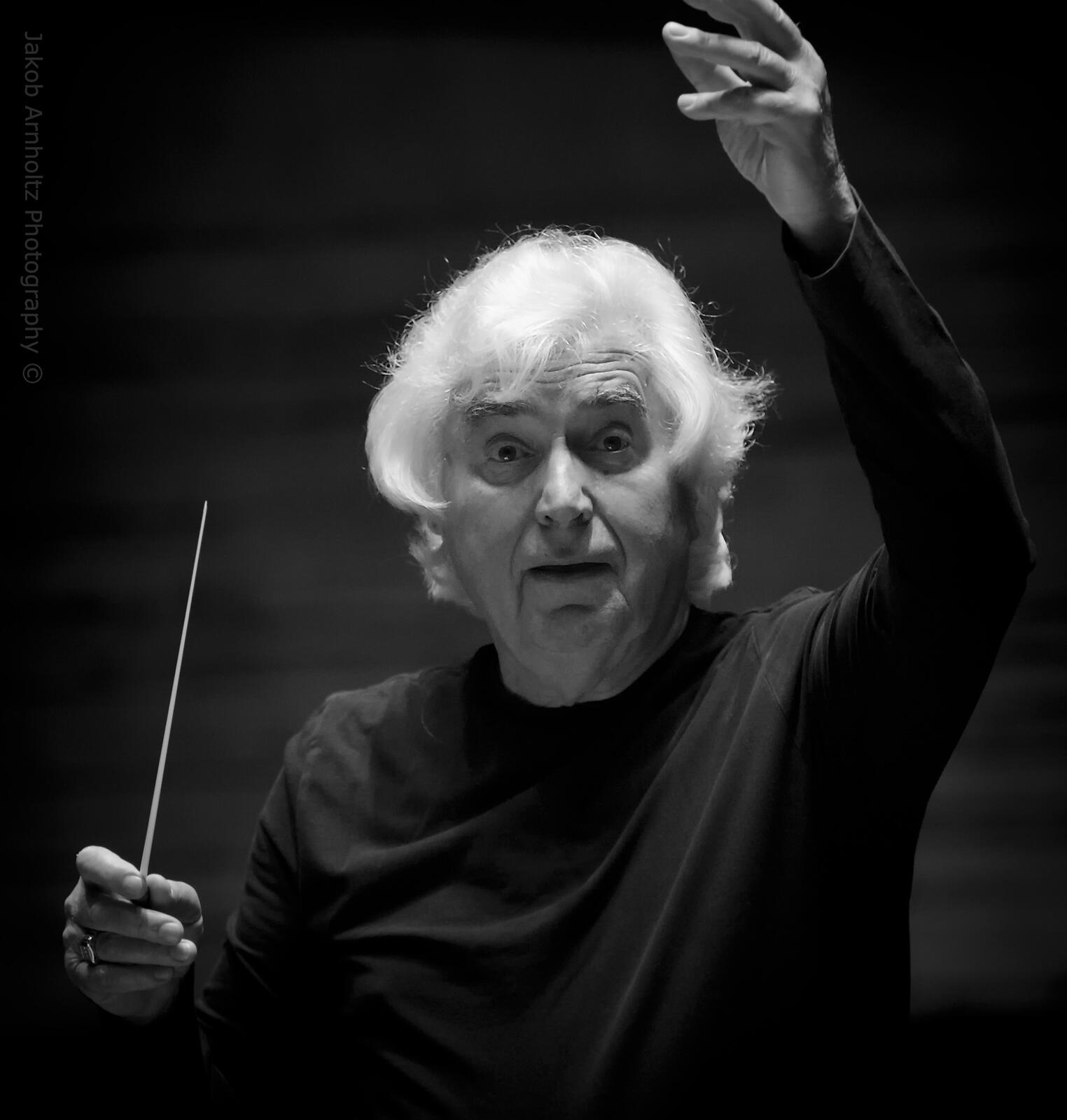
- Kitayenko in 2018
- Born: 18 August 1940 (age 85); Leningrad
- Education: Glinka Conservatory, Leningrad Conservatory, Moscow Conservatory, Music Academy of Vienna
- Occupation: Conductor

Dmitri Georgievich Kitayenko (also spelled Dmitrij Kitajenko; Russian: Дми́трий Гео́ргиевич Китае́нко; born 18 August 1940) is a Soviet and Russian conductor. He was bestowed the title People's Artist of the USSR (1984).

He was born in Leningrad, Soviet Union. He studied at Glinka Conservatory, at Leningrad Conservatory and then at Moscow Conservatory with Leo Ginzburg and at Music Academy of Vienna with Hans Swarowsky. He was a prizewinner in the first Herbert von Karajan competition in 1969.

Richard Strauss: Don Juan, excerpt from a 1992 recording with the Frankfurt Radio Symphony

Kitayenko served as principal conductor of the Stanislavski and Nemirovich-Danchenko Moscow Academic Music Theatre (1970–1976). Then he was music director of the Moscow Philharmonic Orchestra for 14 years. He has also held principal conductorships with the Bergen Philharmonic Orchestra (1990–1998), the Frankfurt Radio Symphony (1990–1996), the American Russian Young Artists Orchestra, the KBS Symphony Orchestra (1999–2004), and the Bern Symphony Orchestra (1990–2004).

Cultural offices
Preceded by Kirill Kondrashin	Music Director, Moscow Philharmonic Orchestra; 1976–1990	Succeeded by Vassily Sinaisky
Preceded by Aldo Ceccato	Principal Conductor, Bergen Philharmonic Orchestra; 1990–1998	Succeeded by Simone Young
Preceded by Myung-whun Chung	Principal Conductor, KBS Symphony Orchestra; 1999–2004	Succeeded by Shin-ik Hahm
