= Olavshallen Concert Hall =

Building in Trondheim, Norway

Coordinates: 63°25′59.732″N 10°24′13.662″E

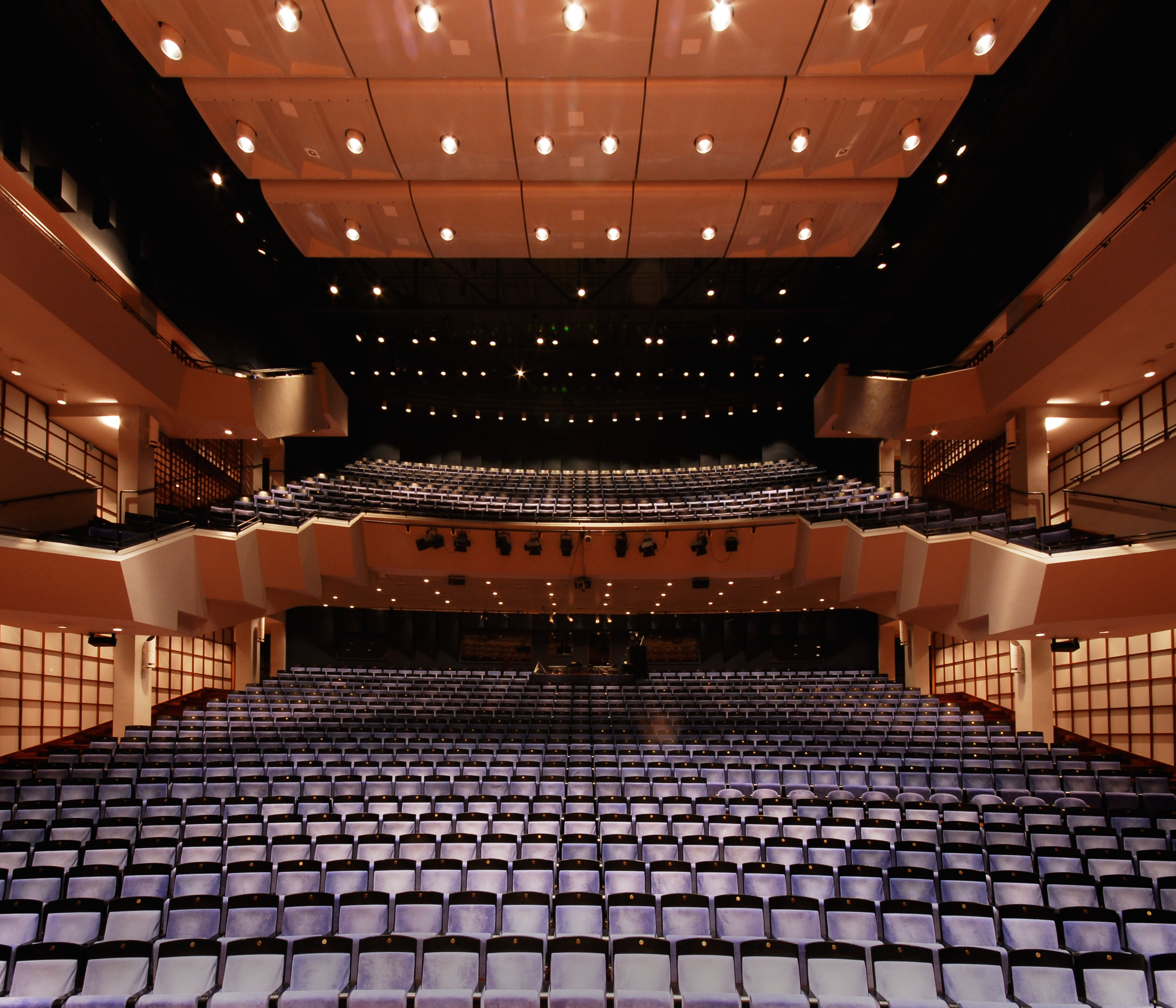
The Large Hall, Olavshallen

Olavshallen (English: Olav Hall or Olav Concert Hall) was built in 1989 as a concert hall and is named after a historical tradition in Trondheim, Norway, the St. Olav tradition. The foundation stone was laid by HM King Olav V 22 July 1988. Olavshallen opened for its first concert 17 September 1989 with jazz pianist Oscar Peterson and the official opening was held on 21 September.

Olavshallen consists of two concert rooms - a main auditorium, the Large Hall has a seating capacity of 1240 and Little Hall with a capacity of 350 spectators. Olavshallen each year welcomes artists from various genres such as classical music, opera, dance, ballet, pop, rock, country, jazz, world music and children's and family events, shows, theater, cabaret and stand-up comedy shows. Trondheim Symphony Orchestra has its permanent abode in Olavshallen.

Olavshallen has 260-300 concerts a year and an annual attendance of approximately 150,000.

The managing company Olavshallen AS, owned by the municipality receives no public funding for the operation of the culture.
