= Ole Rødder =

Ole Rødder (1743–1806) was a Norwegian violinist. He became the first paid musician of Bergen's Musikselskabet Harmonien in 1783, serving as concertmaster of the orchestra, which later became the Bergen Philharmonic Orchestra. Rødder was a stadsmusikant (town musician) in Bergen from 1789. He was a regular visitor to the Altona tavern, where the orchestra rehearsed in its early days.
