= Johan Henrich Poulson =

Danish violinist

Johan Henrich Poulson was a Danish violinist. He was a student of Giovanni Battista Viotti. He relocated to Bergen, Norway in 1799, and stayed there until 1826. While in Bergen, he became Ole Bull's first teacher, was active as a recitalist, and also served as concertmaster for Musikselskabet Harmonien (which later became the Bergen Philharmonic Orchestra).
