= Karsten Andersen =

Norwegian conductor

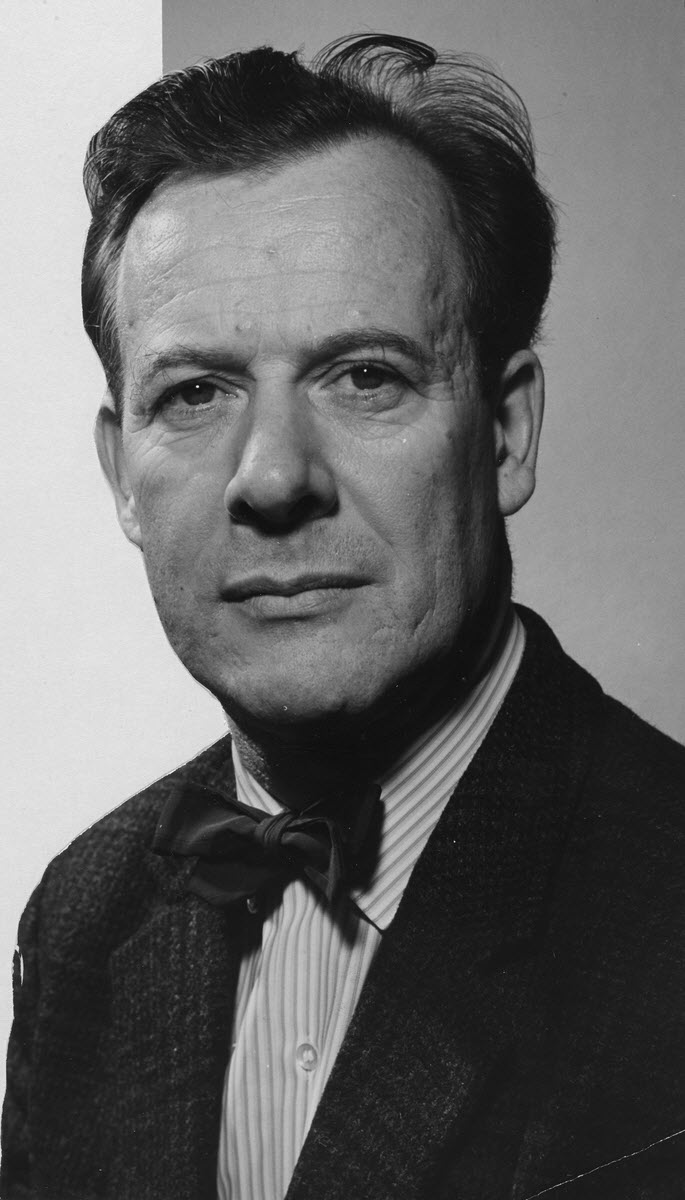
Karsten Andersen in 1964

Karsten Anker Andersen (16 February 1920 – 15 December 1997) was a Norwegian conductor.

== Life ==
Karsten Andersen was born in Fredrikstad. He graduated from the Oslo Music Conservatory (1938–39) and Accademia Musicale Chigiana (1947). He made his debut as a violinist in 1939. He was employed by the Oslo Philharmonic in Oslo from 1940 to 1945.

He was Principal Conductor of the Bergen Philharmonic Orchestra from 1964 to 1985, becoming Artistic Director in 1966. His repertoire includes much contemporary Norwegian music. He was also Principal Conductor of the Iceland Symphony Orchestra from 1973 to 1978.

From 1985 to 1988, Andersen was professor of conducting at the Norwegian Academy of Music. He was one of the three founders of the Youth Orchestra, which he initiated, together with violinist Leif Jørgensen and trumpeter Harry Kvebæk. His interment was at Oslo Western Civil Cemetery.

== Awards ==
- 1974 Norwegian Arts Council Music Prize
- 1975 Norwegian state artist award
