= Ferdinand Giovanni Schediwy =

Norwegian musician

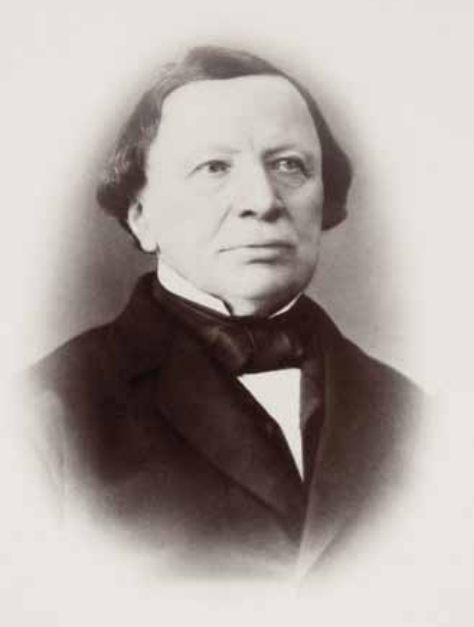
Ferdinand Giovanni Schediwy, c. 1852

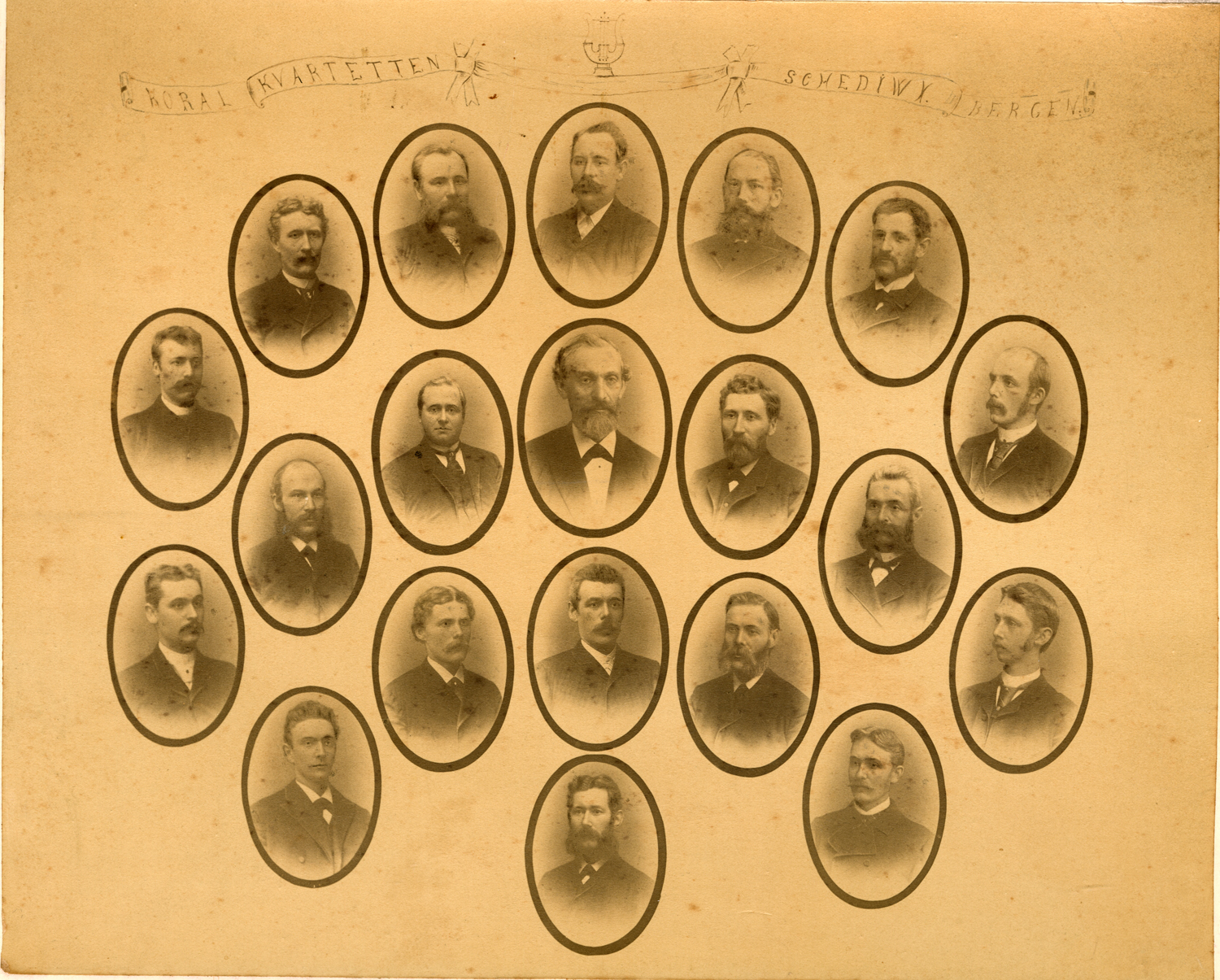
The Coral Quartet, Schediwy

Ferdinand Giovanni Schediwy (2 June 1801 – 12 October 1877) was a Norwegian conductor, composer, organist and teacher. He immigrated from Prague to Bergen, Norway, where he became very active in the musical environment. He was Edvard Grieg's first music teacher and became leader of the Bergen Philharmonic Orchestra (then called Harmonien) in 1827.

Ferdinand Giovanni Schediwy is not related to Franz Schediwy, founder and owner of a company under the same name in Ludwigsburg, Germany, which manufactured and sold brass instruments for orchestral use.
