= Eivind Aadland =

Norwegian conductor and violinist

- Born: Eivind Aadland; 19 September 1956 (age 69); Bergen
- Occupation: Conductor

Eivind Aadland (born 19 September 1956) is a Norwegian conductor and violinist. He has been concert master of the Bergen Philharmonic Orchestra. Since 2020 he has been Chief Conductor and Artistic Director of the Tasmanian Symphony Orchestra

Aadland was Chief Conductor and Artistic Leader of the Trondheim Symphony Orchestra between 2004–2010 and maintains a regular relationship with many Scandinavian orchestras, including the Oslo and Bergen Philharmonics, Stavanger Symphony and Swedish Chamber Orchestra. At Den Norske Opera in Oslo he has conducted productions of Don Giovanni, Le nozze di Figaro, Die Zauberflöte and Die Fledermaus.

Recent seasons have included performances with the Orchestre du Capitole de Toulouse, the Swedish Radio and Melbourne Symphony Orchestras, the Lausanne and Scottish Chamber Orchestras and the Symphony Orchestras of Gothenburg, the Finnish Radio, SWR Stuttgart and WDR Cologne. Engagements during the 08/09 season included concerts with the Iceland Symphony Orchestra, Tasmanian Symphony Orchestra and the Queensland Orchestra, Royal Flemish Philharmonic and the Orchestre National de Belgique.

Mr. Aadland's recording output encompasses a diverse range of repertoire and he is a champion of Norwegian and Swedish composers. These include the symphonic works of Eivind Groven, a disc of Norwegian orchestral favourites and the complete music for violin and orchestra of Arne Nordheim with the Stavanger Symphony – all for BIS records. On the Simax label Aadland he has made discs of Irgens Jensen's works with the Bergen Philharmonic, music of Ole Bull with the Trondheim Symphony and music of Gustav Holst, Percy Grainger and Florent Schmitt with The staff band of the Norwegian Armed Forces. Also with the Trondheim Symphony, he has recorded two discs devoted to the orchestral music of Ludwig Irgens-Jensen and Gerhard Schjeldrup for CPO Records. He has also recorded for Hyperion, ASV, IMP Classics, and Koch.

A student of Jorma Panula, Eivind Aadland was encouraged by Mariss Jansons to pursue his conducting career. Previously as a violinist, Eivind Aadland was concertmaster of the Bergen Philharmonic (1981–1989) and music director of the European Union Chamber Orchestra during 1987–1997, with whom he directed concerts at concert halls and festivals throughout Europe, and made a number of recordings. Mr. Aadland studied with Yehudi Menuhin and together they performed chamber concerts in Paris and London as well as in Switzerland.
