= Ole Kristian Ruud =

Norwegian conductor (born 1958)

Ole Kristian Ruud (born 2 October 1958) is a Norwegian conductor.

Ruud was born in Lillestrøm. He studied clarinet with Richard Kjelstrup at the Norwegian Academy of Music. He studied conducting at the Sibelius Academy and made his debut in Oslo with the National theater. Ruud was principal conductor of the Trondheim Symphony Orchestra from 1987-1995 and of the Norrköping Symphony Orchestra from 1996-1999. In 1999, he became one of the Stavanger Symphony Orchestra's artistic directors, specializing in Norwegian repertoire. He has been professor of conducting at the Norwegian Academy of Music since 1999.

In 1992, he was awarded the Grieg Prize, and in 1993 conducted Edvard Grieg's complete incidental music to Peer Gynt with the Philharmonia Orchestra in London's Royal Festival Hall. In 2005, he completed recording the complete orchestral works of Grieg with the Bergen Philharmonic Orchestra, for BIS records.

== Selected recordings ==
- Hector Berlioz, Grande symphonie funèbre et triomphale, op.15 H 80B, "La Voie Triomphale": Staff Band of the Norwegian Armed Forces, conducted by Ole Kristian Ruud 2012

Cultural offices
Preceded by Junichi Hirokami	Principal Conductor, Norrköping Symphony Orchestra; 1996-1999	Succeeded by Lü Jia
