= Olav Kielland =

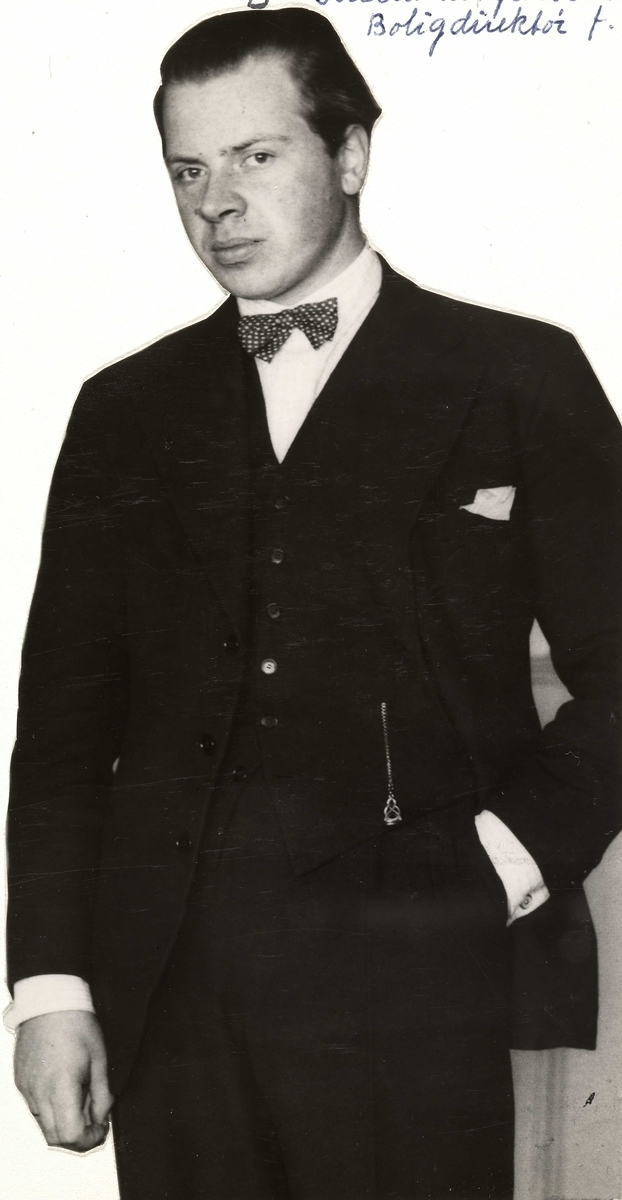
- Olav Kielland ca. 1930-1935

Background information
- Born: Olav Løchen Kielland; 16 August 1901; Norway
- Died: 5 August 1985 (aged 83) Bø i Telemark
- Occupations: Conductor, composer
- Formerly of: Trondheim Symphony Orchestra

Olav Løchen Kielland (16 August 1901 – 5 August 1985) was a Norwegian composer and conductor.

== Early life and education ==
Olav Løchen Kielland was born in Trondheim, the son of Gabriel Kielland (1871–1960) and Margit Løchen (1875–1951). He took his final exams at the Trondheim Cathedral School in 1919. He studied to become an architect like his father at the Norwegian Institute of Technology from 1919 until 1921. He then moved to Leipzig where he studied conducting, composition, piano and bassoon at the Music Conservatory. In 1929 he attended Felix Weingartner's masterclass for conductors in Basel, Switzerland.

== Career ==
Kielland had his debut as a conductor and pianist in Trondheim in 1923. He was repetiteur with the Casino Theatre in Oslo, and conductor with the Stora Teatern in Gothenburg. In 1931, he became the conductor for the Filharmonisk Selskap, now the Oslo Philharmonic), and served as artistic director from 1933 until 1945. In 1939, Kielland was offered the position as chief conductor by the New York Philharmonic Orchestra, but was hindered by the outbreak of World War II and could not travel and accept the position.

During the war, Kielland was for a short period a member of the Cultural Department's temporary consultative council (Departementets midlertidige konsultative råd i kunstneriske spørsmål), which led to accusations of cooperation with the occupying force. Kielland was suspended from several organisations, such as the Norwegian Composer's Union (Komponistforeningen). Even if he already in 1945 was acquitted of the charges, by a committee appointed by the government, Kiellands career was badly damaged, and as late as in 1962, Kielland still had to defend himself against Nazi accusations.

Gradually, Kielland started focusing more and more on the composing, and less on the conducting. He preferred being a guest conductor and only take on shorter engagements. He therefore rejected the offer to return to Filharmonisk Selskap in 1946, but the position was held open until 1949, in case he would reconsider.

Kielland was elected to reorganise the Trondheim Symphony Orchestra in 1946 and was music director of the Bergen Philharmonic Orchestra 1948-52 and artistic director of the Iceland Symphony Orchestra 1952–55. He was guest conductor for a number of other orchestras, such as the Berlin Philharmonic, the London Symphony Orchestra, and the New York Philharmonic.

Kielland's music is strongly influenced by Norwegian folk music and perhaps particularly by the Hardanger fiddle. In 1955, he took up residence in Bø Municipality, where he began to study the Hardanger fiddle dances, in particular the polyphonic elements. The melody, rhythm and timbre of this instrument have given expression to many of his compositions. Kielland's music has a prominent polyphonic tendency, with penetrating dissonant lines. Music which, at its best, performs a synthesis of the folk music's national accent and a contemporary musical idiom.

Kielland composed eight larger symphonic works, amongst those the Violin concerto (1942), the music to the play "Brand" of Ibsen, the Concerto Grosso Norvegese (1952) and the Piano Concerto (1978). He also composed several songs with orchestra, choir songs, psalms, chamber music, and piano works. He died in Bø i Telemark.

== Awards and honors ==
At his death, he was awarded The King's Medal of Merit in gold (Kongens fortjenstmedalje i gull) and was a Knight of the Order of St. Olav and a Commander (Grand Knight) of the Icelandic Order of the Falcon (Hin íslenska fálkaorða).
