= Otto Winter-Hjelm =

Norwegian musician, conductor, writer, composer and music critic

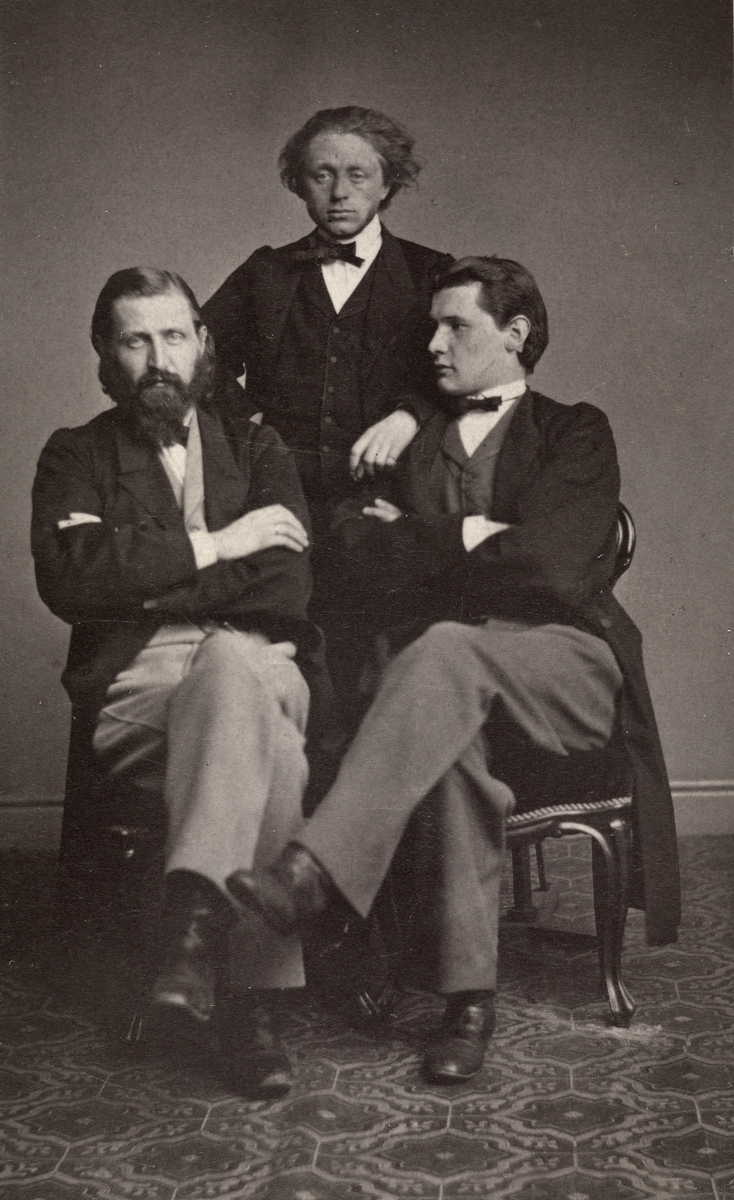
Otto Winther-Hjelm to the left. His brother, Kristin, on the right, unknown person in the middle. Photo C.P. Knudsen, around 1860–1870. (Oslo Museum, Byhistorisk samling)

Otto Winter-Hjelm (8 October 1837 – 3 May 1931) was a Norwegian musician, conductor, writer, composer and music critic.

== Life and career ==
Otto Winther-Hjelm was born in Christiana (Oslo), and studied in Leipzig and Berlin. During his career, he became a leading force in Norwegian music, establishing a music school in 1864 and founding the music Conservatory in Christiana (different from today's Oslo Conservatory of Music and Norwegian Academy of Music) with Edvard Grieg in 1866. He also served as organist for the Trinity Church in Oslo from 1874 to 1921 and music critic for Aftenposten from 1887 to 1913. Winter-Hjelm composed two symphonies and a number of cantata and songs for male chorus.

== Works (selection) ==
- Waltz (1856)
- Piano Trio (whilst studying with Arnold; 1860)
- Overture voor orchestra (1861)
- Symphony No. 1 in B flat major (1862)
- Symphony No. 2 in B minor (1863)
- Ho Åstrid, song on a text of Kristofer Janson (1870)
- Til Halfdan Kjerulfs Minne (1870)
- Fjukande skyer, song (1870)
- 12 Sangstudier (1871)
- Fifty Psalms for piano or harmonium (1872)
- Til Hans Gude for piano (1872)
- Luther Cantata for choir and orchestra (1883)
- Lyset, University cantata on a text of Bjørnstjerne Bjørnson (1897)
