= Piano Sonata No. 23 (Beethoven) =

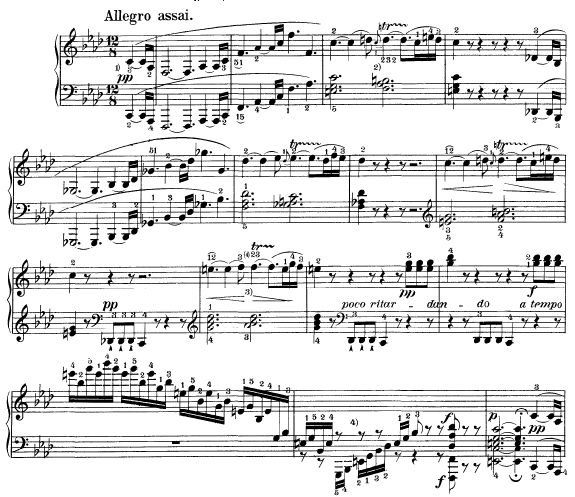
The beginning of the first movement

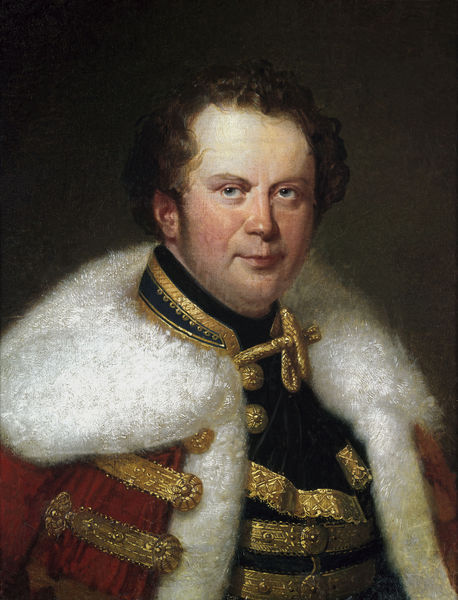
Count Franz von Brunsvik

Ludwig van Beethoven's Piano Sonata No. 23 in F minor, Op. 57 (colloquially known as the Appassionata, meaning "passionate" in Italian) is among the three famous piano sonatas of his middle period (the others being the Waldstein, Op. 53 and Les Adieux, Op. 81a); it was composed during 1804 and 1805, and perhaps 1806, and Beethoven dedicated it to cellist and his friend, Count Franz von Brunsvik. The first edition was published in February 1807 in Vienna.

Unlike the early Sonata No. 8, Pathétique, the Appassionata was not named during the composer's lifetime, but was so labelled in 1838 by the publisher of a four-hand arrangement of the work. Instead, Beethoven's autograph manuscript of the sonata has "La Pasionata" written on the cover, in Beethoven's hand.

One of his greatest and most technically challenging piano sonatas, the Appassionata was considered by Beethoven to be his most tempestuous piano sonata until the twenty-ninth piano sonata (known as the Hammerklavier). 1803 was the year Beethoven came to grips with the irreversibility of his progressive hearing loss.

An average performance of the entire Appassionata sonata lasts about twenty-five to twenty-seven minutes.

== Form ==
The sonata consists of three movements:

1. Allegro assai
2. Andante con moto
3. Allegro ma non troppo – Presto

=== I. Allegro assai ===

A sonata-allegro form in 12/8 time, the first movement progresses quickly through startling changes in tone and dynamics, and is characterised by an economic use of themes.

The main theme, in octaves, is quiet and ominous. It consists of a down-and-up arpeggio in dotted rhythm that cadences on the tonicized dominant, immediately repeated a semitone higher (in G♭). This use of the Neapolitan chord (i.e. the flattened supertonic) is an important structural element in the work, also being the basis of the main theme of the finale.

As in Beethoven's Waldstein sonata, the coda is unusually long, containing quasi-improvisational arpeggios which span most of the early 19th-century piano's range. The choice of F minor becomes very clear when one realises that this movement makes frequent use of the deep, dark tone of the lowest F_{1} on the piano, which was the lowest note available to Beethoven at the time.

The total performance time of this movement is usually between 8 1/2 and 11 minutes.

=== II. Andante con moto ===
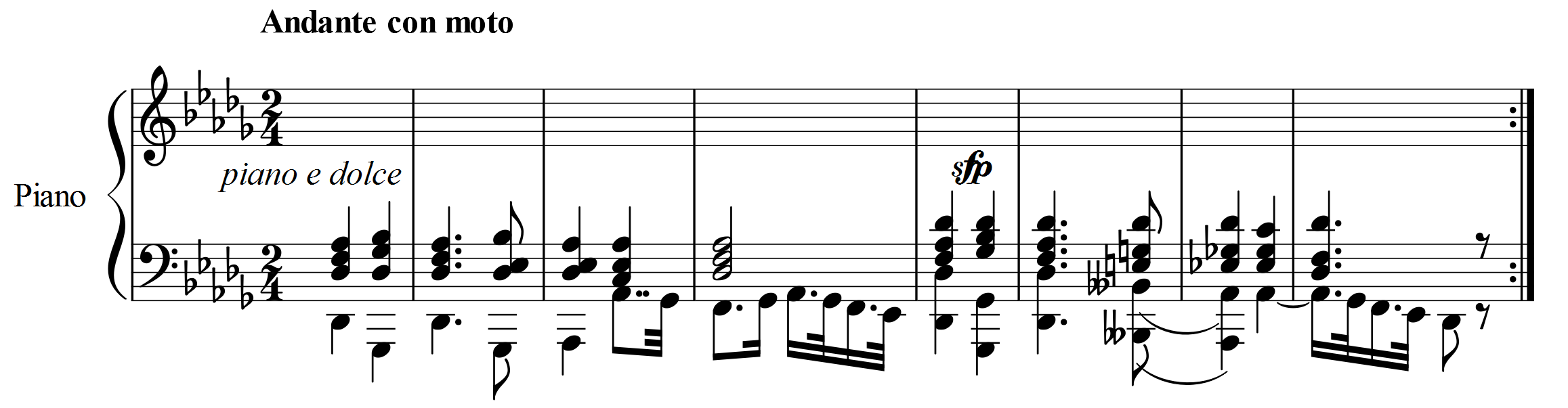

A set of variations in D♭ major, on a theme remarkable for its melodic simplicity combined with the use of unusually thick voicing and a peculiar counter-melody in the bass. Its sixteen bars (repeated) consist of nothing but common chords, set in a series of four- and two-bar phrases that all end on the tonic. (see image) The four variations follow:

1. Similar to the original theme, with the left hand playing on the off-beats.
2. An embellishment of the theme in sixteenth notes.
3. A rapid embellishment in thirty-second notes. The hands switch parts in that variation..
4. A reprise of the original theme without repeats and with the phrases displaced in register.

The fourth variation ends with a deceptive cadence containing the dominant 7th chord instead of the tonic that resolves to a soft diminished seventh on B♭ marked pp (pianissimo), followed by a much louder diminished seventh, marked ff (fortissimo), at an octave higher that serves as a transition (without pause) to the finale.

The total performance time of this movement is about 6 to 8 minutes.

=== III. Allegro ma non troppo – Presto ===
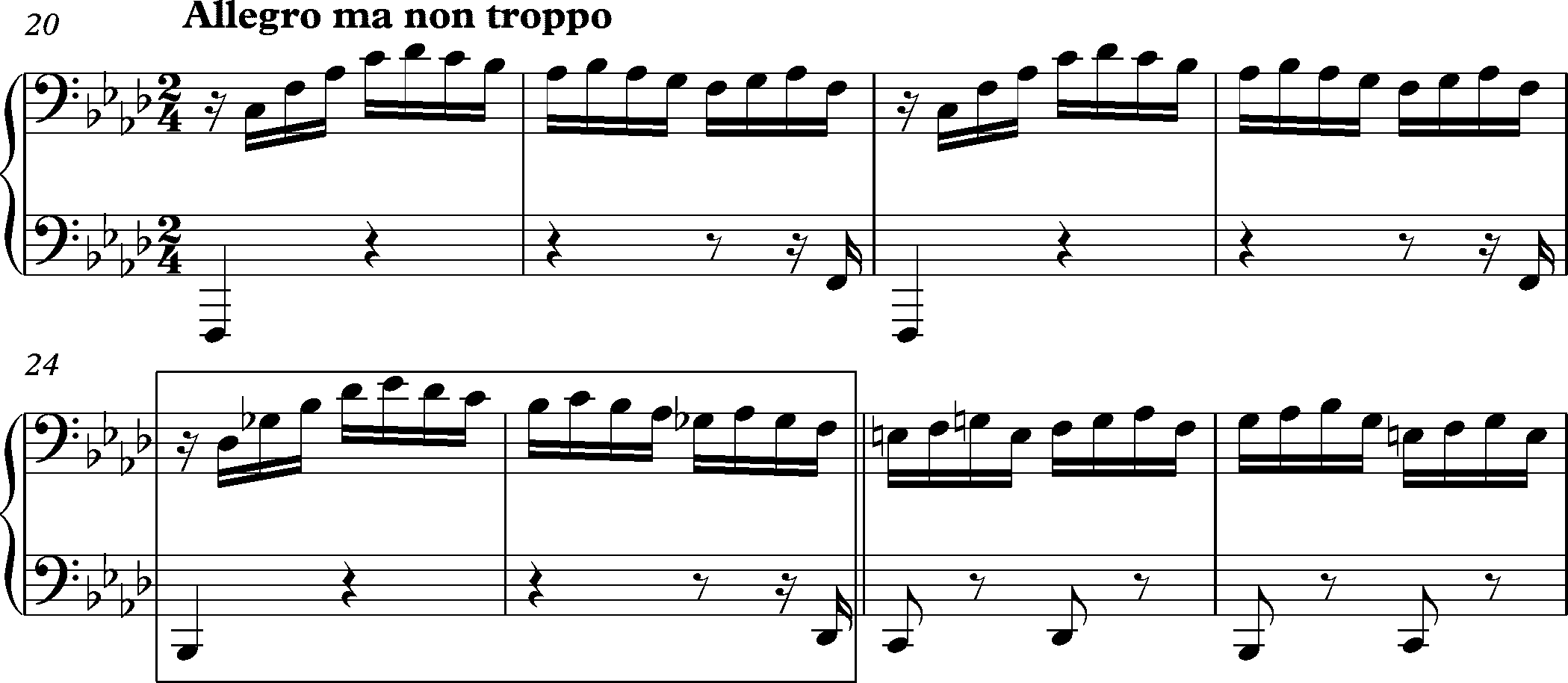

The third movement is a sonata-allegro in near-perpetual motion. It opens with a diminished 7th chord in B♭ that is repeated 13 times. In this movement, the combined development and recapitulation sections are directed to be repeated instead of the exposition, giving it a rondo character. It has much in common with the first movement, including extensive use of the Neapolitan sixth chord and several written-out cadenzas. The movement climaxes with a coda, marked Presto and in a "two-phase binary form". A new theme is introduced, followed by the reinstatement of the main theme at a faster tempo, before ending with a series of descending arpeggios in F minor. According to Donald Tovey this is one of only a handful of Beethoven's works in sonata form that ends in tragedy (the others being the C minor Piano Trio, Piano Sonata Op. 27, No. 2 ("Moonlight"), and the Violin Sonata Op. 30, No. 2.).

The total performance time of this movement is about 7 to 8 minutes with the repeats and about 5 1/2 to 6 minutes without them.
