= Trondheim Symphony Orchestra =

Norwegian orchestra

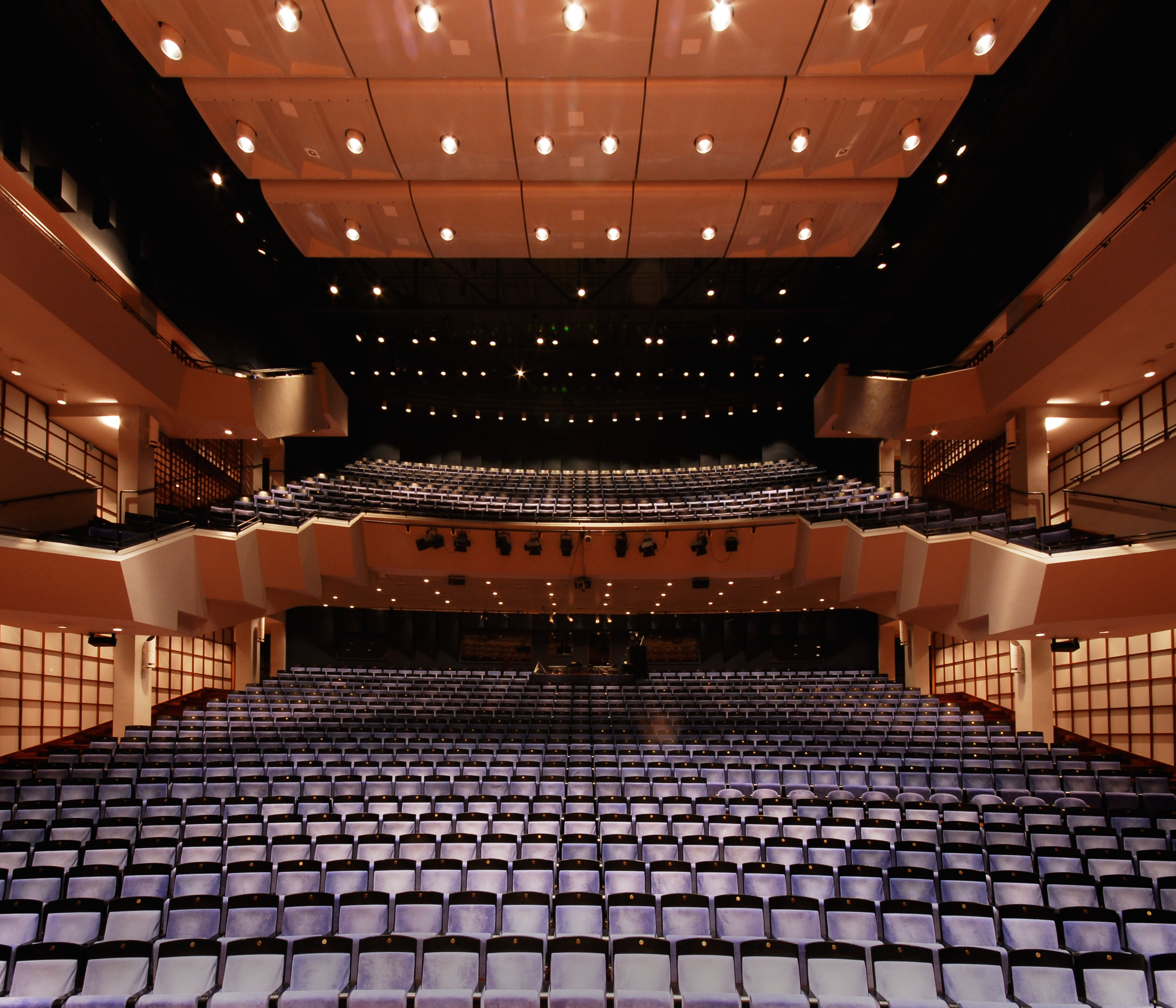
Olavshallen, current home of the Trondheim Symphony Orchestra

The Trondheim Symphony Orchestra & Opera (Norwegian: Trondheim Symfoniorkester & Opera) is a Norwegian orchestra based in Trondheim, Norway. Its principal concert venue is the Olavshallen. The orchestra is organised as a trust and receives public assistance from the Norwegian government, Trøndelag county and the municipality of Trondheim.

== History ==
The precursor ensemble of the Trondheim Symphony Orchestra & Opera held its first concert 10 December 1909, at the Frimurerlogen ('Masonic Lodge') in Trondheim, with an ensemble of 29 players. Through the 1920s, the orchestra's musical activities were modest, but this changed in the 1930s, with an increase in the availability of better-trained musicians and increased financial subsidies, to allow for increased (though not abundant) pay to the orchestra musicians. During World War II, the Frimurerlogen was renamed the Deutsches Haus, while the country was under German occupation, and the orchestra gave concerts in various Trondheim churches. Following World War II, the orchestra returned to the Frimurerlogen as its resident venue and remained there until 1989.

In 1947, the orchestra created its first full-time posts for the musicians, which led to the establishment of the Trondheim Chamber Orchestra. In 1952, the orchestra established the Princess Astrid Music Award to recognize talented young Norwegian musicians, with pianist Kjell Bækkelund as the first winner. This competition continues to this day, held every two years. In 1962, Norwegian Radio (NRK) and the state of Norway formally took over control of the orchestra.

In 1989, the Olavshallen was completed, and the orchestra relocated from Frimurerlogen to the new concert hall that year. The orchestra currently consists of about 85 musicians, and gives around 100 concerts annually. In 2009, the orchestra started to develop a professional opera and musical theatre department.

The orchestra's former chief conductor and artistic leader was Han-na Chang, since the 2017–2018 season. She had previously served as principal guest conductor of the orchestra, beginning with the 2013–2014 season. Her appointment as chief conductor occurred in March 2016. She is the first female conductor to be named chief conductor of the orchestra. In November 2018, the orchestra announced the extension of Chang's contract as chief conductor through the 2022–2023 season. Chang is scheduled to conclude her tenure as chief conductor of the Trondheim Symphony Orchestra at the close of the 2024–2025 season.

In September 2020, James Gaffigan first guest-conducted the orchestra. In February 2021, the orchestra named Gaffigan its new principal guest conductor, with immediate effect, with an initial contract of two seasons.

In August 2024, Adam Hickox first guest-conducted the orchestra. In November 2024, the orchestra announced the appointment of Hickox as its next chief conductor, effective with the 2025–2026 season.

== Chief conductors and artistic leaders ==
- Morten Svendsen (1909–1922)
- S.A. Withammer (1922–1930)
- Håkon Hoem (1930–1946)
- Olav Kielland (1946–1947)
- Arvid Fladmoe (1947–1950)
- Finn Audun Oftedal (1950–1981)
- Jiri Starek (1981–1984)
- Leonid Grin (1985)
- Ole Kristian Ruud (1987–1995)
- Daniel Harding (1997–2000)
- Eivind Aadland (2003–2010)
- Krzysztof Urbanski (2010–2017)
- Han-na Chang (2017–2025)
- Adam Hickox (2025-present)
