= Due (surname) =

Due is a surname. Notable people with the name include:

- Alessandro Duè (1913–?), Italian footballer
- Alette Due (1812–1887), Norwegian singer and composer
- Anders Due (born 1982), Danish footballer
- Christian Due-Boje (born 1966), Swedish ice-hockey player
- Frederik Due (1796–1873), Norwegian military officer and statesman
- Frederik Due (footballer) (born 1992), Danish footballer
- Henrik Adam Due (1891–1966), Norwegian violinist
- Louise Bager Due (born 1982), Danish handball player
- Mary Barratt Due (1888–1969), Norwegian pianist
- Ole Due (1931–2005), Danish judge
- Patricia Stephens Due (1939–2012), African-American civil rights activist
- Paul Due (1835–1919), Norwegian architect
- Paul Armin Due (1870–1926), Norwegian architect
- Peter Due (born 1947), Danish Olympic sailor
- Reidar Due (1922–2021), Norwegian politician
- Steen Due (1898–1974), Danish field-hockey player
- Stephan Barratt-Due (born 1956), Norwegian violinist
- Stephan Henrik Barratt-Due (1919–1985), Norwegian violinist
- Tananarive Due (born 1966), American writer
- Thomas Due (born 1971), Norwegian curler

== See also ==
- Stefan Due Schmidt (born 1994), Danish speed skater
- Due (disambiguation)
- Duer, a surname
