= 2011 Echo Klassik Awards =

Edition of German classical music award

- Date: 2 October 2011
- Venue: Konzerthaus Berlin
- Hosted by: Thomas Gottschalk

Television/radio coverage
- Network: ZDF

The 2011 Echo Klassik Awards were held on 2 October 2011. It is the 19th edition of the annual Echo Klassik awards for classical music. The ceremony took place in the Konzerthaus Berlin and was broadcast on ZDF. It was hosted by Thomas Gottschalk.

== Winners ==
The winners of the 2011 Echo Klassik awards were:

- Female Singer of the Year – Simone Kermes – Colori d'Amore
- Male Singer of the Year – Thomas Hampson – Des Knaben Wunderhorn
- Conductor of the Year – Andris Nelsons for Stravinsky
- Instrumentalists of the Year
  - Accordion – Teodoro Anzellotti
  - Violin – Lisa Batiashvili
  - Guitar – Frank Bungarten
  - Cello – Truls Mørk
  - Piano – Murray Perahia
- Ensemble of the Year
  - Modern Instruments – Hagen Quartet
  - Historical Instruments – Hespèrion XXI
  - Vocal Music – Huelgas Ensemble
- Lifetime Achievement Award – Zubin Mehta
- Newcomer awards
  - Vocals Vittorio Grigolo
  - Violin Ray Chen; Vilde Frang
  - Cello Maximilian Hornung
  - Clarinet Sebastian Manz
  - Oboe Ramón Ortega Quero
  - Piano Anna Vinnitskaya; Yuja Wang
  - Conductor Robin Ticciati (BR-Chor/Bamberg Symphony/Alice Coote)
- The Klassik-ohne-Grenzen Prizes – David Orlowsky/Singer Pur – Jeremiah; Spark – Downtown Illusions; Rolando Villazón Mexico!
- Symphonic Recording of the Year
  - 18th century – Charles Mackerras/Scottish Chamber Orchestra for Mozart Symphonies
  - 19th century – David Zinman/Tonhalle Orchester Zürich/WDR Rundfunkorchester Köln for Mahler: Symphony No. 8
  - 20th/21st century – Pierre Boulez/Wiener Philharmoniker for Song of the Night
- Concerto Recording of the Year
  - 18th century Sergio Azzolini/L'aura Soave Cremona – Vivaldi
  - 19th century

  - Organ – Stefan Bleicher/Douglas Boyd/Musikkollegium Winterthur – Rheinberger
  - Cello – Sol Gabetta – Elgar
  - Violin – Susanna Yoko Henkel/Duisburger Philharmoniker/Jonathan Darlington – Tchaikovsky

  - 20th/21st century – Hilary Hahn for Higdon & Tchaikovsky
- Opera Recording of the Year
  - 17th/18th century – Fabio Biondi/Europa Galante – Vivaldi: Ercole sul Termondonte
  - 19th century – Not awarded
  - 20th/21st century – Stefan Blunier/Beethoven Orchester Bonn/Chor des Theaters Bonn – Eugen d'Albert: Der Golem.
  - Operatic Arias & Duets – Bejun Mehta – Händel: Ombra Cara; René Pape/Staatskapelle Berlin: Wagner.
- Choral Recording of the Year
  - 16th/ 17th century – Christina Pluhar/L'Arpeggiata – Monteverdi:Vespro della Beate Virgine
  - 18th/19th century – Christoph Spering/Das Neue Orchester/Chorus Musicus Köln – Mendelssohn Bartholdy: Elias
  - 20th/21st century – Marcus Creed/SWR Vokalensemble Stuttgart – Heitor Villa-Lobos: Chorwerke
- Chamber Music Recording of the Year
  - 17th/18th century – Hille Perl/Dorothee Mields/Lee Santana – Loves Alchymie
  - 19th century – Artemis Quartet; Viktoria Mullova/Kristian Bezuidenhout
  - 20th/21st century

  - Mixed Ensemble – musikFabrik
  - Strings – Quatuor Ebène
  - Wind – Quintette Aquilon

- Solo Recording of the Year
  - 17th/18th century – Alexandre Tharaud – Scarlatti: Sonates
  - 19th century – Piotr Anderszewski – Schumann
  - 20th/21st century – Henrico Stewen (Marcel Punt) – Reger
- Song Recording of the Year – Diana Damrau – Strauss: Poesie
- Editorial Achievement of the Year – Ben van Oosten – Marcel Dupré: Orgelwerke
- World Premiere Recording of the Year – Manfred Honeck/Swedish Radio Symphony Orchestra – Braunfels: Jeanne D'Arc
- The Classics for Children Award – Thomas Honickel/Christian Firmbach/Beethoven Orchester Bonn – Komm, wir fahren nach Amerika
- Jury Awards for the Fostering of Young Talents – Not given
- Music DVD Recording of the Year
  - Opera – Cecilia Bartoli – Halévy: Clari
  - Documentary – Peter Rosen – A Surprise in Texas – The Thirteenth Van Cliburn International Piano Competition; Eric Schulz/Frank Gerdes – Carlos Kleiber – Traces to Nowhere
- Surround Performance of the Year – Christian Zacharias/Orchestre de Chambre de Lausanne – Mozart
- Bestseller of the Year – Lang Lang Live in Vienna
- Special Social Engagement Award – José Antonio Abreu
