= Vilde Frang =

Norwegian classical violinist (born 1986)

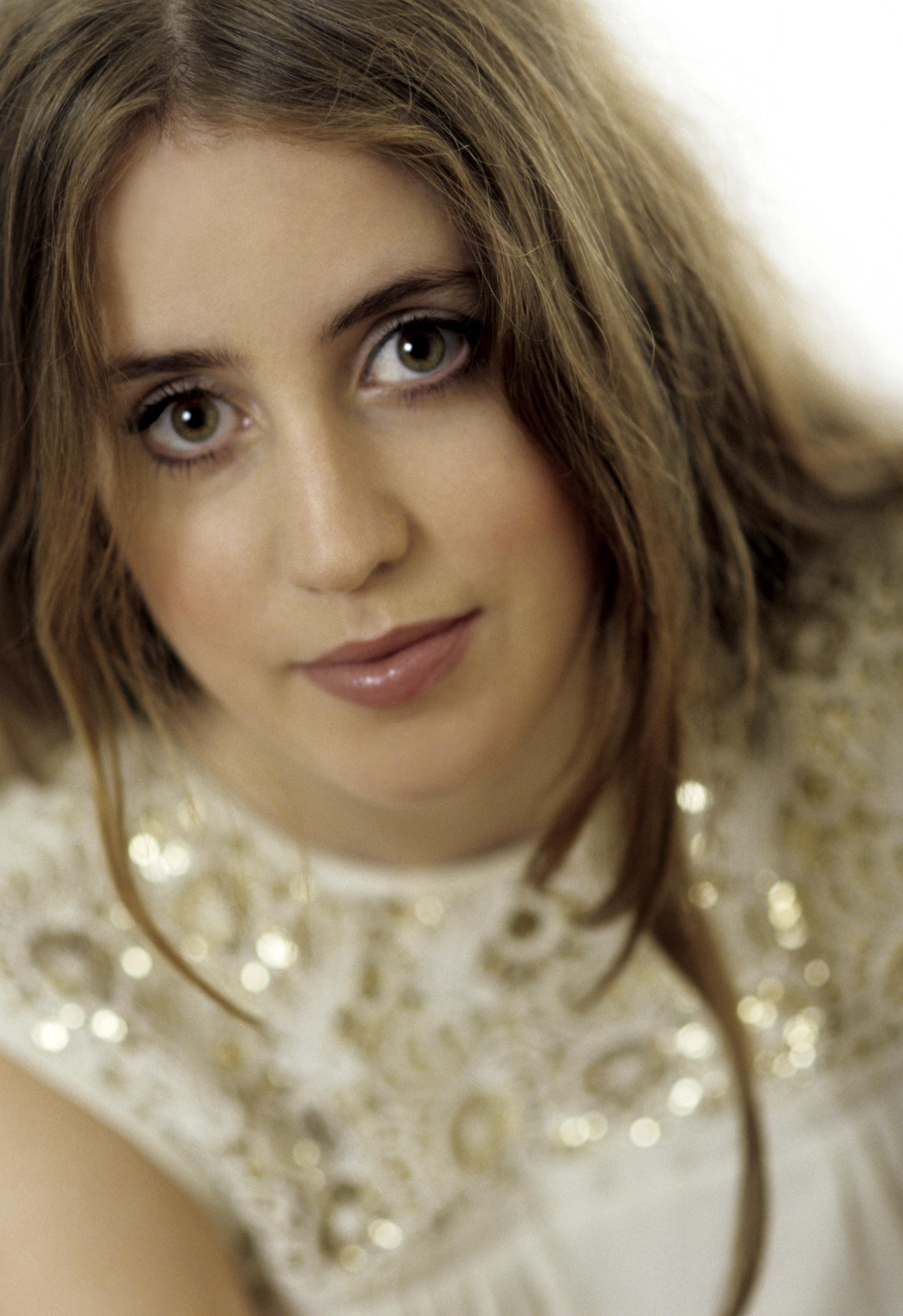
- Vilde Frang in 2017
- Born: 19 August 1986 (age 40); Oslo, Norway
- Education: Barratt Due Institute of Music; Kronberg Academy
- Occupation: Violinist

Vilde Frang Bjærke (born 19 August 1986) is a Norwegian classical violinist.

== Early life and education ==
Born in Oslo, Norway, Frang began playing the violin by the Suzuki method at the age of four. She grew up in a musical family with both her father and her sister playing the double bass. In the years 1993–2002 she studied with Stephan Barratt-Due, Alf Richard Kraggerud and Henning Kraggerud at the Barratt Due Institute of Music in Oslo.

Frang made her soloist debut at the age of ten with the Norwegian Radio Orchestra. In 1998 she was introduced to Anne-Sophie Mutter, who became her mentor and later appointed her a scholarship holder in the Anne-Sophie Mutter Foundation. She was aged twelve in 1999 when Mariss Jansons engaged her as a soloist with the Oslo Philharmonic.

From 2003 to 2009 Frang continued her studies in Germany, with Kolja Blacher at Hochschule für Musik und Theater Hamburg and Ana Chumachenco at the Kronberg Academy. Frang received a 2007 Borletti-Buitoni Trust Fellowship and also had lessons with Mitsuko Uchida in London.

== Career ==
In 2007, Frang's debut with the London Philharmonic Orchestra in their Eastbourne series led to a re-engagement in the following season, under Vladimir Jurowski at the Royal Festival Hall. In 2008, Vilde Frang signed exclusively to EMI Classics (now Warner Classics). Her debut album was released in 2009 and received high praise from critics and audiences alike, and she was named EMI Classics' Young Artist of the Year 2010. Her recordings for EMI / Warner Classics have received numerous awards including a Classical BRIT, Deutsche Schallplattenpreis twice, four ECHO Klassik Awards, two Edisson Klassiek Awards, Diapason d'Or and two Gramophone Awards.

Winner of the 2012 Credit Suisse Young Artist Award, Frang performed the Sibelius violin concerto with the Vienna Philharmonic under Bernard Haitink at the Lucerne Festival. In 2013 she made her London Proms debut, playing the Bruch Violin Concerto with the BBC Philharmonic under John Storgards at the Royal Albert Hall. In 2016, Frang performed the Mendelssohn Violin Concerto with the Berlin Philharmonic under Simon Rattle as part of their Europe Concert in Røros, Norway.

Frang has held a part-time professorship (professor II) at the Norwegian Academy of Music in Oslo since 2013. Until 2021 she has played an 1864 Jean-Baptiste Vuillaume violin. Since then she has performed on the 1734 'Rode' Guarneri 'del Gesù' violin, on loan from the Stretton Society.

== Awards ==
- Leonie Sonnings Musikfonds (2003)
- Ritter-Stiftung Grand Prize (2007)
- Borletti-Buitoni Trust fellowship (2007)
- The Prince Eugen Culture Prize, 2007 The Danish Queen Ingrid‘s Honorary Prize (2009)
- The Norwegian soloist prize (2009)
- Spellemannsprisen, Classical music. For Prokofiev & Sibelius: Violin Concertos. 2009
- Statoil's Classical Music Award (2010)
- Edison Klassiek Newcomer Award for Prokofiev & Sibelius: Violin Concertos .2011
- Echo Klassik Award, newcomer award violin for Grieg, Bartók & R.Strauss: Sonatas. 2011
- Classic Brit Newcomer Award for Prokofiev & Sibelius: Violin Concertos. 2011
- Crédit Suisse Young Artist Award (2012)
- Edison Klassiek Chamber Music Award for Grieg, Bartók & R. Straus: Sonatas. 2012
- Preis der Deutschen Schallplatten Kritik (2012) for Nielsen & Tchaikovsky Violin Concertos.
- Echo Klassik Award (2013)
- Echo Klassik Award (2015)
- Preis der Deutschen Schallplatten Kritik (2015) for Mozart Violin Concertos 1&5 and Sinfonia Concertante.
- Echo Klassik Award (2016)
- Gramophone Classical Music Award (2016)
- Diapason d'or de l'année (2018) for Bartók Violin Concerto No. 1 & Enescu Octet
- Grand Prix L'Acádemie Charles Cros (2018) for Bartók Violin Concerto No. 1 and Enescu Octet
- BBC Music Magazine Award (Chamber Award) 2020 for Veress String Trio & Bartók Piano Quintet.
- Gramophone Classical Music Award (Chamber Category) (2020) for Veress String Trio & Bartók Piano Quintet.
- ICMA (International Classical Music Award) (Concertos Category) (2023) for Beethoven & Stravinsky Violin Concertos.
- Preis der Deutschen Schallplatten Kritik (2023) for Beethoven & Stravinsky Violin Concertos.
- ICMA (International Classical Music Award) (Concertos Category) (2025) for Elgar Violin Concerto.
- BBC Music Magazine Award (Concerto Award) 2025 for Elgar Violin Concerto.
- Gramophone Classical Music Award (Concerto Award) 2025 for Elgar Violin Concerto.

== Discography ==
- Prokofiev & Sibelius: Violin Concertos (2009). With WDR Sinfonieorchester Köln and Thomas Søndergård (conductor). EMI Classics
- Grieg, Bartók, R. Strauss: Violin Sonatas (2011). With Michail Lifits (piano). EMI Classics
- Nielsen & Tchaikovsky: Violin Concertos (2012). With Danish National Symphony Orchestra and Eivind Gullberg Jensen (conductor). EMI Classics
- Mozart: Violin Concertos 1&5 and Sinfonia Concertante (2015). With Arcangelo, Jonathan Cohen (conductor) and Maxim Rysanov (viola). Warner Classics
- Korngold & Britten: Violin Concertos (2016). With Frankfurt Radio Symphony and James Gaffigan (conductor). Warner Classics
- Homage (2017). With José Gallardo. (piano). Warner Classics
- Bartók Violin Concerto No.1 & Enescu Octet (2018). With Orchestre Philharmonique de Radio France, Mikko Franck (conductor), Erik Schumann, Gabriel Le Magadure, Rosanne Philippens, violins; Lawrence Power, Lily Francis, violas; Nicolas Altstaedt and Jan-Erik Gustafsson, cellos. Warner Classics
- Veress: String Trio & Bartók: Piano Quintet (2019). With Barnabás Kelemen, violin; Katalin Kokas and Lawrence Power, violas; Nicolas Altstaedt, cello and Alexander Lonquich, piano. Alpha Classics
- Paganini & Schubert: Works for violin and piano (2019). With Michail Lifits (piano). Warner Classics
- Beethoven: Songs and Folksongs (2020). With Ian Bostridge (song), Antonio Pappano (piano) and Nicolas Altstaedt (cello). Warner Classics
- Beethoven & Stravinsky: Violin Concertos (2022). With The Deutsche Kammerphilharmonie Bremen and Pekka Kuusisto (conductor). Warner Classics
- Elgar: Violin Concerto (2024). With Deutsches Symphonie-Orchester Berlin and Robin Ticciati (conductor). Warner Classics

Awards
Preceded by Trondheim Soloists	Recipient of the classical music Spellemannprisen; 2017	Succeeded by Tora Augestad & Oslo Philharmonic Orchestra
