= Hemsing =

Hemsing is a surname. Notable people with the surname include:

- Eldbjørg Hemsing (born 1990), Norwegian violinist
- Henk Hemsing (1891–1971), Dutch diver
- Ragnhild Hemsing (born 1988), Norwegian violinist, sister of Eldbjørg
