= Barratt Due Institute of Music =

Music education institute in Oslo

- Barratt Due musikkinstitutt
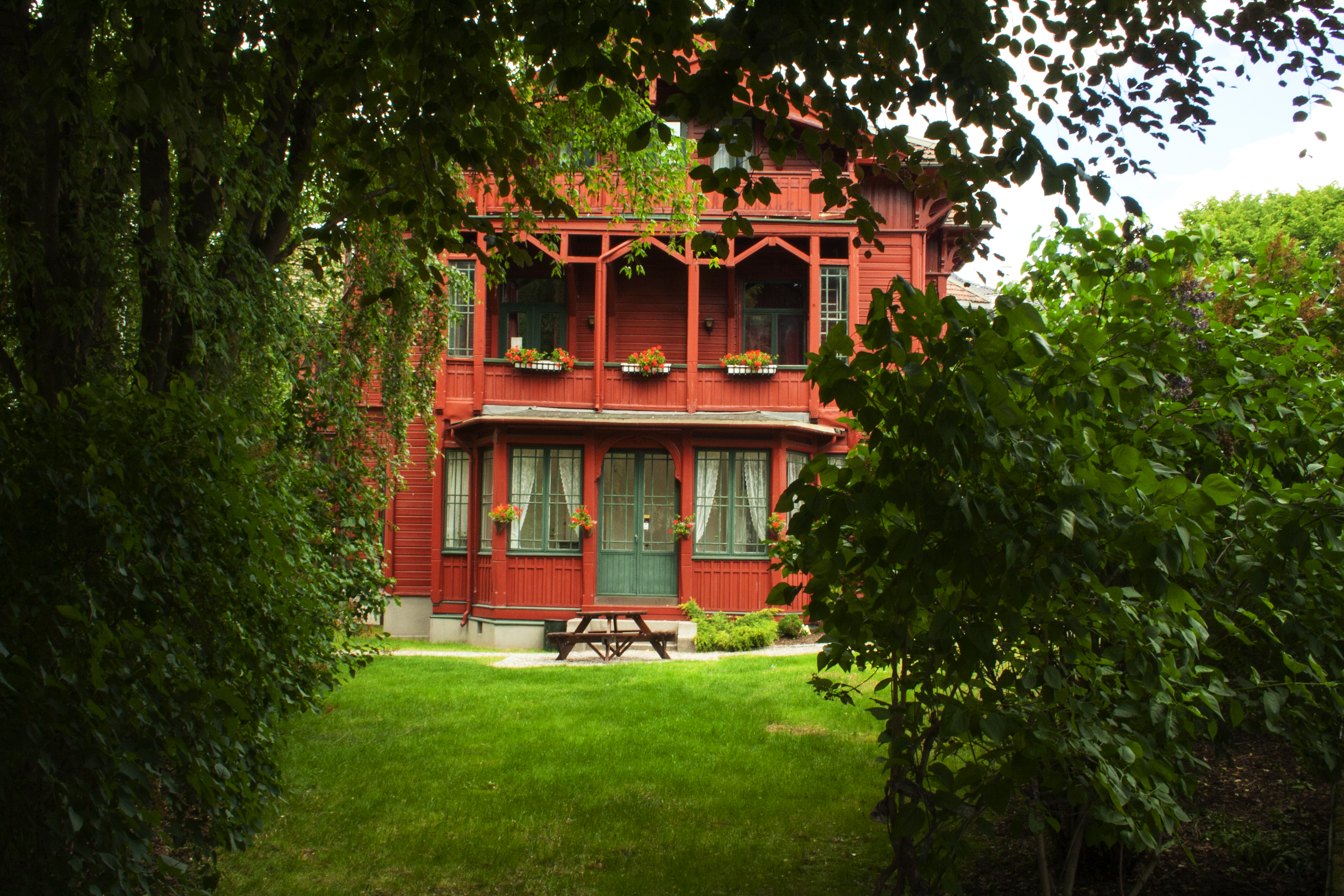
- Type: Private foundation, Music school and college
- Established: 1927; 99 years ago
- Rector: Stephan Barratt-Due; Deputy rector Alf Richard Kraggerud
- Director: Harald Hjort
- Administrative staff: 125 (2015) (as a total for all departments)
- Students: 90 (2015) (in addition to 90 students in Unge Talenter, 100 students in Musikk på Majorstuen, 50 students in Musikkskoleavdelingen, and 200 students in Musikkbarnehagen)
- Location: Oslo, Norway; 59°55′43.07″N 10°43′38.63″E
- Website: www.barrattdue.no

The Barratt Due Institute of Music in Oslo, Norway, is a music education institute founded in 1927 by pianist Mary Barratt Due and violinist Henrik Adam Due. It is situated in Fagerborg in Oslo and is a private foundation which receives government funding for parts of its activities. The institute provides music education for many age groups, including infants and children, school-aged adolescents, and undergraduate and postgraduate students.

The institute's motto is "From music kindergarten to concert podium," which sums up the philosophy that constitutes the foundation on which their education system is built. Children receive musical training from an early age, and students are offered education on undergraduate and postgraduate levels, preparing them for the professional musical career and arena. This education model has enabled Barratt Due to establish itself as an important institution and contribute largely to the Norwegian classical music industry at least for the past three generations.

Stephan Barratt-Due is the Barratt Due's artistic director, and leads the institute's ensemble-in-residence, Oslo Camerata.

== History ==
Barratt Dues Musikkinstitutt (Barratt Due Institute of Music) was founded on 18 September 1927 in the residence of Henrik Due and Mary Barratt Due, in 18 Vallegata, St. Hanshaugen. Classes and lessons were then held in their apartment home. Both musicians were well-established and acknowledged during their time, and the family moved into Lyder Sagens gate 2 on 26 October 1931, where the institute is located today. Certain traditions, such as the annual Christmas concert, were held since 1930. In January 1931, the music kindergarten was established, becoming the first of its kind in the country and leading to the establishment of the motto "From music kindergarten to concert podium" in the mid-1930s. Today it is the oldest music kindergarten still in operation in Norway.

During World War II, Barratt Dues musikkinstitutt was a meeting place for those who were interested in culture and what was considered Degenerate music, which was banned during the war.

In 1985, Barratt Dues Juniororkester and Barratt Dues Symfoniorkester were established, and in 1986 the institute was turned into a foundation. Stephan Barratt-Due Jr. became the rector and artistic director of the institute in 1985.

== Programs ==
Høyskolen Barratt Due (Barratt Due College) offers Bachelor and master's degree studies in Music Performance, in addition to PPU (Practical Pedagogical Education) and a FE (Further Education) course in music didactics.

- Unge Talenter (Young Talents) is catered towards the youths in the ages of 10 to 19 with a particular interest and talent in music. The programme includes instrumental lessons, ensemble activities and music theory.
- Musikk på Majorstuen is a programme for school-aged children residing in Oslo, and provides primary education that particularly facilitates the needs of talented youths within classical music. This programme is a collaboration between Barratt Due and Majorstuen Skole.
- Musikkskolen BD (Barratt Due Music School) offers individual instrumental lessons for newbeginning pupils in the ages of 6 to 9 in string instruments, piano, oboe and bassoon.
- Musikkbarnehage (Music Kindergarten) is organised into age-divided groups for young children in the ages of 0 to 5. The training and the learning material is adjusted to the children's personal development levels. Through various stimulating activities such as song, dance and improvisation, the children become familiar with music and its creative forms, and may develop a musical interest and basic musical skills that create the foundation for further training. The music kindergarten has been a crucial part of Barratt Due's educational offers since the beginning, and supports the institute's philosophy that music knows no age limits.

== Affiliated orchestras and ensembles ==
- Oslo Camerata: Barratt Due's ensemble-in-residence, a professional orchestra in which a selection of students may participate.
- Barratt Dues Kammerfilharmoni: A small philharmonic orchestra composed of undergraduate and postgraduate students.
- Barratt Dues Vokalensemble: A chamber choir composed of all the college students in vocal studies, led by Lars Notto Birkeland.
- Barratt Dues Messingensemble: A brass ensemble composed of all the college students in brass studies, led by Sverre Riise.
- Barratt Dues Unge Symfoniorkester: A full symphony orchestra composed of students of Unge Talenter and/or under 20 years old, led by Alf Richard Kraggerud.
- Barratt Dues Juniororkester: A junior string orchestra composed of students of Unge Talenter and/or between the ages of 13 and 19, who come from all around the country; led by Soon-Mi Chung.
- Barratt Dues Juniorensemble: A junior string orchestra composed mainly of students between the ages of 12 and 16, led by Sigyn Fossnes.
- Barratt Dues Barneorkester: A junior string orchestra composed of children under 13 years old, led by Torfinn Hoffart.

== Notable alumni and faculty ==
Current and former students
- Stephan Henrik Barratt-Due
- Eva Knardahl
- Terje Venaas
- Stephan Barratt-Due
- Henning Kraggerud
- Vilde Frang
- Hilde Hefte
- Eldbjørg Hemsing
- Ragnhild Hemsing
- Alexander Rybak
- Didrik Solli-Tangen
- Annar Follesø
- Øyvind Bjorå
- Mari Silje Salomonsen
- Christian Ihle Hadland
- Felix Peikli
- Tine Thing Helseth
- Frode Barth
- Catharina Chen
- Guro Kleven Hagen
- Sara Chen
- Ludvig Gudim
- Sonoko Miriam Shimano Welde
- Eivind Holstmark Ringstad
- Birgitta Elisa Oftestad

Current and former teachers
- Henrik Adam Due
- Mary Barratt Due
- Stephan Henrik Barratt-Due
- Ørnulf Gulbransen
- Jiri Hlinka
- Stephan Barratt-Due
- Soon-Mi Chung
- Alf Richard Kraggerud
- Henning Kraggerud
- Arnulf Naur Nilsen
- Tove Sinding-Larsen
- Michael Endres
- Fredrik Fors
- Solveig Kringlebotn
- Wolfgang Plagge
