= Due =

Due, DUE or dues may refer to:

== Music ==
- "Due", on Raf's 1993 album Cannibali
- "Due", on Mindless Self Indulgence's 2008 album If

== Science and technology ==
- DUE or DNA unwinding element, the site of DNA helix splitting
- DÜE, Data circuit-terminating equipment (German: Datenübertragungseinrichtung)

== Entertainment ==
- Due, a character in the anime Magical Girl Lyrical Nanoha Strikers

== Media ==
- Rai Due, an Italian television channel
- Telegiornale Due, an Italian news program broadcast on Rai 2
- Teledue, an Italian television channel
- RSI Rete Due, a Swiss Italian-language radio station

== Other uses ==
- Due (surname), including a list of people so named
- Due, Georgia, United States, a ghost town
- Dues, a membership fee
  - Union dues, to a trade union
- Umiray Dumaget language, spoken in the Philippines (ISO 636:due)

== See also ==
- Doo (disambiguation)
- Due date (disambiguation)
- Deus (disambiguation)
