= Annar Follesø =

Norwegian violinist

- Born: December 29, 1972 (age 52)
- Genres: Baroque
- Occupation: Violinist
- Instrument: Violin
- Website: annar.no

Annar Follesø (born December 29, 1972) is a Norwegian violinist.

Follesø studied with Soon-Mi Chung and Stephan Barratt-Due at the Barratt Due Music Institute, and with Mauricio Fuks at Indiana University.

In 1998 he won the violin prize at the International Summer Academy in Salzburg for his interpretation of Bartók's solo sonata, and his Bartók interpretations have won him wide recognition. He has since performed in the United States, Russia, China, Italy, France, Austria and South Korea. Notable performances include the premiere of Ole Bull’s La verbena de San Juan at the Bergen International Festival in 2007, and the 2013 premiere of the reconstructed work Mountains of Norway with the Norwegian Radio Orchestra at the same event. In 2014, Follesø performed with Wolfgang Plagge at the Festival Internacional Cervantino and in 2015 returned to the Bergen International Festival. Together with composer and pianist Plagge, Annar Follesø is artistic director of the Sunnmøre Chamber Music Festival, which began in 2010.

His first album was a collection of works by Bartok performed with Plagge, released in 2003. In 2010, he released a recording of Ole Bull's Violin Concertos in collaboration with the Grieg Society of Great Britain. Both records are on the 2L label.

== See also ==
- Roberto Maxham (November 2010). "Classical Recordings - Bull: "Sæterjentens Søndag"; Violin Concerto in A; "Concerto Fantastico in e"; "I Ensomme Stunde"; "La Verbena de San Juan"; "Et Sæterbesøg"". Fanfare. 34 (2): 306–307.
