= Thomas Agerfeldt Olesen =

Danish composer (born 1969)

Thomas Agerfeldt Olesen (born December 3, 1969) is a Danish composer and cellist.

Thomas Agerfeldt Olesen studied cello at the Royal Academy of Music in Aarhus from 1991 to 1998, and composition with Karl Aage Rasmussen, Olav Anton Thommesen, Henryk Górecki, and Poul Ruders in Aarhus, Katowice, and London during the period 1998–2003.

Thomas Agerfeldt Olesen’s primary artistic work takes place in the tension between tradition and renewal, and he often uses this tension quite concretely as a kind of driving force and generator of material in his music. One example is his Weihnachtsoratorium, which he wrote with Bach’s score at his side while, according to his own statement, “carefully making sure not to copy a single phrase from the original work.” Should it nevertheless happen, “it would occur after thorough consideration.”

Another example of the dialectic between tradition and renewal can be seen in his extensive production of string quartets. Thomas Agerfeldt Olesen has written 11 string quartets for a number of the most internationally renowned ensembles, including Quartetto di Cremona, the Henschel Quartet, and in Denmark the Danish String Quartet and Nightingale String Quartet.

Another major field of activity is orchestral music. Agerfeldt Olesen has had a fruitful collaboration with the Danish National Symphony Orchestra (DRSO). For the DRSO and violinist Simone Lamsma, he wrote his Violin Concerto in 2024; for the DRSO and cellist Johannes Moser, his Cello Concerto in 2017; and in 2011 the orchestral work “Der Wind bläset wo er will.” In addition to the DRSO, he has collaborated with all the Danish regional orchestras, the SWR Symphony Orchestra Stuttgart, the Vancouver Symphony Orchestra, the Helsinki Philharmonic, and the Helsingborg Symphony Orchestra.

In 2013, The Danish National Opera in Aarhus premiered his opera “The Picture of Dorian Gray.” The opera’s singers are doubled on stage by dancers, making the production a Gesamtkunstwerk (total work of art).Weihnachtsoratorium (2017), as already described, is a paraphrase of J.S. Bach’s work of the same name. Following typical Danish tradition, only the first three cantatas are paraphrased. The original text from Bach’s oratorio is retained, as are the characteristic features of each movement—musical building blocks are reinterpreted and activated from a contemporary perspective.

In 1997, Thomas Agerfeldt Olesen received the Danish Arts Foundation’s three-year working grant. He was awarded the Carl Nielsen Prize in 2013, the Danish Arts Foundation Prize for Music Dramatic Composition in 2013 for “The Picture of Dorian Gray,” the Haakon Børresen Grant in 2013, the Laurens Bogtman Foundation Honorary Award, and the Danish Composers’ Society Grant in 2013. In 2014, “The Picture of Dorian Gray” was nominated for a Reumert Award for Best Opera. In 2018, “Weihnachtsoratorium” was nominated for the Nordic Council Music Prize. In 2020, he received the lifelong honorary grant from the Danish Arts Foundation.

== Works ==
- String Quartet No. 11 (2025)
- Liebestrennung for voice and large ensemble (2025)
- Violin Concerto (2024)
- String Quartet No. 10 (2024)
- String Quartet No. 9 (2023)
- Piano Sonata (2023)
- Missa Brevis for choir, solo alto, violin and organ (2021)
- The Song of Love for choir, violin and guitar (2021)
- Trennungsbriefe for voice and large ensemble (2021)
- String Quartet No. 8 “Schmetterling an meinem Fenster” (2019)
- Berceuse for guitar duo (2019)
- Sinfonia Concertante (2018)
- Glasperlenspiel for violin, cello and piano (2018)
- Cello Concerto (2016)
- String Quartet No. 6 (2013)
- String Quartet No. 7 “The Extinguishable” (2012)
- Overture to Ludwig van Beethoven’s 6th Symphony for 2 horns, 2 trumpets, 2 trombones and timpani (2012)
- String Quartet No. 5 “Plappergeister” (2011)
- Der Wind bläset wo er will (2010)
- Love Letters for voice and large ensemble (2009)
- Seven Audio Plays for clarinet, trombone, percussion, piano, cello and double bass (2009)
- TAO Meditation II for saxophone quartet (2007)
- 6 Sonatas for piano (2007)
- Stralsund for solo flute and playback (2006)
- Königswinter for large chamber ensemble (2005)
- Nordrhrein-Westfalen for clarinet and piano (2005)
- Bochum for piano and string quartet (2004)
- Von Schwelle zu Schwelle for mezzo-soprano and piano (2004)
- Steinfeld – Piano Concerto (2004)
- The Gosling for orchestra (2003)
- Small Miracle Prelude for piano (2003)
- Viktor’s Golgatha for narrator, strings and percussion (2003)
- Ground for 15 strings (2002)
- All as One for sinfonietta (2000)
- Dedications for violin, cello and piano (2000)
- Chamber’s Music (2000)
- String Quartet No. 4 “Concordia Discors” (1999)
- Tonkraftwerk for sinfonietta (1998–99)
- De Spiritu Sancto for flute, bass clarinet, violin, cello and percussion (1998)
- Die Himmlischen Heerscharen for flute, clarinet, percussion, guitar, harpsichord, violin and cello (1998)
- String Quartet No. 3 “Seven Angels” (1997)
- Trio for flute and piano (1997)
- Geatmete Geschichte for flute, clarinet, horn, percussion, piano, violin, cello and double bass (1996)
