= Ray Chen =

Taiwanese-Australian violinist (born 1989)

Ray Chen 陳銳
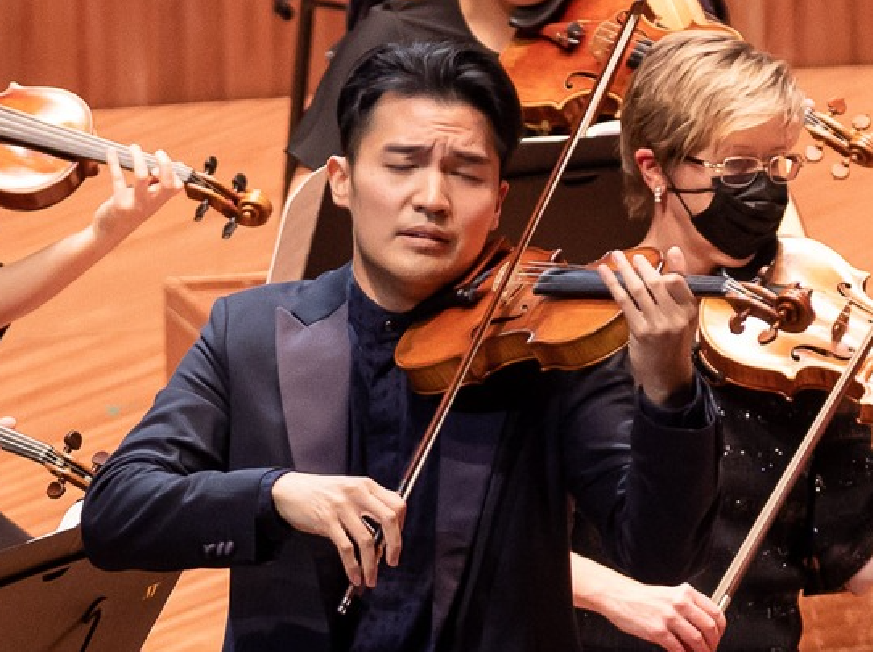
- Chen performing at the Sydney Opera House in 2022

Background information
- Born: 6 March 1989 (age 37); Taipei, Taiwan
- Genre: Classical
- Occupation: Musician
- Instrument: Violin
- Years active: 1997–present
- Labels: Decca Classics; Sony Classical
- Website: raychenviolin.com

Chinese name
- Traditional Chinese: 陳銳
- Simplified Chinese: 陈锐
Transcriptions
Standard Mandarin
- Hanyu Pinyin: Chén Ruì

Ray Chen (Chinese: 陳銳; pinyin: Chén Ruì; born 6 March 1989) is a Taiwanese-Australian violinist and YouTuber. He was the winner of the 2008 International Yehudi Menuhin Violin Competition and the 2009 Queen Elisabeth Competition. Since then, he has regularly collaborated with the world's foremost orchestras and appeared at renowned concert halls.

== Early life and education ==
Born in Taipei, Taiwan, Chen began learning the violin at the age of four. Within five years he completed all 10 levels of the Suzuki violin method in Brisbane, where he grew up. At the age of eight, Chen performed as a soloist with the Queensland Philharmonic Orchestra. He was also invited to perform at the opening celebration concert of the 1998 Winter Olympics in Nagano, Japan. Early on, his violin teachers included Kerry Smith and Peter Zhang.

In 1999, Chen was chosen as the 4MBS's Young Space Musician of the Year in Brisbane. He also received the Australian Music Examinations Board's Sydney May Memorial Scholarship and was awarded his Licentiate Diploma of Music with distinction at age eleven. In 2002, he won the Australian National Youth Concerto Competition and in 2005, the Kendall National Violin Competition. In 2004, he received the Third Prize at the junior division of the Yehudi Menuhin International Competition.

In 2010, Chen graduated from the Curtis Institute of Music in Philadelphia with a Bachelor of Music, where he studied with Aaron Rosand. He also undertook summer studies at the Encore School for Strings with David Cerone and Robert Lipsett, and at the Aspen Music Festival with Cho-Liang Lin and Paul Kantor on a full tuition fellowship.

== Career ==
In 2008, Chen won the First Prize in the senior division of the Yehudi Menuhin International Competition in Cardiff, Wales. At the competition, he came to the attention of jury member Maxim Vengerov, who engaged him for debuts with the Mariinsky Theatre Orchestra and the Azerbaijan State Symphony Orchestra at the International Rostropovich Festival in Baku. Following this, he won the 2008/09 Young Concert Artists International Auditions in New York and was subsequently loaned the 1721 Macmillan Stradivarius.

In 2009, Chen won the First Prize at the Queen Elisabeth Competition in Brussels, where he was the youngest participant. Following the competition, he immediately embarked on a concert tour, performing with the Antwerp Symphony Orchestra under Jaap van Zweden, the National Orchestra of Belgium under Rumon Gamba, and the Orchestre Philharmonique du Luxembourg under Emmanuel Krivine, as well as in recitals throughout Belgium. He was also given a three-year loan of the 1708 Huggins Stradivarius from the Nippon Music Foundation.

In 2010, Chen was signed by Sony Classical. His first album with the label, Virtuoso, won him the Newcomer Award at the 2011 Echo Klassik Awards.

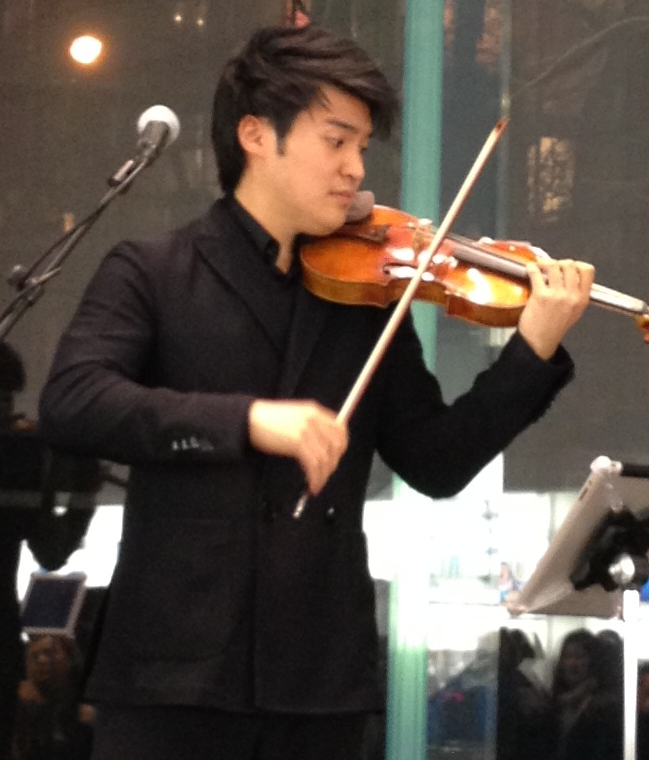
Chen performing at Apple Fifth Avenue in 2012

In 2012, Chen was invited to perform at the annual Nobel Prize Concert, playing Max Bruch's Violin Concerto in G minor with the Royal Stockholm Philharmonic Orchestra and Christoph Eschenbach.

On Bastille Day in 2015, Chen performed live for an audience of 800,000 people at Champ de Mars. He was accompanied by the Orchestre National de France and Daniele Gatti.

In 2016, Chen founded the Made in Berlin string quartet along with three string players from the Berlin Philharmonic, Noah Bendix-Balgley, Amihai Grosz, and Stephan Koncz. In April of that year, Chen was the youngest juror ever of the Menuhin Competition.

In January 2017, Chen was signed by Decca Classics. His first album with the label, The Golden Age, was nominated for an ARIA Music Award for Best Classical Album.

In the 2017/18 season, Chen was an “Artist Focus” for the Berlin Radio Symphony Orchestra. In 2018, he appeared on an episode of Amazon Prime's television series, Mozart in the Jungle.

In November 2020, Chen opened the Golden Horse Awards ceremony.

== Instruments ==
Following short-term loans of both the Macmillan and Huggins Stradivarius violins, Chen was the recipient of the 1715 Joachim Stradivarius from the Nippon Music Foundation. From 2019 to 2022, he played on the 1735 Samazeuilh Stradivarius from Nippon.

On 12 September 2022, Chen announced that he had received the 1714 Dolphin Stradivarius, which was loaned by the Nippon Music Foundation for a year. The violin was formerly played by Jascha Heifetz.

Recently, The "Dolphin" has been loaned to Timothy Chooi and a 1727 Stradivarius has become one of Ray's favourite instruments so far and is the instrument he currently performs on.

== Non-classical collaborations ==
On November 20, 2021, Sting's song "What Could Have Been", featuring Chen, was featured in the third act of the League of Legends animated series Arcane; the single was released the same day. Both Sting and Chen opened The Game Awards 2021 with the song.

In 2022, Ray was one of the collaborators on Jay Chou's song and video, "Greatest Works of Art," which rose to number one in China and garnered over 500 million views on Weibo and other Chinese streaming services within 48 hours of release.

== Other ventures ==
Chen is frequently noted for his online presence, being one of the first classical musicians of his stature to embrace social media. He began making comedy videos on his Facebook page in 2014, and soon began creating humorous content for his YouTube channel relating to violin playing and classical music. The YouTube classical music comedy duo TwoSetViolin cite Chen as an influence in their decision to start doing comedy on their channel and Chen has appeared on their channel numerous times. He continues to create content for Instagram and other social media platforms, and hosts both a Discord and Reddit community as well.

An ambassador for Sony Electronics, Chen is a music consultant at Riot Games and is in a multi-year marketing partnership with the Italian fashion house, Armani. He has also been featured in Vogue Magazine, written a blog for RCS Rizzoli, and designed a violin case for Gewa.

In 2021, Chen launched an app with developer Rose Xi under the title Pocket Conservatory. Conceived as a community-building and practice motivation app for musicians, Pocket attracted 3,500 users immediately (with another 4,000 on the waitlist) in 117 countries. In 2022, Pocket rebranded as Tonic and continued to add users in preparation for a wider launch.

== Discography ==
=== Albums ===
Title	Album details	Peak chart positions
Title	Album details	AUS
Stravinsky: Diversions – Music for Violin & Piano	Released: 2010; Format: CD; Label: Melba Recordings	—
Virtuoso	Released: 2011; Format: CD; Label: Sony Classical	—
Tchaikovsky & Mendelssohn: Violin Concertos (with Daniel Harding and the Swedish Radio Symphony Orchestra)	Released: 2012; Format: CD; Label: Sony Classical	—
Mozart: Violin Concertos & Sonata (with Christoph Eschenbach and the Schleswig-Holstein Festival Orchestra)	Released: 2014; Format: CD; Label: Sony Classical	—
Ravel: Complete Orchestral Works (with Lionel Bringuier and the Tonhalle-Orchester Zürich)	Released: 2016; Format: CD; Label: Deutsche Grammophon	—
The Golden Age	Released: 2018; Format: CD; Label: Decca Classics	—
The Song of Names (Original Motion Picture Soundtrack)	Released: 2019; Format: CD; Label: Decca Classics	—
Solace	Released: 2020; Format: Digital; Label: Decca Classics	—
Player 1 (with Cristian Măcelaru and the Royal Philharmonic Orchestra)	Released: 2024; Format: CD; Label: Decca Classics	60

== Awards and nominations ==
=== ARIA Music Awards ===
The ARIA Music Awards are presented annually from 1987 by the Australian Recording Industry Association (ARIA).

Year	Nominee / work	Award	Result	Ref.
2018	The Golden Age	Best Classical Album	Nominated	

=== ECHO Klassik Awards ===
The ECHO Klassik Awards was presented annually from 1994 until 2017 by the Deutsche Phono-Akademie.

Year	Nominee / work	Award	Result	Ref.
2011	Virtuoso	Newcomer Award	Won	

=== Forbes 30 Under 30 ===
In 2017, Chen was selected to be included in Forbes 30 Under 30 under the Entertainment and Sports category for Asia.
