= Eldbjørg Hemsing =

Norwegian violinist (born 1990)

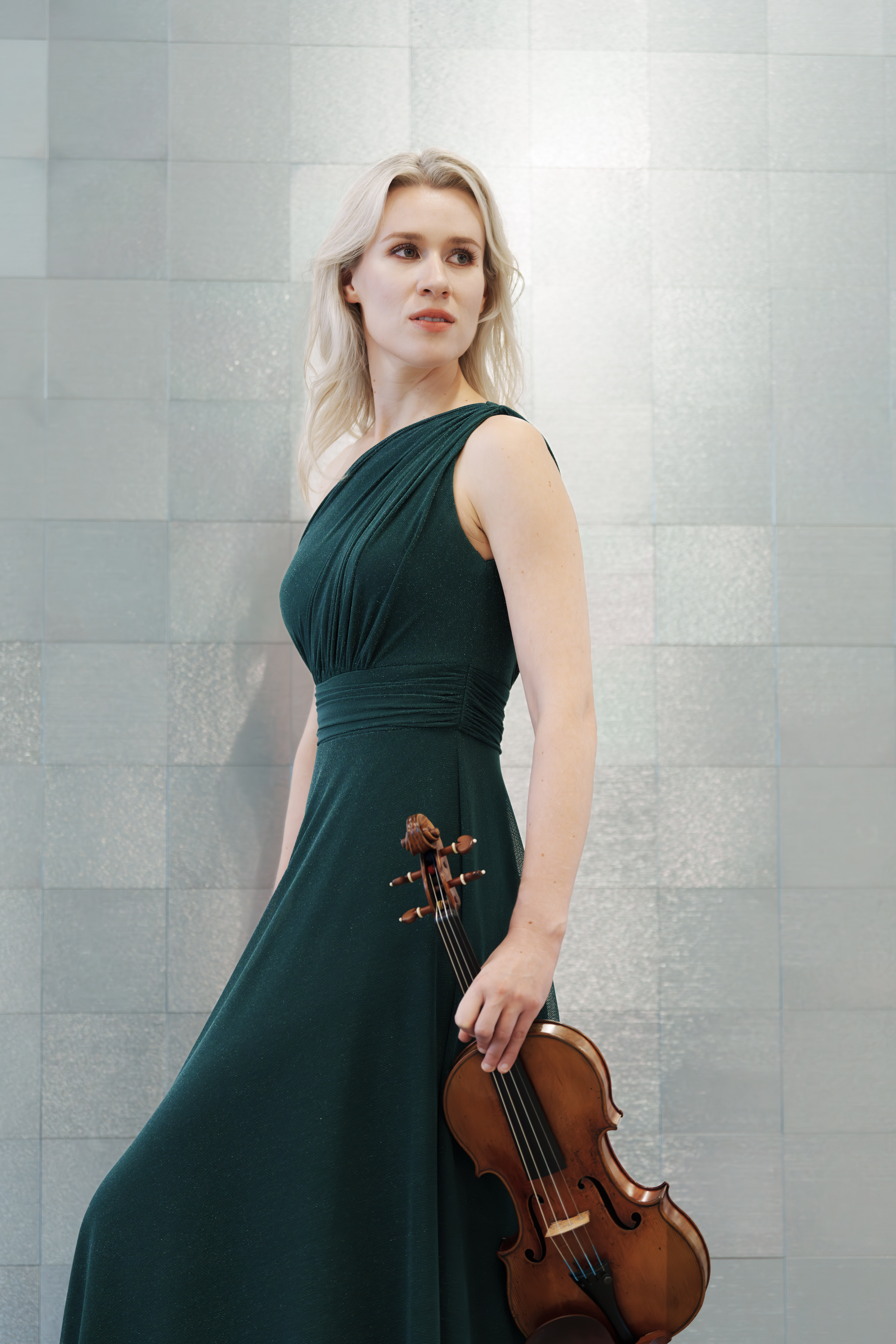

Background information
- Born: 16 February 1990 (age 36); Valdres, Oppland
- Origin: Norway
- Genre: Classical music
- Occupation: Violinist
- Instruments: 1707 "Rivaz, Baron Gutmann" Stradivari violin, Hardanger fiddle
- Years active: 1996–present
- Label: Sony Classical Records
- Website: www.eldbjorgmusic.com

Eldbjørg Hemsing (born 16 February 1990) is a Norwegian violinist known for her interpretations of both classical and contemporary repertoire. She has premiered numerous works by composers such as Tan Dun and Anders Hillborg and has performed at international venues, including the Nobel Peace Prize Ceremony and the United Nations. Hemsing has released several recordings and is involved in initiatives promoting classical music to broader audiences. She is the younger sister of the Norwegian violinist Ragnhild Hemsing.

== Early life and education ==
Born in Valdres, Norway, Hemsing began playing the violin at the age of five. Her mother, Bente Hemsing, was also a violinist and became her first teacher.

Hemsing performed for the Norwegian royal family by the age of six. At seven-years-old, she was accepted into the Barratt Due Institute of Music in Oslo, where she studied under Alf Richard Kraggerud and Stephan Barratt-Due. She later trained with Professor Boris Kuschnir. In 2012, she performed at the Nobel Peace Prize Concert in Oslo.

== Career ==
Hemsing has performed with orchestras such as the Oslo Philharmonic, Vienna Symphony, MDR Leipzig Radio Symphony Orchestra, and Shanghai Philharmonic Orchestra. She has appeared at venues including Lincoln Center, Kennedy Center, Wigmore Hall, and the National Centre for the Performing Arts in Beijing.

She maintains a close collaboration with composer Tan Dun, performing his Hero Concerto with the Netherlands Symphony Orchestra and the MDR Leipzig Radio Symphony Orchestra. She premiered his Triple Resurrection Concerto in Leipzig and Shanghai with the Shanghai Philharmonic Orchestra. In 2010, she premiered Tan Dun's violin concerto The Love with the Trondheim Symphony Orchestra at the World Expo in Shanghai. She also premiered his The Fire Rituals with the Chinese National Orchestra at the National Centre for the Performing Arts (China).

In 2021, she recorded Anders Hillborg’s Violin Concerto No. 2 and Liquid Marble with the Swedish Radio Symphony Orchestra under Esa-Pekka Salonen; the album was released in 2024 and won the Spellemannprisen for Classical Music that year.

In 2023, Hemsing released Arctic with the Arctic Philharmonic and conductor Christian Kluxen, a project highlighting the natural soundscapes of the Arctic region. The album received the Opus Klassik Award in the "Classic without Limits".

Her discography also includes a 2020 recording of Edvard Grieg’s Violin Sonatas with pianist Simon Trpčeski, featuring her own composition "Homecoming," which won the Spellemannprisen for Classical Music in 2020.

In 2022, she signed with Sony Classical, and later, in 2024, she was signed by Epstein Fox Performances.

== Projects and advocacy ==
Hemsing co-founded Hemsing Festival in Valdres, and serves as artistic director of SPIRE, a mentoring program for young artists. She is also a senior artistic advisor for the Advisory Board for the Arts.

== Instrument ==
Hemsing plays a 1707 Antonio Stradivari violin, known as the "Rivaz, Baron Gutmann," on loan from the Dextra Musica Foundation. She also plays the traditional Norwegian Hardanger fiddle.

== Notable recordings ==
Hemsing's recording of a violin concerto by Hjalmar Borgstrøm with Wiener Symphoniker, directed by Olari Elts, was released worldwide by BIS in 2018, and included performances by Norwegian Arctic Philharmonic Orchestra (conductor Christian Lindberg); Szczecin Philharmonic (conductor Rune Bergmann); Bergen International Festival in Norway; and Paavo Järvi's Pärnu Festival in Estonia.

In 2020, Hemsing released a recording of Edvard Grieg’s Violin Sonatas with pianist Simon Trpčeski. The album also featured her own composition, Homecoming, and was awarded the 2020 Spellemannprisen in the Classical Music category.

In 2023, she released an album, Arctic, recorded with the Arctic Philharmonic and Christian Kluxen. The album won the Opus Klassik Award in the category Classic without Limits.

In 2021, Hemsing recorded Anders Hillborg’s Violin Concerto No. 2 and Liquid Marble with the Swedish Radio Symphony Orchestra, conducted by Esa-Pekka Salonen. The album was released in 2024 and received the Spellemannprisen in the Classical Music category the same year.

== Discography ==
=== Albums ===
- 2011: Eldbjørg Hemsing, Kvarts, Ragnhild Hemsing, Varde (Kvarts)
- 2018: Eldbjørg Hemsing, Wiener Symphoniker, Olari Elts: Hjalmar Borgstrøm, Violin Concerto op. 25/Shostakovich, Violin Concerto No. 1 (BIS)
- 2018: Eldbjørg Hemsing, Antwerp Symphony Orchestra, Alan Buribayev: Dvořák & Suk, Works for Violin & Orchestra (BIS)
- 2019: Eldbjørg Hemsing, Oslo Philharmonic: Tan Dun, Fire Ritual, Violin Concertos (BIS)
- 2020: Eldbjørg Hemsing, Epic Orchestra: New Sound of Classical
- 2020: Eldbjørg Hemsing, Simon Trpčeski: Grieg, The Violin Sonatas (BIS)
- 2023: Eldbjørg Hemsing, GBH Music presents Live at GBH
- 2023: Eldbjørg Hemsing: Arctic
- 2024: Eldbjørg Hemsing, Stavanger Symphony Orchestra, Rolf Wallin: Five Seasons, Stride & Other Orchestral Works
- 2024: Eldbjørg Hemsing, Esa-Pekka Salonen, Swedish Radio Symphony Orchestra, Anders Hillborg: Violin Concerto No. 2/Liquid Marble

=== Singles ===
- 2019: Eldbjørg Hemsing, Michael England, NDR Radiophilharmonie: Max Richter, The Four Seasons Recomposed: Spring 1
- 2020: Eldbjørg Hemsing, Dirk Maassen, The Scoring Berlin Orchestra: Fjara
- 2020: Eldbjørg Hemsing, Michael England, NDR Radiophilharmonie: Vladimir Martynov, Come In!: IV. Movement
- 2021: Eldbjørg Hemsing, Hestia String Quartet: Antonio Vivaldi, Winter Meditation (after The Four Seasons, Violin Concerto, RV 297: II. Largo)
- 2022: Eldbjørg Hemsing, Arctic Philharmonic: Henning Sommerro, Varsøg (Arr. for Violin and Orchestra by Ben Palmer)
- 2022: Eldbjørg Hemsing, Arctic Philharmonic: Edvard Grieg, Last Spring (Arr. for Violin and Orchestra from Op. 33 No. 2 by Ben Palmer)
- 2022: Eldbjørg Hemsing, Arctic Philharmonic: Frode Fjellheim, Under the Arctic Moon
- 2022: Eldbjørg Hemsing, Arctic Philharmonic: James Newton Howard, A Hidden Life
- 2022: Eldbjørg Hemsing, Arctic Philharmonic: Ola Gjeilo, Dawn
- 2022: Eldbjørg Hemsing, Arctic Philharmonic: Jacob Shea, The Arctic Suite: VI. Sea Ice Melting
- 2023: Eldbjørg Hemsing, Raphaela Gromes, Håvard Gimse: Jules Massenet, Thaïs - Meditation (Trio Version)
- 2023: Eldbjørg Hemsing, Håvard Gimse: Johan Halvorsen, Suite Mosaique, Op. 35: IV. Veslemøys sang
- 2023: Eldbjørg Hemsing, Raphaela Gromes, Håvard Gimse: Gabriel Fauré, Pavane, Op. 50 (Trio Version)
- 2024: Eldbjørg Hemsing, Håvard Gimse: Ole Bull, Sæterjentens Søndag
- 2024: Eldbjørg Hemsing, Arctic Philharmonic: Jacob Shea, The Arctic Suite, V. Sea Ice Melting (Violin-Piano Version)
- 2024: Eldbjørg Hemsing, Håvard Gimse: Ludvig Irgens-Jensen, Bol's Song
- 2024: Eldbjørg Hemsing, Norwegian String Quintet, Tim Allhoff: Johann Sebastian Bach, Ich steh an deiner Krippen hier, BWV 469 (Arr. for Violin, String Quintet & Piano by Jan-Peter Klöpfel)
- 2025: Eldbjørg Hemsing, Norwegian String Quintet, Tim Allhoff: Johann Sebastian Bach, Bach Partita Variation (From BWV 1006: 1, Arr. for Violin, String Quintet & Piano by Tim Allhoff)
- 2025: Eldbjørg Hemsing, Norwegian String Quintet, Tim Allhoff: Johann Sebastian Bach, Bach Brandenburg Concerto Revisited (From BWV 1046: 1. Allegro, Arr. for Violin, String Quintet & Piano by Jarkko Riihimäki)
- 2025: Eldbjørg Hemsing, Norwegian String Quintet, Tim Allhoff: Johann Sebastian Bach, Ave Maria Variation (From Bach's The Well-Tempered Clavier, Book 1: Prelude and Fugue No. 1 in C Major, BWV 846: I. Prelude, Arr. for violin, String Quintet and Piano by Tim Allhoff)

== Competitions and awards ==
Hemsing received third prize in Eurovision Young Musicians 2008. Hemsing is also a two time Spellemannprisen award winner. She first won in 2020 for her recordings of the Grieg Sonatas, which she released with pianist Simon Trpčeski. She won again in 2024 for her album Hillborg: Violin Concerto No. 2/Liquid Marble. Her 2023 album Arctic received the Opus Klassik Award in the category Classic without Limits.
