= Deadline =

Deadline(s) or The Deadline(s) most commonly refers to:

- Time limit, a narrow field of time by which an objective must be accomplished

Deadline(s) or The Deadline(s) may also refer to:

== Arts, entertainment, and media ==
=== Comics ===
- Deadline (character), a fictional villain
- Deadline (comics magazine), a British comics magazine
- Deadline (Marvel Comics), a 2002 limited series

=== Films ===
- The Dead Line (1920 film), an American silent drama
- The Dead Line (1926 film), an American silent western
- The Deadline (film), a 1931 American western directed by Lambert Hillyer
- Deadline (1948 film), an American western starring Sunset Carson
- Deadline (1971 film), a Swedish/Danish film directed by Stellan Olsson
- Deadline (1980 film), a Canadian horror film starring Stephen Young
- Deadline (1982 film), an Australian film starring Barry Newman
- Deadline (1987 film), a war drama starring Christopher Walken
- Deadline (1988 film), a British television drama starring John Hurt and Imogen Stubbs
- Deadline (1998 film), a Danish film starring Charlotte Fich
- Deadline (2001 film), a Swedish thriller
- Deadline (2004 film), a film shot in Pittsburgh
- Deadline (2005 film), an Indian Bengali-language film directed by Atanu Ghosh
- Deadline (2009 film), an American horror film starring Brittany Murphy
- Deadline (2012 film), an American mystery drama starring Eric Roberts
- Deadline: Sirf 24 Ghante, a 2006 Bollywood film
- Deadline – U.S.A., also known as Deadline, a 1952 American newspaper drama starring Humphrey Bogart
- Deadlines (film), 2004, starring Anne Parillaud

=== Games ===
- Deadline (1982 video game), a text adventure
- Deadline (1996 video game), a computer game by Millennium Interactive
- Deadline Games, a defunct Danish video-game developer

=== Literature ===
- Deadline (Crutcher novel), 2007, by Chris Crutcher
- Deadline (Grant novel), 2011, by Mira Grant
- "Deadline" (science fiction story), a 1944 story by Cleve Cartmill
- Deadline, a 2000 novel by Campbell Armstrong
- Deadline, a 1988 novel by Tom Stacey
- The Deadline: A Novel About Project Management, a 1997 book by Tom DeMarco

=== Music ===
==== Performers and labels ====
- Deadline (band), a 1985–1991 electronic music collective
- The Deadlines, an 1998–2002 American rock band
- Deadline, an early-1980s American punk band that featured future Fugazi member Brendan Canty
- Deadline, a sub-label of the American record label Cleopatra Records

==== Albums ====
- Deadline (Leftöver Crack and Citizen Fish album), 2007
- Deadline (S7N album) or the title song, 2016
- Deadlines (Strawbs album), 1977
- Dead Line, by Dead End, 1986
- Deadlines, by Arkells, 2007

==== EPs ====
- Deadline (EP), by Blackpink, 2026
- The Deadline (EP), by Supastition, 2004

==== Songs ====
- "Deadline", by Blue Öyster Cult from Cultösaurus Erectus, 1980
- "Deadline", by Dutch Force, co-produced by Benno de Goeij, 1999
- "Deadline", by Krokus from Pain Killer, 1978
- "Deadline", by Robert Palmer from Pride, 1983
- "Deadlines", by Car Seat Headrest from Making a Door Less Open, 2020

=== Radio ===
- Deadline (audio drama), 2003, based on the TV series Doctor Who
- Deadline (radio drama), an Australian radio drama anthology series from the 1950s
- The Dead Line (radio drama), a 2009 Torchwood radio drama

=== Television ===
==== Programs ====
- Deadline (1959 TV series), an American series
- Deadline (1995 TV series), a British fly-on-the-wall documentary series about local newsgathering
- Deadline (2000 TV series), a 2000–2001 American drama series about a newspaper
- Deadline (2007 TV series), a British celebrity reality series
- Deadline (2022 TV series), a British crime mystery mini-series

==== Episodes ====
- "Dead Line" (Inside No. 9), a 2018 episode of British anthology series Inside No. 9
- "Deadline", an episode of the Indian TV series Dhoom Machaao Dhoom
- "Deadline" (The Agency)
- "Deadline" (Bat Masterson)
- "Deadline" (Beverly Hills, 90210)
- "Deadline" (The Bill)
- "Deadline" (CSI: Miami)
- "Deadline" (Danger Man)
- "Deadline" (Deadliest Catch)
- "Deadline" (Early Edition)
- "Deadline" (Freddy's Nightmares)
- "Deadline" (NCIS: Los Angeles)
- "Deadline" (Relic Hunter)
- "Deadline" (The Streets of San Francisco)
- "Deadline" (Tales from the Crypt)
- "Deadline" (TekWar)
- "Deadline" (Walker, Texas Ranger)
- "Deadline" (White Collar)
- "The Deadline", a nickname of "Episode 6" (Life on Mars, series 1)

=== Other uses in arts, entertainment, and media ===
- Deadline Hollywood, an online entertainment news magazine, and its website Deadline.com
- Deadline Music, an imprint of Cleopatra Records
- NXT Deadline, a professional wrestling event held since 2022
- Deadline World Tour, a concert tour by Blackpink since 2025

== Other uses ==
- Dead line, Canadian football for the line marking the end of the end zone

== See also ==
- Due date (disambiguation)
