= Anne-Marie Ørbeck =

Norwegian pianist and composer (1911–1996)

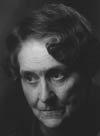
Anne-Marie Ørbeck

Anne-Marie Ørbeck (1 April 1911 – 5 June 1996) was a Norwegian pianist and composer.

== Biography ==
Anne-Marie Ørbeck was born in Oslo on 1 April 1911, to Anton Ørbeck (1866–1927) and Inga Louise Larsen (1874–1948). Her brother Gunnar Ørbeck was a violinist. She studied piano in Oslo and in Berlin with Sandra Drouker. She continued her studies in music and composition under teachers including Gustav Fredrik Lange, Mark Lothar, Paul Höffer and Darius Milhaud. She made her debut as a pianist in Oslo in 1933 with the Oslo Philharmonic Orchestra.

In 1939 Ørbeck married engineer Helge Smitt (1906–1985). Her career as a musician and composer was interrupted by World War II, but her song cycle "Vonir i blømetid" (Hope at Blossom-Time) won a prize in 1942 from the Norwegian Society of Composers. In the 1950s, she studied composition again with Nadia Boulanger in Paris, and later with Hanns Jelinek in Vienna. Her Symphony in D Major was premiered in Bergen in 1954, making her the first female Norwegian symphonic composer. She died in Bergen in 1996.

== Works ==
Ørbeck composed works for orchestra, chamber ensemble and solo instrument, but specialized in vocal works, including songs, choral works and psalm compositions. Selected works include:

Orchestral works:

- Concertino for Piano and Orchestra, 1938
- Melody, Miniature Suite, 1940
- Symphony in D major, 1944
- Rune March, 1946
- Pastorale and Allegro for Flute and Strings, 1959

Piano and chamber works:

- Concert Event of R. Strauss' Der Rosenkavalier from Rollers for piano, 1935
- Cadenzas for piano concertos by Haydn and Mozart, 1967
- Sonatina, 1967
- Valse piccante, 1971
- Marcia indomabile, 1973
- Violin and Piano: Norwegian springar, 1928
- Melody, 1931

Songs:

- Vonir in blømetid, 7 songs to poems by HH Holmes, 1942
- So they rowed fjordan(text: A. Vaa), 1954
- Wild-Guri (text: T. Jonsson), 1955
- The rock, 1955
- A hustavle (text: A. Overland), 1957
- Snow (text: A. Overland), 1959
- Star Song (text: I. Krokann), 1964
- Choir: A pine (text: HH Holmes), 1946
- Ovspel (text: HH Holmes), 1952
- Our country (text: A. Overland), 1954
- Summer Night (text: A. Overland), 1956
- Psalm about the art (text: L. Kvalstad), 1964

=== Discography ===
Ørbeck's compositions have been recorded and issued on CD, including:

- The Norwegian Flute, BIS
- Kittelsen, G.: Festduett/Hegdal, M.: Aleatoric Construction for Piano/VEA, K.: Trio for Flute, Alto Saxophone and Piano (BIT 20 Ensemble), Aurora
- Orbeck, A: Symphony/Songs (Hirsti, Royal Philharmonic, Dreier), Aurora

== Sources ==
- Michelsen, Kari (2001). "Ørbeck, Anne-Marie". Grove Music Online.
