= Sandra Droucker =

Russian musician (1876–1944)

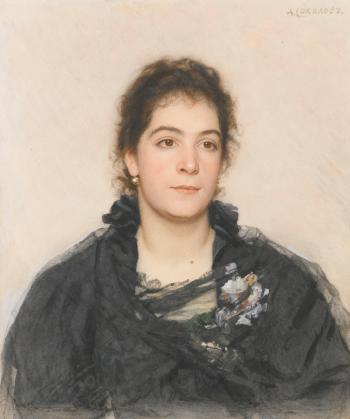
Sandra Droucker

Sandra Droucker (Drouker or Droucher) (7 May 1875 – 1 April 1944) was a Russian concert pianist, composer and music pedagogue.

== Life and career ==
Sandra Droucker was born in St. Petersburg, Russia, the daughter of a Jewish German father and a mother who was a member of the Russian nobility. She studied music at the St. Petersburg Conservatory with Anton Rubinstein, and made her debut in 1894. She toured Europe and Russia, quickly developing her own style as a pianist.

In 1896 Droucker made her debut in Berlin to positive reviews. During the 1880s she lived in Berlin, continuing her career as a concert pianist. Between 1904 and 1906 she taught in Berlin at Petersen's Academy of Music and at the Stern Conservatory. Notable students included the Norwegian composer and pianist Anne-Marie Ørbeck (1911–1996), Hilde Lange, Leni Dilthey, Marie Silbermann, Delli Georges and Gerda Paucksch. In 1905 Droucker taught music to Princess Victoria Louise of Prussia.

Droucker married the Austrian pianist Gottfried Galston in 1910 and changed her name to Droucker-Galston. The couple took up residence in Munich, and the marriage lasted until 1918. In 1926 Droucker returned to Berlin; however, after 1933, she left Germany because of her Jewish heritage and settled in Oslo, becoming a Norwegian citizen in 1938.

During these years, Droucker added music lectures to her concerts, speaking about music history and similar topics. She died in 1944 at the Red Cross Hospital Hamar, near Oslo.

== Works ==
Droucker's body of composition is very small, as she was mainly a pianist and pedagogue. A number of her concert performances are available as sound recordings.

- Mazurka
- Two Pieces for Children
- François Couperin: 12 Piano Pieces, edited by Sandra Droucker

Text:

- Memories of Anton Rubinstein: Comments, suggestions and discussions (with many music examples) in its class at the St. Petersburg Conservatory. Leipzig: Bartholf Senff, 1904.
