= Stefan Klaverdal =

Swedish composer (born 1975)

Stefan Klaverdal (born 7 March 1975) is a Swedish composer and sound artist working mainly with performative electronic, chamber and vocal music. He was born in Stockholm, and teaches at both Malmö Academy of Music and Malmö Art Academy. In 2004, he was accepted as a member into the Association of Swedish composers (FST). Internationally praised in several competitions, both 2006 and 2008 he was awarded first prize in the International Competition for Electroacoustic Music in Bourges for the electronic music to the dance films Human Pattern and Insyn. 2010 the CD Revelations was released with music performed by London-based Tippett Quartet among others. In 2011 he received The Prince Eugen Culture Prize.

== Selected Pieces ==
- Levande Vatten (Living Water) – for children's choir, mixed choir, percussion, organ and computer
- The Sacred Family – for string quartet and computer (2005–2008)
- The Longing of Eurydice – violin, piano och elektronik (2005)
- Mänskligt Mönster / Human Pattern – electroacoustic music to the film Human Pattern by Klara Elenius (2005)
- On Being – for saxophone quartet and computer (2004/2005)
- Vägen framför andra – for mixed choir (2004)
- Judas – oratory for narrator, tenor, baryton, mixed choir, organ and computer (2003/2004)
- Samtal / Conversations – electroacoustic music (2003)
- Och näktergalen i mina drömmar (2026)

== Selected discography ==
- Revelations (various, 2010)
- Electric Tuba (Kjetil Myklebust, 2009)
- April och Tystnad (Lunds Vokalensemble, 2005)
