= The Prince Eugen Culture Prize =

The Prince Eugen Culture Prize is named after the Swedish Prince Eugén (1865–1947), who had a close connection to Norway and dedicated his life to strengthen the Swedish-Norwegian relations.

Through his position as royalty, the artistic prince was well-connected to the Norwegian public and cultural life, which he carefully followed while giving support to young artists. He was also involved in the Norwegian and Swedish musical scene and was a member of the committee of the construction of Stockholm Concert Hall. He was well known in the Scandinavian literature circles, and was an active reader of fiction, history and politics.

The Prince Eugen Culture Prize was founded to celebrate the 100 year mark of the dissolution of the Swedish-Norwegian union in 1905 after an initiative from the Royal Norwegian Embassy in Stockholm, in cooperation with Crown Princess Märtha's Church Council in Stockholm and Princess Märtha Louise's Culture Fund. The Prince Eugen Culture Prize is awarded to one Norwegian and one Swedish artist who through their work have contributed to strengthen Swedish-Norwegian relations. The award consists of a diploma and 50 000 Swedish crowns.

Through the years, the award has been presented by Queen Sonja of Norway, Crown Princess Victoria and Princess Madeleine of Sweden.

== Award winners ==
Year	Award winners
2005	Merete Løkkeberg Meyer and Jenny Tunedal
2006	Tine Thing Helseth and Andreas Brantelid
2007	Vilde Frang Bjærke and Sofia Jannok
2008	Maria Verbaite and Johannes Weisser
2009	Ane Brun and Sofia Karlsson
2010	Gunnhild Øyehaug and Erik Lindeborg
2011	Randi Tytingvåg and Stefan Klaverdal
