= Tine Thing Helseth =

Norwegian trumpeter (born 1987)

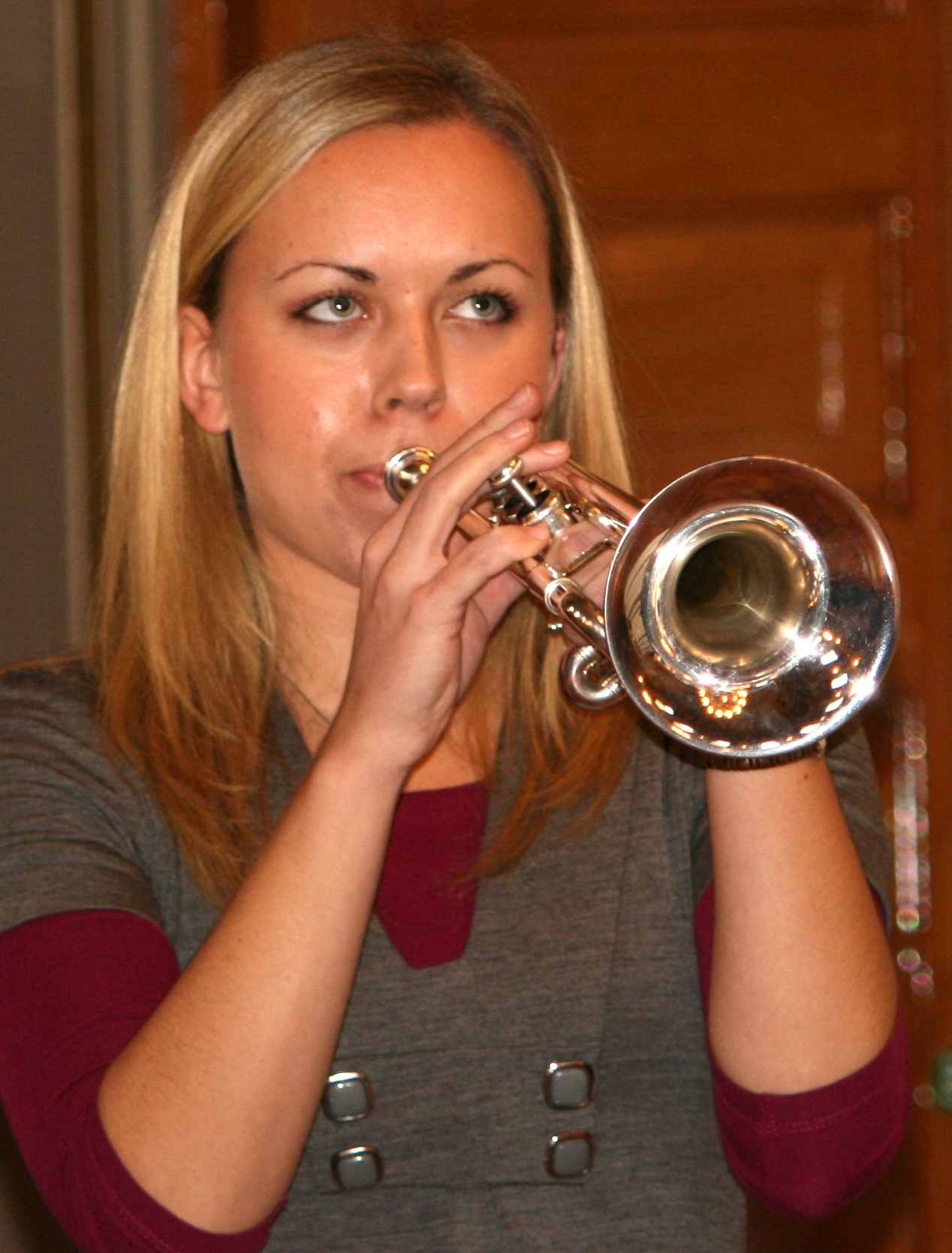
- Thing Helseth in 2008

Background information
- Born: 18 August 1987 (age 39); Oslo, Norway
- Genres: Classical
- Occupation: Soloist trumpeter
- Instrument: Trumpets by Vincent Bach Corporation
- Labels: EMI Classics, Warner Classics, Lawo Classics
- Website: www.tinethinghelseth.com

Tine Thing Helseth (/ˈtiːnə tɪŋ ˈhɛlsət/ TEE-nə ting HEL-sət; born 18 August 1987) is a Norwegian trumpet soloist specializing in classical repertoire. She has appeared as a soloist with orchestras and chamber ensembles in Europe, North America, Asia and Australia, and is also active as a recording artist, ensemble leader and festival artistic director.

== Career ==
Helseth was born in Oslo. She started to play the trumpet at the age of seven in a school band and studied at the Barratt Due Institute of Music from 2002 to 2009 and at the Norwegian Academy of Music from 2009 to 2011. Her teachers have included Heidi Johanessen (Norwegian National Opera Orchestra) and, since 2002, Arnulf Naur Nilsen (Oslo Philharmonic).

Helseth is the leader of the all-female brass ensemble tenThing, which she founded in 2007 with other Norwegian brass players. The ensemble has toured in Europe, the United States and China and has appeared at festivals including the BBC Proms, the Schleswig-Holstein Musik Festival, Beethovenfest Bonn, MDR Musiksommer, Rheingau Musik Festival and Thüringer Bachwochen.

In 2011, Helseth was named a "Superstar of Tomorrow" by BBC Music Magazine. The same year she signed a contract with EMI Classics. From 2013 her recordings appeared under the Warner Classics label following the acquisition of EMI Classics by Warner Music Group.

From 2023, Helseth has served as artistic director of the Risør Chamber Music Festival, with which she had been associated for more than a decade. She is also active in Norway as a television and radio presenter and teaches trumpet at the Norwegian Academy of Music.

== Concert and festival performances ==
Helseth has performed with orchestras including the Vienna Symphony, Beethoven Academie, Capella Cracoviensis, the Norwegian Chamber Orchestra, Royal Liverpool Philharmonic, Shanghai Symphony Orchestra, RTV Slovenia Symphony Orchestra, Oslo Camerata, Camerata Nordica, Württembergische Philharmonie, the Trondheim Soloists, Norwegian symphony orchestras, Norwegian Army bands and other brass and wind ensembles.

Later biographical sources list further orchestral collaborations with the Bamberg Symphony, NDR Elbphilharmonie Orchestra, Gürzenich Orchestra Cologne, Tonkünstler Orchestra, Philharmonia Orchestra, BBC Scottish Symphony Orchestra, Warsaw Philharmonic, Rotterdam Philharmonic Orchestra, Oslo Philharmonic, Bergen Philharmonic Orchestra, Helsinki Philharmonic Orchestra, Danish National Symphony Orchestra, Royal Stockholm Philharmonic Orchestra, Minnesota Orchestra, Baltimore Symphony Orchestra, Cincinnati Symphony Orchestra, Singapore Symphony Orchestra, KBS Symphony Orchestra, Hong Kong Philharmonic Orchestra, Melbourne Symphony Orchestra, Auckland Philharmonia, Taiwan Philharmonic, Staatsorchester Hannover, Staatsorchester Stuttgart and Orquesta Sinfónica de Navarra.

Conductors with whom Helseth has worked in concerts or recordings include Eivind Aadland, Ole Kristian Ruud, Miguel Harth-Bedoya, Vasily Petrenko, Matthias Pintscher, Thomas Søndergård, Nayden Todorov, Per Kristian Skalstad, Fabio Luisi, Petr Popelka, Alpesh Chauhan and Aziz Shokhakimov.

She has appeared at music festivals including Bergen International Festival, Kissinger Summer Festival and Usedomer Music Festival. Later festival appearances with tenThing and as a soloist have included the BBC Proms, Schleswig-Holstein Musik Festival, Beethovenfest Bonn, Rheingau Musik Festival, Gstaad, MDR Musiksommer, Mecklenburg-Vorpommern, Merano and Bremen.

In 2007 Helseth performed at the Nobel Peace Prize Concert.

Helseth has also performed more than five times in the United States. In 2009, she performed at the National Gallery of Art in Washington, D.C.; in 2011, at Carnegie Hall in New York City and the Struthers Library Theatre in Warren, Pennsylvania; in 2014, at Bass Performance Hall in Fort Worth, Texas. In 2019, she toured the United States with her all-female brass group, tenThing.

In 2012, she opened the memorial concert for the 2011 Norway attacks by playing trumpet from the roof of Oslo City Hall.

In 2013 she appeared twice in the BBC Proms, performing with tenThing at the Cadogan Hall and also at the Royal Albert Hall. The same year, she appeared as soloist in the London premiere of Matthias Pintscher's Chute d'Étoiles with Marco Blaauw and the BBC Scottish Symphony Orchestra under Pintscher.

She performed at the Australian Festival of Chamber Music in 2018, and in 2024 gave a master class at the Australian National Academy of Music as well as playing Weinberg's Trumpet Concerto with the Melbourne Symphony Orchestra. In the 2023–24 season she was listed for performances with the Melbourne Symphony Orchestra, Auckland Philharmonia, Taiwan Philharmonic, Staatsorchester Hannover, Staatsorchester Stuttgart and Orquesta Sinfónica de Navarra, and for the premiere of a concerto for violin and trumpet by Xi Wang with violinist Karen Gomyo and the Dallas Symphony Orchestra under Fabio Luisi.

== Releases ==
Helseth appeared on Didrik Solli-Tangen's second single "Best Kept Secret", taken from Solli-Tangen's debut album Guilty Pleasures, which was released on 3 September 2010. In 2012, she released her debut album Storyteller on EMI Classics, as well as 10, the debut album of her brass ensemble, tenThing. Her album TINE, a personal selection of original and transcribed works, was released on 12 March 2013.

In 2017, she appeared with the Norwegian Radio Orchestra under Miguel Harth-Bedoya on Variations over Variations, an album of contemporary Norwegian orchestral works. In 2020, she appeared on Dacapo Records' recording of Bent Sørensen concertos, performing Sørensen's Trumpet Concerto with the Norwegian Chamber Orchestra conducted by Per Kristian Skalstad. The album won the DR P2 Prize in 2021.

In 2021, Helseth released Magical Memories, recorded with organist Kåre Nordstoga in Oslo Cathedral during the COVID-19 pandemic. In 2022, she released Seraph with Ensemble Allegria on Lawo Classics. In 2024, tenThing released She Composes Like a Man, an album devoted to music by female composers. In 2025, Helseth released Echoes with the Bergen Philharmonic Orchestra under Petr Popelka, featuring trumpet works by Alexander Arutiunian, Krzysztof Penderecki and Mieczysław Weinberg. The album was nominated for the Spellemannprisen for best classical recording.

== Prizes, contests and awards ==
- National Soloist Championship of Norway no-age-limit open class 1st Prize 2004
- International Trumpet Competition "Théo Charlier" Brussels, Belgium 2nd prize 2005
- Oslo Music Teachers Foundation Prize of Honour 2005
- Yamaha Music Foundation Europe Scholarship 2006
- Eurovision Young Musicians 2006 2nd place
- The Prince Eugen Culture Prize 2006
- NRK Radio P2 Prize for 2006/2007
- Luitpold Prize of the festival Kissinger Sommer, 2007
- Spellemannprisen for best newcomer, 2007
- Borletti-Buitoni Trust Fellowship, 2009
- ECHO Klassik Newcomer of the Year, 2013
- Spellemannprisen nomination for best classical recording for Echoes, 2026

== Discography ==
- 2007: Trumpet Concertos, Haydn, Albinoni, Neruda, Hummel – with Det Norske Kammerorkester
- 2009: Mitt Hjerte Alltid Vanker (My Heart Is Ever Present)
- 2011: Storyteller
- 2012: 10 – with tenThing
- 2013: Tine
- 2017: Never Going Back
- 2017: Variations over Variations
- 2020: Bent Sørensen: Concertos
- 2021: Magical Memories
- 2022: Seraph
- 2024: She Composes Like a Man – with tenThing
- 2025: Echoes

Awards
Preceded by 120 Days	Recipient of the Newcomer Spellemannprisen; 2007	Succeeded by Ida Maria
