= Stephan Henrik Barratt-Due =

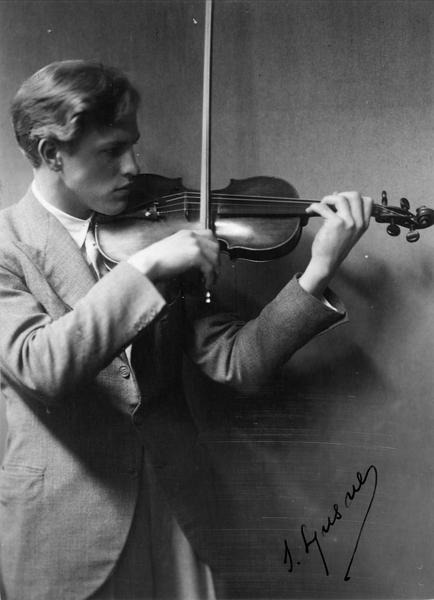

Background information
- Birth name: Stephan Henrik Barratt Due
- Born: 19 February 1919; Oslo
- Origin: Norway
- Died: 18 November 1985 (aged 66); Oslo
- Genres: Classical
- Occupation(s): Musician, music teacher
- Instrument: Violin

Stephan Henrik Barratt-Due (19 February 1919 – 18 November 1985) was a Norwegian violinist and music teacher and son of violinist Henrik Adam Due (1891–1966) and Mary Barratt Due (b. Barratt, 1888–1969). He married Else Barratt-Due (b. Holst, 1925–2006), and together they had five children, among them pianist Cecilie Barratt-Due (1950–) and violinist Stephan Barratt-Due Jr. (1956–), who is married to violinist Soon-Mi Chung.

== Biography ==
Barrat-Due studied violin with his father from an early age, and debuted in 1940. He held numerous concerts in Scandinavia, the UK and USA, and was artistic director of the Barratt Due Institute of Music from 1970 to 1985.
