= Oslo Camerata =

String orchestra

The Oslo Camerata is a mostly classical string orchestra based in Oslo, Norway, as part of the Barratt Due Institute of Music. Established in 1998, the orchestra consists mostly of professional musicians, with selected Institute students participating in projects. The repertoire consists of classic and newly composed pieces, and has been described as one of the most innovative orchestras in Europe. It has performed extensively in Norway, with support of that country’s Ministry of Culture and parts of Europe along with India, Brazil and Mexico. It has released three CDs since 2006.

== Composition and repertoire ==
The Oslo Camerata was established in 1998 as the “ensemble in residence” of the Barratt Due Institute of Music in Oslo. It mostly consists of professional musicians; however, chosen students from the Institute’s bachelors and masters programs also participate in projects. The orchestra has some of the youngest performers in the European classical music scene and is considered to be one of the most innovative orchestras. The core of the Camerata consists of founder/director Stephan Barratt-Due, third generation violinist of the family, violist Soon-Mi Chung and cellist Bjørn Solum. The orchestra is based at the Institute, located at Lyder Sagens gate 2 in Oslo, Norway.

Their repertoire spans from baroque to contemporary music, commissioning works from both young and established composers. The orchestra has worked with artists such as Truls Mørk, Julian Rachlin, Mischa Maisky, Henning Kraggerud, Arve Tellefsen, Ole Edvard Antonsen, Juhani Lagerspetz, Christian Lindberg, Randi Stene and Per Arne Glorvigen . The Camerata and Truls Mørk have collaborated closely, with the cellist often performing as principal guest leader.

== Appearances ==
The Camerata has toured on four continents, primarily in Europe. On this continent, it has appeared at the XXVI Ciclo de Introducción a la Música in Spain and the Festival de Música de Canarias . It has also participated in other events in Spain, as well as Switzerland and Germany . It has toured and performed extensively in its native Norway including the international festivals in Bergen and North of Norway as well as the chamber music festivals in Oslo, Kristiansand and Stavanger, supported by Norway’s Ministry of Culture. The orchestra has its own concert series at the Old Masonic Lodge in Oslo. The purpose of this series is to combine the talents of established artists, young musicians and international soloists, presenting new and unknown music as well as classical repertoire. In India, the orchestra played in New Delhi, Bungalore, Bombay and Huderabat. In Brazil, it played at the Mozarteum in São Paulo . Most recently, it was invited to participate in the 2011 Festival Internacional Cervantino in Guanajuato, Mexico as part of the representation of Norway, one of that year’s special guest countries.

== Releases ==
The orchestra has released two CDs so far called the Holberg Suite, focusing on this suite for strings by Edvard Grieg on the Naxos International label. This CD received favorable reviews from Classics Today and the Oslo Puls . A second recording came out in 2010, with two violin concertos by Louis Spohr with soloists Henning Kraggerud and Øyvind Bjorå. A third album, recording Grieg String Quartets arranged for orchestra and “Rendezvous” by Norwegian composer Arne Nordheim, was released in 2011.

== Other projects ==
Since 2008, the orchestra has been involved in a project for children and youth in Niterói, Brazil. It is called Projeto Aprendiz, teaching music students and teachers, work with local ensembles, donating instruments and equipment and helping to build a music library. This work is co sponsored by the Norwegian Ministry of Foreign Affairs.
