= Ragnhild Hemsing =

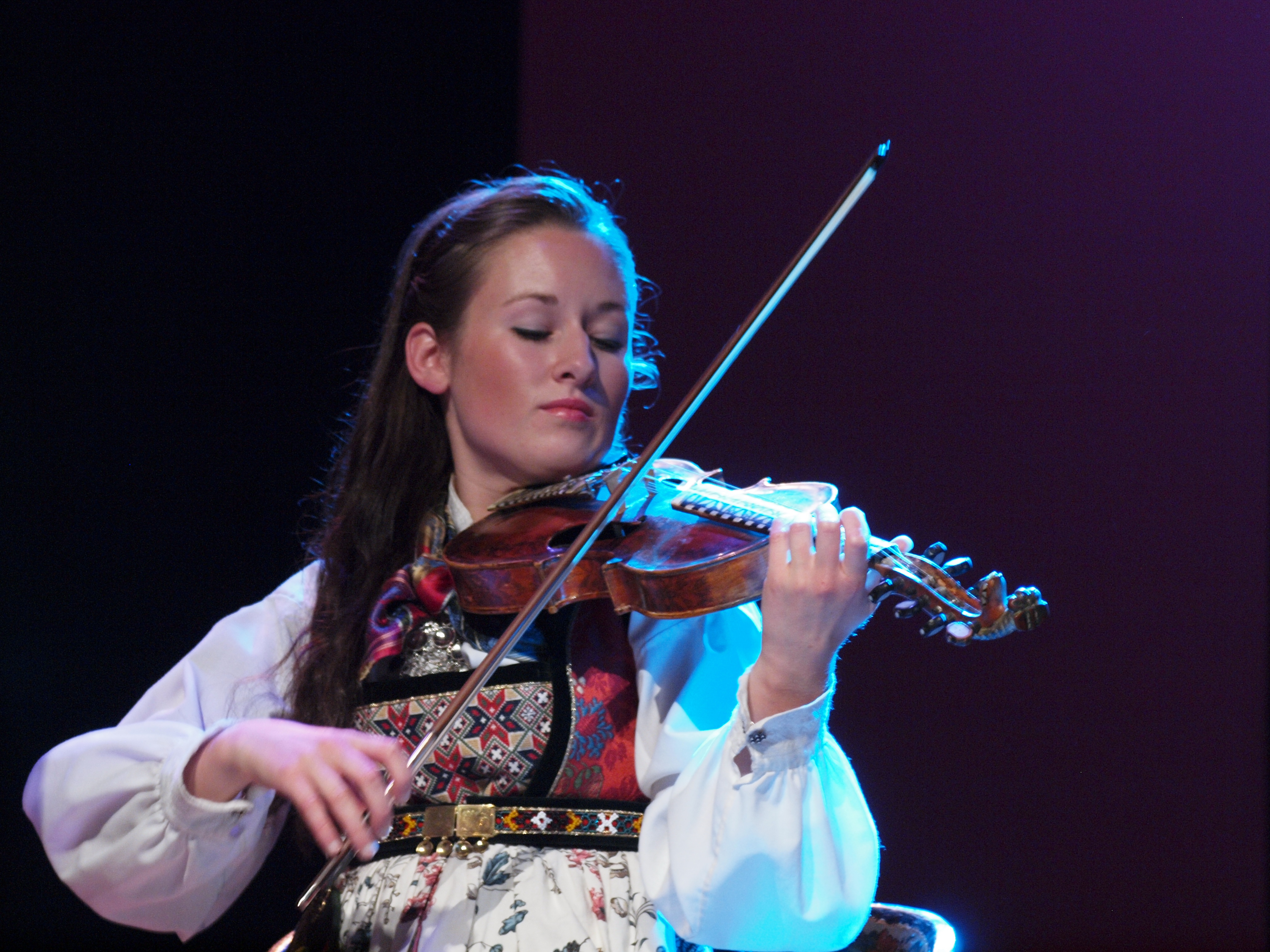
- Hemsing in Seljord 2011

Background information
- Born: 15 February 1988 (age 38); Valdres, Oppland
- Origin: Norway
- Genres: Classical music
- Occupation: Musician
- Instruments: Hardingfele, violin, vocals
- Years active: 1994–present
- Labels: Simax, Chandos
- Website: www.ragnhildhemsing.com

Ragnhild Hemsing (born 15 February 1988 in Valdres, Norway) is a Norwegian classical violinist and the older sister of classical violinist, Eldbjørg Hemsing.

== Biography ==
Ragnhild Hemsing was born on 15 February 1988, in Valdres, Norway. She began to play the violin when she was five years old. She enrolled at the Barratt Due Institute of Music in Oslo at the age of nine. Later, she studied in Vienna with Boris Kuschnir.

Hemsing debuted at age 14 with both the Bergen Philharmonic Orchestra and the Trondheim Symphony Orchestra playing Mendelssohn's Violin Concerto. The following year she performed with the Oslo Philharmonic Orchestra. She has performed with the Danish National Radio Symphony Orchestra, the Ukrainian National Philharmonic Orchestra, and the Kazan State Orchestra in Russia, among others. She has performed with Norway’s leading orchestras, including the aforementioned Oslo Philharmonic Orchestra, the Bergen Philharmonic Orchestra, and the Stavanger Symphony Orchestra.

Hemsing won the Sparre Olsen competition in 2005.

Hemsing plays on a Francesco Ruggeri violin built in Cremona in 1694, on loan from the Dextra Musica Foundation.

== Appearances ==
Hemsing has appeared at concert halls across Norway, including the Bergen International Festival, the Oslo Chamber Music Festival, Hardingtonar Festival, and Førde International World Music Festival, where she has been combining folk programmes with classical repertoire. As a recitalist, she has also performed at the Northern Lights in Tromsø and the Stavanger, Trondheim, and Harstad International Chamber Music Festivals, and at the Wigmore Hall, the Verbier Festival, Bellerive Festival in Switzerland and AlpenKlassik in Germany, amongst others. In 2011, she performed at the Cheltenham festival together with Leif Ove Andsnes and Tine Thing Helseth.

Hemsing has performed at the Nobel Peace Prize Concert. Along with her sister, Eldbjørg Hemsing, she recorded a 60-minute documentary on the life of the famous Norwegian violinist Ole Bull, which received a special EBU award. In 2013 she was awarded the Beethoven Ring at the annual Beethoven Festival in Bonn.

== Honors ==
- 2003: First Prize and European Union Prize at the Kocian International Violin Competition in the Czech Republic
- 2003: First Prize and Special Prize at the European Music Prize for Youth
- 2005: Sparre Olsen-prisen
- 2013: Beethoven Ring to the best concert performed during the annual Beethoven Festival in Bonn

== Discography ==
- 2011: YR (Simax)
- 2011: Johan Halvorsen: Orchestral Works Volume 3 (Chandos), with Marianne Thorsen and the Bergen Philharmonic Orchestra conducted by Neeme Järvi
- 2011: Varde (Kvarts and Hemsing), with Kvarts and Eldbjørg Hemsing
- 2017: Northern Timbre (2L), with Tor Espen Aspaas
- 2020: Beethoven's Testaments Of 1802 (2L) with Tor Espen Aspaas
- 2021: Røta (Berlin Classics)
- 2022: Peer Gynt (Berlin Classics) with Trondheim Soloists
- 2023: BRUCH+TVEITT (Berlin Classics) - compositions by Max Bruch, Geirr Tveitt, and others.
- 2023: Vetra: my Norwegian winter (Berlin Classics)
