= Gustav Fredrik Lange =

Norwegian violinist, teacher and composer (1861–1939)

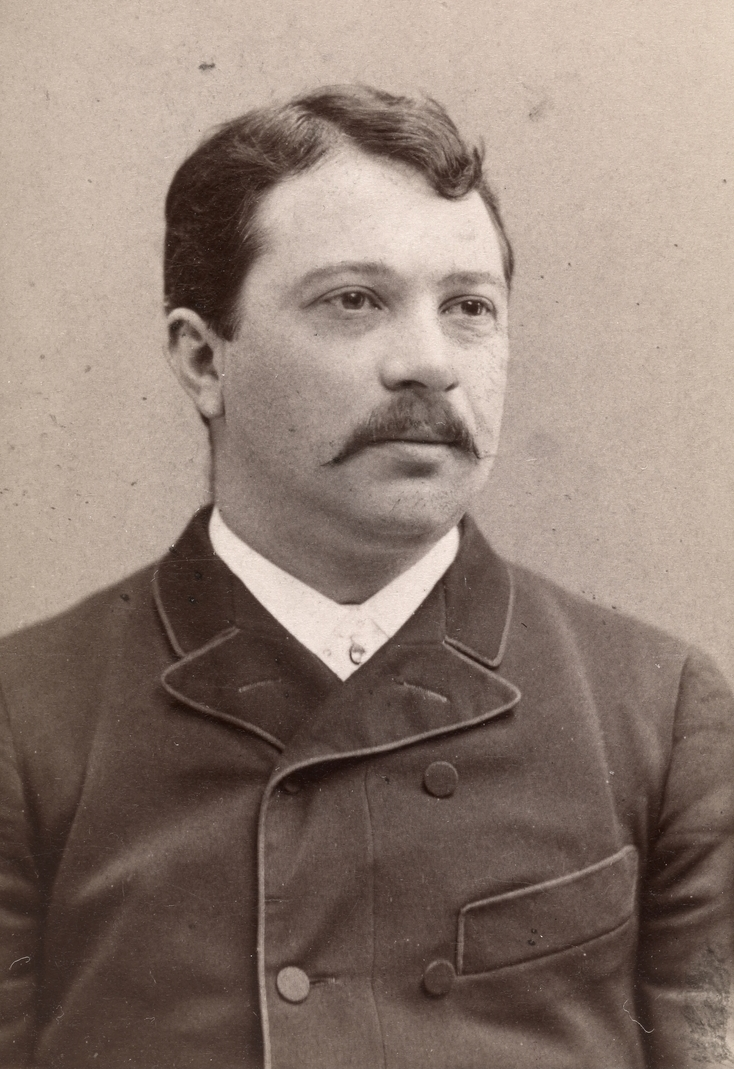

Background information
- Born: February 22, 1861; Halden, Norway
- Died: February 11, 1939 (aged 77) Oslo, Norway
- Genres: Classical
- Occupations: Musician, educator, composer
- Instrument: Violin
- Formerly of: Oslo Philharmonic; Freemasons Orchestra
- Awards: King's Medal of Merit (gold, 1921); Litteris et Artibus; Ordre des Palmes Académiques

Gustav Fredrik Lange (February 22, 1861 – February 11, 1939) was a Norwegian violinist, violin teacher, theory teacher, and composer. During his time, he was considered one of Norway's best in his field.

== Biography ==
Lange was born in Halden. He was the second concertmaster of the Oslo Philharmonic from its beginning in 1919, and for a time he served as first concertmaster at the Christiania Theatre and National Theatre. With Ole Olsen and Edvard Grieg, he created music for Henrik Ibsen's comedy The League of Youth (premiere at the Swedish Theatre, 1901). Like Ole Olsen, Lange was a Freemason and worked as a conductor and arranger for the Freemasons Orchestra (1921–1936). In Halden he was a member of a chamber quartet together with Oscar Borg (his violin teacher in his youth), Markus Boberg, and the cellist Dupery Hamilton.

Together with Peter Brynie Lindeman, Lange edited the periodical Orkestertidende—blad for musikere og musikervenner (The Orchestra Times: A Paper for Musicians and Their Friends; 1892–1894). Lange was a cofounder of the Oslo Music Teachers Association, the Norwegian Music Teachers' National Federation, and the National Federation of Norwegian Musical Artists (Norwegian: Norsk Tonekunstnersamfund). He also taught violin, theory, and harmony at the Oslo Conservatory of Music (1889–1937).

Lange died in Oslo.

== Selected students ==
Prominent students that Gustav Fredrik Lange taught during his career include:

- Anne-Marie Ørbeck (1911–1996), pianist and composer
- Henrik Adam Due (1891–1966), violinist
- Magne Elvestrand (1914–1991), organist
- Johan Stanley Simonsen (1904–2003), violinist
- Gunnar Knudsen (1907–2003), violinist
- Bjarne Brustad (1895–1978), composer
- Arild Sandvold (1895–1984), organist
- Ludvig Nielsen (1906–2001), composer
- Frithjof Spalder (1896–1985), composer
- Reidar Thommessen (1889–1986), composer

== Awards ==
- King's Medal of Merit in gold, 1921
- Litteris et Artibus, a Swedish royal medal
- Ordre des Palmes Académiques, a French national order

== Works ==
- Moderne Violinmusik. Samling af nyere Komponisters Værker udsatte for Violin med Piano (Modern Violin Music. A Collection of Recent Composers' Works Arranged for Violin with Piano, 1896)
- Praktisk harmonilære (Practical Harmony, 1897)
- Praktisk violinskole I–III (Practical Violin Course 1–3, 1899)
- Melodier til Margrethe Munthes Kom, skal vi synge (Melodies to Margrethe Munthe's Come Shall We Sing, 1907)
