= Sebastian Manz =

German clarinettist (born 1986)

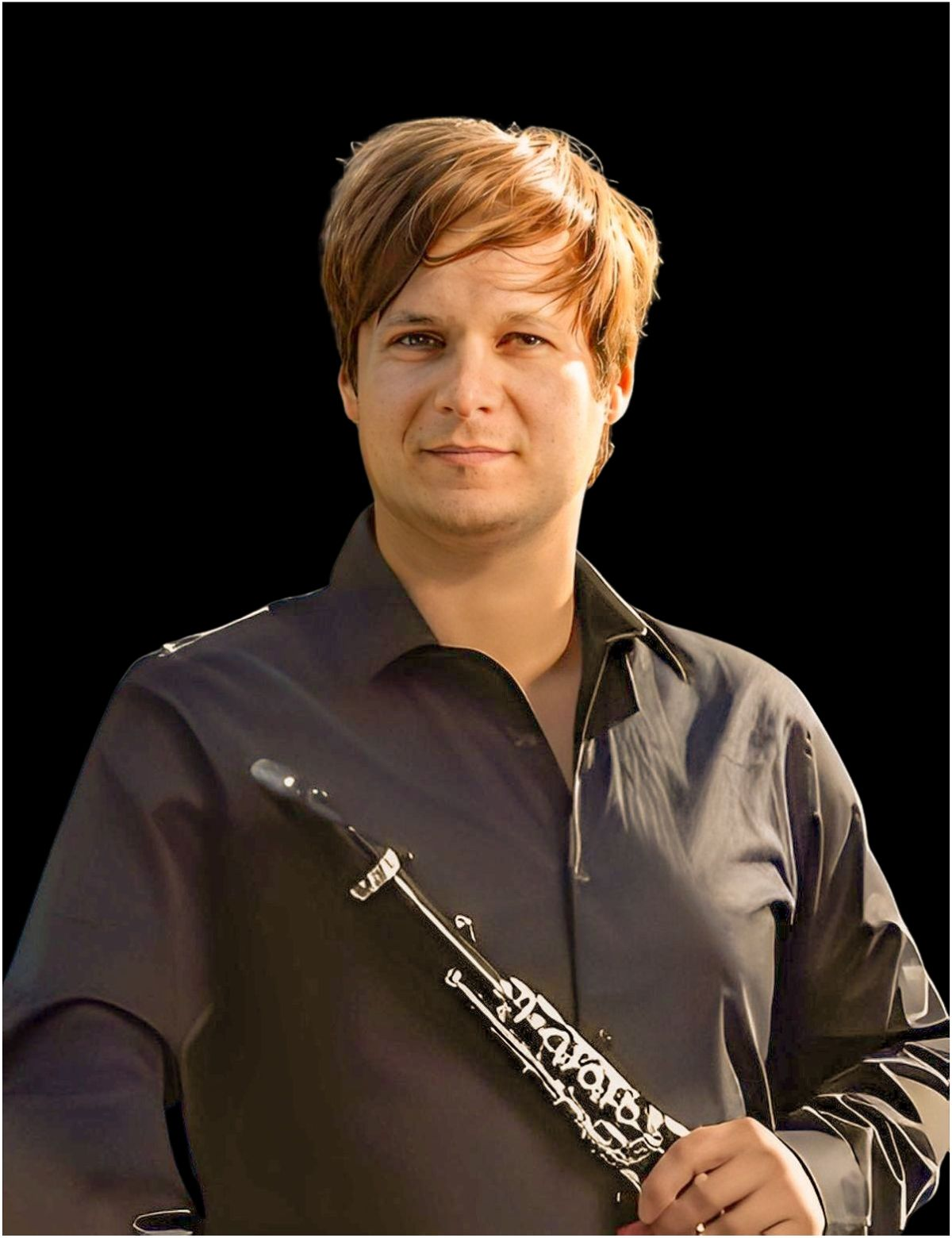
- Manz in 2023

Background information
- Born: 1986 (age 39–40)
- Instrument: Clarinet
- Member of: SWR Symphonieorchester
- Website: sebastianmanz.com

Sebastian Manz (born 1986) is a German clarinetist. He is a solo clarinettist in the SWR Symphonieorchester, an international soloist and chamber musician. He is also active as an arranger and composer.

== Life and work ==
Manz was born in Hanover, the son of the pianists Wolfgang Manz and Julia Goldstein, daughter of the Soviet violinist Boris Goldstein. At the age of six, Manz was a member of a boys' choir in Hanover. He received his first clarinet lessons at the age of seven with Wilfried Berk at the Hanover Music School. From 1994 to 2002, Manz won numerous prizes at Jugend musiziert. In 1997, at the age of eleven, he was accepted as a junior student at the Musikhochschule Lübeck. From 2003 to 2010 he was a regular student there. He studied under Sabine Meyer and Reiner Wehle.

In 1999, Manz made his first tour as a soloist to Poland with the orchestra of the Hanover Music School. He also performed at the EXPO 2000 as a soloist.

In 2006, Manz was invited to the Schubertiade festival in Japan, where he performed both chamber music and as a soloist.

In 2008, Manz won the first prize in clarinet at the ARD International Music Competition, which had not been awarded for 40 years. This was immediately followed by performances with the Bavarian Radio Symphony Orchestra, the SWR Symphonieorchester, the Deutsche Radio Philharmonie Saarbrücken Kaiserslautern and the Collegium Musicum in Basel.

Since 2010, he has been solo clarinetist in the Stuttgart Radio Symphony Orchestra, since 2016 in the SWR Symphonieorchester.

In his debut at the Tonhalle Zürich on 4 May 2010 he played Mozart's Clarinet Concerto with the Nordwestdeutsche Philharmonie conducted by their designated chief conductor Eugene Tzigane. From the 2012–13 to the 2014–15 season he was an artist in the "Junge Wilde" series at the Konzerthaus Dortmund.

Manz participates on the "Rhapsody in School" project founded by Lars Vogt, in which classical musicians go to schools to introduce students to their music.

In the 2017–2018 season, he debuted with the NHK Symphony Orchestra in Tokyo and the Royal Seville Symphony Orchestra.

Manz was invited to the Schwetzingen Festival, Rheingau Musik Festival and Heidelberger Frühling. In the 2021–22 season, he was on an Asia tour with the Chamber Music Society of Lincoln Center with concerts in Taiwan, Japan and China. His chamber music partners have been Felix Klieser, Tanja Tetzlaff and Wen Xiao Zheng, performing Beethoven's Septet. Manz played concerts with the Yomiuri Nippon Symphony Orchestra in Japan. In the 2022–23 season, he was a guest at the Chamber Music Society of Lincoln Center in New York City.

He is also active in the jazz field, predominantly with his own arrangements, which he realises mainly with the jazz musician Sebastian Studnitzky.

== Personal life ==
Manz is married and has a daughter. They live in Ostfildern, Baden-Württemberg.

== Discography ==
- 2008 Die Quintette von Mozart und Beethoven für Klavier und Bläser. Mozart: Quintett Es-Dur KV. 452 for piano, oboe, clarinet, horn and fagott. Beethoven: Quintett Es-Dur op. 16 for piano, oboe, clarinet, horn and fagott. Label: Indésens
- 2008 Mozart – Glière – Korngold. Sebastian Manz with Mozart's clarinet concerto in A major, K 622. Bavarian Radio Symphony Orchestra, Cornelius Meister. Label: BR Klassik
- 2011 DUO RIUL. Works by Brahms, Berg, Debussy, Lutoslawski, Yun (Sebastian Manz, clarinet; Martin Klett, piano) Label: GENUIN
- 2012 Gottfried Hendrik Mann (1858–1904). Clarinet Concerto op. 90. Feest Prelude op. 95. Violin Concerto op.101. Suite no. 3 op. 98. (Sebastian Manz, clarinet; Akiko Amada, violin; Symphonieorchester Osnabrück, conductor: Hermann Bäumer) Label: cpo
- 2012 Christian Wilhelm Westerhoff (1763–1806). Clarinet Concerto op. 5. Concerto for Clarinet, Bassoon & Orchestra. Symphony in E flat major. (Sebastian Manz, clarinet; Albrecht Holder, bassoon; Symphonieorchester Osnabrück, conductor: Hermann Bäumer) Label: cpo
- 2013 In Rhythm. Works by Gerswhin, Reich, Piazzolla, Copland, Templeton, Villa-Lobos, Bernstein und Milhaud (Sebastian Manz, clarinet; Martin Klett, piano) Label:CAvi
- 2014 Fuchs & Brahms, Clarinet Quintets, Sebastian Manz, Danish String Quartet
- 2017 variation5, Compositions by Malcolm Arnold, Jean Françaix, Paul Hindemith and Carl Nielsen. Magali Mosnier, Ramón Ortega Quero, Sebastian Manz, David Fernández Alonso and Marc Trénel, Label: EDEL/Berlin Classics
- 2017 Carl Maria von Weber, Complete works for clarinet. Sebastian Manz, Stuttgart Radio Symphony Orchestra, Antonio Méndez, casalQuartett, Martin Klett, piano and Lars Olaf Schaper, Double bass, Label: EDEL/Berlin Classics
- 2019 A Bernstein Story, Compositions by Leonard Bernstein, Igor Strawinsky and Steve Reich. Sebastian Studnitzky and Sebastian Manz, Label: EDEL / Berlin Classics
- 2020 Father Copland, Compositions by Aaron Copland. WKO Heilbronn, Case Scaglione, Céline Moinet, Sebastian Manz, Wolfgang Bauer, Label: EDEL / Berlin Classics
- 2020 Clarinet Concertos – Nielsen & Lindberg. Nielsen: Serenata in vano, CNW 69. Clarinet Concerto, Op. 57. Lindberg: Clarinet Concerto. (Sebastian Manz, clarinet; Deutsche Radio Philharmonie Saarbrücken Kaiserslautern, conductors: Dominik Beykirch & Magnus Lindberg) Label: Berlin Classics
- 2022 Compositions for clarinet and piano by Johannes Brahms, Robert Schumann and Niels Wilhelm Gade. Sebastian Manz clarinet, Herbert Schuch piano, Label: EDEL/Berlin Classics

== Awards ==
- 2008 Prize of Deutscher Musikwettbewerb, Duo clarinet/piano with Martin Klett
- 2008 First prize ARD International Music Competition
- 2009 LOTTO-prize of Rheingau Musik Festival
- 2011 ECHO Klassik award in the category "Newcomer of the Year"
- 2012 ECHO Klassik award in the category "Chamber Music Recording of the Year"
- 2017 ECHO Klassik award in the category "Concert Recording of the Year" for the CD "Carl Maria von Weber, Complete works for clarinet."
- 2020 Opus Klassik award in the category "Klassik ohne Grenzen" ("Classical Music without Borders") for the 2019 album A Bernstein Story with Sebastian Studnitzky
- 2020 Lincoln Center's Emerging Artist Award
