= Danish String Quartet =

Danish musical group

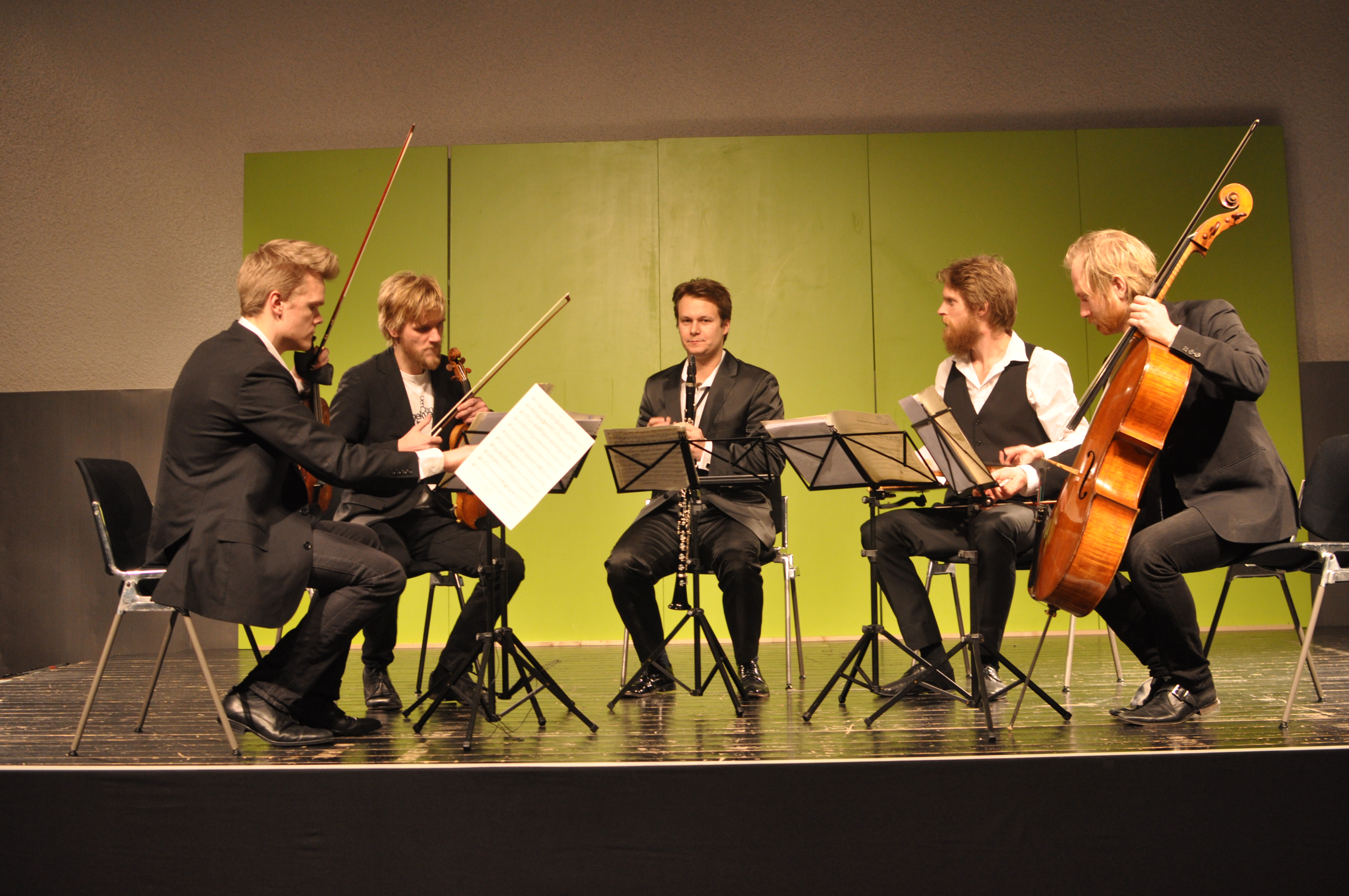
Danish String Quartet and clarinetist Sebastian Manz, Heidelberger Frühling, 2013

The Danish String Quartet made its debut at the Copenhagen Summer Festival in 2002. The group is known for its performances of classical music as well as its own renditions of traditional Nordic folk music. The quartet has also worked with an extensive range of contemporary Scandinavian composers.

== Current members ==
- Rune Tonsgaard Sørensen (born 1983), violin
- Frederik Øland (born 1984), violin
- Asbjørn Nørgaard (born 1984), viola
- Fredrik Schøyen Sjölin (born 1982), cello

== History ==
Violinists Frederik Øland and Rune Tonsgaard Sørensen and violist Asbjørn Nørgaard first met as children at a Danish music summer camp, where they played both football and music together. They later formed a serious string quartet during their teens while studying at the Royal Academy of Music, Copenhagen. At that time, the ensemble was known as the Young Danish String Quartet. In 2008, the group was joined by Norwegian cellist Fredrik Schøyen Sjölin, prompting a change of name to the Danish String Quartet. The quartet’s primary teacher and mentor was Tim Frederiksen, and they have taken part in master classes with the Tokyo and Emerson String Quartets, Alasdair Tait, Paul Katz, Hugh Maguire, Levon Chilingirian, and Gábor Takács-Nagy. Since 2007, the ensemble has curated its own annual event, the DSQ Festival, in Copenhagen. In 2016, they launched Series of Four, their concert series held in the concert hall of the Royal Danish Academy of Music. In 2013, the quartet began a three-year appointment as members of the Chamber Music Society of Lincoln Center's CMS Two Program. They were named a BBC Radio 3 New Generation Artist ensemble for 2013–15, and Musical America named them Ensemble of the Year in 2019. In 2024, the quartet released its third folk-music album, Keel Road.

== Awards and recognition ==
- Danish Radio P2 Chamber Music Competition, First Prize and Audience Prize (2004)
- Jacob Gade Award (2004)
- Trondheim International String Quartet Competition, shared First Prize and Audience Prize (2005)
- Charles Hennen International Chamber Music Competition, First Prize (2005)
- Vagn Holmboe String Quartet Competition, First Prize (2005)
- Danish Music Critics Association Artist Award (2005)
- London International String Quartet Competition, First Prize, Beethoven Prize, Sidney Griller Award, 20th century Prize, Menton Festival Prize (2009)
- Mecklenburg-Vorpommern Festival, NORDMETALL-Ensemble Prize (2010)
- Carl Nielsen Prize (2011)
- Wilhelm Hansen Prize (2015)
- Borletti-Buitoni Trust Award (2016)

In 2017, NPR Music named the quartet's second folk music album, Last Leaf, the Best Classical Album of 2017; in 2019, the quartet was nominated for a Grammy Award for Best Chamber Music/Small Ensemble Performance for its album Prism I.

- Léonie Sonning Music Prize (2025)

== Discography ==
Performance of Haydn's String Quartet No. 42 in C major, Op. 54, No. 2, Hob.III:57 (May 2015)

- Keel Road (ECM Records, 2024)
- Prism V (ECM Records, 2023)
- Prism IV (ECM Records, 2022)
- Prism III (ECM Records, 2021)
- Prism II (ECM Records, 2019)
- Prism I (ECM Records, 2018)
- Last Leaf (ECM Records, 2017)
- Adès, Nørgård & Abrahamsen (ECM Records 2016)
- Brahms/Fuchs: Clarinet Quintets with clarinetist Sebastian Manz (CAvi-music, 2014)
- Wood Works (Dacapo Records, 2014)
- Haydn/Brahms (CAvi-music, 2012)
- Nielsen: String Quartets, Vol. 2 (Dacapo Records, 2008)
- Nielsen: String Quartets, Vol. 1 (Dacapo Records, 2007)
