= Symphony No. 7 (Henze) =

Symphony by Hans Werner Henze

The Seventh Symphony by the German composer Hans Werner Henze was written in 1983–84. It was commissioned by the Berliner Philharmoniker as part of the orchestra's centenary celebrations in 1982.

Unlike its immediate predecessors, Henze has stated that this work is very much a 'German' symphony, in the Beethovenian tradition. Accordingly, it is cast in four movements and is broadly analogous to the 'classical' form: Introduction, slow movement, Scherzo and Finale. However Henze uses even more traditional German motifs across the movements: an allemande (a German dance) in the first and Liedform in the second. For the two final movements he focuses on the eighteenth-century poet Friedrich Hölderlin, incarcerated at Tübingen where he was subjected to what amounted to torture in the name of medical intervention. The final movement is a deeply lyrical orchestral setting of Hölderlin's late poem Hälfte des Lebens (Half of Life).

== Performances ==
The premiere was given by the Berliner Philharmoniker under Gianluigi Gelmetti in 1984. In that performance the work took 44 minutes. Sir Simon Rattle's 1992 recording takes 38 minutes, and Marek Janowski's 2007 recording slightly under 35.

== Movements ==
There are four movements:

1. Tanz – Lebhaft und beseelt (Dance – lively and inspired)
2. Ruhig bewegt (Moving calmly)
3. Unablässig in Bewegung (Incessantly in motion)
4. Ruhig, verhalten (Calm, held back)
