= Shanghai Philharmonic Orchestra =

Orchestra based in Shanghai, China

The Shanghai Philharmonic Orchestra (SPO; Chinese: 上海爱乐乐团; pinyin: Shànghǎi Àiyuè Yuètuán) is a professional symphony orchestra based in Shanghai, China. It is under the administration of the Shanghai Municipal Administration of Culture, Radio, Film, and TV. The current music director is Muhai Tang and the deputy director is the young conductor Liang Zhang.

== History ==
According to the orchestra's official web site, the orchestra was re-structured based on the former Shanghai Broadcasting Symphony Orchestra (SBSO). SBSO was merged from two orchestras – Shanghai Film Orchestra, which was established in 1954 and Shanghai Broadcasting Orchestra, which was established in 1950. The merge happened in 1996, and the new orchestra was named Shanghai Broadcasting Symphony Orchestra with Yongyan Hu as its first music director. The name of the orchestra was officially changed to the Shanghai Philharmonic Orchestra in April 2004 with famous conductor Zuohuang Chen as its Music Director, adopting the world’s most prevalent system of music seasons.

When Muhai Tang took over the music director position in 2009, he told the journalist that the orchestra was not going to focus on overseas. Tang said they had to consider why the audience would like to listen to the music and how they could play the music well. He believed that the orchestra should be based on Chinese cultural values.

== Repertoire ==
The SPO plays in neighborhood concerts, concerts promoting youthful Chinese soloists or Chinese composers, and concerts related to government activities, but they also perform challenging repertoire. In the 2011-2012 and 2012-2013 concert seasons they performed a series of Mahler symphonies, Bartók's Bluebeard's Castle, and a condensed version of Wagner's Ring Cycle. From 2015, upon close cooperation with the Shanghai Conservatory of Music, SPO has hosted Hearing China concert series and commissioned composers around the world to compose for SPO and Chinese instruments.

The orchestra has also made recordings. Most of these were orchestrated Chinese music and classical music composed by Chinese composers, made with the labels under Naxos such as Marco Polo, Yellow River and Naxos itself.

== See also ==
- Shanghai Symphony Orchestra
