= Due date =

Due date may refer to

- Due date (payment), the last valid day of payment for an invoice
- Due date (pregnancy), the estimated delivery date for a pregnant woman
- Due Date, a 2010 American movie
- Due Date, a 2011 solo exhibition by American artist Brian Adam Douglas
- “Due Date”, an episode in season 6 of the Canadian TV series Holmes on Homes

== See also ==
- Due (disambiguation)
- Date due slip
