= Due, Georgia =

Coordinates: 34°46′58″N 84°16′40″W

Due is a ghost town in Fannin County, Georgia, United States.

Prior to European colonization, the area where Due was located was inhabited by the Cherokee people and other Indigenous peoples for thousands of years.

A post office called Due was established in 1895, and remained in operation until 1943. The origin of the name "Due" is unknown.
