= Mary Barratt Due =

Norwegian pianist (1888–1969)

Mary Louise Barratt Due
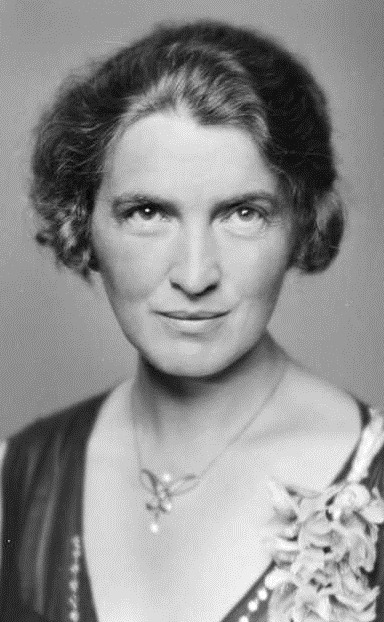
- Barratt Due, about 1930

Background information
- Born: Mary Louise Barratt; 9 April 1888; Bergen. Norway
- Died: 24 December 1969 (aged 81) Oslo, Norway
- Genres: Classical
- Occupation: Musician
- Instrument: Piano

Mary Louise Barratt Due (9 April 1888 – 24 December 1969) was known as one of the most influential Norwegian pianists in the 20th century. She was the daughter of the pastor Thomas Ball Barratt and the preacher Laura Barratt, née Jakobson. In 1916 she married the violinist Henrik Adam Due, and together they founded the Barratt Due Institute of Music in 1927. Their children were the musicians Stephan Henrik Barratt-Due and Esther Barratt-Due.

== Biography ==
Barratt Due was born in Bergen, Norway, but the family moved the following year to Kristiania (Oslo), where her father was a minister in the Methodist Church. Growing up in the Oslo borough of Grünerløkka was happy, in a home harmonious and full of music. Both parents played and sang, and her father's daily morning devotions attended all the family in the song. Barratt Due received piano lessons at an early age. 10 years old, she got an exemption from the age limit of 12 years and attended the Oslo Musikkonservatorium. With a scholarship, she traveled as a 14-year-old to Rome, Italy, to study at the St. Cecilia Academy. Here she spent six years in an international and exuberant musical environment, where also theory and language were part of the curriculum, and in 1906 she made her debut in Oslo, and in 1907 she took a diploma exam in Italy.

As a teacher of piano, she composer, pianist and Liszt pupil Giovanni Sgambati. Through him she had first-hand knowledge of the interpretation of Liszt and Chopin, who would later become her favourite composers. In 1906 she made her debut in Kristiania with rave reviews. Back in Rome she completed her graduation music diploma in 1907 and gave several concerts. She performed extensively beside teaching at the institute. Apart from Liszt and Chopin, she was also open to the new style of Impressionism in music, and was among the first in Norway to put Claude Debussy on the schedule. She released Norsk pianoskole in 1931, together with the composer Eyvind Alnæs, and was president of the Soroptimist movement from 1948.

Mary Barratt Due died in Oslo in 1969, aged 81.

== Publications ==
- 1931: Norsk Pianoskole (Norwegian Piano School) together with Eyvind Alnæs (in Norwegian)
- 1957: Musikkinntrykk fra Amerika (Musical impressions from America), chronicle in Aftenposten 15 April 1957 (in Norwegian)
