= Henrik Adam Due =

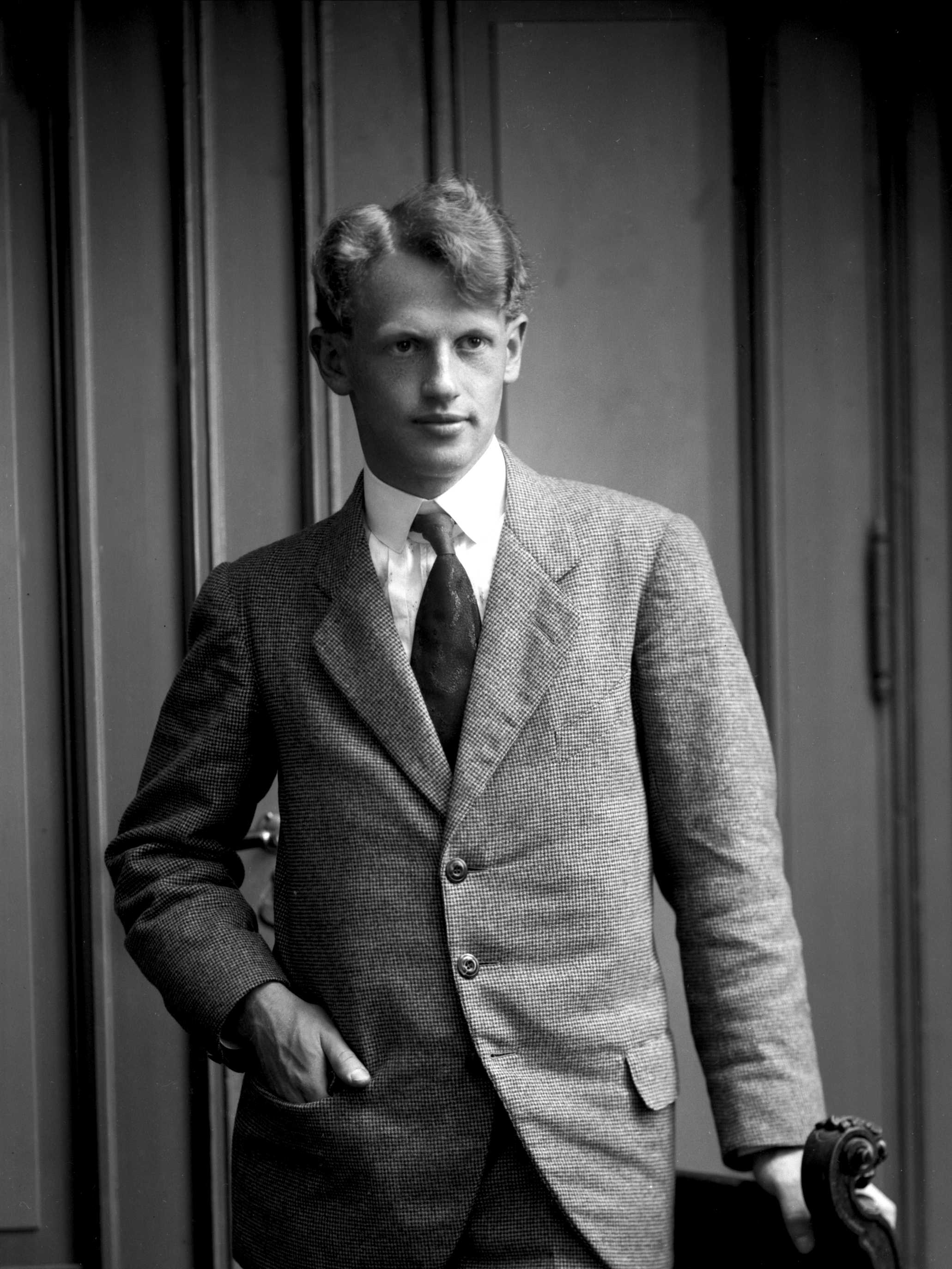
- Henrik Adam Due in 1914

Background information
- Born: 19 April 1891; Saint Paul, Minnesota
- Origin: Norway
- Died: 13 May 1966 (aged 75) Oslo
- Genres: Classical
- Occupations: Musician, music teacher
- Instrument: Violin

Henrik Adam Due (19 April 1891 – 13 May 1966) was a Norwegian violinist originally from Saint Paul, Minnesota, and the son of physician Elias Kristian Jensen Due (1845–1931) and Elen Henriette Due (née Broch, 1853–1926), married 1916 to pianist Mary Barratt Due (née Barratt, 1888–1969), and together they had the children Ester Henriette Fladmoe (née Barrat-Due, 1917–1999) married 1940 to Arvid Fladmoe (1915–93), and Stephan Henrik Barrat-Due (1919–1985).

== Biography ==
He studied with Arve Arvesen and Gustav Fredrik Lange, and with Parisian Martin Pierre Joseph Marsick. He debuted in 1913 and was a permanent employee of Oslo Philharmonic Orchestra (1921–41). He married Mary Barratt Due in 1916 and together they founded the Barratt Due Institute of Music in 1927. Dues students include Arvid Fladmoe, Stephan Henrik Barrat-Due, Kai Angel Næsteby and Kåre Fuglesang.

== Publications ==
- 1928: Hvad enhver fiolinspiller bør vite (What every violin player should know) (in Norwegian)
- 1953: Norsk Fiolinskole (Norwegian Violin School) (in Norwegian)
