= Sergio Azzolini =

Italian bassoonist and conductor (born 1967)

Sergio Azzolini (born 1967, in Bolzano) is an Italian bassoonist and music conductor.

== Early life ==
Azzolini was born in Bolzano, Italy in 1967 and learned bassoon after his mother suggested being a musician would provide a long term job for him.

He studied from 1978 to 1985 at Conservatorio Claudio Monteverdi in Bolzano with Romano Santi and then at Hochschule für Musik, Theater und Medien Hannover, with Klaus Thunemann until 1989. At this time, he was already a soloist in the European Union Youth Orchestra.

== Career ==
Azzolini has won awards at "Prague Spring", "C.M. von Weber" Competition and "ARD Münich". He has recorded many productions of chamber music and soloistic performances for EMI records, Naïve, Sony and Chandos. He also performs with his ensemble Il Proteo and is a member of Ma'alot Quintetts, Sabine Meyer Bläserensemble, Maurice Bourgue Trio and several ensembles of early music on period instruments - Parnassi Musici, Sonatori della Gioiosa Marca, Kammerakademie Potsdam, Collegium 1704 and Ensemble Capriccio. Azzolini regularly appears as a soloist on authentic historical bassoons with ensembles L'Aura Soave Cremona, La Stravaganza Köln, Sonatori della Gioiosa Marca.

He is working on recording all 39 of Vivaldi's bassoon concerti and has recorded four volumes of Vivaldi's bassoon concertos for the "Vivaldi Edition" of the French recording company Naïve playing with ensembles L'Aura Soave Cremona and L'Onda Armonica.

He was music professor at the Hochschule in Stuttgart, and was professor of bassoon and chamber music at the Hochschule für Musik in Basel from 1998 until 2024.
