= Duer =

Duer is a surname. Notable people with the name include:

- Alice Duer Miller (1874–1942), American poet
- Alva Duer (1904–1987), American college basketball coach
- Carolina Duer (born 1978), Argentine world champion boxer
- Caroline King Duer (1865–1956), American editor and writer
- John Duer (1782–1858), American attorney and jurist
- John Duer Irving (1874–1918), American geologist
- Katherine Duer Mackay (1878–1930), American suffragist and socialite
- Melinda Duer, British chemist
- Roland Duer Irving (1847–1888), American geologist
- Thomas Duer Broughton (1778–1835), English soldier and writer
- William Duer (Continental Congressman) (1743–1799), British–American lawyer, developer, and land speculator
- William Duer (U.S. Congressman) (1805–1879), American lawyer and statesman
- William Alexander Duer (1780–1858), American lawyer and judge
