= Echo Klassik =

German classical music award (1994–2018)

The Echo Klassik, often stylized as ECHO Klassik, was Germany's major classical music award in 22 categories. The award, presented by the Deutsche Phono-Akademie, was given annually, usually in October or September, separate from its parent award, the Echo Music Prize. The Echo Klassik was disestablished in 2018 and replaced by the Opus Klassik.

== Ceremonies ==
#	Year	Date	Female Singer of the Year	Male Singer of the Year	Conductor of the Year	Host(s)	Venue
1	1994	March 24, 1994	Cecilia Bartoli (La Cenerentola (G. Rossini), Orchestra e Coro del Teatro Comunale di Bologna, Riccardo Chailly)	Ben Heppner (Turandot (G. Puccini), Munich Radio Orchestra, Bayerischer Rundfunk Chorus, Roberto Abbado)	Simon Rattle (Symphony No. 7 (H. W. Henze), City of Birmingham Symphony Orchestra)	Senta Berger	Flora Botanical Garden
2	1995	March 30, 1995	Anne Sofie von Otter Marienkantaten und Arien (G.F. Händel), Musica Antiqua Köln, Reihnard Goebel	Thomas Hampson Des Knaben Wunderhorn (G. Mahler), Geoffrey Parsons (Klavier)	John Eliot Gardiner 9 Symphonies (L. v. Beethoven), Orchestre Révolutionnaire et Romantique	Senta Berger	Rathaus Hamburg
3	1996	September 15, 1996	Montserrat Caballé Hijo de la luna	Peter Seiffert Festliches Konzert mit Peter Seiffert, Chor & Orchester der Deutschen Oper Berlin, Heinz Wallberg, Jiri Kout	Giuseppe Sinopoli 4 Symphonien (R. Schumann), Staatskapelle Dresden	Senta Berger and Gunther Emmerlich	Semperoper, Dresden
4	1997	September 14, 1997	Cecilia Bartoli Chant D'Amour, Meldoies Francaises	Thomas Hampson Das Lied von der Erde (G. Mahler)	Bruno Weil Piano Concertos Nos. 1 & 2 (L. v. Beethoven)	Senta Berger und Jochen Kowalski	Prinzregententheater Munich
5	1998	October 25, 1998	Waltraud Meier Sings Wagner, Symphonieorchester des Bayerischen Rundfunks, Lorin Maazel	Thomas Quasthoff Mozart Arias, Württembergisches Kammerorchester Heilbronn, Jörg Faerber	Ingo Metzmacher Sinfonie Nr. 9 (H. W. Henze), Berliner Philharmoniker	Senta Berger und Roger Willemsen	Laeiszhalle Hamburg
6	1999	October 24, 1999	Edita Gruberová La Sonnambula (Vincenzo Bellini), Münchner Rundfunkorchester, Marcello Viotti	José Cura Samson & Dalila (Saint-Saens), London Symphony Orchestra & Chorus, Sir Colin Davis	Lorin Maazel L'Histoire du Soldat (Stravinsky), Symphonieorchester des Bayerischen Rundfunks	Senta Berger und Roger Willemsen	Deutsches Nationaltheater Weimar
7	2000	October 22, 2000	Anne Sofie von Otter Bengt Forsberg (Klavier), Four Shakespeare Songs Op. 31, Desdemonas Song (E.W. Korngold)	Marcelo Álvarez Tomo y obligo (C. Gardel), N. Marconi (Bandoneon), F. Suarez-Paz (Violine), P. Ziegler (Klavier), M. Cardozo (Gitarre), H. Console (Bass), J. Calandrelli (Dirigent)	Daniel Barenboim	Senta Berger und Roger Willemsen	Schauspielhaus am Gendarmenmarkt, Berlin
8	2001	September 30, 2001	Barbara Frittoli Don Giovanni (W.A. Mozart)	Ramón Vargas La Favorite	Günter Wand	Senta Berger und Roger Willemsen	Festspielhaus Baden-Baden
9	2002	October 13, 2002	Angela Gheorghiu Casta Diva	Marcelo Álvarez French Arias	Claudio Abbado	Senta Berger	Alte Oper Frankfurt
10	2003	October 26, 2003	Vesselina Kasarova Nuit Resplendissante, French Opera Arias	Salvatore Licitra E lucevan le stelle	Simon Rattle Symphony No. 5 (G. Mahler)	Senta Berger	Konzerthaus Dortmund
12	2004	October 24, 2004	Anna Netrebko Opera Arias	Thomas Quasthoff Romantische Lieder, Schubert Lieder	–	Senta Berger	Gasteig, Munich
13	2005	October 16, 2005	Anna Netrebko Sempre libera	Rolando Villazón Französische Opernarien (Gounod, Massenet)	Claudio Abbado Debussy, Mahler – "La mer", Symphony No. 2	Senta Berger	Gasteig, Munich
14	2006	October 22, 2006	Cecilia Bartoli G.F. Händel, A. Caldara: Opera Proibita	Bryn Terfel Simple Gifts	Daniel Barenboim L. v. Beethoven, W. A. Mozart: Das Ramallah Konzert	Maria Furtwängler	Gasteig, Munich
15	2007	October 21, 2007	Elīna Garanča Aria Cantilena	Simon Keenlyside Tales Of Opera	Mariss Jansons Shostakovich: Symphonies	Maria Furtwängler	Gasteig, Munich
16	2008	October 19, 2008	Cecilia Bartoli Maria	Philippe Jaroussky Carestini – The Story of a Castrato	Michael Gielen Schönberg, Arnold: Gurrelieder	Götz Alsmann and Natalia Wörner	Gasteig, Munich
17	2009	October 18, 2009	Elīna Garanča Bel Canto	Christian Gerhaher Robert Schumann, Melancholie	Sylvain Cambreling Olivier Messiaen, Works for Orchestra	Götz Alsmann und Natalia Wörner	Semperoper, Dresden
18	2010	October 17, 2010	Joyce DiDonato Colbran, The Muse	Jonas Kaufmann Sehnsucht	Paavo Järvi Beethoven: Symphony No. 2 & 6 "Pastoral"	Thomas Gottschalk	Saalbau Essen
19	2011	October 2, 2011	Simone Kermes Colori d'Amore	Thomas Hampson Des Knaben Wunderhorn	Andris Nelsons Stravinsky: Firebird	Thomas Gottschalk	Saalbau Essen
20	2012	October 14, 2012	Renée Fleming Poèmes	Klaus Florian Vogt Helden	Riccardo Chailly Beethoven Symphonies	Nina Eichinger and Rolando Villazón	Konzerthaus Berlin
21	2013	October 6, 2013	Joyce DiDonato Drama Queens	Jonas Kaufmann Wagner	Esa-Pekka Salonen Lutosławski: The Symphonies	Nina Eichinger and Rolando Villazón	Konzerthaus Berlin
22	2014	October 26, 2014	Anna Netrebko Verdi	Piotr Beczała Rigoletto	Yannick Nézet-Séguin Stravinsky & Stokowski	Nina Eichinger and Rolando Villazón	Gasteig, Munich
23	2015	October 18, 2015	Joyce DiDonato Stella di Napoli	Jonas Kaufmann Du bist die Welt für mich	David Zinman Gustav Mahler: Das Lied von der Erde & Ferruccio Busoni: Berceuse élégiaque	Nina Eichinger and Rolando Villazón	Konzerthaus Berlin
24	2016	October 9, 2016	Anna Netrebko Macbeth	Philippe Jaroussky Green: Mélodies françaises sur des poèmes de Verlaine	Antonio Pappano Verdi: Aida	Thomas Gottschalk	Konzerthaus Berlin
25	2017	October 29, 2017	Joyce DiDonato In War & Peace	Matthias Goerne Mahler, Berio: Sinfonia/10 Frühe Lieder	Kent Nagano Richard Strauss: Eine Alpensinfonie	Thomas Gottschalk	Elbphilharmonie Hamburg
