= Stephan Barratt-Due =

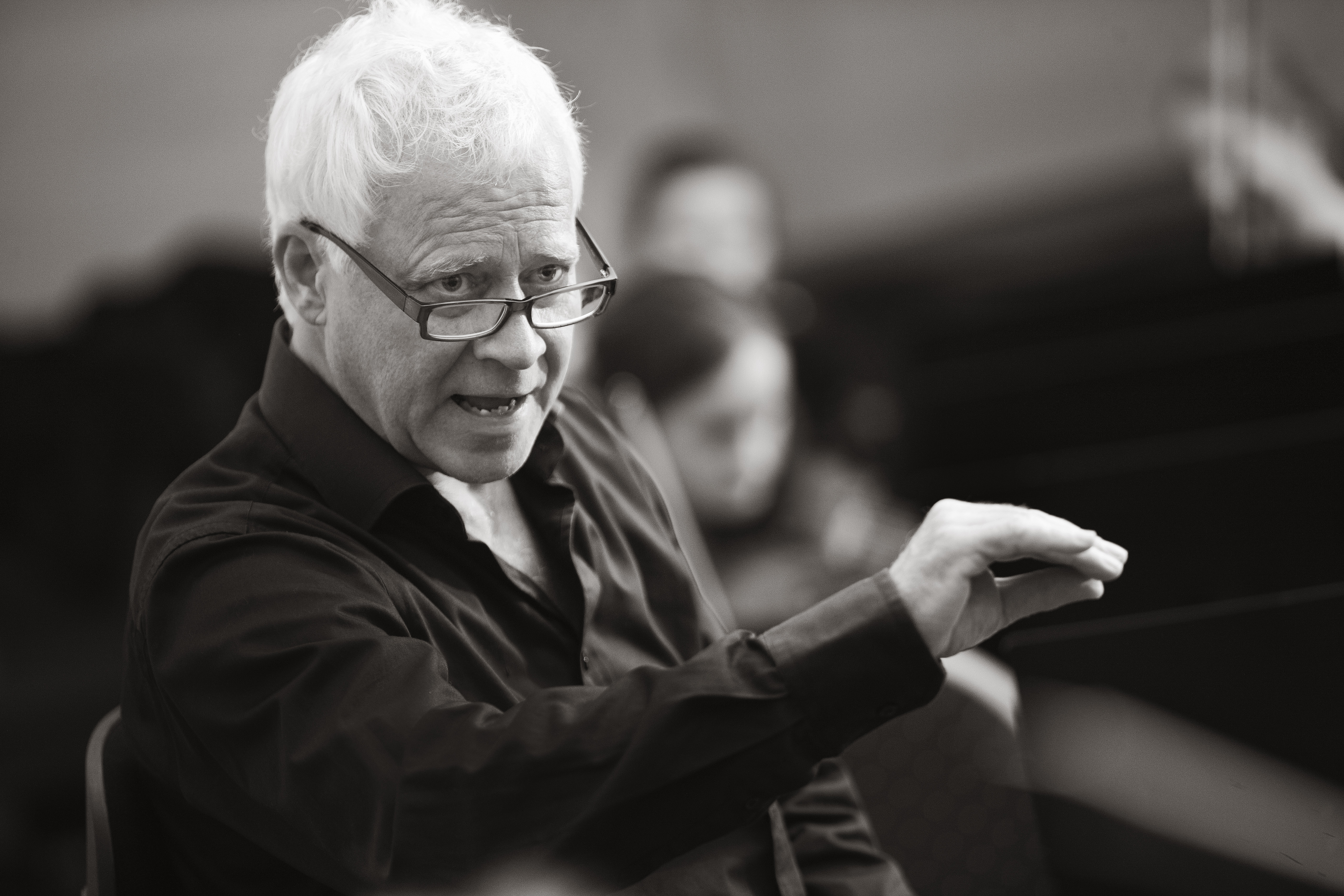

Background information
- Born: Stephan Henrik Barrat-Due Jr. 1 June 1956; Oslo
- Origin: Norway
- Genres: Classical
- Occupations: Musician, music teacher
- Instrument: Violin
- Spouse: Soon-Mi Chung
- Website: barrattdue.no/nor/hoyskole/larere/stephan_barratt-due

Stephan Henrik Barratt-Due Jr. (born 1 June 1956 in Oslo, Norway) is a Norwegian violinist, the son of violinist Stephan Henrik Barrat-Due (1919–1985) and Else Barratt-Due (b. Holst, June 1925).

== Biography ==
Barrat-Due started his violin studies with his father at an early age. Later he attended the Norwegian Academy of Music and continued his studies in the Netherlands, Switzerland and the United States. He debuted in 1981, gave numerous concerts in Europe, the United States and Asia, and has been the artistic director of the Barratt Due Institute of Music from 1985. He has been the artistic director of the Kristiansand Symphony Orchestra (1990–96), and an initiator and artistic leader of the Kristiansand Chamber Music Festival. Barrat-Due also has had extensive chamber musical collaboration with his former wife.

== Honors ==
- 2003: First class Knight of the Order of St. Olav
- 2012: The Norwegian Arts Council Honorary Award, together with Soon-Mi Chung

== Discography (in selection) ==
- 1986: Christian Sinding: Serenade For To Fioliner Og Klaver, Opus 92 / Serenade For To Fioliner Og Klaver, Opus 56 (Norsk Kulturråds Klassikerserie)
- 1988: Johan Halvorsen: Norwegian Rhapsody No 1 & 2 • Norwegian Festival Overture Op. 16 • Entry Of The Boyars • Bergensiana, (Roccoco Variations) • Andante Religioso • Wedding March • Passacaglia (Norsk Kulturråds Klassikerserie), with Bergen Philharmonic Orchestra directed by Karsten Andersen
- 1994: Mozart, Nordheim, Hvoslef: DuoDu (Victoria Records), with Soon-Mi Chung
- 2006: Grieg: Holberg Suite • Melodies For String Orchestra (Naxos Records), with Oslo Camerata
