= Soon-Mi Chung =

South Korean violinist (born 1952)

- Born: 22 February 1952; Seoul
- Origin: South Korea
- Genre: Classical
- Occupations: Musician, music teacher
- Instruments: Violin, viola
- Website: barrattdue.no/nor/hoyskole/larere/soon-mi_chung

Korean name
- Hangul: 정순미
- RR: Jeong Sunmi
- MR: Chŏng Sunmi

Soon-Mi Chung (Korean: 정순미; born 22 February 1952) is a South Korean-born Norwegian musician (viola, viola) and musical director.

== Biography ==
Chung is a music teacher at the Barratt Due Institute of Music and artistic director of Barratt Dues Juniororkester. She got her musical education at the Conservatory of Music in Paris, Menuhin Music Academy and San Francisco Conservatory, and debuted in Oslo in 1982.

== Honors ==
- 1998: Oslo City Culture Award
- 2007: The Lindeman Prize
- 2010: Anders Jahre's Culture Award
- 2012: Norsk kulturråds ærespris

== Discography (in selection) ==
- 1986: Christian Sinding: Serenade For To Fioliner Og Klaver, Opus 92 / Serenade For To Fioliner Og Klaver, Opus 56 (Norsk Kulturråds Klassikerserie)
- 1988: Johan Halvorsen: Norwegian Rhapsody No 1 & 2 • Norwegian Festival Overture Op. 16 • Entry Of The Boyars • Bergensiana, (Roccoco Variations) • Andante Religioso • Wedding March • Passacaglia (Norsk Kulturråds Klassikerserie), with Bergen Philharmonic Orchestra directed by Karsten Andersen
- 1994: Mozart, Nordheim, Hvoslef: DuoDu (Victoria Records), with Stephan Barratt-Due
