= Grzegorz Fitelberg International Competition for Conductors =

Polish conducting competition

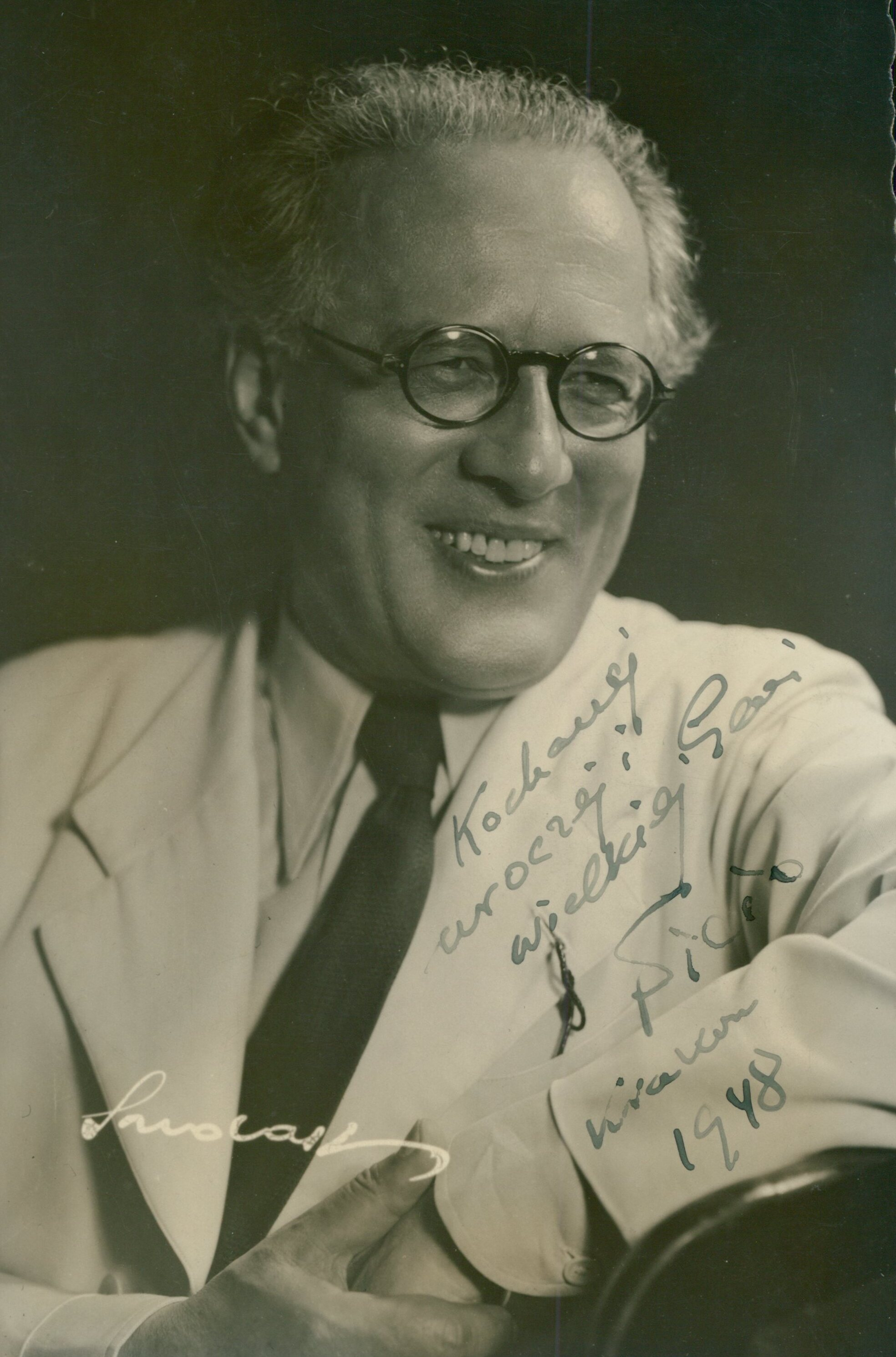
Grzegorz Fitelberg, 1948

The Grzegorz Fitelberg International Competition for Conductors (Polish: Międzynarodowy Konkurs Dyrygentów im. Grzegorza Fitelberga) is one of Poland's premier conducting competitions. Named in honour of Grzegorz Fitelberg (1879–1953), the competition was admitted as a member of the World Federation of International Music Competitions (WFIMC) based in Geneva IN 1980.

The Grzegorz Fitelberg International Competition for Conductors was founded in 1979 by Karol Stryja, student of Fitelberg and director of the Silesian Philharmonic, who led all its editions until his death in 1998. According to composer Witold Lutosławski: "Fitelberg made a large contribution to Poland’s composing heritage. He was a pivotal figure in promoting young Polish music, without whom creators of the time would not have been able to develop their talents and gain necessary experience".

It is open to all young conductors who are under 35 years of age on its opening day. The repertoire includes a range of music styles, including Viennese Classicism, Romanticism and 20th-century classical music, including works by Polish composers. The Grzegorz Fitelberg International Competition for Conductors is held in Katowice every 5 years (10th edition, 2017). In previous years, the competition was held at 4-year intervals. The 6th edition will take place in 2023.

== The competition ==
The Grzegorz Fitelberg International Competition for Conductors is one of the most prestigious performance competitions in Poland, since 1982 belonging to the World Federation of International Music Competitions in Geneva. It is addressed to artists younger than 39. Its renown and the prestige associated with winning any place on the podium open a path to a world carrier for young conductors. Since its very beginning, the competition has been organised by the Silesian Philharmonic, which ever since the first years of its existence has been strongly connected with the figure of the patron of the competition. He was a regular on the stage of this institution, where he performed together with the Polish National Radio Symphony Orchestra. His ideas were implemented in the Philharmonic in Katowice with particular respect by its director of many years, Karol Stryja, Grzegorz Fitelberg’s student, the only one Fitelberg had ever prepared for the diploma.

After two all-Poland’s editions (1970 and 1974), on Fitelberg’s 100th birthday, the 1st International Competition for Conductors commemorating him was held, with Karol Stryja as his initiator. Ever since then, the Silesian Philharmonic has been an extremely important centre of educating and discovering new conducting talents.

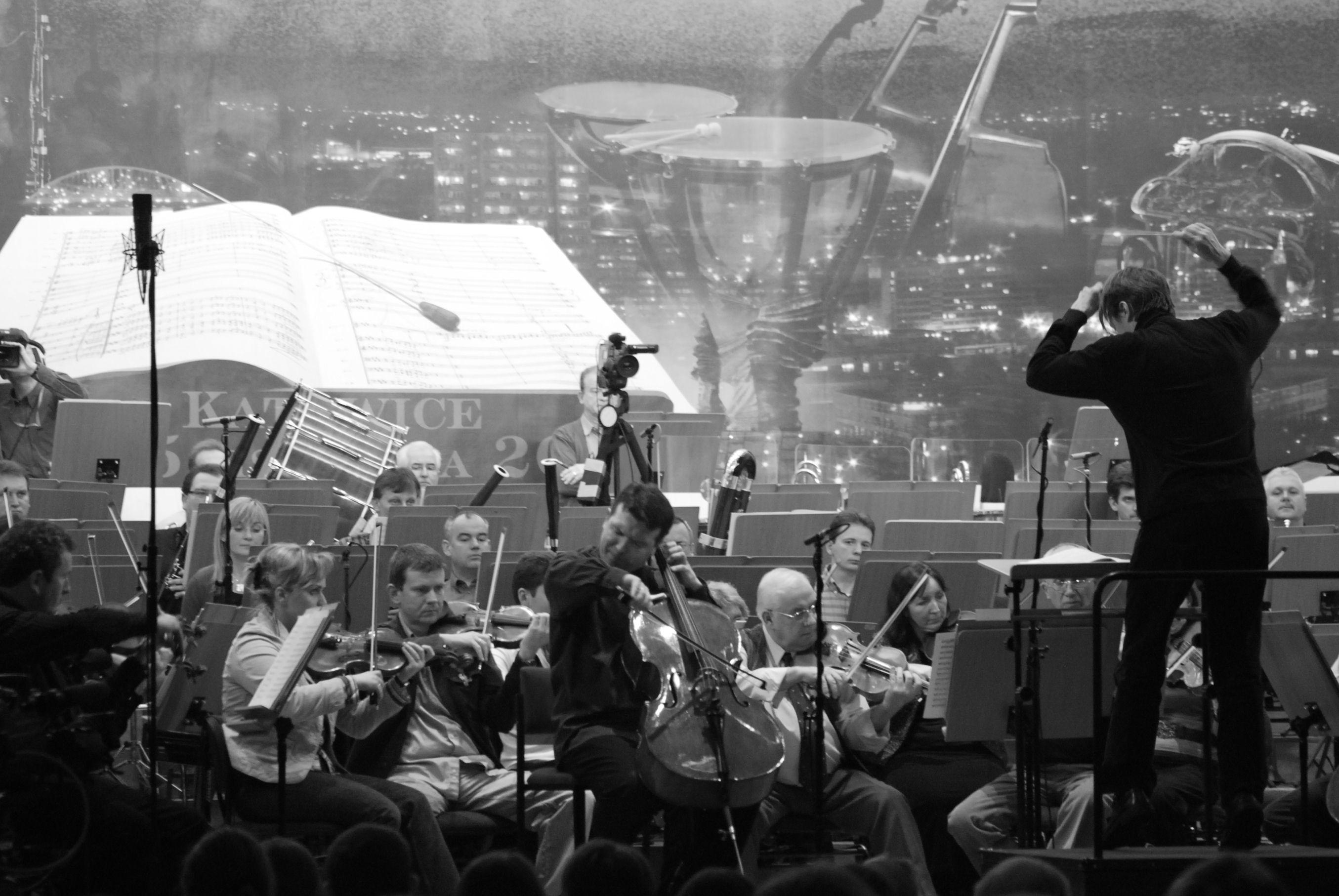
8th edition of Grzegorz Fitelberg International Competition for Conductors, Katowice, 2007

The competition is accompanied by measures which contribute to commemorating its patron – one of the most acclaimed Polish conductors. They comprise not only initiatives promoting the competition itself, but also publications, exhibitions, and studies resulting in monographs.

Since its very beginnings, the Grzegorz Fitelberg International Competition for Conductors has been attracting distinguished personalities. Such artists as Stanisław Wisłocki, Karol Stryja, Sir Charles Groves, Juozas Domarkas, Jan Krenz, Pierre Colombo, Marianne Granvig, Tadeusz Strugała, Stanisław Skrowaczewski, as well as winners in previous editions of the competition, including Chikara Imamura, Michael Zilm, Mirosław Błaszczyk, Marek Pijarowski, Jerzy Salwarowski, Patrick Fournillier, Andreas Weiss, Victoria Zhadko, Tomasz Bugaj, Piotr Gajewski, Eugeniusz Knapik, Jorma Panula, and Ken Takaseki have sat on the jury of the competition. Over the years, the group of winners has included such names as Claus Peter Flor, Uri Mayer, Tadeusz Wojciechowski, Anton Zapf, Makoto Suehiro, Jin Wang, Shin-ik Hahm, Hidehiro Shindori, Achim Fiedler, Massimiliano Caldi, Tomáš Hanus, Charles Olivieri-Munroe, Stephen Ellery, Aleksandar Marković, Modestas Pitrenas, Marko Ivanović, Eugene Tzigane, Lin Chen, Sean Newhouse, Daniel Smith, Marzena Diakun, Azis Sadikovic, as well as Su-Han Yang, Bar Avni, and Modestas Barkauskas, who triumphed at the 10th International Competition for Conductors.

The 1st-8th editions of the competition were held every four years, the subsequent ones – every five years. The 11th edition of this event has been planned six years after the previous one, in 2023, to commemorate the 70th anniversary of Grzegorz Fitelberg’s death. The groundwork for the 11th edition was provided already in 2021, with the announcement of a grant from the budget of the Minister of Culture and National Heritage from the Culture Promotion Fund within the scheme of the programme “Music”, implemented by the National Institute of Music and Dance. Preparations to the 11th Grzegorz Fitelberg International Competition for Conductors comprise – without limitations – concerts, exhibitions, and masterclasses. Their goal is to revive the memory of Grzegorz Fitelberg, to promote Polish music, to search for new conducting talents, and to emphasise the role of the Silesian Philharmonic as the organiser of the competition as an institution that really influences the shape of the world’s leading music scene.

In addition to prize money, the competition also awards a number of special prizes, including invitations to conduct major international orchestras (such as BBC Symphony Orchestra, Orchestra Sinfonica di Milano Giuseppe Verdi, or Moscow Philharmonic Orchestra), which are distributed separately from the main competition prize. These opportunities are intended to assist the most distinguished conductors in starting and developing their international careers.

== Prize winners ==
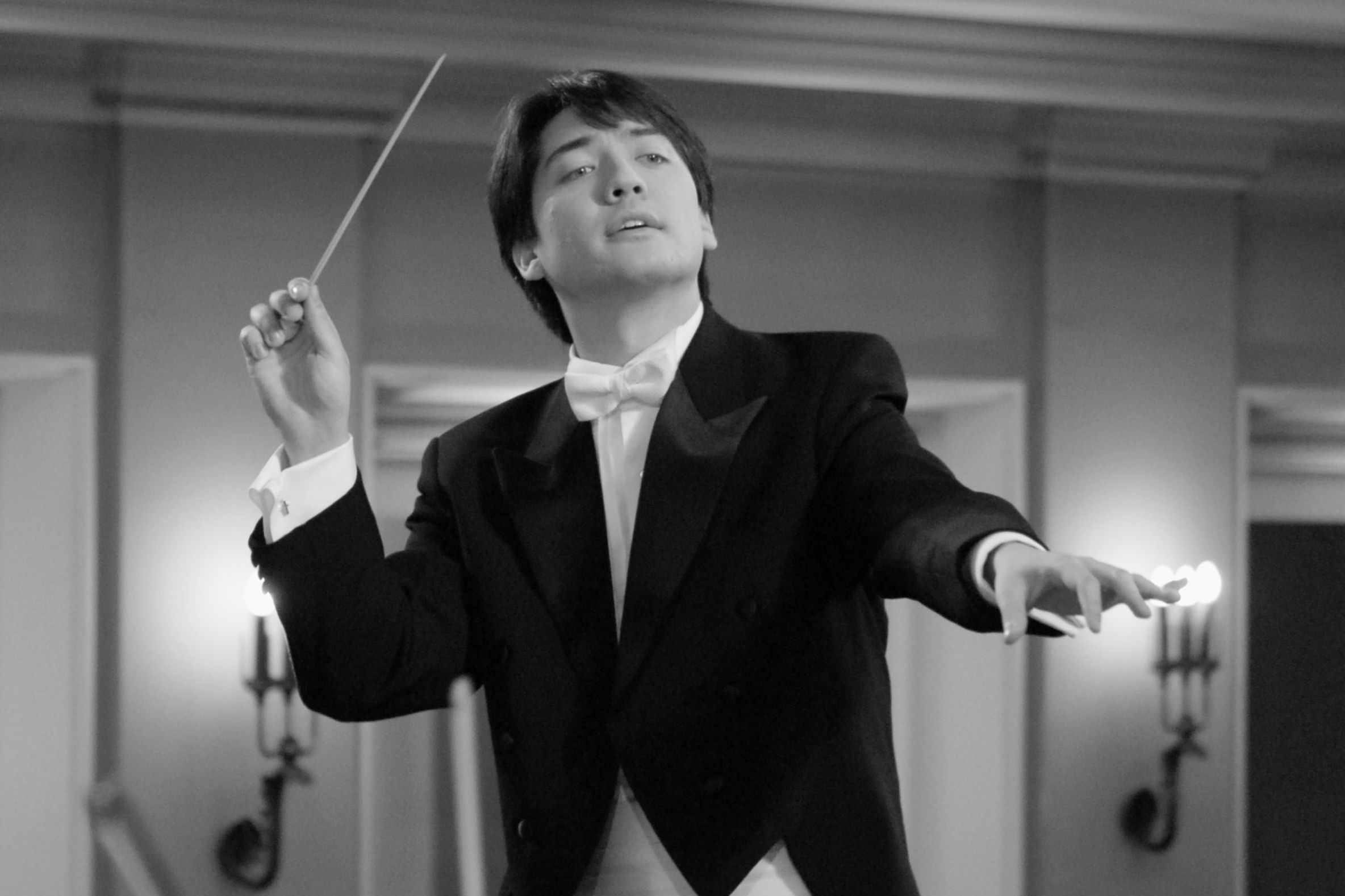
Eugene Tzigane, winner of the 8th edition of the competition

Top 3 prize winners since 1979
Year	1st	2nd	3rd
I: 1979	(East Germany) Claus Peter Flor	(Canada) Uri Mayer	(Poland) Tadeusz Marian Wojciechowski
II: 1983	(Japan) Chikara Imamura	(West Germany) Anton Zapf	(West Germany) Andreas Weiss
III: 1987	(West Germany) Michael Zilm	(France) Patrick Fournillier	(United States) Robert Ziegler
IV: 1991	(Japan) Makoto Suehiro	(United States) / (South Korea) Shin-ik Hahm (China) Jin Wang (tie)	(Austria) Christoph Campestrini
V: 1995	(Ukraine) Victoria Zhadko	(Japan) Hidehiro Shindori	(Germany) Achim Fiedler
VI: 1999	(Italy) Massimiliano Caldi	(Czech Republic) Tomáš Hanus	(United Kingdom) Stephen Ellery (Canada) Charles Olivieri-Munroe (tie)
VII: 2003	(Serbia) Aleksandar Marković (Lithuania) Modestas Pitrėnas (tie)	Not awarded	(Czech Republic) Marko Ivanović
VIII: 2007	(United States) Eugene Tzigane	(China) Chen Lin	(United States) Sean Newhouse
IX: 2012	(Australia) Daniel Smith	(Poland) Marzena Diakun	(Austria) Azis Sadikovic
X: 2017	(Taiwan) Su-Han Yang	(Israel) Bar Avni	(Lithuania) Modestas Barkauskas
XI: 2023	(China) Jong-Jie Yin	(Germany) Sergey Simakov	(Israel) Mikhail Mering

== Winners by country ==
Country	Number
Germany	2
Japan	2
Australia	1
China	1
Italy	1
Lithuania	1
Serbia	1
Taiwan	1
Ukraine	1
United States	1

== See also ==
- Music of Poland
- Chopin International Piano Competition
- Henryk Wieniawski Violin Competition
