= Symphony No. 1 (Prokofiev) =

1917 symphony by Sergei Prokofiev

- "Classical"
- by Sergei Prokofiev
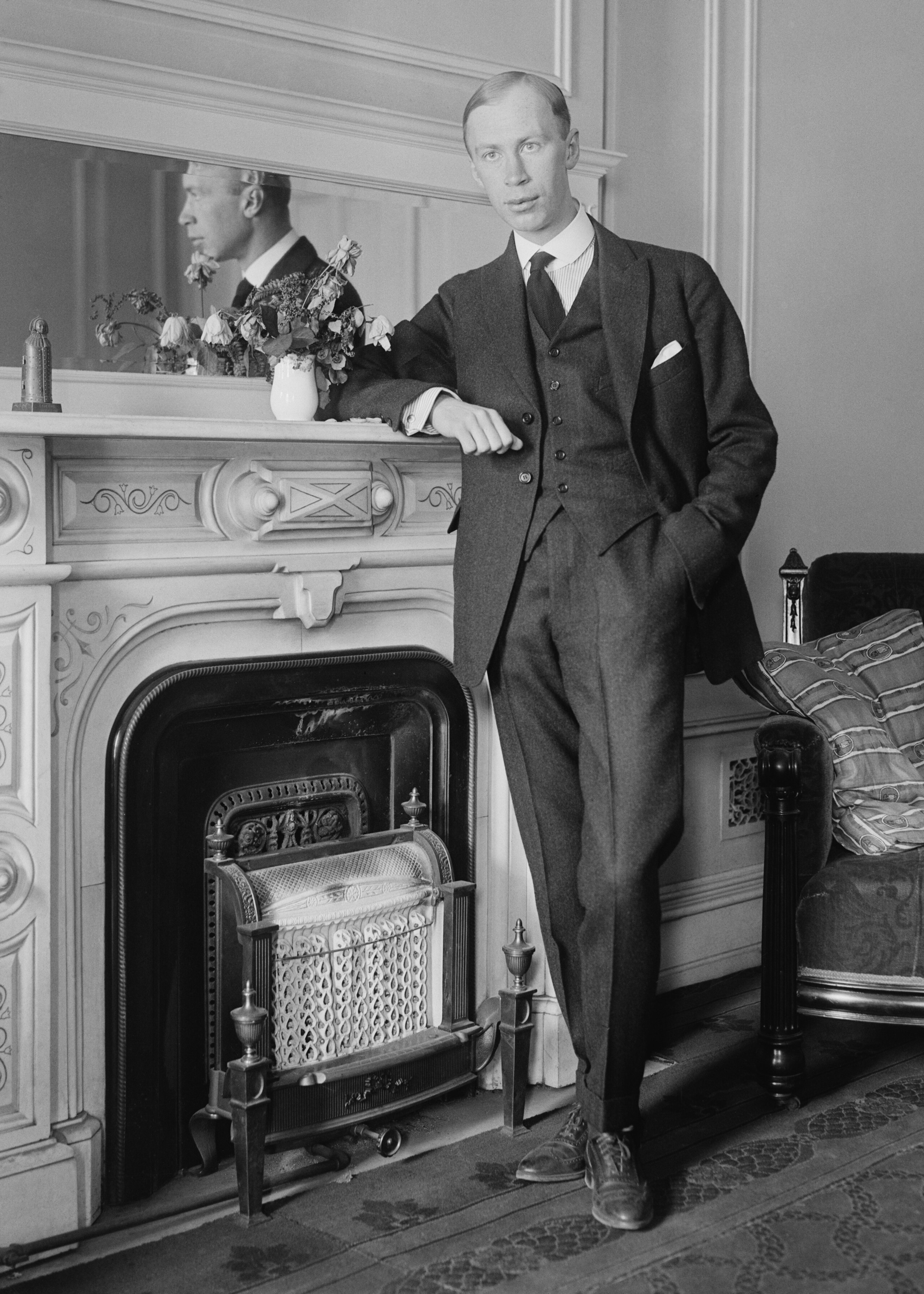
- Sergei Prokofiev, c. 1918
- Key: D major
- Opus: 25
- Composed: 1916–17
- Duration: 16 minutes
- Movements: Four

Premiere
- Date: April 18, 1918
- Location: Petrograd
- Conductor: Prokofiev

The Symphony No. 1 in D major, Op. 25, also known as the Classical, was Sergei Prokofiev's first numbered symphony. He began to compose it in 1916 and completed it on September 10, 1917. It was composed as a modern reinterpretation of the classical style of Joseph Haydn and Wolfgang Amadeus Mozart. The symphony's nickname was bestowed upon it by the composer. It premiered on April 18, 1918, in Petrograd, conducted by Prokofiev. It has remained one of his most popular works.

== Background ==
The symphony is composed in a style based on that of Haydn and Mozart, but does not follow them strictly. It has often been described as "neo-classical". The work was partly inspired by his conducting studies at the Saint Petersburg Conservatory, where the instructor, Nikolai Tcherepnin, taught his students about conducting Haydn, among other composers.

The influence of Mozart is apparent in the light, airy scoring and the fast paced bustle of the outer movements but it does deviate from this influence in some surprising ways. Prokofiev's own style is noticeable in the way the themes step upward or downward into the neighboring keys before returning to the first one. This is especially true of the second theme of the first movement and of the gavotte.

Prokofiev wrote the symphony on holiday in the country, using it as an exercise in composing away from the piano. This also served to get him away from the violent street fighting of the February Revolution which was then underway in Petrograd.

== Movements ==
External audio
- Performed by the Berlin Philharmonic under Herbert von Karajan
- I. Allegro
- II. Larghetto
- III. Gavotta (Non troppo allegro)
- IV. Finale (Vivace)

The symphony is in four movements and lasts about sixteen minutes:

1. Allegro (D major)
2. Larghetto (A major)
3. Gavotte: Non troppo allegro (D major)
4. Finale: Molto vivace (D major)

== History ==
On December 18, 1916, Prokofiev wrote in his diary, "I look forward with joyous anticipation to the Piano Concerto No. 3, the Violin Concerto, and the Classical Symphony." Six months later in May 1917, he took the "important decision" to compose without the aid of a piano. "For some time", he wrote, "I contemplated composing my Classical Symphony away from the piano, and all the work I had so far done on it I had done in my head. Now I resolved to finish it. It seemed to me that composing with or without a piano was purely a matter of habit, and it would be good to gain more experience with a work as uncomplicated as this symphony."

That same month, he continued in a later entry that he had sketched out the symphony but had yet to pen a final draft in orchestral score. His entry continued:

When our classically inclined musicians and professors (to my mind faux-classical) hear this symphony, they will be bound to scream in protest at this new example of Prokofiev's insolence, look how he will not let Mozart lie quiet in his grave but must come prodding at him with his grubby hands, contaminating the pure classical pearls with horrible Prokofievish dissonances. But my true friends will see that the style of my symphony is precisely Mozartian classicism and will value it accordingly, while the public will no doubt just be content to hear happy and uncomplicated music which it will, of course, applaud.

The following month, in June 1917, Prokofiev wrote in his diary that he had scrapped the original finale for the symphony, which he felt had seemed "too ponderous and not characterful enough" for a symphony in the classical style: "Asafyev put into my mind an idea he was developing, that there is no true joyfulness to be found in Russian music. Thinking about this, I composed a new finale, lively and blithe enough for there to be a complete absence of minor triads in the whole movement, only major ones. From my original finale I salvaged only the second subject... this kind of finale is quite appropriate to Mozartian style." By the end of summer 1917, Prokofiev wrote that he had finally embarked upon the orchestration of the symphony, but that work was moving slowly at first on account of his unfamiliarity with the music's style.

Originally, the Classical Symphony was intended to be premiered in Petrograd on November 4, 1917 with the Violin Concerto No. 1, but this was postponed. On January 18, 1918, Russia adopted the Gregorian calendar, bringing it into line with the Americas and Western Europe. This meant that Prokofiev's diary entry for April 5 was actually April 18 under the new calendar, which is now the date accepted as the premiere for the Classical Symphony. On April 18, Prokofiev wrote in his diary: "Rehearsal of the Classical Symphony with the State Orchestra, I conducted it myself, completely improvising, having forgotten the score and never indeed having studied it from a conducting perspective. I thought it might be a complete debacle, but nothing happened and in any case the parts has so many mistakes in them that the session turned mainly into one for making corrections. In Kislovodsk, I had worried that there would be some antagonism from a 'Revolutionary Orchestra' playing my new works, but the opposite was the case: the State Orchestra, infused with much new young blood, was flexible and attentive, and played the Symphony with evident enjoyment."

== Instrumentation ==
The symphony is scored for a Classical period-sized orchestra consisting of two flutes, two oboes, two clarinets, two bassoons, two horns, two trumpets, timpani, and strings.

== Recordings ==
Prokofiev recorded a piano arrangement of the "Gavotte" in 1935.

Complete recordings of this symphony include:

Orchestra	Conductor	Record company	Year	Format
Boston Symphony Orchestra	Serge Koussevitzky	RCA Victor	1929	CD
NBC Symphony Orchestra	Arturo Toscanini	RCA Victor	1951	CD
National Orchestra of the O.R.T.F.	Jean Martinon	Vox	1954	LP
Czech Philharmonic	Karel Ančerl	Supraphon	1956	CD
Philadelphia Orchestra	Eugene Ormandy	Sony Classical	1961	CD
Paris Conservatory Orchestra	Ernest Ansermet	London Records	1964	LP
Moscow Radio Symphony Orchestra	Gennadi Rozhdestvensky	Melodiya/Quintessence	1968	LP
New York Philharmonic	Leonard Bernstein	Columbia	1968	CD
London Symphony Orchestra	Walter Weller	Decca	1974	CD
London Symphony Orchestra	Vladimir Ashkenazy	Decca	1974	CD
Czech Philharmonic	Zdeněk Košler	Supraphon	1978	CD
London Symphony Orchestra	André Previn	EMI Classics	1978	CD
Berlin Philharmonic	Herbert von Karajan	Deutsche Grammophon	1981	CD
Chicago Symphony Orchestra	Sir Georg Solti	Decca	1982	CD
Scottish National Orchestra	Neeme Järvi	Chandos	1985	CD
Orchestre National de France	Lorin Maazel	CBS Masterworks	1985	CD
Los Angeles Philharmonic Orchestra	André Previn	Philips	1986	CD
Orpheus Chamber Orchestra	(none)	Deutsche Grammophon	1987	CD
Münchner Philharmoniker	Sergiu Celibidache	Warner Classics	1988	CD
Orchestre National de France	Mstislav Rostropovich	Erato	1988	CD
Berlin Philharmonic	Seiji Ozawa	Deutsche Grammophon	1989	CD
Slovak Philharmonic	Stephen Gunzenhauser	Naxos	1989	CD
Chamber Orchestra of Europe	Claudio Abbado	Deutsche Grammophon	1989	CD
Soviet State Orchestra	Nikolay Tiomkin	Discover the Classics	1990	CD
Philadelphia Orchestra	Riccardo Muti	Philips Classics Records	1990	CD
Sinfonia Varsovia	Krzysztof Penderecki	Aperto	1990	CD
London Symphony Orchestra	Michael Tilson Thomas	Sony Classical	1991	CD
Chicago Symphony Orchestra	James Levine	Deutsche Grammophon	1994	CD
St. Petersburg State Symphony Orchestra	Ravil Martynov	Sony	1994	CD
National Symphony Orchestra of Ukraine	Theodore Kuchar	Naxos	1995	CD
London Symphony Orchestra	Valery Gergiev	Philips	2004	CD
São Paulo State Symphony Orchestra	Marin Alsop	Naxos	2013	CD
USSR Ministry of Culture State Symphony Orchestra	Gennadi Rozhdestvensky			CD/LP
Bournemouth Symphony Orchestra	Kirill Karabits	Onyx Classics	2014	CD
Sinfonia Varsovia	Jerzy Maksymiuk	Warner Music Poland	2015	CD
Deutsches Symphonie-Orchester Berlin	Tugan Sokhiev	Sony Classics	2016	CD
Royal Scottish National Orchestra	Thomas Søndergård	Linn Records	2019	CD
London Symphony Orchestra	Gianandrea Noseda	LSO Live	2020	Download
