= Marzena Diakun =

Polish symphony orchestra conductor

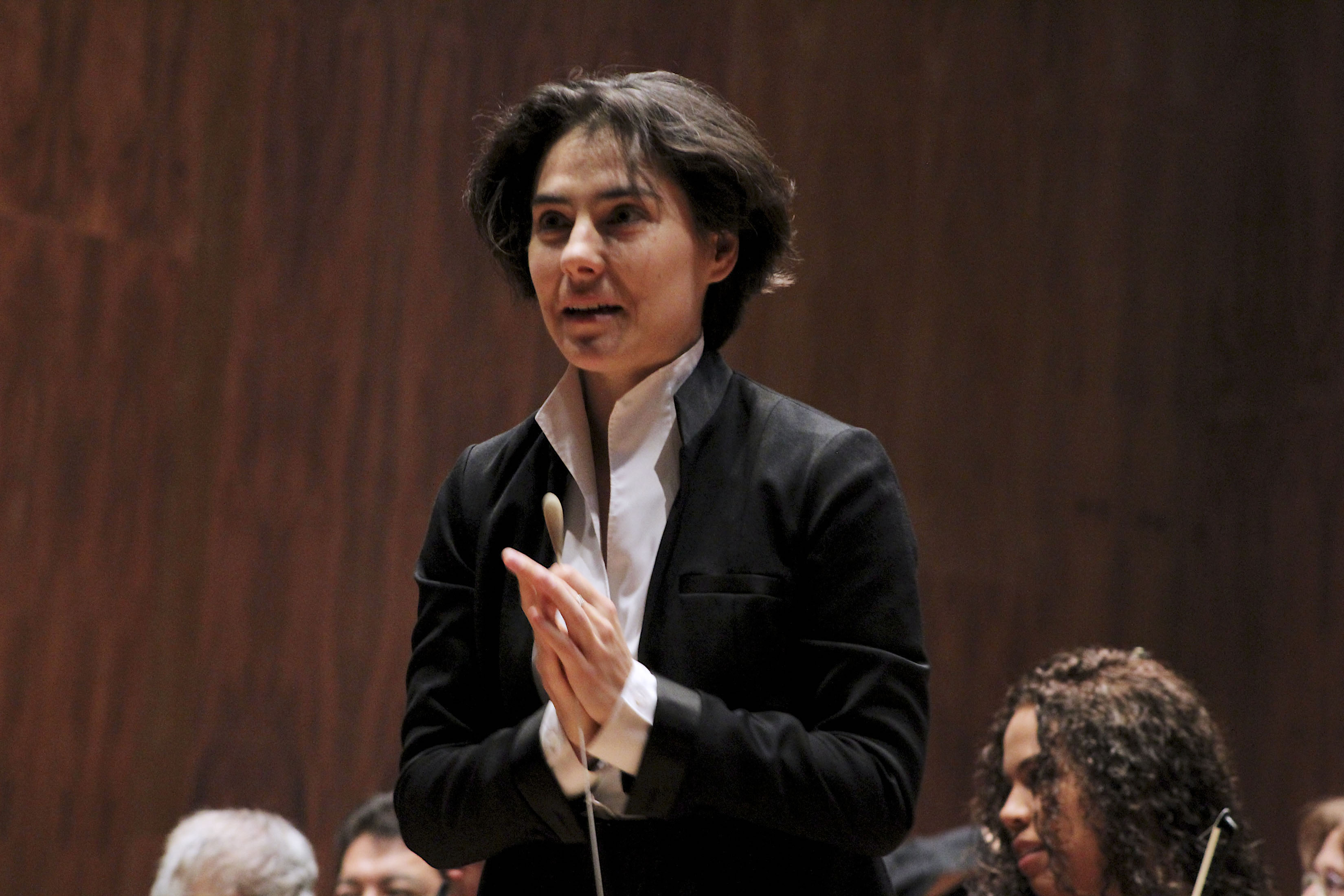

Background information
- Born: Marzena Diakun; April 3, 1981; Koszalin, Poland
- Genres: classical music
- Occupation: Conductor
- Website: diakun.com

Marzena Diakun (born 3 April 1981, Koszalin) is a Polish conductor.

== Biography ==
Born in 1981 in Koszalin in northern Poland, Diakun attended the Grażyna Bacewicz Music School in Koszalin. In 2005, she graduated with honours from the Karol Lipiński Academy of Music in Wrocław where she studied conducting. She made her conducting debut when she was still a student at the academy. She conducted at the 17th International Festival of Drum Music with the Koszalin Philharmonic. She then became an assistant of Jerzy Maksymiuk. In 2006, she continued her studies at the University of Music and Performing Arts in Vienna under Uroš Lajovic. Her conducting mentors have included Gabriel Chmura, Kurt Masur, Colin Metters, Howard Griffiths, David Zinman and Pierre Boulez. She worked as an assistant to Andrey Boreyko with the Bern Symphony Orchestra.

Between 2009 and 2012, Diakun headed the Spanish contemporary music band Smash Ensemble. In 2010, she obtained a doctoral degree from the Academy of Music in Kraków. Since 2011, she has worked as an assistant professor at the Karol Lipiński Academy of Music in Wrocław. In 2012, she won second prize at the Grzegorz Fitelberg International Competition for Conductors in Katowice. She also won second prize at the 59th Prague Spring Competition for Conductors in the Czech Republic. Between 2015 and 2017, she was an assistant to Mikko Franck, the principal conductor of the Orchestre philharmonique de Radio France. In 2015, she received a scholarship from the Boston Symphony Orchestra at the Tanglewood Music Festival. In 2016, she was awarded the Paszport Polityki Award in the category of classical music.

In September 2019, Diakun first guest-conducted the Staatsorchester Rheinische Philharmonie. From 2021 to 2024, Diakun was principal conductor and artistic director of the Community of Madrid Orchestra (Orquesta de la Comunidad de Madrid), the first female conductor to hold the post's in the orchestra's history. In March 2025, the Staatsorchester Rheinische Philharmonie announced the appointment of Diakun as its next chief conductor, the first female conductor ever named to the post, effective with the 2026-2027 season.

Cultural offices
| Preceded by Víctor Pablo Pérez | Principal Conductor, Orquesta de la Comunidad de Madrid; 2021–2024 | Succeeded by Alondra de la Parra |

== See also ==
- Music of Poland
