= International Competition of Young Conductors Lovro von Matačić =

The International Competition of Young Conductors Lovro von Matačić is being organized by the Lovro and Lilly Matačić Foundation every 4 years in Zagreb (Croatia) and is eligible to conductors under the age of 35.

== About the Competition ==
In 1995, on the 10th anniversary of maestro Lovro von Matačić's death, the first Lovro Matačić International Competition of Young Conductors was held. Since then, the event has been attracting the attention of the musical public every four years in autumn, bringing to Croatia's capital young conductors eager to find an incentive at the start of their careers. The candidates send audio and video recordings of their performances in the application.

In the previous four Competitions the candidates were evaluated by Milan Horvat, Valter Dešpalj, Kazushi Ono, Krešimir Šipuš, Klaus Arp, Pavle Dešpalj, Uroš Lajovic, Vladimir Krpan, Vjekoslav Šutej, Berislav Klobučar, Pascal Rophé, Gianpaolo Coral, Vladimir Benić, Zoran Juranić, Stanko Horvat, Nikša Bareza, Dmitri Kitayenko, Martin Sieghart, Simone Young, and many others. The importance of the award received from the Lovro von Matačić International Competition for Young Conductors is evident from the careers achieved by the winners of previous Competitions: although the first prize of 1995 was not awarded, the second prize winner Dmitri Liss is now the chief conductor of the Uralian Philharmonic Orchestra, and the associate conductor of the Russian National Orchestra. In 1999 he was also on the Jury of the Matačić Competition. On that occasions, Alan Buribayev of Kazakhstan won the Competition to become the chief conductor of the Irish National Radio Television Orchestra in Dublin in 2010/2011, and the leader of symphony orchestras of Norrkoping, Sweden and Brabant, Netherlands. Michal Dworzynski of Poland won the Competition in 2003. Dworzynski has so far conducted the BBC Symphony Orchestra and Philharmonic Orchestra, the London Philharmonics, London Symphony Orchestra, Ulster Orchestra, Israeli Philharmonic Orchestra, Dutch Radio Philharmonics, and many others. In June this year he is going to tour Australia and New Zealand. The winner of the last Competition in 2007 was Jimy Chiang Chi-Bun, born in Hong Kong, who has conducted the Vienna Radio Symphony Orchestra, staged G. Ligeti's Le Grand Macabre in Spain and in 2010 debuted with La Traviata at the Berlin Comic Opera. The second prize winner Eugene Tzigane has recently become the chief conductor of the Northwest German Philharmonic Opera, the guest conductor of the Pomeranian Philharmonics, and has also performed in the Bavarian State Opera. Special prize winner of the 2011 competition Maria Badstue from Denmark made her official debut with the Copenhagen Phil in 2013, and she has worked with the Gothenburg Symphony, South Denmark Phil, Helsingborg Symphony, Kristiansand Symphony, Odense Symphony, Aalborg Symphony, South Denmark Philharmonic, Orkester Norden a.o.

== History of the Competition ==
=== 1st International Competition of Young Conductors Lovro von Matačić, 1995 ===
- 1st prize wasn't awarded
- 2nd prize: Dmitry Liss (Russia)
- 3rd prize: Matthew Rowe (United Kingdom), Rolf Buijs (Netherlands)

=== 2nd International Competition of Young Conductors Lovro von Matačić, 1999 ===
- 1st prize: Alan Buribayev (Kazakhstan)
- 2nd prize: Karen Kamenšek (USA)
- 3rd prize: Janos Antal (Hungary)

=== 3rd International Competition of Young Conductors Lovro von Matačić, 2003 ===
- 1st prize: Michal Dworzyński (Poland)
- 2nd prize: Dian Čobanov (Bulgaria)
- 3rd prize: Jakub Hrůša (Czech Republic)

=== 4th International Competition of Young Conductors Lovro von Matačić, 2007 ===
- 1st prize: Jimmy Chiang Chi-Bun (United Kingdom)
- 2nd prize: Eugene Tzigane (USA)
- 3rd prize: Hikaru Ebihara (Japan)

=== 5th International Competition of Young Conductors Lovro von Matačić, 2011 ===
- 1st prize: Alexei Bogorad (Russia)
- 2nd prize: Kahchun Wong (Singapore)
- 3rd prize: Róbert Farkas (Hungary)

=== 6th International Competition of Young Conductors Lovro von Matačić, 2015 ===
- 1st prize: Gabriel Bebeselea (Romania)
- 2nd prize: Dean Whiteside (USA), So Awatsuji (Japan)
- 3rd prize:

=== 7th International Competition of Young Conductors Lovro von Matačić, 2019 ===
- 1st prize: Valentin Egel (Germany)
- 2nd prize: Toby Thatcher (Australia)
- 3rd prize: Junping Qian (China)

=== 8th International Competition of Young Conductors Lovro von Matačić, 2023 ===
- 1st prize: Niklas Benjamin Hoffmann (Germany)
- 2nd prize: Ka Hou Fan (Macao/Portugal)
- 3rd prize: Liao Brian (Taiwan)
