= Garry Walker =

Scottish conductor

- Born: 1974 (age 51–52)
- Known for: Orchestral conducting

Garry Walker (born 1974 in Edinburgh) is a Scottish conductor.

== Biography ==
Walker received his secondary school education at St Mary's Music School. His initial musical training was as a cellist, and he subsequently played cello in the Edinburgh Youth Orchestra. In 1995, Walker graduated from the Royal Northern College of Music and Manchester University.

In 1999, Walker won the Leeds Conductors Competition. He subsequently became associate conductor of the Royal Scottish National Orchestra (RSNO). He subsequently served as principal guest conductor of the RSNO from 2003 to 2007. Walker has also served as conductor of the Edinburgh Youth Orchestra, principal conductor of the Paragon Ensemble, and was a regular guest conductor of the Royal Philharmonic Orchestra. He has served on the faculty of the Royal Conservatoire of Scotland (RCS) as a visiting professor of conducting, and the RCS formally created the post of artistic director.

In November 2015, the Staatsorchester Rheinische Philharmonie announced the appointment of Walker as its chief conductor, effective with the 2017–2018 season. In June 2019, Opera North announced the appointment of Walker as its next music director, effective with the 2020–2021 season. In February 2020, the Staatsorchester Rheinische Philharmonie announced that Walker is to stand down as its chief conductor at the close of the 2021-2022 season. In September 2026, Opera North announced that Walker is to conclude his tenure as its music director in August 2028.

As one of his hobbies, Walker enjoys climbing mountains. He completed his goal to climb all 284 Munros.

Cultural offices
Preceded by Daniel Raiskin	Chief Conductor, Staatsorchester Rheinische Philharmonie; 2017–2022	Succeeded by Benjamin Shwartz
Preceded by Aleksandar Markovic	Music Director, Opera North; 2020–present	Succeeded by incumbent
