= Lovro von Matačić =

Croatian conductor and composer (1899–1985)

- Lovro von Matačić (photo with dedication)
- Occupations: conductor, composer

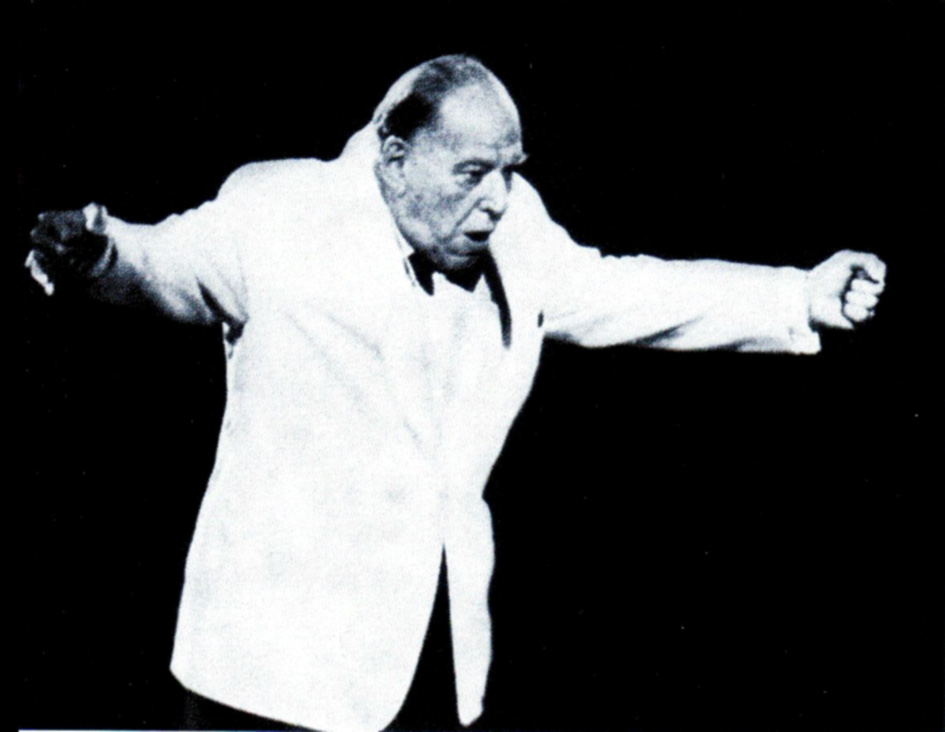
Lovro von Matačić

Lovro von Matačić (14 February 1899 – 4 January 1985) was a Croatian conductor and composer.

== Early life ==
Lovro von Matačić was born in Sušak to a family that was granted a noble title in the early 17th century. Growing up, he was always surrounded by music and art: his father had a career as an opera singer, and his mother as an actress. After his parents’ divorce, the family moved to Vienna, where Lovro joined the Vienna Boys Choir of the Royal Court Chapel at the age of eight. The Choir's repertoire must have influenced his later affinities, but most of all through the music of Anton Bruckner. In the Piarists’ Gymnasium in Vienna he received training in piano, organ and music theory. His music education continued under distinguished teachers at the Vienna Hochschule für Musik, which he never attended formally, and from which he did not obtain any degrees.

== After Vienna ==
Matačić proved his talent in practice when in 1916 he started volunteering as an accompanist at the Cologne Opera. When the war broke out, however, he volunteered for the army and also became an active revolutionary: in 1918 he joined the circle of left-oriented intellectuals in Vienna who recognized his artistic talent. He already had several works ready; he recited the poem Vigilia to his colleagues, and he was sixteen when the Tonkünstlerorchester of the Vienna Musikverein conducted by Bernhard Paumgartner premiered his Fantasy for the Orchestra.

Not many of Matačić's compositions have been completely preserved, although he did include some of them in his programs after becoming a distinguished conductor – such as the Confrontation Symphony or the Konjuh planina Cantata. After the war, he made a living mostly by playing in cafés, writing reviews, and by short-term conducting engagements in Osijek, Zagreb and Novi Sad, where he served the required military service as a military musician. Even then, his performances were marked with opera pieces and a vocal repertoire, but he did not find a permanent position until 1922 when he was employed by the Ljubljana Opera. In the meantime, he married Karla Dubska, a Czech singer who introduced him to the golden era of Czech music. His first success in Ljubljana was the performance of Leoš Janáček's opera Jenůfa, which would subsequently become one of the most often performed operas of Matačić's repertoire.

== Career as conductor ==
After Ljubljana, his engagements and successes lined up: with the Belgrade Opera and the Obilić Academic Choir, his first appearance in front of the Zagreb Philharmonic Orchestra (1927) and the Vienna Symphonic Orchestra at the Konzerthaus (1928), the Latvian National Opera in Riga, and the more permanent move to Zagreb in 1932 where he spread his activities to opera, symphony, and choir repertoire.

In 1936, Matačić conducted the Berlin Philharmonic and became the orchestra's regular guest. In 1938 he left the position of the permanent conductor at the Croatian National Theatre in Zagreb to become the director of the Belgrade Opera and the chief conductor of the Belgrade Philharmonic.

== World War II and aftermath ==
During World War II, Matačić spent most of the time in Zagreb as an army officer, but also continued conducting: he appeared in Zagreb with all major local orchestras, as well as in Vienna and Berlin. He was the Inspector of Croatian Army's music ensembles and was in charge of the entire corpus of military music in Croatia. His last concert before he was arrested was two weeks prior to the capitulation of Germany – on 23 April 1945 he appeared with the State Radio Orchestra. He always declined to comment in detail on his status during and after the war. In more than a year spent in prison, he was once again given a chance to work in music – he led the prison orchestra and choir. After his second wife Elizabeta Lilly Levenson, whom he married in 1933, managed to obtain a pardon for him, he relocated to Skopje in 1948.

== Career after the war ==
External audio
- You may hear Lovro von Matačić conducting Franz Lehar's opera The Merry Widow with the Philharmonia Orchestra and soloists: Elisabeth Schwarzkopf, Eberhard Waechter and Nicolai Gedda in 1963 Here on archive.org
- Lovro von Matačić conducting Nicolai Rimsky-Korsakov's Scheherazade, Op. 35, Symphonic Suite, with the Philharmonia Orchestra Here on archive.org

Until 1954, when he managed to get an approval from Tito to be issued a passport, his activities in the former country were limited to Rijeka and Ljubljana, but soon his career gained full international momentum. The recording in 1954 of highlights from Richard Strauss's Arabella (with Elisabeth Schwarzkopf) in London for the Columbia label marked a new beginning in the conductor's life. He replaced Herbert von Karajan for that recording and afterwards signed a five-year contract with the record company. The following year he replaced Karl Böhm at the Bavarian State Opera in Munich for a triumphal performance of Strauss's Ariadne on Naxos. Appearances in Berlin, Stuttgart, Augsburg, Salzburg, Graz and elsewhere followed, where he conducted concert programs, operas, and often even directed the productions. He was invited to the Dresden State Chapel, State Opera of East Berlin, and to tours around Europe, including Ljubljana, Split, and Dubrovnik.

After leaving Dresden in 1958, Matačić strengthened his ties to Vienna, debuted at the Bayreuth Festival where he also started a long-term collaboration with opera director and Richard Wagner's grandson, Wieland Wagner. He finally travelled to the United States, where he performed at the Chicago Opera. Matačić won over the Italian audience, too - in 1961 at the Rome Opera he performed Wagner's The Ring of the Nibelung. In 1961 in Frankfurt he became the chief conductor of the municipal opera and the prestigious series of Museum Concerts.

He continued working in multiple fields: he recorded for RAI in Turin, and simultaneously managed the Dubrovnik Summer Festival. He was named Honorary Life-Time Conductor of the NHK Symphony Orchestra in Japan, conducted orchestras such as Philharmonie, the Czech, Berlin, and Munich philharmonic orchestras. He appeared at the Bavarian State Opera, Teatro Colon in Buenos Aires, the State and Volksopera of Vienna. At the Musikverein he regularly conducted the Vienna Symphony Orchestra, sat on the jury for Karajan's conducting competition and in 1974 became the chief conductor of the National Opera Orchestra of Monte Carlo. The list goes on with his appointment as the chief conductor of the Zagreb Philharmonic Orchestra in 1970 with which he realized a number of ambitious plans, including support for young conductors through a special series – Presenting Young Conductors.

He died in Zagreb in 1985.

== Collaborations ==
The musicians he collaborated with include Sviatoslav Richter, Arthur Rubinstein, David Oistrakh, Christian Ferras, Rudolf Buchbinder, Marijana Radev, Ruža Pospiš Baldani, Elisabeth Schwarzkopf, Christa Ludwig, Renata Tebaldi, Birgit Nilsson, Leontyne Price, Nicolai Gedda, and Dietrich Fischer-Dieskau. He recorded for labels such as Columbia and Supraphon, covering a vast repertoire. Although Anton Bruckner was at the top of the list for his symphony and concert repertoire and Richard Wagner, along with his favorite Orpheus by Ch. W. Gluck and Janáček's Jenůfa at the top of his opera repertoire, Lovro von Matačić's interest covered a huge span from Palestrina, Monteverdi and Henry Purcell, through Handel, Mozart, Haydn and Beethoven to Mussorgsky, Mahler, Janáček, Smetana, R. Strauss, Wagner, Verdi and others.

He was especially dedicated to performing the work of Croatian composers. His first appearances with the Berlin Philharmonic Orchestra in 1936 already included a suite from Krešimir Baranović's ballet Gingerbread Heart and Jakov Gotovac's Symphonic Kolo. The programs of his subsequent international and Croatian performances also included the works of Josip Hatze, Blagoje Bersa, Božidar Širola, Božidar Kunc, Boris Papandopulo, Antun Dobronić and Josip Štolcer-Slavenski, Bruno Bjelinski. Matačić once said: “One day, when they draw a line, it will not matter what I did for international composers, but how I contributed to Croatian music. His numerous efforts in that respect should definitely include his last will and testimony by which he established the Lovro & Lilly Matačić Foundation.

== Awards and acknowledgements ==
For his anthological interpretations (especially of works by Bruckner and Wagner and of major works of the Slavic repertoire) he was awarded the Bruckner Medal of the International Bruckner Society, Bruckner Ring of the Vienna Symphony Orchestra, Janáček and Smetana Medals of the Czechoslovak Government, Cross of the 1st Order for Arts and Sciences of the President of the Republic of Austria, Hans von Bülow Medal of the Berlin Philharmonic as well as many other awards.

== Composer ==
Matačić was also active as a composer. His most significant composition is his Symphony of Confrontations („Symphonie der Konfrontationen“, 1979, revised 1984), an hour-long work in four movements for two pianos, large string orchestra and enormous percussion sections. It deals with the threat of destruction by nuclear weapons in a harsh musical language that includes quotes from the "Dies Irae" Theme from Hector Berlioz' Symphonie Fantastique.

== Legacy ==
The International Lovro von Matačić Competition is held every four years in Zagreb. Notable past prize winners include Eugene Tzigane and Jakub Hrůša.

The "Lovro Matačić Lifetime Achievement Award" is awarded biannually by the Croatian Association of Musical Artists.

== See also ==
- Lovro and Lilly Matačić Foundation
- International Competition of Young Conductors Lovro von Matačić

Cultural offices
| Preceded by Franz Konwitschny | Kapellmeister and Chief Conductor, Staatskapelle Dresden; 1956–1958 | Succeeded by Otmar Suitner |
| Preceded by Georg Solti | General Music Director and Chief Intendant, Frankfurt Opera; 1961–1966 | Succeeded by Christoph von Dohnányi |
