= Victoria Zhadko =

Ukrainian conductor and guitarist (born 1967)

Victoria Anatolyevna Zhadko (Ukrainian: Жадько Вікторія Анатоліївна, born 23 August 1967 in Kiev) is a Ukrainian conductor, guitarist and teacher. She was awarded the status of Artist of Ukraine in 1994. She is a laureate of multiple international conducting competitions: the Prokofiev International Music Competition (1993, Saint Petersburg, first prize), the Arturo Toscanini International Conducting Competition in Parma (Italy, 1993), the Stefan Turchak conductor's competition (1994, Kiev, first prize), the III. International Kirill Kondrashin Competition for conductors in Amsterdam (The Netherlands, 1994), the XI and XII Malko Competitions in Copenhagen (Denmark, 1995, 1999), and the V. Grzegorz Fitelberg International Competition for Conductors in Katowice (Poland, 1995, first prize). She is an honoured artist of Ukraine (1995).

== Biography ==
Victoria Anatolyevna Zhadko was born in Kiev on 23 August 1967. In 1986 she graduated from the Voroshilovgrad Music Academy (now Luhansk) in the class of M. A. Petukh. In 1991 she graduated from the Kiev Conservatory in the guitar class of M. A. Davydov, and in 1993 in the class for symphony conducting by A. Vlasenko. After graduating, she worked as chief conductor of the Kharkov Philharmonic Symphony Orchestra from 1997 to 2000. On the stage of the Kharkov Opera and Ballet Theatre with the staff of the Children's Ballet Theatre-Studio of Kharkov, she staged 2 ballets – Eupraxia of A. Kanerstein and The Nutcracker by Tchaikovsky.

She has been an assistant professor since 1996 and has been a professor of guitar and symphony conducting at the Cultural Institute Kiev since 1997. She founded the first Department of Early Music and Chamber Music in Ukraine at the Kiev Cultural Institute.

Victoria Zhadko has worked with the leading symphony ensembles of Ukraine, including the National Symphony Orchestra of Ukraine, the Orchestra of the National Opera of Ukraine, and the Symphony Orchestras of Odessa, Lugansk, and Lviv.

As a guitarist and conductor, she has toured Russia, Poland, Denmark, the Netherlands, Belgium, Finland, Germany, France, Hungary and Great Britain. Since 1989 she has made numerous recordings on Ukrainian television and radio, and since 1993 she has been a conductor of the Ukrainian Radio Symphony Orchestra.

Victoria Zhadko is author of a university program in the field of classical guitar. She has organised master classes and advanced training courses for guitar teachers in basic and secondary education institutions of Ukraine. Her students include winners of numerous regional and international competitions and festivals.

== Bibliography ==
- Victoria Zhadko: "My goal is not to become a star, but a professional", Ukraine, 1994, No. 4

== Sources ==
- Melnik O.: Диригент — не жіноча професія? // Музика ("Conductor – not a female profession?", Music), 1993, No. 5
- Kazanskaya L.: Конкурс имени Сергея Прокофьева //Муз. жизнь ("Competition named after Sergei Prokofiev", Musical Life), 1993, No. 9–10
- [B. a]. С именами Рахманинова и Прокофьева // Культура (With the names of Rachmaninoff and Prokofiev, Culture), 13 February 1993
- Kolotilenko T.: Браво, Вікторіє! //ЮЖ ("Bravo, Victoria!", Yuzh), 22 May 1993
- Semenenko N.: Вікторія — завжди перемога у/Там само ("Victoria – always a victory", Yuzh), 1996, No. 10
