= Tadeusz Strugała =

Polish conductor (born 1935)

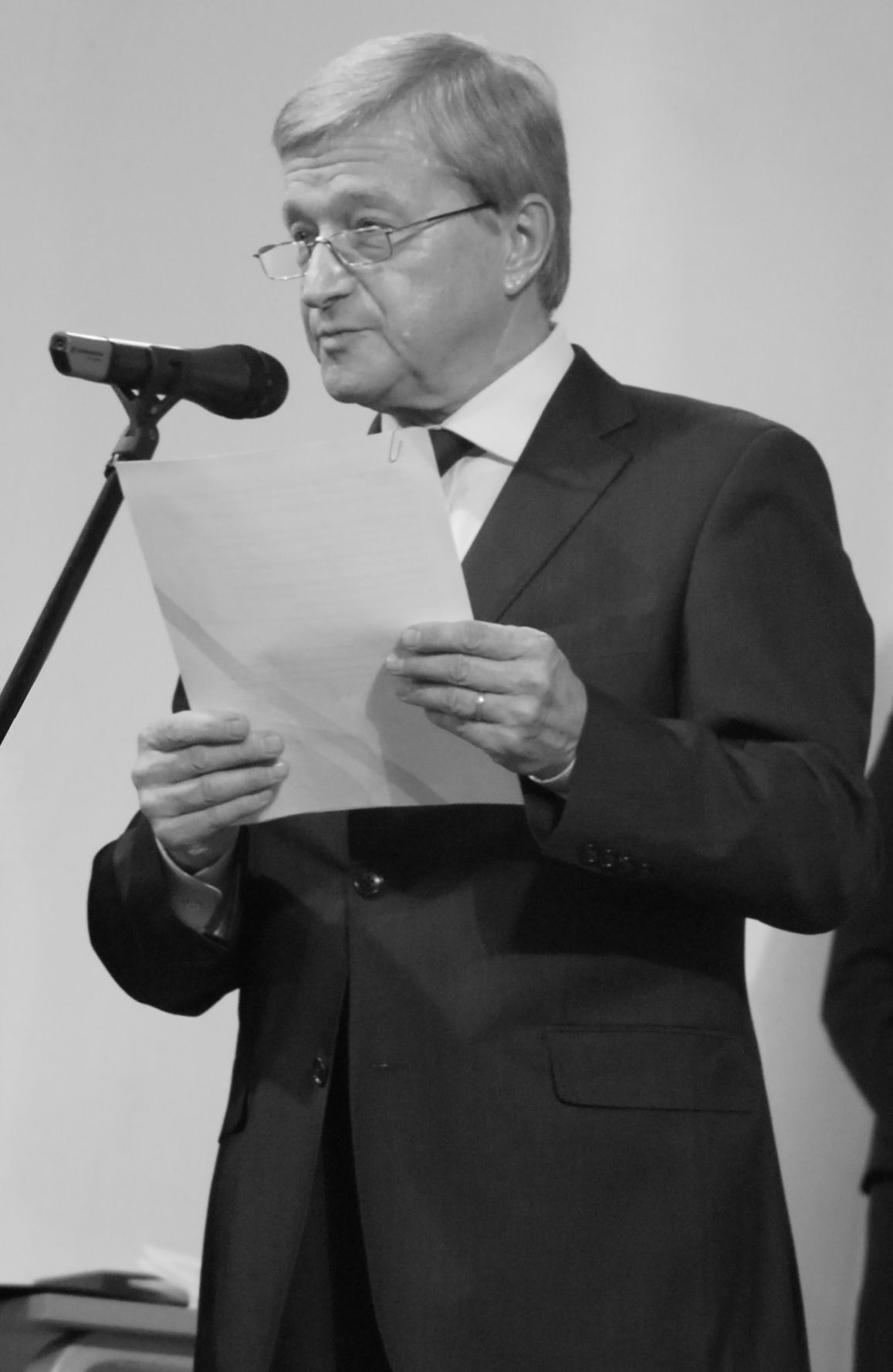
Strugała as chairman of the competition jury during the 8th Grzegorz Fitelberg International Competition for Conductors at the Silesian Philharmonic in Katowice in 2007

Tadeusz Strugała (born 10 February 1935) is a Polish conductor.

== Early life and education ==
Strugała was born on 10 February 1935 in Katowice. He studied Composition and Conducting under Adam Kopyciński of the Faculty of Music Theory, at the Academy of Music in Wrocław.

== Career ==
He has had the following succession of conducting positions:

- 1969–1980 director of the Wrocław Philharmonic,
- 1975–1976 director of the National Polish Radio Symphony Orchestra in Katowice;
- 1977–1979 principal conductor and 1984–1986 guest conductor of the Presidential Symphony Orchestra in Ankara (Turkey);
- 1979–1990 deputy artistic director and non-primary conductor of the National Philharmonic in Warsaw;
- 1981–1986 director of the Krakow Philharmonic orchestra;
- 1990–1993 artistic director and principal conductor of the Polish Radio Symphony Orchestra in Warsaw;
- 1994–2001 guest conductor of the Prague Symphony Orchestra (Czech Republic);
- since 1998, conductor-in-residence of the Chopin Festival in Gaming (Austria).

He has regularly sat as a juror in conducting competitions, including as the chair of the Grzegorz Fitelberg International Competition for Conductors in 2003 and 2007.

He has been professor of conducting and composition at the Kraków Music Academy. He has also been the Minister of Culture Representative to the Programme Board of the National Radio Symphony Orchestra in Katowice.

== Honours ==
In 2023, he received the Golden Fryderyk – an award for lifetime artistic achievements.

Preceded by Zygmunt Tlatlik	Music Director, Polish National Radio Symphony Orchestra; 1975–1976	Succeeded by Jerzy Maksymiuk
Preceded by Jerzy Katlewicz	Music Director, Kraków Philharmonic Orchestra; 1981–1986	Succeeded by Gilbert Levine
