= Rudolf Baumgartner =

Swiss conductor and violinist (1917–2002)

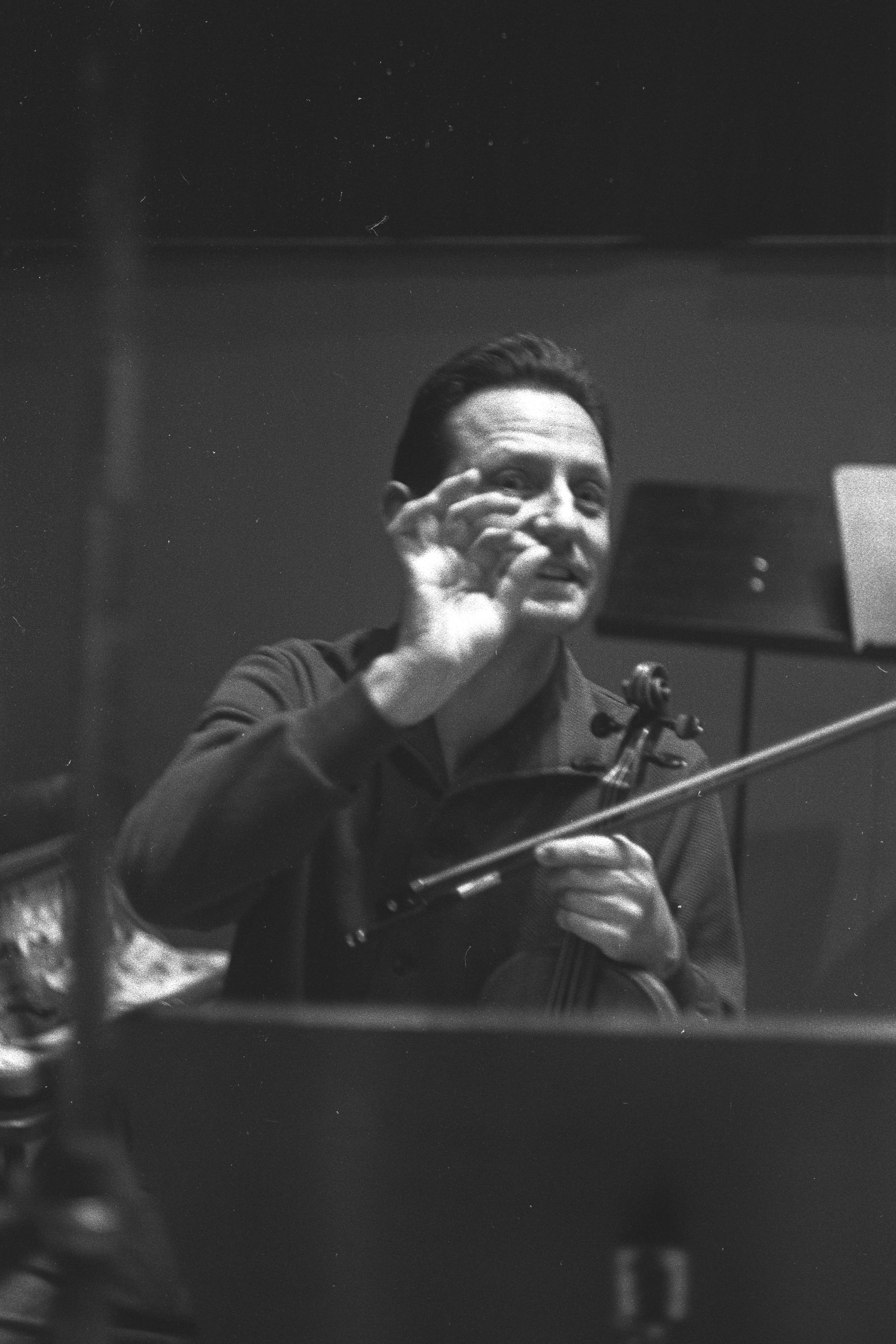
Rudolf Baumgartner (1956)

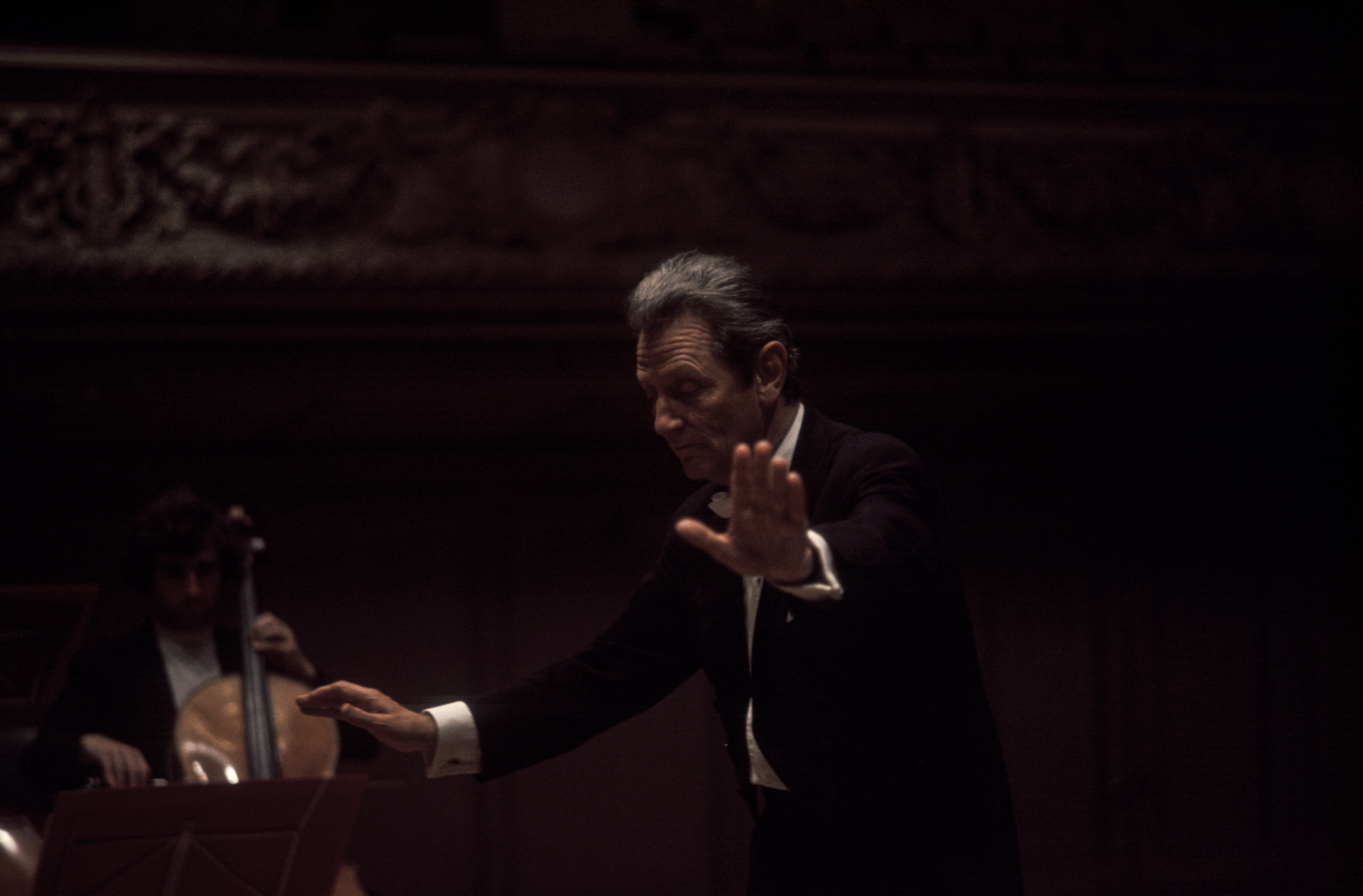
Rudolf Baumgartner (1984)

Rudolf Baumgartner (14 September 1917 – 22 March 2002) was a Swiss conductor, violinist and music educator. In 1956 he founded the Lucerne Festival Strings chamber orchestra together with Wolfgang Schneiderhan.

== Life and career ==
Born in Zurich, Switzerland, Baumgartner earned degrees in music from the University of Zurich and the Zurich Conservatory. At the latter institution he was a pupil of Stefi Geyer and Paul Müller-Zürich. After completing these studies, he pursued further violin training privately with Carl Flesch in Paris and Wolfgang Schneiderhan in Vienna. He later co-founded the Lucerne Festival Strings with Schneiderhan in 1956.

In the 1950s Baumgartner recorded the complete sonatas for violin and harpsichord of J. S. Bach with the Austrian harpsichordist Isolde Ahlgrimm for Phillips, although the masters have been lost. In 1954 he joined the faculty of the Lucerne Conservatory as a professor of violin, and later became the director of that institution in 1960. From 1969 through 1980 he was also artistic director of the Lucerne Festival.

Baumgartner died in Siena, Italy, on 22 March 2002.
