= Orquesta Filarmónica de Jalisco =

Orchestra based in Guadalajara, Mexico

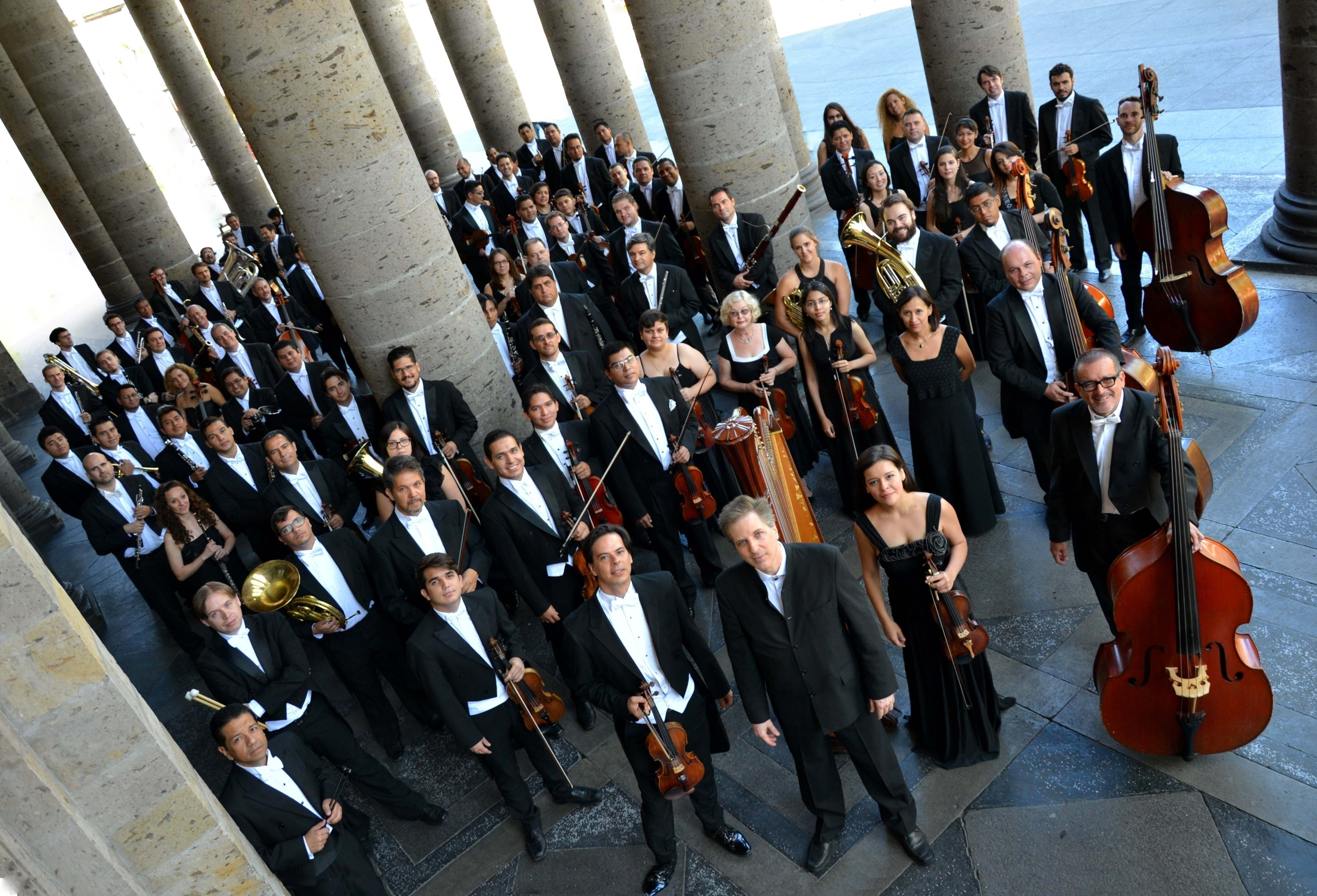
The Orquesta Filarmónica de Jalisco at its headquarters on the Teatro Degollado de Guadalajara, Jalisco, México.

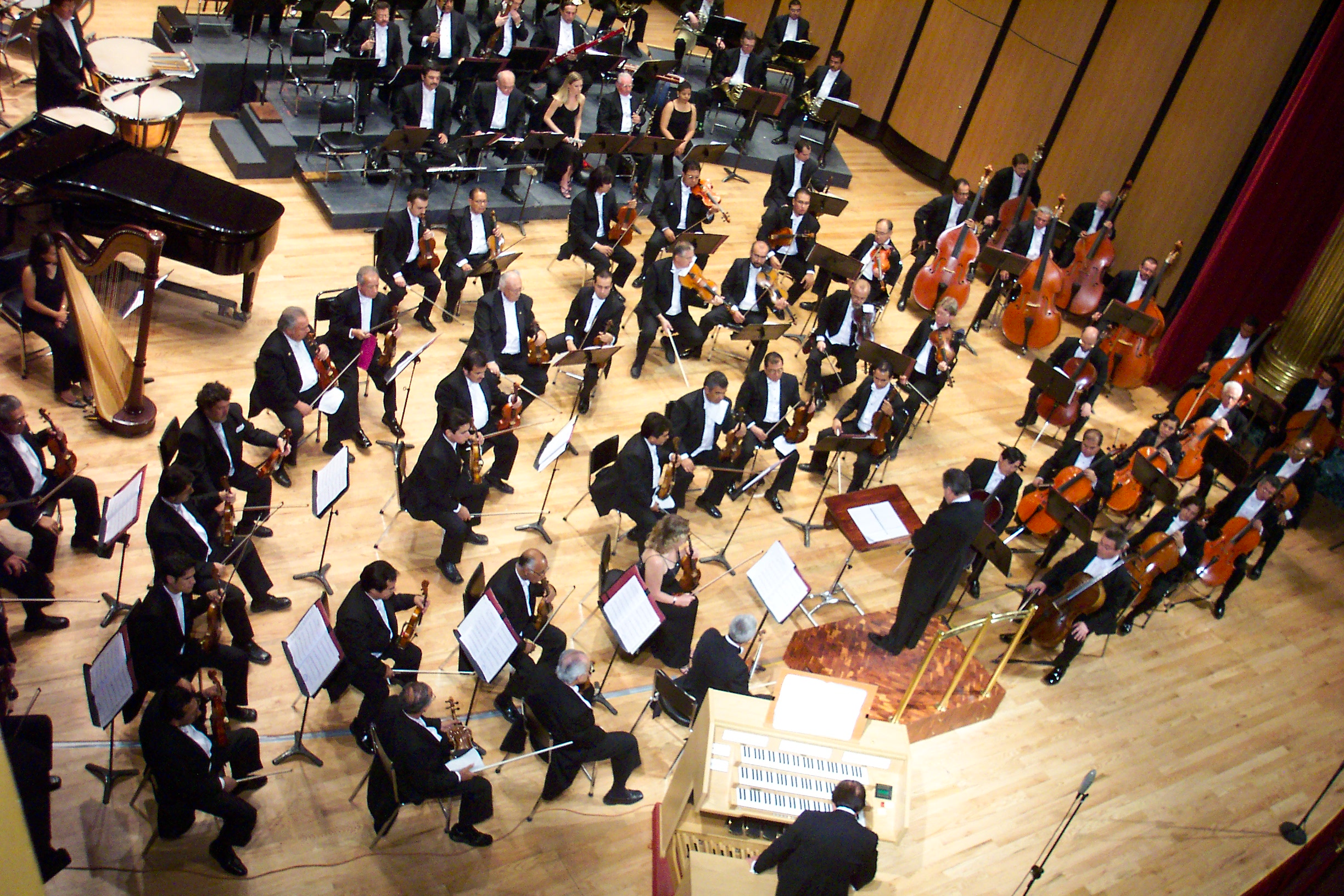
Orquesta filarmonica de jalisco

The Jalisco Philharmonic Orchestra (Spanish: Orquesta Filarmónica de Jalisco) is a Mexican orchestra. It was established in 1912 by José Rolón as the Guadalajara Symphonic Orchestra in Guadalajara, Jalisco in Mexico. The Orchestra resides at Teatro Degollado located in the historic district of Guadalajara.

It has been conducted by Enrique Bátiz, Neeme Järvi, Plácido Domingo, Mu-Hai Tang, Claudio Abbado, Antal Doráti, Eduardo Mata and Charles Dutoit. Alondra de la Parra was the artistic director from 2012 to 2013. Jesús Medina debuted as the orchestra's music director in February of 2019.

== Musical directors ==
Musical directors of the orchestra:

- Amador Juárez (1919-1923)
- José Trinidad Tovar (1923-1939)
- Leslie Hodge (1945-1950)
- Abel Eisenberg (1951-1956)
- Helmut Goldman (1957-1964)
- Eduardo Mata (1965-1966)
- Kenneth Klein (1967-1978)
- Hugo Jan Huss (1979-1981)
- Francisco Orozco (1982-1986)
- José Guadalupe Flores (1986-1987)
- Manuel de Elías (1987-1990)
- José Guadalupe Flores (1990-1996)
- Guillermo Salvador (1997-2002)
- Luis Herrera de la Fuente (2002-2003)
- Héctor Guzmán (2004-2010)
- Alondra de la Parra (2012-2013)
- Marco Parisotto (2014-2018)
- Jesús Medina Villarreal (2019-2021)
- José Luis Castillo (2022-date)
