= Opera North =

Opera company based in Leeds, England

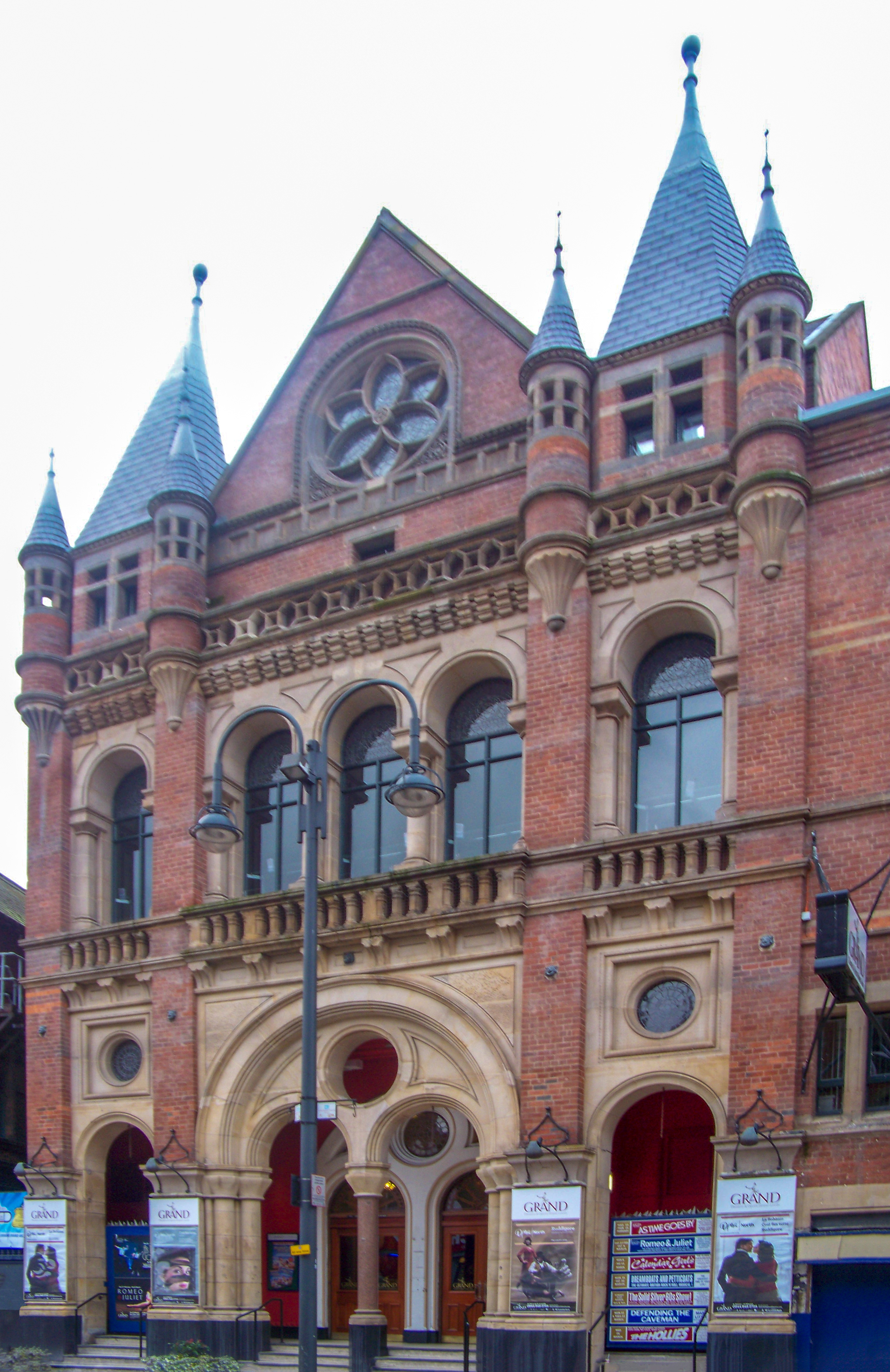
The Grand Theatre, Leeds, home of Opera North

Opera North is an English opera company based in Leeds. The company's home theatre is the Leeds Grand Theatre. The company also presents regular seasons in several other cities, at the Theatre Royal, Nottingham, the Lowry Centre, Salford Quays and the Theatre Royal, Newcastle. The company's orchestra, the Orchestra of Opera North, regularly performs and records in its own right. Operas are performed either in English translation or in the original language of the libretto, in the latter case usually with surtitles.

The major funders of Opera North include Arts Council England and, in Yorkshire, Leeds City Council, West Yorkshire Grants, North Yorkshire County Council, and East Riding of Yorkshire Council.

== History ==
Opera North was established in 1977 as English National Opera North, as an offshoot of English National Opera, with the specific intention of delivering professional-level opera to the northern areas of England which, up to that point, had had no permanently established opera company. The company gave its first performance, of Saint-Saëns's Samson and Delilah, on 15 November 1978. The founding music director of the company was David Lloyd-Jones, who held the post until 1990. In 1981, the company's name was changed to Opera North, and the official ties with English National Opera ceased to exist.

Paul Daniel became the company's second music director, serving in the post from 1990 to 1997. With general administrators Nicholas Payne and, later, Ian Ritchie and Richard Mantle, the company continued to bring operatic novelties, as well as a wide selection of familiar works, to its audience in the North of England and further afield. Following Daniel's departure, Elgar Howarth held the temporary post of music advisor, until Steven Sloane became music director in 1999.

Richard Farnes became music director in 2004. Achievements during his tenure included the company's first staging of Wagner's Der Ring des Nibelungen, over a span of 4 years. Farnes stood down as music director after the 2015–2016 season.

In October 2015, Aleksandar Marković made his first appearance as guest conductor with the company. In February 2016, the company announced the appointment of Marković as its next music director, effective with the 2016–2017 season. His first production as music director of the company was in September 2016, with Der Rosenkavalier. On 18 April 2017, Opera North announced that Marković had resigned as the company's music director, with his contract formally to terminate in July 2017, but where he is not to appear with the company for the remainder of the 2016–2017 season.

In June 2019, Opera North announced the appointments of Garry Walker as its next music director, and of Antony Hermus as its new principal guest conductor. Walker became music director effective with the 2020–2021 season. In September 2026, the company announced simultaneously the scheduled conclusion of Walker's tenure as its music director at the close of the 2027–2028 season, and the appointment of Patrick Lange as its next music director, effective with the 2028–2029 season.

In October 2021, Opera North relocated their headquarters to the Howard Opera Centre, following an £18 million redevelopment.

Past general directors of Opera North have included Sir Richard Mantle, who held the post since 1994 and retired in December 2023. He is succeeded by Opera North's current general director and CEO, Laura Canning. the first woman named to the post, effective December 2023.

== Characteristics of the company ==
=== Repertory ===
As well as presenting core standard repertory, the company has performed operas that are rarely seen in Britain. Examples include:

- Les mamelles de Tirésias (Poulenc) (1978)
- The Mines of Sulphur (Richard Rodney Bennett) (1980)
- A Village Romeo and Juliet (Delius) (1980)
- Prince Igor (Alexander Borodin) (1982)
- Beatrice and Benedict (Berlioz) (1983)
- Johnny Strikes Up (Krenek) (1984, British première)
- Intermezzo (Richard Strauss) (1986)
- Daphne (Strauss) (1987, British première)
- La finta giardiniera (Mozart) (1989)
- Jérusalem (Verdi) (1990, British première)
- Ariane and Bluebeard (Dukas) (1990)
- Masquerade (Carl Nielsen) (1990, British professional première)
- King Priam (Michael Tippett) (1991)
- L'étoile (Chabrier) (1991)
- The Jewel Box (Mozart, arranged by Paul Griffiths) (1991)
- The Thieving Magpie (Rossini) (1992)
- Iolanta (Tchaikovsky) (1992)
- The Duenna (Roberto Gerhard) (1992, British première)
- Der ferne Klang (Schreker) (1992, British première)
- La Gioconda (Ponchielli) (1993)
- Gloriana (Britten) (1993)
- Il re pastore (Mozart) (1993)
- The Secret Marriage (Cimarosa) (1993)
- Oberto (Verdi) (1994, British stage première)
- The Reluctant King (Chabrier) (1994, British stage première)
- Troilus and Cressida (William Walton) (1995)
- Hamlet (Ambroise Thomas) (1995)
- Medea (Cherubini) (1996)
- Julietta (Martinů) (1997)
- Joan of Arc (Verdi) (1998)
- Radamisto (Handel) (2000)
- Genoveva (Schumann) (2000)
- Paradise Moscow (Shostakovich) (2001)
- Francesca da Rimini (Rachmaninov) (2004)
- Love's Luggage Lost (Rossini) (2004, British stage première)
- Djamileh (Bizet) (2004)
- La vida breve (Manuel de Falla) (2004)
- La voix humaine (Poulenc) (2006)
- The Fortunes of King Croesus (Reinhard Keiser) (2007, British première)
- The Excursions of Mr Broucek (Janáček) (2009)
- The Snow Maiden (Rimsky-Korsakov) (2017)
- Trouble in Tahiti (Leonard Bernstein) (2017)
- The Greek Passion (Martinů) (2019)

In 2011, the company performed The Portrait by Mieczysław Weinberg and initiated an annual series of semi-staged concert performances of the four operas in Wagner's Der Ring des Nibelungen by performing Das Rheingold in Leeds Town Hall. Beached, a community opera by composer Harvey Brough with a libretto by Lee Hall co-commissioned by Opera North and the sea-side resort of Bridlington premiered on 15 July 2011.

At the request of the Bridlington primary school whose 300 children performed in the opera, the company asked for the removal of an explicit reference to a gay character's sexuality from one of the scenes. Hall initially refused, and the opera was withdrawn. However, following negotiations the matter was resolved when the character's contentious line "Of course I'm queer" was changed to "Of course I'm gay".

=== World premieres ===
Opera North has given world premières of the following operas: Rebecca by Wilfred Josephs (1983), Caritas by Robert Saxton (1991), Baa, Baa, Black Sheep by Michael Berkeley (1993), Playing Away by Benedict Mason (1994), The Nightingale's to Blame by Simon Holt (1998), Jonathan Dove's The Adventures of Pinocchio (2007) and Swanhunter (2009), and Skin Deep by David Sawer and Armando Iannucci (2009). In July 2009, Opera North premièred Prima Donna, a new opera by Rufus Wainwright, at the Manchester International Festival.

=== Musical theatre ===
Opera North has also given performances of musical theatre works. The first was Jerome Kern's Show Boat (in collaboration with the Royal Shakespeare Company) in 1989, and productions of Gershwin's Of Thee I Sing and Sondheim's Sweeney Todd followed in 1998. A joint production with West Yorkshire Playhouse of Sondheim's Into the Woods was staged in Leeds in 2016. Latterly, the works of Kurt Weill have become something of a speciality, with productions of Love Life (1996), One Touch of Venus and The Seven Deadly Sins in 2004, Arms and the Cow in 2006, and Street Scene in 2020. In 2009, Let 'Em Eat Cake, the sequel to Of Thee I Sing, was produced, and in 2012 Rodgers and Hammerstein's Carousel was performed in Leeds, Salford and London. It was revived in 2015, playing in Leeds before touring to Norwich, Edinburgh and Dublin.

=== Electronic music ===
Opera North has worked extensively with electronic composer Mira Calix, commissioning Dead Wedding (for the Manchester International Festival 2007) Onibus (2008) and the installation Chorus (2009) for the opening of the Howard Assembly Room with visual artist UVA.

== Awards ==
- Winner of the Outstanding Achievement in Opera Award at the 2022 Critics' Circle Music Awards for Orpheus, Music by Claudio Monteverdi and Jasdeep Singh Degun (co-music directors Laurence Cummings and Jasdeep Singh Degun). The production also went on to win the Achievement in Opera Award in the 2023 UK Theatre Awards and Best Stage Production in the 2023 Asian Media Awards.
- Winner of the South Bank Sky Arts Award for Rigoletto 2022 (music director; Garry Walker, stage director Femi Elufowoju Jr.)
- Winner of the TMA Theatre Award for Outstanding Achievement in Opera 2007 (for Peter Grimes, directed by Phyllida Lloyd), and in 2004
- Winner of the Royal Philharmonic Society Award for Opera & Music Theatre 2007 (for Peter Grimes) and in 2005
- Winner of the South Bank Show Award for Opera 2007 (for Peter Grimes) and 2005 (for its Eight Little Greats season of one-act operas)
- Winner of the Manchester Evening News Theatre Awards for Opera 2004
- Winner of the Audiences Yorkshire Award for Best Overall Marketing and Audience Development Campaign 2004

== Music directors ==
- David Lloyd-Jones (1978–1990)
- Paul Daniel (1990–1997)
- Steven Sloane (1999–2002)
- Richard Farnes (2004–2016)
- Aleksandar Markovic (2016–2017)
- Garry Walker (2020–present)
