= Lucerne Festival Strings =

The Lucerne Festival Strings is one of Switzerland's most frequently touring chamber orchestras, which for decades was closely associated with the Lucerne School of Music, being for many years an "ensemble in residence".

== History ==
The orchestra was founded in 1956 by Wolfgang Schneiderhan and Rudolf Baumgartner as part of the Lucerne International Music Festival (today: Lucerne Festival); the latter directed it until 1998. His successor as artistic director was Achim Fiedler who held the position from 1998 to summer 2012.The Australian-Swiss violinist Daniel Dodds has been artistic director since the 2012/2013 season. Managing Director is Hans-Christoph Mauruschat. In recent years, the CD label Sony Classical and Oehms Classics have released CD recordings of the ensemble.

The Festival Strings Lucerne began in the first year of their existence to acquire an excellent international reputation with recordings for Deutsche Grammophon, with which they had an exclusive contract till 1973. From the late 1950s onwards, the Lucerne Festival Strings were among the pioneers of Deutsche Grammophon's Archiv series, which at the time made record history with the first publication of works by forgotten or hardly known composers, especially from the Baroque period, such as Giuseppe Tartini (1959).
