= Wolfgang Schneiderhan (violinist) =

Austrian classical violinist (1915–2002)

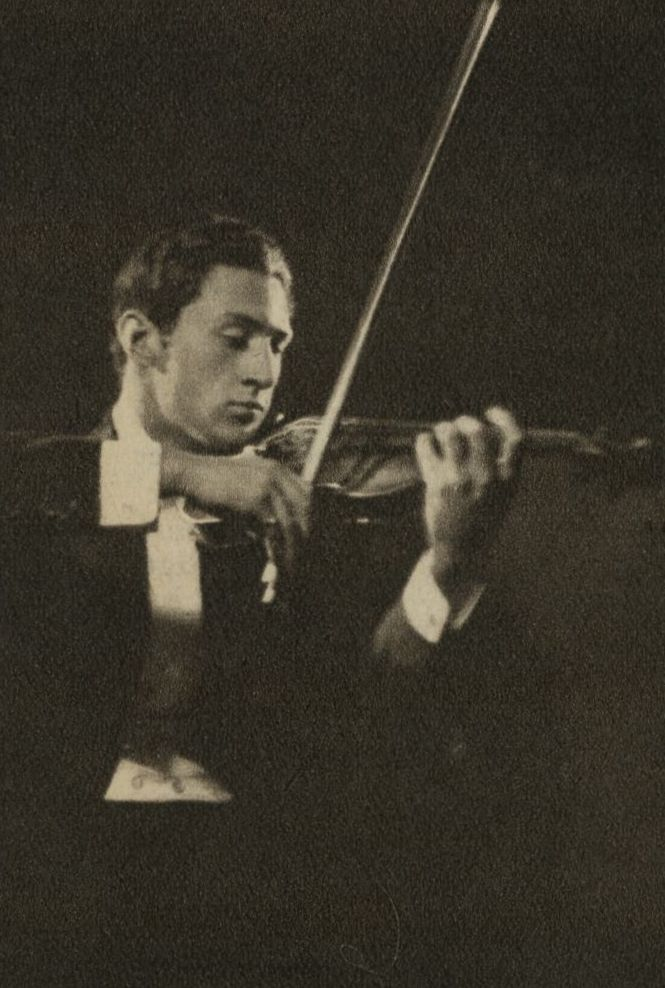

Wolfgang Eduard Schneiderhan (28 May 1915 – 18 May 2002) was an Austrian classical violinist.

== Career ==
Schneiderhan was born in Vienna. From the age of five, he was recognised as a child prodigy. After briefly studying with Otakar Ševčík in Písek, he studied with Julius Winkler in Vienna. At age 10 he publicly performed Bach's Chaconne in D minor. The next year he made his debut in Copenhagen playing the Mendelssohn Violin Concerto. He lived in England for some time from 1929, where he appeared in concerts with artists such as Maria Jeritza, Feodor Chaliapin, Jan Kiepura and Paul Robeson.

He returned to Vienna to become the first Concertmaster of the Vienna Symphony Orchestra from 1933 to 1937, and from 1937 to 1951 led the Vienna Philharmonic Orchestra. He nevertheless maintained his career as a soloist in concerts and recordings. He joined the Nazi party in 1940.

He was the soloist in the Viennese premiere of Elgar's Violin Concerto in 1947. He formed a string quartet. After Georg Kulenkampff's death in 1948, he replaced Kulenkampff in a famous piano trio with Edwin Fischer and Enrico Mainardi.

In September 1952 he made his benchmark Deutsche Grammophon recordings of all ten Beethoven violin sonatas with Wilhelm Kempff in the Konzerthaus, Mozartsaal, Vienna.

He held teaching posts in Salzburg, Vienna and Lucerne. In 1956 he founded the Lucerne Festival Strings together with Rudolf Baumgartner. He gave the 1959 premiere of his friend Karl Amadeus Hartmann's revised Concerto funebre.

== Family ==
Schneiderhan was married to the soprano Irmgard Seefried from 1948 until her death in 1988; they had three daughters together, including actress Mona Seefried (born 1957), who uses her mother's maiden name professionally.

== Death ==
He died in his native Vienna in 2002, ten days before his 87th birthday.
