= Aleksandar Marković (conductor) =

Serbian conductor (born 1975)

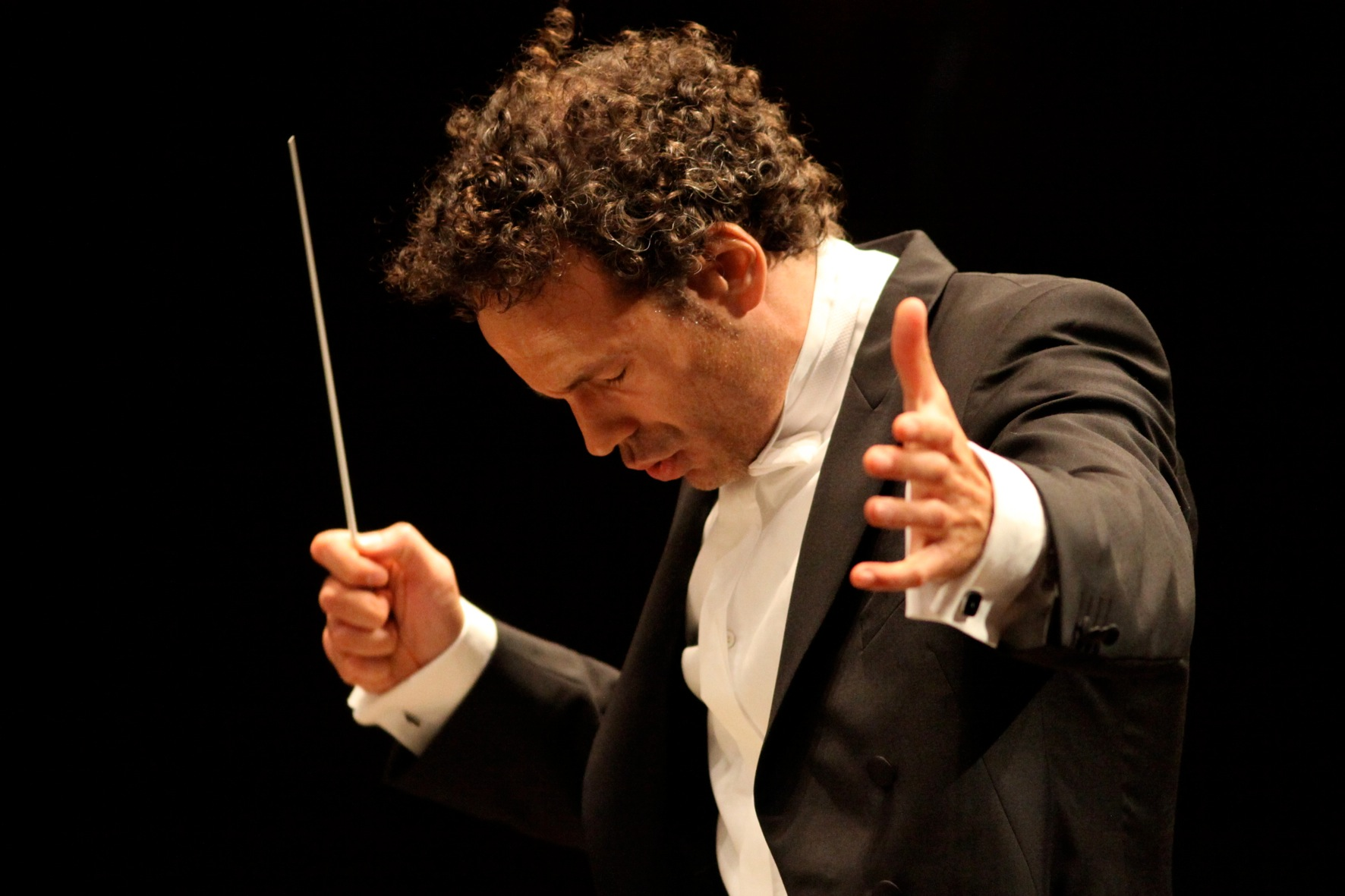
Aleksandar Markovic

Aleksandar Marković (born in Belgrade, 7 August 1975) is a Serbian conductor.

== Education and career ==
Marković studied conducting at the Universität für Musik und darstellende Kunst (Vienna), in the class of Leopold Hager. He earned a Diploma d'onore at the Accademia Musicale Chigiana in Siena, where he attended a master class in conducting. He was a holder of the Herbert von Karajan Foundation's scholarship. In 2003, he won the First Prize at The Grzegorz Fitelberg International Competition for Conductors (7th) in Katowice, Poland.

Marković was a chief conductor of Tyrolean Opera House (Tiroler Landestheater Innsbruck), from 2005 to 2008. He was a music director and principal conductor of the Brno Philharmonic Orchestra from 2009 to 2015. Markovic was the music director of Opera North for the 2016/2017 season. He is the Principal Guest Conductor of Sinfonia Varsovia (from 2022) and Chief Conductor of Vodvodjanski Symphony Orchestra.

Cultural offices
| Preceded by Petr Altrichter | Chief Conductor, Brno Philharmonic; 2009–2015 | Succeeded by Dennis Russell Davies |
| Preceded by Richard Farnes | Music Director, Opera North; 2016–2020 | Succeeded by Garry Walker |
