= Maria Badstue =

Maria Badstue (born 1982) is a Danish orchestral conductor. She came to attention after winning the special prize at the prestigious Lovro von Matačić Competition 2011.

== Early life and education ==
Badstue started conducting at the age of 17 and conducted her first professional concert at the age of 20. Since 2007 she has studied privately with Jorma Panula, and in 2011 she enrolled at the master's degree programme for conductors at the Norwegian State Academy of Music with Jukka-Pekka Saraste and Ole Kristian Ruud as her main professors.

She was trained as a trumpet player. She received her master's degree from the Carl Nielsen Academy of Music and has played with the Odense Symphony Orchestra. In 2012 she was awarded the Arne Hammebo Education Scholarship from Danish Conductors Association.

== Career ==
She is the Artistic Director and Founder of two acclaimed initiatives: Nordic Masterclass for Conductors, an initiative launched in 2012 that strives to create possibilities for young conductors to develop their skills in orchestral leadership, and INDK Symphonic Collaboration, launched in 2018, a collaborative music venture between India and Denmark, the focus of which is to strengthen relations between the two countries through the universal language of music. Badstue is also the co-founder of Copenhagen’s The Ørestad Klassiske MusikFestival. Launched in November 2021, the music festival focuses on youth and the environment.

Badstue made her debut with the Copenhagen Philharmonic in Tivoli Hall May 2013, and she has since worked with major orchestras in Scandinavia including the Gothenburg Symphony, Helsingborg Symphony, Kristiansand Symphony Odense Symphony Orchestra, the South Denmark Philharmonic, the Aalborg Symphony Orchestra and Storstroem Symphony Orchestra. In 2012 she made her opera conducting debut in the premiere of ANGELO by Lars Klit in Copenhagen. Summer of 2014 saw her as co-conductor of the highly acclaimed youth orchestra Orkester Norden, where she conducted the majority of the rehearsals for Thomas Søndergaard and led her own concert with the orchestra at the Vendsyssel Festival.

With a great interest in contemporary music, Maria Badstue has premiered several works and has also appeared with the Cikada Ensemble in Oslo. With Slesvigske musikkorps she conducted the opening concert of the Rued Langgaard Festival 2014 in a programme of music by Strauss and Langgaard.

In 2021, she conducted Cosi fan tutte.

In 2023, she made her American debut, conducting Thumbprint at the Portland Opera. The same year, she also conducted Vanessa by Samuel Barber at the Neubrandenburg Philharmonic.
