= Achim Fiedler =

German conductor

Achim Fiedler (born 1965) is a German conductor.

== Biography ==
Born in Stuttgart in 1965, Achim Fiedler studied violin at the Hochschule für Musik in Köln, in London at the Guildhall School of Music and Drama and conducting at the Musikhochschule in Stuttgart. He also attended the Tanglewood Music Center Summer Courses.

In 1996 he won the first prize of the Cadaqués Orchestra International Conducting Competition, Spain. He has been invited to conduct major orchestras such as the Sächsische Staatskapelle Dresden, Konzerthausorchester Berlin, North German Radio Symphony Orchestra, Vienna Chamber Orchestra, Royal Seville Symphony Orchestra, Barcelona Symphony and Catalonia National Orchestra and the Orquesta Filarmónica de Gran Canaria.

From 1998 to 2012 Fiedler conducted the Lucerne Festival Strings. He was also the principal conductor of the Folkwang Kammerorchester Essen. In 2018, he signed a five-year contract to become Music Director of the Sinfonieorchester Villingen-Schwenningen, starting in January 2019.
