= Staatsorchester Rheinische Philharmonie =

Symphony orchestra in Koblenz, Germany

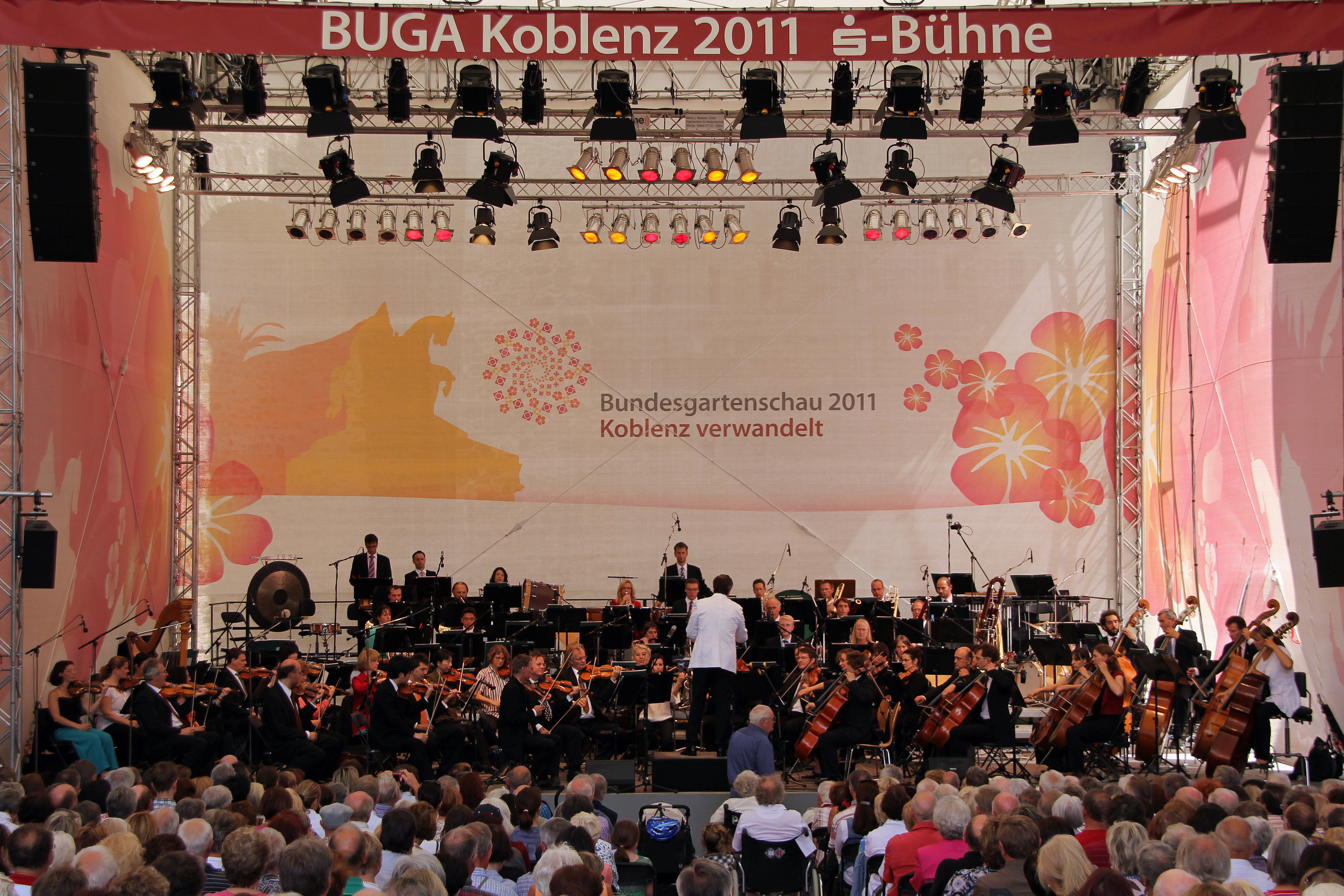
The Philharmonic performing in 2011

The Staatsorchester Rheinische Philharmonie, also known as the Rheinische Philharmonie, is a professional symphony orchestra in Koblenz, Germany. Founded in Autumn of 1945, it was adopted as an orchestra of the German state with state tax support in 1973. It is the resident orchestra of the concert venue Rhein-Mosel-Halle in Koblenz. Former principal conductors of the orchestra include Walter May, Carl August Vogt, Claro Mizerit, Walter Crabeels, Pierre Stoll, James Lockhart, Christian Kluttig, and Garry Walker. The orchestra has a good reputation internationally. Conductor Benjamin Shwartz serves as the orchestra's current musical director.

== History ==
=== 1654–1808 ===
In 1654, the Elector of Trier, Prince Karl Kaspar von der Leyen, who was residing in Koblenz at the time, founded the Koblenz Court Orchestra. As a result, the Koblenz Orchestra, under the last Elector of Trier, Clemens Wenzeslaus of Saxony, became one of the largest orchestras in Germany, with a total of 49 musicians. Only the chapels in Berlin, Dresden and Mannheim were larger. However, when the French revolutionary troops occupied Koblenz in 1794, the Elector fled, and the court and the band were dissolved. The loss of court and church music affected the citizens of Koblenz, as there had been public concerts and opera performances since 1760. Although not all of the musicians left the city, the regular concerts that were now given in the “Drei Reichskronen” restaurant, as well as other attempts to keep the concert culture alive by citizens, were not as successful as hoped.

=== 1808–1900 ===
The philharmonic tradition was only institutionalized again with the founding of the Music Institute in 1808 by the Koblenz lawyer and musician Joseph Andreas Anschuez. The Music Institute, whose task was initially church music, acted as an employer for the Koblenz orchestra musicians for the next 100 years. In addition to the symphony orchestra, it ran a singing school with a choir. The institute's most prominent music director from 1865 to 1866 was Max Bruch, who composed his famous Violin Concerto No. 1 in G minor in Koblenz, which also had its premiere in Koblenz.

=== 1900–1945 ===
In 1901, a “Philharmonic Orchestra Association” was founded, the aim of which was to maintain a permanent orchestra in Koblenz. The former Bad Kreuznach spa orchestra, which was led by Humperdinck's student Heinrich Sauer, was hired as an orchestra for Koblenz. It played both symphony concerts and opera performances. In 1907, however, the orchestra went to Bonn and became the temporary symphony orchestra of the Beethovenhalle. This later became the Beethoven Orchestra Bonn in Bonn. A new orchestra was founded in Koblenz. In 1913, the Music Institute and Philharmonic Orchestra were separated. From then on, the orchestra was called the “Municipal Orchestra”. In 1926, the positions of music director of the music institute, musical director of the theater and chief conductor of the orchestra were combined in one person, Erich Böhlke, and in 1927 Böhlke was given the title of “general music director”. Böhlke led the orchestra; During this time there were several co-productions with the Bonn Orchestra. After 1930 brought with it the dissolution of the opera and the municipal orchestra, the musicians themselves ensured the preservation of their ensemble. Until 1936, when the city took over the orchestra again, now with only 36 musicians, they played as the “Orchestra of the Association of Koblenz Professional Musicians”. On the orders of the Reich Propaganda Ministry, the orchestra was disbanded again in 1944.

=== Since 1945 ===
After the end of the World War II, in August 1945, the editor of the Mittelrhein-Kurier, Anton Tilmann Veit from Bad Ems, placed advertisements: he was looking for a conductor and 54 musicians for a philharmonic orchestra. The date of the audition, September 15, 1945, is considered the founding date of the “Rheinische Philharmonie”. The orchestra's new name implies that Veit's plans were to provide the entire Rhineland with radio broadcasts across zones. The orchestra was initially a radio orchestra. It played symphony concerts for the radio and the Koblenz Music Institute as well as in the smaller towns around Koblenz. The Catholic reading club and an inn served as rehearsal halls. From 1946 onwards, the theater was again used for opera productions. After the suspension A.T. Veits due to conflicts of interest with the French occupation and the subsequent shift in focus of Südwestfunk, which had taken over the Koblenz studio, the orchestra no longer had an employer. Until 1955, the orchestra was self-governing as a voluntary association. In 1955, the Rheinische Philharmonie became a registered association and has since received continuous support from the state of Rhineland-Palatinate. Since then, the 65–72 orchestra musicians have been paid according to the tariff. With the inauguration of the Rhein-Mosel-Halle in Koblenz, the orchestra has had a permanent concert venue for major symphony concerts since the end of 1962. In 1970 the orchestra was promoted to salary class B and became a state orchestra on July 1, 1973. Since then, the orchestra has been called the “Staatsorchester Rheinische Philharmonie”. Since 1985, the rehearsal room and thus the headquarters of the orchestra has been the historic Görreshaus, named after Joseph Görres. In 1988 the orchestra's circle of friends was founded.
