= Shin-ik Hahm =

Korean American conductor (born 1958)

- Hangul: 함신익
- Hanja: 咸信益
- RR: Ham Sinik
- MR: Ham Sinik

Shinik Hahm (born 1958) is a Korean American conductor and a professor in the Practice of Conducting and Music Director of the Yale Philharmonia. Hahm has led North American, South American, European, and Far Eastern orchestras. Recent appearances include debuts in Geneva, Switzerland, and Besançon, France; at Bolshoi Hall in St. Petersburg, Russia, with the St. Petersburg Symphony Orchestra; and reengagement with the Los Angeles Philharmonic Orchestra at Disney Hall. He is an active opera conductor and has led productions with the Silesian National Opera in Poland, has collaborated with musicians including Salvatore Accardo, Emanuel Ax, Joshua Bell, Yefim Bronfman and has recorded with the Polish National Radio Symphony Orchestra for Vision and Britstar.

== Biography ==
Maestro Shinik Hahm is a Korean conductor based in the U.S. He is a professor of Practice of Conducting at Yale School of Music and Music Director of Yale Philharmonia. Maestro Hahm has also served as Music Director of Abilene Philharmonic and Green Bay Symphony Orchestras, and performs with the Silesian Opera in Poland as guest conductor. During his position as Music Director and Chief Conductor at the Daejeon Philharmonic Orchestra from 2001 to 2006, Maestro Hahm garnered much public interest through his enthusiastic activities and creative productions. From 2010 to 2012, Maestro Hahm led the Korean Broadcasting System (KBS) Symphony as Artistic Director. In 2014, Maestro Hahm launched Symphony Orchestra for the Next Generation (Symphony S.O.N.G.) based on innovative talent support policies and working principles. The inaugural concert was successfully held on August 23, 2014, at the Seoul Arts Center. Maestro Hahm’s goal is to break free from the existing bureaucratic and conventional symphonic orchestra management system and pursue creative, independent, and free artistic values through Symphony S.O.N.G.

Preceded by Dmitri Kitayenko	Principal Conductor, KBS Symphony Orchestra; 2010–2012	Succeeded by Yoel Levi
