= Bar Avni =

Israeli conductor (born 1989)

Bar Avni-Pallentin ( Hebrew בר אבני-פלנטין; born 1989) is an Israeli conductor.

== Life ==
Avni grew up in Israel and began playing the drums at the age of eight, initially training as a classical percussionist. Later, she turned to classical music. After completing her mandatory military service in Israel, she began studying orchestral conducting at Tel Aviv University (Buchman-Mehta School of Music) in 2009, where her teachers included Yoav Talmi. Following her bachelor's degree in Tel Aviv, she moved to Europe and continued her studies with Martin Sieghart at the University of Music and Performing Arts Graz. There, she gained her first conducting experience with the Graz Wind Ensemble (Symphonic Wind Orchestra of the Graz Universities) from 2015 to 2016. In 2017, she moved to the Hamburg University of Music and Theatre to study with Ulrich Windfuhr, where she completed her master's degree in 2018. In 2017, she took over conducting courses for composers at the Hamburg University of Music and Theatre and became a lecturer at the Free Music Academy for Study, Concert and Research in Hamburg.

Avni has been a fellow of the International Kurt Masur Institute since 2021. From 2021 to 2024, she was the first woman to be chief conductor in the history of the Bayer Philharmonic and also received a scholarship (stARTacademy) from the Bayer Culture Foundation of Bayer AG from 2022.

Her guest-conducting appearances have included the Tyrolean Festival in Erl in 2016, concerts with the Israel Chamber Orchestra, the Israel Philharmonic Orchestra, and the Haifa Symphony Orchestra, and also the Hamburg Camerata at the Elbphilharmonie in Hamburg in 2021.

In March 2024, Avni won the La Maestra female conductors competition in Paris, following her selection in the final stage over two other competitors, Liubov Nosova (Russia) and Katharina Morin (Germany). During the competition, Avni was also awarded the French Concert halls and Orchestras Prize, the ARTE Prize, the Paris Mozart Orchestra Prize, and the ECHO Prize.

== Selected discography ==
- 2018: Ralph Symann – Contra.Punckt; Piano Concerto and Symphony, Project Ensemble of Young Musicians; Soloist Nina Gurol. (Timezone Records)
- 2025: Perspectives concertantes (works for harp and chamber orchestra by Dohnányi and Debussy)
- 2026: 'Symphonies in 3 Movements': Sohy, Milhaud, CPE Bach, Stravinsky
