= Lovro and Lilly Matačić Foundation =

The Lovro and Lilly Matačić Foundation was founded in 1987 according to the will of both, with an aim to improve the skill of exceptionally gifted young conductors, in Croatia and abroad.

== About the foundation ==
The foundation is a non-profit association that is striving to put the donors’ will in action: support and promote artistic development of young and talented conductors in Croatia and all over the world, as well as to publish and document works that will promote the achievement of the great maestro (Matačić monograph by Eva Sedak, albums with representative interpretations by Matačić, a number of exhibitions in the country and abroad related to Matačić's life and work).

The foundation supports young conductors primarily through grants extended to a number of candidates and through the organization of the large international competition for conductors. The foundation has offered scholarships or other types of financial assistance to numerous young Croatian conductors at the start of their careers. The supported conductors include Alan Bjelinski, Saša Britvić, Tonči Bilić, Tomislav Fačini, Ivan Repušić, Mladen Tarbuk, Luka Vukšić, etc.

With the Lovro von Matačić International Competition of Young Conductors, the foundation aims to organize an event of global significance worthy of the artist whose name it shares, and to provide an opportunity for young generations of musicians to achieve international acclaim in accordance with the nature of Lovro von Matačić's artistic legacy. In this, the foundation is assisted by the distinguished members of the foundation Council, including Riccardo Muti, Wolfgang Sawallisch, Kent Nagano, Milan Horvat, Igor Kuljerić...

== Structure of the foundation ==
=== Management ===
Frano Parać, President of the Assembly

Eva Sedak, President of the Management Board

Josip Nalis, General Secretary

=== Management Board ===
Eva Sedak, President

Saša Britvić

Prerad Detiček

Mladen Janjanin

Zoran Juranić

Berislav Šipuš

=== Supervisory Board ===
Ivan Kunej, President

Dubravko Majnarić

Miroslav Poljanec

=== Assembly ===
Frano Parać, President

Naima Balić, Nikša Bareza, Vladimir Benić, Tonči Bilić, Neno Bonačić, Ivo Delalle, Pavle Dešpalj, Dražen Siriščević, Nedjeljko Fabrio, Igor Gjadrov, Milan Horvat, Tihomir Jokić, Vladimir Kranjčević, Metoda Lhotka, Zlatko Madžar, Tonko Ninić, Ruža Pospiš-Baldani, Mladen Benčić Sedak, Zlatko Stahuljak, Anđelko Ramušćak, Ruben Radica, Mladen Tarbuk, Petar Tocilj, Sanja Žiljak, Viktor Žmegač

== The Most Significant Results during the First 23 Years of Foundation Activities ==
- Programmes of support for participation in international competitions, scholarships for studying and training in Croatia and abroad, incentives for engaging young conductors in certain projects of Croatian orchestras, training and courses with prominent conductors.
- 1st International Competition of Young Conductors Lovro von Matačić, Zagreb, 1995
- Monograph Matačić authored by Eva Sedak, Ph.D., Zagreb, 1996
- 2nd International Competition of Young Conductors Lovro von Matačić, Zagreb, 1999
- 3rd International Competition of Young Conductors Lovro von Matačić, Zagreb, 2003
- Documentary exhibition about the life and work of Lovro von Matačić (author Eva Sedak, Ph.D.) staged in Zagreb in 1999 and subsequently in Rijeka, Dubrovnik, Split, Omiš, Ljubljana, Nova Gorica, Čakovec, Osijek, Vienna, Trieste, Maribor, Skopje, Prague, Zadar, Sarajevo, Mostar, Varaždin, Berlin, Linz and Budapest.
- 4th International Competition of Young Conductors Lovro von Matačić, Zagreb, 2007

== See also ==
- Lovro von Matačić
