= Jerzy Maksymiuk =

Polish composer, pianist and orchestra conductor

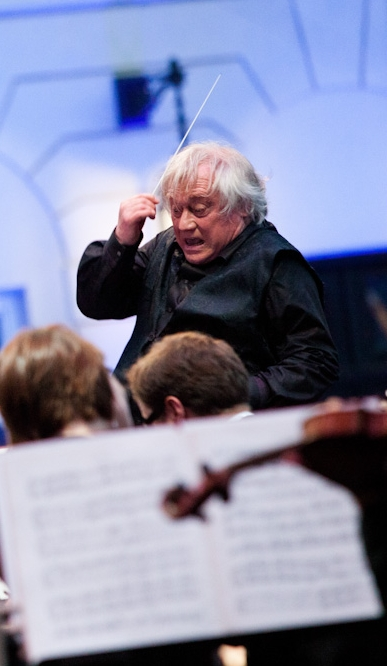
Maksymiuk in 2011

Jerzy Jan Maksymiuk (born 9 April 1936) is a Polish composer, pianist and orchestra conductor.

== Career ==
Maksymiuk was born in Grodno, Second Polish Republic (now Belarus). He studied violin, piano, conducting and composition at the Warsaw Conservatory where his teachers included Piotr Perkowski (composition), Jerzy Lefeld (piano) and Bogusław Madey (conducting). In 1964 he won first prize in the Paderewski Piano Competition; in 1973 he won an award of the Polish prime minister for his work with youth.

Conducting soon became his principal career, working with symphonic orchestras, mainly the radio orchestra with which he made several recordings. From 1970 to 1972 he was on the staff of the Warsaw Grand Theatre, conducting several operas. In 1972 he formed the Polish Chamber Orchestra (whose name changed to Sinfonia Varsovia), which soon became a renowned group around the world. It made its British debut in 1977 and toured all over the world. Between 1976 and 1977 Jerzy Maksymiuk also held the post of Principal Conductor of the Polish National Radio Symphony Orchestra in Katowice. In 1993, he became principal conductor of the Krakow Philharmonic.

From 1983 to 1993, Maksymiuk was Chief Conductor of the BBC Scottish Symphony Orchestra (BBC SSO), with which he appeared each season at the Henry Wood Promenade Concerts in London. Together, they made many overseas tours, and he became the BBC SSO's Conductor Laureate. In Britain, Maksymiuk has also conducted the Royal Liverpool Philharmonic Orchestra, BBC National Orchestra of Wales, the BBC Philharmonic, the City of Birmingham Symphony Orchestra, the London Symphony Orchestra, London Philharmonic Orchestra and The Philharmonia. For the 1993 English National Opera Christmas season he conducted Die Fledermaus. In addition he has conducted many other orchestras in Europe, the US and Japan, Australia and Israel.

Among premieres given by Maksymiuk are A Mind of Winter by George Benjamin in 1981, Still Movement by Harrison Birtwhistle in 1984, The Confession of Isobel Gowdie by James MacMillan in 1990, as well as works by Krzysztof Meyer, Paul Patterson and Kazimierz Sikorski.

In April 1990 he was awarded the Honorary Degree of Doctor of Letters by Strathclyde University. In 1999 he received the Elgar Medal conferred by the Elgar Society.

His recordings include the first uncut performance made in the West of Paderewski's massive Symphony in B minor "Polonia", which he has also performed in concert in Poland.

== In film ==
- 2018 - Concerto for Two by Polish documentary film director Tomasz Drozdowicz.

Cultural offices
| Preceded by Tadeusz Strugała | Music Director, Polish National Radio Symphony Orchestra; 1976–1977 | Succeeded by Stanisław Wisłocki |
| Preceded by Karl Anton Rickenbacher | Principal Conductor, BBC Scottish Symphony Orchestra; 1983-1993 | Succeeded by Osmo Vänskä |
