= Eugene Tzigane =

Japanese conductor

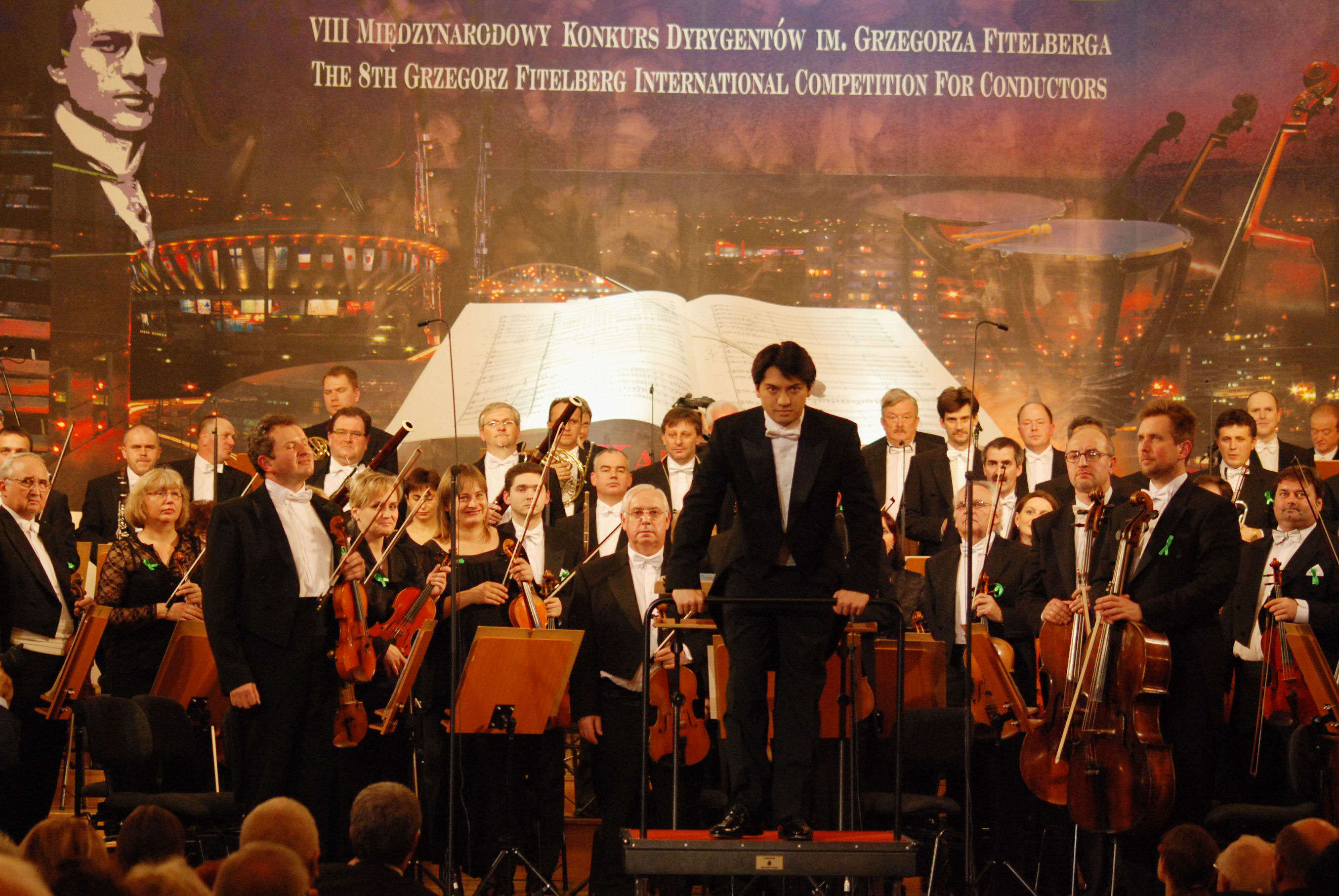
Eugene Tzigane at the Fitelberg Competition

Eugene Tzigane (/ju:dʒi:n tsi'ga:n/) is a symphonic and operatic conductor. He is currently Chief Conductor and Artistic Director of Kuopio Symphony Orchestra in Kuopio, Finland, since 2023.

== Biography ==
Tzigane was born in Japan.

== Career ==
Tzigane has guest conducted on four continents including appearances with the Deutsches Symphonie-Orchester Berlin, Bruckner Orchestra Linz, Sinfonieorchester Basel, Lahti Symphony Orchestra, New Jersey Symphony Orchestra, Oregon Symphony, Tokyo Metropolitan Symphony Orchestra, RTÉ National Symphony Orchestra, and Norwegian Radio Orchestra among many others. His operatic appearances include the Bavarian State Opera, Frankfurt Opera, and the Hamburg State Opera.

Tzigane studied with James DePreist at the Juilliard School, and graduated in 2007 with a Master of Music in orchestral conducting. He later studied with Jorma Panula at the Royal College of Music, Stockholm. His awards include the Grand Prize at The Grzegorz Fitelberg International Competition for Conductors (2007) in Katowice, Poland, and the Second Prize at both the Sir Georg Solti International Conductors' Competition in Frankfurt, Germany and the International Competition of Young Conductors Lovro von Matačić in Zagreb, Croatia.

Tzigane first guest-conducted the Nordwestdeutsche Philharmonie in October 2009. In December of that year, he was named the orchestra's next Chief Conductor, effective with the 2010–2011 season. He was chief for four seasons conducting over 140 concerts with the orchestra in Germany, Spain, Switzerland, Italy, and the US, playing music of over 60 composers including several German premieres and a world premiere. He relinquished this post as of April 2014. Tzigane served as Principal Guest Conductor of the Pomeranian Philharmonic Orchestra (Filharmonia Pomorska) in Bydgoszcz from October 2009 until May 2011, and as Chief Conductor of the Nordwestdeutsche Philharmonie until April 2014.

Tzigane guest-conducted Kuopio Symphony Orchestra since 2015, before being selected as its Chief Conductor and Artistic Director in November 2022.
