= Benjamin Shwartz =

American-Israeli conductor

Benjamin Shwartz (born 1979) is an American-Israeli orchestral and opera conductor, and music director of the Staatsorchester Rheinische Philharmonie, Koblenz (Germany). Formerly he held the position of music director of the Wrocław Philharmonic [Filharmonia im. Witolda Lutosławskiego we Wrocławiu] known for his interest in and commitment to new music. Born in Los Angeles and raised there and in Israel, he attended the Idyllwild Arts Academy in California before enrolling in the University of Pennsylvania, where he studied composition with James Primosch. He continued his composition studies in Germany with Karlheinz Stockhausen. As a conducting student at the Curtis Institute of Music, he studied with Otto-Werner Mueller and worked closely with Christoph Eschenbach and Ned Rorem. Shwartz won numerous awards including the Presser Award, and Third Prize in the 2007 International Mahler Conducting Competition in Bamberg, Germany.

== Career ==
In 2004, Shwartz was named conducting fellow of the New World Symphony and, at the age of 25, was appointed by Michael Tilson Thomas to the post of Wattis Foundation Music Director of the San Francisco Symphony Youth Orchestra and, concurrently, Assistant Conductor of the San Francisco Symphony. He became Resident Conductor of the San Francisco Symphony in 2006 and continued as music director of the Youth Orchestra from 2005 to 2009. In the summer of 2008, he led the San Francisco Youth Orchestra on a European tour, performing with them in Munich, Berlin, and Prague.

Committed to new music, Shwartz has premiered works by composers of his generation including Mason Bates, Nathaniel Stookey, Zhou Tian, and fielded American premieres including Three Asteroids by Mark-Anthony Turnage, (San Francisco Symphony, June 5, 2008), Vaporized Tivoli by Anders Hillborg (Los Angeles Philharmonic, April, 2011), as well as Israeli composer Tzvi Avni’s Piano Concerto. In 2008, along with Bates and set designer Anne Paterson, Shwartz created Mercury Soul, juxtaposing the music of composers such as Xenakis, Dennehy, Webern, Ligeti, Adès, and Bates with electronica and electro-acoustic interludes of DJ’d and classical music, performed in a night-club atmosphere in Chicago, San Francisco, and Miami.

In the United States Shwartz has conducted the symphonic orchestras of Los Angeles, Chicago, San Francisco, Oregon, Huntsville, and the New World Symphony as well as performing at the Tanglewood Festival and Atlantic Music Festival. In Europe, he has conducted the BBC Scottish Symphony Orchestra, the BBC London Symphony Orchestra, the Royal Scottish National Orchestra and the orchestras of Iceland, Trondheim, Duisburg, Nürnberg, Schleswig-Holstein, Innsbruck, Ingolstadt and the Riva Festival Orchestra in Italy. In Asia he has performed with the Tokyo Philharmonic Orchestra and the Taipei Symphony Orchestra.

In opera, Shwartz conducted Bellini’s La Sonnambula, Rossini's Il Viaggio a Reims, and Gounod’s Faust with the Curtis Opera Theater, Johann Strauss II's Die Fledermaus at the Royal Swedish Opera, Berlioz's Beatrice et Benedict at the Deutsches Nationaltheater and Staatskapelle Weimar, Bernstein's Candide at the Opera of Cologne among others.
