= Sean Newhouse =

American orchestral conductor

Sean Newhouse is an American orchestral conductor. He graduated from the Cleveland Institute of Music. In 2007, he studied at the Tanglewood Music Center. In 2010, he was appointed assistant conductor of the Boston Symphony Orchestra. On February 24, 2011, Newhouse stepped in on two hours' notice to conduct Mahler's 9th symphony, replacing an ailing James Levine in a surprise debut.
