= Sinfonia Varsovia =

Polish musical institution

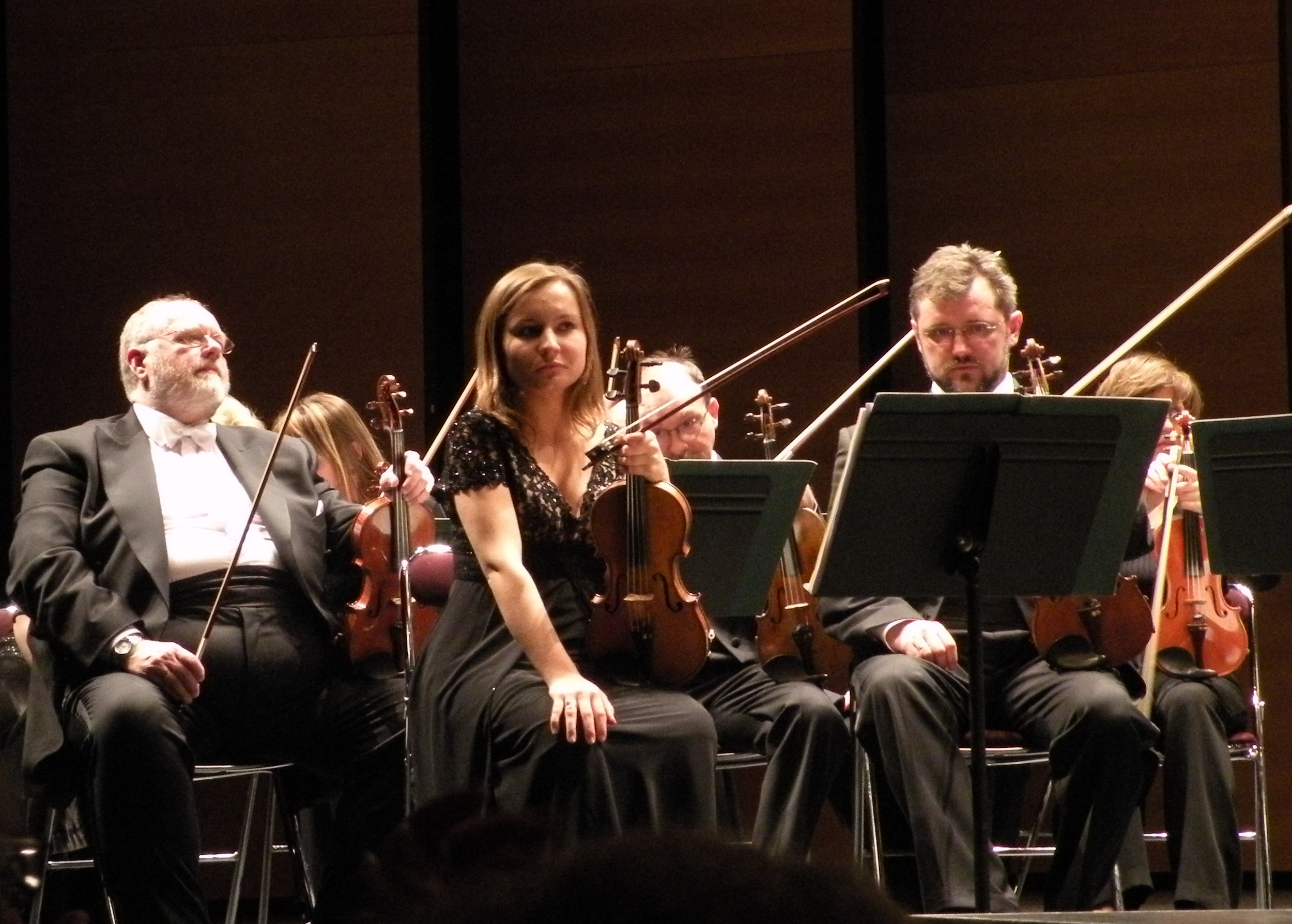
Sinfonia Varsovia orchestra during La Folle Journée in Nantes, 2009

The Sinfonia Varsovia is a Polish orchestra and musical institution based in Warsaw. The orchestra gives its concerts principally at its eponymous institution, located on Grochowska Street, Warsaw.

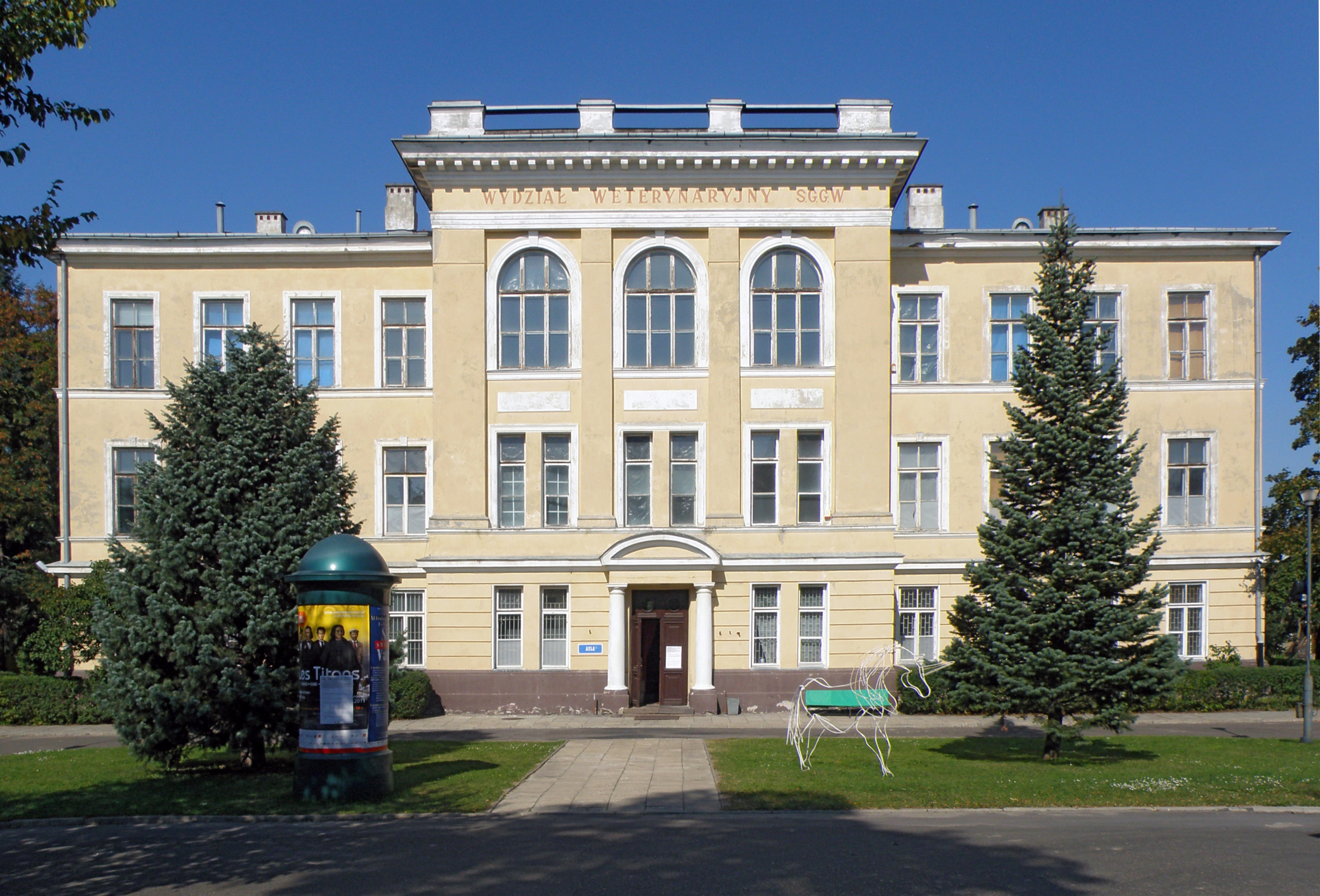
Main building of Sinfonia Varsovia's headquarters (272 Grochowska Street, Warsaw)

== History ==
Waldemar Dąbrowski and Franciszek Wybrańczyk founded the orchestra in 1984 as an offshoot of the Polish Chamber Orchestra. Dąbrowski and Wybrańczyk invited Yehudi Menuhin to work with the orchestra, after Menuhin had guest-conducted the Polish Chamber Orchestra in 1983. Menuhin subsequently became principal guest conductor of the orchestra. Menuhin and Sinfonia Varsovia subsequently recorded complete commercial cycles of the symphonies of Beethoven and Schubert.

Krzysztof Penderecki became music director of the orchestra in 1997. He then took the title of artistic director of the orchestra in 2003, and held the post until his death in 2020. From 2008 to 2012, Marc Minkowski was the orchestra's music director. With Minkowski, the orchestra recorded commercially for such labels as Naïve. In March 2022, the orchestra announced the appointment of Aleksandar Marković as its principal guest conductor, effective September 2022.

The orchestra has commercially recorded for other labels such as Virgin Classics and NIFC, along with additional recordings for Naïve.
