= Vivi Vassileva =

German musician (born 1994)

- Born: 1994 (age 30–31); Hof (Saale), Bavaria, Germany
- Occupations: Percussionist; Composer
- Awards: ARD International Music Competition; Bayerischer Kunstförderpreis; Leonard Bernstein Award

Vivi Vassileva (born 1994) is a German percussionist focused on new classical music. She has played as a soloist in chamber ensembles and with orchestras, using classical instruments but also percussion instruments from different cultures and even some derived from garbage.

== Life and career ==
Vassileva was born in Hof in 1994 to a family of musicians from Bulgaria. Both parents played with the Hofer Symphoniker; she grew up with three elder sibling who all played violin, her brother Vasko Vasilev to become concert master at the Royal Opera House. She was first trained in violin by her father. She was one of the children portrayed in the 2010 documentary 7 oder Warum ich auf der Welt bin (7 or Why I am on Earth) by Antje Starost and Hans Helmut Grotjahn. Vassileva became interested in percussion when she heard drummers on a beach in Bulgaria who played in a circle for hours when she was age eight. They invited her to play with them and she was fascinated. Her father gave in to let her learn percussion, and she played in the Bundesjugendorchester at age 13, then the youngest member. Her teacher Claudio Estay introduced her to both classical and South American music.

Vassileva was supported by the Robert Bosch Stiftung and Deutscher Musikrat. She received several scholarships and studied percussion at the Hochschule für Musik und Theater München, with Peter Sadlo from age 16 until his death in 2016. She achieved a bachelor's degree and continued Master's studies with Raymond Curfs.

In 2011 she became solo percussionist (Solopaukistin) of the Mannheimer Philharmoniker, who played a tour in China. She played a concert with the Bruckner-Akademieorchester in Munich. In 2016 she played as a soloist with the Bayerisches Landesjugendorchester on a tour including the Joseph-Keilberth-Saal in Bamberg and the Gasteig in Munich. The same year, she was the marimba player for the film Geschichte einer Liebe – Freya by Starost and Grotjahn.

She founded the Vivi Vassileva Quintett in 2015. The culture magazine of the ARD, Titel, Thesen, Temperamente, aired a 6-minute portrait of her on 24 July 2016. In 2017 she founded a duo with guitarist Lucas Campara Diniz and another duo with pianist Carina Madsius.

She made her debut as soloist with orchestra with the Hofer Symphoniker in Lichtenfeld. In 2018 she played at the LvivMozArt Festival in Ukraine, Tan Dun's The Tears of Nature conducted by Oksana Lyniv. She appeared at the Rheingau Musik Festival, the Hohenloher Kultursommer and the Festspiele Europäische Wochen Passau. She first played in the Berliner Philharmonie in 2019 with her percussion quartet. In May 2019 she played the world premiere of the percussion concerto Oraculum that Oriol Cruixent dedicated to her with the Sinfonieorchester Wuppertal conducted by Julia Jones in the Stadthalle Wuppertal. Several composers wrote music for her; and she also composed pieces.

She came to drum not only on classical instruments, but also instruments from Africa, South America and Asia, and everyday utensils and recycled garbage. In 2023, she played as the soloist in Gregor Mayrhofer's Recycling Concerto, on classical percussion instruments and many instruments derived from garbage. A concert with the Frankfurt Radio Symphony at the Alte Oper was conducted by Krzysztof Urbański.

== Awards ==
- 2007: Jugend musiziert, national competition
- 2009: Bronze medal Internationale marimba competition, Paris
- 2010: Marimba competition, Nürnberg
- 2013: Musikförderungspreis, Ingolstadt
- 2014: Special prize U21 and special prize of the Mozart-Gesellschaft in the ARD International Music Competition
- 2017: Bayerischer Kunstförderpreis
- 2023: Leonard Bernstein Award of the Schleswig-Holstein Musik Festival, the second percussionist after Grubinger to receive the award.
