= Bernstein Award =

Bernstein Award may refer to:

- Helen Bernstein Book Award for Excellence in Journalism, American literary award
- Bernstein Prize, Israeli literary award
- Leonard Bernstein Award, German music award
