= Linda Leine =

Latvian pianist

Linda Leine (born in Riga) is a Latvian pianist.

== Biography ==
Linda Leine was born and raised in Latvia, where she began her musical education at the Emīls Dārziņš Music School. She continued her studies at the Jāzeps Vītols Latvian Academy of Music under Ilze Treija and Arnis Zandmanis. Leine furthered her education in Germany, studying at the Hochschule für Musik und Theater Hamburg with Lilya Zilberstein and Burkhard Kehring, followed by a master's program in piano solo at the Lübeck Academy of Music under Konrad Elser. In October 2015, Leine and her duo partner Daria Marshinina began specializing in piano duo performance at the Rostock University of Music and Theatre.

Leine co-founded the Trio Fabel, alongside clarinetist Anna Gāgane and cellist Kristaps Bergs. The trio is recognized for its collaborations with young composers and performances of contemporary works. They made their debut in Latvia in 2019. Leine has also performed extensively as part of a duo with Daria Marshinina, including a concert at Latvijas Radio's "Klasikas studija" in 2017. Additionally, she has participated in the "Latvian New Music Days" festival, performing works by contemporary Latvian composers. Leine has also been featured on Norddeutscher Rundfunk on several occasions, including performances with soprano Pia Davila of music by Jewish composers persecuted during the Nazi era, and a concert alongside horn player Felix Klieser.

== Awards ==
Leine has received several accolades, including the Steinway Förderpreis in 2015, a third prize at the Franz Schubert and Modern Music competition in 2015, and the main prize at the 9th International Competition for "Suppressed Music" in 2016.

== Discography ==
- Schubert-Strawinsky-Vasks: A collaborative album with Daria Marshinina featuring a blend of classical and contemporary compositions; nominated for the Opus Klassik 2019.
- Irgendwo auf der Welt: An album with soprano Pia Davila paying tribute to persecuted Jewish composers of the Nazi era
- Seasons: A solo album featuring works by Latvian composer Georgs Pelēcis
