= Grøndahl =

Grøndahl or Gröndahl or Grondahl is a surname. Notable people with the surname include:

- Agathe Backer-Grøndahl (1847–1907), Norwegian pianist and composer
- Britta Gröndahl (1914–2002), Swedish writer and anarcho-syndicalist
- Cathrine Grøndahl (born 1969), Norwegian poet
- Jan Grøndahl (born 1934), Norwegian police chief and civil servant
- Jens Christian Grøndahl (born 1959), Danish writer
- Kåre Grøndahl Hagem (1915–2008), Norwegian politician for the Conservative Party
- Kelpo Gröndahl (1920–1994), Finnish wrestler from Pori in the Satakunta region
- Kirsti Kolle Grøndahl (born 1943), Norwegian politician for the Labour Party, currently County Governor of Buskerud
- Launy Grøndahl (1886–1960), Danish composer and conductor
- Mick Grøndahl (born 1968), Danish-American bass guitarist
- Roope Gröndahl (born 1989), Finnish pianist trained at the Sibelius Academy
- Tobias Grøndahl (born 2001), Norwegian handball player

== See also ==
- 18016 Grondahl (1999 JU122) is a main-belt asteroid discovered on May 13, 1999
- Bing & Grøndahl, Danish porcelain manufacturer founded in 1853 by the sculptor Frederik Vilhelm Grøndahl and merchant brothers Meyer Hermann Bing and Jacob Herman Bing
