= Ewald Arenz =

German radio host (born 1965)

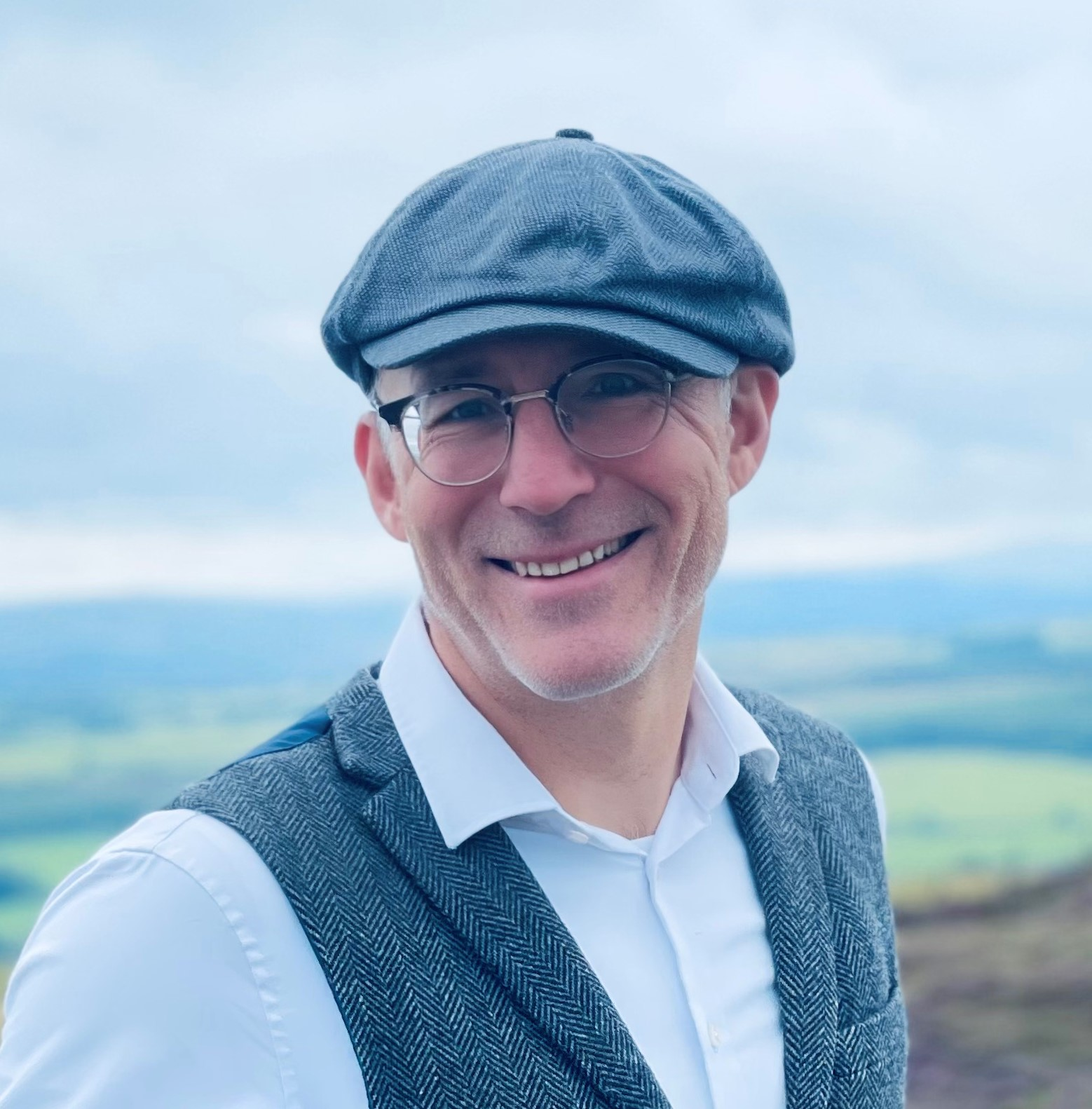
Ewald Arenz (2023)

Ewald Arenz (born November 26, 1965, in Nuremberg) is a German writer.

== Life ==
Ewald Arenz is the eldest son of the artistic Arenz family and the brother of writer Sigrun Arenz and actor and author Helwig Arenz, all three of whom published with ars vivendi publishing house. He is also related to the sculptor Ewald Rumpf (uncle) and the writer Mara Winter (cousin).

Arenz completed his Abitur (high school graduation) at the Heinrich-Schliemann-Gymnasium in Fürth and initially studied law at Friedrich-Alexander University Erlangen-Nuremberg. After a few semesters, he switched to studying English, American Studies, and History.

He has received numerous cultural awards for his literary work. Arenz hosts the show Das Feiertagsfeuilleton (The Holiday Arts Section) on Bayern 2 (a German public radio station in Bavaria) and from 2009 to 2012, he led the semester-long writing workshop at the city theater in Fürth. From 2007 to 2010, he wrote a weekly literary column titled Meine kleine Welt (My Little World) for the Nürnberger Nachrichten (a local daily in the Nuremberg-Erlangen-Fürth area). Together with his siblings Sigrun and Helwig, he continued it from 2015 to 2017 in a new form under the title Unsere kleine Welt (Our Little World). Since spring 2024, he has written a bi-weekly column titled Wie war's in der Schule (How Was School?) for Die Zeit (a German national weekly newspaper). In 2018, he moved to DuMont publishing house. Since 2020, he has been represented by the British publisher Orenda Books for the English-language editions of his work.

Arenz teaches English and History at the Johannes-Scharrer-Gymnasium in Nuremberg. He is the father of three children and lives near Fürth. Together with his brother, he regularly organizes literary events, such as the annual readings in the Fürth city park with renowned authors.

== Literary work ==
Arenz's narrative work follows a classic storytelling tradition; abstract or experimental elements are rare. While novels like Der Teezauberer (The Tea Magician), Die Erfindung des Gustav Lichtenberg (The Invention of Gustav Lichtenberg), and Der Duft von Schokolade (The Scent of Chocolate) are in the tradition of magical realism, Das Diamantenmädchen (The Diamond Girl) and Ein Lied über der Stadt (A Song Over the City) are historical novels. A characteristic that unites all these works is embedding a central human conflict within an exotic or sensory-themed context. For example, in Die Erfindung des Gustav Lichtenberg, the protagonist's inability to communicate is intertwined with the history of 19th-century technology; in Der Teezauberer, the history of tea is linked to the modern individual's conflicting longings for one great love. The tension between personal freedom and responsibility towards others is explored in Ein Lied über der Stadt within the context of early 20th-century female aviation history.

In contrast, contemporary novels like Ehrlich & Söhne (Ehrlich & Sons) or Don Fernando erbt Amerika (Don Fernando Inherits America) have a much lighter tone, often featuring humorous or slapstick elements. These works, as well as many short stories, adopt a more relaxed style, with witty dialogue and unexpected twists dominating the narrative, sometimes at the expense of plot development. The fantastical novel Herr Müller, die verrückte Katze und Gott (Mr. Müller, the Crazy Cat, and God), despite its humorous, polished style influenced by British authors like Douglas Adams and Neil Gaiman, tackles fundamental religious questions. The novel Alte Sorten (Tasting Sunlight) stands out from Arenz's earlier work in many ways. It is a classic coming-of-age novel that, with linguistic sophistication, tells the story of a complex female friendship. In comparison to his entertainment novels, Alte Sorten can be considered part of high literature due to its linguistic precision. In 2020, Alte Sorten reached the top ten on the Spiegel (a German weekly news magazine) paperback bestseller list. Der große Sommer (One Grand Summer) immediately made the Spiegel bestseller list after its release in March 2021, and in January 2023, with the novel Die Liebe an miesen Tagen (Love on Bad Days), Arenz reached number one for the first time. Der Duft von Schokolade, Alte Sorten, and Der große Sommer have been translated into English, Italian, Dutch, Polish, Spanish, and Czech.

== Awards and honors ==
- 1997: Cultural Promotion Prize of the City of Fürth
- 2002: Literature Prize of the Culture Forum Franken
- 2002: AZ Star of the Year
- 2004: Bavarian arts and literary prize
- 2005: Arts and Sciences Promotion Prize of the City of Nuremberg
- 2007: Cultural Prize of the City of Fürth
- 2019: Alte Sorten on the shortlist for Favorite Book of the Independents
- Alte Sorten on the Spiegel Annual Bestseller List 2020 and 2021
- Der große Sommer on the Spiegel Bestseller List 2021
- Der große Sommer on the Spiegel Annual Bestseller List 2021
- 2021: Der große Sommer Favorite Book of the Independents
- 2021: Der große Sommer on the shortlist for the Bayern 2 Audience Award
- 2022: Der große Sommer (audiobook version) on the longlist of the German Audiobook Prize 2022 (Category: Best Entertainment)
- 2022: Tasting Sunlight (English edition of Alte Sorten) on the longlist of the Waterstones Debut Fiction Prize 2022
- 2022: Der große Sommer Summer Hit of the Year 2022, awarded by media control
- 2023: Bavarian Constitutional Medal for Literary Work
- 2024: Euregio Literature Prize 2023 for Alte Sorten
- 2024: Prix Littéraires de l'UIAD for Le Parfum des poires anciennes (French edition of Alte Sorten)

== Literary works (selection) ==
=== Poetry ===
- Wanderungen (Wanderings). 13 Poems, illustrated by Margitta Schäfer, Heieroffset 1987.

=== Short stories ===
- Der Golem von Fürth (The Golem of Fürth). Short stories, G&S Verlag 1994.
- Der Horsbacher Fuchs (The Horsbach Fox). Short stories, G&S Verlag 1995.
- Der Teezauberer (The Tea Magician). Short story, ars vivendi 2002.
- Meine kleine Welt (My Little World). Family stories, illustrated by Irma Stolz, ars vivendi 2008; reissue 2021.
- Knecht Ruprecht packt aus (Servant Ruprecht Unveiled). Christmas stories, ars vivendi 2009.
- Meine kleine Welt 2 (My Little World 2). Family stories, illustrated by Irma Stolz, ars vivendi 2010.
- Das Flusskrokodil (The River Crocodile). Illustrated by Irma Stolz, ars vivendi 2011.
- Plötzlich Bescherung und andere (un)weihnachtliche Geschichten (Sudden Presents and Other Christmas Stories). Short stories, ars vivendi 2022.
- Urlaubsliebe (Holiday Love). Collected short stories, ars vivendi 2020.

=== Novels ===
- Don Fernando erbt Amerika (Don Fernando Inherits America). Fantastic novel, G&S Verlag 1996.
- Liebe Provinz, Dein Paris (Dear Province, Your Paris). Novel, A. Jungkunz Verlag 1999.
- Die Erfindung des Gustav Lichtenberg (The Invention of Gustav Lichtenberg). Novel, ars vivendi 2004.
- Der Duft von Schokolade (The Scent of Chocolate). Novel, ars vivendi 2007.
- Ehrlich und Söhne. Bestattungen aller Art (Ehrlich & Sons. Funerals of All Kinds). Novel, ars vivendi 2009.
- Das Diamantenmädchen (The Diamond Girl). Novel, ars vivendi 2011.
- Ein Lied über der Stadt (A Song Above the City). Novel, ars vivendi 2013.
- Herr Müller, die verrückte Katze und Gott (Mr. Müller, the Crazy Cat, and God). Novel, ars vivendi 2016.
- Alte Sorten (Tasting Sunlight). Novel, DuMont 2019.
- Der große Sommer (One Grand Summer). Novel, DuMont 2021.
- Die Liebe an miesen Tagen (Love on Bad Days). Novel, DuMont 2023.
- Zwei Leben (Two Lives). Novel, DuMont 2024.
