= Eurovision Young Musicians 2008 =

International youth classical music contest

Dates and venues
- Semi-final 1: 4 May 2008
- Semi-final 2: 5 May 2008; Theater an der Wien Vienna, Austria
- Final: 9 May 2008; Rathausplatz Vienna, Austria

Organisation
- Organiser: European Broadcasting Union (EBU)
- Executive supervisor: Tal Barnea

Production
- Host broadcaster: Österreichischer Rundfunk (ORF)
- Director: Heidelinde Haschek
- Executive producer: Michael Heinzl
- Musical director: Aleksandar Markovic
- Presenters: Lidia Baich; Christoph Wagner-Trenkwitz

Participants
- Number of entries: 16
- Number of finalists: 7
- Debuting countries: Serbia; Ukraine
- Returning countries: Germany
- Non-returning countries: Belgium; Bulgaria; Czech Republic; Serbia and Montenegro; Switzerland
- Participation map: Finalist countries Countries eliminated in the semi-final Countries that participated in the past but not in 2008

Vote
- Voting system: Each juror awarded a mark from 1–10 to each performer
- Winning musician: Greece; Dionysis Grammenos

Eurovision Young Musicians 2008 was the 14th edition of Eurovision Young Musicians. It consisted of two semi-finals on 4 and 5 May, held at Theater an der Wien, and a final on 9 May 2008, held at the Rathausplatz in Vienna, Austria, and presented by Lidia Baich and Christoph Wagner-Trenkwitz. It was organised by the European Broadcasting Union (EBU) and host broadcaster Österreichischer Rundfunk (ORF). The Vienna Symphony Orchestra conducted by Aleksandar Marković accompanied all competing performers. This was the second time that the competition was held on an open-air stage and was the beginning of the annual Vienna Festival. ORF had previously hosted the contest in Austria in 1990, 1998, and 2006.

Musicians representing sixteen countries took part in the competition, with seven of them participating in the televised final. Serbia (as an independent country) and Ukraine made their début while Germany returned. Five countries decided not to participate, they were Belgium, Bulgaria, Czech Republic, and Switzerland, while Serbia and Montenegro had ceased to exist since 2006.

The winner was clarinetist Dionysis Grammenos representing Greece, with pianist Roope Gröndahl representing Finland placing second, and violinist Eldbjørg Hemsing representing Norway placing third. Grammenos is the first woodwind player to win the competition (previous winners have played piano, violin, or cello). A new feature in 2008 was the audience prize, voted for by television viewers in the host country via SMS. Hemsing was the winner of this public vote.

== Location ==
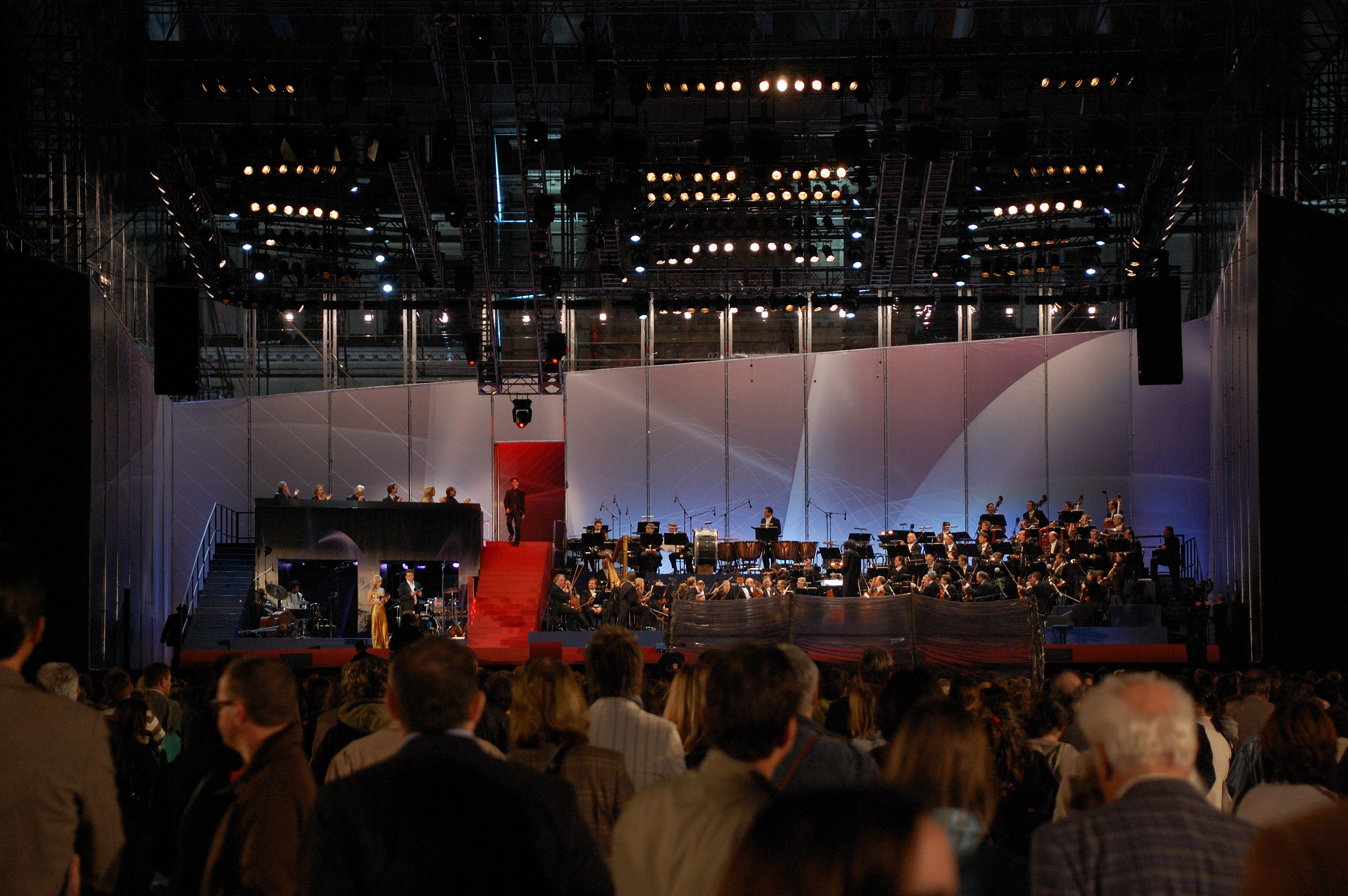
The final was held on the opening night of Vienna Festival 2008.

Rathausplatz, a square outside the Wiener Rathaus city hall of Vienna, was the host location for the 2008 edition of the Eurovision Young Musicians final. The Theater an der Wien, a theatre in Vienna, Austria, hosted the semi-final round.

== Format ==
Lidia Baich and Christoph Wagner-Trenkwitz were the hosts of the 2008 contest. The interval act was Angelika Kirchschlager performing "One Life to Live" alone and "We Dream Together" with the Vienna Boys' Choir.

== Participants and results ==
=== Semi-final ===
A total of sixteen countries took part in the semi-final round of the 2008 contest, of which seven qualified to the televised grand final.

==== Part 1 (4 May) ====
R/O	Country	Broadcaster	Performer	Instrument	Piece(s)	R.
1	Croatia	HRT	Marin Maras	Violin	1) Sonata in c minor (Largo-Allegro moderato) (Francesco Geminiani); 2) Scherzino (Franjo Krežma); 3) Zigeunerweisen, op.20 (Pablo de Sarasate)	—N/a
2	United Kingdom	BBC	Philip Achille	Harmonica	1) Little Suite (James Moody)	Q
3	Austria	ORF	Sol Daniel Kim	Cello	1) 1st Movement of the Sonata for Arpeggione and Piano (Franz Schubert); 2) Variations on a Theme by Rossini (Niccolò Paganini)	—N/a
4	Ukraine	NTU	Anna Fedorova	Piano	1) Sonata, Op. 57, I mv. (Ludwig van Beethoven); 2) Trois Valses Opus 70 N1 (Frédéric Chopin); 3) Trois Valses Opus 34 N3 (Frédéric Chopin)	—N/a
5	Germany	WDR	Kathy Kang	Violin	1) Sonata for violin and piano, 2. sentence - Allegro (César Franck); 2) Paganiniana (Nathan Milstein)	—N/a
6	Sweden	SVT	Maria Verbaite	Piano	1) Sonate in C-Dur Hob. XVI:50 (Joseph Haydn); 2) Piano Study in Mixed Accents (Ruth Crawford Seeger); 3) Islamey: Oriental Fantasy (Mily Balakirev)	—N/a
7	Romania	TVR	Stefan Besan	Violin	1) The Strolling Fiddler for Violin solo, from the Suite (George Enescu); 2) Impressions from childhood in D Major Op.28 (George Enescu); 3) Introduction and Rondo Capriccioso in A Minor, Op.28 for Violin and Piano (Camille Saint-Saëns); 4) Miniature for Violin and Piano (Gheorghe Neaga)	—N/a
8	Greece	ERT	Dionysis Grammenos	Clarinet	1) Three Pieces for Clarinet solo (Igor Stravinsky); 2) Rigoletto Fantasia Di Concerto (Alamiro Giampieri)	Q

==== Part 2 (5 May) ====
R/O	Country	Broadcaster	Performer	Instrument	Piece	R.
9	Finland	Yle	Roope Gröndahl	Piano	1) Bagatelle G-Moll, Op. 119, No. 1 (Ludwig van Beethoven); 2) Piano Sonata Op. 1 (Alban Berg); 3) Toccata (Maurice Ravel)	Q
10	Netherlands	NPS	Steven Bourne	Cello	1) Sonata for Cello and Piano (Claude Debussy)	Q
11	Slovenia	RTVSLO	Jan Gricar	Saxophone	1) Fantasie sur un theme original (Jules Demersseman); 2) Aria and Improvisation (Blaž Pucihar)	Q
12	Norway	NRK	Eldbjørg Hemsing	Violin	1) Tzigane (rapsodie de Concert) (Maurice Ravel); 2) Subito for violin and piano (Witold Lutosławski)	Q
13	Serbia	RTS	Mina Zakić	Cello	1) Impromptu G-Dur, Op.90 (Franz Schubert); 2) Introduction et Polonaise Brillante, Op.3 (Frédéric Chopin)	—N/a
14	Cyprus	CyBC	Orfeas Hiratos	Clarinet	1) Sonáta: Allegro (Franz Danzi); 2) Fantasiestuecke I (Robert Schumann); 3) 4 Miniatures: Nos 3 & 4 (Bruno Brun)	—N/a
15	Russia	RTR	Anastasia Kobekina	Cello	1) Rondo (Luigi Boccherini); 2) Noktürn (Pyotr Ilyich Tchaikovsky); 3) At the fountain op. 20/2 (Karl Davidov)	Q
16	Poland	TVP	Marta Kowalczyk	Violin	1) Fantasie Brillante sur Gounod's "Faust" op.20 (Henryk Wieniawski)	—N/a

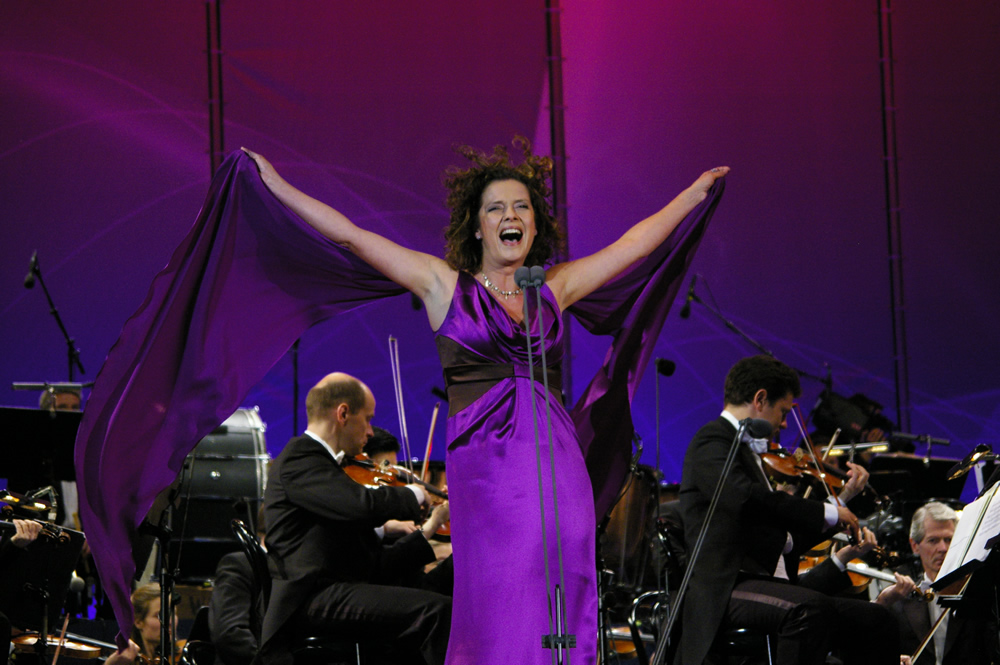
Kirchschlager performing on stage

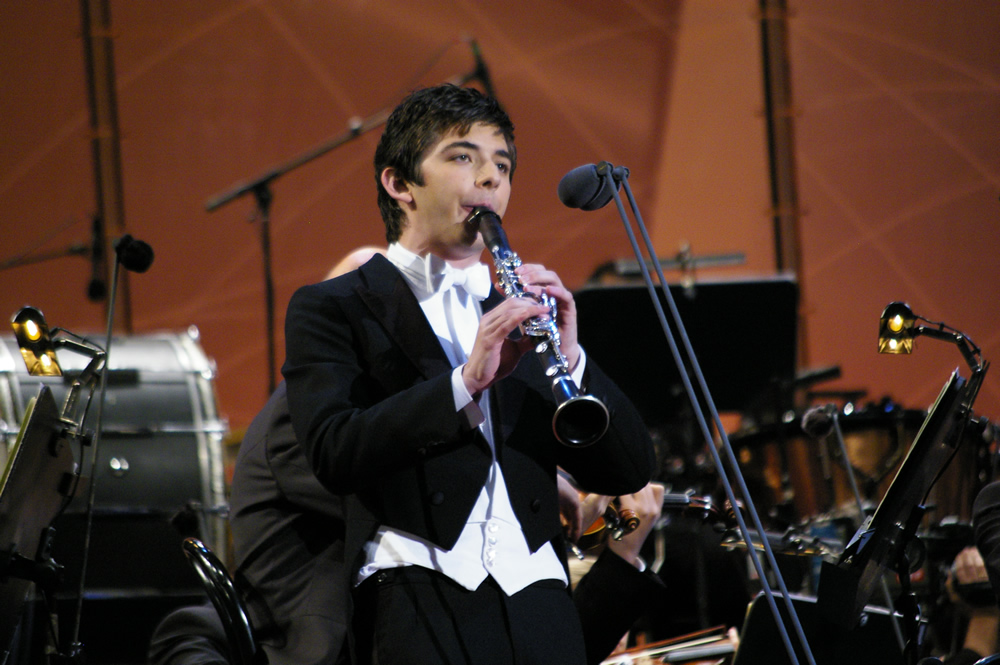
Winner, Dionysis Grammenos from Greece

=== Final ===
Awards were given to the top three participants. The table below highlights these using gold, silver, and bronze. The placing results of the remaining participants is unknown and never made public by the European Broadcasting Union.

R/O	Country	Performer	Instrument	Piece	Composer	Result
1	Slovenia	Jan Cricar	Saxophone	Pequeña Czarda	Pedro Iturralde	
2	Russia	Anastasia Kobekina	Cello	Cello Concerto in C Major, 1st mov.	Joseph Haydn	
3	United Kingdom	Philip Achille	Harmonica	Chromatic Harmonica Concerto, 1st mov.	Jascha Spivakovsky	
4	Finland	Roope Gröndahl	Piano	Piano Concerto in B-flat Minor, 3rd mov.	Peter Tchaikovsky	2
5	Greece	Dionysis Grammenos	Clarinet	Clarinet Concerto, 4th mov.	Jean Françaix	1
6	Netherlands	Steven Bourne	Cello	Elegie	Gabriel Fauré	
7	Norway	Eldbjørg Hemsing	Violin	Carmen Fantasie	Franz Waxman	3

== Jury members ==
The jury members consisted of the following:

=== Semi-final ===
- Netherlands – Jeanette de Boer
- Austria – Günter Voglmayr
- Austria – Franz Bartolomey
- Austria – Ranko Marković
- Poland – Kaja Danczowska
- Poland – Jerzy Maksymiuk

=== Final ===
- United Kingdom – Sir Roger Norrington (head)
- Austria – Ranko Markovic
- Netherlands/Austria – Jeanette de Boer
- Norway – Lars Anders Tomter
- Austria – Günter Voglmayr
- United Kingdom – Alison Balsom

== Broadcasting ==
Broadcasters in 18 countries received the competition live via the Eurovision Network and broadcast it in their territories. The competition was broadcast also in Iceland and Lithuania in addition to the competing countries. Known details on the broadcasts in each country, including the specific broadcasting stations and commentators are shown in the tables below.

Broadcasters in participating countries
Country	Broadcaster(s)	Channel(s)	Commentator(s)	Ref(s)
Austria	ORF	ORF 2		
Croatia	HRT			
Cyprus	CyBC			
Finland	Yle	Yle Teema		
Germany	ARD (WDR)	WDR Fernsehen (Note: Deferred broadcast on 29 June at 10:50)		
Germany	3sat (Note: Deferred broadcast at 21:20)			
Greece	ERT	ET1	Alexis Kostalas	
Netherlands	NPS			
Norway	NRK	NRK1		
Poland	TVP			
Romania	TVR	TVR Cultural	Alexandru Tomescu	
Russia	RTR	KTVC		
Serbia	RTS			
Slovenia	RTVSLO			
Sweden	SVT	SVT2 (Note: Deferred broadcast on 11 May at 18:15)		
Ukraine	NTU			
United Kingdom	BBC	BBC Four (Note: Deferred broadcast, in a shortened format, on 16 May at 20:00)	Nicola Loud	

Broadcasters in non-participating countries
Country	Broadcaster
Iceland	RÚV
Lithuania	LRT

== See also ==
- Eurovision Song Contest 2008
- Eurovision Dance Contest 2008
- Junior Eurovision Song Contest 2008
