= One Grand Summer =

2021 novel by Ewald Arenz

- Author: Ewald Arenz
- Original title: Der große Sommer
- Translator: Rachel Ward
- Language: German
- Genre: Coming-of-age
- Publisher: DuMont Buchverlag
- Publication date: 26 March 2021
- Publication place: Germany
- English publication date: 18 July 2024
- Media type: Print (hardcover, paperback)
- Pages: 320
- ISBN: 9783832170776

One Grand Summer (German: Der große Sommer) is a 2021 coming-of-age novel by German author Ewald Arenz. Set in the 1980s in West Germany, the story follows 16-year-old Frieder (Friedrich) Büchner as he spends a transformative summer with his grandparents, with themes of first love, friendship, and family relationships. It became a bestseller in Germany and has been translated into several languages.

== Plot ==
The novel is set in the early 1980s in an unnamed South German town, following 16-year-old Frieder during a transformative summer. After failing his ninth-grade year and needing to retake exams in Math and Latin, Frieder is sent to stay with his grandmother Nana and step-grandfather Walther, a strict medical professor, for six weeks to ensure he studies. Before leaving, Frieder meets Beate, a girl his age, at a local swimming pool while attempting a dive and immediately falls for her. With help from his sister Alma and best friend Johann, he manages to find out where she lives but doesn't get a chance to see her again immediately. As summer begins, Frieder's family, except for Alma who's doing an internship at a retirement home, goes on vacation.

Initially struggling with his strict grandfather, Frieder gradually develops a closer relationship with him, especially as Walther teaches Math and Latin in an unusual way. Frieder discovers and secretly reads his grandmother's diaries, learning about his grandparents' post-war love story, and sees his own feelings for Beate reflected in these accounts.

During a night-time break-in at the swimming pool, Frieder, Alma, Johann, and Beate are caught by the pool attendant. Frieder is given a choice: either he dives from the high board, or all four will be reported. Despite his fear, Frieder agrees, and is surprisingly joined by Beate. After the successful dive, they share their first kiss, beginning their relationship.

After Johann's father suddenly dies during a family vacation to Italy, his behavior becomes increasingly erratic. The friends end up accidentally damaging a digger in an abandoned quarry and flee the scene. Frieder and Beate have sex for the first time in his parents' empty apartment.

Johann, becoming increasingly unstable, suffers a psychotic episode where he falsely accuses Frieder and Alma of having an incestuous relationship, causing Beate to angrily break up with Frieder. As Johann's condition worsens, Frieder and Alma seek help from their grandfather. Johann is diagnosed with schizophrenic psychosis and forcibly hospitalized, a traumatic experience for the siblings who feel they've betrayed him. During this time, Frieder's relationship with his grandfather deepens as Walther helps him navigate the consequences of the damaged digger. With his grandmother's help, Frieder also reconciles with Beate.

The novel concludes with Frieder passing his resit exams, supported by Beate and Alma. The four friends, including a recovering Johann, reunite at a gravesite they had bought together during Johann's psychosis. An epilogue shows an adult Frieder meeting Beate at this same grave, leaving their current relationship status ambiguous.

== Background ==
One Grand Summer draws inspiration from author Ewald Arenz's personal experiences and observations. Born in Nuremberg in 1965 and residing in Fürth, Arenz incorporated elements from his own youth into the novel. While the protagonist Frieder is not a direct representation of Arenz, the character benefits from the author's adolescent experiences, including academic struggles and the impact of loss. Arenz noted that he felt increasingly connected to his youth in recent years, recognizing how formative these experiences were for his entire life. The novel also reflects real-life events, such as the death of a friend's parent during their teenage years, which Arenz described as a life-altering experience that influenced the narrative.

== Style ==
Arenz's writing style is characterized by its subtlety and evocative prose. The narrative structure combines present-day reflections with extended flashbacks to the pivotal summer. Critics have noted the author's ability to capture the atmosphere of a warm, long summer and the mood of 1980s Germany with well-observed details. The novel employs a light, accessible language that has been described as "light-footed" with "poetic, sometimes quite familiar images."

== Themes ==
One Grand Summer is primarily a coming-of-age story, exploring the transformative experiences of youth. The novel delves into the themes of first love, friendship, and family relationships, set against the backdrop of 1980s Germany. Nostalgia plays a significant role in the novel. The novel also explores the lingering effects of historical events, such as World War II, on family dynamics.

== Reception ==
One Grand Summer received largely positive reviews from critics. The novel quickly became a bestseller in Germany, with critics praising Arenz's subtle and evocative writing style. The novel was particularly well received by independent bookstores in Germany, which named it their favorite novel of 2021.

Doug Johnstone of The Big Issue described the novel as "subtle and evocative writing at its best," noting that "the simplicity of the story and the prose style belie the profound subtext of this beautiful coming-of-age story." The review highlighted the "generosity and joy" in Arenz's writing, calling it "very rare in modern fiction" and praising the novel's "understated and empathetic examination of a collection of characters." Christoph Schröder, writing for Deutschlandfunk, praised Arenz's "good sense for the summer-heated city atmosphere" and "the mood of the sluggish 1980s in West Germany." However, Schröder also noted some weaknesses, stating that Arenz only "scratches the surface of the ambivalence" of the grandfather character, ultimately resolving it "in goodwill." He further criticized the novel's occasional lapses into banality when including general reflections, and described the ending as "a somewhat sweet resolution in a dramaturgically simple circular conclusion."

Dirk Kruse from Bayerischer Rundfunk praised the novel as "exciting and poetic," noting Arenz's great empathy for young people and his ability to create vivid characters. Anne Smuda from Thüringische Landeszeitung praised the novel for its vivid portrayal of youth, change, and love in the 1980s, describing it as "a must-have for late summer evenings." Thorben Pollerhof from Der Standard praised the novel for its portrayal of a "perfect youth summer," describing it as a "wonderfully light read" that explores themes of first love, friendship, youthful transgressions, and death. Pollerhof highlighted Arenz's ability to convey these themes in a way that feels genuine and not overly sentimental, calling it "the good kind of kitsch" that is easily forgiven for its emotional resonance.

Tim Pfanner, reviewing for Buchszene, praised Arenz's ability to evoke the 1980s setting through "many aptly observed details." Pfanner compared the novel's literary quality to works like Siegfried Lenz's The German Lesson and Friedrich Torberg's Young Gerber, suggesting it could be suitable for school curricula. However, he noted that the story lacked surprises, writing, "Somehow you guess from the beginning how this good story will end. That's not bad, but a little disappointing." The Luxemburger Wort praised Arenz's "light-footed" language, noting that the novel "reads well" with its "poetic, sometimes quite familiar images.", suggesting that the book is "for those who want to be reminded of their own adventures - and their consequences." In the UK, One Grand Summer was recommended as a holiday read by Saga magazine, which described it as "funny, touching, troubling, with the growing bond between Frieder and the Professor at its heart."

== Adaptations ==
In May 2023, it was announced that Marcus H. Rosenmüller would be adapting One Grand Summer for the big screen. The film adaptation received funding of €700,000 from FilmFernsehFonds Bayern. The screenplay is being written by Ariane Schröder, known for her work on films such as Tour de Force and Close to the Horizon. The production is being handled by Munich-based company Windlight Pictures, making it an entirely Bavarian production.

== Publication history ==
Publication history
Language	Title	Literal translation	Release date	Translator	ISBN
German	Der große Sommer	lit. 'The Big Summer'	26 March 2021	–	9783832170776
Dutch	De grote zomer	lit. 'The Big Summer'	21 June 2022	Lucienne Pruijs	9789046829615
Estonian	Suur suvi	lit. 'The Big Summer'	January 2023	Piret Pääsuke	9789985357194
Czech	Velké léto	lit. 'The Big Summer'	9 August 2023	Tereza Jůzová	9788027516803
French	L'Ete où tout a commencé	lit. 'The Summer When It All Began'	27 March 2024	Dominique Autrand	9782226481290
Italian	Un'estate grandiosa	lit. 'A Grand Summer'	5 June 2024	Scilla Forti	9791259521217
English	One Grand Summer	–	18 July 2024	Rachel Ward	9781916788183
Chinese (Taiwan)	最好的夏天	lit. 'The Best Summer'	6 August 2024	Tong Yali	9786267537060
