= Anastasia Kobekina =

Russian cellist

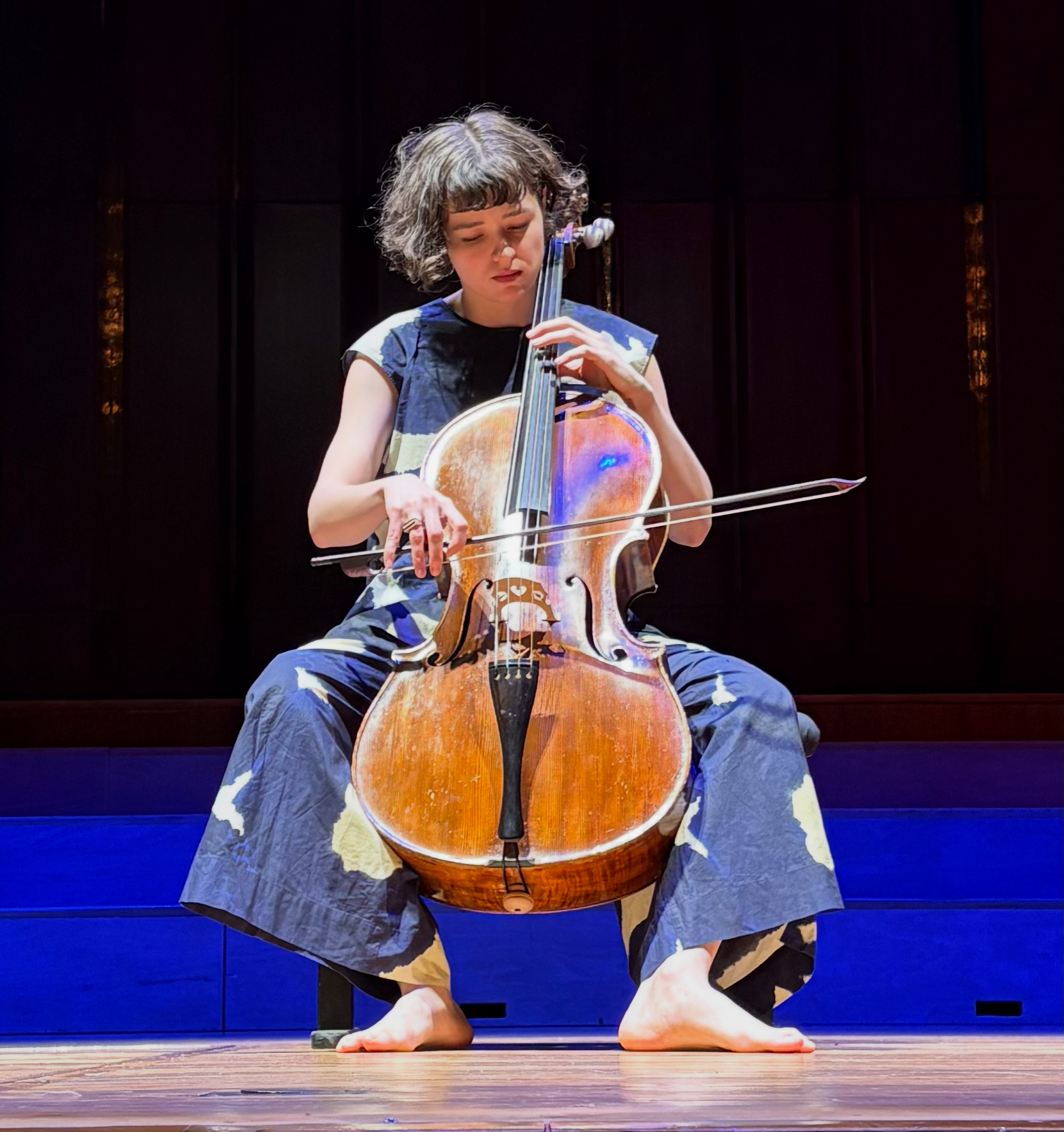
- Kobekina in deSingel Antwerp

Background information
- Born: 26 August 1994 (age 32); Yekaterinburg, Russia
- Genre: Classical
- Instrument: Cello
- Website: kobekina.info

Anastasia Kobekina (Russian: Анастасия Кобекина; born 26 August 1994) is a Russian cellist. In 2019 she won third prize at the 16th International Tchaikovsky Competition.

== Life and career ==
External videos
- Performances at the 16th International Tchaikovsky Competition
- First Round: Piatti – Caprice No. 7; Bach – Cello Suite No. 6; Tchaikovsky – Pezzo capriccioso; Prokofiev – Cello Sonata
- Semifinals: Schubert – Arpeggione Sonata; Stravinsky – "Suite Italienne" from Pulcinella; Popper – Elfentanz; Kobekin – Narrenschiff
- Finals: Tchaikovsky – Variations on a Rococo Theme; Elgar – Cello Concerto

Kobekina was born in 1994 in Yekaterinburg, Russia, into a family of musicians: her father is the composer Vladimir Kobekin. She received her first cello lessons at the age of four. In 2006, she was accepted into the Moscow Conservatory, and in 2016 continued her education with Jens Peter Maintz at the Berlin University of the Arts. She studied with Jérôme Pernoo at the Conservatoire de Paris and at the Frankfurt University of Music and Performing Arts with Kristin von der Goltz.

She was a finalist at Eurovision Young Musicians 2008. In 2019, she won third prize at the 16th International Tchaikovsky Competition.

In 2024, she performed at the Rheingau Musik Festival. The same year, she received the Leonard Bernstein Award.

Kobekina has performed since 2021 on the 1698 'De Kermadec-Bläss' cello by Antonio Stradivari, having previously played a 1743 cello by Giovanni Battista Guadagnini.

== Awards ==
- 2022 Borletti-Buitoni Trust Award
- 2024 Leonard Bernstein Award
- 2024 Opus Klassik Award for Young Talent of the Year
- 2026 Edison Award for her recording of Bach's Cello Suites

== Discography ==
Year	Title	Artists	Label	Ref
2016	Album by Father and Daughter	Anastasia Kobekina, Vladimir Kobekin	Artservice	
2018	Kobekin	Anastasia Kobekina, Vladimir Kobekin	Feral Note	
2018	Kobekin	Anastasia Kobekina, Paloma Kouider	DiscAuverS	
2018	Focus Cello	Pablo Ferrández, Benedict Kloeckner, Anastasia Kobekina, Edgar Moreau, Heinrich Schiff	Profil Medien	
2019	Shostakovich, Weinberg & Kobekin	Anastasia Kobekina, Bern Symphony Orchestra, Kevin John Edusei	Claves	
2022	Ellipses	Anastasia Kobekina, Vincent Boccadoro, Emmanuel Arakélian, Thibault Cauvin, Tristan Pereira	Mirare	
2024	Venice	Anastasia Kobekina, Kammerorchester Basel	Sony	
2025	Bach: Cello Suites	Anastasia Kobekina	Sony	
