= Mara-Daria Cojocaru =

German poet and philosopher (born 1980)

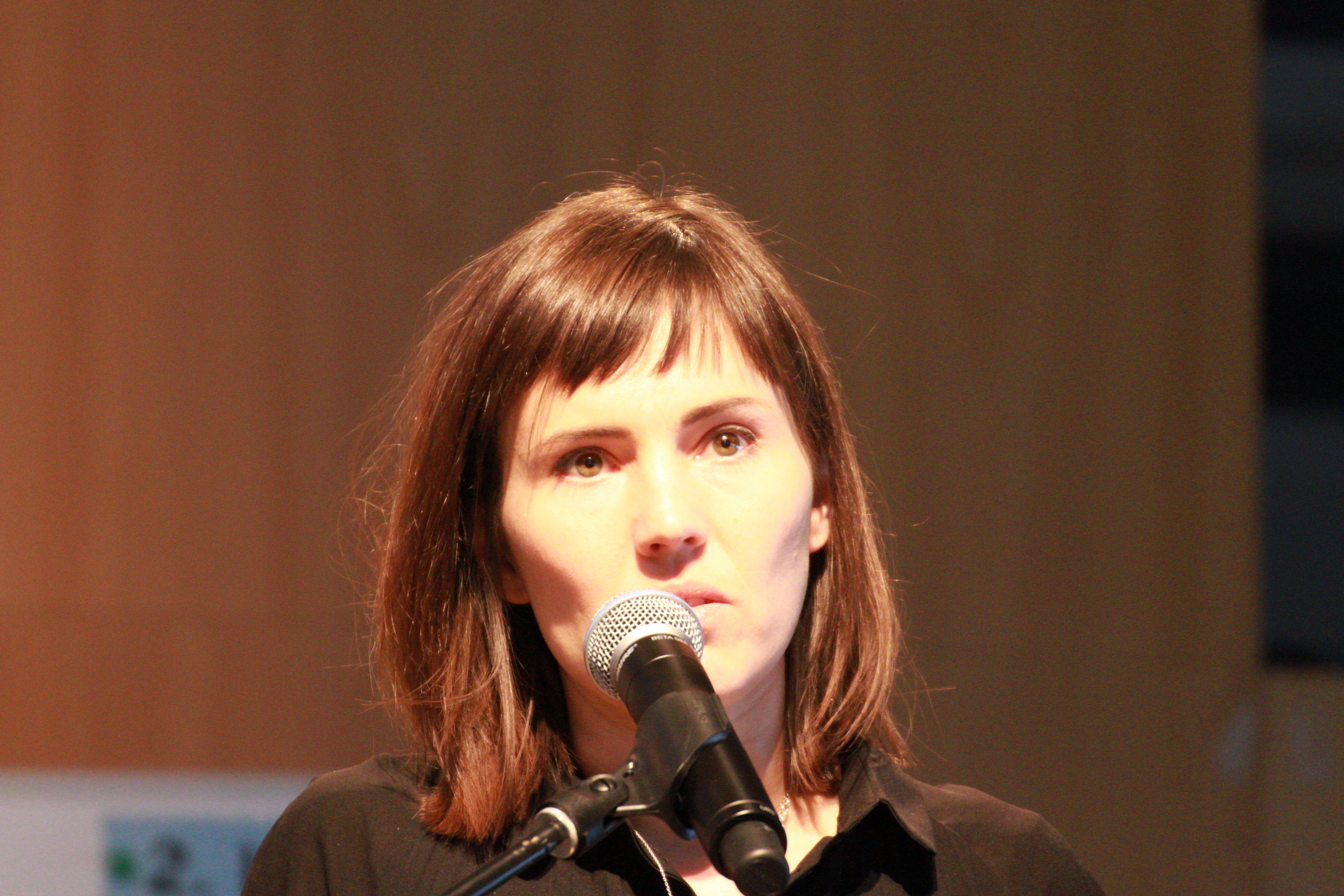
Cojocaru in 2015

Mara-Daria Cojocaru (born 7 January 1980 in Hamburg) is a German poet and university lecturer for philosophy.

== Life and work ==
Cojocaru studied political science, theatre studies and law as well as philosophy at LMU Munich. Mara-Dariya Cojocaru's first book was the poetry collection Näherungsweise (By approximation), published in 2008. In 2012, she graduated with a doctor's degree. Her thesis dealt with political philosophy. In July 2022, Cojocaru was habilitated at the Munich School of Philosophy. During her habilitation, she worked as a scholar at the University of Sheffield, the University of Brighton and the University of Veterinary Medicine Vienna as well as a lecturer at the Friedrich Schiller University of Jena.

During her academic years, she worked also as a translator of reference books.

In 2008, Cojocaru published her first poetry collection, Näherungsweise (By approximation). Her second poetry collection, Anstelle einer Unterwerfung (Instead of a Submission), was published in 2016 and has gained her much attention. Her poems have been translated into English, Estonian and Italian.

In her philosophical work as well as in her literary work, Cojocaru focuses on animal ethics and animals as our counterparts with whom we share an animalistic nature. From a Christian standpoint, Cojocaru criticises any belittlement or instrumentalisation of animals. For Cojocaru, conflicts between animals and humans occur predominantly when we neglect the aspect of our animalistic nature. Thus, in a world of over-civilisation and environmental degradation, we turn out to be increasingly estranged from our fellow creatures. Against this background, Cojocaru is "convinced that both intellectual and moral progress can be achieved by cultivating our sensibilities towards the suffering and the needs of non-human animals as realistically as required (überzeugt davon, dass sich sowohl intellektueller als auch moralischer Fortschritt daran festmachen lassen, dass wir unsere Sensibilitäten gegenüber dem Leiden und den Bedürfnissen von nicht-menschlichen Tieren so realistisch wie nötig ausbilden)."

For her artistic work on this subject matter in her poetry collection Anstelle einer Unterwerfung (Instead of a Submission), Cojocaru was granted the Bavarian arts and literary prize in 2017.

Cojocaru is a member of the international, transdisciplinary network Minding Animals and of the German Pragmatism Network GERPRAG.

== Critical reception ==
"Noch weiß man nicht recht, wohin das frische Talent diese Autorin führen wird; aber man sollte sie im Auge behalten. (We don't just yet quite know where this author's fresh talent will take her; but one should keep an eye on her.)"

– The Frankfurter Allgemeine Zeitung about Näherungsweise (Approximately)

"Cojocarus Verse sind Rätsel. Schillernd, irisierend. Sie scheinen zu atmen. Ein pulsierender Rhythmus verbindet die Worte. (Cojocaru's verses are riddles. Iridescent, opalescent. They seem to be breathing. A vibrant rhythm connects the words.)"

– Simone Guski about Anstelle einer Unterwerfung (Instead of a Submission)

"Wer aber den Mut aufbringt, die Literatur derart eindringlich und zugleich voller Sprachlust an ihre Pflichten, an die Krise der Ethik im 21. Jahrhundert und an die potenzielle Rolle der Kunst bei der Wiederherstellung eines ethischen Wertesystems zu erinnern, sollte unbedingt gelesen werden. (But anyone who has the courage to remind literature of its duties, of the crisis of ethics in the 21st century and of the potential role of the arts in restoring an ethical system of values in such a keen way that is at the same time full of love for language should definitely be read.)"

– Alexandru Bulucz about Anstelle einer Unterwerfung (Instead of a Submission)

== Awards ==
- 2017 Bavarian arts and literary prize in the category „literature“ for Anstelle einer Unterwerfung (Instead of a Submission)
- 2021 Alfred Gruber Prize at the Merano Poetry Prize
- 2021 German Prize for Nature Writing
- 2021 Mondsee Poetry Prize
- 2023 Scholarship of the Rainer Malkowski Prize

== Publications ==
=== Poetry ===
- Buch der Bestimmungen. Gedichte, Schöffling & Co., Frankfurt/Main 2021, ISBN 978-3-89561-648-8
- In collaboration with Ron Winkler: Du weißt nicht, wie schwer es geworden ist, einen Brief zu verschicken. Poetische Korrespondenzen, Schöffling & Co., Frankfurt/Main 2021, ISBN 978-3-89561-646-4
- Anstelle einer Unterwerfung. Gedichte, Schöffling & Co., Frankfurt/Main 2016, ISBN 978-3-89561-645-7
- Näherungsweise. Lyrik Edition 2000, München 2008, ISBN 978-3-86520-326-7

=== Reference books ===
- Menschen und andere Tiere. Plädoyer für eine leidenschaftliche Ethik. wbg Academic, Darmstadt 2021, ISBN 978-3-534-27338-6
- Die Geschichte von der guten Stadt: Politische Philosophie zwischen urbaner Selbstverständigung und Utopie. Transcript, Bielefeld 2012, ISBN 978-3-8376-2021-4
- As co-editor (with Michael Reder): Zur Praxis der Menschenrechte: Formen, Potenziale und Widersprüche (Globale Solidaritat – Schritte zu Einer Neuen Weltkultur). Kohlhammer, Stuttgart 2015 (E-Book), ISBN 978-3-17-028902-4
- As co-editor (with Michael Reder): Zukunft der Demokratie: Ende einer Illusion oder Aufbruch zu neuen Formen? Kohlhammer, Stuttgart 2014, ISBN 978-3-17-025350-6
- As co-editor (with Michael Reder and Hanna Pfeifer): Was hält Gesellschaften zusammen? Der gefährdete Umgang mit Pluralität. Kohlhammer, Stuttgart 2013, ISBN 978-3-17-022964-8
- As co-editor of the 2nd edition (with Monika Betzler and Julian Nida-Rümelin): Ästhetik und Kunstphilosophie. Von der Antike bis zur Gegenwart in Einzeldarstellungen (= Kröners Taschenausgabe. Band 375). 2., updated and supplemented edition. Kröner, Stuttgart 2012, ISBN 978-3-520-37502-5

=== Translations ===
- Donald R. Moor: Auf einen Kaffee mit Platon. Deutscher Taschenbuch Verlag, München 2009, ISBN 978-3-423-34544-6
- Jonathan Barnes: Auf einen Kaffee mit Aristoteles. Deutscher Taschenbuch Verlag, München 2010, ISBN 978-3-423-34592-7
