= Bayerischer Kunstförderpreis =

Bavarian arts and literary prize

Bayerischer Kunstförderpreis is a Bavarian arts and literary prize.

== Selected winners ==
=== 2002 ===
Performing arts

- Stefanie Dietrich (actress)
- Barbara Schöller (actress)
- Christian Hettkamp (actor)
- Marc Oliver Schulze (actor)

=== 2004 ===
Performing Arts

- Brigitte Hobmeier (Actress)
- Nina Kunzendorf (Actress)
- Thomas Loibl (Actor)
- Stefan Sevenich (Singer)

Fine Arts

- Karin Bergdolt
- Martin Fengel
- Marco Schuler
- Wolfgang Stehle
- Cora Piantoni (Special category: Photography)

Music and Dance

- Sunday Night Orchestra (Bigband)
- Martin Rasch (Pianist)
- Minas Borboudakis (Composer)
- Avetik Karapetyan (Dancer)
- Ilja Sarkisov (Dancer)

Literature

- Ewald Arenz
- Claudia Klischat
- Wieland Freund

=== 2005 ===
Performing Arts

- Bettina Schmidt (actress)
- Sabina von Walther
- Dieter Fischer (actor)
- Robert Joseph Bartl

Fine Arts

- Heike Döscher
- Martina Salzberger
- Richard Schur
- Peter Senoner

Music and Dance

- Ivy Amista (Dancer)
- Michael Wollny (Pianist)
- Dessi Slava Kepenerova (Drummer)
- Joachim F.W. Schneider (Composer)

Literature

- Lena Gorelik
- Jens Petersen
- Volker Klüpfel
- Michael Kobr

=== 2006 ===
Performing Arts

- Marina Galic (Actress)
- Maximilian Brückner (Actor)
- Silke Evers (Singer)
- Daniela Sindram (Singer)

Fine Arts

- Ingrid Floss (Painter)
- Veronika Veit (Sculptor)
- Christian Hiegle (Painter)
- Michael Schrattenthaler (Installation Artist)
- Florian Tuercke (Performance Artist)

Music and Dance

- Claus Raible (Pianist)
- Laura Konjetzky (Pianist)
- Alessandro Sousa Pereira (Dancer)
- Marko Zdralek (Composer)

Literature

- Katja Huber (Writer)
- Nuran David Calis (Playwright)
- Nora Gomringer (Lyricist)

=== 2007 ===
Performing Arts

- Katharina Schubert (Actress)
- Aurel Bereuter (Actor)
- Marco Steeger (Actor)
- Tilmann Unger (Tenor)

Fine Arts

- Annegret Hoch (Painter)
- Thorsten Franck (Furniture Designer)
- Axel Gercke (Painter)
- Alfred Kurz (Sculptor)
- Stefan Wischnewski (Sculptor)

Music and Dance

- Veronika Eberle (Violinist)
- Alexander Muno (Composer)
- Daniel Zaboj (Choreographer)
- Kammermusikensemble Piano Ensemble

Literature

- Maximilian Dorner (Writer)
- Daniel Grohn (Writer)
- Thomas von Steinaecker (Writer)
- Nikolai Vogel und Kilian Fitzpatrick (Authors)

=== 2008 ===
Performing arts

- Sophia Brommer (Sopranistin)
- Reto Raphael Rosin (Tenor)
- Felix Rech (actor)
- Judith Toth (actress)

Fine arts

- Sebastian Kuhn (Bildhauer)
- Oh-Seok Kwon (Bildhauer)
- Petra Schneider (Fotografin)
- Lorenz Straßl (Fotograf)
- Nicki Marquardt (Hutmacherin) - Spezialpreis -

Music and dance

- Caroline Matthiessen (dancer)
- Philipp Weiss (Jazz singer)
- VoicesInTime (Rock- & Jazzchor)
- Duo d'Accord - Lucia Huang und Sebastian Euler (Klavierduo)

Literature

- Karin Fellner (Lyrikerin)
- Stefanie Geiger (Schriftstellerin)
- Luis Ruby (Übersetzer)

=== 2009 ===
Performing arts

- Stephanie Hampl (Mezzosopranistin)
- Heidi Elisabeth Meier (Sopranistin)
- Shenja Lacher (actor)
- Michael Stange (actor)

Fine arts

- Lena Bröcker (artist)
- Florian Haller (Maler)
- Dashdemed Sampil (Maler)
- Katharina Gaenssler (Fotografin)
- Ladislav Zajac (Bühnenbildner) - Spezialpreis -

Music and dance

- Christine Ceconello (dancer)
- Markus Elsner (Dirigent und Musiker)
- Andreas Kurz (Kontrabassist)
- David Theodor Schmidt (Pianist)

Literature

- Beate Teresa Hanika (Schriftstellerin)
- Anja Utler (Lyrikerin)
- Benedict Wells (Schriftsteller)

=== 2010 ===
Performing arts

- Julia Bartolome (actress)
- Sibylla Duffe (Sopranistin)
- Jan Friedrich Eggers (Bariton)
- Nico Holonics (actor)

Fine arts

- Susu Gorth (artist)
- Eva-Maria Raschpichler (artist)
- Christian Schnurer (Künstler)
- Frank Stürmer (Fotograf)
- Carlos de Abreu (Künstler) - Spezialpreis -

Music and dance

- Herbert Schuch (Pianist)
- Saúl Vega Mendoza (Tänzer)
- Double Drums (Schlagzeug-Duo Alexander Glöggler und Philipp Jungk)
- Alex Wienand Trio (Jazztrio mit Alexander Wienand, Felix Himmler und Tobias Schirmer)

Literature

- Stephan Knösel für den Jugendroman Echte Cowboys
- Tom Schulz für den Lyrikband Kanon vor dem Verschwinden
- Benjamin Stein für den Roman Die Leinwand

=== 2011 ===
Performing arts

- Hrachuhí Bassénz (singer)
- Monika Lichtenegger (singer)
- Maria Vogt (actress)
- Lucy Wirth (actress)

Literature

- Katharina Eyssen für ihren Debütroman Alles Verbrecher
- Veronika Rotfuß für ihren Jugendroman Mücke im März
- Max Scharnigg für den Roman Die Besteigung der Eiger-Nordwand unter einer Treppe

Fine arts

- Duo Matthias Böhler / Christian Orendt (Installationskünstler)
- Alexander Laner (Bildhauer)
- Emanuel Seitz (Maler)
- Susanne Wagner (Videoartist)
- Christoph Kienzle (Designer, Illustrator)

Music and dance

- Gözde Özgür (dancer)
- Jaione Zabala (dancer)
- William Youn (Pianist)
- Alexander von Hagke (Saxophonist, Klarinettist, Komponist)

=== 2012–present ===
==== Fine art ====
- 2012: Michael Biber; Beate Engl; Simona Koch; Clea Stracke und Verena Seibt; Leonie Felle; Anna Witt
- 2013: Alexander Hick; Martin Hotter; Silke Markefka; Maitra Wakil; Justin Almquist; Tim Wolff
- 2014: Boban Andjelkovic; Felix Burger; Hedwig Eberle; Jasmin Schmidt; Elisabeth Wieser
- 2015: Gabi Blum; Matthias Glas; Philipp Gufler; Andreas Peiffer
- 2016: Jakob Egenrieder; Miho Kasama; Funda Gül Özcan; Felix Leon Westner; Anna McCarthy
- 2017: Florentin Berner; Andreas Chwatal; Michael Seidner; Johannes Tassilo Walter; Christoph Weißhaar
- 2018: Claudia Barcheri; Sebastian Dacey; Sophia Süßmilch; Benjamin Zuber; Easy!upstream (Susi Gelb, Niko Abramidis, Quirin Brunnmeier); Edel Extra (Susanne Wohlfahrt, Claudia Holzinger, Lilly Urbat); Prince of Wales (Jonas von Ostrowsky, Leo Lencés)
- 2019: Izabela Tarasewicz; Alexandros Tsioris; Jonas Tröger; Sebastian Tröger; Cana Bilir-Meier
- 2020: Stephan Janitzky; Irina Ojovan; Paula Leal Olloqui; Lea von Wintzingerode; Künstlerduo Viola Relle und Raphael Weilguni

==== Literature ====
- 2012 Lydia Daher, Christian Lorenz Müller, Elias Wagner
- 2013 Martin Beyer, Jonas Lüscher, Christian Schloyer
- 2014 Kenah Cusanit, Joshua Groß, Susanne Krones, Manuel Niedermeier
- 2015 Silke Kleemann, Lilian Loke, Tobias Roth, Barbara Yelin
- 2016 Pierre Jarawan, Mercedes Lauenstein, Jan Schönherr
- 2017 Pierre-Henri Campbell, Mara-Daria Cojocaru, Kristina Pfister
- 2018 Helwig Arenz, Anne Freytag, Dominik Wendland
- 2019 Katharina Adler, Tristan Marquardt, Nora Zapf, Benedikt Feiten
- 2020 Lisa Frühbeis, Lisa Jeschke, Dana von Suffin, Andreas Thamm

==== Music and dance ====
- 2012 Max Zachrisson (Tanz), Stefanie Schumacher (Akkordeon), Andreas Mildner (Harfe), INDEX Ensemble (Musikerinnen und Musiker)
- 2013 Wlademir Faccioni (Tanz), Tim Allhoff (Jazz-Piano und Komposition), Alexander Schimpf (Klavier), Christian Elin (Tenor-Saxophon)
- 2014 Marina Miguélez (Tanz), Monika Roscher (E-Gitarre, Jazz-Komposition), Johannes X. Schachtner (Komposition, Dirigieren), Maximilian Hornung (Cello)
- 2015 Jonah Cook (Tanz), Theophilus Jeremias Veselý (Tanz), Leo Betzl (Jazz-Piano, Jazz-Komposition), Goldmund Quartett (Streichensemble)
- 2016 Sayaka Kado (Tanz), Arcis Saxophon Quartett (Saxophonensemble), Christian Elsässer Jazz Orchestra (Jazzensemble), Benno Schachtner (Countertenor)
- 2017 Vivi Vassileva (Percussion), Rebekka Trescher/Ensemble 11 (Jazz), Moritz Stahl (Saxophone), Johannes Öllinger (Gitarre)
- 2018 Matthias Lindermayr (Jazz-Trompete), Henrik Ajax (Komposition, Piano), Gregor A. Mayrhofer (Dirigent, Komposition, Pianist), Rachelle Scott (Tanz)
- 2019 Alexsandro Akapohi (Tanz), Raphaela Gromes (Cello), Angela Metzger (Orgel), “Verworner Krause Kammerorchester - VKKO” (Ensemble)
- 2020 Sofie Vervaecke (Tanz), Aris Alexander Blettenberg (Pianist, Dirigent und Komponist), Johanna Soller (Dirigentin), Gustavo Strauß – Paranormal String Quartet (Jazz)

==== Performing arts ====
- 2012 Betsy Horne, Tilman Lidchi, Genija Rykova, Andrea Wenzl
- 2013 Josephine Köhler, Friederike Ott, Xenia Tiling, Verena Semieniuk
- 2014 Anna-Maria Thoma, Anna Drexler, Cathrin Lange, Franz Pätzold
- 2015 Danae Kontora, Jakob Keller, Ludwig Mittelhammer, Valery Tscheplanowa
