= Richard Schur =

Germain Painter

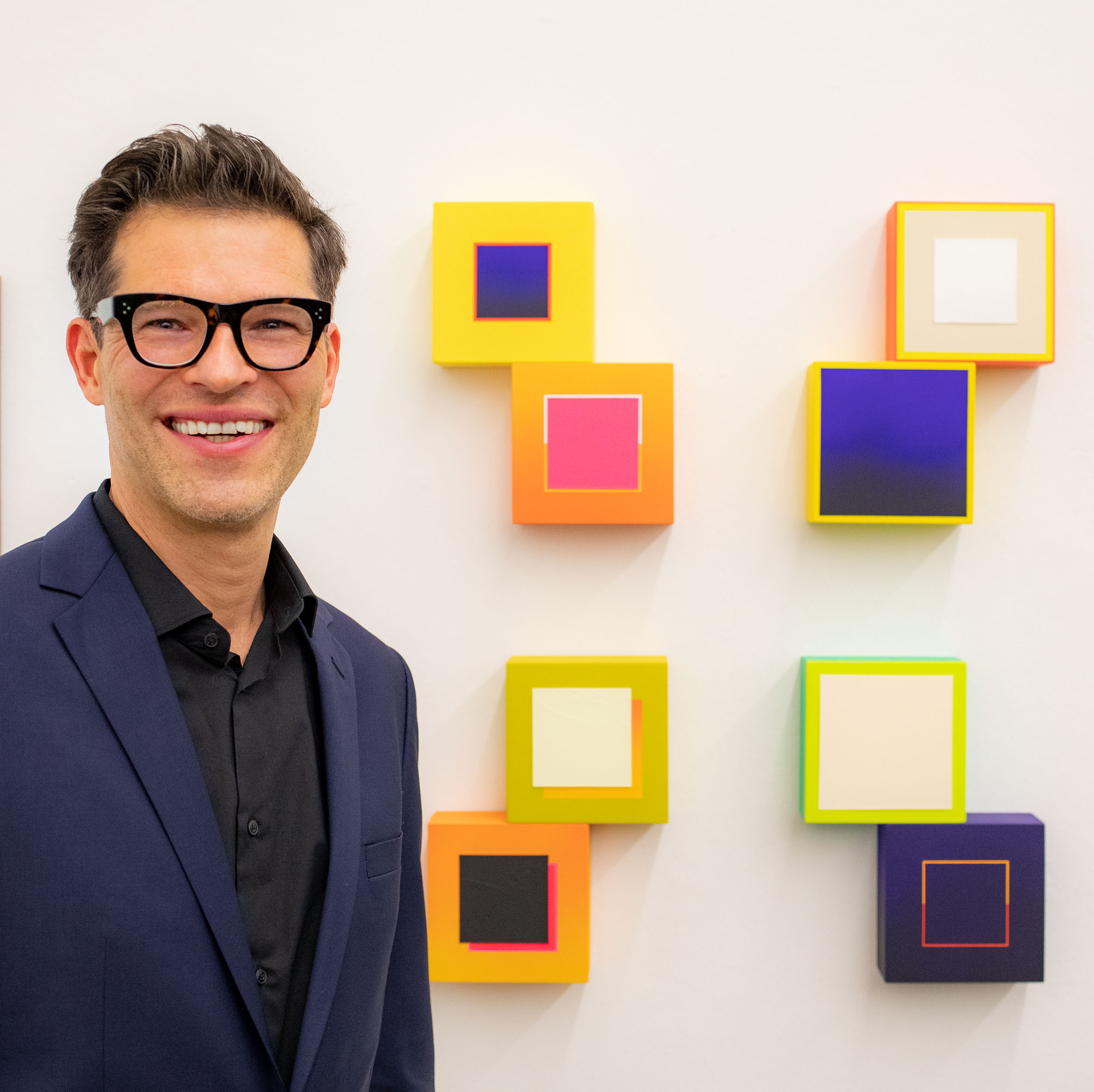
- Richard Schur (2018)
- Born: Munich, Germany
- Education: Academy of Fine Arts, Munich
- Known for: Painting, Abstract art
- Website: www.richard-schur.com

Richard Schur (born 1971) is a German artist.

== Career ==
Richard Schur studied at the Academy of Fine Arts Munich and graduated as Master of Fine Arts in 2000. From 2002 to 2008 he taught painting as assistant professor with Jerry Zeniuk at the Academy of Fine Arts Munich. In 2005 he received the arts prize Bayerischer Kunstförderpreis. Schur's work has been shown in galleries and museums since 1998.

== Work ==
Schur is known for complex abstract paintings, combining "visual enquiry and art historical references with an element of playfulness". His works have been described as "Metaphorical Grids", containing clear color blocks, presented with the geometric precision of Piet Mondrian.

Initially Schur works with studies, allowing his motifs to evolve over an extended period of time, experimenting with color choices as part of an intuitive process. The motifs are then transferred to larger canvases or grounds, on which the artist uses the formal language of Hard-edge painting to "gain a sense of clarity in the interaction of colors". His art is also about bringing together the "light, spirit and atmosphere" of various locations around the world that have inspired him.

== Awards, Grants, Residendies ==
- Bayerischer Kunstförderpreis of the Bavarian State Ministry of Science, Research and the Arts
- ISCP, International Studio & Curatorial Program, New York
- Residency at the CCA, Centro Cultural Andraxt, Spain
- Grant USA Scholarship of the Bavarian State Ministry of Sciences, Research and the Arts
- Residency Cité Internationale des Arts, Paris

== Collections (selection) ==
- Pinakothek der Moderne, Munich
- CCA, Centro Cultural Andraxt, Spain
- CAAM, Centro Atlàntico de Arte Moderno, Las Palmas de Gran Canaria, Spain
- Guangdong Museum of Art, China

== Exhibitions ==
2025

- "Soloshow Richard Schur", Kristin Hjellegjerde Gallery, West Palm Beach, Florida, United States of America
- „Theorie und Praxis“, Galerie Filser & Gräf, Galeriestr. 6 Munich, Germany

2024

- „Positions Berlin Art Fair“, Galerie Filser & Gräf, Hangar 7 Berlin, Germany
- „The Geometry of Abstraction“, Paul Smith, 9 Albemarle London, United Kingdom
- „Korea Galleries Art Fair 2024“, K.O.N.G. Gallery, Seoul , South Korea

2023

- „Liminal Space“, Galerie 21.06, Ravensburg, Germany
- „Edge of Abstraction“, Kristin Hjellegjerde London Bridge Gallery, London, United Kingdom

2021

- „Blues - The Color, the Music and the State of Mind“, Cross Mackenzie Gallery, HillsboroVA, USA
- „Highway Song“, Galeria Manuel Ojeda, Las Palmas de Gran Canaria, Spain

2020

- „Everything“, Kristin Hjellegjerde, Berlin, Germany
- „Noir et Couleur“, Espace Meyer Zafra, Paris, France

2019

- „Untitled“, Minus Space, Brooklyn, NY, USA
- „Alleando“, Galerie Corona Unger, Bremen, Germany
- „The Sound of Color, Galerie der Moderne“, Stefan Vogdt, Munich, Germany
- „Jahresgaben“, Kunstverein München, Munich, Germany

2018

- „Metropolis“, Galerie Ebbers, Kranenburg, Germany
- „Sounds of Light“, Galerie 21.06, Ravensburg, Germany
- „Between Structure and Disorder“, Kristin Hjellegjerde, Berlin, Germany
- „Roter Faden -Schwarz“, Galerie Klaus Braun, Stuttgart, Germany
- „4ABSTRACTs2NOT“, QuadrART Dornbirn, Austria

2017

- „The Sound of Color, Galerie der Moderne“, Stefan Vogdt, Munich, Germany
- „Richard Schur and Douglas Degges“, Shim, Brooklyn, NY, USA
- „Richard Schur en Stephan Fritsch“, ACEC, Apeldoorn, Netherlands
- „Art New York“, with Espace Meyer Zafra, New York
- „Art Market Hamptons“, with Cross Mackenzie Gallery, Bridgehampton Museum, NY, USA
- „Ganz Konkret“, Galerie Klaus Braun, Stuttgart, Germany
- „Jahresgaben“, Kunstverein München, Munich, Germany
- „Jahresgaben 2017“, Kunstverein Augsburg, Germany
- „Mittsommer – 30 Jahre Artothek!“, Staedtische Artothek Munich Sammlung Opitz Hoffmann, Munich, Germany
- „Mittsommer – 30 Jahre Artothek!“, Stadtmuseum & Kunstsammlung Jena, Germany
- „Mittsommer – 30 Jahre Artothek!“, Galerie Klaus Braun, Stuttgart, Germany
- „Munich Impression“, Galerie Claudia Weil, Friedberg-Rinnenthal, Germany

2016

- „Meadows“, Cross Mackenzie Gallery, Washington DC, USA
- „Manhattan Stories“, Galerie Postel, Hamburg, Germany
- „Break Ground: Amrhein-Welish, Schur-Seligson“, ART 3, Brooklyn, NY, USA
- „Winter Spring Show 2016“, Espace Meyer Zafra, Paris
- „Lucky Draw“, Sculpture Center, New York, USA
- „Wendezeiten“, CCA Andraxt Kunsthalle, Mallorca, Spain
- „Sammlung Opitz-Hoffmann“, Stadtmuseum und Kunstsammlung Jena, Germany
- „Summer Saunter“, Galerie Klaus Braun, Stuttgart, Germany
- „Jahresgaben“, Kunstverein München, Munich, Germany

2015

- „Verve“, Kristin Hjellegjerde, London, United Kingdom
- „Weight for the Showing“, Maddox Arts, London, United Kingdom
- „Jahresgaben“, Kunstverein München, Munich, Germany
- „Summer Show“, Cross Mackenzie, Washington DC, USA
- „We are pleased to invite you #5“, Carlos Carvalho Arte Contemporanea, Lissabon, Portugal
- „Neue Münchner Malerei VI“, Galerie der Moderne, Stefan Vogdt, Munich, Germany
- „Bushwick Open Studios“, with ART 3, Brooklyn, NY, USA
- „Editionen“, Galerie Ebbers at ACEC; Apeldoorn, Netherlands
- „Richard Schur – The Graphic Works“, Gallery O-68, Velp, Netherlands
- „Arbeiten auf Papier“, Galerie Klaus Braun, Stuttgart, Germany

2014

- „White Lights“, Galerie Ebbers, Kranenburg, Germany
- „Small Works & Toy Stories“, ART 3, Brooklyn, NY, USA
- „Cruce de colecciones“, Centro Atlántico de Arte Moderno (CAAM), Las Palmas de Gran Canaria, Spain
- „Jahresgaben“, Kunstverein München (Open Studios), ISCP, New York, USA
- „We are pleased to invite you #4“, Carlos Carvalho Arte Contemporanea, Lisbon, Portugal

2013

- „Flashes and Fiction“, Galerie Stefan Vogdt, Munich, Germany
- „Jahresgaben“, Kunstverein München, Munich, Germany
- „Neue Münchner Malerei V“, Galerie der Moderne, Stefan Vogdt, Munich, Germany
- „We are pleased to invite you #3“, Carlos Carvalho Arte Contemporanea, Lisbon, Portugal

2012

- „Line and Plane“, Mc Kenzie Fine Art, New York, USA
- „Summer in the City“, Martin Asbæk Gallery, Copenhagen, Denmark
- „We are pleased to invite you #2“, Carlos Carvalho Arte Contemporanea, Lisbon, Portugal
- „Small Business“ Galerie Ebbers, Kranenburg, Germany
- „Jahresausstellung“, Stefan Vogdt – Galerie der Moderne, Munich, Germany

2011

- „Edge of Light“, Galeria Manuel Ojeda, Las Palmas de Gran Canaria, Spain
- „Bilder des Jahres“, Kunstverein Ravensburg, Germany
- „La Colección del CCA“, CCA Andraxt Kunsthalle, Mallorca, Spain
- „A Romance of Many Dimensions“ Brooklyn Artist's Gym, New York, USA
- „Summer in the City“, Martin Asbæk Gallery, Copenhagen, Denmark
- „We are pleased to invite you“, Carlos Carvalho Arte Contemporanea, Lisbon, Portugal
- „New Munich Painting III“ Stefan Vogdt – Galerie der Moderne, Munich, Germany
- „How to Paint“, Katholische Akademie, Munich, Germany
- „Talente“, Galerie Royal, Munich, Germany
- „Save Japan“ Benefit Show, art-report showroom, Munich, Germany

2010

- „Oceans“, Carlos Carvalho Arte Contemporanea, Lisbon, Portugal
- „Grand Tour“, ars agenda, Munich, Germany
- „Hard Candies“, Galerie Ebbers, Kranenburg, Germany
- „Richard Schur – Hard Edge Paintings“, Alpine, Graz, Austria
- „Summer in the City“, Martin Asbæk Gallery, Copenhagen, Denmark
- „Sugarbabies II“ Galerie Ebbers, Kranenburg, Germany
- „100 Meisterwerke“, Galerie Royal, Munich, Germany

2009

- „Islands“, ars agenda, Munich, Germany
- „ARCO '09“, Madrid: solo at Galeria Manuel Ojeda, Madrid, Spain
- „Transformal“, Pharmaka, Los Angeles, USA
- „Revue“, Pinakothek der Moderne, Munich, Germany
- „Building Rooms“ Carlos Carvalho Arte Contemporanea, Lisbon, Portugal
- „Trans“, Meridian Gallery, San Francisco, USA
- „Venus & Mars“, Weltraum, Munich, Germany
- „Sugar Babies“ Galerie Ebbers, Kranenburg, Germany
- „Weltraum – Jahresrückblick“, Städtische Kunsthalle Lothringer 13, Munich, Germany

2008

- „Shadows“, Galeria Manuel Ojeda, Las Palmas de Gran Canaria, Spain
- „Echoes“, Kunstverein Ravensburg, Germany Galerie am Bergkerk, Deventer, Netherlands
- „Merger“, Rocket Gallery, London, United Kingdom
- „Forever Young“, ars agenda, Munich, Germany
- „Versos“, Galeria Manuel Ojeda, Las Palmas de Gran Canaria, Spain
- „Opening“, ars agenda, Munich, Germany
- „Mittelbau“, Verein für Originalradierung, Munich, Germany

2007

- „Space Pool“, Galerie Claus Semerak, Munich, Germany
- „Malerei“, Galerie Ebbers, Kranenburg, Germany
- „TRANS: Abstraction“, Weltraum, Munich, Germany
- „X-tra“, Galerie Claus Semerak, Munich, Germany
- „Der Prof. Winkler Romantik Award“, Atelier Hackel/Seitz, Munich, Germany

2006

- „Bayerischer Kunstförderpreis“, Galerie der Künstler, Munich, Germany
- „The Suitcase Show“, Bus Dori Project Space, Tokyo, Japan
- „Farbe bei sich“, Galerie Claus Semerak, Munich, Germany
- „Das Herr Winkelmann-Stipendium“, Atelier Hackel/Seitz, Munich, Germany

2005

- „Neueste Deutsche Abstraktion“, Städtische Artothek, Munich, Germany
- „Universal Painting“, Guangdong Museum of Art, Guangzhou, China
- „Universal Painting“, Duolun Museum Shanghai, Shanghai, China
- „Universal Painting“, White Space Gallery, Peking, China
- „Universal Painting“, Institute of Fine Arts, Wuhan, China
- „Munich School?“, Museum Katharinenhof, Kranenburg, Germany
- „Visual Issues“, Städtische Galerie Traunstein, Germany
- „All about Domagkstrasse“, Whitebox, Munich, Germany
- „Account“, Galerie Ebbers, Kranenburg, Germany

2004

- „Frische Farbe!“, Galerie Bodenseekreis, Meersburg, Germany
- „Munich School?“, Kunstverein Aichach, Germany
- „Und im Winde klirren die Fahnen“, Galerie Ben Kaufmann, Munich, Germany

2003

- „Junge Münchner Künstler“, Storms Galerie, Munich, Germany
- „213“, Domagkateliers Munich, Germany

2002

- „Of Course“, Galerie der Künstler, Munich, Germany
- „Un/gemalte Bilder“, KVD Galerie Dachau, Germany
- „Gemischtes Doppel“, Akademie der Bildenden Künste Munich, Munich, Germany

2001

- „Bilder zur grauen Saison“, Städtische Artothek Munich, Munich, Germany

2000

- „Ins“, Haus der Kunst, München, Kunstverein Landshut, Germany

== Bibliography ==
- Richard Schur, Grüner Katalog, icon Verlag Hubert Kretschmer Munich 2008, ISBN 978-3-923205-35-6
- Richard Schur, Weißer Katalog, icon Verlag Hubert Kretschmer Munich 2007, ISBN 978-3-928804-61-5
- Universal Painting, Guangdong Museum of Art, Klaus Ebbers, Jerry Zeniuk, Andrea Dippel 2005, ISBN 7-5394-1691-2
- Frische Farbe!, Gessler Robert Verlag Friedrichshafen 2004, ISBN 3-86136-093-4
