= Alexander Laner =

Alexander Laner (born 1974 Munich) is a German artist.

In 1991–1993, he trained as a painter and creator of neon advertising. In 1993–1996, he trained as stonemason. In 1997–2004, he studied at the Academy of Fine Arts, Munich with Olaf Metzel. He lives and works in Munich.

== Awards ==
- 2004 Lothar Späth Prize of the Stiftung Kunstakademie Munich
- 2005 Villa Romana prize
- 2005 Förderpreis of the City of Munich
- 2011 Bayerischer Kunstförderpreis
- 2017 Arbeitsstipendium des Kunstfonds

== Exhibitions ==
2009

- Sassa Trulzsch, Berlin

2008

- 07.12.08–22.03.09 Heavy Metal. Die unerklärbare Leichtigkeit eines Materials Kunsthalle Kiel
- 26.09.08–25.10.08 ready made today Galerie Steinle, München
- 23.02.08–20.04.08 Merkwürdige Maschinen Kunstverein Wolfsburg

2007

- 24.05.07–26.08.07 Made in Germany Kestner Gesellschaft, Hannover
- 12.01.07–10.02.07 HÜBEN WIE DRÜBEN Galleri Tom Christoffersen, Kopenhagen

2006

- 09.09.06–13.10.06 Debutanten Galerie der Künstler, München
- 22.07.06–03.09.06 Hermann-Götz-Preis 2006 Künstlerhaus Marktoberdorf
- 02.06.06–30.06.06 Robert Klümpen / Alexander Laner Galerie Peter Tedden, Düsseldorf
- 04.05.06–21.07.06 Serve and Volley Häusler Contemporary München
- 07.02.06–11.03.06 YBA – Young Bavarian Art Gagosian Gallery Berlin

2005

- "SayNoProduction. part II“, Galerie Klüser 2, Munich
- Rote Zelle, Munich
- "Neue Heimat“, Rathausgalerie, Munich
- "Förderpreise“, Lothringerhalle 13, Munich

2004

- "Love it or Leave it“, Cetinski Biennale, Monte Negro
- "Villa Romana-Preisträger“, Von der Heydt Museum Wuppertal
- "Klotzen und Kleckern“, Mixküche, Munich
- Debütantenausstellung Akademie der Bildenden Künste, Munich

2003

- "Viva Las Vegas“, Ponybar, Berlin
- Jahresgaben Kunstverein Munich

2002

- "Oltre il giardino“, Rimini

2001

- "Helga und Goldankauf“, Kunstraum Munich

2000

- "Left a good job in the city“, CARE OF, Milano
- Jahresausstellung Haus der Kunst, Munich

1999

- "Schöpfung“, Diözesanmuseum Freising
- "Gâre au Voyage“, Fribourg/Switzerland
