= Vasko Vasilev =

Bulgarian violinist and conductor (born 1970)

- Born: 14 October 1970 (age 55); Sofia, Bulgaria
- Genres: classical music, pop music
- Occupation: musician
- Instrument: violin
- Years active: (1975 – present)
- Website: vaskovassilev.com

Vasko Vassilev (Bulgarian: Васко Василев; born October 14, 1970, in Sofia, Bulgaria) is a Bulgarian violinist and conductor.

== Early career ==
At the age of eight Vasilev gave his first public appearance and released his first record with the Sofia Philharmonic Orchestra. Two years later, at the age of 10, he began his studies on a Bulgarian government grant at the Moscow Central Music School, a junior department of the Moscow Conservatory. In 1987 he was awarded second prize in the Marguerite Long–Jacques Thibaud Competition, and in 1989 he won second prize in the Paganini competition (the first prize was not awarded that year). Vivi Vassileva is his sister.

== Later career ==
In 1994 Vasilev joined the Royal Opera House in London as its youngest ever concertmaster. In 2005 he made his conducting debut at the Royal Albert Hall in London. Five years later he published an autobiography, Vasko @ 40, and in 2011 he became a judge on the Bulgarian reality television show X Factor. In 2023 he led the orchestra, under the direction of Antonio Pappano, at the coronation of Charles III and Camilla.

Vasilev has worked with artists such as Plácido Domingo, Sting, The Rolling Stones, Vanessa-Mae and Lili Ivanova. He also gives masterclasses to violinists at the Royal College of Music, Trinity College of Music and at the Conservatory of Music in Spain.
