= Nikolai Vogel =

German writer (born 1971)

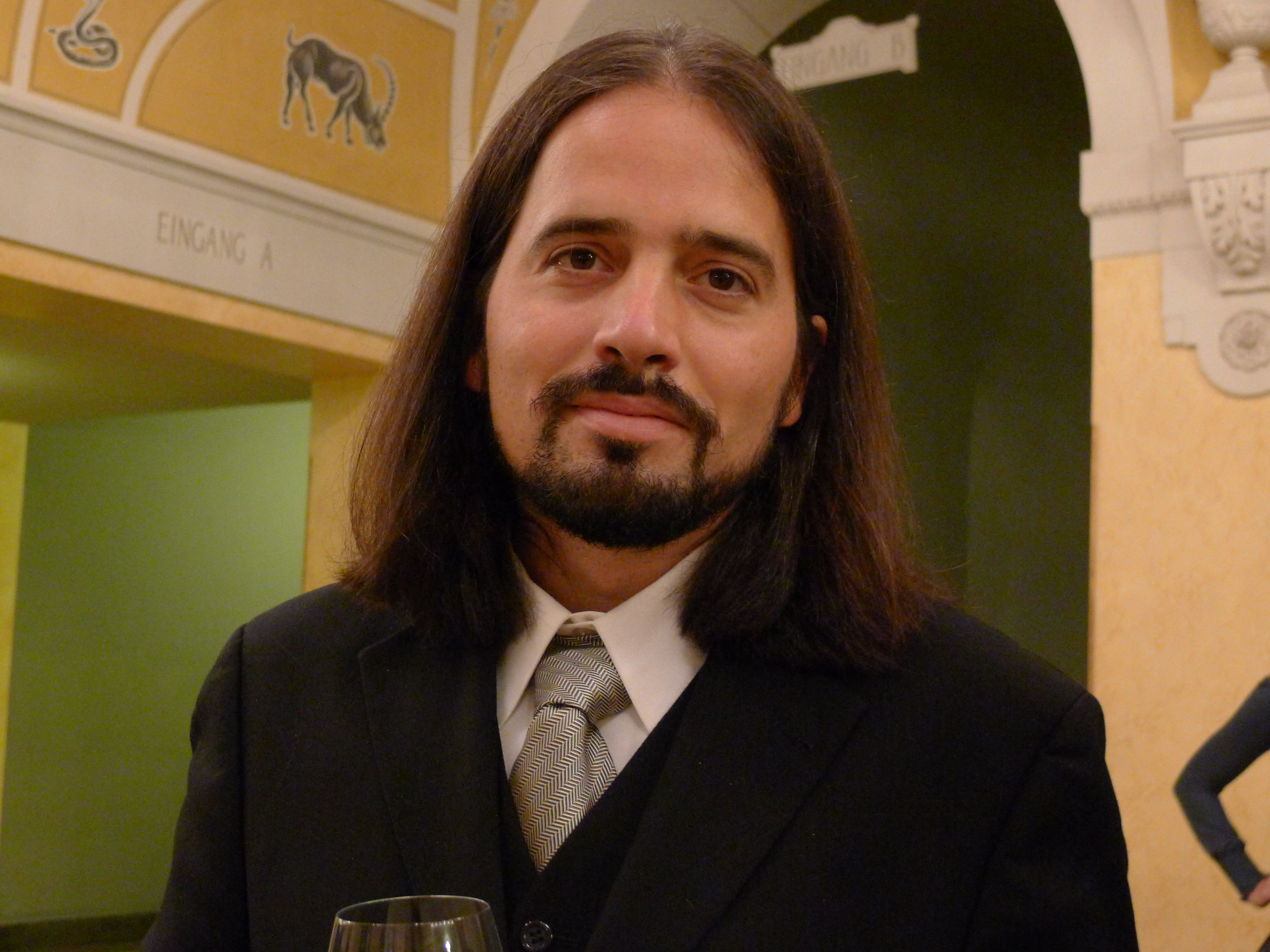
Nikolai Vogel

Nikolai Vogel (born 10 January 1971 in Munich) is a German writer.

== Biography ==
Nikolai Vogel was born in 1971 in Munich. He attended school in Landsberg am Lech. He studied German literature, philosophy and computer science at LMU Munich. Subsequently, he worked as a Web developer and writer. In 1993, he founded the start-up publishing house Black Ink Verlag together with Kilian Fitzpatrick. From 1996 to 2000, Vogel and Fitzpatrick organized the See-Lesungen (Readings on the Lake) at the Kleinhesseloher See in the Englischer Garten of Munich. In 2004, Vogel participated at the Open Mike of Berlin and the Ingeborg Bachmann Prize in Klagenfurt, Austria.

In 1997 Nikolai Vogel was awarded the Kulturförderpreis des Landkreises Landsberg/Lech and in 2007 he received the literary prize Bayerischer Kunstförderpreis.

== Works ==
- Und andere Untiefen, Scheuring 1993 (with Kilian Fitzpatrick and Christoph Schäferle)
- Plot, Scheuring 1995 (with Kilian Fitzpatrick)
- E. T. A. Hoffmanns Erzählung "Der Sandmann" als Interpretation der Interpretation, Frankfurt am Main 1998
- Mißlungene Texte, Scheuring 1998
- Qually, Scheuring 2000/2004
- Wandlung, Scheuring, 2000
- Welt II, Scheuring 2000 (with Kilian Fitzpatrick)
- Zwei Wochen, Scheuring 2002 (with Kilian Fitzpatrick)
- Der König schläft im Schloss, Scheuring 2007 (with Thomas Glatz and Kilian Fitzpatrick)
