= Gregor Mayrhofer =

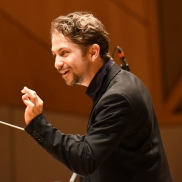
- Mayrhofer in 2019
- Born: 1987 (age 38–39); Munich, Bavaria, West Germany
- Occupations: Conductor; Composer; Pianist

Gregor Amadeus Mayrhofer (born 1987) is a German conductor, pianist and composer.

== Life and career ==
Mayrhofer was born in Munich in 1987 and grew up in Wolfratshausen; his parents were both musicians, and he was the second of their three sons. He received early violin instructions from his father, and took lessons in piano, organ, clarinet and composition from age six. After completing his Abitur he studied composition and conducting at the Musikhochschule München with Jan Müller-Wieland, then at the Conservatoire de Paris with Frédéric Durieux, at the Robert Schumann Hochschule Düsseldorf with Rüdiger Bohn and Manfred Trojahn, and at the Juilliard School in New York City with Alan Gilbert.

In 2015 he became assisting conductor of the Ensemble intercontemporain, making his debut with them at the Philharmonie de Paris in 2016. On a Sir Simon Rattle scholarship of the Karajan Academy, he assisted from 2017 with the Berlin Philharmonic for two years Simon Rattle and guest conductors.

He collaborated as conductor and as composer with the Bavarian State Opera, SWR Symphonieorchester, Münchener Kammerorchester, Münchner Symphoniker, Belgrade Philharmonic Orchestra, Slovenian Philharmonic Orchestra and the Lucerne Festival Academy Orchestra. He conducted Ensemble Ascolta and Ensemble Proton Bern, working with soloists such as Daniil Trifonov, Georg Nigl and Patricia Kopatchinskaja. He conducted the film music of Jim Knopf und die Wilde 13.

Mayrhofer has performed with his brother Raphael as the jazz duo Imbrothersation; they were awarded the Tassilo Award of the Süddeutsche Zeitung.

In 2023 Mayrhofer was awarded the Opus Klassik in the categories Composer of the Year, "Newcomer of the Year" as conductor; in addition, his Recycling Concerto was nominated for the innovation prize for sustainability, as well as for the categories videoclip, support of young artists (Nachwuchsförderung) and innovative concert.

== Awards ==
- 2006: First prize Jugend musiziert national competition, with Maria Well
- 2008: Tassilo Award of the Süddeutsche Zeitung (Jazzduo Imbrothersation)
- 2017: Charles Schiff Conducting Award
- 2018: Bayerischer Kunstförderpreis
