= Nürnberger Nachrichten =

German newspaper in Franconia

- Type: Regional daily newspaper
- Owner(s): Bärbel Schnell, Sabine Schnell-Pleyer
- Publisher: Verlag Nürnberger Presse Druckhaus Nürnberg GmbH & Co. KG (Deutschland)
- Editor-in-chief: Michael Husarek
- Editor: Bruno Schnell †
- Founded: 11 October 1945
- Language: German
- Headquarters: Nuremberg
- Circulation: 178.925
- Website: www.nn.de

The Nürnberger Nachrichten (NN) was originally a local daily in the Nuremberg-Erlangen-Fürth area. With its regional editions, it covers the whole of Middle Franconia and parts of Upper Franconia and the Upper Palatinate and is one of Germany's large regional newspapers. The Nürnberger Zeitung belongs to the same group but is editorially independent.

== History and profile ==
The Nürnberger Nachrichten (NN) was first published on 11 October 1945. Its founder, Joseph E. Drexel, was granted licence No. 3 for newspaper publication by the occupying power, the American Military Government in Bavaria. At first, the NN was printed in Zirndorf because it was not possible to find an intact printing plant in Nuremberg, owing to the war damage. In 1945/46 the paper only came out twice a week; from Autumn 1946 to 1949 that increased to three times a week, and subsequently, four times a week. In Autumn 1949, the publishers moved to Nuremberg. It was not until 16 November 1962 that the paper came out six times a week.

The newspaper is published in tabloid format.

== Circulation ==
In 2001 Nürnberger Nachrichten had a circulation of 325,000 copies. Its circulation was 315,000 copies in 2003. The circulation of the paper was 294,694 copies in the first quarter of 2006.
