= Felix Klieser =

German hornist (born 1991)

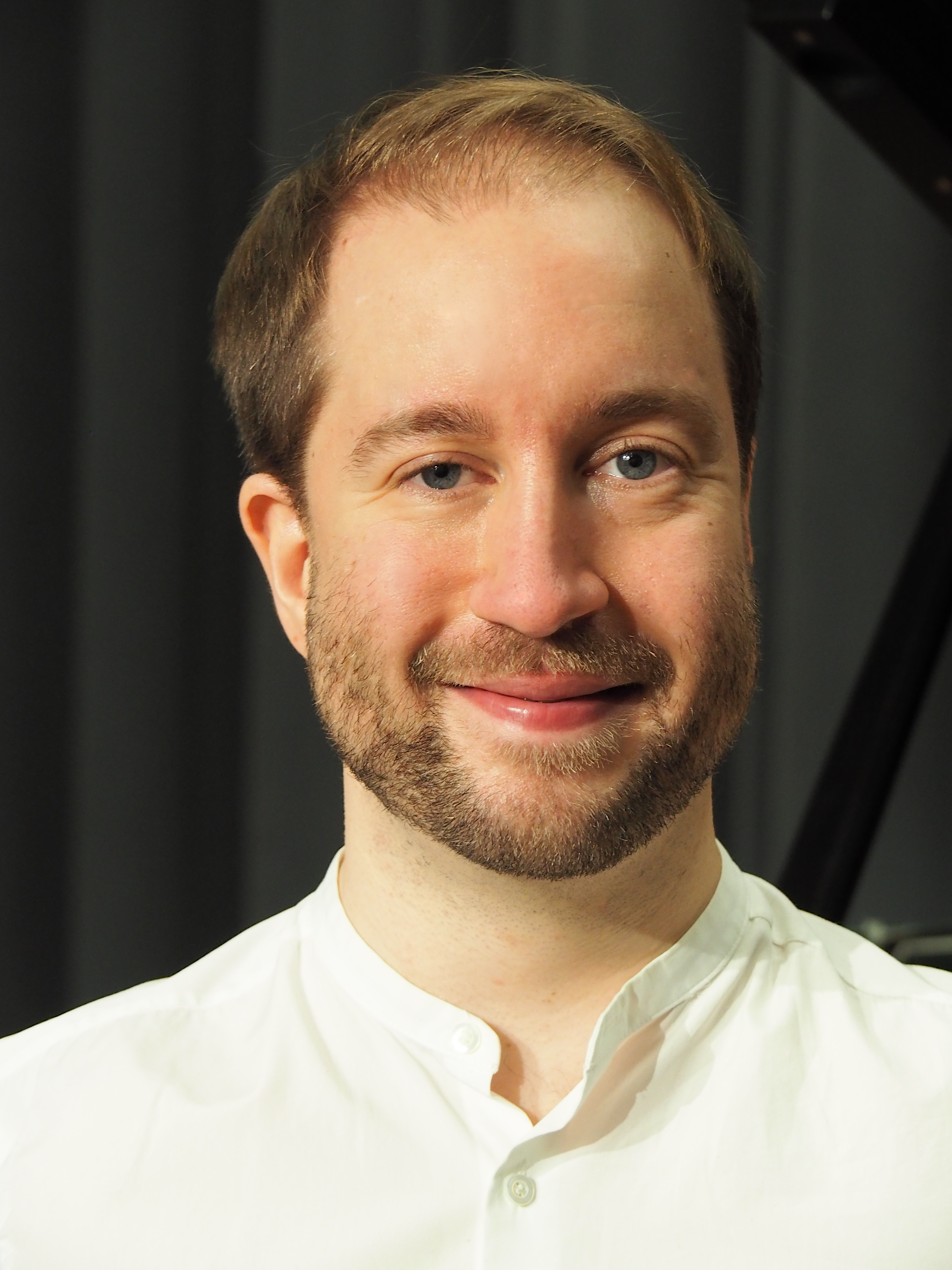
- Klieser in 2020

Background information
- Born: 3 January 1991 (age 35); Göttingen, Germany
- Genres: Classical
- Instrument: French horn
- Website: felixklieser.de

Felix Klieser (born 3 January 1991) is a German professional player of the French horn. He was born without arms. He plays the horn by using the toes of his left foot to operate the valves. The horn is held on a tripod. He does not place a limb inside the bell of the horn, in contrast to the way the instrument is traditionally played, using the left hand to operate the valves and placing the right hand inside the bell.

Born in Göttingen, he began playing the horn at the age of 4. He studied at the Hochschule für Musik, Theater und Medien Hannover. In 2016 he received the Leonard Bernstein Award.

== BBC Proms ==
In August 2023 Klieser made his debut at the BBC Proms, with the Bournemouth Symphony Orchestra and conductor Kirill Karabits, performing Mozart's Horn Concerto No. 4.

In August 2026 he returned to the Proms to perform Mozart's Horn Concerto No. 3, with the Academy of St Martin in the Fields, adding "'O sole mio" as an encore.

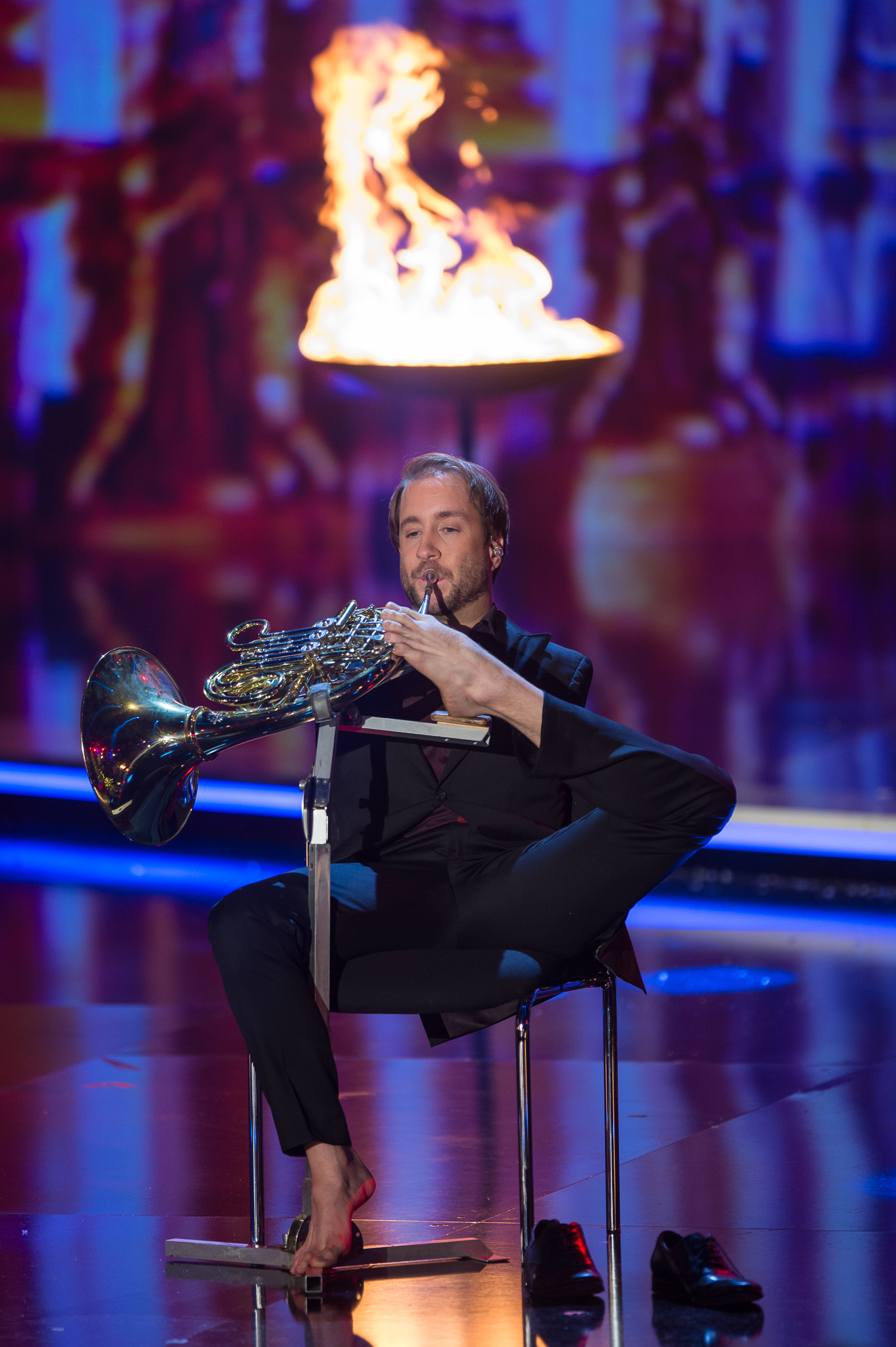
Felix Klieser (2017)
