= Leonard Bernstein Award =

German music award

The Leonard Bernstein Award is a German music award endowed with 10,000 euros (since 2026: 20,000 euros). Since 2002, the award has been sponsored by the Sparkassen-Finanzgruppe as part of the Schleswig-Holstein Musik Festival. The prize is awarded to talented classical musicians to give them support for an international career. The jury includes children of Leonard Bernstein, Zarin Mehta (2015), the conductor Christoph Eschenbach and the Intendant of the Schleswig-Holstein Musik Festival Christian Kuhnt.

== Recipients ==
- 2002 Lang Lang
- 2003 Lisa Batiashvili
- 2004 Erik Schumann
- 2005 Jonathan Biss
- 2006 Alisa Weilerstein
- 2007 Martin Grubinger
- 2008 Anna Vinnitskaya
- 2009 Leonard Elschenbroich
- 2010 Kit Armstrong
- 2011 David Aaron Carpenter
- 2012 Cameron Carpenter
- 2013 Jan Lisiecki
- 2014 Christopher Park
- 2015 Krzysztof Urbański
- 2016 Felix Klieser
- 2017 Kian Soltani
- 2018 Charles Yang
- 2019 Emily D'Angelo
- 2020 Stathis Karapanos
- 2021 Isata Kanneh-Mason
- 2022 Sean Shibe
- 2023 Vivi Vassileva
- 2024 Anastasia Kobekina
- 2025 Hayato Sumino
- 2026 Lucienne Renaudin Vary
