= Roope Gröndahl =

Finnish pianist

Roope Gröndahl (born in Helsinki, 1989) is a Finnish pianist trained at the Sibelius Academy under Matti Raekallio and Liisa Pohjola.

== Competition Record ==
- 2007 Helsinki Maj Lind IPC - 2nd prize
- 2008 Eurovision Young Musicians - 2nd prize

== More information ==
- Profile on Comusico
- KlangKultTour 2009
