= Susanne (given name) =

- Gender: Feminine

Origin
- Region of origin: Germany and Scandinavia

Other names
- Alternative spelling: Susann
- Variant form: Suzanne
- Related names: Susanna

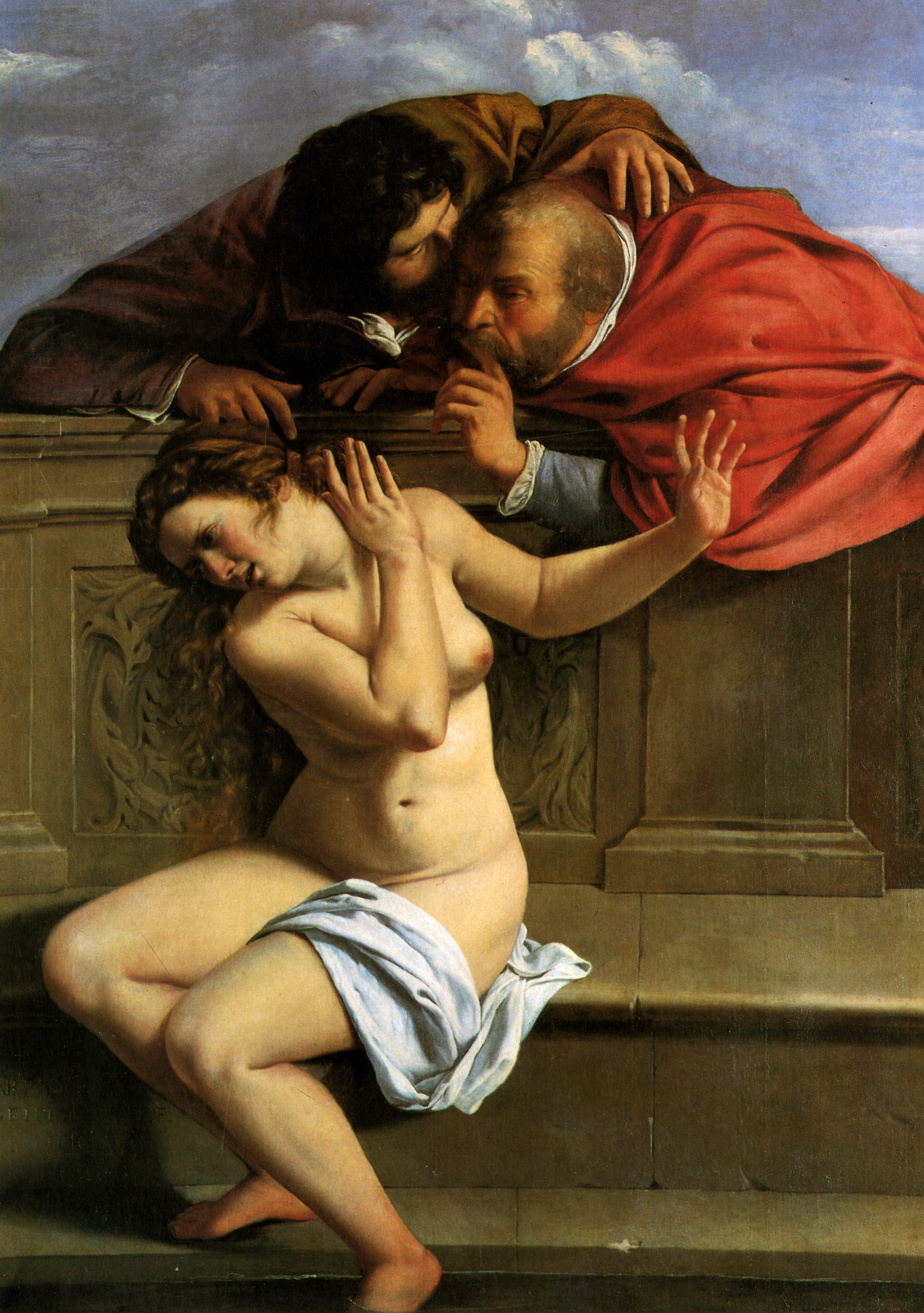
Susanna and the Elders

Susanne is a feminine given name. It is a German and Scandinavian form of Susanna, with Susann and Suzanne as variants.

Notable persons with the given name Susanne include:

== A ==
- Susanne Aalto (born 1964), Swedish astronomer
- Susanne Abbuehl (born 1970), Swiss-Dutch jazz singer and composer
- Susanne Åkesson (born 1964), Swedish migration expert
- Susanne Albers (born 1965), German theoretical computer scientist
- Susanne Albrecht (born 1951), former member of the Red Army Faction
- Susanne Alfvengren (born 1959), Swedish singer
- Susanne Alt (born 1978), German jazz saxophone player and composer
- Susanne Amatosero (born 1952), German writer
- Susanne Antonetta (born 1956), American poet and author
- Susanne Augustesen (born 1956), Danish footballer
- Susanne Ayoub (born 1956), Austrian-Iraqi writer, journalist and filmmaker

== B ==
- Susanne Bartsch (born 1951), Swiss event producer
- Susanne Bauckholt (born 1965), German sailor
- Susanne Baumann (born 1961), German diplomat
- Susanne Benton (born 1948), Canadian actress
- Susanne Berckhemer (born 1978), German actress
- Susanne Beyer (born 1961), German high jumper
- Susanne Beyer (born 1969), German journalist and author
- Susanne Bier (born 1960), Danish film producer, director and writer
- Susanne Blakeslee (born 1956), American voice actress
- Susanne Bobzien (born 1960), German-born British philosopher
- Susanne Bødker (born 1956), Danish computer scientist
- Susanne Boidin (born 1987), Danish sailor
- Susanne Börner (born 1980), German archaeologist and numismatist
- Susanne Brenner, American mathematician
- Susanne Busch (born 1970), German speed skater

== C ==
- Susanne Ceder (born 1967), Swedish ice hockey player
- Susanne Celik (born 1994), Swedish tennis player
- Susanne Clausen, German artist, curator and professor
- Susanne Craig (born 1968), Canadian journalist
- Susanne Cramer (1936–1969), German actress
- Susanne Crane (born 1966), American artist
- Susanne Cummings (1930–2016), German-American actress
- Susanne Cummings (born 1962), American heiress

== D ==
- Susanne Dandenault, Canadian weightlifter
- Susanne Daniels, American entertainment executive
- Susanne Daubner (born 1961), German news and television presenter
- Susanne Dessoir (1869–1953), German soprano
- Susanne Dierolf (1942–2009), German mathematician
- Susanne Ditlevsen, Danish mathematician and statistician
- Susanne Dodillet (born 1977), Swedish feminist

== E ==
- Susanne Eberle-Strub (born 1960), Liechtensteiner politician
- Susanne Eberstein (born 1948), Swedish politician
- Susanne Eilersen (born 1964), Danish politician
- Susanne Eisenmann (born 1964), German politician
- Susanne Ekman (born 1978), Swedish alpine
- Susanne Charlotte Engelmann (1886–1963), German professor
- Susanne Engstrøm (born 1949), Danish pharmaconomist
- Susanne Erbers, German canoeist
- Susanne Erding-Swiridoff (born 1955), German composer and curator
- Susanne Erichsen (1925–2002), German model and entrepreneur
- Susanne Erlandsson, Swedish footballer

== F ==
- Susanne Fellner (born 1985), German ice hockey player
- Susanne Ferschl (born 1973), German politician
- Susanne Fontaine (born 1961), German musicologist
- Susanne Fries-Gaier (born 1968), German diplomat
- Susanne Fröhlich (born 1962), German author and journalist
- Susanne Fuhr (born 1953), Norwegian jazz musician
- Susanne Fürst (born 1969), Austrian politician

== G ==
- Susanne Gaschke (born 1967), German journalist and politician
- Susanne Georgi (born 1976), Danish singer
- Susanne Gervay, Australian author
- Susanne Gether (1857–1943), Danish–New Zealand woodcarver
- Susanne Glesnes (born 1974), Norwegian beach volleyball player
- Susanne Gogl-Walli (born 1996), Austrian sprinter
- Susanne Graf (born 1992), German politician
- Susanne Grainger (born 1990), Canadian rower
- Susanne Graversen (born 1984), Danish footballer
- Susanne Grinder (born 1981), Danish ballet dancer
- Susanne Groom (1945–2023), British historian and author
- Susanne Gubler (born 1965), Swiss footballer
- Susanne Gunnarsson (born 1963), Swedish canoeist
- Susanne Gynning-Ödling (born 1950), Swedish curler

== H ==
- Susanne Haaland (born 1998), Norwegian footballer
- Susanne Hahn (born 1978), German long-distance runner
- Susanne Hambrusch, Austrian-American computer scientist
- Susanne Hannestad (born 1961), Norwegian handball player
- Susanne Hart (1927– 2010), South African veterinarian
- Susanne Hartel (born 1988), German footballer
- Susanne Haworth, Australian producer and actress
- Susanne Hedberg (born 1972), Swedish footballer
- Susanne Heim, German political scientist and historian
- Susanne Hennig-Wellsow (born 1977), German politician
- Susanne Hierl (born 1973), German politician
- Susanne Hilger (born 1958), East German swimmer
- Susanne Hirt (born 1973), German canoeist
- Susanne B. Hirt (1913–2006), American physical therapy professor
- Susanne Hirzel (1921– 2012), German resistance activist
- Susanne Hoffman (born 1994), Austrian biathlete
- Susanne Holmström (born 1947), Danish sociologist
- Susanne Hoss (born 1968), German actress
- Susanne Hou (born 1977), Canadian violinist
- Susanne Humphrey (c.1944–2019), American medical librarian

== J ==
- Susanne E. Jalbert (born 1951), American activist
- Susanne Jensen (born 1963), German artist and actor
- Susanne Jørgensen, Danish cricketer
- Susanne Jung (born 1963), East German javelin thrower
- Susanne Juranek (born 1975), German cyclist

== K ==
- Susanne Kappeler (born 1949), Lecturer in English at University of East Anglia
- Susanne Karstedt, German criminologist
- Susanne Kasperczyk (born 1985), German footballer
- Susanne Kastner (born 1946), German politician
- Susanne Kastrup Forslund (born 1983), Danish handball player
- Susanne Kearsley (born 1966), Canadian writer
- Susanne Keil (born 1978), German hammer thrower
- Susanne Kessler (born 1955), German–Italian painter, illustrator and installation artist
- Susanne Klatten (born 1962), German heiress
- Susanne Kiermayer (born 1968), German sport shooter
- Susanne Kippenberger (born 1957), German journalist and author
- Susanne Kirchmayr (born 1965), Austrian music producer, DJ and feminist
- Susanne Koelbl, German journalist
- Susanne König (born 1974), German fencer
- Susanne Kord, British scholar
- Susanne Kreher (born 1998), German skeleton racer
- Susanne Kriemann (born 1972), German artist and university professor
- Susanne Kuehling, Canadian anthropologist
- Susanne Küchler, German anthropologist
- Susanne Kühn (born 1969), German painter

== L ==
- Susanne Lahme (born 1968), German volleyball player
- Susanne Lanefelt (born 1946), Swedish health expert
- Susanne Langer (1895–1985), American philosopher
- Susanne Laschet (born 1962), First Lady of North Rhine-Westphalia
- Susanne Lautenbacher (1932–2020), German violinist
- Susanne le Pelley (1668–1733), 10th Seigneur and first Dame of Sark
- Susanne Lebek (born 1986), German dressage rider
- Susanne Leutenegger Oberholzer (born 1948), Swiss politician
- Susanne Lewis, German American musician, songwriter and artist
- Susanne Lindberg (1871–1934), Danish cyclist
- Susanne Link, German swimmer
- Susanne Linke (born 1944), German dancer and choreographer
- Susanne Lorentzon (born 1961), Swedish high jumper
- Susanne Losch (born 1966), German hurdler
- Susanne Lothar (1960–2012), German actress
- Susanne Luchsinger, Swiss curler and coach
- Susanne Lundeng (born 1969), Norwegian traditional folk musician and composer
- Susanne Lüscher, Swiss orienteering competitor
- Susanne Lyons (born 1957), American businesswoman

== M ==
- Susanne Manning (born 1982), British singer and radio personality
- Susanne Marsee (born 1941), American mezzo-soprano
- Susanne Maselle, Tanzanian politician
- Susanne McCarthy, English author
- Susanne Melior (born 1958), German biologist and politician
- Susanne Menden-Deuer, Marine scientist
- Susanne Menge (born 1960), German politician
- Susanne Mentzer (born 1957), American operatic mezzo-
- Susanne Meyerhoff (born 1974), Danish sports shooter
- Susanne Maria Michaelis (born 1962), German creole linguist
- Susanne Miller (1915–2008), German author and historian
- Susanne Mittag (born 1958), German politician
- Susanne Moberg (born 1986), Swedish association football player
- Susanne Moll (born 1987), Austrian snowboarder
- Susanne Müller (born 1972), German field hockey player
- Susanne Müller, German swimmer
- Susanne Munch Thore (born 1960), Norwegian lawyer and businesswoman
- Susanne Munk Wilbek (born 1967), Danish handball player

== N ==
- Susanne Niederhauser (born 1970), Austrian bodybuilder
- Susanne Nordström (born 1963), Swedish politician
- Susanne Nyström (born 1982), Swedish cross-country skier

== O ==
- Susanne Osthoff (born 1962), German archaeologist

== P ==
- Susanne Page (1938–2024), American photographer
- Susanne Porsche (born 1952), German film producer and investor
- Susanne Profanter (born 1970), Austrian judoka
- Susanne Puddefoot (1934–2010), English journalist, editor and charity director

== R ==
- Susanne Raab (born 1984), Austrian politician
- Susanne Renner, German botanist
- Susanne Riesch (born 1987), German alpine skier
- Susanne Rottenbacher (born 1969), German artist
- Susanne Rudolph (born 1981), German speed skater
- Susanne Rust, American investigative journalist

== S ==
- Susanne Schädlich (born 1965), German writer and literary translator
- Susanne Schaper (born 1978), German politician
- Susanne Schattenberg (born 1969), German historian
- Susanne Schmid (born 1965), Swiss tennis player
- Susanne Schmidt (born 1974), German rower
- Susanne C. Sedgwick (1931–1988), American lawyer and judge
- Susanne Steinem Patch (1925–2007), American gemologist
- Susanne Stemmer (born 1973), Austrian visual artist
- Susanne Stemmer, Materials scientist and physicist
- Susanne Suba (1913–2012), Hungarian-American artist
- Susan Ann Sulley (born 1963), formerly known as Susanne Sulley, British singer
- Susanne Sundfør (born 1986), Norwegian singer/songwriter
- Susanne Sunesen (born 1977), Danish para-equestrian

== T ==
- Susanne Teschl (born 1971), Austrian biomathematician

== U ==
- Susanne Uhlen (born 1955), German actress
- Susanne Ussing (1940–1998), Danish artist, architect, and ceramicist

== V ==
- Susanne von Klettenberg (1723–1774), German abbess and writer

== W ==
- Susanne Wahlström (born 1973), Swedish politician
- Susanne Wenger (1915–2009), Austrian-Nigerian artist
- Susanne Wetzel, German computer scientist and professor
- Susanne Wiest (born 1967), German activist
- Susanne Wolff, German actress
- Susanne Woods (born 1943), American literary scholar and academic administrator
- Susanne Wuest (born 1979), Austrian actress
- Susanne Wurmbrand, Austrian linguist

== Y ==
- Susanne Yelin (born 1968), German physicist

== Z ==
- Susanne Zenor (born 1947), American actress

== See also ==
- Susan
- Susann
- Susi (disambiguation)
- Susie (disambiguation)
- Susy
- Suzanne (given name)
- Susanna (given name)
- Susannah (given name)
- Suzana
