= Susanne Stemmer =

Susanne Stemmer may refer to:

- Susanne Stemmer (artist)
- Susanne Stemmer (physicist)
