= V-Partei3 =

V-Partei^{3}
- Chairperson: Roland Wegner
- Founded: 30 April 2016
- Headquarters: V-Partei^{3} Bundesgeschäftsstelle; Schönbachstr. 4a 86154 Augsburg
- Membership (2023): 1,200
- Ideology: Animal rights Environmentalism
- Colors: Green
- Bundestag: 0 / 630
- State Parliaments: 0 / 1,821
- European Parliament: 0 / 96

Website
- v-partei.de

V-Partei^{3}, known officially as V-Partei^{3} – Change. Diversity. Vegan. (German: V-Partei^{3} – Veränderung. Vielfalt. Vegan.), is a German political party that was founded in April 2016 in Munich, Bavaria. The principal focus of the party is animal rights and environmentalism. It is the sole political party in Germany devoted to encouraging the adoption of a plant-based diet. The party took part in the North Rhine-Westphalia state elections in 2017, and received 10,013 votes or 0.12% of the vote, far below the 5% threshold required to enter the State Landtag. Notable members of the party were actress Barbara Rütting and Axel Ritt, guitarist of the band Grave Digger, who joined in May 2017.

== Party program ==
In the party manifesto created for the 2017 Bundestag elections focuses on improving animal welfare conditions in Germany and changing existing government policies so that Germany reduces its consumption of meat. The manifesto focuses on 10 key areas, and some are noted below.

=== Animal testing ===
The party opposes the testing of animals and wants to end the practice entirely. The platform instead advocates for cruelty-free medical research, which includes the use of human simulation.

=== Transport policy ===
The party supports projects that increase the use of bicycles, as an eco-friendly way of travelling. V-Partei^{3} also want to introduce speed limits on roads in an attempt to reduce air pollution. Their manifesto advocates a 130 km/h (81 mph) speed limit on highways and general speed limits elsewhere.

=== Energy policy ===
The party want to see an end to nuclear power, a reduction in the number of coal-fired and biogas power plants and greater subsidies for renewable energy, with the aim of reaching 100% renewable in the next few decades.

=== Economic policy ===
The V-Partei^{3} opposes any genetic engineering in agriculture. The party opposes TTIP, which they say softens labour rights and causes climate destruction. They advocate a basic income on the following grounds:

- It must be a living wage.
- There must be an individual entitlement.
- The income must not be means-tested.
- It must be made available without any work obligation.

=== Health policy ===
The V-Partei^{3} supports the legalization of cannabis.

== Election results ==
Election	Chamber	% of vote	Seats won
2017 North Rhine-Westphalia state election	State Landtag	▲0.12%	0
2017 German federal election	Bundestag	▲0.1%	0
2021 German federal election	Bundestag	▼0.1%	0

=== European Parliament ===
Election	List leader	Votes	%	Seats	+/–	EP Group
2024	Simon Klopstock	55,440	0.14 (#25)	0 / 96	New	–
