= Bönninghausen =

Surname

Bönninghausen is a surname. It may refer to:

- Clemens Maria Franz von Bönninghausen (1785–1846), German lawyer
- Hermann von Bönninghausen (1888–1919), German athlete
- Inge von Bönninghausen (born 1938), German journalist
