= Gert Scobel =

German journalist, television moderator, author and philosopher

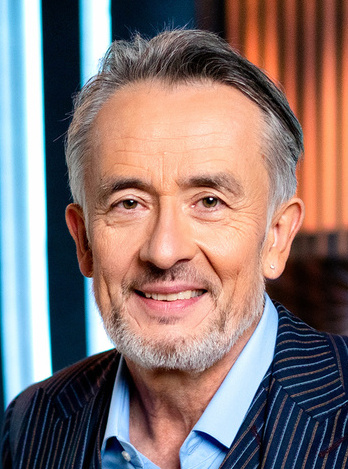
- Scobel in 2022
- Born: 12 May 1959 (age 67); Aachen, North Rhine-Westphalia, West Germany
- Occupations: Journalist; TV moderator; author; philosopher
- Partner: Susanne Fröhlich (until 2008)
- Children: 2
- Awards: Full list

Gert Scobel (born 12 May 1959) is a German journalist, television moderator, author and philosopher.

== Life and career ==
Gert Scobel was born on 12 May 1959 in Aachen.

He studied philosophy and Catholic theology from 1977, first at the Jesuit University St. Georgen in Frankfurt, where he graduated in Catholic theology in 1983, and at the University of California, Berkeley, where he also received a Master of Arts in 1981.

From 1985, Scobel worked as a freelancer for a magazine of the Frankfurter Allgemeine Zeitung as well as for the Hessischer and Westdeutscher Rundfunk (WDR) In 1988 he completed a traineeship at Hessischer Rundfunk. From 1989 Scobel worked as a freelance culture journalist for radio, television and print media and was the author of TV documentaries and features, including some on ethics in business and industry, brain research and artificial intelligence.

Since 1995, right from the start, Scobel was one of the presenters of the daily 3sat program Kulturzeit, from which he left in December 2007. In 1997 he completed an EICOS science scholarship at the Max Planck Institute for neurobiology in Martinsried near Munich. In 1998 he co-founded the 3sat science magazine nano. From 1999 to 2000 he moderated the literary magazine Leselust on WDR.

In 2007, Scobel designed and hosted the philosophy and culture program „nächster Halt“ ("next stop") on KiKa.

Since April 2008, he has presented the weekly program scobel as editor-in-chief and presenter at 3sat. Since 2015, he also moderates the show.

Since 2016, he is a member of the PEN Centre Germany.

Since September 2020 he has moderated the YouTube channel Scobel, on which videos on philosophical topics appear every week. The programs are produced by Zweites Deutsches Fernsehen (ZDF), 3sat and Lens Media Videos.

== Personal life ==
Until 2008, Scobel lived with Susanne Fröhlich, whom he had met during his traineeship at Hessischer Rundfunk. They lived near Frankfurt and have two children.

== Awards and nominations ==
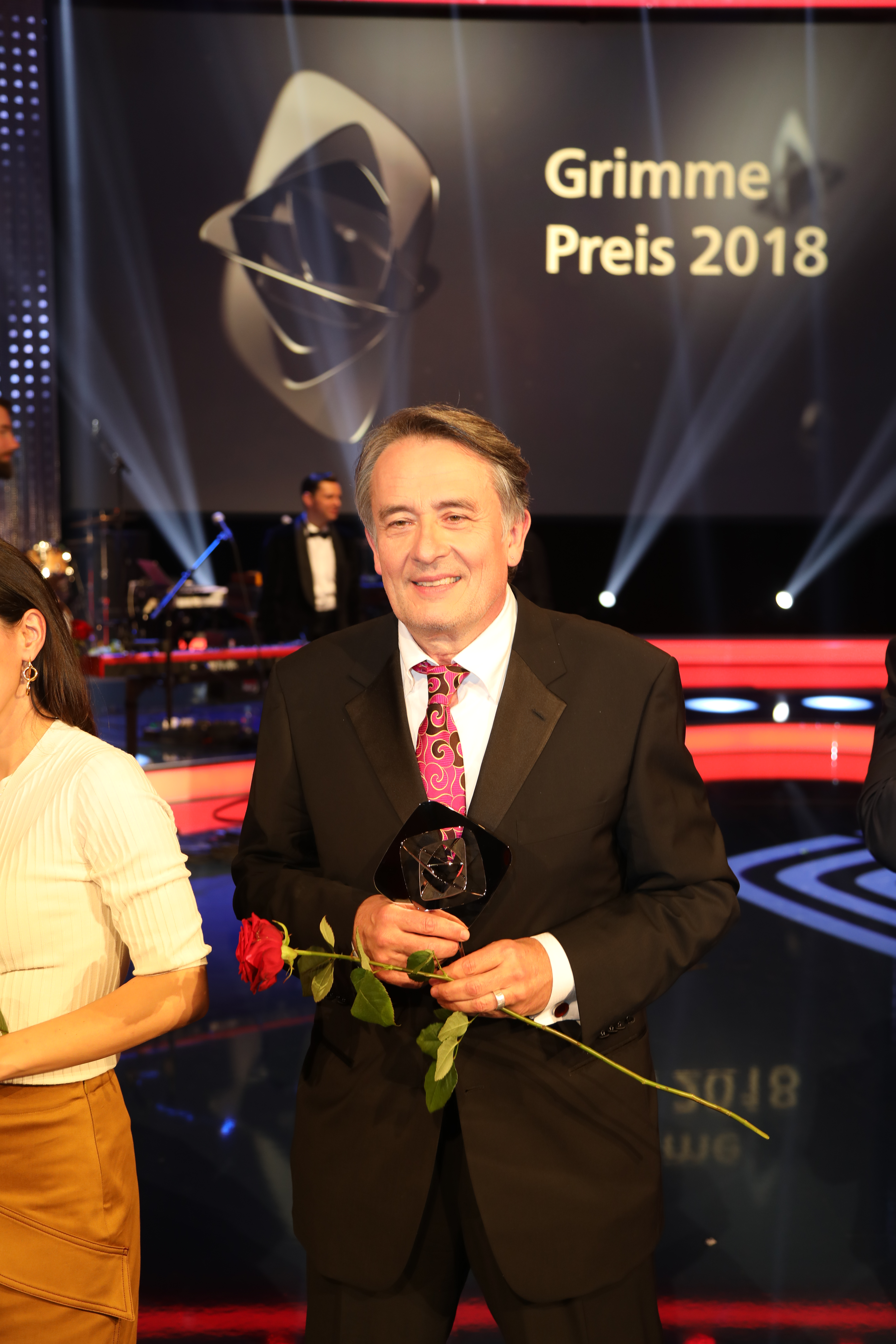
Gert Scobel at the award ceremony of the Grimme-Preis in 2018

- 1998: Deutscher Fernsehpreis and Grimme-Preis nomination in the category "spezial" for the moderation of "Kulturzeit"
- 2001: Bayerischer Fernsehpreis for the moderation of Kulturzeit and delta and nomination for the Adolf-Grimme-Preis spezial
- 2004: nomination for the Grimme-Preis 2004
- 2005: Grimme-Preis of the Kategorie "spezial" for the moderation of Kulturzeit and moderation and editorial staff of delta
- 2006: „Kulturjournalisten des Jahres“ of the Medium Magazin
- 2007: Together with Lutz Hachmeister nomination for the Deutscher Fernsehpreis for the documentary film "Ich – Marcel Reich-Ranicki"
- 2018: Besondere Ehrung (Special Honor) of the Deutscher Volkshochschul-Verband, together with Inge von Bönninghausen and Armin Wolf, awarded during the 54th Grimme-Preis and Preis für Wissenschaftspublizistik (price for science journalism) (2018) of the Deutsche Gesellschaft für Psychologie
- 2019: Lorenz-Oken-Medaille of the Gesellschaft Deutscher Naturforscher und Ärzte

== Works ==
=== Articles ===
- Zwischen Kant und Kamera. In: Cicero (2009).

=== Books ===
- Die Plühms bekommen ein Baby, Coautor mit Tochter Charlotte Fröhlich, Bloomsbury 2007, ISBN 978-3827052681.
- Weisheit: Über das, was uns fehlt. DuMont Literatur und Kunst Verlag, Köln 2008, ISBN 978-3-8321-8016-4.
- Wie Niklas ins Herz der Welt geriet, Berlin Verlag, 2008, ISBN 978-3827053190.
- Der Ausweg aus dem Fliegenglas: Wie wir Glauben und Vernunft in Einklang bringen können. Fischer, Frankfurt 2010, ISBN 978-3-10-070214-2.
- Warum wir philosophieren müssen. Die Erfahrung des Denkens. S. Fischer Verlag, Frankfurt am Main 2012, ISBN 978-3-10-070215-9.
- Der fliegende Teppich. Eine Diagnose der Moderne. Fischer Taschenbuch, Frankfurt am Main 2017, ISBN 978-3-596-03689-9.
- NichtDenken. Achtsamkeit und die Transformation von Körper, Geist und Gesellschaft. Nicolaische Buchhandlung, NP&I, Berlin 2018. ISBN 978-3-96476-012-8.

=== Movies ===
- Documentary film Ich, Reich-Ranicki (together with Lutz Hachmeister) (2007)
