= Mein Grundeinkommen =

German registered association

Logo

Mein Grundeinkommen (My Basic Income) is a German non-profit registered association that is committed to spreading the idea of unconditional basic income in Germany and researching it.

The main activities include drawing lots for a one-year basic income, campaigns, educational events and collaborations on basic income, as well as own research activities.

The association is fully financed through donations and crowdfunding.

== History ==
Mein Grundeinkommen was founded by Michael Bohmeyer in 2014.

In the summer of 2014, a total of four one-year basic incomes of 12,000 euros each were collected for the first time in a crowdfunding campaign. The initiator of the campaign, Michael Bohmeyer, then founded the non-profit association Mein Grundeinkommen e. V., which regularly awards donation-based basic incomes.

The recipients are determined by a public lottery. As of June 2021, the association has raffled over 800 basic incomes, which were transferred to the winners in the form of 1,000 euros per month for one year. About half of the recipients publish their experiences in a blog on the club's website and in the media.

In 2020, the association initiated a basic income pilot project for which more than one and a half million people applied. The project financed by donations, supported by the German Institute for Economic Research, is intended to pay out at least 120 people 1,200 euro per month for three years.

In August 2023, Mein Grundeinkommen calculated a tax-financed universal basic income of €1,200 per month could be financed for every adult in Germany that would make 80% of adults better off.

== Literature ==
- 2019: Michael Bohmeyer and Claudia Cornelsen: Was würdest Du tun? Wie uns das Bedingungslose Grundeinkommen verändert, Econ Verlag 2019, ISBN 3430210070
