= Carsten-Pieter Zimmermann =

Austrian news anchor

Carsten-Pieter Zimmermann (born March 26, 1978, in Vienna) is an Austrian news anchor and media expert. He is known through his work at the TV station PULS 4 (former Puls TV) and Forbes Magazine.

== Career ==
In 2006 Zimmermann, started presenting the news as a journalist at Puls TV, after being a newscaster at Radio Max and training at the Austrian Broadcasting Corporation ORF and the University of California, Los Angeles (UCLA) (Professional Program In Producing an der School Of Theater, Film And Television).

In 2012, he continued at the primetime show AustriaNews (PULS 4 News) at ProSieben Austria, Sat.1 Österreich and the Café Puls morning show.

After publishing articles for Forbes Magazine for some time he became Head Of News krone.tv for the most influential Austrian news paper Kronen Zeitung in 2021.

== Personal life ==
Carsten-Pieter Zimmermann is the brother of Marie-Claire Zimmermann, news anchor at Austrian Broadcasting's news program Zeit im Bild.
