= Inge von Bönninghausen =

German journalist

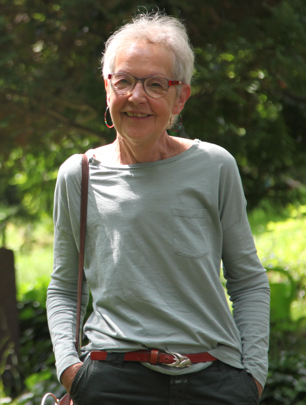
Inge von Bönninghausen

Inge von Bönninghausen (born 20 September 1938 in Uerdingen, Niederrhein) is a German journalist and feminist. She ran the television programme Frauen-Fragen (later Frau-TV) on WDR television and was a co-founder of the Journalistinnenbund in 1988. From 2000 to 2004 she was chairwoman of the German Women's Council.

== Life ==
Inge von Bönninghausen was the eldest of four children of Renate von Bönninghausen, born Laux, and Rolf Freiherr von Bönninghausen, an economist with a doctorate. Her childhood was eventful, as her parents and their children moved six times in three years due to the war and post-war period. As the eldest, Inge von Bönninghausen had duties and privileges. In 1958, she graduated from the municipal girls' grammar school in Wesel. At the age of 17, she was the first exchange student there to go to the twin city in Hagerstown (Maryland) in 1956. She returned with the intention of becoming a journalist after graduating from high school. She then studied German Studies and History in Göttingen until she was offered a place at the Free University of Berlin. During this time, she experienced the building of the Berlin Wall, the Cuban Missile Crisis and the confrontation between East and West in the 1960s. In 1968, she completed her doctorate under Eberhard Lämmert with a thesis on "Satire in the early work of Jean Paul".

An important personal step was her lesbian coming out in 1991 in the programme series Frauen-Fragen, which she hosted. Von Bönninghausen lives in Cologne.

== Journalism ==
After internships at the Düsseldorfer Nachrichten, she spent a year in 1969/1970 as an assistant to the programme director at Saarländischer Rundfunk. She then worked as a freelance journalist and published the series "Experiment Erziehung" (WDR), "Elternschule" (ZDF) and "Schulsorgen" (WDR), among others.

From 1974 until her retirement in 1999, she was a television editor at WDR. There she established a monthly feminist TV programme, which was first broadcast in 1980 under the title Frauenstudien, later Frauen-Fragen and from 1997 weekly under the title Frau-TV. The aim was to focus on the reality of women's lives and report on the topics of work, health, sport, sexuality, violence, culture, political parties, Europe and international women's politics. It was the first women's political TV programme on German television.

In addition to the regular programmes, the twelve-part Unerhört – Die Geschichte der Deutschen Frauenbewegung von 1830 bis heute, which was broadcast in 1987, was created together with editors from NDR and HR and is considered an "exceptional case of Fernsehgeschichte".

She was the only representative of a public broadcaster from Germany to report on population and health at the 3rd UN World Conference on Women in Nairobi in 1985 and at the NGO Forum of the 4th UN World Conference on Women in Beijing in 1995.

Von Bönninghausen was co-author of the Study on the situation of female employees at WDR, co-founder of the station's Women's Group and representative of WDR in the Steering Committee on Equal Opportunities at the European Commission.

Between 1986 and 2007, Inge von Bönninghausen was a speaker and moderator at women's media conferences in Africa, Asia and South America.

== Honorary posts ==
Von Bönninghausen was co-founder of the Journalistinnenbund in 1988 and its chairwoman from 1991 to 1999. She has accompanied young female colleagues on their way into journalism within the jb mentoring programme several times since 2001. As a member of the International Association of Women in Radio and Television, she is also active internationally.

From 2000 to 2004, she was chairwoman of the Deutscher Frauenrat and board member of the European Women's Lobby.

She is an honorary member of the NRW regional group of Wirtschaftsweiber, was on the board of the Stiftung Archiv der deutschen Frauenbewegung in Kassel (ADDF) and on the board of the "Lobby for Girls" in Cologne.

== Honours ==
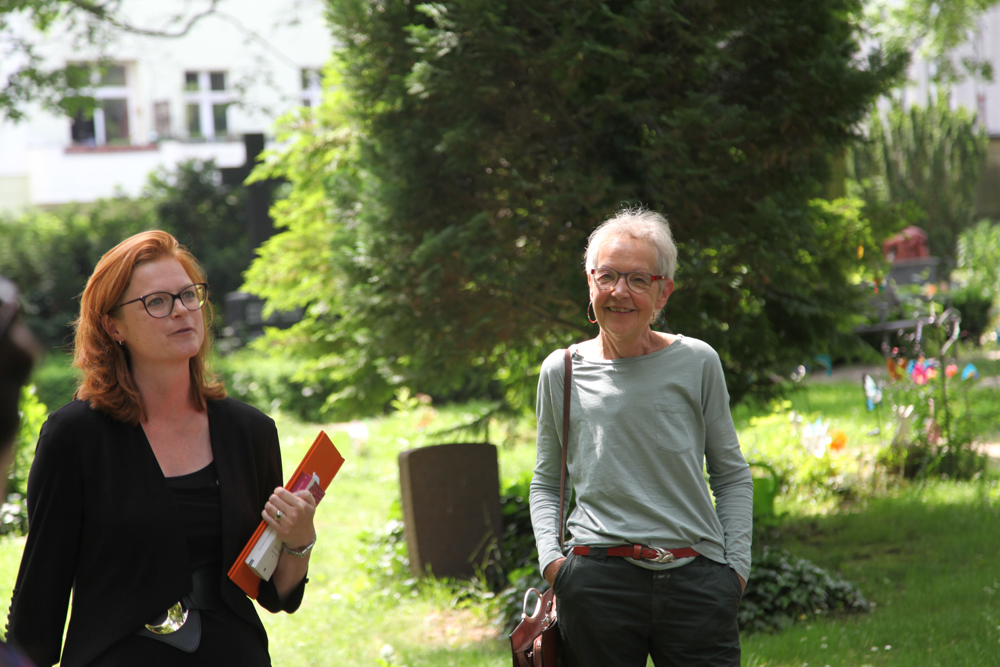
Inge von Bönninghausen (right) 2016 at the grave of Hedwig Dohm

In honour of Inge von Bönninghausen, eleven women's initiatives in North Rhine-Westphalia awarded the "Shooting Star – the Inge von Bönninghausen Prize", a necklace designed by an artist. The prize was awarded every two years from 1998 to 2012. She herself was the first winner in 1998.

In 1999, Inge von Bönninghausen was honoured with the Hedwig Dohm Certificate of the Journalistinnenbund for her achievements in making the expertise of women working in journalism publicly visible.

In 2012, she was awarded the Augspurg-Heymann Prize for her lesbian political commitment by the LAG Lesben in NRW.

The Special Honour of the Grimme Prize went to Inge von Bönninghausen in 2018. The jury called her a "pioneer in the German television landscape who has thematised, demanded and lived the work, impact and influence of women in the media".

== Quotes ==
In the laudatory speech for the award of the Hedwig Dohm Certificate in 1999, Sabine Zurmühl said:

"Her feminist commitment has been credited with issues that until then had been largely ignored by the media. Not only as chairwoman, but also as a member of other international associations, she has made a significant contribution to making the expertise of women working in journalism visible to the public."

On the occasion of the 2018 Grimme Award ceremony, which she received together with Armin Wolf and Gert Scobel, the then Saarland Minister President Annegret Kramp-Karrenbauer said:

"The German Adult Education Association is thus sending a clear signal for quality journalism – each award winner embodies one of its facets."

== Awards ==
- Federal Cross of Merit on ribbon (8 October 1996)
- Sternschnuppe – Inge-von-Bönninghausen Prize (1998)
- Hedwig Dohm Certificate (1999)
- Augspurg-Heymann Prize (2012)
- Special honour of the Grimme Prize (2018), together with Armin Wolf and Gert Scobel

== Publications ==
- with Ernst Stobberg: Schulsorgen – Wer die Ursachen kennt, kann helfen. Verlagsgesellschaft Rudolf Müller, Cologne-Braunsfeld 1971, ISBN 3-481-21001-9.
- Spiel mit mir – Lern mit mir: Die Förderung des Kindes im Vorschulalter. Based on the ZDF Parents' School. Verlagsgesellschaft Rudolf Müller, Cologne-Braunsfeld 1972, ISBN 3-481-21011-6.
- with Jutta Dreisbach-Olsen: Experiment Erziehung: Antiautoritäre Erziehung – und was nun? Verlagsgesellschaft Rudolf Müller, Cologne-Braunsfeld 1973, ISBN 3-481-40461-1.
- with Paul Bielicki, Jutta Dreisbach-Olsen, Hannelore Meyer: ZDF-Elternschule 1974: Die großen Probleme der Kleinen. Verlagsgesellschaft Rudolf Müller, Cologne-Braunsfeld 1974.
- with Ernst Stobberg: Schulsorgen? Humboldt-Taschenbuchverlag, Munich 1992, ISBN 3-581-66239-6.
- with Gisela Helwig, Freya Klier: Ungleiche Schwestern? Women in East Germany and West Germany. Nicolai, Berlin 1998, ISBN 3-87584-713-X

== Film ==
- WDR Geschichte(n) – Inge von Bönninghausen. Written and directed by Klaus Michael Heinz, 60 min., WDR television 2020, WDR Mediathek indefinitely.
