= Michael Bohmeyer =

German entrepreneur, author and activist

Michael Bohmeyer (born 1 October 1984, in Rüdersdorf) is a German entrepreneur, author and activist for universal basic income in the country. In 2014, he founded the association Mein Grundeinkommen.

== Life and career ==
Together with others, Bohmeyer founded various companies: the online sign trade Bohmeyer & Schuster GmbH, the social network want2do AG and the technology startup admineo UG.

As a passive co-owner of Bohmeyer & Schuster since 2013, Bohmeyer receives an annual profit distribution. He perceived this unpowered income as „eine Art Bedingungsloses Grundeinkommen“ ("a kind of unconditional basic income"). Inspired by this experience, he founded the non-governmental organization Mein Grundeinkommen in 2014. The NGO uses crowdfunding to collect money to be raffled off as a one-year basic income of 1,000 euros per month among the people registered on its website. As of 2021, over 800 people have gained a one-year basic income.

In 2015 Bohmeyer took part in the establishment of the association Sanktionsfrei, which offers recipients of Arbeitslosengeld II legal and financial help.

In 2018 the documentary film Free Lunch Society - Come Come Basic Income was released, with Michael Bohmeyer as initiator and founder of Mein Grundeinkommen.

In 2021, he appeared on the ZDF program „13 Fragen“.

== Film ==
- 2018: Free Lunch Society - Come Come Basic Income. Documentary film, Austria / Germany, director: Christian Tod; production: Golden Girls with Michael Bohmeyer and others

== Works ==
- 2019: Michael Bohmeyer and Claudia Cornelsen: Was würdest Du tun? Wie uns das Bedingungslose Grundeinkommen verändert, Econ Verlag 2019, ISBN 3430210070
