= Susanne Wiest =

German activist (born 1967)

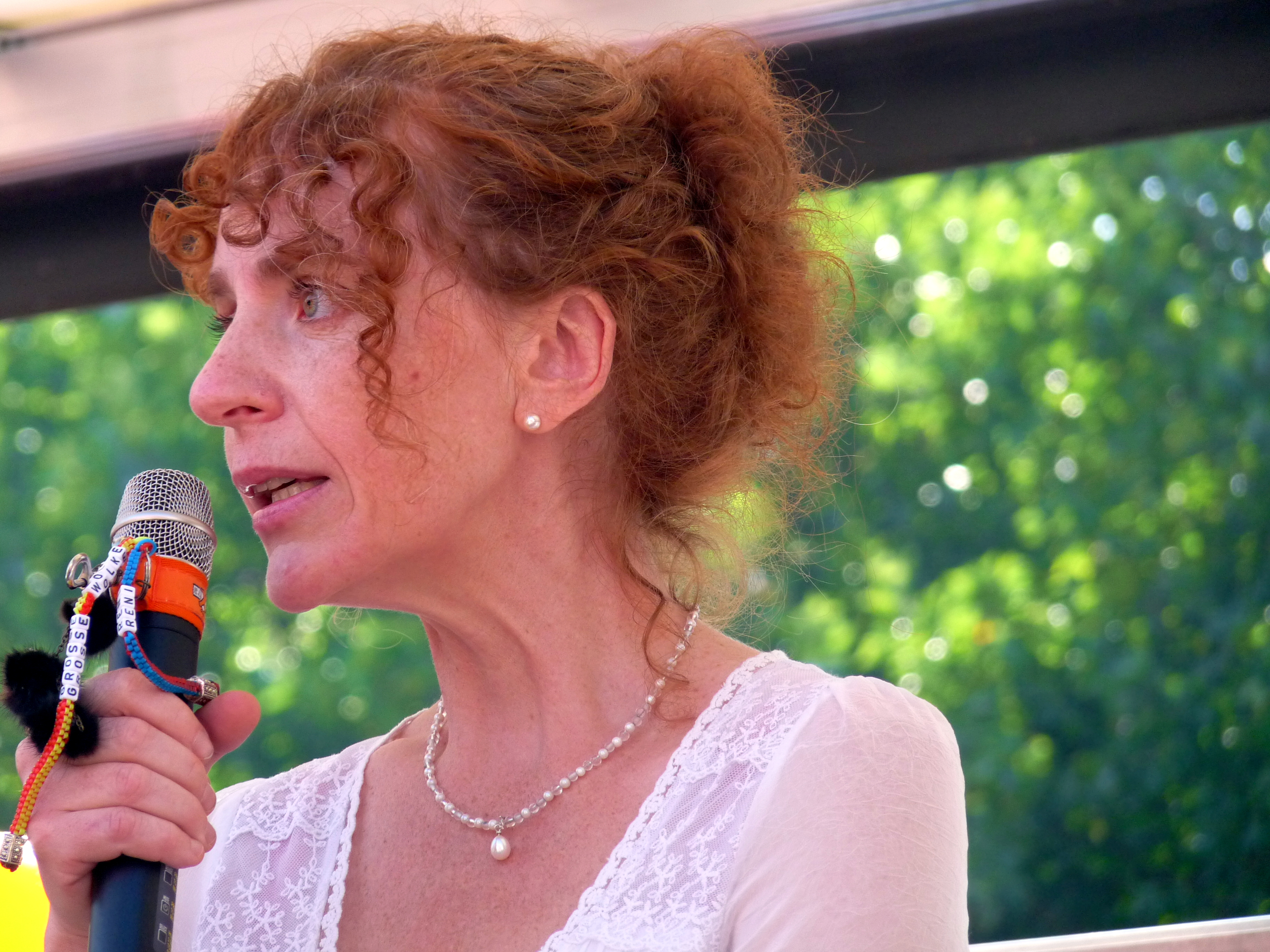
Wiest in Berlin, September 2013

Susanne Wiest (born 16 January 1967) is a German activist for the unconditional basic income.

A childcare worker, Susanne Wiest is known in Germany for having launched a petition to the German Parliament asking for the implementation of a basic income in Germany of 1,000 euros a month. The petition went so viral that not only did it receive more than 52,000 signatures of support, but the hosting services were overloaded in the last days of the collection period, forcing the Bundestag to extend the duration of the petition by one week.

The petition then was accepted and Wiest was invited for a hearing at the Bundestag's Commission of Petitions. The hearing took place on 8 November 2010 following which Wiest was featured in the German media. In June 2013, the petition was finally closed by the Parliament, thus depriving the supporters of basic income of any parliamentary debate on the issue.

Susanne Wiest ran in the 2009 German federal election as an independent candidate. She received 1.2% of the votes cast in the Greifswald – Demmin – Ostvorpommern constituency. Since December 2012, she has been a member of the Pirate Party of Germany. Since 2017, Wiest is chairman of the German party Bündnis Grundeinkommen (Basic Income League), which was founded in September 2016 and was admitted to German federal election 2017 and reached 0.2% of the votes.

On 14 March 2020, during the COVID-19 pandemic in Germany, Wiest started another petition to the Bundestag, which was quickly signed by more than 100,000 people.

== See also ==
- Basic Income Alliance
- List of advocates of basic income
- Universal basic income in Germany
