= Susanne Kastrup Forslund =

Danish handball player (born 1983)

Personal information
- Nationality: Danish
- Born: 24 June 1983 (age 43) Luxembourg City, Luxembourg
- Height: 173 cm (68 in)

Sport
- Sport: Handball
- Position: Left Wing
- Current club: Retired

Senior clubs
- Years: Team
- 1999–2013: KIF Vejen
- 2013–2016: Team Esbjerg
National team
Years	Team	Apps	(Gls)
2007–2009	Denmark	32	(78)

Susanne Kastrup Forslund (Born 24 June 1983 in Luxembourg) is a Danish former handballer, who played for the Danish teams Team Esbjerg from 2013 to 2017 and KIF Vejen from 1999 to 2013. She retired in 2016 aged 34 due to pregnancy and her contract expiring.

She moved to Vejen, Denmark, at the age of nine.

She played 32 national team matches and participated in IHF World Women's Handball Championship in 2009.
