= Susanne Munch Thore =

Norwegian lawyer and businesswoman

Susanne Elise Munch Thore (born 1960) is a Norwegian lawyer and businesswoman. After serving as a partner (managing partner from 2011) at the legal firm Wikborg Rein from 1993, she was appointed director at Odfjell Drilling in June 2018.

== Biography ==
Munch Thore graduated as a lawyer from the University of Oslo in 1897. In 1989, she earned a master of laws degree from Georgetown University. After serving as a legal officer at the Oslo Stock Exchange (1992–93), she joined Wikborg Rein where she specialized in corporate law, dealing with mergers and acquisitions and capital market transactions. Her clients there included private equity companies and investment banks. From 2002 to 2006, she headed the advisory group on corporate law at the Norwegian Bar Association. Munch, who has gained considerable board experience, now chairs the Norwegian real estate company Oslo Areal.

In 2009, Munch Thore was recommended by Chambers and Partners and by Legal 500 under "Leaders in their field" for her competence in Corporate M&A and Capital Markets.
