= Universal basic income in Germany =

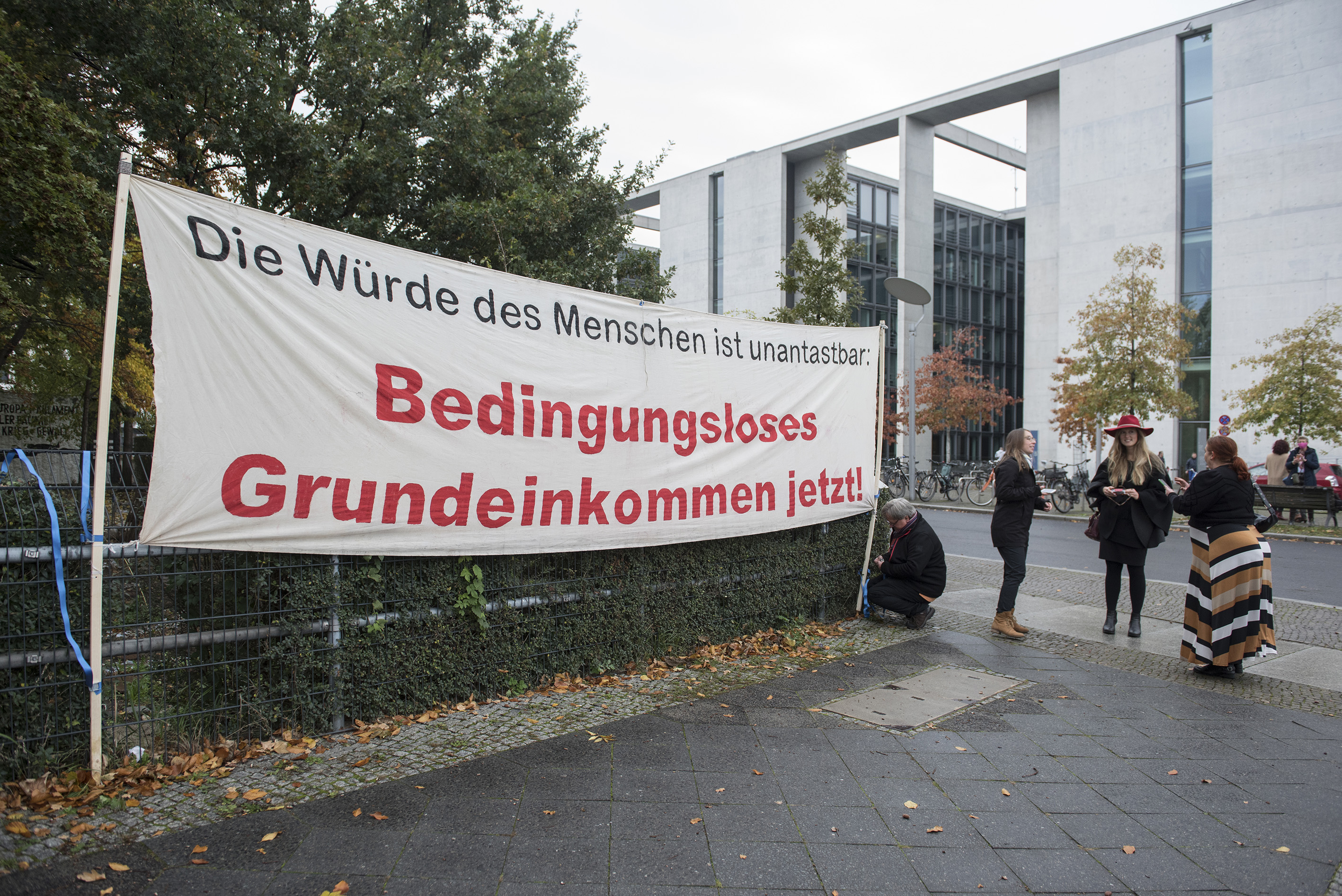
"Basic Income NOW!" campaign, October 2020

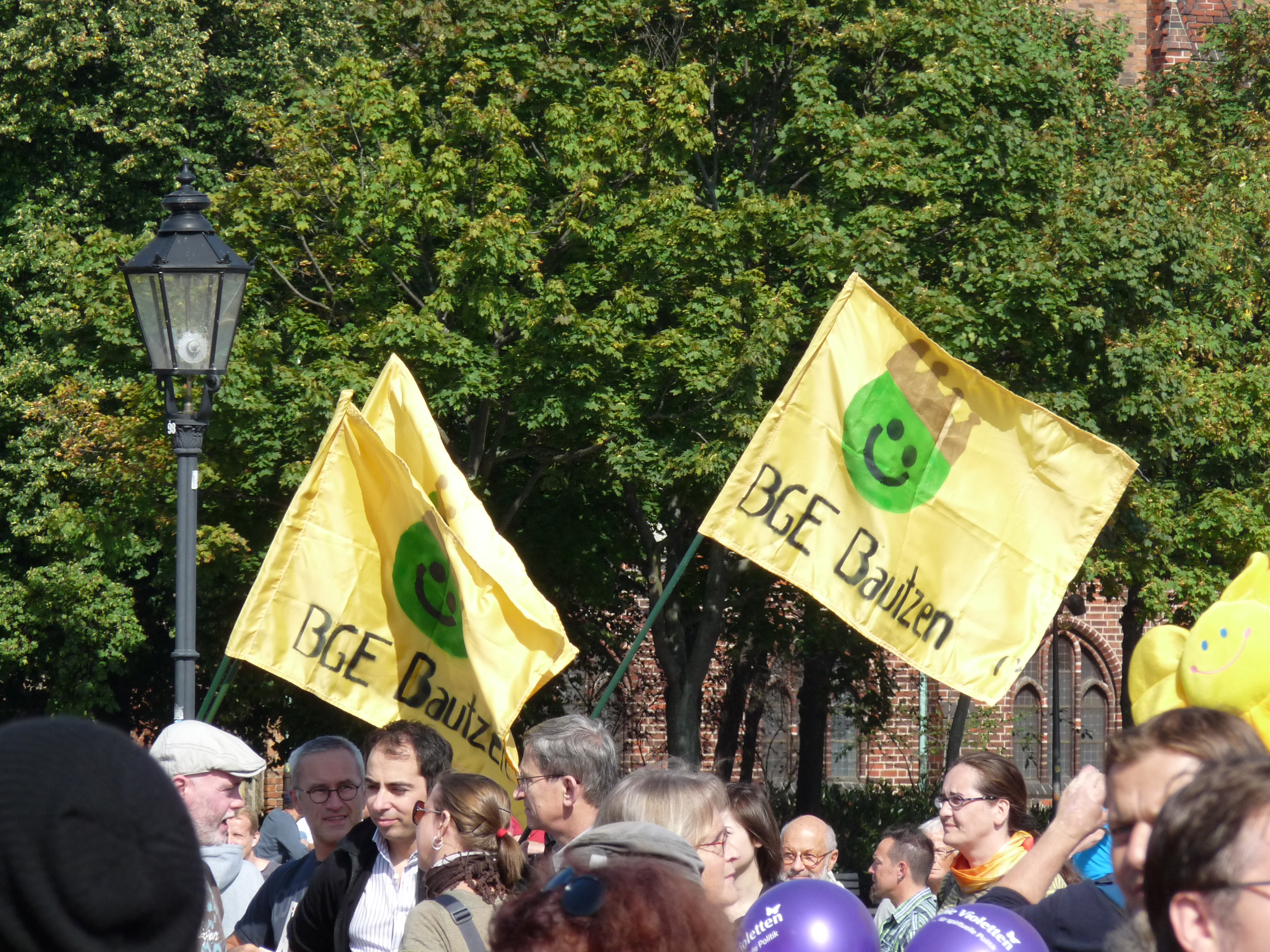
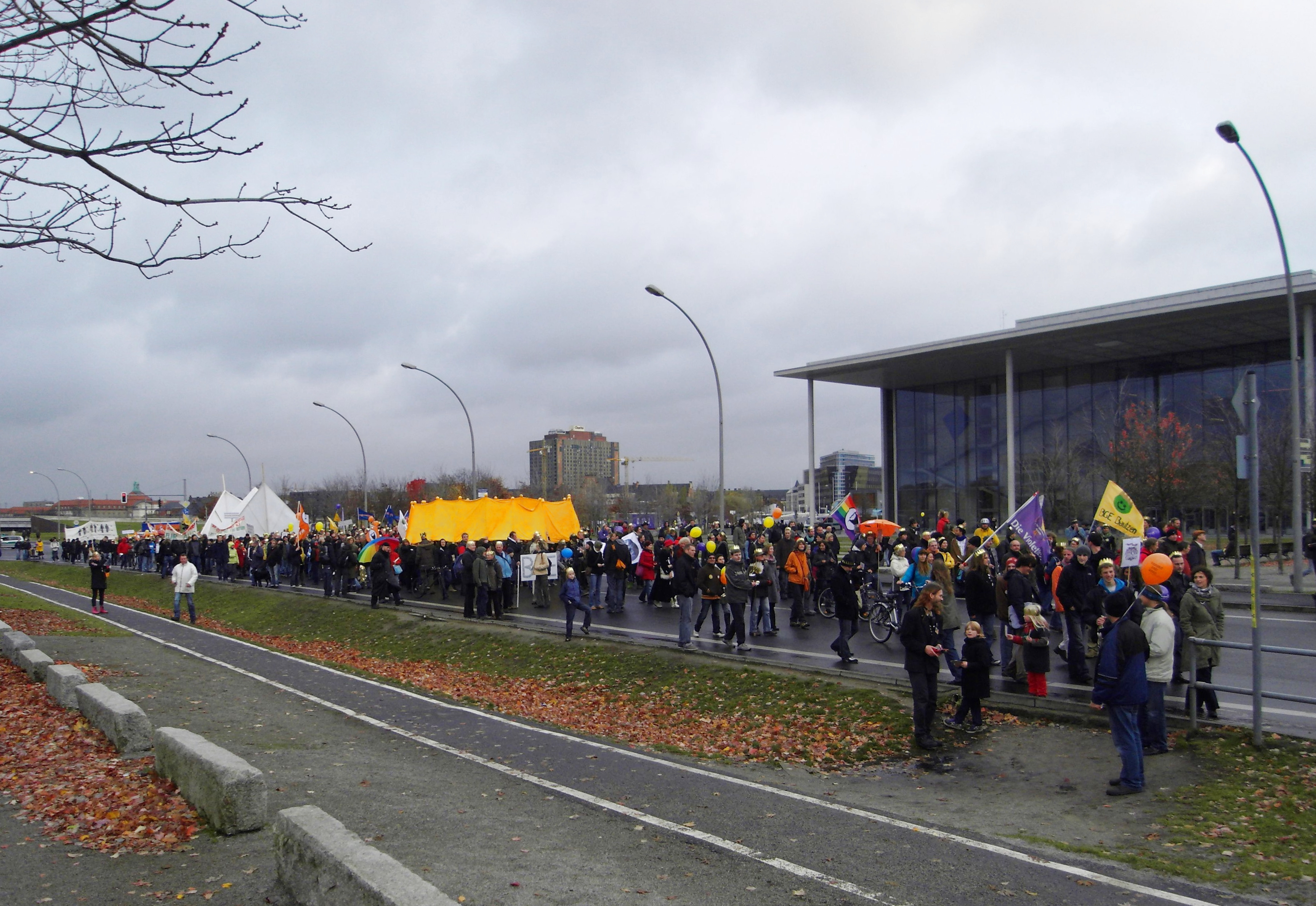
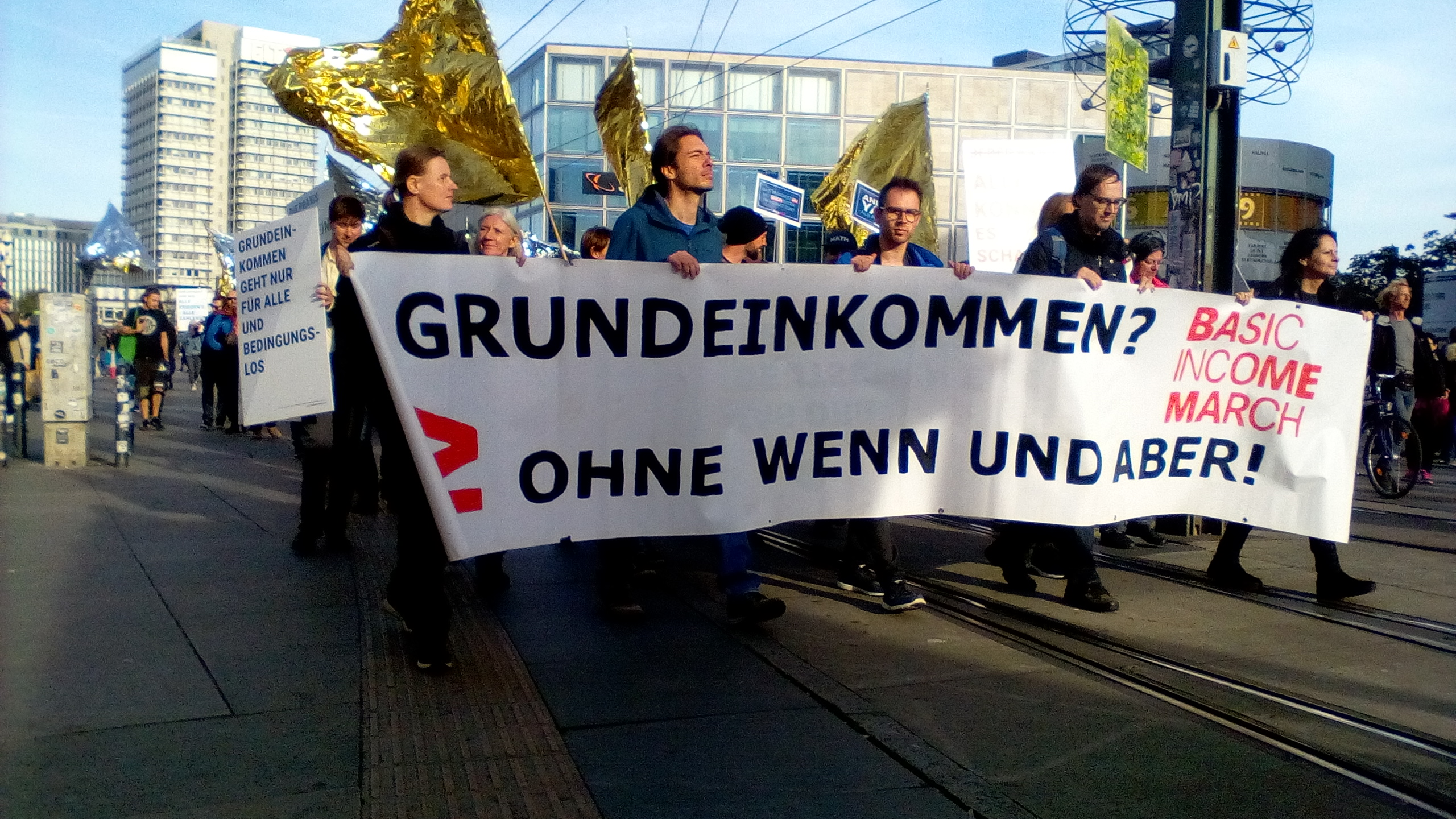
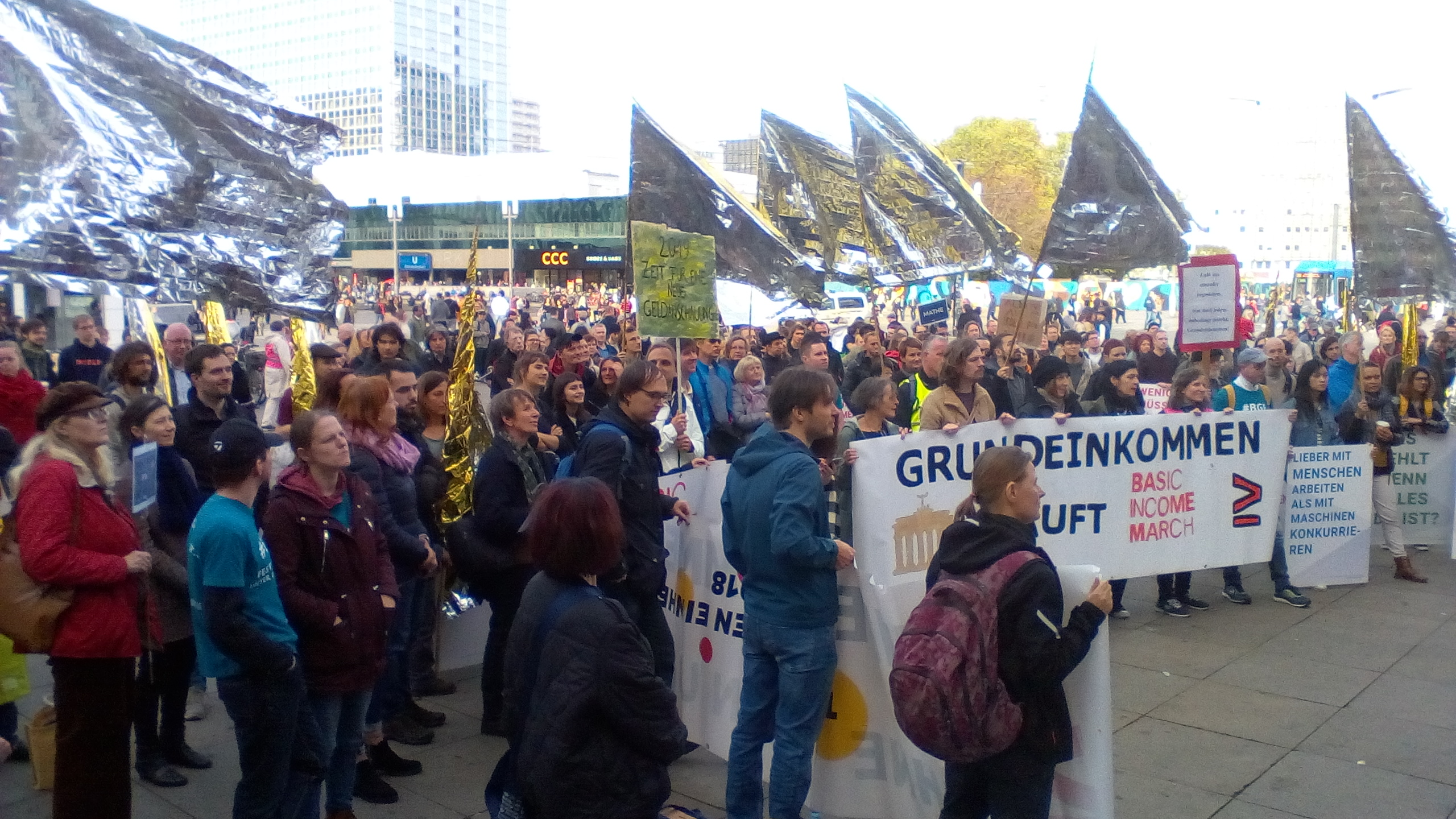
The basic income demonstration in Berlin, 6 November 2010

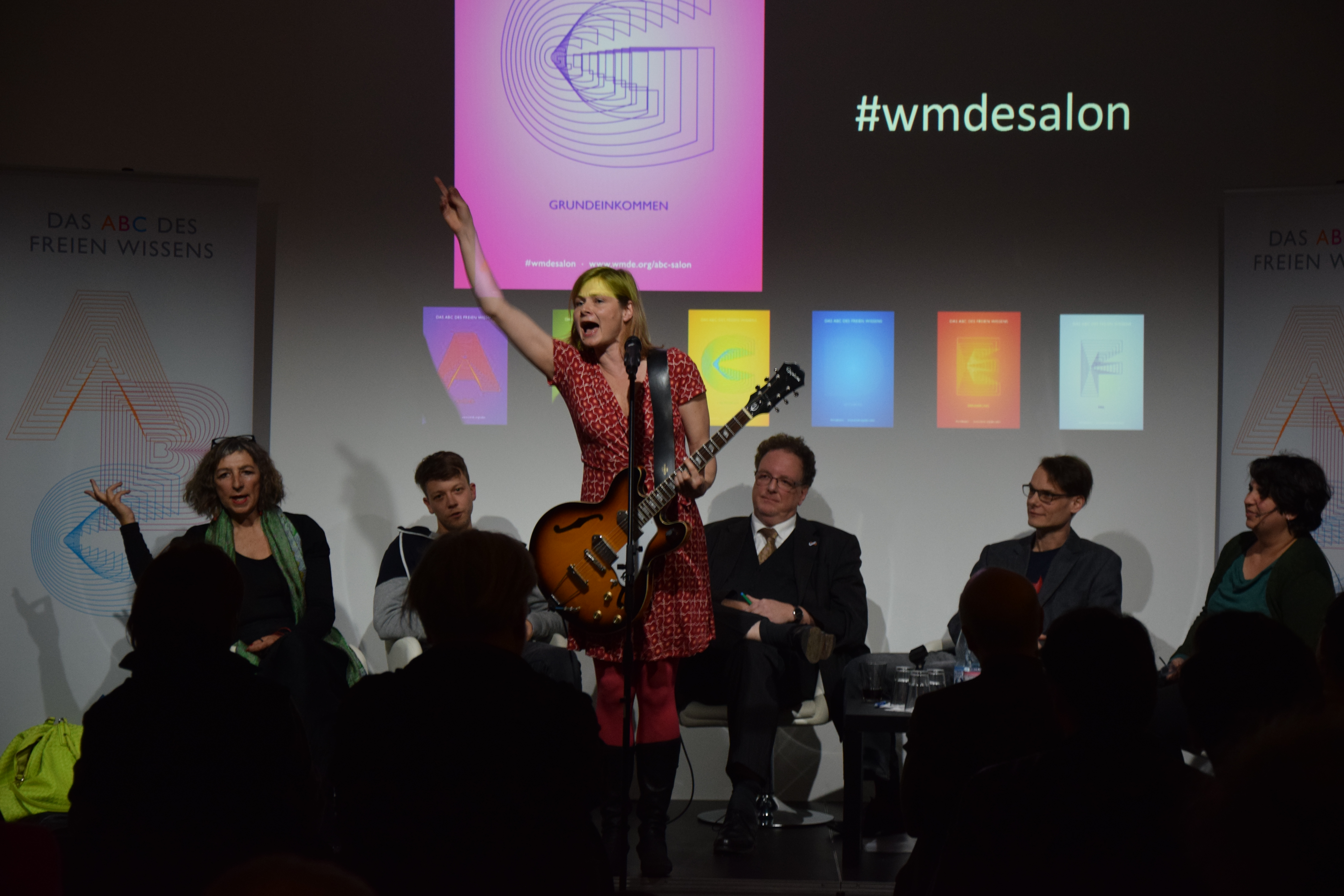
Music performance during a panel debate about basic income on 26 March 2015. In the panel: Olaf Zimmermann, Adrienne Goehler, Ilja Braun, Michael Bohmeyer. Moderator: Matthias Spielkamp.

Universal basic income in Germany (German: Grundeinkommen) has been discussed since the 1970s, with emphasis placed on its unconditional dimension by 2003. The universal basic income concept has many definitions, such as Philippe Van Parijs', which described it as the income paid by the government, at a uniform level and regular intervals to each adult citizen and permanent residents of the country. The Basic Income Earth Network's criteria constitute one of the most popular proposals and they include: 1) income must be paid to individuals instead of households; 2) income should be paid irrespective of income from other sources; and, 3) it must be paid without requiring performance of any work.

== History ==
The debate about basic income in West Germany began gathering steam in the 1980s, when groups of unemployed people became interested and took a stance for the reform. When Basic Income European Network was founded (today Basic Income Earth Network) in 1986, there was a German sociologist among the founders, Claus Offe, who since then has been active in the academic debate. In 2004, the Netzwerk Grundeinkommen was founded. The Hartz reforms introduced by the second Schröder cabinet in 2003–2005 triggered the basic income debate, even though the reforms themselves were widely seen as stongly anti-basic income.

In 2009, Susanne Wiest, a home wife, made a presentation in the Bundestag about the basic income petition she had initiated and got support from 52.973 people. The next year, there were several basic income-demonstrations, the biggest in Berlin. By 2011, the Pirate Party Germany proposed basic income on the state parliament and after a two-hour-long debate it was decided that they would work for basic income along with minimum wages.

In 2012, there was a meeting Susanne Wiest and Chancellor Angela Merkel to discuss basic income. The meeting took place under the democracy project "Dialog über Deutschland". On 25 September 2016, a new political party was founded, Bündnis Grundeinkommen ("Basic Income League", called BGE Partei for short). The league was admitted for state elections for the first time in federal state Saarland in January 2017 and in April 2017 for the state elections in federal state Nordrhein-Westfalen. Bündnis Grundeinkommen was admitted for the German federal election 2017.

There is a two-tier unemployment compensation system in Germany, which consists of a form of UBI and basic income ALG II with strict behavioral requirements for the unemployed. For instance, active cooperation is a major condition for access. While the system does not satisfy the criteria of the Basic Income Earth Network and other reform proponents, the generosity of basic income transfers in the country is considered high by international standards, especially for claimants who have children. In July 2022, representative polling of over 1,000 adults in Germany conducted by YouGov was published that suggested that 55% of adults in Germany would support a universal basic income in the country. In August 2023, Mein Grundeinkommen calculated that a tax-financed universal basic income of €1,200 per month could be financed for every adult in Germany that would make 80% of adults better off.

== Proponents ==
Well-known parties calling for the introduction of a basic income across Germany are the Pirate Party Germany, Die PARTEI, and the Basic Income Alliance. Some of the most well-known individual proponents of basic income in recent decades include the following:

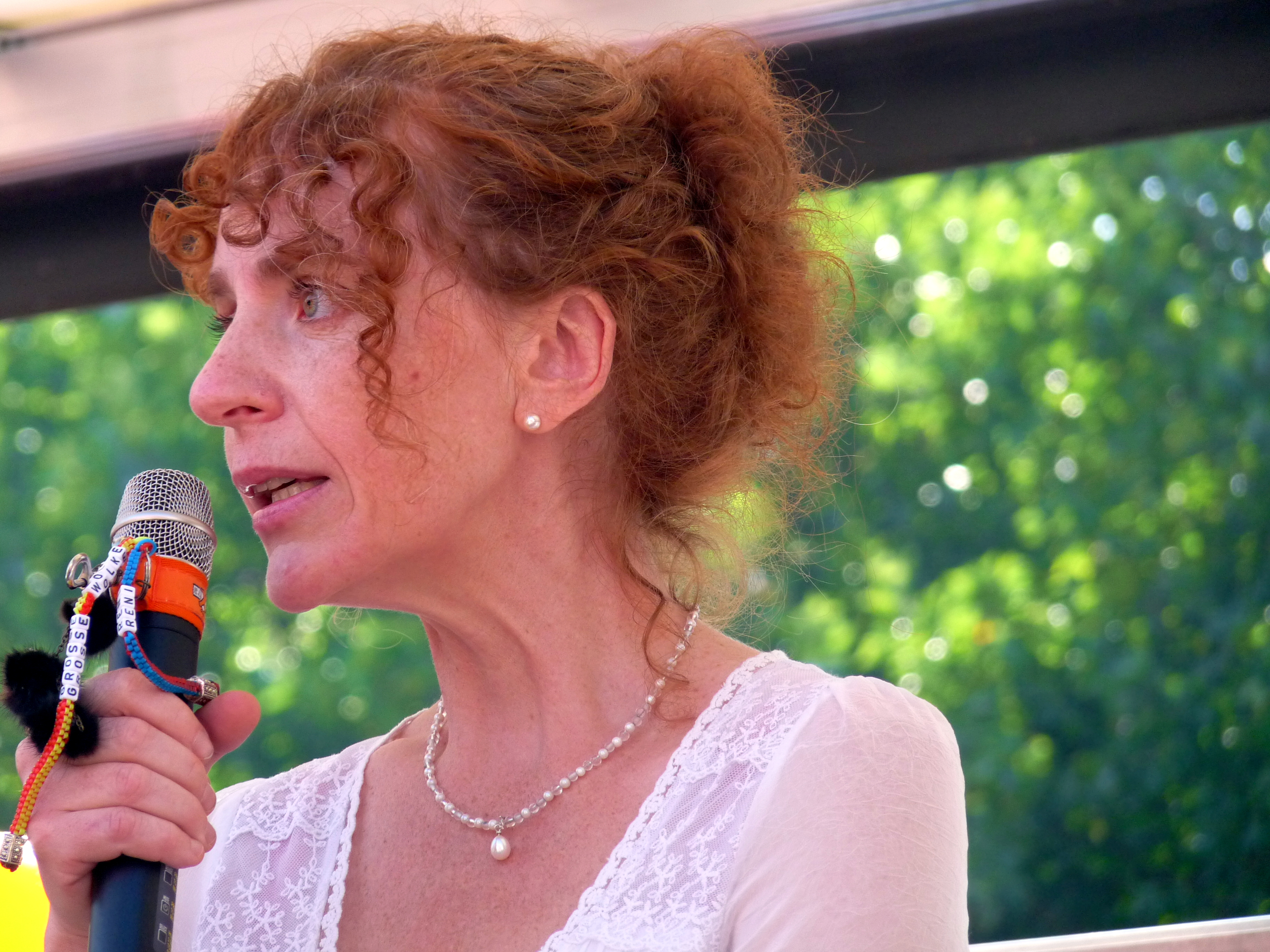
Susanne Wiest

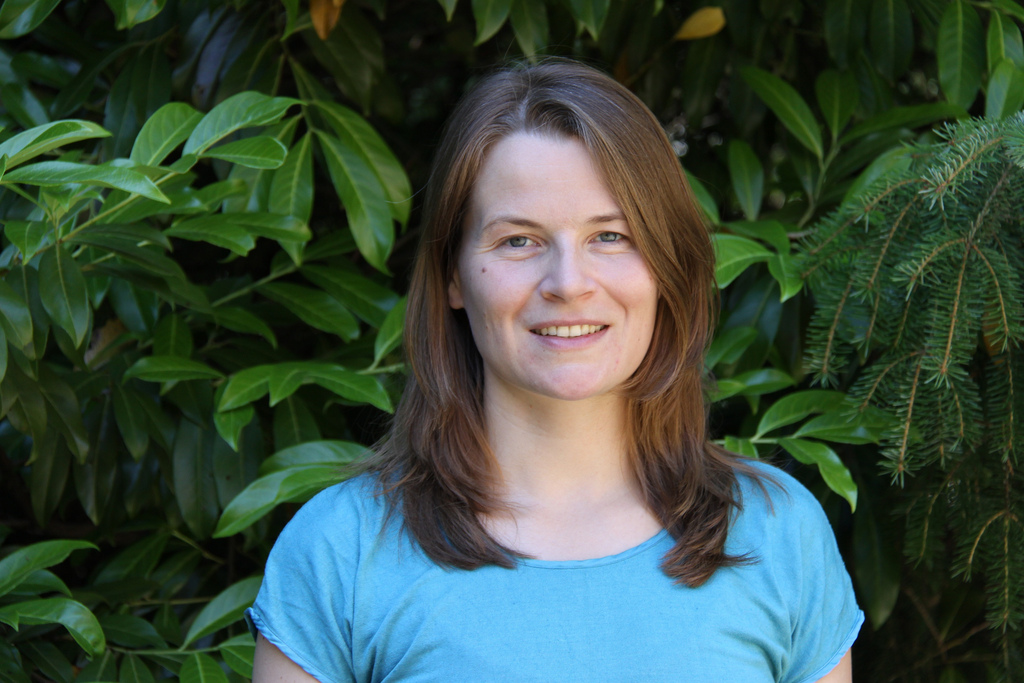
Sabine Niels, BÜNDNIS 90/DIE GRÜNEN (2010)

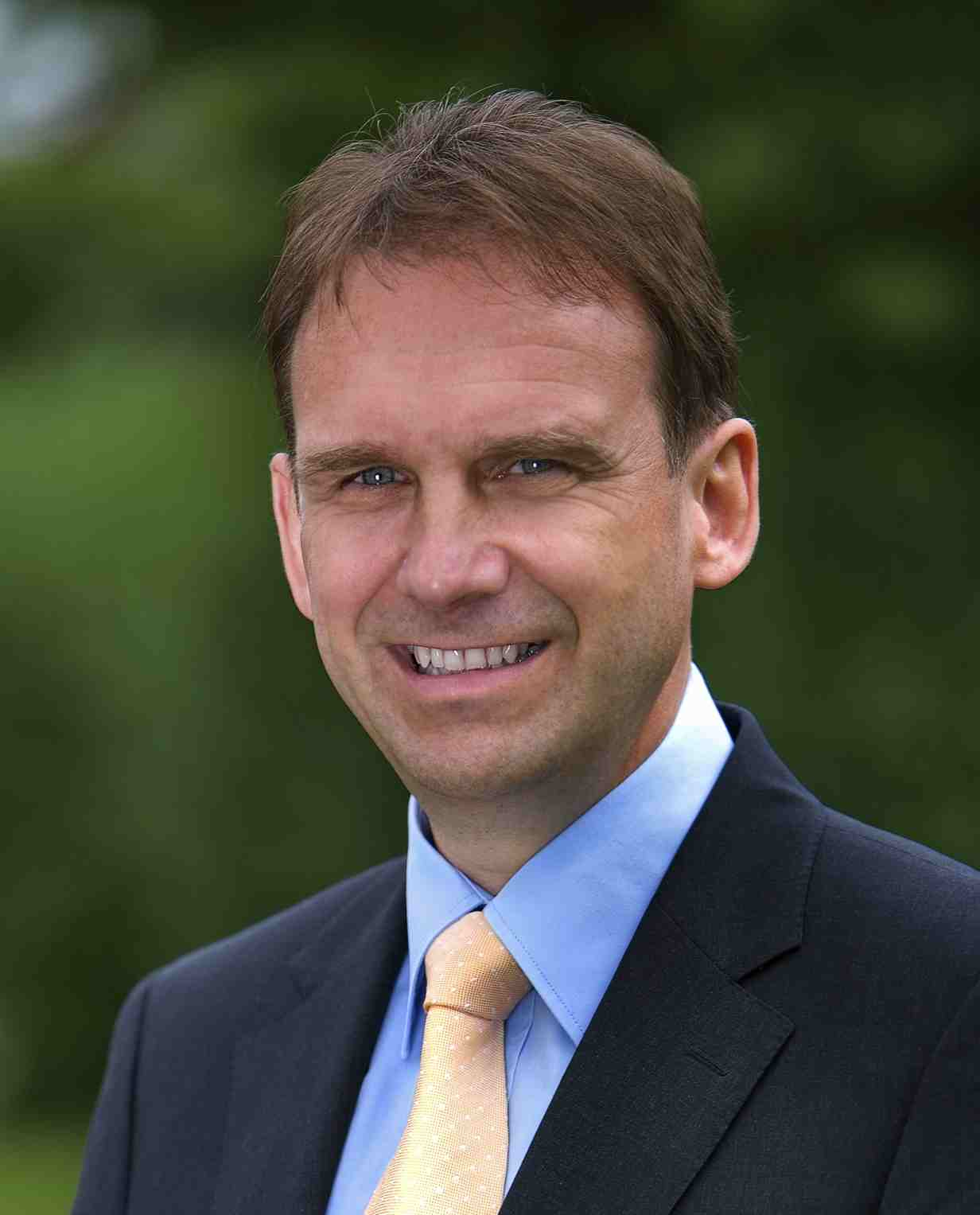
Dieter Althaus

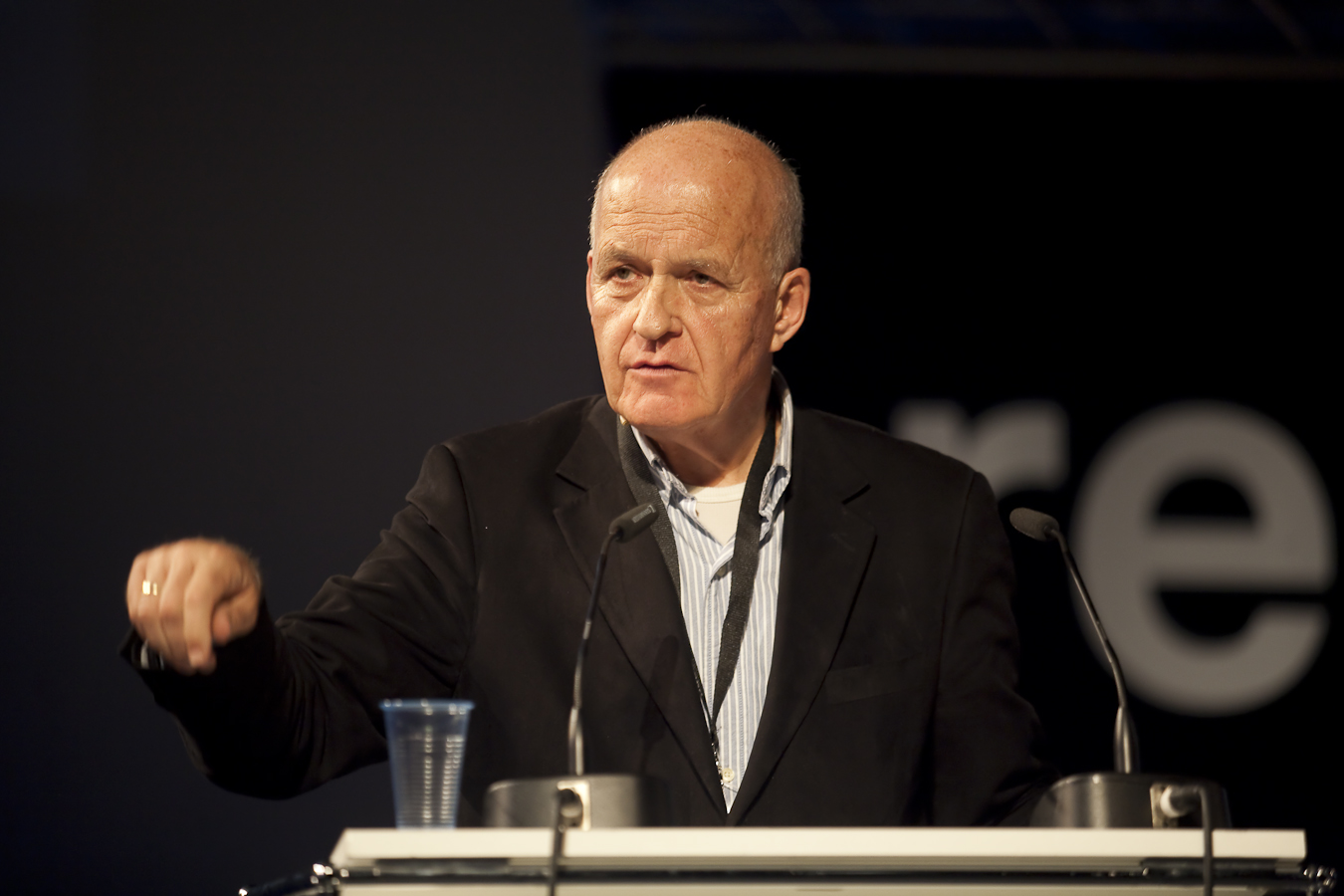
Götz Werner

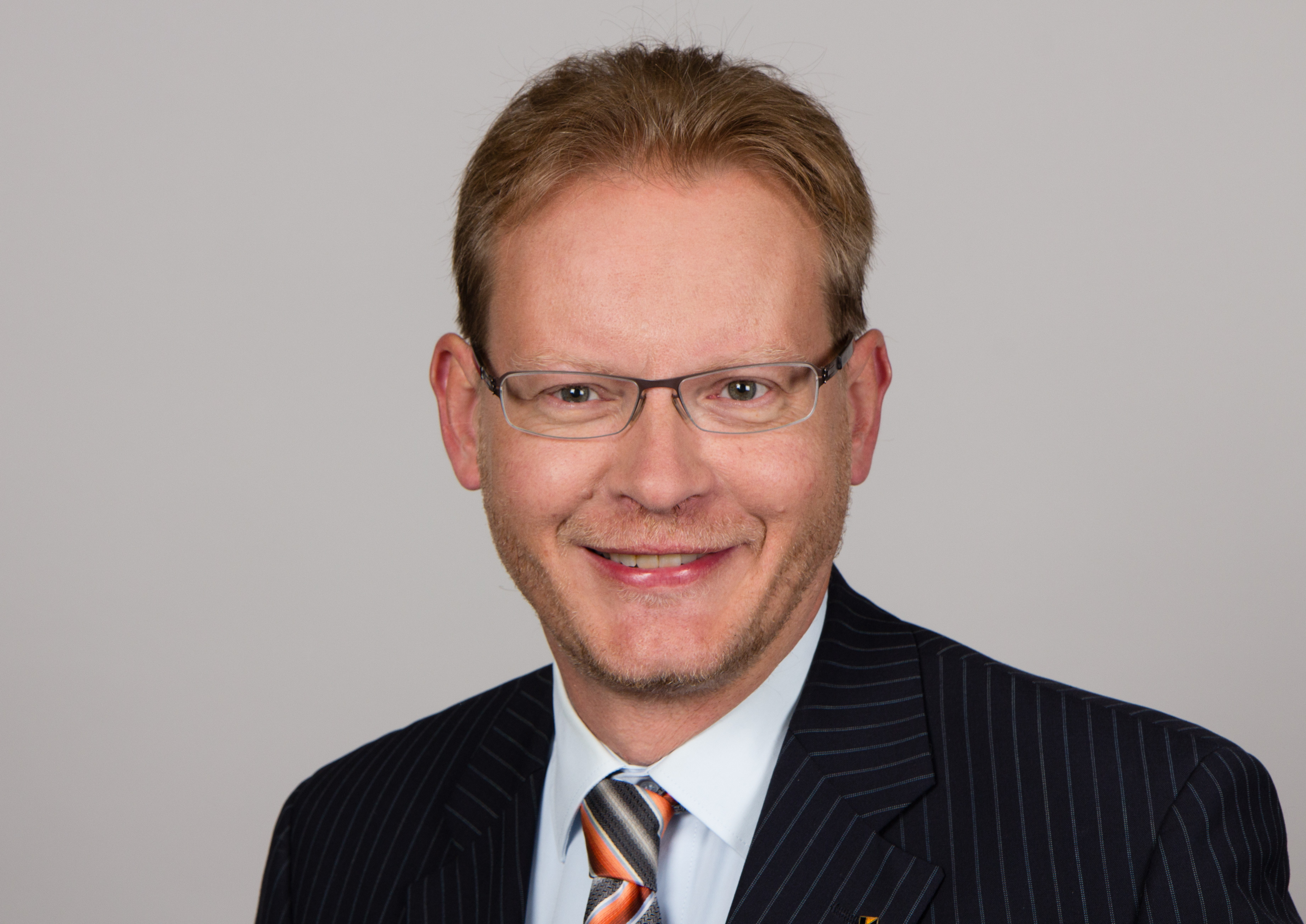
Thomas Dörflinger, CDU

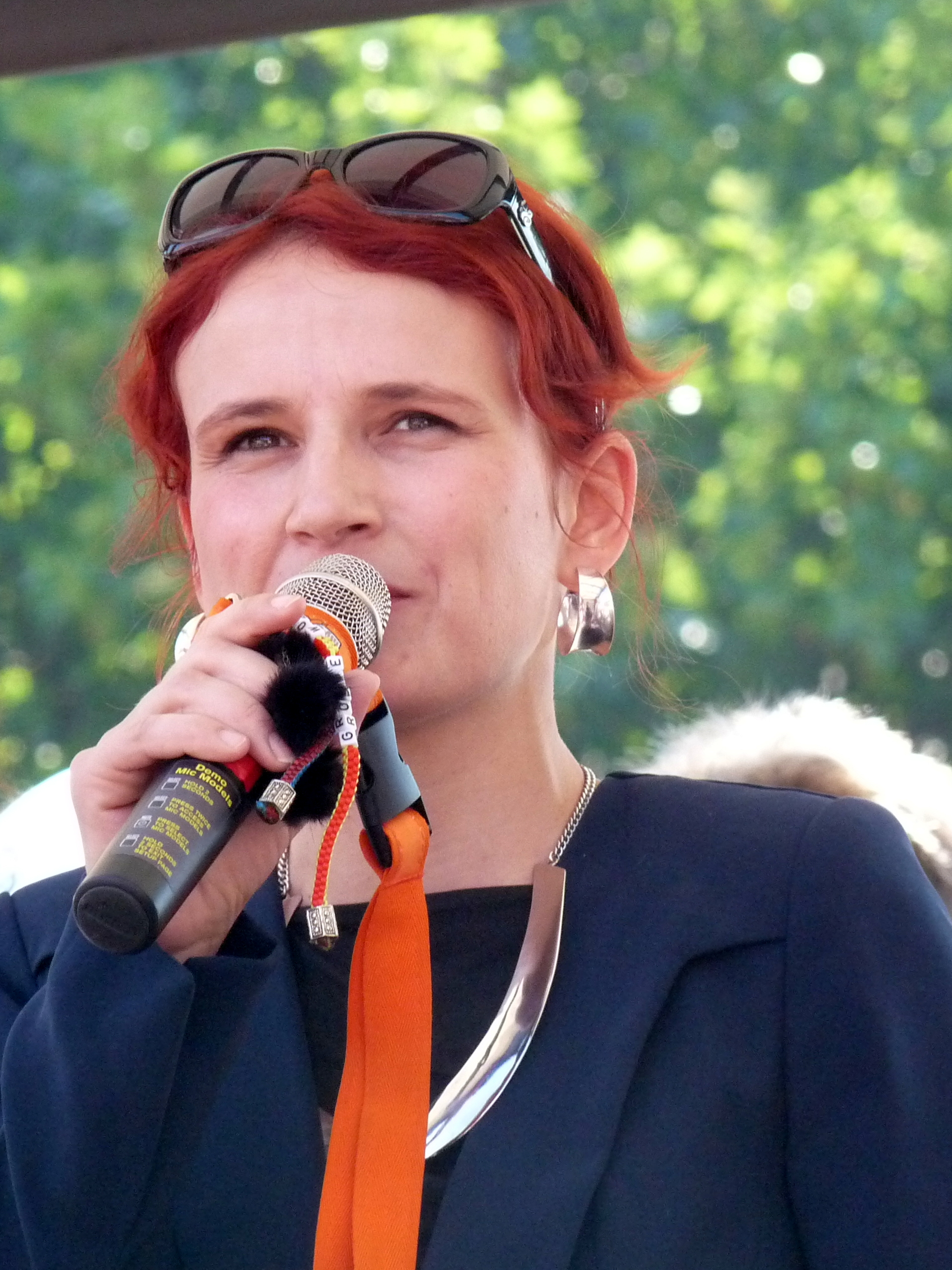
Katja Kipping, Berlin 2013

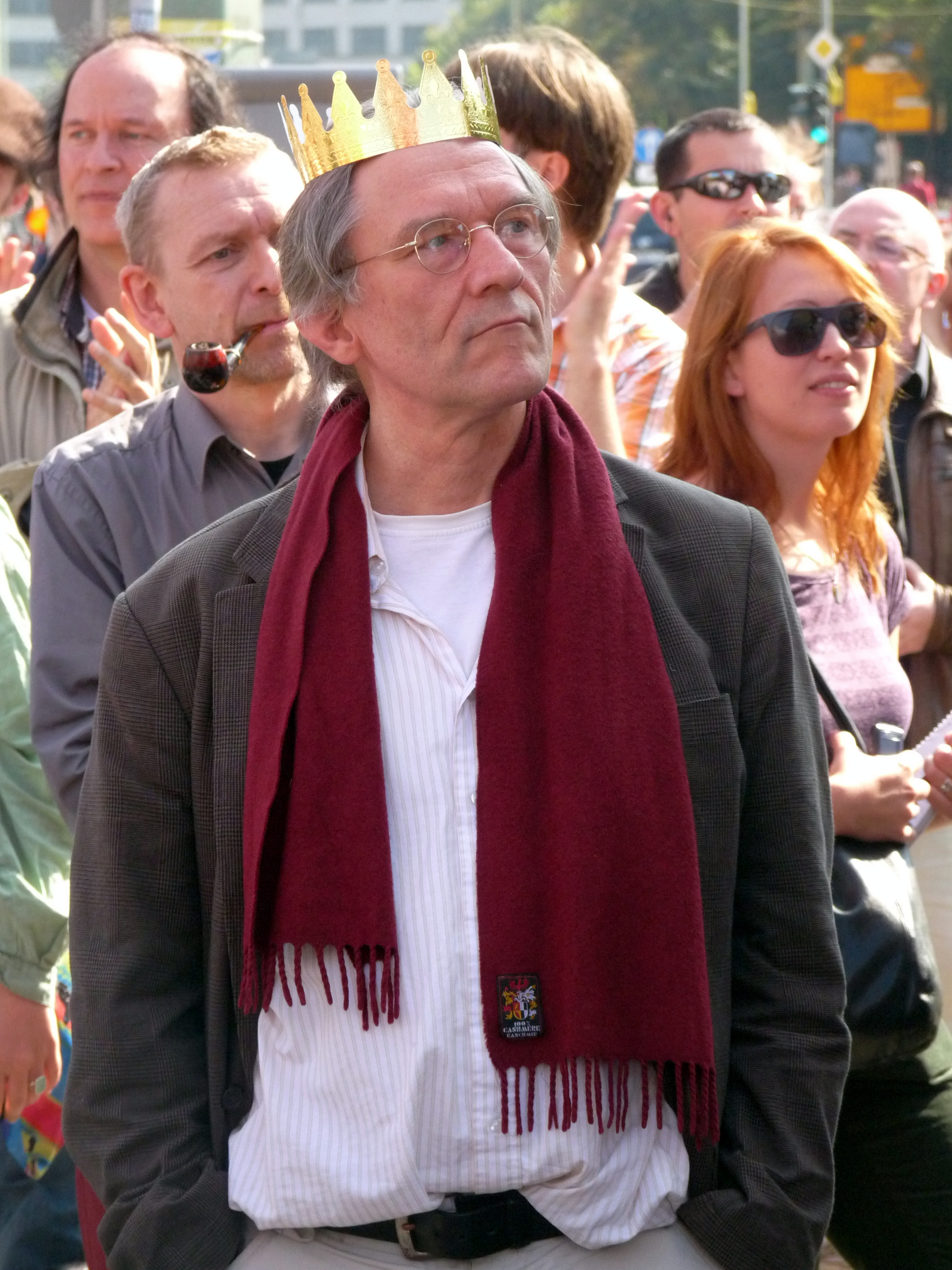
Ralph Boes, Berlin 2013

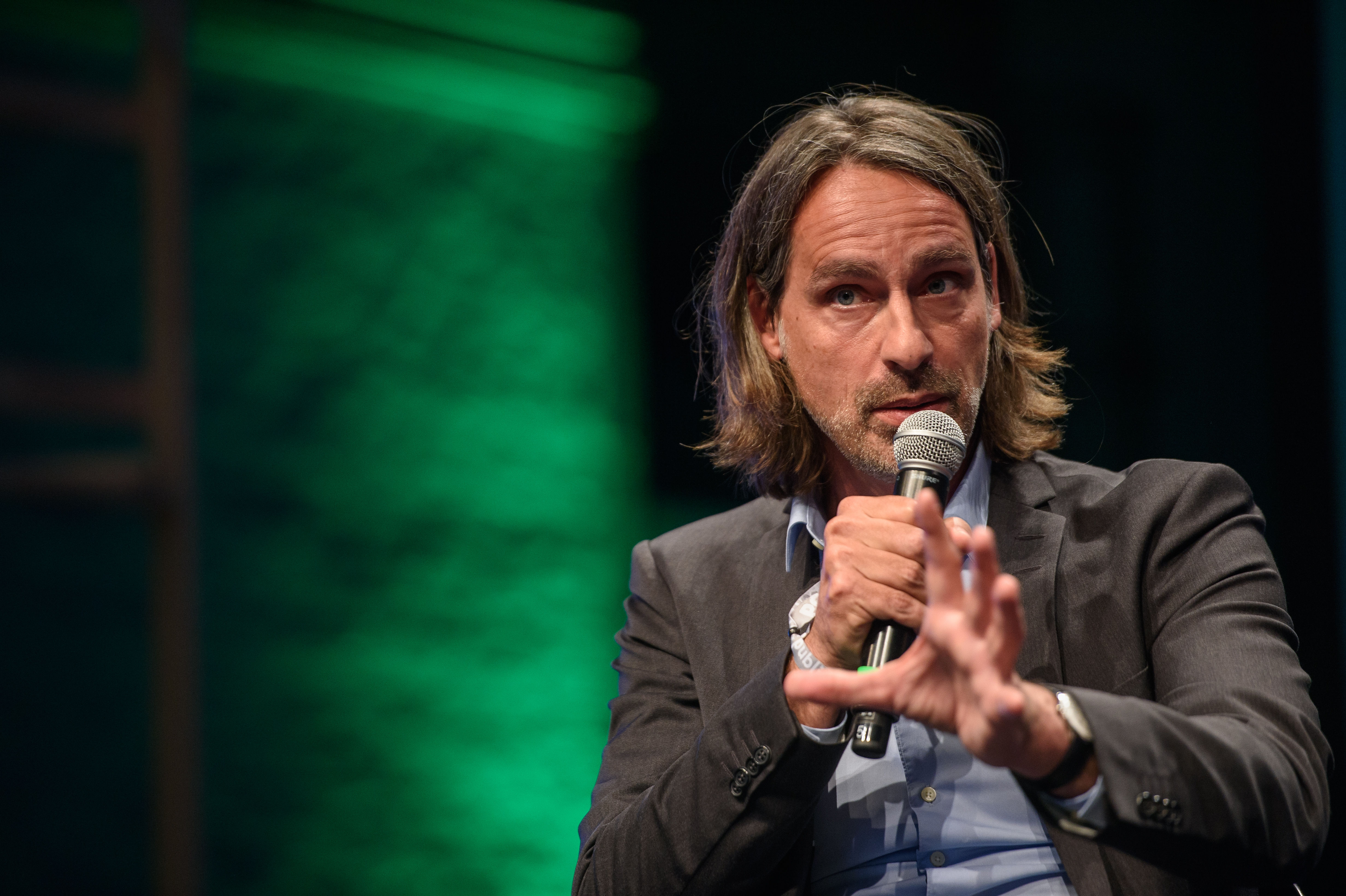
Richard David Precht

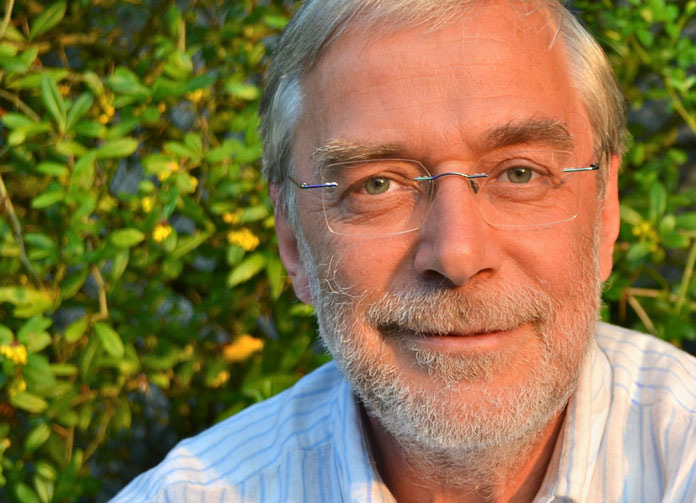
Gerald Hüther

== See also ==
- 2025 Hamburg universal basic income referendum
- Mein Grundeinkommen
