= Susanne Maselle =

Tanzanian politician

Honourable Susanne Peter Maselle MP

Member of Parliament Special Seats
- Incumbent
- Assumed office November 2015

Personal details
- Party: CHADEMA

Susanne Peter Maselle is a Tanzanian CHADEMA politician and Special Seats Member of Parliament since 2015. She was a member of the budget committee from 2015 to 2018. She has made a total of 10 contributions in the parliament and has asked 8 primary questions and 5 supplementary questions primarily concerning employment and mineral resources.
