= Susanne Dierolf =

German mathematician (1942–2009)

Susanne Dierolf (16 July 1942 – 24 April 2009) was a German mathematician specializing in the theory of topological vector spaces. She was a professor for many years at the University of Trier.

== Life ==
Dierolf was born on 16 July 1942 in Bratislava, at the time under German occupation and administered as part of Lower Austria.

She completed her doctorate in 1974 at LMU Munich, with the dissertation Über Vererbbarkeitseigenschaften in topologischen Vektorräumen supervised by Walter Roelcke. She continued at LMU Munich as an assistant, earning her habilitation there in 1985. She became a Privatdozent at Trier in 1985, and außerplanmäßiger Professor in 1991.

She died on 24 April 2009.

== Research ==
Dierolf published 71 mathematics papers and was the advisor to ten doctoral students. Highlights of her research contributions include the solution of four problems of Alexander Grothendieck and of a conjecture of Dmitriĭ A. Raĭkov. Her work often involved the construction of counterexamples, for which she became known as "Mrs. Counterexample".

Beyond the main part of her work on topological vector spaces, she was also a coauthor of a book on topological group theory, Uniform structures on topological groups and their quotients (with Walter Roelcke, McGraw-Hill, 1981).

== Recognition ==
A special volume of the journal Functiones et Approximatio Commentarii Mathematici was published in Dierolf's memory in 2011.
