= Susanne Gubler =

Swiss footballer

Personal information
- Date of birth: 13 July 1965 (age 61)
- Position: Midfielder

International career
Years	Team	Apps	(Gls)
	Switzerland	44	

Susanne Gubler (born 13 July 1965) is a retired Swiss footballer who played for FC Bern and the Switzerland national team.

Since retiring from professional football, Gubler became a coach of FC Basel's women's team. In her first season, she won the Swiss Super League.
