= Marie-Claire Zimmermann =

Austrian journalist and television presenter

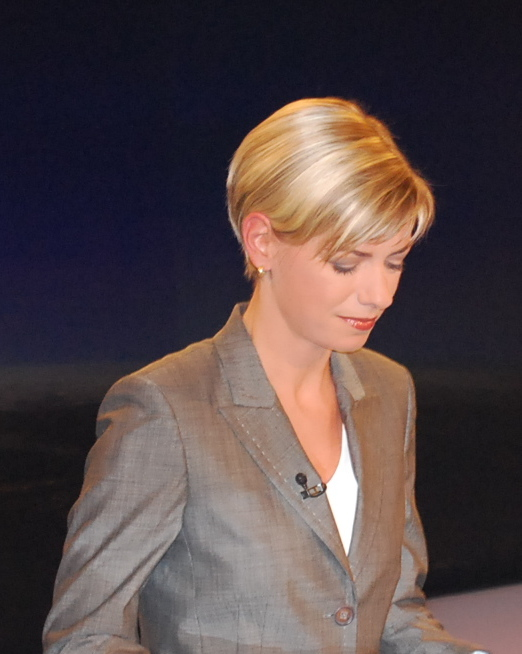
Zimmermann photographed in 2008

Marie-Claire Zimmermann (born 10 June 1975 in Vienna, Austria) is an Austrian journalist and television presenter, who presents Austrian TV program Zeit im Bild. She is the sister of Carsten-Pieter Zimmermann.
