= Susanne Fröhlich =

German author and journalist

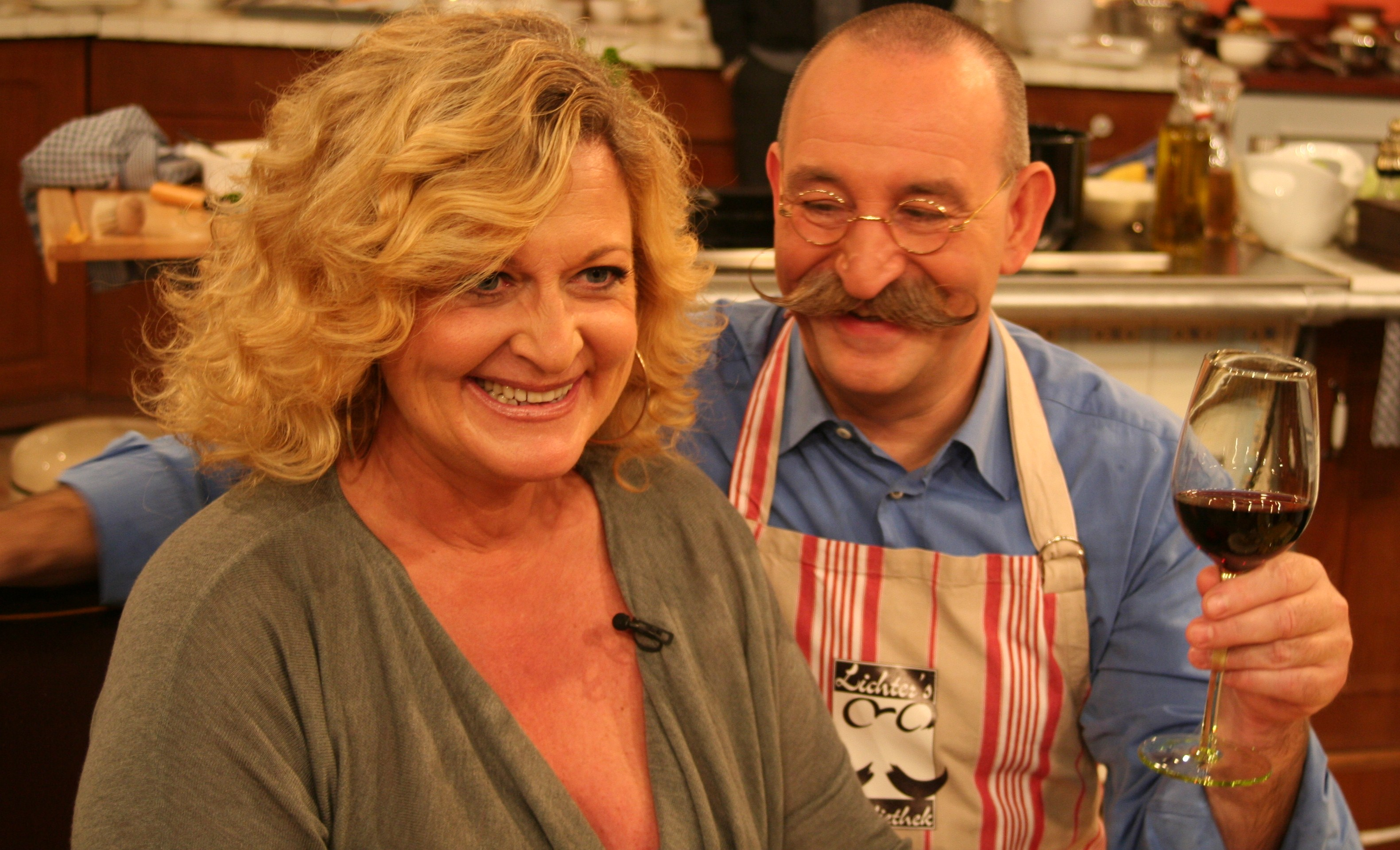
- Fröhlich (left) with Horst Lichter in the show Lafer! Lichter! Lecker! in 2010
- Born: 15 November 1962 (age 63); Frankfurt, Hesse, Germany
- Occupations: Journalist; Author
- Partner: Gert Scobel (until 2008)
- Children: 2

Susanne Fröhlich (born 15 November 1962) is a German author and journalist.

== Life and career ==
Susanne Fröhlich was born on 15 November 1962 in Frankfurt, the daughter of a Frankfurt notary. In 1982 she graduated from the Schillerschule in Frankfurt. After dropping out of law studies (4 semesters) and doing an internship, Fröhlich made his debut at Hessischer Rundfunk (radio) in 1984. From 1988 to summer 2007 she hosted the game on hr3. On television she presented Allein oder Fröhlich, Vorsicht Fröhlich, Fröhlich bei Nacht and Wir vier. She was a regular guest at Blond am Freitag and in the hr quiz show strassenstars.

In the meantime, Fröhlich has published several books that have sold more than a million times. Her first novel Frisch gepresst is about a woman named Andrea Schnidt, who is about to become a mother. Diana Amft played the leading role in the 2012 film adaptation of the same name. Other episodes from this series are: Frisch gemacht, Familienpackung, Treuepunkte, Lieblingsstücke and Lackschaden. The book Jeder Fisch ist schön, wenn er an der Angel hängt is aimed at female singles. In her novel Der Tag, an dem Vater das Baby fallen ließ, the mother of the deceased baby throws the father out and begins a lesbian relationship with the caregiver. In 2004, Fröhlich's biggest book success so far, Moppel-Ich, was published, a guide that deals with weight problems in a humorous way. A television film was also made based on this book.

Susanne Fröhlich moderates the book show Fröhlichlesen on MDR television. She is part of the Südwestrundfunk (SWR) show Ich trage einen großen Namen on the advice team. She is also a regular part of the advice team for the show strassenstars on hr-fernsehen.

== Personal life ==
Susanne Fröhlich lived with the TV presenter Gert Scobel, whom she had met during their joint traineeship at the Hessischer Rundfunk. They have been separated since summer 2008. The two have two children.

Susanne Fröhlich likes to jog, do yoga and do cross-country skiing.

== Works ==
=== Books ===
- Frisch gepresst. Eichborn, Frankfurt am Main 1998, ISBN 3-8218-0570-6
- Der Tag, an dem Vater das Baby fallen ließ. Eichborn, Frankfurt am Main 2001, ISBN 3-8218-0826-8
- Frisch gemacht!. Krüger, Frankfurt am Main 2003, ISBN 3-8105-0663-X
- Familienpackung. Krüger, Frankfurt am Main 2005, ISBN 3-8105-0664-8
- Moppel-Ich. Der Kampf mit den Pfunden. Krüger, Frankfurt am Main 2004, ISBN 3-8105-0666-4 (Platz 1 der Spiegel-Bestsellerliste vom 7. Juni bis zum 25. Juli und vom 2. August bis zum 17. Oktober 2004)
- Treuepunkte. Krüger, Frankfurt am Main 2006, ISBN 3-8105-0670-2
- Lieblingsstücke. Roman. Krüger, Frankfurt am Main 2008, ISBN 978-3-8105-0672-6
- Und ewig grüßt das Moppel-Ich. Krüger, Frankfurt am Main 2010, ISBN 978-3-8105-0679-5
- Der Hund, die Krähe, das Om... und ich! Mein Yoga-Tagebuch. Gräfe und Unzer, München 2011, ISBN 978-3-8338-2498-2
- Lackschaden. Krüger, Frankfurt am Main 2012, ISBN 978-3-8105-0673-3
- Aufgebügelt. Krüger, Frankfurt am Main 2013, ISBN 978-3-8105-0674-0
- Wundertüte. Krüger, Frankfurt am Main 2015, ISBN 978-3-8105-2259-7
- Feuerprobe. Krüger, Frankfurt am Main 2016, ISBN 978-3-8105-3023-3
- Verzogen. Krüger, Frankfurt am Main 2018, ISBN 978-3-8105-3024-0
- Ausgemustert. Knaur, München 2020, ISBN 978-3-4262-2707-7

with Constanze Kleis:

- Jeder Fisch ist schön – wenn er an der Angel hängt. Krüger, Frankfurt am Main 2002, ISBN 3-8105-0660-5
- F(r)ischhalteabkommen. Länger Freude am Mann. Krüger, Frankfurt am Main 2003, ISBN 3-8105-0665-6
- Langenscheidt Deutsch-Mann/Mann-Deutsch. Langenscheidt, München 2005, ISBN 3-468-73111-6
- Runzel-Ich. Wer schön sein will ... Krüger, Frankfurt am Main 2007, ISBN 3-8105-0668-0
- Alles über meine Mutter. Krüger, Frankfurt am Main 2007, ISBN 978-3-8105-0676-4
- Alles über meinen Vater. Krüger, Frankfurt am Main 2012, ISBN 978-3-8105-0677-1
- Diese schrecklich schönen Jahre. Gräfe und Unzer, München 2014, ISBN 978-3-8338-3415-8
- Frau Fröhlich sucht die Liebe ... und bleibt nicht lang allein. Krüger, Frankfurt am Main 2015, ISBN 978-3-8105-0669-6
- Kann weg! Frau Fröhlich räumt auf. Gräfe und Unzer, München 2017, ISBN 978-3-8338-6268-7

=== Audio books ===
- Frisch gepresst (2002), ISBN 3-8218-5201-1
- Frisch gemacht (2003), ISBN 3-89940-198-0
- Moppel-Ich. Der Kampf mit den Pfunden (2005), ISBN 3-89964-119-1
- Familienpackung (2005), ISBN 978-3-86610-266-8
- Treuepunkte (2006), ISBN 978-3-86610-319-1
- Lieblingsstücke (2008), ISBN 978-3-8398-9005-9
- Charlottes Welt (2009), ISBN 978-3-86610-960-5
- Und ewig grüßt das Moppel-Ich (2010), ISBN 978-3-8398-1017-0
- Lackschaden (2012), ISBN 978-3-8398-1148-1
- Der Hund, die Krähe, das Om ... und ich. Mein Yoga-Tagebuch (2012), ISBN 3-86804-219-9
- Wundertüte (2015), ISBN 978-3-8398-1372-0
- Feuerprobe (2016), ISBN 978-3-8398-1498-7
- Verzogen (2018), Argon Verlag GmbH, S. Fischer Verlag GmbH ISBN 978-3-8398-5315-3

with Constanze Kleis:

- Jeder Fisch ist schön – wenn er an der Angel hängt (2003), ISBN 3-8218-5240-2
- Langenscheidt Deutsch – Mann / Mann – Deutsch. Männerverstehen leicht gemacht (2003), ISBN 3-468-73108-6
- Runzel-Ich. Wer schön sein will ... (2007), ISBN 978-3-86610-552-2
- Kann weg! Frau Fröhlich räumt auf (2017), ISBN 978-3-8398-8147-7

== Literature ==
- Steffen Martus: „Für alle meine Freundinnen“. Multimediales Marketing von Bestsellern am Beispiel von Susanne Fröhlich. In: Kanon, Wertung und Vermittlung. Literatur in der Wissensgesellschaft. Hrsg. von Matthias Beilein, Claudia Stockinger, Simone Winko. De Gruyter, Berlin / Boston 2012, ISBN 978-3-11-025994-0, S. 261–278.
- Daniela Egert: Susanne Fröhlich. Abspeck-Expertin, Frankfurter Pflanze, Sprachathletin. kurz & bündig, Basel [2018], ISBN 9783907126059.
