= Basic Income Alliance =

German political party

Basic Income Alliance Bündnis Grundeinkommen
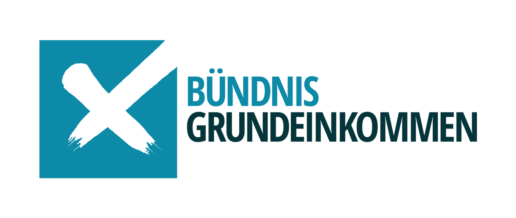
- Abbreviation: BGE
- Leader: Martin Sonnabend
- Founded: 25 September 2016; 8 years ago
- Headquarters: Driesener Straße 10; 10439 Berlin, Germany
- Ideology: Universal basic income

Website
- www.buendnis-grundeinkommen.de

The Basic Income Alliance (German: Bündnis Grundeinkommen, abbreviated BGE) is a German single-issue political party that advocates for an unconditional basic income. It was founded in September 2016 in Munich. The Basic Income Alliance gained 97,539 votes at the German federal election 2017 and reached 0.2%.

== Overview ==
The Basic Income Alliance sees an unconditional basic income as a central possibility to counteract what it sees as a widening income gap. Technical progress, the automation of production processes, the resulting unemployment and low-paid gainful employment lead to a division in society that must be overcome in order to maintain social peace.

== Election results ==
| Election | Chamber | Votes | Vote % | Seats |
|---|---|---|---|---|
| 2017 Saarland state election | State Landtag | 286 | ▲0.1% | 0 |
| 2017 North Rhine-Westphalia state election | State Landtag | 5,260 | ▲0.1% | 0 |
| 2017 German federal election | Bundestag | 97,539 | ▲0.2% | 0 |
| 2017 Lower Saxony state election | State Landtag | 5,125 | ▲0.1% | 0 |
| 2019 European Parliament election | European Parliament | 40,834 | ▲0.1% | 0 |
| 2019 Bremen state election | Bürgerschaft of Bremen | 5,939 | ▲0.4% | 0 |
| 2019 Thuringia state election | Landtag of Thuringia | 2,700 | ▲0.2% | 0 |

== Other "basic income parties" ==
There are a number of other political parties in other countries that are formed solely around a universal basic income proposal. These include:

- Basinkomstpartiet, Sweden
- The Basic Income Party, Korea (Korean: 기본소득당; Hanja: 基本所得黨)
- The Base (Dutch: De Basis)

Other political parties also include universal basic income among their policies but do not exclusively focus on it.

== See also ==
- Universal basic income in Germany
