= Susanne Kessler =

Susanne Kessler (1955 in Wuppertal) is a German – Italian painter, illustrator and installation artist.

== Life ==
From 1975–1982 Susanne Kessler studied painting and graphic at the Berlin University of the Arts and the Royal College of Art (RCA) in London. In 2022 she was awarded the Von der Heydt Culture Prize and in 1992 she won the Paul Strecker Award of the City of Mainz. In addition to scholarships and artist residencies more than 50 solo exhibitions and numerous group exhibitions have taken her throughout Europe and to India, Pakistan, Mali Ethiopia, Guatemala, Iran, Latvia and the USA (Turlock, CA, Washington, DC, New York, NY, Charlottesville, VA). 2001/2002 she has served as a guest professor at the California State University – Stanislaus, USA, followed to the Latvian Academy of Arts in Riga, Latvia in 2010 and to the City University of New York, NY, USA in 2011. Susanne Kessler lives in Berlin/Germany and Rome/Italy.

== Work ==
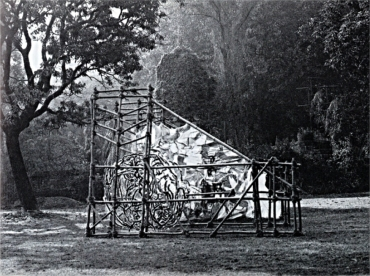
Susanne Kessler, The universe moves, India 1995

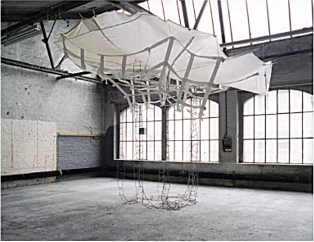
Susanne Kessler, survival kit, 2005

Susanne Kessler creates expansive, organic-like installations. Primarily based on drawing, she has been concentrating on natural, living structures for many years. Some of her work is dedicated to imagery of the internal organs like the human brain, with its visual appearance and its inner complex structure. According to Kessler, only the limitation to the brain, with individual thinking and visualizing, promotes an "ego-construction", which moves away from science and into an artistic world.

Thought fragments and trains of thoughts that deal continually with biological models are often integrated by Kessler into a system of drawings, forming a complex net of overlapping patterns and poetic content. In the center of her work the Wheel of Life, the principle of life, is made visible as a flow of vital energy, as an ever-changing process reflecting at the same time the work process of the artist. Series of drawings are constantly involved in new installations in order to renew from within. This results include spaces of graphic signs and symbols, integrating some of the kinetic energy of the location.

These biological models have revealed themselves, for example, in organic forms cut out of Tyvek paper.

== Awards and scholarships ==
- 2022 Von der Heydt-Kulturpreis
- 2020 Scholarship Europa of the Senate of Berlin
- 2016–2018 Artist in Residence, Kunstmuseum der Westküste, MKdW, Alkersum/Föhr
- 2014 Artist in Residence, Art Students League Sparkill, NY/USA
- 2014 Ruth Katzman Award, New York, NY/USA
- 2011 Visiting Professor and Artist in Residence, City University of New York/USA
- 2010 Guest Lecturer and Artist in Residence, Art Academy Riga/LT
- 2008 International Symposium "Dialogue", Art Academy, Riga/LT
- 2007 Artist in Residence, Second Street Gallery, Charlottesville, VA/USA
- 2005 Member of the "viewing programs, artist registry" and invitation to "Artist Talk" to "The Drawing Center New York, NYC/USA
- 2003 Artist in Residence, Fajr Festival, Tehran/IR
- 2001–2002 Visiting Professor and Artist in Residence, California State University, Stanislaus, CA/USA.
- 1996 Max Mueller Bhavan, Hyderabad, Mumbai, Chennai/IND
- 1996 Goethe-Institut Lahore/PK
- 1995–1996 Artist in Residence, Lalit Kala Academy, New Delhi/IND
- 1995 Grant from the city of Goslar Kaiser Ring/GER
- 1992 Paul Strecker Award, Mainz/GER
- 1984 Scholarship from the German-French Youth Office, Paris/F
- 1982 DAAD Fellowship, Royal College of Art, London/UK

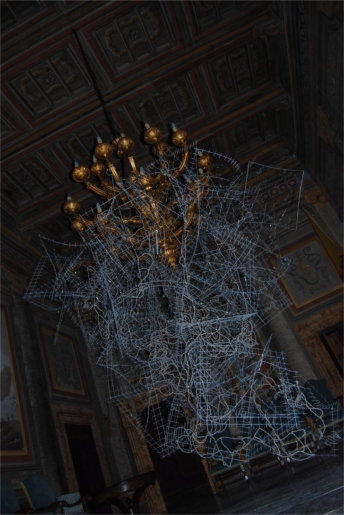
Susanne Kessler, installazione illuminata, Viterbo 2009

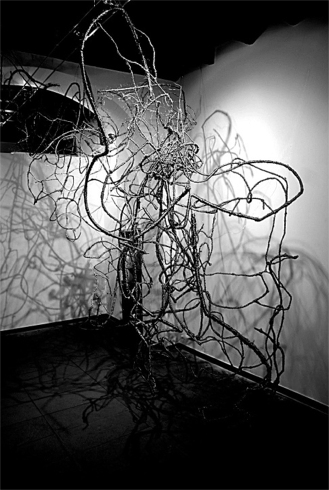
Susanne Kessler, disegno spaziale, Galleria Dora Diamanti, Rome 2008

== Exhibitions (selection) ==
- 2022: Ozean, Kunstverein Würzburg, Würzburg, DE
- 2022: About Roots and Borders, Conseil de l’Europe, Strassburg, FR
- 2021: Undated, Kunstverein Lippstadt, Lippstadt, DE
- 2019: Kontinuum, (mit Guda Koster) Kunstforum der Sparkasse Wuppertal, DE
- 2019: Wechselspiel, (mit Paolo Bielli), GAM, Galleria Arte Moderna, Rome, IT
- 2019: Odissea, Gallery Neon, Geppert Academy of Art, Wroclaw, PL
- 2018: Mappa Mundi, MACRO, Museo Arte Contemporaneo, Rome, IT
- 2018: Odissea, MKdW, Kunstmuseum der Westküste, Alkersum/Föhr, DE
- 2016: Scudi, Sala Santa Rita, Rome, IT
- 2015 WHITECONCEPTS, Berlin, GER
- 2015 American University Museum at the Katzen Arts Center, Washington / DC, USA (cat.)
- 2015 CARLsGARTEN, Cologne, GER
- 2015 Off Course / Gallery Antonio Nardone, Brussels, BE
- 2015 Santa Lucia del Gonfalone, Rome, IT
- 2015 Winterausstellung15, VBK- Verein Berliner Kuenstler, Berlin, GER
- 2015 The Arlington Art Center, Arlington, VA, USA
- 2015 Kunstverein Artlantis, Bad Homburg, GER
- 2015 The Elisabteh Foundation for the Arts New York, NY, USA
- 2015 XLVIII Premio Vasto, Scuderia di Palazzo Aragona, Vasto, IT (cat.)
- 2015 Cittadellarte - Fondazione Pistoletto, Biella, IT
- 2015 Gallery Monserrato Arte, Rome, IT (cat.)
- 2014 Gallery Rotunda, Uniwersytetu Artystucznego / University of Art, (with Marek Jakuszewski), Poznan, PL
- 2014 DominoArt 2014, Reutlingen, GER (cat.)
- 2014 Art Museum Solingen, Solingen, GER
- 2014 The League Residency at Vyt, Sparkill / NY, USA
- 2014 Open Center, New York / NY, USA
- 2014 Castello dell’Abate / Belvedere, Castellabate, IT (cat.)
- 2014 Basilica di San Giovanni a Cimitile, Nola, IT
- 2014 OSTRALE´014, Dresden, GER (cat.)
- 2014 WHITECONCEPTS, Berlin, GER
- 2014 European Parliament, Altiero Spinelli Building, Brussels, BE
- 2013 MAAM (Museo dell'Altro e dell’Altrove di Metropoliz), Rome, IT (cat.)
- 2013 Gallery Civica d’Arte Contemporanea, Casacalenda, IT (cat.)
- 2013 Accademia di Romania, Rome, IT
- 2013 ACA Galleries, New York, USA
- 2013 Anya and Andrew Shiva Gallery, New York, USA
- 2013 Il Frantoio, Capalbio, IT
- 2013 project space of the German Artist League (Deutscher Künstlerbund), Berlin, GER
- 2013 Bibliothé Gallery d’Arte Contemporanea, Rome, IT
- 2013 Gallery Monserrato Arte, Rome, IT
- 2012 Museo Aperto 2012, Casacalenda, IT
- 2012 site specific exhibition in containers, Thun, CH (cat.)
- 2011 Gallery M, Berlin, GER (cat.)
- 2011 Monty & Company, Rome, IT
- 2011 Gallery Palladino Company, Campobasso, IT (cat.)
- 2011 Gallery Cortese e Lisante, Rome, IT
- 2011 Gallery Civica d’Arte Contemporanea, Termoli, IT (cat.)
- 2011 Gallery Dora Diamanti, Rome, IT
- 2011 Washington Project for the Arts, Washington/USA
- 2010 ex-GIL, Rome/IT
- 2010 Museo Faina and Ex-convento di San Giovanni, Orvieto/IT (solo)
- 2010 WHITECONCEPTS, Berlin/GER
- 2009 Gallery Epikur, Wuppertal/GER (solo)
- 2009 Gallery Inga Kondeyne, Berlin/GER
- 2008 Galleria Dora Diamanti, Rome/IT (solo)
- 2008 John Jay University Gallery, City University New York, NY/USA (solo)
- 2007 Second Street Gallery, Charlottesville, VA/USA (solo, site-specific)
- 2005 Nassauischer Kunstverein Wiesbaden/GER
- 2005 American Association of the Advancement of Science, Washington DC (in cooperation with the Goethe Institut Washington/USA) (solo)
- 2003 Fajr Festival, Taleghani Artist Forum, Tehran/IR (solo)
- 2001 Gustav Lübke Museum Hamm/GER (solo)
- 2000 Cantieri alla Zisa / Goethe Institut Palermo/IT (solo)
- 1999 Beuys Archive-Museum Moyland Castle/GER (solo)
- 1995 Mönchehaus Museum of Contemporary Art, Goslar/GER (solo)
- 1995 Von der Heydt Museum, Wuppertal/GER (solo)
- 1994 Municipal Gallery, Albstadt/GER (solo)
- 1992 National Museum Mainz/GER (solo)

== Literature ==
- 1993 Bonito Oliva, Achille: Gran Delubro, L’Arte. Edizione Carte Segrete, Exhibition Erice, La Salerniana, Ex Convento di San Carlo, Italy
- 1995 Becker, Wolfgang: The Burden of the Bunker- transforming a line of defense. In: Fredsskulptur 1995. Elle-Mie Ejdrup Hansen
- 1996 Matusche, Petra: Inner Energies and Outer Spaces. In: Susanne Kessler in India and Pakistan 1995–1996. Exhibition Max Mueller Bhavan, Hyderabad, Madras, Lait Kala Academi, New Delhi, India, Goethe Institut Lahore, Pakistan; Museum Abtei Liesborn. ISBN 81-900739-0-7
- 2003 Karshenas, Majid: Love resurrects humanity. In: Susanne Kessler – Persian Diary. Exhibition Artist Forum Taleghani, 2003 Tehran, Iran. ISBN 3-86611-024-3
- 2008 Farrington, Lisa: The Art of Dualities. In: Susanne Kessler, Drawing Space – The New York Room. Exhibition City University – John Jay Gallery, New York, NY, USA
- 2010 Canova, Lorenzo: La rete segreta della cose. In Ritmo e Linea. Exhibition Ex- Convento di San Giovanni, Orvieto, Italy
- 2010 Canova, Lorenzo. Sbandati. Mostra Ex-GIL Roma, Italy, Edizione riverberi sonori.
- 2011 Karin Scheel: Susanne Kessler: Baustelle Zeichnung. Galerie M, Berlin Palladino Editore, ISBN 978-88-8460-206-0
- 2014 Wolfgang Riehle, Raimund Stecker: Susanne Kessler: Mäander, DominoArt 2014
- 2015 Achille Bonito Oliva, Johannes Nathan, Vincenzo Mazarella: Susanne Kessler: Framing Space, Distanz Verlag Berlin, ISBN 978-3-95476-119-7
- 2018 Beniamini Quintieri, Alberto Dambruoso: Susanne Kessler: Ulysses in Cosenza, Gangemi Editore Int. Roma, ISBN 978-88-492-3614-9
- 2018 Ed. Boyens Verlag: Susanne Kessler: 99 Days around Cape Horn..., Museum Art of the West Coast
- 2018 lrike Wolff -Thomsen: Susanne Kessler: Odissea, Boyens Verlag, ISBN 978-3-8042-1499-6
- 2020 Kathrin Merkle, Sabine Urban, Christoph Tannert: Susanne Kessler: about roots and borders, Artinflow Verlag, Berlin, ISBN 978-3-938457-55-9
