= Susanne Wetzel =

German computer scientist and professor

Gudrun Susanne Wetzel is a German computer scientist known for her work in computer security, including the use of information channels such as voice or keystroke dynamics to strengthen password-based security, and the security of wireless communications standards including Bluetooth and GSM. She is a professor of computer science at the Stevens Institute of Technology.

== Education and career ==
Wetzel earned a diploma from the Karlsruhe Institute of Technology in 1993, and completed her doctorate (Dr. rer. nat.) at Saarland University in 1998. Her dissertation, Lattice Basis Reduction Algorithms and their Applications, concerned lattice reduction; her doctoral advisor was Johannes Buchmann.

She joined the Stevens Institute of Technology in 2002. In 2017, she served a one-year term as a program director at the National Science Foundation.
