= Armin Wolf =

Austrian journalist

- Wolf in 2026
- Born: 19 August 1966 (age 60); Innsbruck, Tyrol, Austria
- Education: University of Vienna, University of Innsbruck
- Occupations: News presenter; journalist
- Known for: Anchorman at the ORF
- Spouses: Birgit Fenderl (m. 2001; div. 2004) Euke Frank (m. 2008)

Armin Wolf (German: [ˈaːɐ̯mɪn vɔlf]; born 19 August 1966) is an Austrian journalist and television anchor. In 2017 Politico Europe called him "one of Europe’s most skilled (and feared) political journalists". He was named "European Journalist of the Year 2019" at the Prix Europa media contest.

== Early life and education ==
Born in Innsbruck, Tyrol, Wolf took his Matura at a business school in Innsbruck. He graduated from the University of Vienna with a master's degree and from the University of Innsbruck with a doctorate in political science. In 2010 he earned an MBA degree at the Berlin School of Creative Leadership at Steinbeis University in Berlin.

== Career ==
Wolf began his broadcasting career in 1985 as a freelance reporter for ORF, Austria's public broadcasting company. In 1987 he moved to Vienna as a reporter and editor for foreign affairs at ORF's premier radio station Ö1. In 1991/92 he was based in Washington D.C. as U.S. correspondent. From 1995 to 2002 he was political editor, chief correspondent and managing editor of various TV news programs at ORF.

Since 2002, Wolf has been presenting ORF's news show ZIB 2, presently alternating with Martin Thür and Marie-Claire Zimmermann. ZIB 2 is being broadcast Mondays through Fridays and has a market share of up to approximately 30 percent. In 2018, he interviewed Russian president Vladimir Putin.

In addition, Wolf has published three books on political communication and taught courses in political science at the universities of Vienna and Innsbruck.

== Recognition ==
For his interviews Wolf has been distinguished with several awards, e.g. Austria's "Journalist of the Year" 2004 and 2018 and four Romy awards as Austria's most popular TV anchor in 2006, 2007, 2012, and 2019. For Austria's most popular Twitter account he was elected "Onliner of the Year" in the Media category by visitors to the web site werbeplanung.at and by visitors to werbeplanung.at's Facebook page in 2011. He was elected "Communicator of the Year" 2012 by visitors to the web site of the Public Relations Association Austria. Prestigious German awards include the following:

- 2019 – Preis für die Freiheit und Zukunft der Medien (Leipzig)
- 2018 – Grimme-Preis (Special Award)
- 2016 – Hanns-Joachim-Friedrichs-Preis

== Personal life ==
Since 2008, Wolf lives with his wife - Austrian journalist Euke Frank - and her two children in Vienna. Frank is a former editor-in-chief of the Woman magazine. From 2001 to 2004 Wolf was married to ORF presenter Birgit Fenderl.

Wolf's great-grandfather was mountaineer and canon lawyer Viktor Wolf von Glanvell.

== Publications ==
- with Euke Frank: Promi-Politik. Prominente Quereinsteiger im Porträt (2006)
