= Susanne Lanefelt =

Swedish health expert

Susanne Lanefelt (born 24 September 1946) is a Swedish health and workout expert. During one of her early trips to the US she got inspired by Jane Fondas workout programs, and she decided to start workout groups in her parents basement. Later she was discovered by TV producer Annchristin Gjers, whom offered her to present a training and workout show on SVT. The show "Gymping" was first broadcast in 1983, the show aired until 1987. She became known for saying on her show that the people that home watching "should squeeze".

In 2008, Lanefelt was a celebrity dancer on Let's Dance 2008 which was broadcast on TV4. She also works as a speaker for health and exercise, and in 2018 she released the mobile app Sussi Kanin which focuses on increasing exercise by children in Sweden.

== Bibliography ==
- Gjers Annechristine, Lanefelt Susanne, red (1983). Gymping. Stockholm: SVT.
- Gjers Annechristine, Lanefelt Susanne, red (1986). Gymping. 2. Stockholm: SVT.
- Lanefelt, Susanne; Gjers Annechristine (1984). Susanne Lanefelts gympingbok: hälsa, kost, skönhet och motion. Stockholm: Lindblad. ISBN 91-32-31216-4
- Lanefelt, Susanne; Lefterow Annette (2000). Ditt liv: ditt val - din möjlighet. Farsta: SISU idrottsböcker. ISBN 9188940837
- Lanefelt, Susanne; Gjers Annechristine, Björkman Margareta (2008). Susanne Lanefelts gympingbok hälsa, kost, skönhet och motion. Enskede: TPB.
