= Susanne Amatosero =

German writer

- Born: Susanne Klippel; 29 July 1952 (age 74); Wittlich, West Germany
- Education: University of Fine Arts of Hamburg
- Occupations: Writer; director; photographer
- Writing career
- Genres: Radio drama

Susanne Amatosero (born Susanne Klippel, 29 July 1952) is a Hamburg-based German artist and a writer/director of stage and radio dramas.

== Biography ==
Susanne Kippel was born at Wittlich, a small town between Trier and Koblenz. She later moved north, studying painting at the University of Fine Arts of Hamburg, following which she worked as a freelance photographer, contributing to national publications such as Zeit and Stern. Starting in 1983 she undertook a succession of lengthy visits to the Caribbean - notably St. Lucia, Grenada and Jamaica - in order to undertake cultural comparative and ethnographic studies. That gave rise to her first documentary film, "Die Reise der Pilgrim Number One" ("Journey of the Number One Pilgrim"), which won a special prize at the 1988 Paris Film Festival.

Since 1989 the focus of her writing has been on radio plays, the productions of which she usually undertakes herself. The "sounds and noises" incorporated in these are a particular feature. Her 1996 Bayerischer Rundfunk ("Bavarian Broadcasting") production of "Funky Yard" won the gold medal at the 1997 "International Radio Festival of New York".

== Personal ==
Susanne Amatosero's younger brother is the author Christian Klippel.

== Works (selection) ==
=== Books ===
- Emilie Meier: lieber sich gesund schimpfen als krank heulen – bande dessinée (as Susanne Klippel), Munich 1977, Frauenbuchverlag (nowadays Verlag Antje Kunstmann)
- Schwarz war ihr Haar, die Augen wie zwei Sterne so klar: Frauen in St. Pauli (as Susanne Klippel), Munich 1979, Frauenbuchverlag
- Mit Schwund muaßt rechnen! – Geschichten vom Münchner Müllberg (as Susanne Klippel), Munich 1980, Blatt GmbH
- StraßenRandBilder (as Susanne Klippel), München 1981, Frauenbuchverlag

=== Films ===
- Die Reise der Pilgrim Number One, 1987 documentary film
- Starkstrom, Television film, 1992 (as Susanne Klippel) (first broadcast: 15 September 1992, ZDF)

=== Radio dramas ===
- Die Buchstabenhütte, 1989 (as Susanne Klippel) NDR
- Ein ziemlich milder Winter, 1990 (as Susanne Klippel) NDR/BR
- 38,0 Grad, 1991 (as Susanne Klippel) NDR
- Misses Patience geht aus dem Haus, 1993 (as Susanne Klippel) NDR
- Apollo Hotel, 1994 (as Susanne Klippel) NDR
- Delta, 1995 NDR/SR (awarded Hörspiel des Monats (radio play of the month) of the Deutsche Akademie der Darstellenden Künste in March 1996)
- funky yard, 1996 DLR/BR
- Flieg, Gedanke auf goldenen Schwingen, 1966 (Regie; Author: Armando Llamass, translation: Hans Thill) SR
- Phönixhouse, 1997 NDR/BR
- Der Mond hält Hof oder Die Struktur des wilden Schnittlauchs in der Nacht, 1997 (Regie; Autorin: Marietta Schröder) SR
- Licht, 1998 BR/NDR
- Asylanten, 1999 DLR/SR/NDR
- 5 Gesänge, 2000 DLR
- Art aud, 2002 NDR
- The Girl from Ipanema in Dub, 2003 DLR/NDR
- Fool's Büttel, 2004 NDR/DLR
- Fremde Männer rocken das Haus, 2004 DLR/HR
- Flamme und Phon, 2005 NDR
- Klagenfurt, 2007 DLR/NDR/SWR
- Von Menschen, die sich fressen oder All You Can Eat, 2008 (Regie; Author: Paula Köhlmeier) WDR/ORF/DLR
- Die Palette, 2010 (Regie; Author: Hubert Fichte) NDR
- Global Player, 2008 DLR
- Voodoo Child und die Musik als fünftes Element, 2011 DLR
- Mercury, 2012 NDR/DLR
- Sparky, 2013 DLR
- ABCDE und ich, 2014 NDR
- Portrait of the Artist as a young Bitch, 2016 NDR
