= Susanne Stemmer (artist) =

Austrian visual artist

Susanne Stemmer (born 1973) is an Austrian visual artist, director and photographer.

== Life and work ==
Stemmer was born in Feldkirch, Austria. She became a professional photographer in her early adulthood.

After her matura in 1992 she went to Afram Plains District in Ghana to work in development aid, followed by being a photographer on a cruise ship and opening her first photographic studio in Vienna in 2005. Later, alongside her job as a commercial fashion photographer for companies such as Louis Vuitton, Chanel and Swarovski, she started developing her artistic style, especially in her free works. Her most famous works were created in the world of artistic underwater photography where she stages the depicted characters in dreamy, seemingly weightless underwater worlds to create a feeling of freedom, self-reflection and detachment from reality. She achieves these effects, for example, through long durations of exposure and playing with natural and artificial lighting.

In addition to exhibitions at biennales and festivals, Stemmer also presents her works in solo exhibitions worldwide, for instance in her pop-up galleries in Vienna and Paris, where her photography is shown for one day only. In her video installations, which are projected in large format on facades, the focus is on underwater visuals too, such as her work Beneath, presented on the occasion of Venice Biennale 2017 and at Nuit Blanche Paris 2018, as well as Beneath II two years later onto the building of the Austrian Economic Chamber (WKO) in Vienna. Furthermore, she is active as a director in the advertising industry and in her underwater art film series Under Surfaces.

Stemmer lives and works in Vienna, Paris and travelling the world.

== Exhibitions (selection) ==
- 2014: Wide Painting Off The Wall, Cipriani Wall Street, New York City (solo exhibition)
- 2014: Festival International de la Photographie, Cannes (group exhibition)
- 2015: Paris Photo LA, Los Angeles (group exhibition)
- 2016: Rencontres d'Arles, Arles (group exhibition)
- 2017: Alchemic Body – Fire.Air.Water.Earth, Bogotá (group exhibition)
- 2017: Venice Biennale, Venice (group exhibition)
- 2018: Nuit Blanche, Paris (group exhibition)
