= Susanne Stemmer (physicist) =

Materials scientist and physicist

Susanne Stemmer is a materials scientist and physicist who serves as a Distinguished Professor in the Materials Department at the University of California, Santa Barbara (UCSB).

== Research ==
Susanne Stemmer's research focuses on the development of novel thin-film materials, high-resolution scanning transmission electron microscopy (STEM), and the study of strongly correlated electron systems. She has worked on quantum materials, including the observation of rare electronic states such as zero-field Wigner solids.

== Education and career ==
Stemmer earned her Diploma in Engineering and Materials Science from the Friedrich-Alexander University of Erlangen-Nuremberg in Germany. She subsequently obtained her Ph.D. from the University of Stuttgart.

Following her doctoral studies, she held research positions at the Max Planck Institute for Metals Research and the University of California, Berkeley, before joining the faculty at the University of Illinois at Chicago as an assistant professor. In 2002, she joined the Materials Department at UCSB.

== Selected publications ==
- Evidence of Zero-Field Wigner Solids in Ultrathin Films of Cadmium Arsenide (2024)
- Observation of the Quantum Hall Effect in Confined Films of the Three-Dimensional Dirac Semimetal Cd 3⁢As 2 (2018)
- High-mobility BaSnO3 Grown by Oxide Molecular Beam Epitaxy (2016)
- Two-dimensional Electron Gases at Complex Oxide Interfaces (2014)
- Molecular Beam Epitaxy of SrTiO3 with a Growth Window (2009)
- Experimental quantification of annular dark-field images in scanning transmission electron microscopy (2008)
- Enhanced Gas Sensing by Individual SnO2 Nanowires and Nanobelts Functionalized with Pd Catalyst Particles (2005)
- Quantitative Atomic Resolution Scanning Transmission Electron Microscopy (2008)

== Awards ==
- Vannevar Bush Faculty Fellow
- Fellow of Microscopy Society of America
- Fellow of the American Physical Society (APS)
- Fellow of the Materials Research Society (MRS)
- Fellow of the American Ceramic Society
