= List of radio stations in Austria =

This is a list of radio stations operating in Austria. The Austrian regulatory agency (Kommunikationsbehörde Austria) acts as frequency assignment authority.

== Austria ==
=== Public broadcasting ===
- ORF (Österreichischer Rundfunk)
  - Österreich 1
    - Ö1 International (shortwave)
  - Österreich 2 - regional radio
    - Radio Burgenland: Burgenland
    - Radio Kärnten: Carinthia
    - Radio Niederösterreich: Lower Austria
    - Radio Oberösterreich: Upper Austria
    - Radio Salzburg: Salzburg
    - Radio Steiermark: Styria
    - Radio Tirol: Tyrol and South Tyrol
    - Radio Vorarlberg: Vorarlberg
    - Radio Wien: Vienna
  - Hitradio Ö3
  - FM4

=== Commercial broadcasters ===
- Supra-regional
  - Klassik Radio: nationwide via DAB+ and DVB-S
  - JÖ Live Radio: nationwide via DAB+
  - KroneHit
  - Radio Arabella network: Vienna, Lower Austria, Upper Austria, nationwide via DAB+
  - LoungeFM
  - oe24 Radio (formerly Radio Ö24, Antenne Wien and Radio Austria, Fellner Group)
  - ERF Süd: nationwide via DAB+
  - Antenne Österreich network (Fellner Group)
    - Antenne Austria
    - Antenne Salzburg
    - Antenne Tirol
  - Welle 1 network: Salzburg, Linz/Wels, Graz, Carinthia (former Radio Harmonie)
  - NRJ Group network: Vienna, Salzburg, Tyrol, nationwide via DAB+
  - Radio Flamingo: nationwide via DAB+
  - Radio One: nationwide via DAB+
  - Rock Antenne Österreich: nationwide via DAB+
- Regional
  - Vienna and Lower Austria
    - Radio 88.6
    - 98.3 superfly
    - Radio Stephansdom, operated by the Archdiocese of Vienna
  - Carinthia
    - Antenne Kärnten (Styria Media Group)
    - Radio Real, Radenthein
    - Radio Uno, Klagenfurt
  - Salzburg
    - Antenne Salzburg
    - Radio Alpina
  - Styria
    - Antenne Steiermark (Styria Media Group)
    - Njoy Radio
    - Radio Soundportal
    - Radio Grün-Weiß
    - Radio Eins
  - Tyrol
    - Antenne Tirol
    - Welle 1 (Innsbruck)
    - Klassik Radio
    - Life Radio
    - Radio Osttirol (East Tyrol, former Radio Grizzly)
    - U1 Radio Unterland
    - Energy 99.9 (NRJ Group)
  - Upper Austria
    - Life Radio
  - Vorarlberg
    - Antenne Vorarlberg

=== Community stations ===
- Radio Maria Austria
- Res.Radio (Vienna/Online)
- Community radio stations organised in the Verband Freier Radios Österreich (VFRÖ) organisation:
  - Radio AGORA (Klagenfurt)
  - B138 (Kirchdorf an der Krems)
  - Campus & City Radio (St. Pölten)
  - Radio Freequenns (Liezen)
  - Freies Radio Innsbruck (Innsbruck)
  - Freies Radio Freistadt (Freistadt)
  - Radio FRO 105.0 (Linz)
  - Freies Radio Salzkammergut (Bad Ischl)
  - radio Ypsilon (Hollabrunn)
  - Radio Helsinki (Graz)
  - Orange 94.0 (Vienna)
  - Radio Proton (Dornbirn)
  - Radiofabrik 107,5 (Salzburg)
  - Radio OP (Oberpullendorf)
- Campus radio stations
  - Campus & City Radio (University of Applied Sciences, Sankt Pölten)
  - Radius 106,6 (Gymnasium Freistadt)

== Former stations ==
- Rot-Weiß-Rot and Blue Danube Network, operated by the US Forces in Austria 1945–1955
- Radio Österreich International (1955–2003, today Radio Ö1 International)
- Blue Danube Radio (1979–2000, nationwide from 1992)
- Radio 1476 (1997–2008)
- Ö1 Inforadio (internet, until April 2011)

== See also ==
- Media of Austria
