= Ernst Grissemann =

Austrian radio host, journalist, and actor (1934–2023)

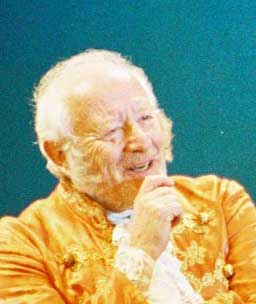
- Grissemann in 2004
- Born: 18 February 1934; Imst, Austria
- Died: 6 January 2023 (aged 88); Vienna, Austria
- Occupations: Radio host, journalist, actor

Ernst Grissemann (18 February 1934 – 6 January 2023) was an Austrian radio host, journalist, and actor.

== Biography ==
Grissemann began his career in radio in 1954 with Sendergruppe West in the French occupation of Austria. The following year, the station was absorbed by ORF.

In 1967, Grissemann moved to Vienna at the invitation of Gerd Bacher, with whom he co-founded Ö3 and Ö1. From 1979 to 1990, he served as director of ORF. From 1990 to 1994, he was director of Radio Tirol before once again directing ORF in November 1994.

Grissemann was ORF's commentator for most Eurovision Song Contest held from 1970 to 1998 and for the Vienna New Year's Concert from 1983 to 2007. In 1995, he became a freelance journalist for German-speaking radio and television, such as Tiroler Tageszeitung. From 1997 to 1998, he hosted the Sonntag bei Grissemann on Radio Wien. He hosted the radio show Schöner leben with Andrea Kiesling from 2000 to 2003.

He was the father of comedian and ORF broadcaster Christoph Grissemann, nephew to Oskar Grissemann (early ORF Bastelstunde radio broadcaster) and film critic Stefan Grissemann. Grissemann died in Vienna on 6 January 2023 at the age of 88.
