= Radio 1476 =

Austrian multicultural radio station

ORF Radio 1476

Programming
- Format: Multicultural/talk/variety

Ownership
- Owner: ORF

History
- First air date: 21 March 1997
- Last air date: 1 January 2009

Radio 1476 was an Austrian radio station, broadcast by the ORF, which allowed organizations and ethnic groups to share their programs. It was broadcast by the transmitter "Sender Bisamberg", on the frequency 1476 on medium wave, hence the name of the station. To extend to the programming offer, different program elements of Ö1 were used, as well as some productions made by the ORF.

== History ==
In 1933, a transmitter with a 100 kW performance was put in operation and was blown up in 1945, at the end of the Second World War by SS troops. In 1950 a provisional transmitter was built with a performance of 35 kW and only 9 years later, in 1959, the new radio station went on air with four 120 kW transmitters, which expanded in 1975 with another 600 kW transmitter. After the end of the Cold War ORF ended medium wave broadcasts.

Only two years later, in 1997, the radio station was restarted with the name "Radio 1476" using the same four old 120 kW-transmitters, but reduced power of just 60 kW. For the "Nachbar in Not" campaign, the 600 kW transmitter was turned on again. In 2000, the old 120 kW transmitters were replaced by a brand-new 100 kW transistor transmitter.

On January 1, 2009, "Radio 1476" was closed, after 12 years of broadcasting. It was replaced by oe1campus, a web-only station.

== Programming ==
When Radio 1476 was launched in 1997, the program consisted mostly of elements from Ö1 and other radio stations.

From May 3, 1999, the radio was very engaged with Nachbar in Not, a charity project for the Balkan area. After the re-commissioning of the 600 kW transmitter, it was possible to send information to the conflict areas in Yugoslavia, which were affected by the war.

Today, the program is very diverse and is compiled of many elements.

- From Ö1: "Evening journal", "Night Journal", "Midnight Journal", as well as the ORF news and some other programs
- From Ö1 International: News in Spanish
- From Radio Afrika: Different programs from the "Radio Afrika" project in Vienna offer service and information for African immigrants.
- Programs from different organizations and projects: Schülerradio, Radio Schöpfwerk, Freak Radio and Diesseits (a student radio by the "Katholische Medien Akademie Wien")
- Foreign language programs:
- Programs for the neighboring countries of Austria, in Czech, Slovak and Hungarian
- Programs for small Austrian ethnic groups in Romani, Croatian and Slovenian
- Folk music programs, such as Wienerisch g’spielt

The programming time was from 6 pm to 12:08 pm.

== Reception ==
The program was broadcast on medium wave, on 1476 kHz. The range of the radio was often underestimated, as a notification was received from Scandinavia, confirming the reception of Radio 1476. An internet stream was also available from their website.

== See also ==
- List of radio stations in Austria
