= Radio Österreich International =

Austrian international radio station

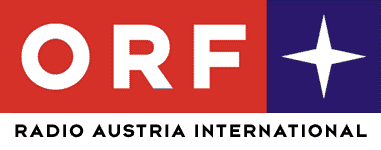
- Country: Austria

Ownership
- Owner: ORF
- Key people: Alexander Wrabetz

History
- Launch date: 1955
- Closed: 2003
- Replaced by: Ö1 International

Links
- Website: www.orf.at

Radio Österreich International (RÖI) (Austrian Radio International) was an international shortwave radio station broadcast by ORF. RÖI ceased operations in 2003.

== History ==
RÖI was launched in 1955 by order of the Federal Chancellery with the objective of increasing awareness of Austria in other countries. The radio station was broadcast worldwide on various shortwave frequencies. At the end of the 1990s, it was also broadcast on Astra Digital Radio. The station's headquarters and transmitters were located in Moosbrunn, on the outskirts of Vienna.

== Programming ==
RÖI programs were broadcast in different languages.

The most prominent programs were:

- Österreich-Journal (Austria Journal). Broadcast several times every day.
- Intermedia (since 4. April 1997, originally called Kurzwellenpanorama)
- Bundesländermagazin (magazine show covering the Austrian states)
- Report from Austria

RÖI News content was produced by various ORF national radio stations.

== Funding cancellation and closure ==
In 2000, the Federal Chancellery, under the cabinet Schüssel reduced the station's budget, leading to fewer programs. Some foreign offices also had to be closed. Despite budget cuts, ORF was able to complete a modernization program for both transmitters and station offices by the end of 2000.

In 2002 the Federal Chancellery ended financial support of the channel. ORF attempted to continue broadcasting and adopted a new schedule. To cut costs, existing recorded programs from other national broadcasters were rebroadcast - for example, including Radio Ö1, FM4 and Ö3. Regional station Ö2 contributed folk music.

At the end of 2003, despite protests from staff and members of the public, the National Board of Governors formally dissolved Radio Österreich International, ostensibly for financial reasons. ORF transmitters and offices are now leased to other international radio stations.

== Ö1 International ==
After the closure of Radio Österreich International, ORF continued to broadcast Radio Ö1 worldwide on shortwave, but with strongly reduced coverage and audio quality. Only one element from the old RÖI programme schedule remained: the Report from Austria. Report from Austria replaces the normal Ö1 schedule at various times during the day.

== Other foreign language productions ==
Other Austrian national broadcasters retain some foreign-language programmes in their schedules.

- News in French in the Ö1 morning journal.
- News in French on FM4, also in the morning.
- News in English or bilingual shows on FM4

== See also ==
- List of radio stations in Austria
