= Ö1 Campus =

Austrian internet radio station

Ownership
- Owner: ORF

History
- First air date: January 1, 2009

Links
- Website: oe1.orf.at/campus

Ö1 Campus (formerly oe1campus) is a webradio broadcast by the ORF. It is targeted mainly towards students and migrants. Ö1 Campus produces its own specialized program, but some contents, in particular the news, are taken from Ö1.

== See also ==
- List of radio stations in Austria
