= Inge Maux =

Austrian actress (born 1944)

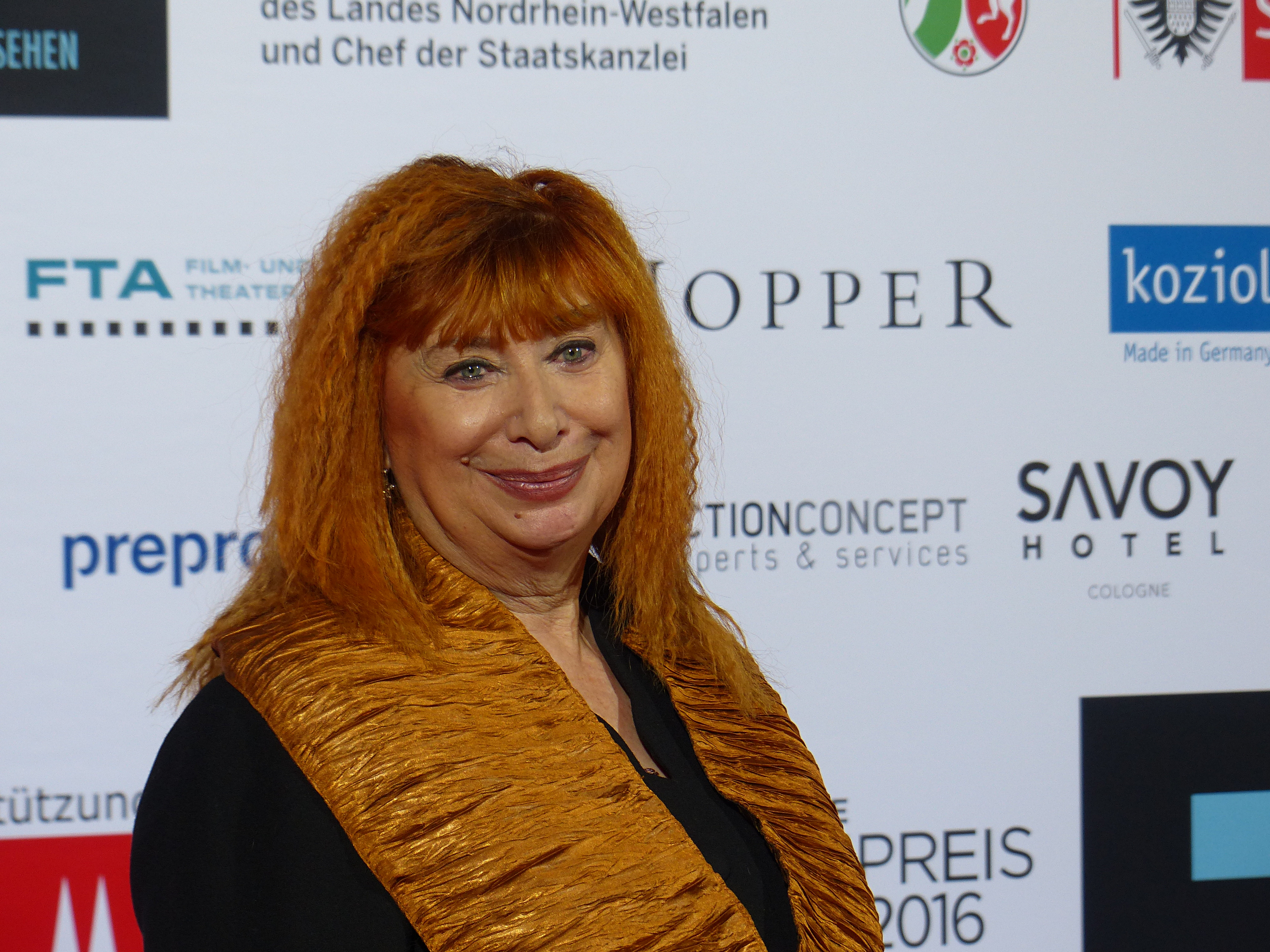
- Maux in 2015
- Born: 2 October 1944; Mettmach, Upper Austria
- Occupation: Actress

Inge Maux (born 2 October 1944 in Mettmach, Upper Austria as Ingeborg Christine Wöchtl) is an Austrian actress.

== Life ==
Maux grew up mainly in Upper Austria. Her uncle was the composer Richard Maux (1893-1971), who supported her artistically and convinced her parents that she should be allowed to attend the Vienna Drama School Krauss. She also took his surname as her stage name.

Acting engagements have taken her to the Schauspiel Köln and the Schauspielhaus Zürich and she has also appeared in various musicals, such as Yente in Anatevka at the Zürich Opera House, Theater an der Wien in Chicago and as Maria Wartberg in Ich war noch niemals in New York at the Raimund Theater. Guest performances brought her to the Residenz Theater Munich, to the Ernst Deutsch Theater in Hamburg, to the Theater in der Josefstadt and to the Theater in der Drachengasse.

Maux was a member of the Vienna Volkstheater, where she played the role of Betty Dullfeet in The Resistible Rise of Arturo Ui in the seasons 2010/11 to 2013/14, in Harvey the role of Veta Louise Simmons, in Mr Puntila and his Man Matti Laina and in Felix Mitterers play Du bleibst bei mir the role of Miss Krottensteiner.

In the summer of 2015 she played the White Queen in Alice in Wonderland at the summer games in Melk, in 2016 she appeared in front of the camera for the ORF Landkrimi Höhenstraße and for an episode of the fifth season of Schnell ermittelt.

In the TV series Braunschlag she played the role of Herta Tschach's mother, in Paradise: Love by Ulrich Seidl she played Teresa's girlfriend, in Jack by Elisabeth Scharang she was seen as Jack's mother. In Der Blunzenkönig she played a leading role alongside Karl Merkatz as Rösli, in the ZDFneo series Blockbustaz she played the role of Hella.

In her second marriage, Inge Maux is married to the actor Manfred Schmid (born 4 April 1940), with whom she lives in Artstetten in Lower Austria and organises special evenings with Jewish music. Besides her work as an actress, she also works as a photographer and painter.

== Achievements ==
- Deutsche Akademie für Fernsehen: Nomination in the category Actress-supporting role for Spuren des Bösen – Schande.
- Österreichischer Filmpreis 2016: Nomination in the category Best female supporting role for Jack.

== Filmography ==
- 1978: Grüne Witwen sind sie alle!
- 1982: Der grüne Stern
- 1986: Rosa und Rosalind
- 1988: Marienthal: The Sociography of an Unemployed Community
- 1990: Die Philosophie der Ameise
- 1991: Sehnsüchte oder Es ist alles unheimlich leicht
- 1996: Kaisermühlen Blues
- 1997: Die Schuld der Liebe
- 1998: Schlosshotel Orth
- 1998: Die 3 Posträuber
- 2005: Moral
- 2006–2011: Tom Turbo (tv show, four episodes)
- since 2008: Saugut
- 2010: Seine Mutter und ich
- 2010: Willkommen in Wien
- 2010: Tiger Team: The Mountain of the 1000 Dragons
- 2011: Anfang 80
- 2011: fauner consulting
- 2012: Braunschlag
- 2012: Paradise: Love
- 2013: Zweisitzrakete
- 2013: Paul Kemp – Alles kein Problem – Die Falle
- 2014: Boys Like Us
- 2014: Spuren des Bösen – Schande
- 2015: Vecchi Pazzi
- 2015: Jack
- 2015: Der Blunzenkönig
- 2015: Der Metzger und der Tote im Haifischbecken
- 2016: Blockbustaz
- 2016: Landkrimi – Höhenstraße
- 2017: Schnell ermittelt – Gudrun Schatzinger
- 2017: Sommerhäuser
- 2017: Dahoam is Dahoam
- 2017: SOKO Donau – Ich sehe was, was du nicht siehst
- 2018: Murer – Anatomie eines Prozesses
- 2018: The Awakening of Motti Wolkenbruch as Mame
