= Bastelstunde =

Die Bastelstunde (meaning Bricolage Hour or Hobby Hour) was a radio hobby show that aired on Austrian radio from 1929 to 1952. Bastelstunde appears to have been, globally, the first such radio show in which the moderator was building and explaining certain technical and craft projects. The show aired first on RAVAG Vienna on 8 October 1929, before being taken over by ORF Radio and was geared towards "children and other bastlers". During the time of Anschluss, when Austria was annexed to Germany from 1938 to 1945, Bastelstunde was taken over by Nazi German radio and its content was adapted to the craft bricolage needs of soldiers. After World War II the show was continued as before the war.

== Radio host Oskar Grissemann ==
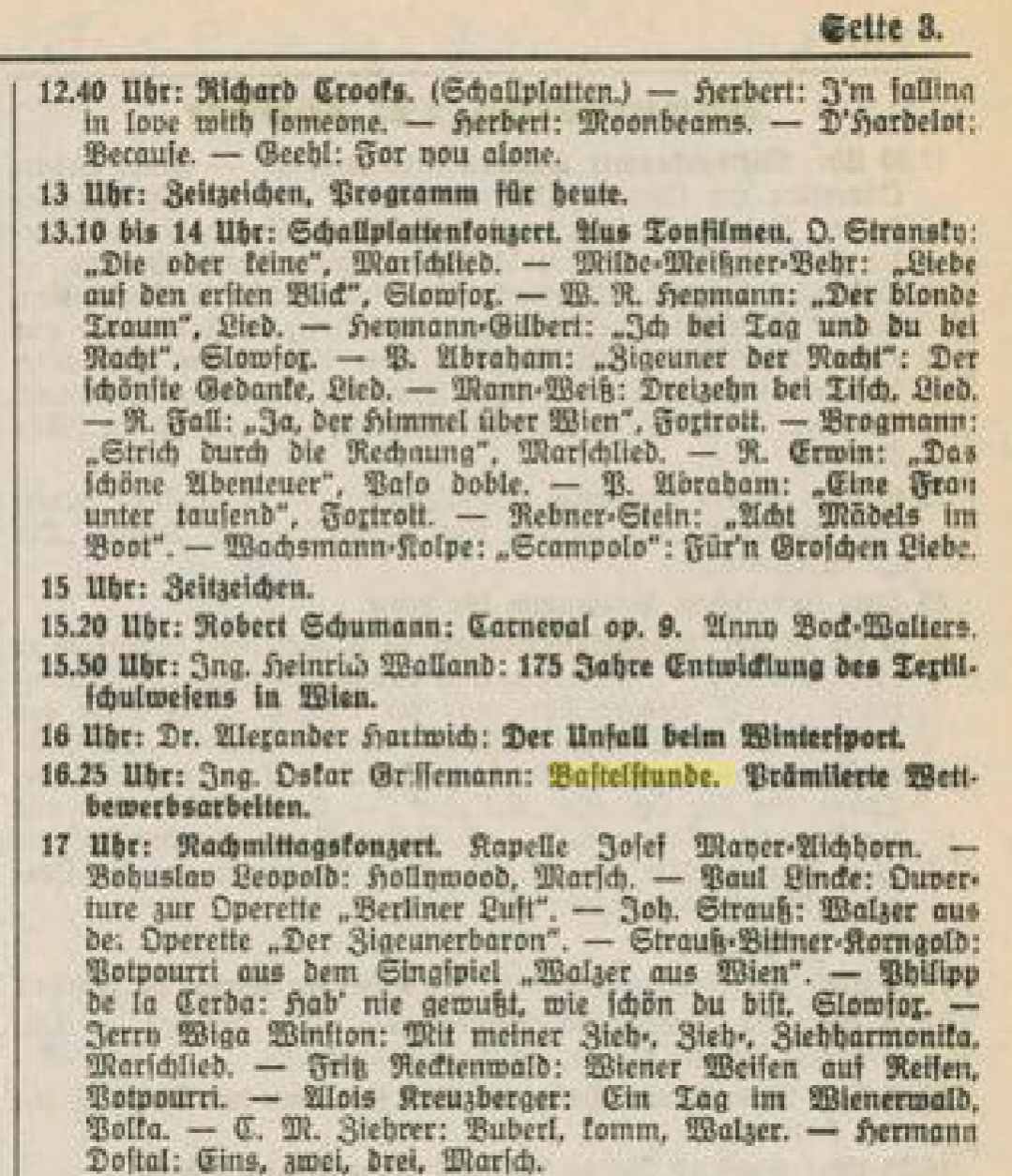
Bastelstunde (yellow highlight), program announcement for 10 January 1933 (Tiroler Radiowoche, 7 Jan. 1933,), p. 3

The broadcast was devised and presented by Ing. Oskar Grissemann, who hosted the show from 1929 to his death in 1952 through four governmental systems, two parliamentary democracies and two dictatorships, one of them Nazi Germany. Oskar Grissemann was the uncle of Austrian radio legend and stage actor Ernst Grissemann and the Great Uncle of comedian and radio and TV host Christoph Grissemann. Grissemann was known endearingly as the "Bastelonkel" — the uncle who teaches arts, crafts and engineering projects.

== Implementation modes ==
In the late 1920s, when radio was a very new medium, Grissemann and RAVAG experimented with innovative delivery formats, combining printed broadcast schedules with material lists. While do-it-yourself radio building kits were offered at about the same time (Radio-Electronics magazine) in the United States, Bastelstunde was a craft-building via radio show that was originally intended for children and the young-at-heart. Notably, it includes engineering projects such as miniature sailing boats, electric lights and radio receivers later on. By 1933, Bastelstunde would be announced beyond the reach of the Vienna station, for instance in Innsbruck radio broadcast schedules, and later in the 1930s would be co-broadcast with written print instructions that would complement the oral, live delivered, building instructions, which was soon met with some fandom and excitement.

In late March 1938, shortly after Anschluss, Radio Wien magazine attested to the popularity of the show. It featured an article on Grisseman and his show, acknowledging that in such "serious" times arts and crafts might not be the most pressing issue, but reported on an "important man of business" who was known to follow the bricolage shows regularly as the "relaxation" — listening and building — of the best kind.

== Media cultural relevance ==
Critics of radio, the new technology, were manifold in the 1920s and early 1930s. They reached from expressing general cultural warnings of raising a generation of people who would prefer to passively listen than act, to those worried about the abuse of the method by the new political parties and agents. In the former context, Bastelstunde, its longevity and consistent fan base through all forms of government in Austria, proved that radio can inspire listeners to get more active than they'd be otherwise.

For the 1920s, only five years after the introduction of radio broadcasting in Austria, this show was a domestically grown innovation, based on Grissmann's lived experience. A participatory element was introduced in the first year in form of a contest that assessed the quality of the products, creating a radio community with two-way communication.

Such shows were consequently moved to TV and with the programme reform in the early 1970s became a central part of Austrian children's TV (Am Dam Des, 1000 Tricks) and elementary public school pedagogy alike.
