= Saugut =

- The purple wild boar Franz Ferdinand, the main character of Saugut.
- Created by: Thomas Brezina
- Country of origin: Austria

Production
- Running time: 5 minutes

Original release
- Network: ORF1
- Release: 6 September 2008

Saugut is an Austrian children's television series which was produced by Austrian broadcaster ORF and created by the children's author Thomas Brezina, featuring a purple wild boar mascot, Franz. It first aired on ORF 1 at 6am on Saturday 6 September 2008 as part of the Okidoki children's programming block. It was broadcast on ORF 1 from 6 September 2008 until 8 January 2011 when it moved to the ORF Eins channel, where it was broadcast until 2018.

In 2010 it received a nomination for a Goldener Spatz (Golden Sparrow) Award, from a German children's festival.

== Plot ==
The show centres on Franz Ferdinand, a purple wild boar mascot (portrayed by a hand puppet) who has an "unusual perspective on the human world" and an "endearing naivety". Originally an ordinary wild boar living in the forest, Franz Ferdinand is pursued by unscrupulous researchers. A bolt of purple lightning transforms him into a talking, purple wild boar. Following this transformation, he takes up residence with a young teacher named Vivi, where he plays pranks on her, her boyfriend, and her neighbors.

== Cast ==
Team

- Vivi: Sigrid Spörk
- Ronni: Nikolaus Firmkranz
- Oma Olga: Inge Maux
- Frau Krautapfel: Biggi Fischer
- Herr Krautapfel: Eberhard Wagner

Guests

- Manuel Ortega, Missy May, Arabella Kiesbauer, Klaus Eberhartinger and many more.

== Development ==
The show was described by ORF director Wolfgang Lorenz as a "labor of love". He was quoted as saying "For us, children's programming is far more than just fulfilling an obligation; it is a fundamental part of our mission to show that we are here for the youngest audience members, too". By September 2008, ORF was airing 32 hours of children's television a week. Children's Thomas Brezina was hired to create the series, featuring the purple wild boar mascot Franz.

== Other programs ==
In April 2010, a spinoff show, the Sau-Schlau-Show was launched, a quiz show in which Franz Ferdinand hosts guests and asks them questions. Franz Ferdinand also appeared in other short segments where he took on roles such as a secret agent, a superhero, or a singer. These short clips were aired during the Sau-Schlau-Show, similar to commercial breaks. Guests on the Sau-Schlau-Show included Gerda Rogers, Manuel Ortega, Jazz Gitti and Eva K. Anderson.

== See also ==
- List of Austrian television series
