= Am Dam Des =

Austrian children's television series

- Starring: Thomas Brezina, Elisabeth Vitouch, Bernadette Schneider, Ingrid Riegler, Edith Rolles, Kurt Shalaby
- Country of origin: Austria
- No. of seasons: 19
- No. of episodes: 3986

Original release
- Network: ORF
- Release: April 1, 1975 – 1993

Am Dam Des was a children's television series produced at the ORF studios in Vienna, Austria between 1975 and 1993. It was screened weekdays on ORF 1.

This live-action show was presented as 25-minute episodes, with an educational theme and different sections, hosted by Thomas Brezina, Elisabeth Vitouch, Bernadette Schneider, Ingrid Riegler, Edith Rolles and Kurt Shalaby. They entertained children with poetry, stories, arts and crafts and various games. The show had many recurring guests including Habakuk the Clown played by Arminio Rothstein, Mimi the Goose, the magician Bobby Lugano and Enrico the Clown played by Heinz Zuber. Its arts and crafts sections can be seen as a development and adaptation of the TV screen of early Vienna radio arts and crafts shows (e g. Bastelstunde)

In 1977, Christoph Waltz joined the show as a singer welcoming the New Year.

== See also ==
- List of Austrian television series
