= Thomas Brezina =

Austrian writer

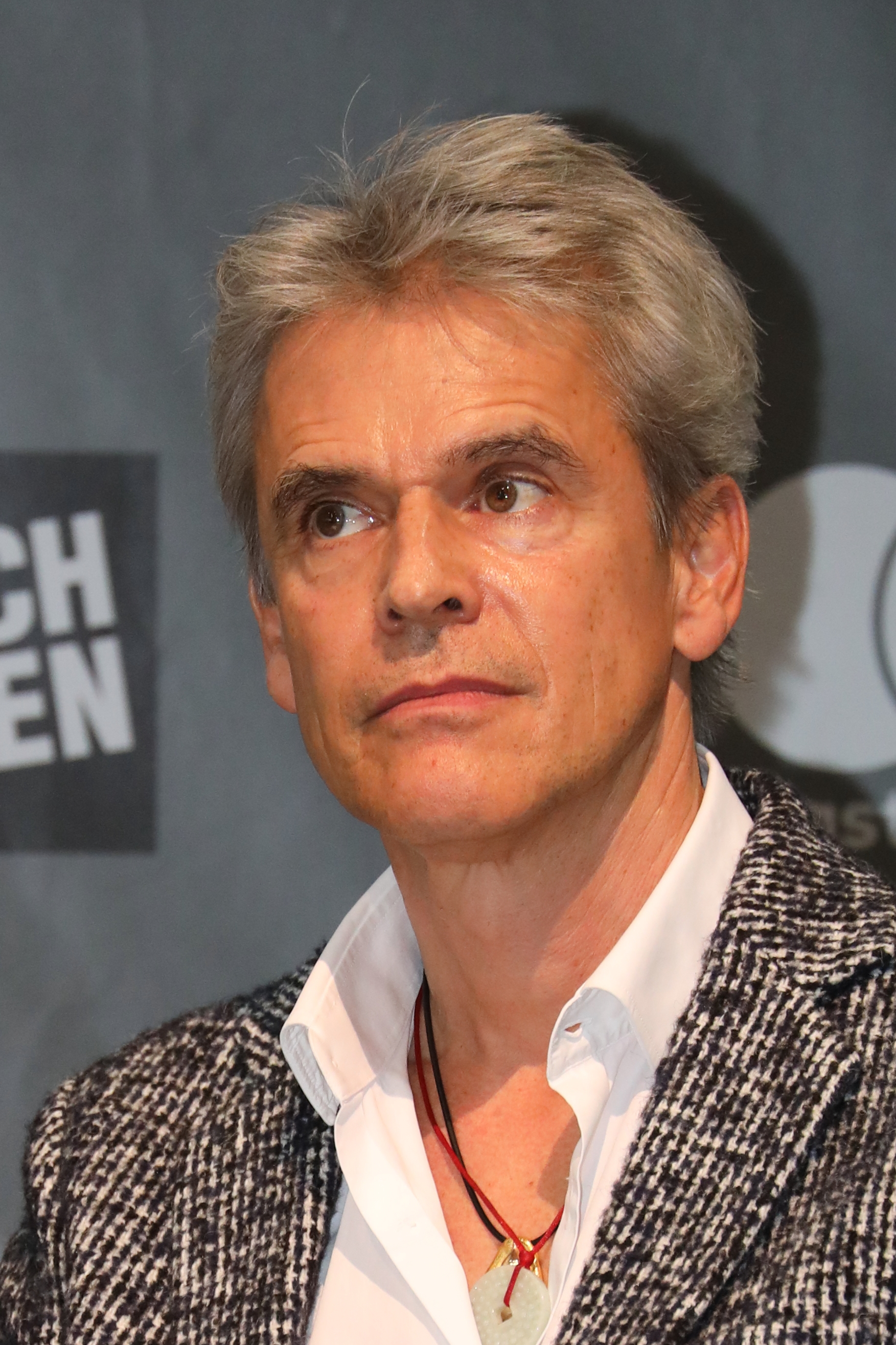
Thomas Brezina (2018)

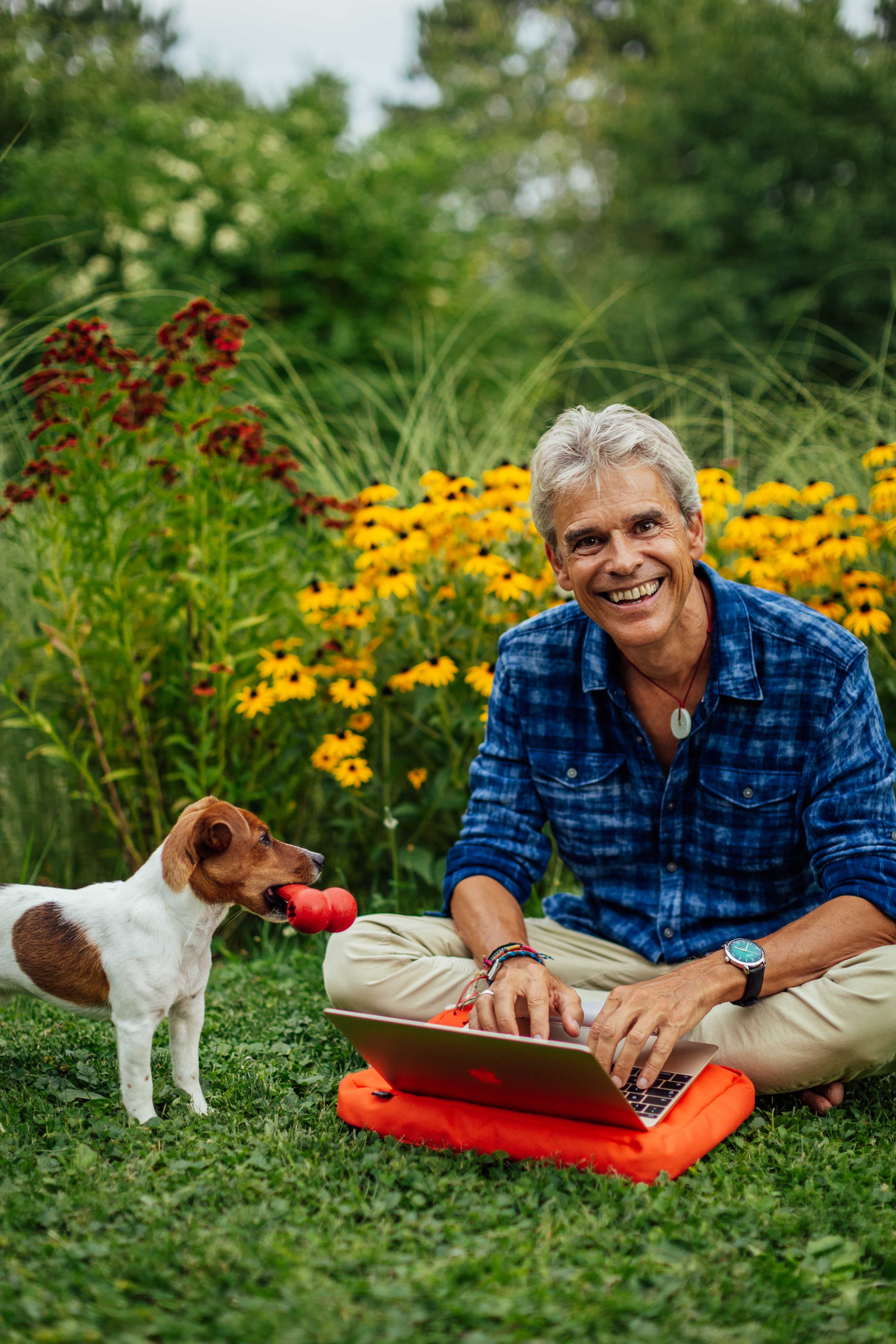
Thomas Brezina with his dog Joppy (2018)

Thomas C. Brezina is an Austrian writer of children's books and TV-Presenter. He is especially known for his series, The Knickerbocker Gang, A Case for You and the Tiger-Team and his stories about the talking bike Tom Turbo, as well as for hosting the children's television series Am Dam Des. He has published over 550 books and his work has been translated into 35 languages.

== Life ==
Brezina was born in Vienna. During his school days Brezina began writing and received the “Grand Austrian Youth Prize” for his screenplays for the TV-puppet-show “Tim, Tom and Dominik”. Subsequently, he worked as a puppeteer alongside Arminio Rothstein, better known as Clown Habakkuk in Austria, and played the magician Tintifax among others.

Brezina wrote bedtime stories and radio plays and finally began working as an assistant director for shows such as Am Dam Des, a children's program by Austrian national public service broadcaster Österreichischer Rundfunk (ORF). Subsequently, Brezina became a staffer at ORF as editor, director and eventually presenter for children's and youth programs.

His breakthrough as a writer occurred in 1990 with the series The Knickerbocker Gang. Three years later the book series Tom Turbo followed – a detective-series about the “world’s smartest bicycle” – which was later adapted for TV as an interactive children's program. Since 2008 Brezina is responsible for the children's program okidoki, broadcast on ORF eins.

Brezina has received numerous awards for his work, including the “Decoration of Honour for Services to the Republic of Austria” and the most important Austrian TV award Romy for the educational program Forscherexpress (“Researcher’s Express”).

Brezina lives in Vienna and London. Privately he engages in charities for disadvantaged children and became a UNICEF Goodwill Ambassador for Austria in 1996. For his 50th birthday he took a children's sponsorship for Light for the World and he is currently engaged as a testimonial for Austrian NGO Volkshilfe.

He came out as gay and has been married to Ivo Belajic, a Croatian painter, since 2017.

== Work ==
=== Books ===
Overall Brezina wrote more than 550 books, some of which have been translated into more than 35 languages. With about 40 million sold copies, he is one of the most successful German-language children's and youth book authors. Through his work on a variety of screenplays, Brezina got an offer to write books from German-based Breitschopf-Verlag. His first series was The Knickerbocker Gang in 1990 – detective stories about a gang of four kids solving mysteries with brains. The series was also made into a musical, a play, a movie and a television series in 1995 and 1996.

Three years later Brezina created Tom Turbo, the "coolest bike in the world", whose book series and interactive television format is running for 20 years since then. The Tom Turbo stories concern a talking bicycle capable of 111 amazing stunts. Together with his two friends, Caro and Claro, and his boss, Thomas Brezina, the bicycle solves mysteries. His main enemy is the purple-clad wannabe supervillain Fritz Fantom.

Other book series followed, such as No Boys! – Witches Only, Pssst! Our Secret! or Seven Paws for Penny. The heroine of the Penny books lives on a farm and, in the series' first title (What is a dog's life, after all?), saves a dog from being killed. The "seven paws" of the title refers to Penny's dogs; one has four white paws and one has three white paws and a black one. His adventure-series A Case for You and the Tiger-Team was a big international success, particularly in China, where the series overtook Harry Potter in terms of sales numbers at certain points.

The books by Brezina also spawned movies and television-series (for example The Knickerbocker Gang: The talking tomb and Tom Turbo – From 0 to 111), theatre-plays, musicals (for example Ritter Rups und der Pirat Kartoffelsalat (Knight Rups and captain Potato Salad)), radio plays and interactive videogames. Furthermore, he was involved in the conception of textbooks for schools, wrote and presented a number of educational videos about famous composers and wrote an interactive series of art books for children (Museum of Adventures). The series A MINI-Case for You and the Tiger-Team (an adaptation of the Tiger-Team adventures for younger readers) and Liz Kiss (a story about a girl becoming a ninja-superheroine) are his latest new works in the field of children's books.

=== TV ===
As an author, producer or presenter, Brezina was involved in over 40 TV series and shows for children. His shows, programs and series are mainly featured on Austrian national television broadcaster ORF, but also internationally on TV Educasi, Al Jaazera Children, Arte, DaVinci Learning, Nick, Sat.1 and SuperRTL. For years Brezina wrote the screenplays for the Austrian TV series Helmi, an educational program for kids, which explains dangers and precautions of traffic. He also invented the character of the dog Sokrates, the somewhat clumsy companion of Helmi. Starting as a presenter, Brezina hosted a variety of interactive TV shows and series for the children's program of ORF, including Am Dam Des, Die Rätselburg (Quiz Castle), Drachenschatz (Dragon's Treasure) and Forscherexpress (Researcher's Express).

In Austria, one of his most famous TV shows is the detective series Tom Turbo / Tom Turbo Detective Club. The interactive show features Tom, a talking bicycle with 111 tricks and young detectives catching clumsy crooks and solving mysteries together with the audience in front of the TV. The series was shot at memorable locations throughout Austria and is still running since the first episode aired in 1993.

In 2008, Brezina and his company Tower10 relaunched the children's program of ORF, rebranded it under the name of okidoki and are responsible for the program since then. As a part of that, Brezina presented and still presents a couple of formats, most notable 7 Wunder (7 Wonders), Trickfabrik (Trick Factory) and Genau so geht’s (That's How It Goes). Brezina created the series Saugut, featuring a talking purple wild boar mascot, which first aired on ORF 1 in September 2008.

=== Other projects ===
Besides writing, TV and movies, Brezina stages a variety of events for children, for example the Wien-Detektiv (Vienna-Detective), an educational book-project by the city of Vienna. During the project, kids received free books and were invited to participate in a citywide detective-game.

Together with Gerhard Krammer, Thomas Brezina wrote four musicals for the family-festival Forchtenstein Fantastisch at Castle Forchtenstein in Burgenland, Austria. In them, a small knight named Rups goes on a variety of adventures. The musicals were performed for seven years until now.

The tourist destination Serfaus-Fiss-Ladis offers an adventure trail for children designed by Brezina. This trail, called “Mountain of Adventures” includes three hiking routes on which children can solve puzzles with special detective-equipment.

Brezina has written audio guides for St. Stephen's Cathedral in Vienna, which describe the history of the cathedral in an adventurous manner suitable for children.

In 2017 Brezina designed the Visitors Area for Vienna International Airport, a multimedia experience for kids as well as adults.

For the Tiergarten Schönbrunn Brezina designed the App "Zoo Adventures by Thomas Brezina". The app leads the user on various tours like "Thomas Brezina's favorite animals" through the zoo and is available for iOS and Android smartphones.
