= The Knickerbocker Gang =

Children's book series by Thomas Brezina

- Author: Thomas Brezina
- Original title: Knickerbocker-Bande
- Country: Austria
- Language: German

The Knickerbocker Gang (German: Die Knickerbocker-Bande) is a series of books for children by Austrian writer Thomas Brezina. It features stories about junior detectives called Axel, Poppi, Lilo and Dominik, who solve mysteries. The books, originally in German, have been translated to approximately nineteen different languages. The 1997 Austrian TV series Die Knickerbocker-Bande was based on the books.

A junior series, along with a 2017 adult novel entitled Knickerbocker 4 immer – Alte Geister Ruhen Unsanft, have been published. For selling over 25,000 copies of Die Knickerbockerbande 4Immer – Alte Geister ruhen unsanft, Brezina received the Platinbuch award.

== Books ==
Seventy-one books, not including the English language publications or the special editions, have been published in German. A junior series intended for readers between the ages of 7–8 years, Knickerbocker-Bande Junior, has been published in Austria.

=== Series novels ===
- 1. Rätsel um das Schneemonster
- 2. Ein UFO namens Amadeus
- 3. Lindwurmspuk vor Mitternacht
- 4. Wenn die Turmuhr 13 schlägt
- 5. Bodenseepiraten auf der Spur
- 6. Das Phantom der Schule
- 7. Die Tonne mit dem Totenkopf
- 8. Wo ist der Millionenstorch?
- 9. Treffpunkt Schauermühle
- 10. Der Fluch des schwarzen Ritters
- 11. Die Nacht der Weißwurst-Vampire
- 12. Schokolade des Schreckens
- 13. Der Ruf des Grusel-Kuckucks
- 14. Jagd auf den Hafenhai
- 15. Das Zombie-Schwert des Sultans
- 16. SOS vom Geisterschiff
- 17. Die Rache der roten Mumie
- 18. Kolumbus und die Killerkarpfen
- 19. Die Gruft des Baron Pizza
- 20. Insel der Ungeheuer
- 21. Frankensteins Wolkenkratzer
- 22. Der tätowierte Elefant
- 23. Die Drachen-Dschunke
- 24. Der weiße Gorilla
- 25. Der grüne Glöckner
- 26. Im Dschungel verschollen
- 27. Im Tal der Donnerechsen
- 28. Titanic, bitte melden!
- 29. Der eiskalte Troll
- 30. Im Reich des Geisterzaren
- 31. Der Bumerang des Bösen
- 32. Kennwort Giftkralle
- 33. Das Riff der Teufelsrochen
- 34. Das Geheimnis der gelben Kapuzen
- 35. Der Geisterreiter
- 36. Im Wald der Werwölfe
- 37. Die giftgelbe Geige
- 38. Das Haus der Höllensalamander
- 39. Das Biest im Moor
- 40. Die Maske mit den glühenden Augen
- 41. Die Hand aus der Tiefe
- 42. 13 blaue Katzen
- 43. Die rote Mumie kehrt zurück
- 44. Die Höhle der Säbelzahntiger
- 45. Der Mann ohne Gesicht
- 46. Hinter der verbotenen Tür
- 47. Das Phantom der Schule spukt weiter
- 48. Der unsichtbare Spieler
- 49. Es kam aus dem Eis
- 50. Der Schrei der goldenen Schlange
- 51. Der Schatz der letzten Drachen
- 52. Das Wesen aus der Teufelsschlucht
- 53. Das Diamantengesicht
- 54. Das Gold des Grafen Drakul
- 55. Der Taucher mit den Schlangenaugen
- 56. Das Geheimnis des Herrn Halloween
- 57. Das Internat der Geister
- 58. Der Computer-Dämon
- 59. Der Turm des Hexers
- 60. Das Amulett des Superstars
- 61. Wenn der Geisterhund heult
- 62. Das Mädchen aus der Pyramide
- 63. Spuk im Stadion (Der Fall mit dem 5. Mitglied der Knickerbockerbande)
- 64. Im Bann des Geisterpiraten
- 65. Die Monstermaske der Lagune
- 66. Der Meister der Dunkelheit
- 67. Der Spinnenmagier
- 68. (Serie #2 2.) U-Bahn ins Geisterreich
- 69. (Serie #2 3.) Der Panther im Nebelwald
- 70. (Knickerbocker4immer) Alte Geister ruhen unsanft
- 71. (Knickerbocker4immer) Schatten der Zukunft

=== Special editions ===
- Jagd auf den 100 Milliarden Dollar Schatz (Zum 10jährigen Serienjubiläum)
- Wenn der Eismensch erwacht (Knickerbocker 2000)
- Das Kabinett des Dr. Horribilus (Neuauflage der bereits als Band 56 erschienene Geschichte "Das Geheimnis des Herrn Halloween" im Jahr 2007. Der Titel wurde geändert, um aktueller und dramatischer zu klingen.)
- Das sprechende Grab (Buch zum Film)
- Du entscheidest selbst, 1: Die Jagd nach Dr. Quallenstein
- Du entscheidest selbst, 2: Das Vermächtnis der Frida Frankenfein
- Du entscheidest selbst, 3: Das Geheimnis der Blauen Insel
- Du entscheidest selbst, 4: Sieben Schlüssel zum Schlangenschloss
- Gift für den Killerwal (14 Ratekrimis)
- Wenn der Wolfsmann heult (12 Ratekrimis)
- Die Gänsehaut-Orgel (15 Ratekrimis)
- Pferdehof in Gefahr (12 Ratekrimis)
- Die Geisterkatze zeigt die Krallen (16 Ratekrimis)
- Unternehmen Wüstenwurm (12 Ratekrimis)
- Es tanzen die Vampire (15 Ratekrimis)
- Raub beim Ritterfest (13 Ratekrimis)
- Schloss Schauerlich (13 Ratekrimis)
- Der Schatz am Meeresgrund (15 Ratekrimis)
- Wilddieben auf der Spur (16 Ratekrimis)
- Geheimakte Y (5 Kurzgeschichten)
- 99 heiße Spuren
- Neue heiße Spuren
- Superheiße Spuren
- Heiße Spuren für Meisterdetektive
- Auf frischer Tat ertappt (Ratekrimis, erschien am 1. Mai 2009)
- Das Geheimbuch für Detektive
- Die Knickerbockerbande von A bis Z

=== English editions ===
- Who is Robin Horror?
- The Horror Diamond
- Horror in Hollywood
- Alice in Horrorland
- Welcome to Horror Hotel
