= Ö1 International =

International broadcasting station of Austria

Radio Austria 1 International Ö1 International
- Type: Radio network
- Country: Austria

Ownership
- Owner: ORF

History
- Launch date: July 1, 2003
- Replaced: Radio Österreich International
- Closed: December 31, 2024

Coverage
- Availability: International

Links
- Website: oe1.orf.at/service/international

Radio Austria 1 International (Ö1 International) was the official international broadcasting station of Austria.

Austrian Radio 1 (Ö1) is its most successful cultural radio network. It replaced Radio Österreich International which was discontinued for financial reasons at the end of 2003.

The station's transmitters were in Moosbrunn, on the outskirts of Vienna.

== Programming ==
The entire programme offering, with just a few changes, is broadcast worldwide as Ö1 International. This mix of information, culture, music, literature, education, science and religion reaches Austrians living abroad as well as a global audience with an interest in Austria.

=== Report from Austria ===
Report from Austria, a 15-minute news and current affairs programme on the air Monday to Friday, keeps the listener up to date on what is happening in Austria with news bulletins, as well as interviews and features from the world of domestic and international politics, business, culture and sports.

== Time and frequency ==
- Monday to Friday: 6:00 p.m. to 6:25 p.m. CET (17:00 to 17:25 UTC), 5.940 MHz
- Monday to Friday: 7 a.m. to 8:20 a.m. CET (06:00 to 07:20 UTC), 6.155 MHz
- Saturday and Sunday: 7 a.m. to 8:10 a.m. CET (06:00 to 07:10 UTC), 6.155 MHz
- Monday to Saturday: 12:00 p.m. to 1:00 p.m. CET (11:00 to 12:00 UTC), 13.730 MHz

== See also ==
- Ö1
- ORF, the Austrian publicly funded broadcaster
- List of international radio broadcasters
