= Ö1 Inforadio =

Austrian radio station

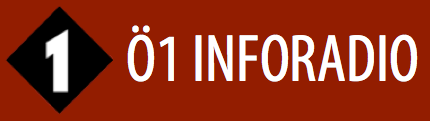
- Austria

Ownership
- Owner: ORF

Ö1 Inforadio was an Austrian online information radio station broadcast by ORF.

It broadcast news and information, culture and politics 24 hours a day. Unlike the main Ö1 station, it only comprised spoken word and did not broadcast music. The station was only receivable via an internet stream. Ö1 Inforadio did not broadcast advertisements.

== See also ==
- Ö1
- ORF the Austrian publicly funded radio broadcaster
