= Robert Palfrader =

Austrian actor (born 1968)

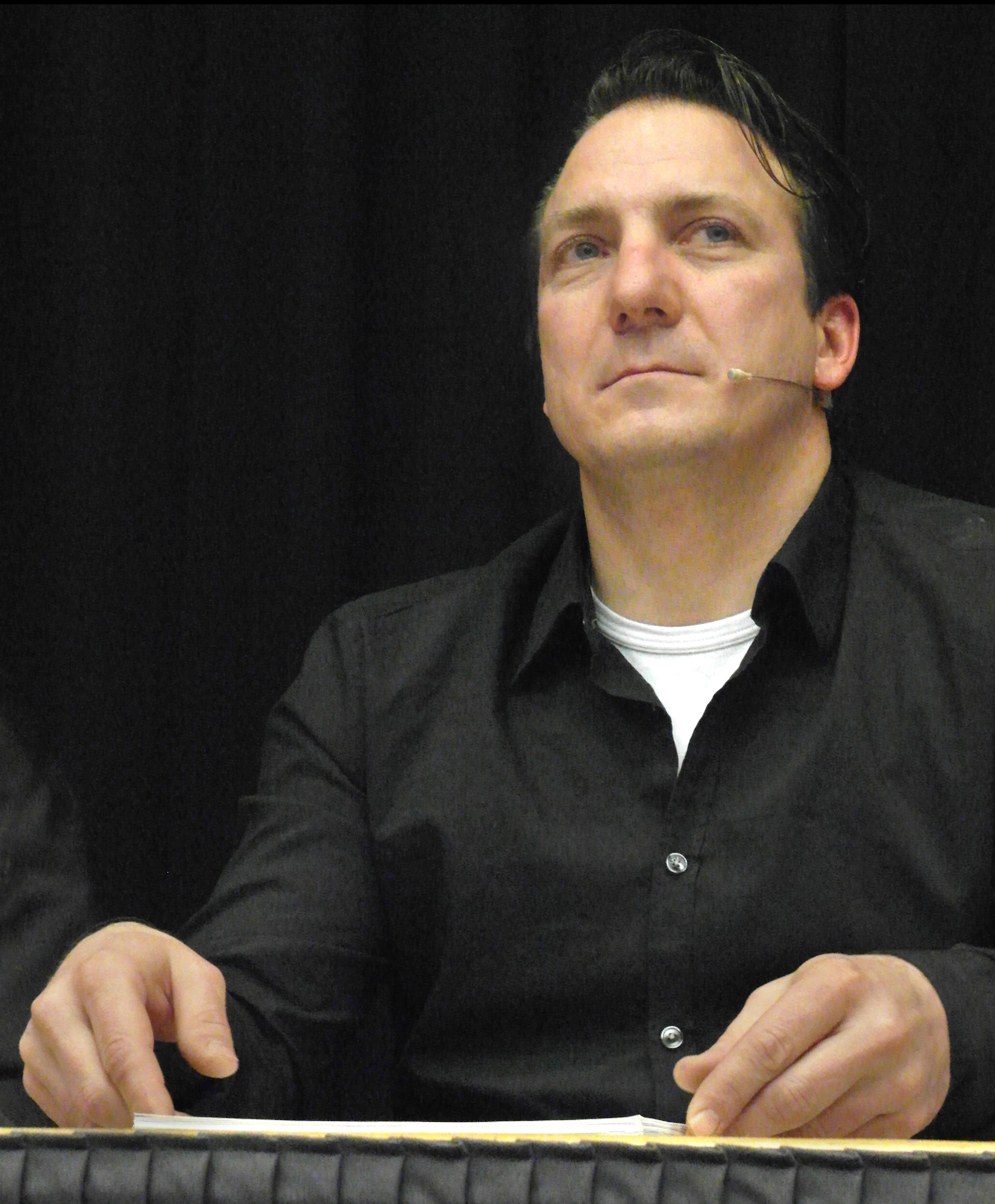
Palfrader in 2011

Robert Heinrich Palfrader (born 11 November 1968) is an Austrian actor, comedian and author.

== Biography ==
Palfrader was born in Vienna, of partly South Tyrolean origin (on his father's side, who hailed from St. Vigil). Originally, he was the owner of a café in Vienna's Josefstadt district. His career in entertainment started when he was discovered by an agency in Germany, where he was working for TV station SAT 1.

In Austria, he initially worked for local radio station Wien 1, before being employed by national broadcaster ORF. There he has mainly done comedy shows, the most popular being echt fett, a hidden camera prank show (based on British format Trigger Happy TV), and Wir sind Kaiser (We are Emperor), a political satire where the Austrian monarchy is restored. There, Palfrader plays the "Emperor Robert Heinrich" based on the Emperors of Austria.

On the theatre stage, he has been playing at Vienna's Rabenhof-Theater and at the city's Volkstheater, in plays by Ödön von Horvath and Ferenc Molnar.
