= Radio Niederösterreich =

Austria
- Broadcast area: Lower Austria
- Frequencies: FM: 91.5 MHz; 97.9 MHz

Ownership
- Owner: ORF

History
- First air date: October 1, 1967

Links
- Webcast: web stream
- Website: noe.orf.at/radio

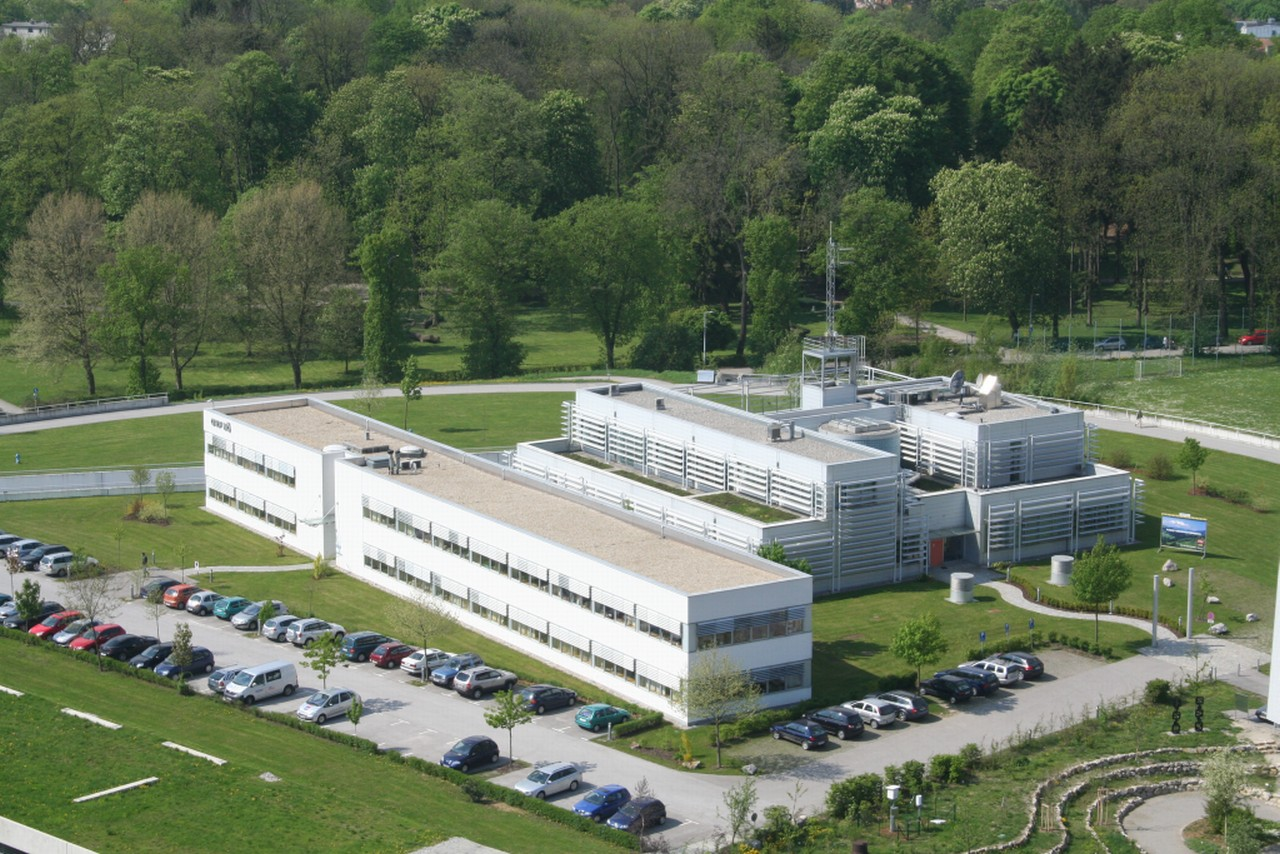
ORF Landesstudio NÖ

Radio Niederösterreich is the regional radio for Lower Austria, and is part of the Österreich 2 group. It is broadcast by the ORF, and the programs from Radio Niederösterreich are made in the ORF Niederösterreich Studio.

The radio is mostly heard by the 60+ age group and has a traditionally high listenership in Vienna. It mostly plays old hit-songs, as well as some international music. In the evening, Radio Niederösterreich produces a one-hour show focusing on folk music. The radio offers detailed coverages from live-events and information from all over Austria and positions itself as a "service radio".

In the last few years, many programs were merged with large broadcasting lines, whereby Radio Niederösterreich followed the trend to a format radio.

Since Radio Wien advanced to being a modern hit radio, Radio Niederösterreich was also able to position itself on the highly competitive Viennese radio market, next to Radio Arabella and Radio Burgenland. Looking at market shares, in Vienna Radio Wien is only 5% ahead of Radio Niederösterreich.

The ORF Niederösterreich Studio is located in Sankt Pölten, but has 4 little offices across the state, which are in Amstetten (Studio Mostviertel), Gmünd (Studio Waldviertel), Hollabrunn (Studio Weinviertel) and in Wiener Neustadt (Studio Industrieviertel). With this, all 4 state districts are covered and faster news coverages are possible.

In the ORF Niederösterreich Studio, the daily "Niederösterreich heute" news are also produced for TV, as well as other coverages for the TV channel ORF 2.

== Frequency ==
Radio Niederösterreich is available in Lower Austria and Vienna, on the frequencies 91,5 MHz (Sankt Pölten 1-Jauerling 100 kW ERP) and 97,9 MHz (Wien 1-Kahlenberg 100 kW ERP). It is also possible to receive Radio Niederösterreich over internet stream or satellite.
