= The Awakening of Motti Wolkenbruch =

2018 film directed by Michael Steiner

- Promotional release poster
- Directed by: Michael Steiner
- Written by: Thomas Meyer
- Produced by: Michael Steiger; Hans G. Syz; Anita Wasser
- Starring: Joel Basman; Noémie Schmidt; Inge Maux; Udo Samel
- Cinematography: Michael Saxer
- Edited by: Benjamin Fueter
- Music by: Adrian Frutiger
- Distributed by: DCM Film Distribution
- Release date: 29 September 2018
- Running time: 94 minutes
- Country: Switzerland
- Languages: German; Yiddish; Hebrew; Swiss German

The Awakening of Motti Wolkenbruch (German: Wolkenbruchs wunderliche Reise in die Arme einer Schickse, lit. 'Wolkenbruch's Wondrous Journey Into the Arms of a Shiksa') is a 2018 Swiss comedy-drama film directed by Michael Steiner. It was selected as the Swiss entry for the Best International Feature Film at the 92nd Academy Awards, but it was not nominated. It is based on Swiss author Thomas Meyer's debut novel, also called Wolkenbruch's Wondrous Journey into the Arms of a Shiksa.

== Plot ==
A Jewish Orthodox student faces familial opposition after falling madly in love with a shiksa. Motti is a good Jewish boy dominated by his mother. He is in college studying economics for his family. Motti's mother constantly arranges dates for Motti, hoping he will marry soon. In class, he meets Laura. Unlike Motti's other dates, he is interested in Laura. But she is not Jewish and therefore a 'shiksa' in Yiddish. He knows his mother would never approve.

Motti starts to hang out with Laura. She wears blue jeans, drinks gin and tonics and, according to Motti, has a great ass. At the same time, Motti is still being set up on dates by his mother. On one of his dates, Motti and the girl, Michal, agree to act as if they are dating to stop their mothers from bombarding them with date proposals. Motti's mom wrecks her car with excitement over the news. Meanwhile, Motti and Laura keep dating.

Eventually, Motti cannot stand the pressure from his mother. Motti confesses to his mother that he and Michal were never dating and the whole thing was a lie. His mother decides that he needs to meet with their Rabbi. The Rabbi thinks that Motti needs to go to Israel as perhaps there he will find a wife. In Tel Aviv, he meets a girl named Yael. They spend the entire day together at the beach. Yael brings Motti back to her place and Motti loses his virginity. The next morning Motti's mom calls. Motti tells his parents that he lost his virginity, to his mother's dismay. When Motti returns to Zurich, he goes on another date with Laura.

Laura has a party and invites Motti. After a night of drinks, dancing, and drugs, Motti spends the night with Laura. The next day Motti thinks it is time to introduce Laura to his parents. Motti's mom is polite but then says they need to go to synagogue. Once Laura leaves, his mother, enraged at her son's desire for a shiksa, disowns Motti and kicks him out of the house.

Motti decides he will go live with Laura. But she tells him that while she likes Motti, she is not ready for that much commitment.

Motti visits his dying insurance client, Frau Silberzweig. Her tarot cards had predicted an end to something and she wondered if it had happened. He explains "basically everything." In which Frau Silberzweig tells him that that is good news. She explains that if everything is over, Motti now has space to experience everything.

Motti leaves and receives a call from Laura. The scene ends with an overshot of Motti with the viewer left to wonder what happened in that call.

== Cast ==
- Joel Basman as Mordechai 'Motti' Wolkenbruch
- Noémie Schmidt as Laura
- Inge Maux as Mame Judith Wolkenbruch
- Udo Samel as Tate Moishe Wolkenbruch
- Sunnyi Melles as Frau Silberzweig
- Eli Gorenstein as Rabbi Jonathan
- Lena Kalisch as Mechal
- Meital Gal Swisa as Jael

== Reception ==
The Awakening of Motti Wolkenbruch has an approval rating of 63% on review aggregator website Rotten Tomatoes, based on 8 reviews, and an average rating of 5.3/10.

Hey Alma's Lior Zaltzman described the film as a "misogynistic dumpster fire".

== See also ==
- List of submissions to the 92nd Academy Awards for Best International Feature Film
- List of Swiss submissions for the Academy Award for Best International Feature Film
