= Wir sind Kaiser =

- Genre: Comedy; Talk show
- Created by: Robert Palfrader, Rudolf Roubinek
- Presented by: Robert Palfrader
- Starring: Rudolf Roubinek; Austropop artists and groups
- Country of origin: Austria
- Original language: German
- No. of seasons: 3

Production
- Production locations: Haus der Industrie; Vienna, Austria
- Running time: 40 minutes

Original release
- Network: ORF
- Release: 2007 – present

Related
- Seyffenstein-Chroniken

Wir sind Kaiser (We are Emperor) is a satirical late-night talk show of the Austrian Broadcasting Corporation (ORF), which aired between 2007 and 2010 as part of Thursday night. Through 3sat the show could also be seen in Germany and Switzerland. Measured by market share Wir sind Kaiser was the most successful self-produced weekly broadcast production on ORF 1 between 2007 and 2010. Since the end of 2010, new special episodes are broadcast on a quarterly basis.

== Concept ==
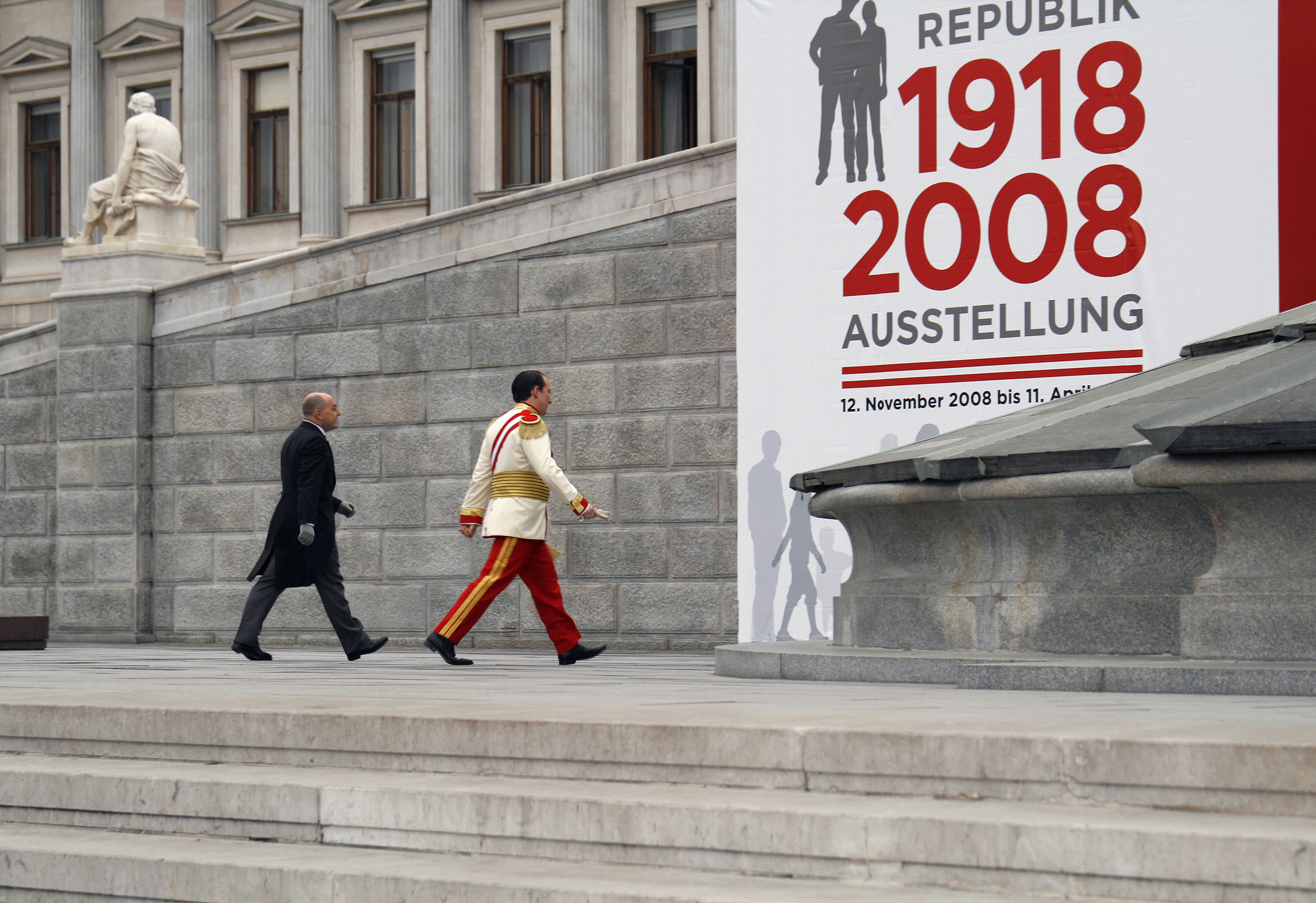
Emperor Robert Heinrich and his steward Seyffenstein on their way to the Austrian Parliament in 2008

The show is a political satire in which the Austrian people have become so disappointed with the politics of their country after decades that they decided to restore the Austrian monarchy. There, Robert Palfrader plays "Emperor Robert Heinrich" based on the Emperors of Austria. His duty is to bring imperial glory back to the depressed nation. Emperor Robert Heinrich always uses the majestic plural when speaking of himself and also addresses others in the third person singular ("he shall go there ...", "what is she doing there?"). He is supported by his grand steward Seyffenstein (Rudolf Roubinek, who is also the main author of the program together with Klaus Oppitz) and the servant Vormärz (FM4 presenter Rudi Schöllerbacher). In the later broadcasts also a second servant named Biedermeier (Florian Perger) appears. There is also the emperor's playmate (Karin Chvatal). Both servants and the playmate however do not speak normally. The broadcasts are recorded in front of a live audience in the Great Hall in the House of Industry at Schwarzenbergplatz in Vienna.

At the opening of the public 40 minutes long "audience" of the emperor, the "Emperor's Anthem" is sung to the tune of The Internationale but with a text that praised the emperor to lead the beautiful country out from bad times. Afterwards, Seyffenstein reads the post to the emperor. These are usually petitions to the emperor from national and international personalities. Subsequently, "His Majesty" receives guests which are mostly Austrian celebrities and politicians, sometimes also Germans. In his audience he solves political conflicts and shows records of his daily life as a beloved head of state. His actions are mostly faked and in reality they are carried out by his dutiful servant Vormärz. Robert Heinrich I often shows great concern for his country during the show. However his guests are often treated in a provocative manner and even disdain.

In addition, most Austropop artists performed in the program for musical entertainment, such as Zweitfrau and Excuse Me Moses.

A running gag was the weekly appearance of the entrepreneur Richard Lugner, who always appeared in a different disguise or pretended to be someone else and asked for an audience, but was always refused. Only in the episode of January 3, 2008 was he finally allowed to enter the audience chamber. Another running gag is the gifts of the guests to His Majesty, which are usually snow globes with penguins, which the emperor regularly passes Vormärz for the special tray. In the end the emperor always offers the departing words to his guests: "S/he may retire, but s/he must also be a bit obedient!"

== Reception ==
The show ran successfully with top ratings up to 28% market share and is thus considered one of the most successful programs since the 2007 program reform. The last episode of the first season of January 17, 2008 reached 462,000 viewers (24% market share). Record rates reached the edition of 4 December 2008 with 603,000 viewers (27% market share). The highest market share was achieved on September 24, 2009 at 30%.

The show was critically acclaimed. Palfrader received in 2008 the Romy TV award for his role as the emperor. The show received in 2017 the Viewers Choice Award of the Austrian Cabaret Price.
