= Erich Sokol =

- Born: 31 March 1933; Vienna
- Died: 20 February 2003 (aged 69); Vienna
- Occupation: Caricaturist
- Awards: City of Vienna Prize for Fine Arts (applied arts, 1977)

Erich Sokol (31 March 1933 – 20 February 2003) was an Austrian illustrator and caricaturist.

== Life and career ==
Erich Sokol was born in Vienna and attended the Goethe-Realschule (now Gymnasium Astgasse) in the city's 14th district. Besides his interest in handball, drawing was his passion from an early age. During his high school years he attended courses at the Akademie der bildenden Künste" in Vienna. In 1952, the young Sokol sold his first drawing to the socialist newspaper Das Kleine Blatt for a fee of 15 shillings at the time.

In 1952, he graduated from high school and began his studies at the Hochschule für Welthandel. Parallel to his business studies, drawing remained his true passion, and he also achieved further sales success with it. He produced illustrated jokes and political cartoons for, among others, Neuer Kurier, Die Presse, stern, Die Bühne, Wiener Bilderwoche, Schweizer Illustrierte Zeitung, Arbeiter-Zeitung, Weltpresse and Münchner Illustrierte. Drawings by him were also bought and published by the English magazine Punch.

Between 1957 and 1959, Erich Sokol resided in the United States. After receiving a Moholy-Nagy scholarship, he studied for two semesters at the Institute of Design of the Illinois Institute of Technology in Chicago (courses in visual design, photography, and typography). During this time, he earned his living primarily with graphic work for Playboy and The Lion Magazine. It was then that Hugh Hefner, founder and publisher of Playboy magazine, became aware of Sokol's talent and recruited him as a regular contributor, which he remained for decades. Sokol worked on a volume of satirical drawings depicting American characters. His "American Natives" was published by Harper & Brothers in New York, and later by Hamish Hamilton in London.

In November 1959, Sokol returned to his native Austria and in 1960 joined the editorial staff of the Social Democratic Arbeiter Zeitung (AZ) as a political cartoonist. From 1965, Sokol was a freelancer for the Süddeutsche Zeitung and resigned from the editorial staff of the Arbeiter-Zeitung in 1967. While working as a political caricaturist in Vienna, he first became known in wide circles in Austria: at that time, the AZ published his "best" caricatures collected in annual volumes.

In 1967, at Gerd Bacher's invitation, Sokol moved to the newly reformed state broadcaster ORF as chief graphic designer. He made his debut as director of a television program in 1973. On Saturday, July 12, 1975, Sokol's first cover for the Neue Kronen-Zeitung (until 1996) was published, and at the same time he discontinued his work for Playboy, for which he had been working for 18 years.

In 1987, Erich Sokol took over the formative post of art director for ORF and was thus responsible for the entire design area (graphics, equipment, costume). In 1992, Sokol was prematurely retired as Art Director of ORF in the course of an ORF relaunch.

From 1999 on, his cover pictures appeared for Die Presse, and at the end of the 1990s he founded the Erich Sokol Private Foundation in Mödling with his partner Annemarie Höld-Praschl.

Well-known creations of Sokol's were the "ÖVP-Tant'" in the Arbeiter-Zeitung, the ORF-Auge (ORF Eye) logo for the state broadcaster, and his caricatures of Bruno Kreisky, the Social Democrat who served as Federal Chancellor from 1970 to 1983. Sokol's front pages for the Kronen-Zeitung, the monthly business magazine "trend" and the news magazine "profil" were characterized by their complexity and subtle humor. Sokol also designed the record cover for Der Herr Karl by Carl Merz and Helmut Qualtinger as well as the logo of the catering company Do & Co. Sokol belonged to the "Gutruf clique" around Qualtinger, Sokol's friend Teddy Podgorski and others, active from the 1950s on.

He also had a long friendship with the actor Felix Dvorak. He created a portrait of Dvorak for his album "k.u.k.. Scharfrichter Lang", he designed the stage set and poster for "Olympia" at the Mödlinger Komödienspiele in 1995 and staged the TV show "Felix Felix" designed for Montreux.

== Personal life ==
Erich Sokol was married to Adriana Gaspar from 1961 to 1993, and they had three children. In 1995 Erich Sokol met Annemarie Höld-Praschl, and in 2001 he married his long-time partner. Since his death in 2003, his widow Annemarie Sokol has administered his artistic work, the Erich Sokol Private Foundation in Mödling.

=== Death ===
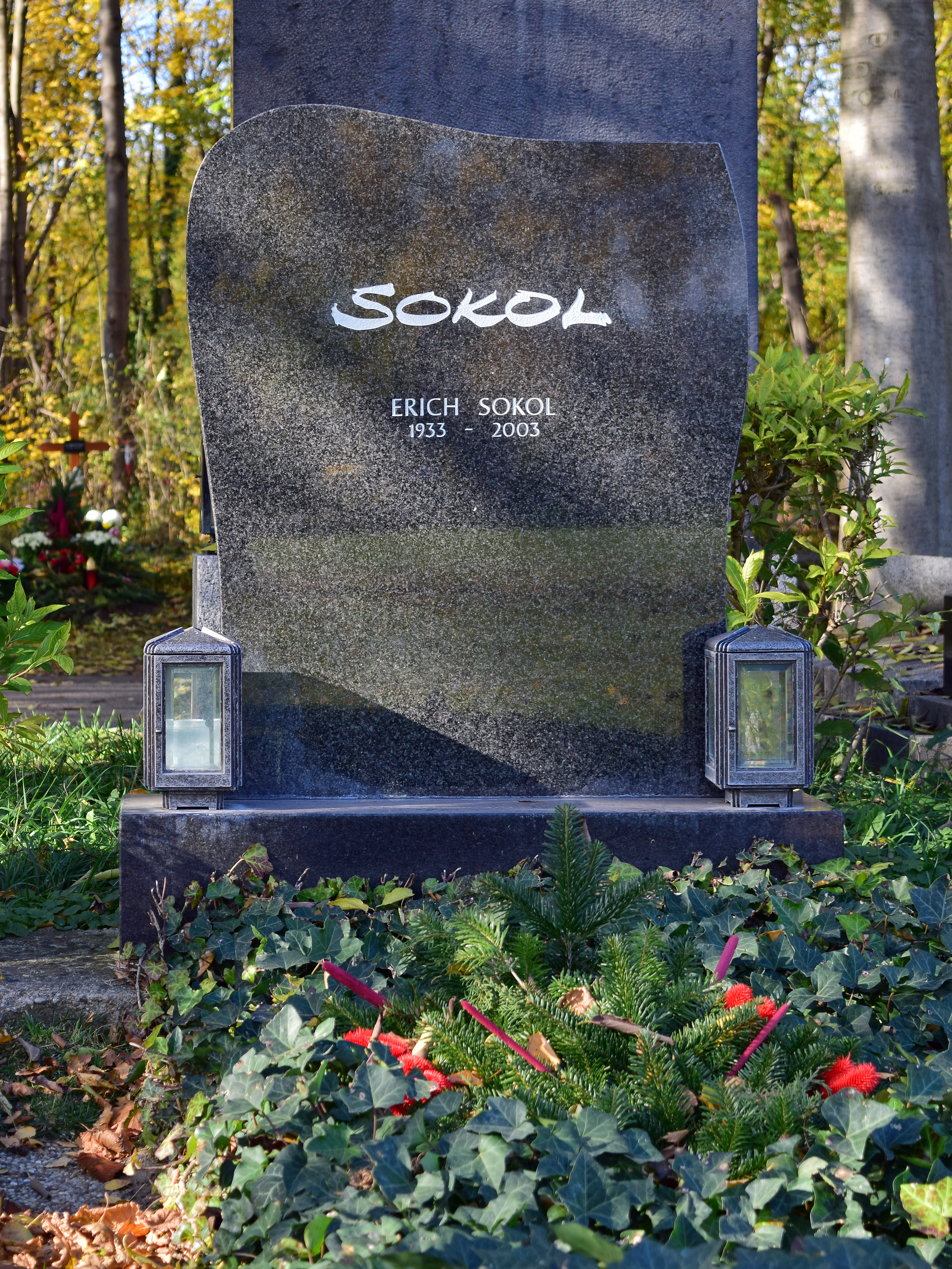
Grave at the Wiener Zentralfriedhof

Sokol died in the night of Thursday, February 20, 2003, at his home in Mödling. He is buried in an honorary grave dedicated by the City of Vienna in the "Ehrenhain" (Group 40, Number 88) of the Vienna Central Cemetery.

The Caricature Museum in Krems (Karikaturmuseum Kreis) awards since 2018 the Erich Sokol Prize for Digital Caricature and Satire.

== Honors ==
Erich Sokol received numerous honors for his artistic work, including:

- The "Artists' Guild of Chicago" prize for "Editorial Art" on the occasion of the "Editorial and Advertising Art" exhibition held at the Chicago Library (1959)
- The "Golden Camera" by "Hörzu" (1971)
- The State Prize for Advertising of the Federal Ministry of Trade, Commerce and Industry for his campaign for Austrian Airlines (1972)
- In 1977, the City of Vienna awarded him the Prize for Applied Art and in 1982 the Golden Decoration of Honor of the City of Vienna.
- In 1986 Erich Sokol received the Nestroy Ring and in 1997 the Medal of Honor for Services to Art and Culture in the City of Mödling.
- The Olaf Gulbransson Prize (2001).
- In 2002 Erich Sokol was announced the title of professor, but the awarding took place posthumously on his 70th birthday.

In 2014, the Prof. Erich Sokol-Promenade was named after him in Mödling, and in 2016, the Erich-Sokol-Gasse was named after him in the 10th district of Favoriten in Vienna.
