= Ingrid Thurnher =

Austrian television presenter

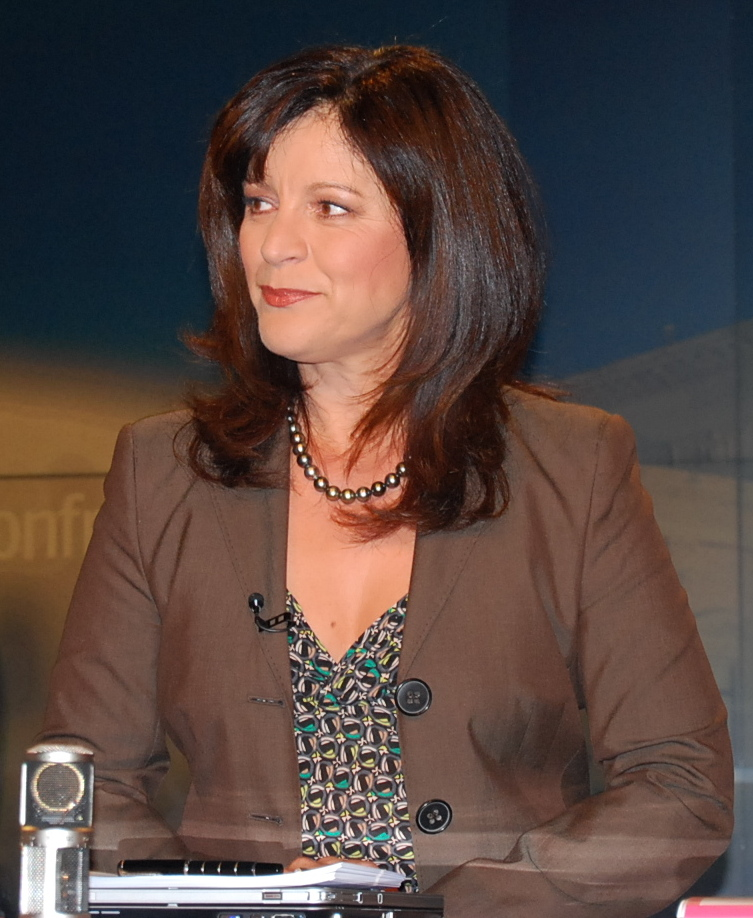
- Thurnher in 2008
- Born: 6 July 1962 (age 64); Bludenz, Voralberg, Austria
- Occupations: News presenter; journalist
- Known for: Director of ORF

Ingrid Thurnher (born 6 July 1962) is an Austrian journalist and television presenter. Since 1 January 2022, she has been the Director of Radio at the ORF. From 9 March 2026, she led the ORF on an interim basis. On 23 April 2026, she was elected Director General by the ORF Board of Trustees until December 2026.

== Bibliography ==
- So reden Sie sich zum Erfolg. Ecowin, Salzburg 2003, ISBN 3-902404-00-0.
- Auf den Spuren des Udo Proksch. Ecowin, Salzburg 2011, ISBN 978-3-7110-0002-6.
