= Radio Steiermark =

Austria
- Broadcast area: Styria

Ownership
- Owner: ORF

History
- First air date: October 1, 1967

Links
- Webcast: web stream
- Website: steiermark.orf.at/studio/tags/radio/

Radio Steiermark is the regional radio for Styria, and is part of the Österreich 2 group. It is broadcast by the ORF. Most of the production for Radio Steiermark is done at ORF Steiermark Landesstudio (regional studio) located in the capital of Styria, Graz.

== Frequencies ==
The most important frequencies:

- Graz: 95.4 MHz
- Bruck/Mur: 93.2 MHz
- Neumarkt: 94.1 MHz
- Liezen: 96.8 MHz
- Schladming: 96.3 MHz
- Mitterbach: 92.8 MHz
- Murau: 96.8 MHz
- Mürzzuschlag: 94.5 MHz
- Knittelfeld: 94.9 MHz
- Eisenerz: 97.3 MHz
- Rechnitz: 100.1 MHz
- Leoben: 97.1 MHz
