= Radio Vorarlberg =

Austria
- Broadcast area: Vorarlberg

Programming
- Format: Soft AC

Ownership
- Owner: ORF

History
- First air date: October 1, 1967

Links
- Webcast: web stream
- Website: vorarlberg.orf.at/radio

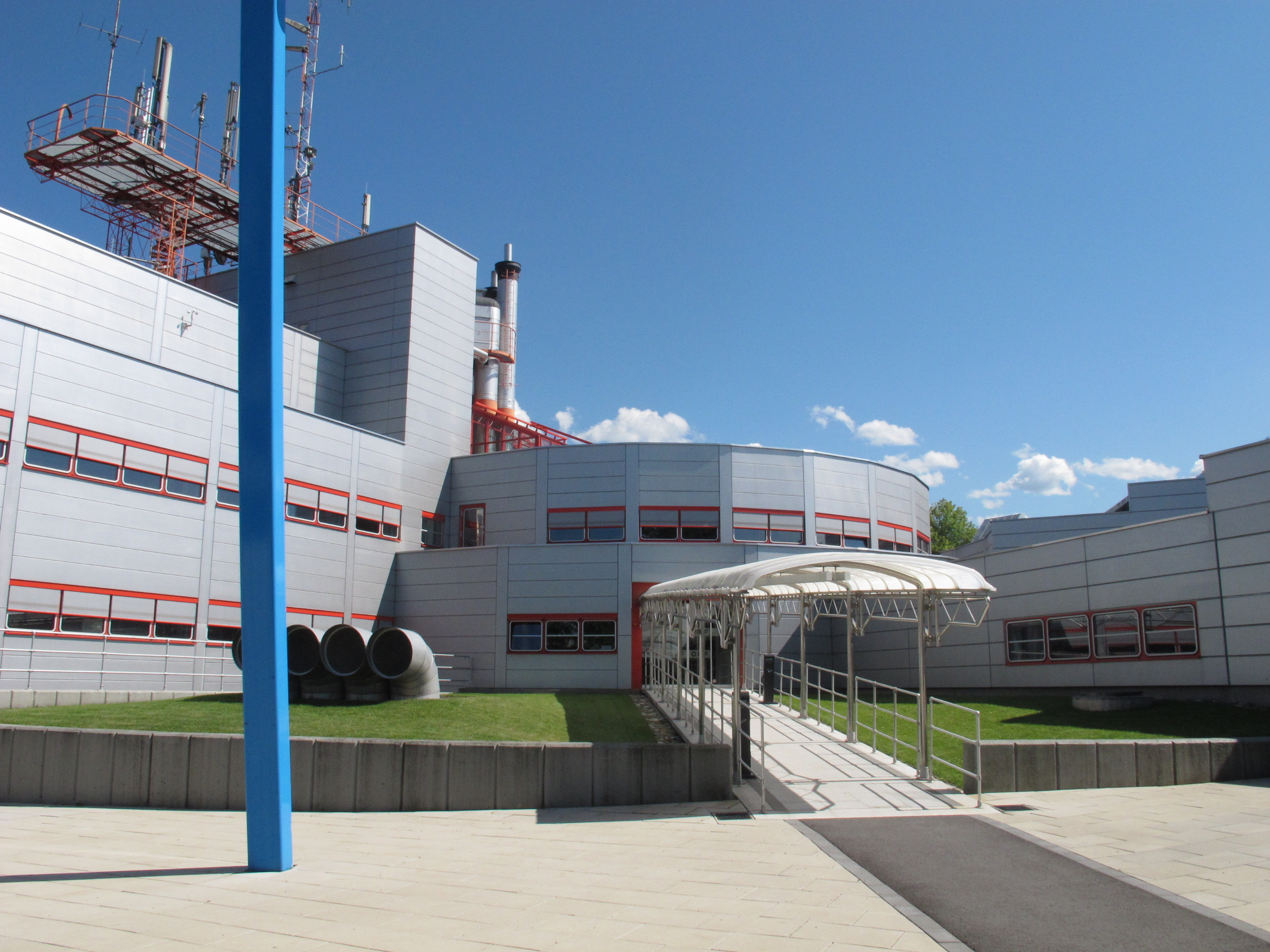
ORF Landesstudio Vorarlberg in Dornbirn

Radio Vorarlberg is the regional radio for Vorarlberg and is part of the Österreich 2 group. It is broadcast by the ORF, and the programs from Radio Vorarlberg are made in the ORF Landesstudio Vorarlberg.
