= Radio Kärnten =

Austria
- Broadcast area: Carinthia

Ownership
- Owner: ORF

History
- First air date: October 1, 1967

Links
- Webcast: web stream
- Website: kaernten.orf.at/radio

Radio Kärnten is the regional radio for Carinthia and is part of the Österreich 2 group.

It is broadcast by the ORF, and the programs from Radio Kärnten are made in the ORF Kärnten Studio. From Monday to Friday at 6.30 pm local time it broadcasts a short information space called “Dreisprachige Nachrichten” (news in three languages) within the program "Servus Srecno Ciao". with short-term news in German, Slovenian and Italian.

The most powerful transmitter located on Mount Dobratsch can easily be tuned to 97.80 MHz in the neighboring border areas, namely the Tarvisio area (UD) and Val Canale.

A collection of the latest programs is archived at: Servus Srecno Hello. The news program “Dreisprachige Nachrichten” can be heard from around the 30th minute.

The music programme is made of oldies music and "Austropop".
