= Tom Turbo =

Austrian book and television series

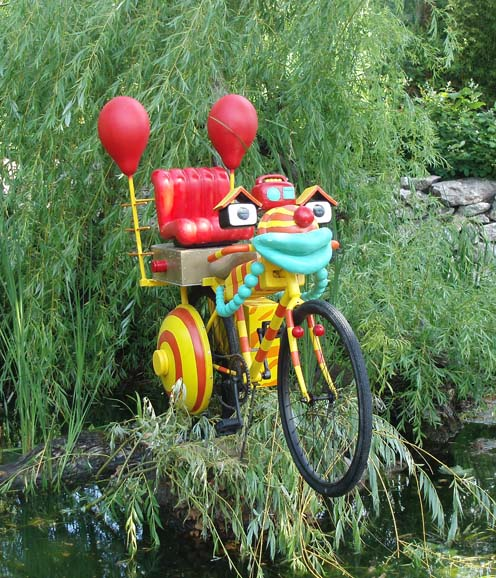
A model of Tom Turbo, the signature talking bicycle from the series.

Tom Turbo is a series of books created by Austrian author Thomas Brezina in 1993. The stories feature Tom Turbo, a bike who is able to talk and do one hundred and eleven tricky things. He and his friends Karo (Karolin Klicker) and Klaro (Konstantin Klicker) try to catch 'the ever bad guy' Fritz Fantom. With each of the original books, a detective gimmick would be delivered which would be used by Karo and Klaro during the current 'case'.

Tom Turbo was built by Karo and Klaro, who had a great supply of fairly new technological items as their parents always wanted to be up-to-date with everything available.

A Tom Turbo television series first appeared in Austria on ORF1 in 1993. Some of the episodes even aired on NICKELODEON in Germany. The bike (represented by an animatronic puppet) has a garage at its filming location, Tiergarten Schönbrunn. In the TV series, the bad guys and also the children 'working' with Tom change every once in a while. Only the 'boss' stays the same: Thomas Brezina.

In 2003 a film originally titled Tom Turbo - Von 0 auf 111 aka TOM TURBO - Der Film directed by Dirk Regel and starring Brezina himself, amongst others, was released.
