= Radio Oberösterreich =

Austria
- Broadcast area: Upper Austria

Ownership
- Owner: ORF

History
- First air date: October 1, 1967

Links
- Webcast: web stream
- Website: ooe.orf.at/radio

Radio Oberösterreich is the regional radio for Upper Austria, and is part of the Österreich 2 group. It is broadcast by the ORF, and the programs from Radio Oberösterreich are made in the ORF Oberösterreich Studio.

Radio Oberösterreich offers a daily program with music, news, sport, culture, weather and traffic service, made for the people in Upper Austria. The target audience is people over 60. The music choice is focused on pop oldies. Sometimes German-speaking modern pop songs are also broadcast, though most of these songs are Austropop. After 6pm and Sunday evenings, Radio Oberösterreich stops broadcasting oldies, but instead focuses on traditional folk music, sport-, culture- and talk-shows.

After the introduction of private radios in 1998, large competing radio stations have grown. Radio stations such as "Life Radio", "Krone Hit", "Radio Arabella" as well as the culture channel Radio FRO have found a large audience. With 420.000 listeners, Radio Oberösterreich is still the regional market leader in the target audience 10+ (Radiotest; 2. quarter 2007).

== Receiving ==
Radio Oberösterreich can be received in all of Upper Austria, as well as surrounding areas. It is also possible to receive Radio Oberösterreich via internet stream and satellite.
