= Radio Salzburg =

Austria
- Broadcast area: Salzburg

Ownership
- Owner: ORF

History
- First air date: 1960

Links
- Webcast: web stream
- Website: salzburg.orf.at/radio

Radio Salzburg is the regional radio for Salzburg, and is part of the Österreich 2 group. It is broadcast by the ORF, and the programs from Radio Salzburg are made in the ORF Salzburg Studio.

== History ==
It was founded in 1960 as the second radio program, after the transmitters were moved from the city Salzburg to the close Gaisberg.

In 1989 Radio Salzburg was the most heard radio in Austria, with a market share of over 55%.

== Coverage ==
Radio Salzburg is the most heard regional radio of ORF, as it is very Salzburg oriented. It is also possible to receive the radio in Germany, till about Ingolstadt. In the state of Salzburg, Radio Salzburg has the second highest market share, only Ö3 with a higher one. The Radio Salzburg only gets competition from the private regional radio Antenne Salzburg, which is very popular among young people.

== Programming ==
Radio Salzburg plays hits from the 1960s up to the modern hits. The series "G´sungen und g´spielt" is also very popular, with real, unchanged folkmusic, Monday to Friday, from 6 to 8pm with Caroline Koller, Fritz Schwärz, Herbert Gschwendtner or Philipp Meikl.
