= Radio Burgenland =

Austria
- Broadcast area: Burgenland

Programming
- Format: Soft AC / Oldies AC

Ownership
- Owner: ORF

History
- First air date: October 1, 1967

Links
- Webcast: web stream
- Website: burgenland.orf.at/radio

Radio Burgenland is the regional radio for Burgenland and is part of the Österreich 2 group. It is broadcast by the ORF, and the programs from Radio Burgenland are made in the ORF Burgenland Studio.
