= Energy Innsbruck =

Private radio station in Vienna, Austria

Energy Innsbruck is a private radio station of Innsbruck that broadcasts from Vienna. The station is part from the NRJ GROUP. It broadcasts to Innsbruck and its surroundings at the Frequency 99,9 MHz from 22 September 2008 and at the Frequencies 107.7 MHz and 93.6 MHz since October 2013. NRJ is known internationally as a youth radio station.

== Frequencies ==
- Innsbruck 99.9 MHz, 107.7 MHz
- Schönberg im Stubaital: 99.9 MHz
- Inzing: 107.7 MHz
- Wattens: 93.6 MHz
- Telfs 107.7 MHz
- Seefeld in Tirol 107.7 MHz
- Schwaz 93.6 MHz
- Jenbach 93.6 MHz
- Hall in Tirol 99.9 MHz , 93.6 MHz
- Rum 99.9 MHz, 107.7 MHz
- Zirl 107.7 MHz

== Transmission towers from Energy Innsbruck ==
- Innsbruck-Schlotthof: 99.9 MHz (INNSBRUCK6)
- Inzing-Stiegelreith: 107.7 MHz
- Wattens: 93.6 MHz

== Program ==
The program is similar to that of the parent station "Energy Wien", including:

- ENERGY Kickstart: Weekdays 5am to 6:45am with Mario Polszter.
- ENERGY Morgenshow: Weekdays 6:45am to 10am with Flo Berger and Matthias Hobiger.
- ENERGY am Vormittag: Weekdays 10am to 2pm with David Schindelböck.
- ENERGY am Wochenende: Saturdays 10am to 4pm with Leni Spitzer.
- ENERGY EuroHot 30: Saturdays 4pm to 6pm with Leni Spitzer.
- ENERGY am Nachmittag: Weekdays 2pm to 7pm with Mario Polszter.
- ENERGY Clubcharts: Fridays 7pm to 9pm with Leni Spitzer.
- ENERGY Clubfiles: Saturdays 8pm to 9pm with Flip Capella.
- ENERGY Mastermix: Nightly 9pm to 11pm with various high-profile DJs.

Every 30 minutes, local news is given for the region of Tirol.
