= Ö2 =

Regional public radio services in Austria

Österreich 2 (Ö2; previously known as Österreich-Regional, ÖR until 1990) is the overall term used to refer the network of nine regional radio services provided by Austria's national public service broadcasting organization ORF.

== Stations ==
The nine Ö2 radio stations, each of which serves one state of the Austrian Federal Republic (plus the Italian province of South Tyrol) are:

- Radio Burgenland, Burgenland
- Radio Kärnten, Carinthia
- Radio Niederösterreich, Lower Austria
- Radio Oberösterreich, Upper Austria
- Radio Salzburg, Salzburg
- Radio Steiermark, Styria
- Radio Tirol, Tyrol (also broadcast in the Italian province of South Tyrol)
- Radio Vorarlberg, Vorarlberg
- Radio Wien, Vienna

These stations' output is broadcast on FM analogue and (for now, Radio Wien only) digital radio, as well as being available via cable, the internet, and satellite (Astra 19.2°E).

== Operation ==
The Österreich Regional stations were launched on 1 October 1967 as part of a major reorganisation of the ORF's radio offerings, which also saw the formation of Ö1 and Hitradio Ö3. This was precipitated by a national referendum held in 1964 whereby more than 800,000 citizens declared themselves to be against ideological appointments of key positions within the Austrian public broadcasting service under the Proporz system. Two years later, a legal regulation of nonpartisan broadcasting was passed by the Austrian National Council (lower house of the Austrian parliament), entailing a relaunch of the ORF radio stations. The ÖR was renamed as Ö2 on 2 May 1990.

The nine stations all broadcast a large amount of regional content as well as offering news, weather, traffic (especially notable was the legendary Autofahrer unterwegs programme, aired 1957–1999), regional reports, and music, all produced in each station's own radio centres (one for each federal state).

During the 21st century, the regional stations – their core target audience being listeners in the 50+ age group – have evolved into Oldies stations in terms of their musical format and this has made them clear market leaders in terms of market share and reach. They chiefly play oldies, Schlager music, and classic hits as well as other musical genres of a less demanding nature. Some of the stations, however, such as Radio Oberösterreich, do also broadcast a certain number of classical music programmes as well as cultural and feature items similar to those aired on the nationwide Ö1 channel. Historically, one of the longest-running Ö2 programmes was the daily Autofahrer unterwegs ("motorists under way"), 15,153 editions of which were broadcast between 1957 and 1999. The popularity of this programme meant that it was broadcast nationwide by all the regional stations.

Until the 1990s, many Ö2 programmes were dominated by popular folk music (Volkstümliche Musik), leading to the network often being derogatorily referred to as "housewives' radio". In the period preceding the time when private, commercial radio stations were finally allowed to broadcast in Austria (at first, regionally only), a number of the Ö2 stations began giving their playlists a more international flavour. The new regional private radio stations, for their part, tried to gain market share by focusing on a contemporary hit radio format, competing more with ORF's nationwide Hitradio Ö3 than with the Ö2 stations. The publicly funded Ö2 radio stations, with their considerably greater financial and staff resources, were better able to hold on to their market share, not only in the radio sector, but also in news journalism as a whole.

With the exception of world news coverage, all regional radio stations produce their own content 24 hours a day, with a lot of regional content. Regional news (generally broadcast every half-hour), detailed journals (Landesrundschau etc.), reports and service elements ensure high listener loyalty. Music programming is chosen through based on many criteria and is mostly made up of oldies, classic hits and even traditional Volksmusik. The balance between different genres varies between the stations; some concentrate on oldies, while others mainly play German schlager and folksy music. During the night, each radio station broadcasts its own automated music program, with breaks for hourly news updates.

Until the mid-1990s, all Ö2 radio stations had the same framing programme, which only got interrupted for a few hours for regional content. This collective radio was first called Österreich Regional but was changed to Österreich 2 in 1990. To expand its programme, the regional studios contributed their own programs, such as Autofahrer unterwegs, Turnier auf der Schallaburg ("Tournament at the Schallaburg") and other formats. After the introduction of computers to radio broadcasting in the late 1990s, production costs were significantly reduced, which allowed the ORF to fully regionalize its radio. The name Österreich 2 was eliminated completely, as all regional radio stations now carry the name of their state.

== See also ==
- ORF regional studios
