= Radio Tirol =

Austria
- Broadcast area: Tyrol; South Tyrol

Ownership
- Owner: ORF

History
- First air date: October 1, 1967

Links
- Webcast: web stream
- Website: tirol.orf.at/radio

Radio Tirol is the regional radio for Tyrol and the German-speaking population of South Tyrol, and is part of the Österreich 2 group. It is broadcast by the ORF, and the programmes from Radio Tirol are made in the ORF Tirol Studio.

== History ==
The first radio broadcasting tryouts in Tyrol started in 1926 in Aldrans close to Innsbruck. The history of the ORF Tirol Studio reaches back to the 1945 built "Sendergruppe West. This group had 2 studios, one in Tyrol and one in Vorarlberg. In 1952 the transmitters were handed over to the state government of Tyrol. The program was mixed, from news and information shows to classical music, radio dramas and other features. In the literature department of Radio Tirol, talents like Axel Corti, Otto Grünmandl or Bert Breit were found. During 1954 and 1956 the Sendergruppe West was integrated into the ORF.

Radio Tirol officially started its program on 1 October 1967 as the ÖR-Radio Tirol. In 1972 the ORF Tirol Studio was opened in the Saggen of Innsbruck. ORF Tirol did not only produce Radio Tirol, but also TV shows for Österreich Bild, from 1988 also the regional news "Tirol heute". In 1992 the old marketing name ÖR, which stood for Österreich Regional, was discontinued and Ö2 was used from then on. After the introduction of nationwide private radios, Ö2 was pushed further back and all regional radios got names following the scheme "Radio (State)", in the case of Tyrol "Radio Tirol".

== Coverage ==
Radio Tirol broadcasts mainly in Tyrol. The music line-up consists mostly of oldies and folk music.

Radio Tirol is produced and broadcast from the ORF Tirol Studio. From time to time Radio Tirol also produces special programs in connection with ski-ing events.

== Other radio stations ==
There is a private radio station in South Tyrol, which also calls itself Radio Tirol, because of the village close by which is also called Tirol. This radio station also used to broadcast its program in the area around Innsbruck, but this frequency was taken over by Radio Südtirol 1.
