= Radio Wien =

- Austria
- Broadcast area: Vienna

Programming
- Format: Soft AC

Ownership
- Owner: ORF

History
- First air date: 1955

Links
- Webcast: web stream
- Website: wien.orf.at/radio

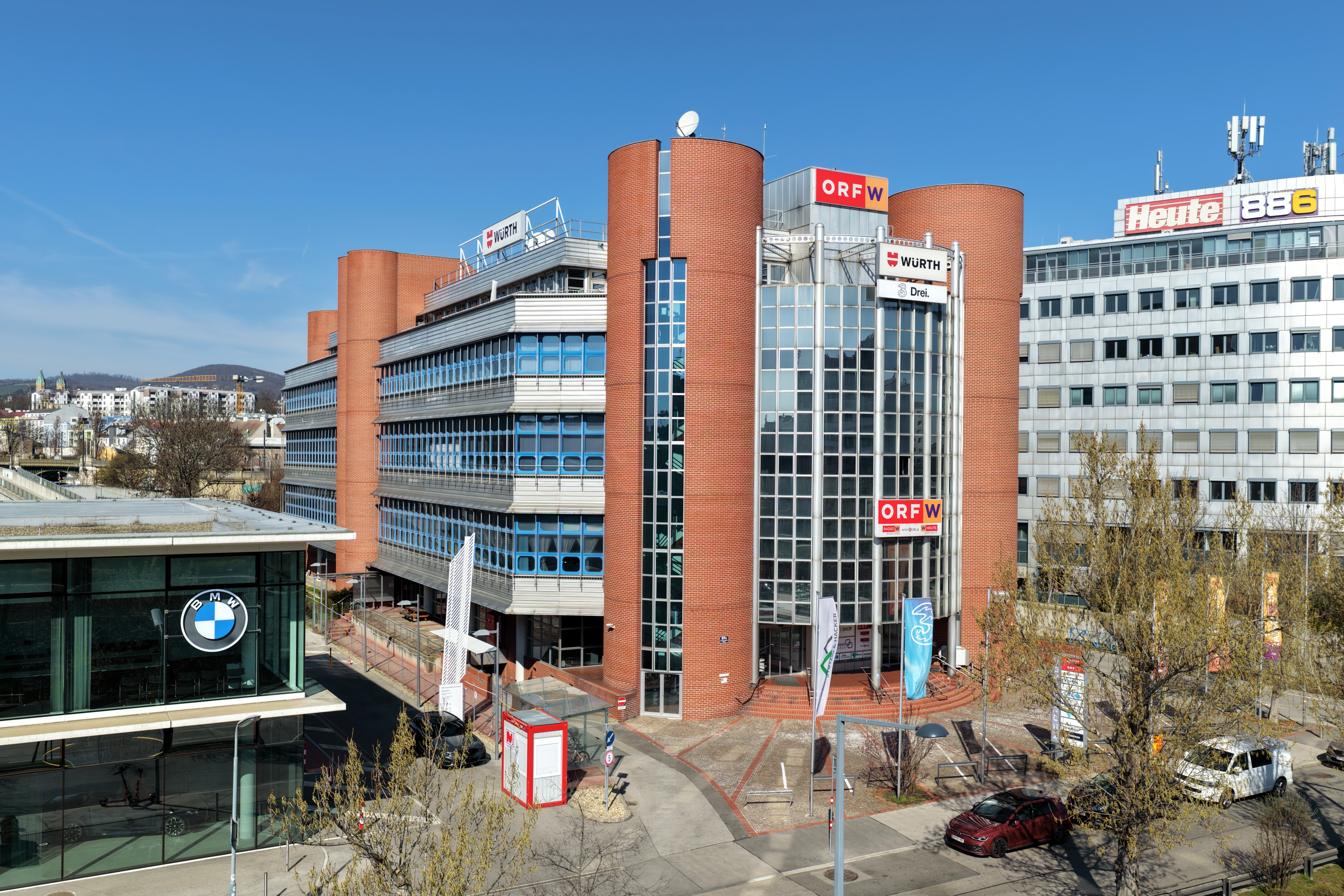
Radio Vienna headquarters

Radio Wien (lit. 'Radio Vienna') is the regional radio for Vienna, and is part of the Österreich 2 group. It is broadcast by the ORF, and the programs from Radio Wien are made in the ORF Wien Studio.

== Music ==
Radio Wien plays pop and rock music, often old songs but also newer ones. Most songs are sung in English but you can also hear German, Italian, French, Spanish and Portuguese.

Here are some examples of artists whose songs are played:

- from Austria: Wolfgang Ambros, Falco, Rainhard Fendrich, Kurt Ostbahn, S.T.S.
- from the rest of the world: ABBA, The Beach Boys, The Beatles, Bee Gees, Billy Joel, Blondie, Bruce Springsteen, Cher, Chris Rea, Creedence Clearwater Revival, David Bowie, Electric Light Orchestra, Elton John, Elvis Presley, Hot Chocolate, KC and the Sunshine Band, Madonna, Michael Jackson, Mike and the Mechanics, Phil Collins, Prince, Queen, Robbie Williams, Rod Stewart, The Rolling Stones, Stevie Wonder, Supertramp, Tina Turner, Toto, U2

== Presenters ==
- Sascha BOCTOR
- Carola GAUSTERER
- Alexander GOEBEL
- Pamela GRÜN
- Alex JOKEL
- Gerd KRÄMER
- Angelika LANG
- Martin LANG
- Christian LUDWIG
- Leila MAHDAVIAN
- Peter POLEVKOVITS
- Robert STEINER & Ratte ROLF-RÜDIGER
- Peter TICHATSCHEK
- Bernhard VOSICKY

== Traffic ==
- Karoline BOCTOR
- Heidi MISOF
- Bruni EIGNER

== Reporters ==
- Hadschi BANKHOFER
- Rainer KEPLINGER
- Julia KORPONAY-PFEIFER
- Robert JAHN
- Bernhard WEIHSINGER
- Ewald WURZINGER
- Ingrid REHUSCH

== Weather ==
- Gerald HOLZINGER
