= Ö1 =

Austrian national radio station

Österreich 1
- Austria
- Broadcast area: Austria parts of Germany, Hungary, Czech Republic, Switzerland, Slovakia, Italy, Liechtenstein, Slovenia, Europe (via Astra.
- Frequencies: FM: 87.6 – 104.5 MHz; DVB-S: Astra 1N - 12.66275 GHz, transponder 115; DVB-C; DAB+ (South Tyrol only)

Programming
- Language: German
- Format: Classical music, High culture

Ownership
- Owner: ORF

History
- First air date: 1 October 1945; 81 years ago (successor to ORF Erstes Programm)
- Former call signs: Alpenland (in British-occupied zone); Radio Wien I (in Soviet-occupied zone); Radio Rot-Weiß-Rot (in American-occupied zone); Sendegruppe West (in French-occupied zone); ORF Erstes Programm (1955–1967)

Links
- Webcast: Web Stream; Stream URL
- Website: oe1.orf.at

Österreich 1 (Ö1) is an Austrian radio station: one of the four national channels operated by Austria's public broadcaster ORF. It focuses on classical music and opera, jazz, documentaries and features, news, radio plays and dramas, Kabarett, quiz shows, and discussions.

== History ==
Ö1 logo used from 2012 until 2017

The channel was launched on 1 October 1967 as part of an exercise which saw the ORF's radio output reorganized into three numbered services, the other two being the regional stations grouped as Ö2 and the pop music channel Ö3.

Earlier, in 1964, there had been a petition for a national referendum, whereby more than 800,000 citizens declared themselves against ideological appointments of key positions within the public broadcasting service by the Austrian grand coalition government of Chancellor Alfons Gorbach (ÖVP) and Vice-Chancellor Bruno Pittermann (SPÖ) according to the Austrian Proporz system. Two years later, a legal regulation of a nonpartisan broadcasting was passed by the National Council parliament, entailing a relaunch of the ORF radio stations.

Ö1 was designated to comply with the public educational mandate (Bildungsauftrag) and to offer a broadly cultural program for an artistically inclined audience. One focus is on news broadcasts like the one-hour Mittagsjournal ("Noon Journal") and Morgenjournal ("Morning Journal"), launched in the course of the coverage of the 1968 Prague Spring. Beside established programmes such as Du holde Kunst, first aired in 1945, Ö1 since the 1970s has also broadcast radio documentaries (Hörbilder), music programmes beyond the strictly classical canon (Pasticcio, Spielräume), and several recurring reports on everyday life in a feuilleton style like Der Schalldämpfer by Axel Corti (discontinued upon his death in 1993). Similar to other classical music radio stations, Ö1 has to bear with the tension between an elitist "Hofrat widow broadcaster" and a "Classic FM" popularisation, with the station's style and scheduling a matter of ongoing debates.

== Operation ==
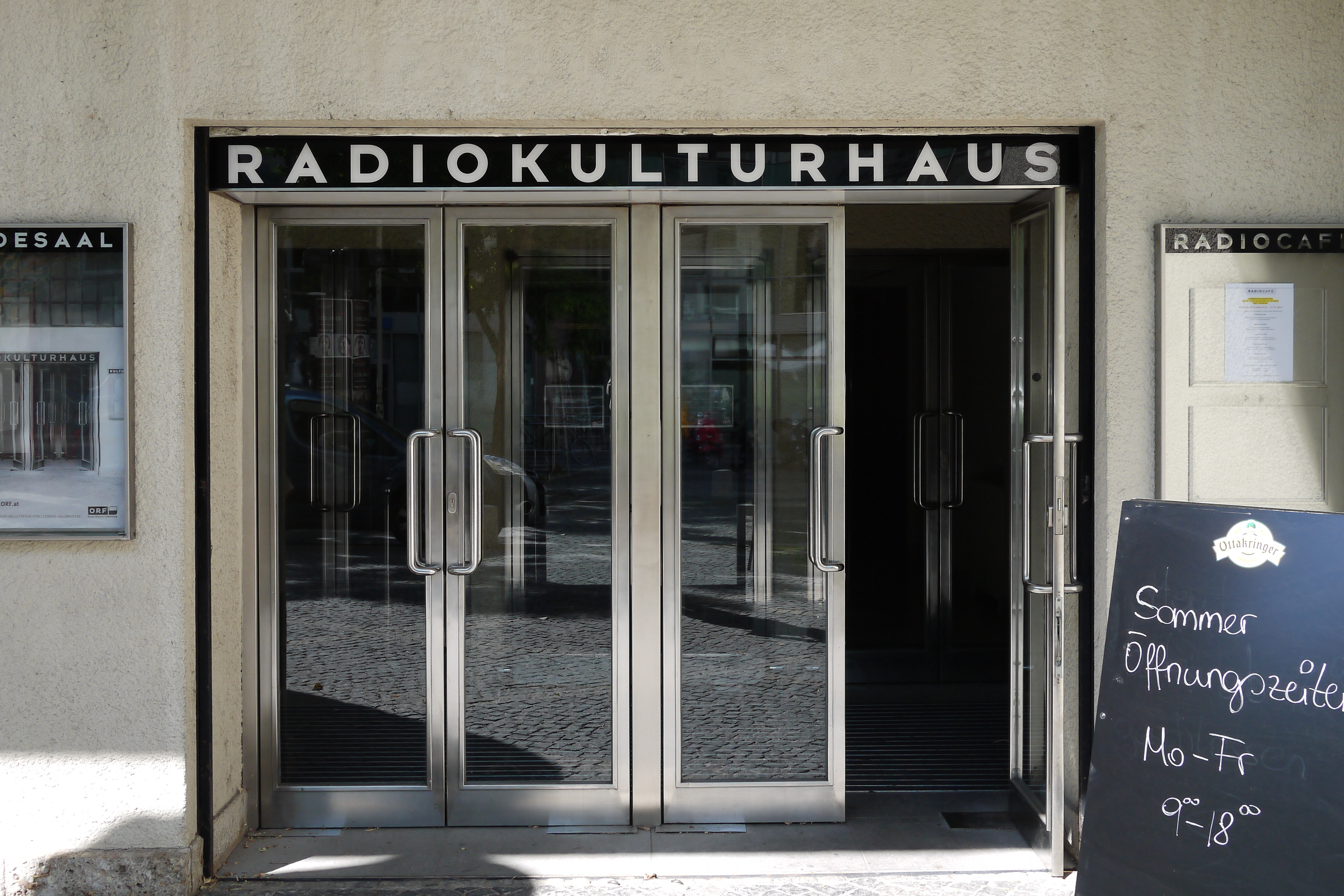
RadioKulturhaus entrance, Vienna

After having broadcast from Funkhaus Wien on Argentinierstrasse in the Wieden district of Vienna for decades, the station moved to the ORF-Zentrum at Küniglberg in the Hietzing district in late 2022. The current station identification was composed by the jazz musician Werner Pirchner in 1994, the slogan Ö1 gehört gehört—a pun on "to be heard" in German conforming with "ought to"—was created by the author Wolf Haas. The interval signal of Ö1 is a three-note chord, played on a viola. There were two earlier versions of the signal: first one was played by harpsichord and the second one by a synth.

Since 2010 a 75-minute altered block of programming is broadcast every morning on the shortwave frequencies of former Radio Österreich International as Ö1 International. Ö1 internet radio can also be listened to live on the ORF website through streaming audio, the programmes can also be heard for a week after broadcast at no charge. Several are available as downloads and podcasts.

Ö1 runs the RadioKulturhaus venue in Funkhaus Wien including the KulturCafé coffee house. It also participates in the annual Donauinselfest music festival.

== Programs ==
Name	Theme	Notes
Alte Musik – neu interpretiert	Music	Presented by Bernhard Trebuch, live from the ORF KulturCafé.
Ambiente – von der Kunst des Reisens	Travel	Specializing in Western Europe, presented by Ursula Burkert
Apropos Oper	Music	Magazine of the Vienna State Opera
Contra – Kabarett und Kleinkunst	Culture	Information on various theatre groups
Der Guglhupf	Culture	Satire, Cabaret (discontinued in 2009)
Diagonal – Radio für Zeitgenoss/innen	Culture and society	Weekly magazine on arts, culture, politics and new music releases
Dimensionen – die Welt der Wissenschaft	Science	Various articles on science and history topics
Du holde Kunst	Culture	Presentation of artists and their work
Erfüllte Zeit	Religion	Features on world religions
Ex libris – das Bücherradio	Literature	Modern book discussions and analyses
Ganz Ich - Wohlfühlen mit Ö1	Society	Information on leading a healthy and fit life
gehört.gewusst. - das Ö1 Quiz	Quizshow	Chaired by Doris Glaser
help - das Konsumentenmagazin	Consumerism	Consumer information, tips and help
Hörbilder	Culture	Information and geography of foreign countries
Kabarett direkt	Culture	Stories related to the season at that time
Ö1 Klassik-Treffpunkt	Music	Interviews live from the ORF KulturCafé
Kontext – Sachbücher und Themen	Information	Magazine on various topics and their facts
Kunstradio – Radiokunst	Music	Documenting the arts
Leporello: Menschen – Moden – Lebenskunst	Culture	Reports on current events, trends and phenomena in arts, society and culture
Matinee live	Music	Live music broadcast in Dolby Digital
matrix – computer & neue medien	Information Technology	Computers and new media
Menschenbilder	Society	Portraits of famous musicians
Mittagsjournal	News	Midday news magazine
Moment – Leben heute	Society	A magazine looking at modern life
Morgenjournal	News	Morning news magazine
Motive – aus dem evangelischen Leben	Religion	For Protestants
Pasticcio	Music	Short classical pieces
Patina	Curiosities	Interesting discoveries from the ORF archives
Praxis – Religion und Gesellschaft	Religion and Society	How society and religion mix
Radiogeschichten	Culture	Biographies of famous artists
Radiodoktor - das Ö1 Gesundheitsmagazin	Health	Magazine on health topics
Radiokolleg	Information	Varied topics
Religion Aktuell	Information	News about religion
Rudi Radiohund	Children	Stories and games
Spielräume	Music	Mo-Fr 17.30-17.55
Synchron – das Filmmagazin	Movies	Latest film reviews and commentaries
Terra incognita	Culture	Portraits of different countries and their culture
Texte – neue Literatur aus Österreich	Literature	Readings of Austrian short stories
Tonspuren	Culture	Portraits of book and play authors
Von Tag zu Tag	History	Different styles and different truths in historical science
Europajournal	News	Background reporting about current EU and European affairs

== See also ==
- List of radio stations in Austria and Liechtenstein
