= ORF (broadcaster) =

Austrian national public broadcaster

Österreichischer Rundfunk

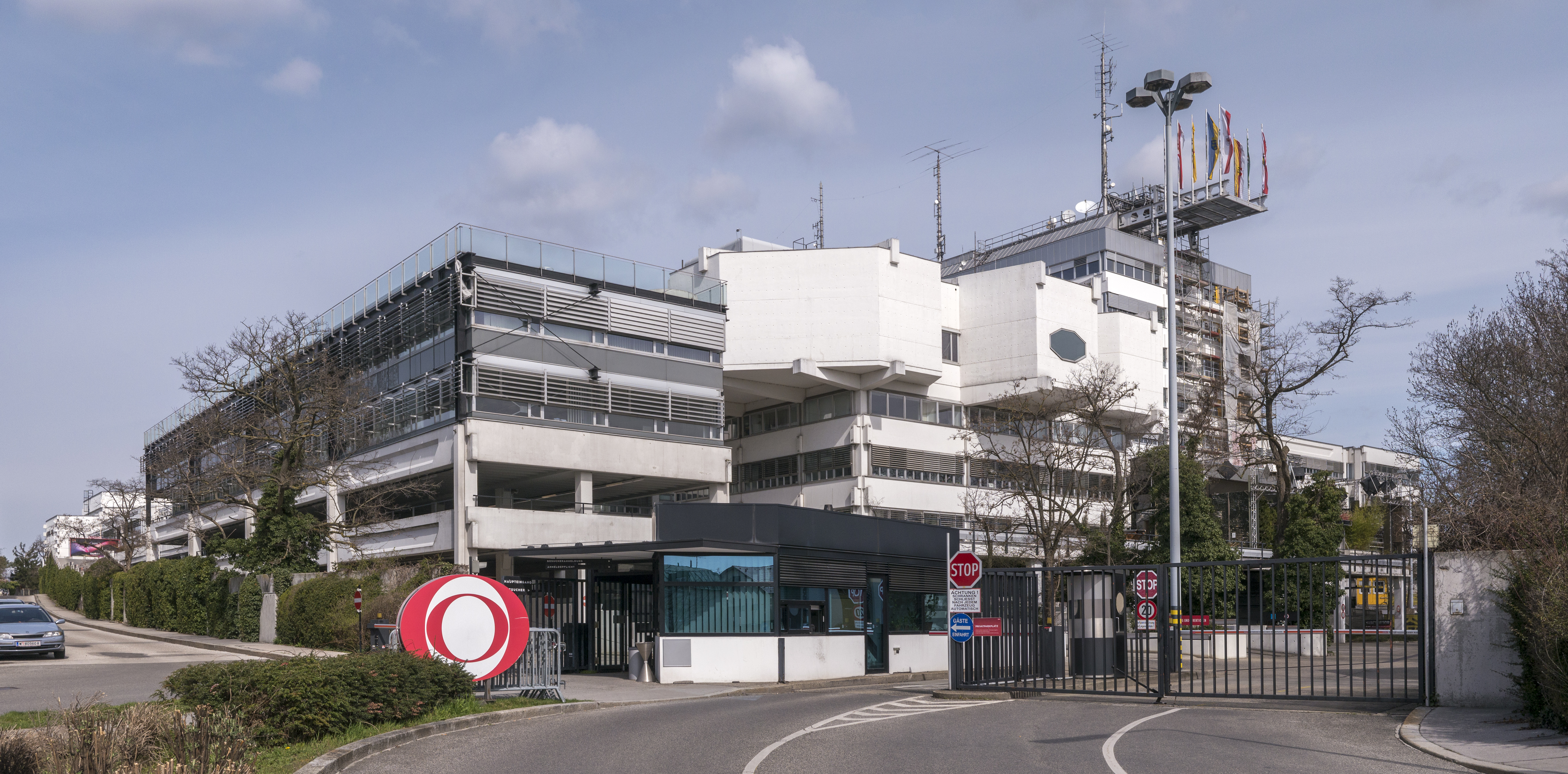
- ORF-Zentrum Küniglberg (headquarters), designed by Roland Rainer and constructed from 1968 to 1975
- Type: Television and radio network
- Country: Austria
- Availability: Austria; parts of Czech Republic, Germany, Hungary, Italy, Liechtenstein, Slovakia, Slovenia and Switzerland
- Headquarters: ORF-Zentrum, Hugo-Portisch-Gasse 1, 1136 Wien, Vienna
- Key people: Roland Weißmann (Director General)
- Launch date: 1 August 1955; 71 years ago
- Former names: Ravag (Radio Verkehrs AG)
- Official website: www.orf.at der.orf.at

Österreichischer Rundfunk (ORF [oːɛʁˈɛf]; German pronunciation: [ˌøːstəʁaɪçɪʃɐ ˈʁʊntfʊŋk], lit. 'Austrian broadcasting') is the national public broadcaster and news website of Austria. Funded from a combination of television licence fee revenue and limited on-air advertising, ORF is the dominant player in the Austrian broadcast media. Austria was the last country in continental Europe after Albania to allow nationwide private television broadcasting, although commercial TV channels from neighbouring Germany have been present in Austria on pay-TV and via terrestrial overspill since the 1980s.

== History of broadcasting in Austria ==
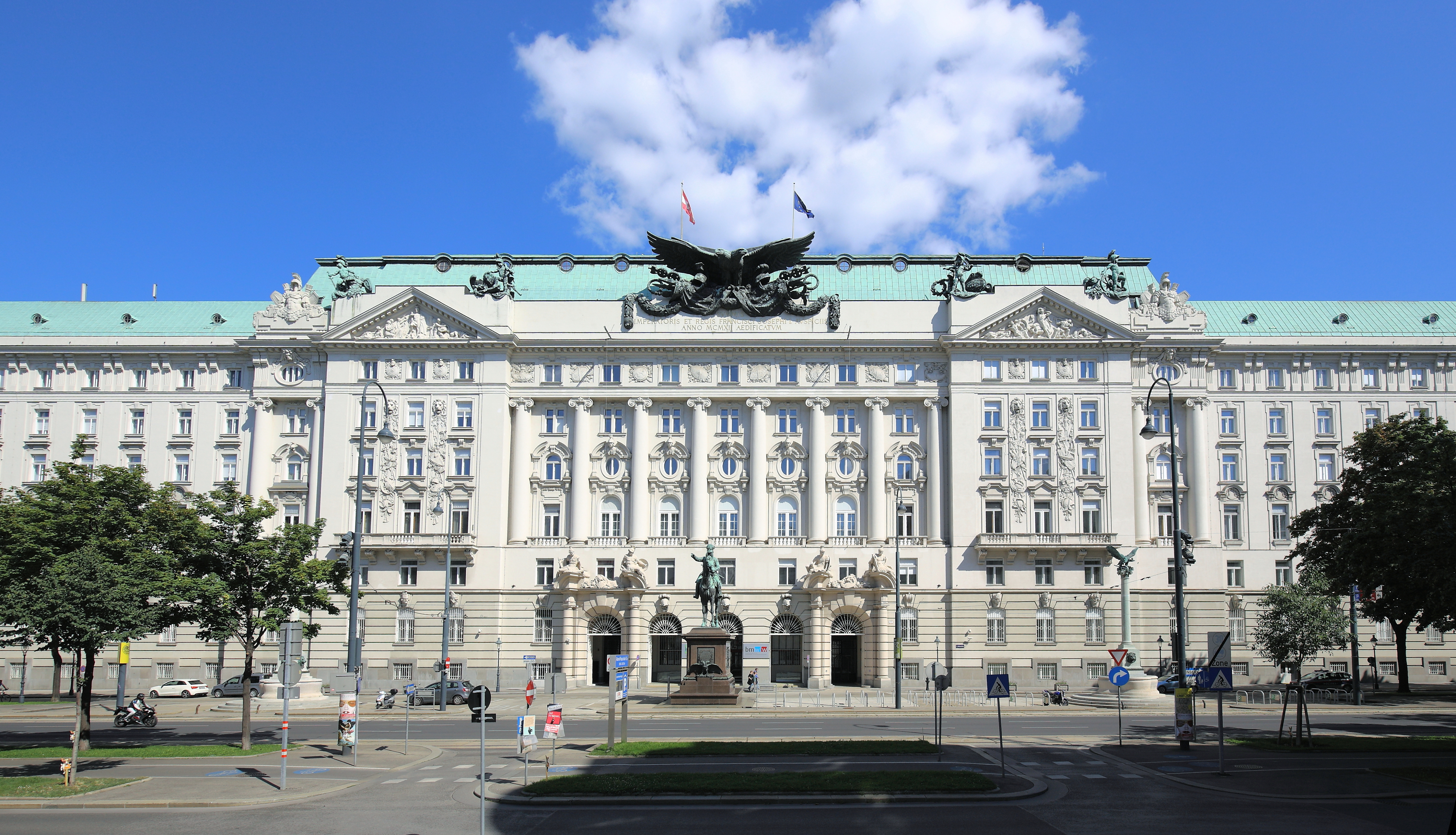
Former War Ministry, RAVAG seat from 1924

The first unregulated test transmissions in Austria began on 1 April 1923 by Radio Hekaphon, run by the radio pioneer and enthusiast Oskar Czeija (1887–1958), who applied for a radio licence in 1921; first in his telephone factory in the Brigittenau district of Vienna, later in the nearby TGM technical college. On 2 September, it aired a first broadcast address by Austrian President Michael Hainisch (1858–1940). One year later, a powerful transmitter, designed by the German Telefunken company, was installed on the roof of the former War Ministry building in Ringstraße in central Vienna.

=== Radio Verkehrs AG ===
It was, however, the public Radio-Verkehrs-Aktiengesellschaft ('Radio Communication Company Ltd', RAVAG), a joint venture of the Austrian Federal Government, the City of Vienna and several bank companies, which, in February 1924, was awarded the concession to begin broadcasting, with Czeja as its director-general. Regular transmissions began on 1 October 1924 from provisional studios inside the War Ministry building that was to become known as Radio Wien (Welle 530). By the end of October 1924 it already had 30,000 listeners, and by January 1925 100,000. Relay transmitters, established across the country by 1934, ensured that all Austrians could listen to Radio Wien at a monthly fee of two schillings.

Radio programmes often aimed at an educated audience, featuring classical music, literature, and lectures. Early RAVAG shows, however, already catered to children and "arts and crafts" (e.g. Bastelstunde). The first outside broadcasts aired in 1925, transmitted from the Vienna State Opera and the Salzburg Festival. On the other hand, news broadcasts only played a minor part out of deference to the Austrian press and the 'neutralism' policy of the federal government (the July Revolt of 1927 was not even mentioned). Nevertheless, also regular sportscasts began in 1928 and in 1930 the Austrian legislative election was comprehensively covered. At that time, RAVAG registered about 500,000 listeners, having become a mass medium.

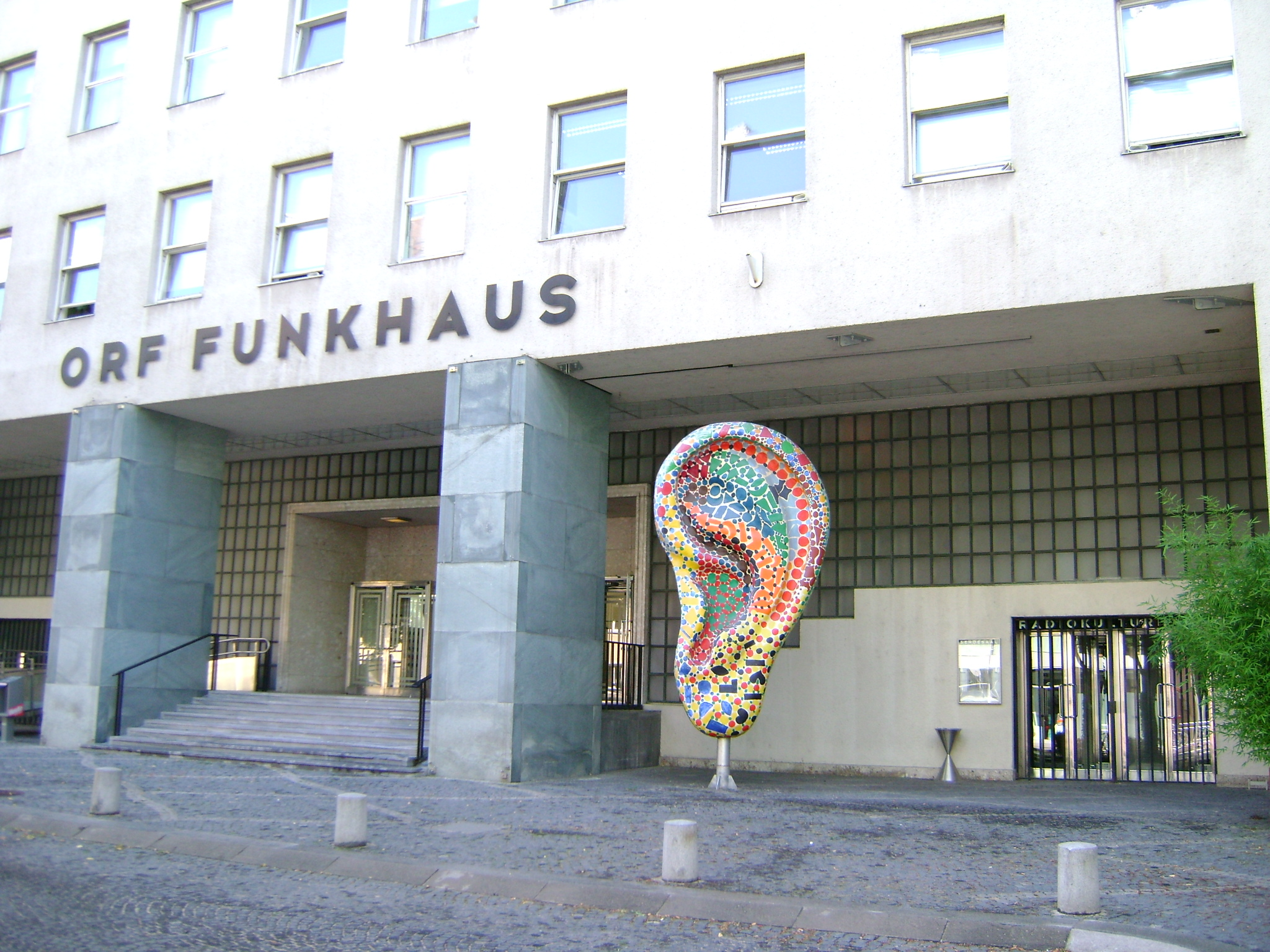
Front and side entrances of the Funkhaus Wien at Argentinierstraße in Vienna, today chiefly a centre for the production of radio programmes

In the course of the abolition of the First Austrian Republic and the implementation of the Austrofascist Ständestaat by Chancellor Engelbert Dollfuß in 1934, the RAVAG studios were armed during the Austrian Civil War in February, as well as by the protagonists of the Nazi July Putsch, when several insurgents entered the studio and had Dollfuß's resignation announced (he actually was killed in his occupied Chancellery office). Dollfuß's successor Kurt Schuschnigg (1897–1977) had the demolished broadcasting centre replaced by the new Radiokulturhaus building (present-day Funkhaus Wien) near the Theresianum academy in Wieden, Vienna, designed by Clemens Holzmeister (1886–1983) and erected from 1935 to 1939. The Austrian government widely used RAVAG broadcasts for propaganda activities, defying massive cross-border Nazi propaganda broadcasts aired from German transmitters in the Munich region, but also promoted the live transmission of mass celebrations.

=== Reichssender Wien ===
With the Austrian Anschluss to Nazi Germany and the invasion of Wehrmacht troops in 1938, RAVAG was dissolved and replaced by Reichssender Wien subordinate to the national Reichs-Rundfunk-Gesellschaft network (Großdeutscher Rundfunk from 1939) in Berlin, where programmes were also produced from. One of the last RAVAG transmissions was Schuschnigg's farewell address on 11 March 1938 ('God Save Austria'). Only hours later, live broadcasts featured the cheering devotees of his Nazi successor Arthur Seyss-Inquart (1892–1946), the triumphant entry of Adolf Hitler in Linz the next day, and his speech on Heldenplatz in Vienna. In 1939, the former RAVAG transmission facilities were taken over by the German Reichspost.

In World War II, listening to Feindsender ('enemy radio stations') became a capital offence, however, such stations such as the Swiss Radio Beromünster as well as the German-language programmes of the BBC, Voice of America (VOA) and Vatican Radio, were widely used information sources. Reichssender Wien transmissions were important for strategic bombing alerts. The Funkhaus broadcasting centre itself was damaged by Allied bombs in January and February 1945, followed by the Red Army Vienna Offensive. Reichssender Wien last aired 6 April, before retiring Schutzstaffel troops blew up the Bisamberg transmitter.

=== Radio Wien ===
Following the Wehrmacht defeat, independent Austrian RAVAG radio broadcasting resumed in Allied-occupied Austria 24 April 1945, when it announced the formation of a provisional Austrian state government led by Karl Renner (1870–1950). A new Radio Wien station was founded, broadcasting from Funkhaus Wien by a provisional transmitter on the rooftop, once again under Oskar Czeija, who nevertheless was ousted shortly afterward on pressure by the Soviet military administration. As the Funkhaus was located in the Soviet occupation sector of Vienna, the Western Allies established their own radio stations like the Alpenland network on British-occupied territory, Radio Rot-Weiß-Rot on US-occupied territory, Sendegruppe West on French-occupied territory, as well as the American English-speaking 'Blue Danube' armed forces network (BDN; not to be confused with the later Blue Danube Radio) and the British Forces Network (BND), which became quite popular with younger Austrian listeners. The RAVAG/Radio Wien transmissions were limited to the Eastern Austrian Soviet occupation zone, and as the Cold War progressed was increasingly considered Communist propaganda broadcasting.

Several other radio stations began broadcasting in the different occupation zones and radio became a popular medium among Austrians: in 1952 there were 1.5 million radio sets in Austrian homes. The Western Allies could operate their programmes nationwide from Vienna, with a significantly higher popularity rating than the outdated RAVAG transmissions. In 1955, the various regional stations were brought together as the Österreichisches Rundspruchwesen ('Austrian Broadcasting Entity') which later, in 1957, became the Österreichischer Rundfunk GmbH, forerunner of today's ORF.

== Radio stations ==
- Ö1 – ORF's cultural and principal news channel
- Hitradio Ö3 – pop music channel
- FM4 – channel for (alternative) youth culture

The former Ö2 has been replaced by nine regional channels (one for each Bundesland, or federal state):

- Radio Burgenland
- Radio Kärnten
- Radio Niederösterreich
- Radio Oberösterreich
- Radio Salzburg
- Radio Steiermark
- Radio Tirol
- Radio Vorarlberg
- Radio Wien
- Radio Slovenski

All of these radio channels are broadcast terrestrially on FM and via the digital service of the SES Astra satellites at 19.2° east.

All of ORF's domestic radio channels are also streamed over the internet. An extra 24-hour all-news channel is available exclusively via internet: this is Ö1 Inforadio which relays all of Ö1's news content and fills the 'gaps', during which Ö1 is transmitting music and cultural programmes, with additional news broadcasts.

An additional service, Radio 1476, formerly broadcast on medium wave each evening from 18.00 until just after midnight. Its schedule was a mixture of items from Ö1, programmes for linguistic and cultural minorities, folk music, and special productions.

== Television channels ==
- ORF 1
- ORF 2 (with regional programmes)
- ORF 2 Europe
- ORF III
- ORF Sport +
- ORF Kids
- 3sat (in association with ARD, ZDF and SRF)

The ORF television channels are broadcast terrestrially and via the SES Astra 1H satellite at 19.2° east. Via satellite ORF 1 and ORF2 are encrypted, allowing only Austrian residents who pay the Austrian television licence fee (GIS) to watch them. ORF2 Europe is unencrypted and receivable via satellite in Europe.

ORF is a supporter of the Hybrid Broadcast Broadband TV (HbbTV) initiative that is promoting and establishing an open European standard for hybrid set-top boxes for the reception of broadcast TV and broadband multimedia applications with a single user interface. From 6 March 1995 ORF broadcasts 24 hours a day.

== Regional studios ==
The ORF has one regional studio in each state, where each state produces its own radio and state television, which is broadcast over ORF2. The regional studio in Tyrol, also produces regional television and radio for the German-speaking population of South Tyrol, Italy. Even though each state has its own studio, most ORF productions are heavily focused on Vienna, since most shows are made there.

== Funding ==
The ORF is funded by a television license fee, which since 1998 has been administered by its subsidiary Gebühren Info Service (GIS). The amount payable differs by state. As of 2022, Styria has the highest annual television licence cost, at €343.80, and Salzburg and Burgenland have the highest annual radio licence cost, at €94.92. Annual fees from July 2022 are:

State	Television	Radio
Burgenland	€341.40	€94.92
Carinthia	€330.60	€92.52
Lower Austria	€339.00	€93.72
Upper Austria	€269.40	€75.72
Salzburg	€325.80	€94.92
Styria	€343.80	€94.92
Tyrol	€317.40	€88.92
Vorarlberg	€269.40	€75.72
Vienna	€339.00	€94.20

From January 2024, as part of reforms to the ORF tabled by the Nehammer Cabinet, the GIS organisation will be abolished and its associated TV licensing fee is expected to be replaced with a new compulsory ORF household tax, administered by ORF-Beitrags Service GmbH. As a result, some loopholes such as removing the antenna or tuner from television sets in order to declare them "GIS-Free" and hence exempt from the GIS fee (declared legal in a report to the Austrian Parliament in 2008, and confirmed as such by the Supreme Administrative Court of Austria in 2015, hence creating a market for selling regular and smart TVs without built-in antennas or tuners) will be closed under the new system.

== Presenters ==
According to surveys the most prominent television presenter in the country is former alpine skier Armin Assinger who is the host of the Millionen-Show, Austria's version of Who Wants to Be a Millionaire?. Mirjam Weichselbraun, a former MTV presenter is co-host of Dancing Stars, Austria's edition of Dancing With the Stars. The most popular comedy show on ORF is Wir sind Kaiser ('We Are Emperor') with comedian Robert Palfrader playing Emperor Robert Heinrich I, inviting celebrity guests to make fun of them.

The best known news anchors are talk show host Ingrid Thurnher who was given seven Romy awards as most popular presenter; Armin Wolf who is best known for his hard-hitting interviews on the late evening news show ZiB 2; and Gabi Waldner, moderator of the weekly political magazine Report.

== Logos ==
The ORF's first corporate logo, called the 'ORF eye', was designed by the Austrian illustrator and cartoonist Erich Sokol in 1968, who also served as ORF's chief graphics artist and later as art director from 1967 until 1992. The 'ORF eye' logo is often compared to the 'CBS Eye' logo used by the American commercial broadcaster CBS. In 1992, ORF commissioned the British graphic designer Neville Brody to design its current corporate logo, which was soon nicknamed the 'ORF bricks'. The 1968 'ORF eye' logo however continued to be used sporadically (for example on the title cards of Zeit im Bild) until it was completely phased out in 2011.

'ORF eye' logo (1968–1992; sporadic use until 2011)

On-screen wordmark (1968–2000)

'ORF bricks' logo (1992–present)

== See also ==
- Vienna Radio Symphony Orchestra
