= Channel 2 =

Channel 2 or TV 2 may refer to:

== Television networks, channels and stations ==
- Channel 2 (Iran), an Iranian television channel
- Channel 2 (Israel), an Israeli television channel
  - Channel 2 (Israel, 1986–1993), a defunct Israeli television channel
- Channel 2 (Latvia), entertainment and music television in Latvia
- Channel 2 (Syrian TV channel), a Syrian television channel
- TV 2 (Danish TV channel), a publicly owned station
- TV2 (Hungarian TV channel), a commercial station
  - TV2 Klub
- M2 (TV channel), or Magyar TV2, a Hungarian TV channel
- TRT 2, or TV2, Turkey
- TV2 (Malaysian TV network), a Malaysian television channel
- TV 2 Direkte, formerly TV 2, a Norwegian commercial TV channel
- TV2 (Virgin Islands TV channel), a cable channel
- Castilla–La Mancha TV 2, Spain
- France 2, a public television channel in France
- La 2 (Spanish TV channel), a Spanish television channel operated by RTVE
  - La 2 Cat, a Catalan version of La 2
- ZDF, a public television channel in Germany
  - ZDF 2, a defunct German television channel
- Yle TV2, a Finnish television channel operated by Yle
- ABC2, the former name of Australian television channel ABC TV Plus
- América 2 or Canal 2, a commercial station in Buenos Aires, Argentina
- BBC Two, a public television channel in the United Kingdom
- bTV Action, or TV2, a commercial station in Bulgaria
- Canal 2 Rock & Pop, a defunct Chilean television channel
- Canal+ 2, a subscription television channel in Spain
- Canal Nou Dos, a channel in Spain which broadcasts in Valencian
- CHEX-TV-2, a privately owned station in Durham Region, Ontario, Canada
- Conexión TV Canal 2, a privately owned station in Costa Rica
- Channel 2 (El Salvador), a television channel owned by Telecorporación Salvadoreña
- DWWX-TV, a defunct television station in Metro Manila, Philippines and the former flagship station of ABS-CBN
- DZMV-TV, or Channel 2, a television station in Metro Manila, Philippines and the flagship station of All TV owned and operated by Advanced Media Broadcasting System (AMBS)
- Latina Televisión, or Frecuencia 2, a commercial televisión station in Lima, Perú
- Kanal 2, a privately owned station in Estonia
- KBS2, an entertainment channel in South Korea
- VRT Canvas, formerly Canvas and BRTN TV2, Belgium
- NPO 2, formerly Nederland 2 and TV2, a public television channel in the Netherlands
  - NPO 2 Extra, a Dutch television channel
- TVN (Panamanian TV network), a commercial television station in Panama
- Rai 2, or TV2, a public television channel in Italy
- RTÉ2, a public television channel in Ireland
- RTP2, formerly TV2, a public broadcast station in Portugal
- SABC 1, formerly TV2, a state-owned channel in South Africa
- Stöð 2, the former name of Icelandic television channel Sýn (TV channel)
- SVT2, formerly TV2, a television channel in Sweden
- Televicentro (Canal 2), a nationwide terrestrial channel in Nicaragua
- Tele Antillas Canal 2, a privately owned station in the Dominican Republic
- Telecanal, a private television channel
- TV2 (Turkish TV channel), a commercial station in Turkey
- TVNZ 2, formerly TV2, New Zealand
- Unitel Bolivia, a commercial television station in Bolivia
- Las Estrellas, a Mexican commercial television network assigned virtual channel 2 nationwide
- WCBS-TV Channel 2, a CBS-affiliated station in New York, United States
- KTVU Channel 2, a Fox-owned station in San Francisco, California, United States which is branded as KTVU FOX 2
- KCBS-TV Channel 2, a CBS-owned station in Los Angeles, California, United States which is also the CBS network’s west coast flagship affiliate
- Fiji Two, a Fijian television channel
- Channel 2 (Posadas, Argentina)
- CDR Canal 2, a Costa Rican television channel
- Canal 2 Cochabamba Corazón de América, a television station in Cochabamba, Bolivia
- Channel 2 (Egypt), an Egyptian television channel
- TV SLO 2, a Slovenian television channel
- HRT 2, a Croatian television channel
- TVCG 2, a Montenegrin television channel
- BBS 2, a Bhutanese television channel
- TVK2, a Cambodian television channel
- CCTV-2, a Chinese television channel
- Saudi 2, a defunct Saudi Arabian television channel
- KTV2, a Kuwaiti television channel
- NTA2, a Nigerian television channel in Lagos
- RTI 2, an Ivorian television channel
- VTV2, a Vietnamese television channel
- SRF zwei, a Swiss German-language television channel
- RTS Deux, a Swiss French-language television channel
- RSI La 2, a Swiss Italian-language television channel
- ORF 2, an Austrian television channel
  - ORF 2 Europe
- La Deux, the former name of Belgian French-language television channel Tipik (TV channel)
- ERT2 Sport, a Greek television channel
- NHK Educational TV, a Japanese television channel using virtual channel 2 nationwide
- TVB J2, the former name of Chinese-language Hong Kong television channel TVB Plus
- DR2, a Danish television channel
- VTM 2, a Belgian Dutch-language television channel
- RTLZWEI, a German television channel
- RTL Zwee, a television channel in Luxembourg
- TVR 2, a Romanian television channel
- Belarus-2, a Belarusian television channel
- Dvojka, a Slovak television channel
- BFBS 2, a defunct television channel of the British Forces Broadcasting Service
- Kanāls 2, a defunct Latvian television channel
- KNR2, a Greenlandic television channel
- Television Tonga 2, a Tongan television channel
- RTSH 2, an Albanian television channel
- TV2, an alternative name of Samoan television channel EFKS TV
- ARD 2, a defunct German television channel
- CBC-2, a proposed Canadian television channel
- Teledos (Peruvian TV channel), a defunct Peruvian television channel
- SBC 2, a Seychellois television channel
- RFO 2, the former name of Tempo (RFO), a defunct French television channel
- TVM2, one of the former names of TVM+, a Maltese television channel
- El Watania 2, a Tunisian television channel
- DD 2, another name for DD Metro, a defunct Indian television channel
- UT-2 (TV channel), a defunct Ukrainian television channel
- DDF2, later DDR2, both former names of DFF Länderkette, a defunct German television channel

== Other uses ==
- TV-2 (band), a Danish pop-rock group
- TV 2 Group, Norwegian media company
- Train Valley 2, a 2018 video game sometimes referred to as TV2
- Lockheed TV-2 Seastar, an American jet trainer aircraft
- 2channel, a Japanese Internet forum sometimes referred to as "Channel 2"
- 2TV, an Irish music programme broadcast on Network 2 television, 1995–2001

== See also ==
- 2chan (disambiguation)
- 2CH (disambiguation)
- Lists of television channels
- Channel 2 branded TV stations in the United States
- Channel 2 virtual TV stations in Canada
- Channel 2 virtual TV stations in the United States
- VHF frequencies covering 54-60 MHz:
  - Channel 2 TV stations in Canada
  - Channel 2 TV stations in Mexico
  - Channel 2 digital TV stations in the United States
  - Channel 2 low-power TV stations in the United States
