= Television in Tonga =

Television in Tonga was introduced in 1983. Most television stations that appeared before 2000 were private in nature. A national service appeared only in 2000 when the Tonga Broadcasting Commission opened Television Tonga with assistance from TVNZ's Pacific Services division. Doulos Broadcasting Network, a Christian channel, is available in the Tongatapu Group. Subscription TV also exists.

== History ==
An NHK team visited and filmed Tonga in 1962. The Tongan king ruled out the introduction of television in the mid-1960s, but was aware of a possible implementation for educational uses. An NHK offer to introduce television was suggested in 1974.

The first television station to appear in Tonga was VAP-TV18, also known as Vision of Pilolevu, owned by Siaosi Polutele Guttenbeil. It started broadcasting a three-and-a-half hour schedule, though not daily, as a "do-it-yourself" operation. In the same month, Tevita Tupouniua, who had envisioned a cable system for Tonga as early as 1982, registered his company ASTL-TV3, with assistance from American company Clearview International, who was also bringing cable TV to Thailand. ASTL started broadcasting in 1984, with television companies in operation, Nuku'alofa alone had no less than 300-400 television sets.

The success of ASTL-TV3 caused its owner to convert it into the first pay television station in the country, with 300 subscribers by 1986 and a variety of programs recorded off tapes from the United States. VAP-TV18 also moved to a subscription system in September 1984, however, the station closed in 1987 and Polutele returned to his previous job as a repairman.

TVNZ almost gained support in Tonga in the early 1990s, but the applicant, the Oceania Broadcasting Network, opposed the plan because of TVNZ's openness. OBN was operated by Christopher Racine, part of a Hawaii-based fundamentalist Evangelical group. The launch of OBN triggered a change at ASTL-TV3, prompting the station to go free-to-air and increasing both revenue and manpower. By 1993 it was still airing US programs taped off Hawaiian TV stations. The station shut down in 1996, leaving OBN alone.

In the late 1990s, TVNZ's Pacific Services announced that it provided equipment for Television Tonga. Further assistance came from RFO Polynésie. Broadcasts started in 2000, in addition, a second TV channel was given to OBN.

Television Tonga started a second channel in 2008. Television Tonga 2 launched with an assortment of foreign programmes and a six-hour relay of CCTV-9 International.

== Digital and pay-TV ==
Tonfön Television, owned by Tonfön, started in 2002, with in-house channels and relays of foreign news channels. It was created to provide an alternative to free-to-air television, especially OBN. In 2008, Digicel acquired Tonfön and absorbed it into its services. Digicel set up DigiTV, a paid digital terrestrial television service.

In 2013, TBC was in the midst of converting its two channels to digital, with a tentative 2016 switchover date. TBC executive Solomone Finau made a trip to the Netherlands in order to obtain the necessary equipment.
