= Doulos Broadcasting Network =

- Country: Tonga

History
- Founded: 2001; 25 years ago
- Launched: 2001; 25 years ago

Doulos Broadcasting Network (also known as DBN) is a Tongan Christian television station, affiliated with the US-based Trinity Broadcasting Network. As of 2011, the station was located close to the TBC facility in Nukuʻalofa which combined a church and a television production facility. It received a satellite feed of the main TBN network from the NSS-9 satellite and was equipped with a Teko transmitting tower. Unlike Television Tonga, which broadcast on VHF, DBN broadcast on UHF.

DBS was reported to only cover the islands of the Tongatapu Group, in southern Tonga, where most of the population lives. 70% of its programming was sourced from the TBN relay; the remaining 30% was local programming.

The station was commissioned on 2 May 2001 and started broadcasting weeks later. Its founder was Reverend Isileli Taukolo.

DBN's viewpoint on the conversion to digital TV differed from TBC as of 2015 when the decision to implement digital terrestrial television was taken that year. In June-July 2016, it, alongside A3Z (OBN) and Television Tonga were airing Tuku ifi Leva (Quit Smoking Now), part of a campaign against smoking.
