= KACV =

KACV may refer to:

- KACV-FM, a radio station (89.9 FM) licensed to Amarillo, Texas, United States
- KACV-TV, a television station (channel 8) licensed to Amarillo, Texas, United States
- the ICAO code for Arcata-Eureka Airport
