= 3sat =

German cultural television channel

- Country: Germany
- Broadcast area: Germany, Austria, Switzerland, Liechtenstein
- Network: ZDF, ORF, SRG SSR, ARD
- Headquarters: Mainz, Germany

Programming
- Language: German
- Picture format: 720p HDTV

History
- Launched: 1 December 1984; 41 years ago
- Replaced: ZDF 2

Links
- Website: www.3sat.de

Availability

Terrestrial
- Digital terrestrial television: Channel slots vary within location
- Digital terrestrial television (Austria): Channel slots vary within location

Streaming media
- 3sat.de: Watch live (Switzerland, Liechtenstein, Germany, Austria only)

3sat (German pronunciation: [ˈdʁaɪ̯ˌzat], Dreisat) is a free-to-air German-language public service television channel. It is a generalist channel with a cultural focus and is jointly operated by public broadcasters from Germany (ZDF, ARD), Austria (ORF) and Switzerland (SRG SSR). The coordinating broadcaster is ZDF, at whose Mainz facility the broadcasting centre with studios for in-house productions is located.

== History ==
3sat was established to broadcast cultural programmes, originally by satellite. The network was founded as a cooperative network by Germany's ZDF, Austria's ORF, and Switzerland's SRG SSR (formerly SRG SSR idée suisse). 3sat began broadcasting on 1 December 1984, with its first programme being simulcasted on FS2, TV DRS and ZDF. ZDF leads the cooperative, though decisions are reached through consensus of the cooperative's partners.

In 1990, DFF, television broadcaster of the German Democratic Republic became a cooperative member of 3sat, and a name change to 4sat was considered. Eventually, it was decided to keep the original 3sat name. DFF's membership of 3sat was dissolved on 31 December 1991, as DFF itself ceased to exist under Germany's Unification Treaty.

On 1 December 1993, ARD joined 3sat as a cooperative member. This followed ARD's shutdown of its satellite channel, Eins Plus. 3sat is available on the European Astra satellites at 19.2° east, on cable television, and in Austria and Germany on digital terrestrial television.

In 2003, 3sat was available in 40 million households in Germany, Austria, and Switzerland, and 85.5 million across Europe. Since June 2003 3sat has been using a new on-air look and logo. The logo has a red rectangle surrounding the number three.

In 2005, 3sat and n-tv were criticised for broadcasting TV shows which were funded by relief organizations such as World Vision Deutschland and Christoffel Blindenmission.

In 2008, the programs nano and Kulturzeit received a new on-air look and studios. At the "Eyes & Ears of Europe Awards", the design of Kulturzeit's studio was awarded first prize in the category "Best Study Design" at Medientage München in 2008.

In 2009 3sat had a market share of 1.1% in Germany, 1.9% in Austria, and 1.2% in Switzerland.

As a result of ZDF's spending for the then-new ZDFkultur, 2011 saw the end of many long-term 3sat broadcasts such as 3satbörse, Foyer, the computer and internet magazine neues, the animal show Arche Noah, the legal magazine Recht brisant, Vivo and others.

On 1 April 2017, the Direktion Europäische Satellitenprogramme, which was responsible for the 3sat and Arte programs, was dissolved. Joint editorial teams replaced it with the other ZDF channels.

== Logos ==
3sat logo from 1 December 1984 to 30 November 1993

3sat logo from 1 December 1993 to 31 May 2003 (The four squares symbolize the broadcasters ARD, ZDF, ORF and SRG SSR.)

3sat logo from 1 June 2003 to 5 February 2019 (The red square symbolizes the four broadcasting stations.)

3sat HD logo from 30 April 2012 to 5 February 2019
