= OBN Television =

OBN Television or OBN TV may refer to:

- OBN (TV channel), in Bosnia and Herzegovina
- Oceania Broadcasting Network, in Tonga
