= FilmFernsehFonds Bayern =

Media promotion company in Bavaria, Germany

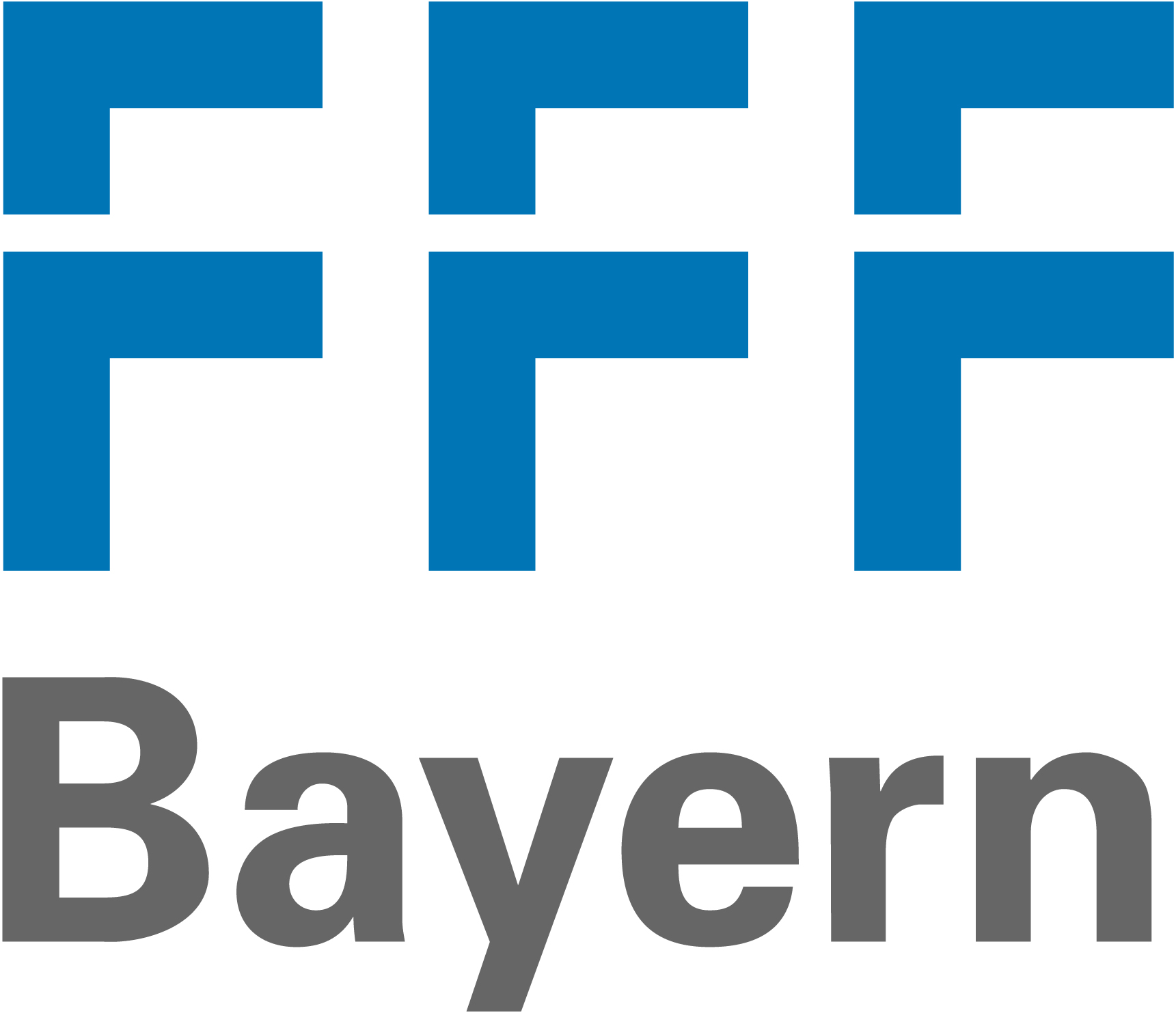
- Company type: Media fund
- Industry: Media
- Founded: 1996
- Headquarters: Munich, Germany
- Area served: Bavaria
- Parent: Bayerische Staatskanzlei
- Website: www.fff-bayern.de/en/

FilmFernsehFonds Bayern (FFF Bayern, or just FFF) is a company whose goal is to promote media in Bavaria, Germany. The fund has its headquarters in Munich.

== Mission and aim ==
Since its founding in 1996, FFF Bayern has had the task of carrying out quantitative and high-quality film funding in Bavaria as well as additional services for the film industry. Its aim is to create and develop a powerful and competitive film and television industry in the state.

== History ==
On 1 March 1996, the fund was founded at the Bavarian Film Center Geiselgasteig. The president and CEO at the time was Herbert Huber and his deputy was Klaus Schaefer. The chairman of the board was Bavarian Minister of Culture Hans Zehetmair.

In 1999, the Bayerische Staatskanzlei took over the responsibility for the fund, and Minister of State Erwin Huber became chairman of the FFF. That year, the fund participated for the first time in the Medientage München ('Munich media days'). Since 1999, FFF awards prizes at the Dokumentarfilmfestival München ('documentary film festival Munich') and the Regenburger Kurzfilmwoche ('Regensburger short film week'). To assist in the financing of film productions, HypoVereinsbank, the BayernLB, Bankhaus Reuschel & Co., and the LfA Förderbank Bayern founded the Bavarian Bank Fund (BBF) in 2000.

In 2003, the first film agreement was signed in Quebec between the regional Canadian film funding Société de développement des entreprises culturelles and the FFF.

In 2005, FFF Bayern presented for the first time its award for film journalism at Filmfest München.

Since 2009, FFF Bayern has supported the introduction of digital technology in film productions and in film projection in theaters. The fund also promotes culturally and educationally sophisticated computer games.

== Shareholders ==
The shareholders of the fund are the Free State of Bavaria, the Bayerische Landeszentrale für neue MedienBavarian ('regulatory authority for new media'), the Bayerischer Rundfunk, ZDF, the private broadcaster ProSiebenSat.1 Media, and RTL Television.
