= Highland Park School District =

Highland Park School District may refer to:

- Highland Park Schools (Michigan)
- Highland Park School District (New Jersey)
- Highland Park Independent School District (Dallas County, Texas)
- Highland Park Independent School District (Potter County, Texas)
