= WHNH-CD =

Television station in Hartford, Connecticut

- Hartford, Connecticut; United States
- City: Manchester, etc., Vermont (nominal city of license, to move to Hartford, Connecticut)
- Channels: Digital: 2 (VHF), to move to 25 (UHF); Virtual: 2

Programming
- Affiliations: 2.1: Daystar; 2.2: Daystar Español

Ownership
- Owner: Daystar Television Network; (Word of God Fellowship, Inc.)

History
- Founded: January 24, 1996
- First air date: March 1998
- Former call signs: W49BU (1996–1998); WVBK-LP (1998–2003); WVBK-CA (2003–May 2013); WVBK-CD (May–October 2013); WYCX-CD (2013–2021)
- Former channel number: Analog: 49 (UHF, 1998–2004), 2 (VHF, 2004–2013)
- Former affiliations: Independent (March–October 1998, January–June 2000, 2024–2025); UPN (October 1998–January 2000); America One (June 2000–2003); Outside TV (2003–2013, 2021−2022); Retro TV (2013–2018); Heroes & Icons (2018–2021); This TV (2022–2024)
- Call sign meaning: Hartford—New Haven

Technical information
- Licensing authority: FCC
- Facility ID: 26996
- Class: CD
- ERP: 3 kW; 8 kW (CP)
- HAAT: 459.9 m (1,509 ft)
- Transmitter coordinates: 41°42′13″N 72°49′55″W

Links
- Public license information: Public file; LMS
- Website: www.daystar.com

WHNH-CD (channel 2) is a low-power, Class A religious television station serving Hartford, Connecticut, United States, but nominally licensed to Manchester, Vermont. Owned by the Daystar Television Network, the station maintains a transmitter on Rattlesnake Mountain in Farmington, Connecticut.

== History ==
A construction permit for what is now WHNH-CD was granted on January 24, 1996, for operation on UHF channel 49, to serve Manchester, Vermont; the new station was issued the call sign W49BU. The original owners, Heritage Broadcasting Company of New York (who had applied for channel 49 in 1994, several months before selling Fox affiliate WXXA-TV (channel 23) in Albany, New York, to Clear Channel Communications), sold the station to Vision 3 Broadcasting on June 19, 1997. Vision 3 modified the permit to add Londonderry, Vermont, as a second city of license on January 8, 1998. The station was designed to be a repeater of WVBG-LP (channel 25) from Albany; however, when channel 49 signed on in March 1998 as an independent station, it was the second of Vision 3's three stations to launch, after W39CE (channel 39, later renamed WVBX-LP) in Easton, New York, which signed on in December 1997. WVBG-LP itself would not go on the air until August 1998. Channel 49 became WVBK-LP on April 24, 1998.

On October 5, 1998, WVBK-LP, along with parent station WVBG-LP, became a UPN affiliate; it already carried the UPN Kids block, but the network's prime time programming had previously been seen in the Capital District through secondary affiliations with WXXA-TV and Pax station WYPX-TV (channel 55), as well as cable carriage of WSBK-TV from Boston. The lineup of UPN and syndicated programming was supplemented by several sports packages, including Big East football and basketball, the Boston Red Sox (the telecasts of which were dropped following a territorial complaint by the New York Yankees), and the Boston Celtics.

The UPN affiliation ended at the start of 2000 when cable-only "WEDG-TV" (known later as "UPN 4") signed on as a joint operation between Time Warner Cable and WXXA-TV. WVBK-LP would then revert to being an independent station, heavily emphasizing its status as a primarily over-the-air station; that June, Vision 3 put its sister stations, WVBG-LP and WVBX-LP, up for sale, and by 2001 much of the station's schedule was taken up by programming from America One and the Resort Sports Network (RSN), the predecessor to Outside Television. While WVBG-LP was sold to Wireless Access in 2001 (subsequently moving to channel 41 in Greenwich) and WVBX-LP was sold to Venture Technologies Group in 2003 (subsequently moving to channel 15 first as WNYA-CA in Albany, then as WEPT-CA in Kinderhook), Vision 3 kept WVBK-LP, making it a separate station. America One was dropped in 2003, making the station a full RSN affiliate. The station moved to channel 2 in 2004 and upgraded to class A status.

On February 28, 2005, Vision 3 purchased the construction permit for W47CS (channel 47) in Windsor from MTC North, who was granted the permit on April 22, 2003. Vision 3 changed its call letters to WVBQ-LP on June 16, 2005, moved the station to Newport and Charlestown, New Hampshire on February 16, 2006, and signed it on that March as a satellite of WVBK-CA.

Vision 3 filed to sell WVBK-CA and WVBQ-LP to New Hampshire 1 Network, a company controlled by William H. Binnie, in November 2010; the deal was called off in June 2011. Vision 3 then filed to sell WVBQ-LP to Cross Hill Communications that November; under the terms of the deal, Cross Hill also held an option to acquire WVBK, which was exercised in June 2012. Under Cross Hill, the station increased its local programming, branding as YCN, an initialism for "Yankee Communications Network"; its programming added a half-hour weeknight newscast (which originally aired at 6 p.m. with repeats at 6:30 p.m. and from 10 to 11 p.m., and as a result was initially branded as YCN News Hour).

WYCU-LD began broadcasting in digital on channel 26 in December 2012; although this facility was applied for as WVBQ's digital companion channel, Cross Hill ended broadcasts on analog channel 47 on December 20, 2012, and returned the analog WVBQ-LP license to the FCC, which canceled it on January 3, 2013. Channel 26 had changed its call letters from WVBQ-LP to WYCU-LD on December 13, 2012. In May 2013, WVBK-CA converted to digital broadcasts; on October 18, it changed its call letters to WYCX-CD. Following their digital conversions, WYCX-CD and WYCU-LD added subchannels to carry RTV, Tuff TV, and PBJ.

The station changed its call sign to WHNH-CD on October 12, 2021.

On October 3, 2024, the FCC approved Vision Communications' proposal to move WHNH-CD's RF channel to 25, and its city of license to Hartford, Connecticut, although the change has not taken place yet.

On November 20, 2024, the Daystar Television Network filed to purchase WHNH-CD for $7.5 million; the sale was completed on January 29, 2025.

== Technical information ==
=== Subchannels ===
The station's signal is multiplexed:

Subchannels of WHNH-CD
Subchannel	Res.	Short name	Programming
2.1	1080i	WHNH-CD	Daystar
2.2	720p	WHNH-ES	Daystar Español
2.3	480i	WHNH-SD	Daystar SD

=== Analog-to-digital conversion ===
WHNH-CD (as WVBK-CA) shut down its analog signal, over VHF channel 2, in May 2013, and "flash-cut" its digital signal into operation VHF channel 2.

== See also ==
- Channel 2 digital TV stations in the United States
- Channel 2 low-power TV stations in the United States
- Channel 2 virtual TV stations in the United States
