= Train Valley =

2015 video game

- Developer: Flazm
- Publishers: Flazm, Blitworks (Console Edition)
- Designer: Alexey Davydov
- Programmer: Sergey Dvoynikov
- Artist: Timofey Shargorodskiy
- Composer: Alexander Ahura
- Engine: Unity
- Platforms: Windows; Linux; macOS; iOS; PlayStation 4; Nintendo Switch; Xbox One
- Release: September 16, 2015: Microsoft Windows, OS X, Linux; WW: September 16, 2015; iOS; WW: December 2, 2016; PlayStation 4, Nintendo Switch, Xbox One; WW: July 27, 2022
- Genres: Puzzle; strategy; train simulator
- Mode: Single-player

Screenshot from a level in Train Valley.

Train Valley is a puzzle-strategy train simulator video game developed by Flazm, released on September 16, 2015. It is available for download on Steam and iOS. A sequel, titled Train Valley 2, was released on March 29, 2018. Train Valley: Console Edition was released on PlayStation 4, Nintendo Switch and Xbox One on July 27, 2022. A third game, titled Train Valley World, was released in 2024. A fourth game, titled Train Valley Origins, was released in 2025.

== Gameplay ==
The player needs to build railways in order to connect cities. Rails are cheap, except when demolishing houses or other objects. In each level, the player must use railway tracks to connect the different stations on the map to transfer materials between stations, having to manage increasing traffic by constructing crossroads and switches. The main objective of each level is to deliver each train to its destination without going bankrupt, but every level also has three advanced objectives, such as "do not stop trains" or "do not destroy tracks". There are 4 chapters in the base game – Europe (in the time period of 1830–1980), America (1840–1960), USSR (1880–1980) and Japan (1900–2020), with a fifth, Germany (1830–2020), as downloadable content (DLC). All chapters have 6 levels, for a total of 24 levels, plus 6 more in the Germany DLC, bringing the total number of levels to 30.

== Development ==
Flazm's first railroad game, called Railway Valley, was developed by Alexey Davydov in 2008, inspired by an older game called Shortline. Four years later, two sequels, Railway Valley 2 and Railway Valley Missions, were released. They were downloaded 15 million times.

Development for Train Valley started in April 2012. At the end of 2013 they showed the game at game conferences and collected user feedback. In November 2014 the game became the winner in the "Family Friendly Game" category at Casual Connect Belgrade. During the Steam Greenlight campaign in August 2014, they got support from over 10,000 players. They then added a new sandbox mode, without money or time limits.

Train Valley entered Steam Early Access on May 7, 2015, and was fully released on September 16, 2015.

== Reception ==
Reception

Aggregate score
| Aggregator | Score |
|---|---|
| Metacritic | PC: 69/100; NS: 79/100; XONE: 80/100 |

Review scores
| Publication | Score |
|---|---|
| GameWatcher | 6/10 |
| Riot Pixels | 60/100 |
| Vandal | 75/100 |

Awards
| Publication | Award |
|---|---|
| Casual Connect 2014 | Best Family Friendly Game |
| Casual Connect 2015 | Best Game Design |
| Indie Prize 2015 | Best Kids and Family Game |

Train Valley was rated Best Family Friendly Game at Casual Connect 2014 and Best Game Design at Casual Connect 2015, and also received an Indie Prize for Best Kids and Family Game. It was also nominated for Best Indie Game and Showcase at DevGAMM 2014.

The game received mixed reviews on Metacritic. Reviewers liked the idea of placing players in different time periods and locations, but found the challenges repetitive. Train Valley was praised for being a game that was easy to learn but hard to master. GameWatcher criticized the game for being repetitive and "without any real ambition", and not making bridges or tunnels available for the player to use when traversing terrain.
