= 2CH (disambiguation) =

2CH can refer to:

- 2CH, a commercial radio station in Sydney, Australia.
- 2C-H or 2,5-dimethoxyphenethylamine
- 2Ch. or Chronicles 2, a Hebrew prose work constituting part of Jewish and Christian scripture
- 2channel or 2ch (2ch.net), a Japanese textboard
- Dvach or 2ch (2ch.hk), a Russian imageboard

== See also ==
- 2chan (disambiguation)
- Channel 2 (disambiguation)
