= Scrap Garden =

2016 video game

- Developer: Flazm
- Publisher: Flazm
- Designers: Egidijus Bachur; Alexey Davydov
- Programmer: Egidijus Bachur
- Artist: Egidijus Bachur
- Composers: Ruslan Archos Nesteruk; A.Voskanian
- Engine: Unity
- Platforms: Windows; macOS; Linux; Xbox One; PlayStation 4; Nintendo Switch
- Release: May 7, 2016
- Genres: Puzzle-platform, adventure
- Mode: Single-player

Scrap Garden is a puzzle-platform adventure video game developed by Flazm and released on May 7, 2016. It was published in 2016 for Steam, PlayStation 4, and Xbox One.

== Gameplay ==
The game is about the adventures of Canny, a lonely robot, who awakens in a post-apocalyptic world to find all other robots shut down and seized up after a dragon destroyed their only power source. The player has to try to bring back power and life to their planet. The world has six unique locations. The play has to fight bosses known as "Titans". Finding hidden collectables in the map unlocks extra content.

== Release ==
Scrap Garden was announced in April 2015 on GamesJamKanobu, where it won 2nd place in the Game Design category and earned a Best Unity Game nomination. Scrap Garden was in Steam Greenlight until its release on May 7, 2016.

== Reception ==
Reception

Aggregate score
Aggregator	Score
Metacritic	58/100

Review scores
Publication	Score
Vandal	5.5/10
Everyeye.it	5/10
Areajugones	6/10
Ragequit.gr	68/100
SpazioGames	5/10
PLAY!	8.5/10
Popoptiq	6.5/10

Awards
Publication	Award
DevGAMM 2015	Best Indie Game
Casual Connect 2015	Best Game Art
GamesJam Kanobu 2015	Best Unity Game

The game received "mixed or average" reviews from critics, according to the review aggregation website Metacritic. Reviewers said that Scrap Garden was a charming 3D platformer with a masterfully constructed storyline, good for spending an afternoon or two on, and its low difficulty and simple gameplay makes it a decent point of entry for children or beginners to the genre. The game was cited as a game with a great idea, but the execution fell flat. It was stated to be an interesting indie project with a nice plot and gameplay, but there were some annoying bugs and boring puzzles. It was also said that Scrap Garden was just like its protagonist: it may look a little dented, but its heart is in the right place.
