= Flazm =

Lithuanian video game developer and publisher

- Industry: Video games
- Founded: 2010; 16 years ago in Magnitogorsk, Russia
- Founders: Alexey Davydov; Sergey Dvoynikov; Timofey Shargorodskiy
- Headquarters: Vilnius, Lithuania
- Number of employees: 9
- Website: flazm.com

Flazm Interactive Entertainment is a Lithuanian video game developer and publisher founded in 2010. It is best known for creating the simulation video games Train Valley and its sequel, Train Valley 2.

== History ==
Flazm Interactive Entertainment was founded in 2010 in Magnitogorsk, Russia, by Alexey Davydov, Sergey Dvoynikov, and Timofey Shargorodskiy. The main focus of the studio was developing web games. Flazm has created over 30 web games for Kizi and Kongregate, which have been played over a billion times.

Flazm's first railroad game, called Railway Valley, was developed by Alexey Davydov in 2008, inspired by an older game called Shortline. Four years later, two sequels – Railway Valley 2 and Railway Valley Missions – were released, and development started for Train Valley.

In 2014, Flazm moved their headquarters to Vilnius, Lithuania. On September 16, 2015, the studio released Train Valley on Steam. Relocating to Lithuania also allowed Flazm to work with Lithuanian developer Egis Bachur on Scrap Garden, which was released in 2016.

On December 23, 2016, Flazm announced that Train Valley 2 was in development. On March 29, 2018, Train Valley 2 entered early access, with the game releasing on April 13, 2019.

== Games ==
Title	Year	Genre	Platforms
Train Valley	2015	Simulation	Windows, macOS, iOS
Scrap Garden	2016	Puzzle-platformer	Windows, macOS
Train Valley 2	2018	Simulation	Windows, macOS
Train Valley World	2024	Simulation	Windows, macOS

=== Web games ===
Title	Website
Bob the Robber	Kongregate
Truck Loader 4	Kongregate
Jim Loves Mary	Kongregate
Headless Zombie	Kongregate
Money Movers	Kongregate
Jim Loves Mary 2	Kongregate
Headless Zombie 2	Kongregate
Money Movers 2	Kongregate
Ruthless Pandas	Kongregate
Money Movers 3	Kizi
Truck Loader 5	Kizi
The Last Survivors	Kizi
Bob the Robber 5 (The temple adventure)	Kizi
Bob the Robber 3	Flazm
Bob the Robber 4 (France, Russia, Japan)	Flazm
Bob the Robber to go	MeowBeast
Bob the Robber 2	MeowBeast

== Game Reviews ==
Daniel Waite at Movies Game and Tech wrote a review of Scrap Garden, "It's a cute story full of interesting characters and humourous [sic] moments, but it's old hat. I could have heard this story in any other game and I'd know what to expect. Even though I wasn't captivated by the storyline, this doesn't mean I disliked the gameplay."
