= National Television of Cambodia =

Government broadcaster of Cambodia

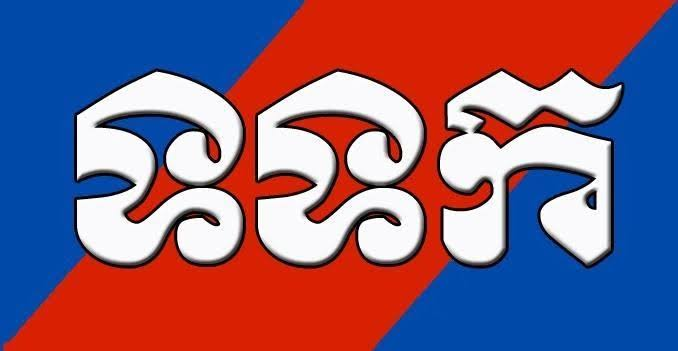
- Country: Cambodia
- Broadcast area: Nationwide and bordering areas near Laos, Vietnam and Thailand

Programming
- Language: Khmer
- Picture format: HDTV (16:9 aspect ratio)

Ownership
- Sister channels: TVK2

History
- Launched: 1961; 65 years ago
- Former names: Télévision royale khmère (TVRK) (1961–1970); Télévision de la République khmère (TVREK) (1970–1975)

Links
- Website: www.tvk.gov.kh

The National Television of Cambodia (TVK; Khmer: ទូរទស្សន៍ជាតិកម្ពុជា, ទទក) is the national television station of Cambodia. It is owned and operated by the government of Cambodia in Phnom Penh together with the national radio station, National Radio of Cambodia (RNK; Khmer: វិទ្យុជាតិកម្ពុជា). TVK is member of the Asia-Pacific Broadcasting Union (ABU).

TVK broadcasts nine hours on weekdays and seventeen hours on weekends. On weekdays it is separated into two sessions, morning session from 11:30 to 14:30, and evening session from 17:00 to 23:00, and on weekends it broadcasts in one section from 6:00 to 23:00. Reruns are also broadcast at night.

== History ==
In 1946 Radio Cambodge opened in Phnom Penh, at the time part of French Indochina (French protectorate of Cambodia), using Japanese equipment. After independence it became Radiodiffusion Nationale Khmère (RNK). With Japanese aid, a TV station was created beginning broadcasting in 1961 for six hours a week, but ended in June 1966 due to technical problems. Regular transmissions began again in November of 1966, using a Japanese transmitter on VHF channel 6, with a power of eight kilowatts and a 200-watt relay.

Subsequent names include Voice/TV Station of the National United Front of Cambodia (1975) and Voice of the Kampuchean People (VOKP, 1979). The civil war during the Pol Pot regime destroyed the transmitters. During the Pol Pot regime, Cambodian television was completely closed down, professional staff were expelled, and other citizens were massacred, for example, technical equipment was completely destroyed. After these events, a production and broadcast center was rebuilt, this time with new equipments, broadcasting on channel 9 in the NTSC-M standard, with a stronger transmitter (40 kilowatts, 800-watt relayer on channel 11 in Bokor). In 1983 a Radio and Television Commission was created. The committee set up Radio Television Cambodge (RTC) for the restored television service. Initially broadcasting three nights a week, by 1986 it broadcast every day, for an average of four to five hours. At the same year, Cambodia switched to color broadcasting. A few years later, Cambodia's first provincial station opened. Both stations had outdated equipment, limited funding and amateur production levels.

In 1994 state TV and radio were placed under the Ministry of Information and separated into different organizations.

== List of stations ==
=== Radio (RNK) ===
==== Central Station (Phnom Penh) ====
- AM Radio: AM 918 kHz (power: 600 kw)
- FM Radio: Wat Phnom FM 105.7 MHz (power: 20 kw)

Both stations carry English and French news at 01:00 pm and 07:00 pm local time.

==== Regional FM Stations ====
Provinces of Cambodia

- 88.1 – Tbong Khmum
- 89.3 – Kampong Speu
- 89.5 – Ratanakiri
- 90.5 – Pailin
- 91.5 – Oddar Meanchey
- 92.3 – Kampong Chhnang
- 92.5 – Kampong Cham
- 92.5 – Takeo
- 92.7 – Battambang
- 93.0 – Sihanoukville
- 94.0 – Banteay Meanchey
- 96.0 – Phnom Penh
- 97.0 – Mondulkiri
- 97.0 – Preah Vihear
- 97.3 – Prey Veng
- 98.3 – Kampong Thom
- 98.5 – Kratie
- 98.5 – Pursat
- 98.7 – Svay Rieng
- 99.0 – Kep
- 99.0 – Stung Treng
- 99.7 – Kampot
- 103.0 – Siem Reap

=== Television (TVK) ===
==== Television Station Network ====
- TVK
- TVK2 (educational; launched on 20 April 2020)

==== Central Station (Phnom Penh) ====
- VHF-Channel 7 (TVK; power: 10 kw)

==== Regional Stations ====
1. Battambang – VHF-Channel 7 (TVK Battambang) from Battambang
2. Koh Kong – VHF-Channel 7 (TVK Koh Kong) from Koh Kong
3. Kratie – VHF-Channel 7 (TVK Kratie) from Kratie
4. Mondulkiri – VHF-Channel 7 (TVK Mondulkiri) from Senmonorom
5. Preah Vihear – VHF-Channel 7 (TVK Preah Vihear) from Tbeng Meanchey
6. Pursat – VHF-Channel 10 (TVK Pursat) from Pursat (national relay)
7. Ratanakiri – VHF-Channel 7 (TVK Ratanakiri) from Banlung
8. Siem Reap – VHF-Channel 12 (TVK Siem Reap) from Siem Reap
9. Sihanoukville – UHF-Channel 53 (TVK Sihanoukville) from Sihanoukville
10. Stung Treng – VHF-Channel 7 (TVK Stung Treng) from Stung Treng

== See also ==
- Media of Cambodia
