= Amarillo College =

Community college in Amarillo, Texas, U.S.

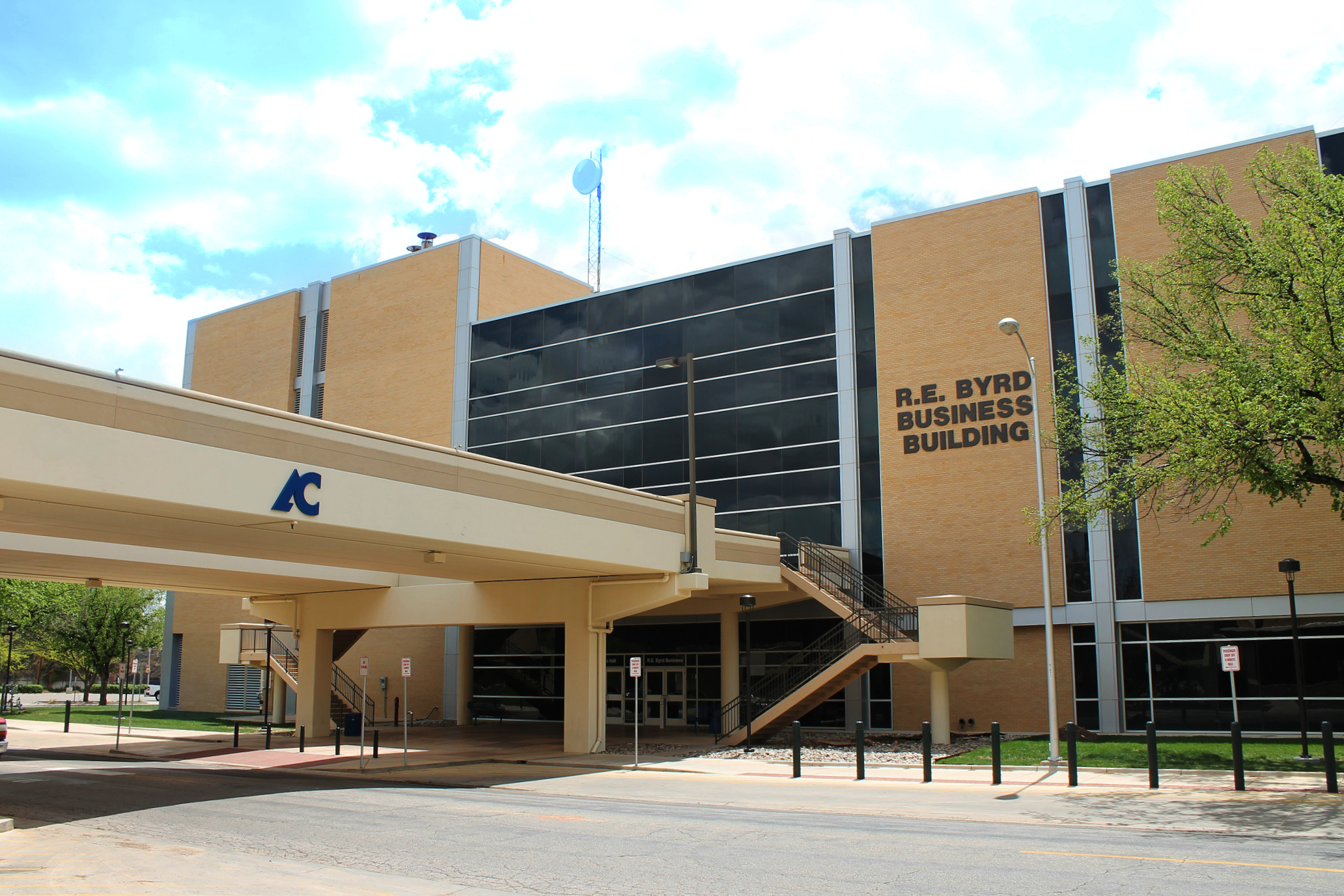
- Motto: Collegium Excellens
- Motto in English: The College of Surpassing
- Type: Public community college
- Established: 1929
- Academic affiliations: Southern Association of Colleges and Schools
- President: Jamelle J. Conner
- Students: 9,102
- Location: Amarillo, Texas, United States; 35.188336°N 101.847089°W
- Campus: Urban, 31 acres (13 ha), Washington Street campus
- Colours: Blue and White
- Mascot: Badger
- Website: www.actx.edu
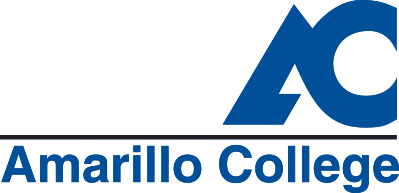

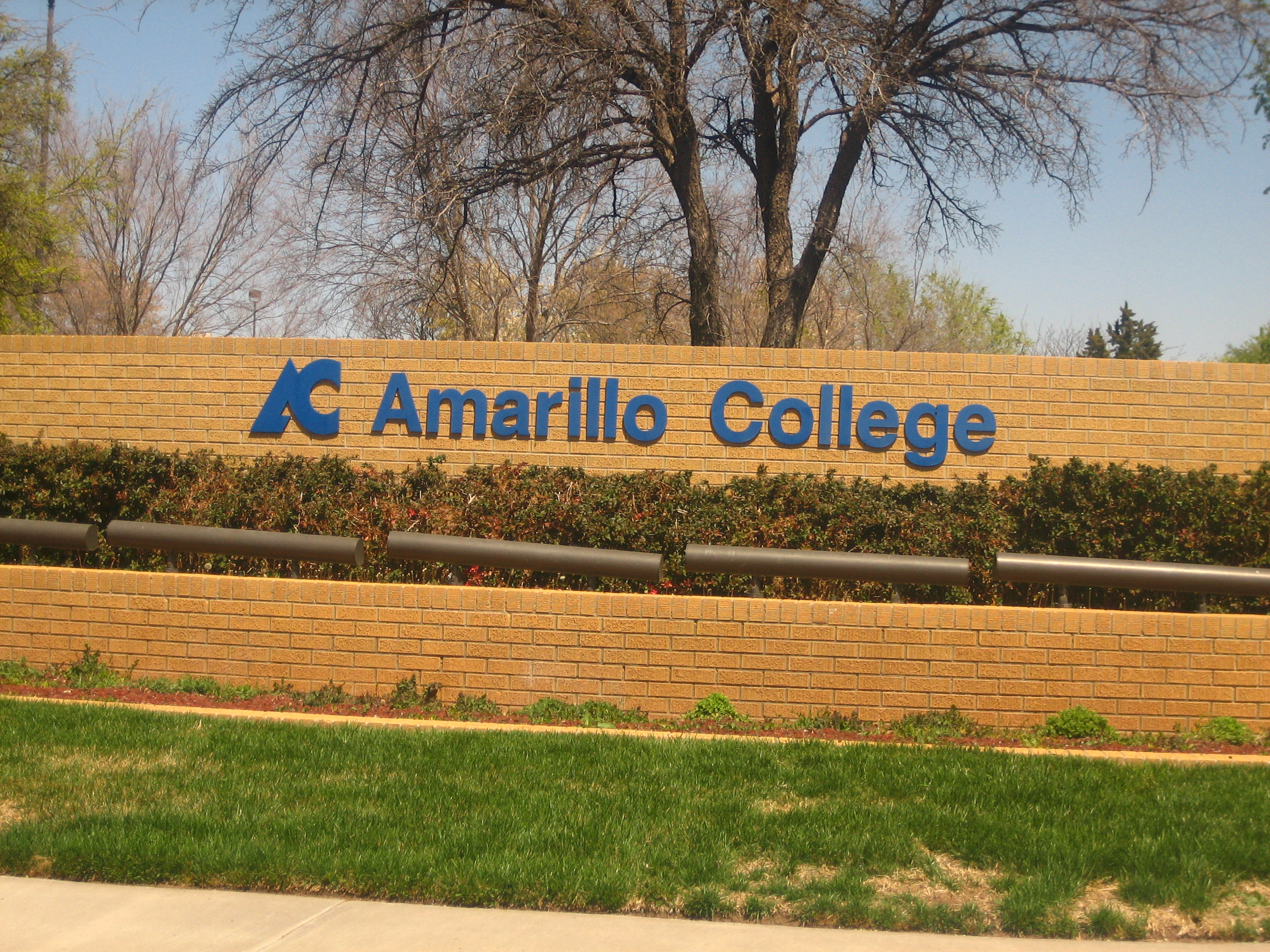

Amarillo College (AC) is a public community college in Amarillo, Texas. It enrolls over 9,100 students and was established in 1929 as Amarillo Junior College. Amarillo College has a total of six campuses as of August 2023.

As defined by the Texas Legislature, the official service area of AC includes all of Carson, Castro, Deaf Smith, Moore, Oldham, Parmer, Potter, Randall, and Swisher Counties.

== History ==
Before 1929 Amarillo was the largest Texas city without a public college. George Ordway and James Guleke helped to introduce a house bill that would establish junior college districts in the Amarillo area. On July 16, 1929, Amarillo College (AC) became the first Texas junior college district to be organized independent of a school district. The first classes were held later that year in September with a total of 86 students in its first class. The college moved to its main campus on Washington Street in 1937 in what is now known as Ordway Hall.

Throughout the first half of the 1940s Amarillo College's Defense School and other classes trained for wartime building efforts. In 1942 the president of the college, Dr. Mead, was commissioned to the Army and forced to take a leave of absence to help in the war.

In 1951 Amarillo College became one of the first three publicly supported Texas college to have racially integrated undergraduate classes, and in 1953 AC had its first African American graduate. The other colleges to admit African Americans at the time were Texas Southmost College in Brownsville and Howard County Junior College in Big Spring.

Amarillo College was the host of a men's basketball team from the 1960s through several years in the 1980s. In 1970, the team was ranked 9th in the nation in pre-season rankings and spent much of the season in the top ten among junior colleges in the nation. The conference included New Mexico JC, Odessa College, Frank Phillips College, New Mexico Military Institute, Howard County College, South Plains College and Clarendon College.

The college also had a men's and women's tennis team as well as a men's golf team in the 1960s and 1970s. In 1971, the AC golf team finished sixth in conference action.

In 1999 the school's fencing team was initiated into the Amarillo College Fencing Association. The program survived the death of Coach Chuck Slaughter in 2016.

The school founded an intercollegiate esports team in 2019, which continues to compete against schools around the country.

In 2022 Amarillo College re-entered intercollegiate sports with a planned schedule of men's baseball, women's softball, and men's and women's cross country. As part of the revived sports program, the school mascot got a makeover, a new costume, and was renamed Ace the Badger.

Amarillo College reached a record enrollment number of over 10,000 students in 2004.

Before winning the Aspen Prize in 2023, Amarillo College was a Top 5 finalist for the Aspen Institute's Aspen Prize for Community College Excellence in 2021 and ultimately was named a 2021 Rising Star. The Aspen Prize is awarded every two years.

== Campuses ==
=== Washington Street Campus ===
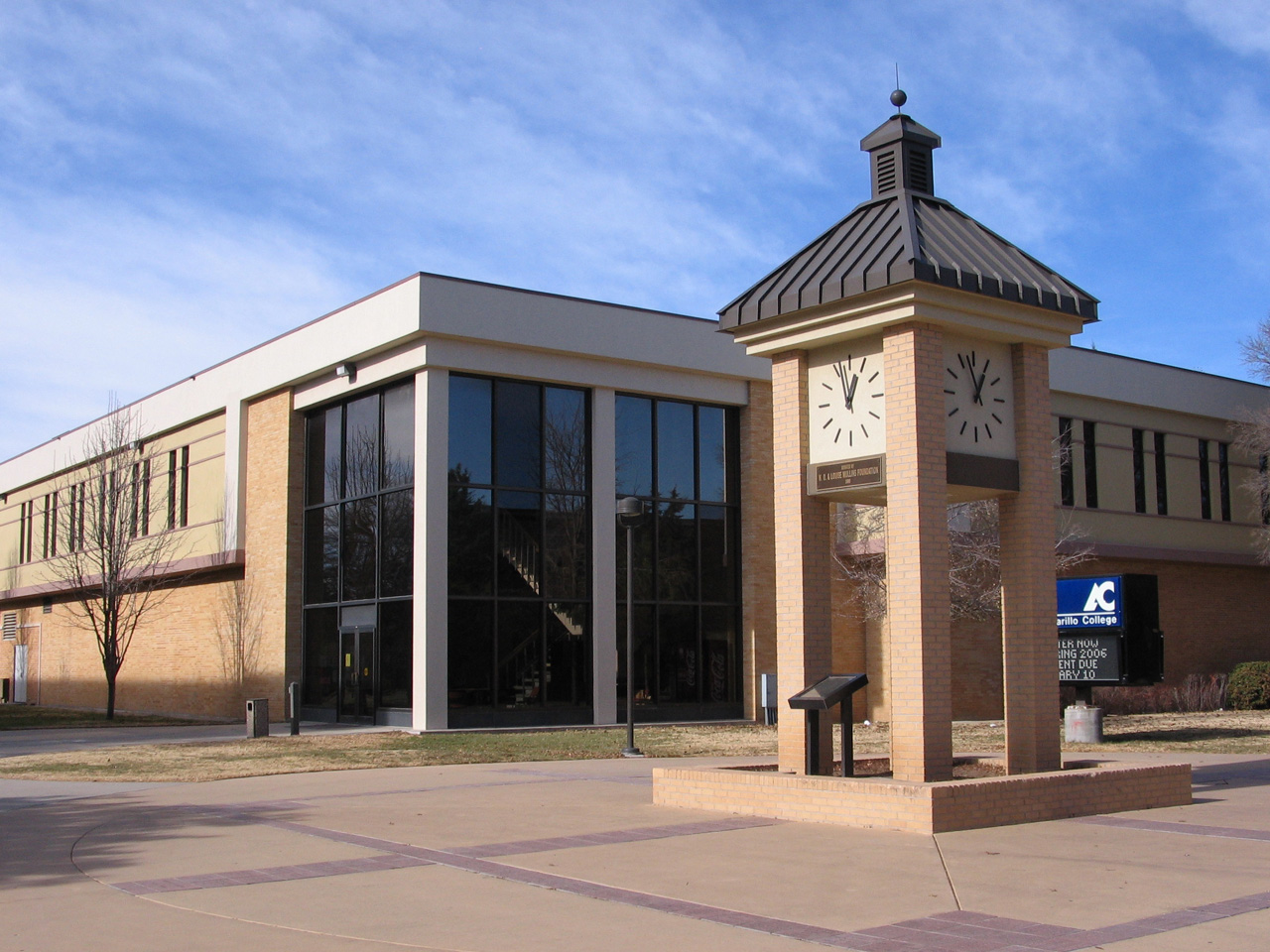
The clock tower at the Amarillo College's Washington Street campus.

The college's main and original campus is located on Washington Street near downtown Amarillo. As of 2005, the campus expands to nearly 31 acres (13 ha) with 17 buildings. It owns radio and television stations, KACV-FM and KACV-TV; both respectively serve as a college/variety radio station and a PBS member public television station and broadcast from the Gilvin Broadcast Center. The Amarillo Museum of Art (AMoA), originally named the Amarillo Art Center, and the National History Museum is also located in this campus. The AMoA opened in 1972 and was renamed in the late 1990s.

The Washington Street campus formerly had a cafeteria but it stopped service after a reduction in the school's budget. It was later replaced by a branch of Palace Coffee in 2018, which in turn was taken over by the school and merged with the student bookstore in a renovated College Union Building in 2020. Food trucks have also occasionally been invited to campus to provide more options for student meals.

=== West Campus ===
The West Campus is a 42-acre lot near Amarillo's hospital district that officially opened its doors in 1967 in response to growing demand for allied health and occupational technology programs. Starting off with only four campus buildings, the campus later expanded to eight buildings after a successful bond election in 1994. The campus houses fifteen allied health programs, including associate degrees in Registered Nursing, Dental Hygiene, Emergency Medical Services Professions (Paramedics and Emergency Medical Technologists) and many others. The West Campus also houses the Panhandle Regional Law Enforcement Academy, an academy accredited by TCLEOSE.

=== Amarillo College Downtown Campus ===
This campus is in the heart of downtown Amarillo. In 1977, Amarillo College leased two gyms from the Amarillo Senior Citizens Association (ASCA), formerly of Amarillo High School and Elizabeth Nixson Junior High School. In 1996, the old Amarillo High School gymnasium was transformed into Business & Industry Center which houses an auditorium, an exhibit hall and classrooms for seminars, short courses and computer training. The facility is also used for workforce training for business industries, and is now home to the Innovation Outpost.

=== East Campus ===
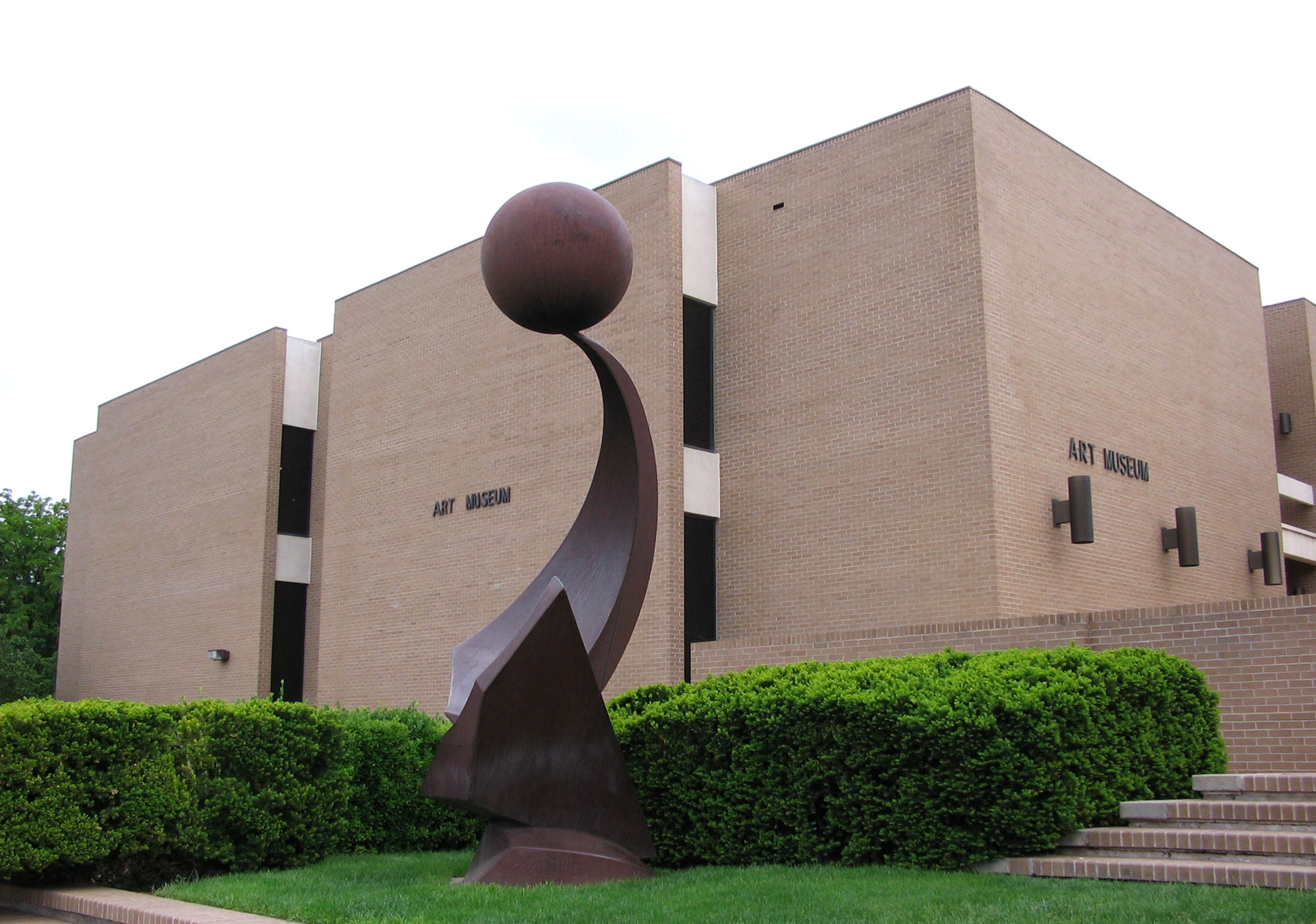
The Amarillo Museum of Art at the Washington Street Campus.

In 1995 the Texas state legislature created Amarillo Technical Center after transferring Texas State Technical College's Amarillo facility to Amarillo College. In 2002, the campus was renamed Amarillo College East Campus.

The campus offers courses in automotive and industrial fields. The campus is also sparsely developed, consisting of old buildings from the TSTC days (which itself were donated when Amarillo Air Force Base closed) and a residential community called Highland Park Village (consisting of old military housing duplexes, from which the nearby school district takes its name), currently managed by the college.

=== Campuses outside Amarillo ===
In 2000 Amarillo College started operating a campus outside Amarillo in Dumas, Texas. The college opened a sixth campus in Hereford, the seat of Deaf Smith County, on August 29, 2005. KPAN AM&FM radio broadcaster Clint Formby raised $89,000 in scholarships for student attending the Hereford campus.

== Demographics ==
A 2017 survey determined that 11% of Amarillo College students were homeless in the period 2016–2017, and a total of 54% of the student body had difficulty obtaining food within one month of taking the survey. As a result of the high numbers of low income students, the school has made antipoverty initiatives.

=== Graduation rates ===
In 2010 the graduation rate was 9%, and focus groups and surveys concluded that poverty-related factors were the causes. The findings kickstarted the school's antipoverty programs. These efforts resulted in significant improvement over the next decade, with rates rising to 31% for the 2021 graduation class

== Notable alumni ==
- Jinh Yu Frey, professional mixed martial artist
- Susan Gibson, songwriter and vocalist
- R. Duane Ireland, professor and former interim dean of Mays Business School at Texas A&M University
- Andrew Kennedy, professional basketball player
- Larry Kenon, professional basketball player
- G. William Miller, former United States Secretary of the Treasury and Chair of the Federal Reserve Bank
- John C. Morgan, Medal of Honor recipient
- Mary Lou Robinson, US federal judge
- Ben Sargent, editorial cartoonist

== See also ==
- Amarillo Museum of Art
