= 2chan =

2chan may refer to:

- 2channel (also 2chan, 2ch or 2ch.net), a defunct Japanese textboard founded by Hiroyuki Nishimura
  - 5channel (or 5ch and 5ch.tunet), its successor owned by American businessman Jim Watkins (also the owner of 8chan)
  - 2ch.sc, a fork of 2channel created and owned by Hiroyuki Nishimura
- Futaba Channel or 2chan (2chan.net), an unrelated Japanese imageboard, based on 2channel

== See also ==
- 2CH (disambiguation)
- Channel 2 (disambiguation)
- Chan (disambiguation), a generic term for imageboards, from the popularity of 4chan and ultimately from Futaba Channel (2chan) and 2channel
