= ASTL-TV3 =

Defunct Tongan television channel

ASTL-TV3 was the second television station in the Kingdom of Tonga (VAP-TV18 was the first), which existed from 1984 to 1996. A subscription television service, later converted to a free-to-air television station upon the arrival of competition, it was broadcast over-the-air on channel 7.

== History ==
Tevita Tupouniua, a Tongan living in the United States, showed a proposal for a cable system to be implemented in Nuku'alofa in early 1982.

The station was founded in August 1983 under the initiative of the Tupouniua brothers and an American company, Clearview International. Clearview was also planning to introduce pay television to Thailand. Broadcasts started in 1984; at the time there were an estimated 300-400 television sets in Nuku'alofa. The success of the station caused it to convert from a free service to a subscription service. In 1986, it had claimed 300 subscribers and broadcast a variety of pre-recorded programs from the United States. The service was priced at T$150 for installation fees and T$15 for a monthly subscription and covered the entirety of the island of Tongatapu. In the same year, ASTL-TV3 was installing a 4-meter receive-only wire-mesh dish capable of picking up signals from satellites receivable in the country as well as the introduction of basic local programming concentrated on local events of community interest.

As of early 1987, the owner and director of the channel demanded 200 subscribers in order to reach the break-even point. In January 1989, the service became entirely scrambled while still maintaining its subscriber base of 300, yet up until the decision was taken, a larger number of viewers was picking up the signals for free. In order to properly receive the channel, a decoder would be used to descramble the pictures. Latu Tupouniua still said that the service was operating at a loss, but still loved the idea of providing a subscription service.

In 1991, after the start of the Oceania Broadcasting Network on channel 7, ASTL-TV3 ceased broadcasting its subscription service and reverted to free-to-air broadcasting, while also beginning to earn revenue from commercial advertising. This led to an increase in revenue and also in manpower. With the 1991 reconversion, a survey conducted that same year showed that the station was being watched by 5,000-6,000 television sets, for a population estimated between 35,000 and 42,000.

As of 1993, ASTL-TV3 broadcast from 7am to 9pm and from 4pm to 11pm Mondays to Saturdays and from 7pm to 10pm on Sundays. Nearly all programs were recorded from TV stations in Hawaii and rebroadcast on videotape. The channel was already carrying a limited number of local programs: sporting events, pageants, church services and advertisements for local companies and businesses. There was some censorship: scenes involving sex were edited out, but scenes involving violence were still allowed. Manpower consisted of ten full-time staff members, three on-air operators, three tape operators, three producers and three who both produced the programs and held administrative positions. The tenth person was the staff member responsible for taping programming from Hawaii.

Although the station had video playback, editing and transmitter facilities, ASTL-TV3 has no TV studio. Outside events were shot on VHS tapes and edited. The tapes of content recorded in Hawaii came in three-quarter-inch U-Matic or half-inch VHS cassettes. The station employed the NTSC color standard for broadcasting. In contrast to OBN, ASTL-TV3 had minimal equipment, but unlike OBN, the station broadcast more contemporary movies and series, prompting the station to have a much larger viewing audience.

ASTL-TV3 wound down operations in 1996 and the Tupouniua brothers left the media industry. Until the launch of Television Tonga in 2000, OBN was the only television service in the country.
