= Channel 2 virtual TV stations in the United States =

The following television stations operate on virtual channel 2 in the United States:

- K02KN-D in Kanarraville, etc., Utah
- K02LJ-D in Nondalton, Alaska
- K02OG-D in Dolores, Colorado
- K02OS-D in Weber Canyon, Colorado
- K02OU-D in Ismay Canyon, Colorado
- K02RA-D in Beaumont, Texas
- K02RJ-D in Kalispell & Lakeside, Montana
- K03EY-D in Parlin, Colorado
- K05EY-D in Terrace Lakes, Idaho
- K05NG-D in Cedar Canyon, Utah
- K06AE-D in Prescott, Arizona
- K06HT-D in Ely, Nevada
- K06MK-D in Elko, Nevada
- K06NS-D in Chiloquin, Oregon
- K06NY-D in Ryndon, Nevada
- K06QN-D in Judith Gap, Montana
- K07HM-D in Big Piney, etc., Wyoming
- K07NR-D in Lakeview, etc., Oregon
- K07ZL-D in Leavenworth, Washington
- K07ZP-D in Bull Lake Valley, Montana
- K07ZT-D in Long Valley Junction, Utah
- K07ZV-D in Sigurd & Salina, Utah
- K07ZW-D in Marysvale, Utah
- K07ZX-D in Woodland & Kamas, Utah
- K07ZZ-D in East Price, Utah
- K07AAA-D in Helper, Utah
- K07AAB-D in Roosevelt, etc., Utah
- K08AY-D in Winthrop-Twisp, Washington
- K08EZ-D in Mink Creek, Idaho
- K08IO-D in Wells, Nevada
- K08JP-D in Dryden, Washington
- K08JV-D in Broadus, Montana
- K08OW-D in Hysham, Montana
- K08PC-D in Hildale, etc. (AZ), Utah
- K08PM-D in Wagner, South Dakota
- K08PN-D in Homer, etc., Alaska
- K08PP-D in Rosebud, etc., Montana
- K08PY-D in Blanding/Monticello, Utah
- K08PZ-D in Corvallis, Oregon
- K08QA-D in Aurora, etc., Utah
- K09CJ-D in Cedar City, Utah
- K09DF-D in Juliaetta, Idaho
- K09DW-D in Ruth, Nevada
- K09EA-D in Ely & McGill, Nevada
- K09MH-D in White Sulphur Spring, Montana
- K09PL-D in Dingle, etc., Idaho
- K09TH-D in Gunnison, Colorado
- K09VL-D in Boyes & Hammond, Montana
- K09XK-D in Sheridan, Wyoming
- K09XY-D in Coolin, Idaho
- K09YR-D in Harlowton, Montana
- K10AH-D in Emigrant, Montana
- K10BD-D in Winthorp-Twisp, Washington
- K10BU-D in Lund & Preston, Nevada
- K10GF-D in Miles City, Montana
- K10GT-D in Mina/Luning, Nevada
- K10IX-D in Newberry Springs, California
- K10MA-D in Waunita Hot Springs, Colorado
- K10NC-D in Kenai, etc., Alaska
- K10RP-D in Santa Clara, Utah
- K11RN-D in Douglas, Wyoming
- K11VY-D in Toquerville, Utah
- K12AV-D in Pateros/Mansfield, Washington
- K12CW-D in Mallott Wakefield, Washington
- K12LX-D in Powderhorn, Colorado
- K12MM-D in Girdwood Valley, Alaska
- K12MW-D in Manhattan, Nevada
- K12OG-D in Taos, New Mexico
- K12RA-D in Colstrip, Montana
- K13KU-D in Delta Junction, Alaska
- K14JY-D in Walker Lake, Nevada
- K14OB-D in Eureka, Nevada
- K14QS-D in Wanship, Utah
- K14QY-D in Rural Sevier County, Utah
- K14RA-D in Teasdale/Torrey, Utah
- K14RC-D in Richfield, etc., Utah
- K14RD-D in Koosharem, Utah
- K14RE-D in Panguitch, Utah
- K14RF-D in Cody, Wyoming
- K14RH-D in Henrieville, Utah
- K14RI-D in Nephi, Utah
- K14RL-D in Samak, Utah
- K14RM-D in Laketown, etc., Utah
- K14RT-D in Fruitland, Utah
- K14SA-D in Wray, Colorado
- K15FD-D in Holyoke, Colorado
- K15FL-D in Park City, Utah
- K15FT-D in Roswell, New Mexico
- K15HE-D in Hatch, Utah
- K15HG-D in Mount Pleasant, Utah
- K15HH-D in Green River, Utah
- K15HJ-D in Ridgecrest, etc., California
- K15IG-D in Deming, New Mexico
- K15KQ-D in Coalville, Utah
- K15KS-D in Garfield, etc., Utah
- K15LB-D in Red Lodge, Montana
- K16CS-D in Pinedale, etc., Wyoming
- K16FD-D in Battle Mountain, Nevada
- K16FS-D in Woody Creek, Colorado
- K16HV-D in Mayfield, Utah
- K16LR-D in Artesia, New Mexico
- K16MA-D in Frost, Minnesota
- K16MY-D in Ashland, Montana
- K16NE-D in Forsyth, Montana
- K17DF-D in Crowley Lake, California
- K17DS-D in Clarendon, Texas
- K17HE-D in Susanville, etc., California
- K17JP-D in Big Timber, etc., Montana
- K17MN-D in Carlsbad, New Mexico
- K17NV-D in Eureka, Nevada
- K18HF-D in Gallup, New Mexico
- K18HH-D in The Dalles, Oregon
- K18JU-D in Utahn, Utah
- K18KA-D in Ely, Nevada
- K18KC-D in Wendover, Utah
- K18MC-D in Enterprise, Utah
- K18MQ-D in Bluff & area, Utah
- K18MR-D in Montezuma Creek-Aneth, Utah
- K19GM-D in Circleville, Utah
- K19HQ-D in Virgin, Utah
- K19IX-D in Romeo, Colorado
- K19JO-D in Harlowton, etc., Montana
- K19KQ-D in Orderville, Utah
- K19LC-D in Pagosa Springs, Colorado
- K19LD-D in Bayfield, Colorado
- K19MA-D in Leamington, Utah
- K19MM-D in Ruth, Nevada
- K20GQ-D in Las Vegas, New Mexico
- K20KB-D in Huntington, Utah
- K20LT-D in Diamond Basic, etc., Wyoming
- K20ND-D in Summit County, Utah
- K20NL-D in Grays River/Lebam, Washington
- K20NZ-D in Garden Valley, Idaho
- K20OD-D in Valmy, Nevada
- K21CC-D in Lewiston, Idaho
- K21EF-D in Pitkin, Colorado
- K21IR-D in Childress, Texas
- K21JU-D in Meeteetse, Wyoming
- K21OS-D in Beowawe, Nevada
- K22CI-D in Lander, Wyoming
- K22FS-D in Beaver, etc., Utah
- K22IE-D in Navajo Mtn. Sch., etc., Utah
- K22IF-D in Oljeto, Utah
- K22IG-D in Mexican Hat, Utah
- K22JY-D in Truth or Consequences, New Mexico
- K22JZ-D in Spring Glen, Utah
- K22MY-D in Jackson, Minnesota
- K22NC-D in Scipio/Holden, Utah
- K22NN-D in Forsyth, Montana
- K22NU-D in Golconda, Nevada
- K22OI-D in Carbondale, Colorado
- K23KL-D in Farmington, New Mexico
- K23NS-D in Rockaway Beach, Oregon
- K23OE-D in Kasilof, Alaska
- K23OX-D in Holyoke, Colorado
- K24FF-D in Lovelock, Nevada
- K24GD-D in Hardin, Montana
- K24KR-D in Jacks Cabin, Colorado
- K24LS-D in Lucerne Valley, California
- K24MY-D in Kanarraville, Utah
- K25DI-D in Silver City, New Mexico
- K25FR-D in Elko, Nevada
- K25IX-D in Huntsville, etc., Utah
- K25KR-D in Round Mountain, Nevada
- K26CS-D in St. James, Minnesota
- K26DB-D in Astoria, Oregon
- K26GL-D in Columbus, Montana
- K26LW-D in Sheridan, Wyoming
- K26NV-D in Fishlake Resort, Utah
- K26NX-D in Madras, Oregon
- K26NY-D in Kanab, Utah
- K26OM-D in Shoshoni, Wyoming
- K27AI-D in Ninilchik, etc., Alaska
- K27GB-D in Beryl/Modena/New C, Utah
- K27GL-D in Hobbs, New Mexico
- K27HP-D in Alamogordo, New Mexico
- K27MX-D in Baker Valley, Oregon
- K27ND-D in Aztec, New Mexico
- K27OF-D in Crested Butte, Colorado
- K27ON-D in Lucerne Valley, California
- K28FT-D in Milton-Freewater, Oregon
- K28JN-D in Manti, etc., Utah
- K28LG-D in Bridger, etc., Montana
- K28OK-D in Hanksville, Utah
- K28OM-D in Escalante, Utah
- K28ON-D in Castle Rock, etc., Montana
- K28PB-D in McDermitt, Nevada
- K28PS-D in Ruidoso, New Mexico
- K28QA-D in Sapinero, Colorado
- K29BN-D in Silver Springs, etc., Nevada
- K29IE-D in St. James, Minnesota
- K29KJ-D in Orovada, Nevada
- K29LB-D in Vernal, etc., Utah
- K29LQ-D in Polson, Montana
- K29MG-D in Hawthorne, Nevada
- K29NH-D in Lund & Preston, Nevada
- K30FO-D in Peetz, Colorado
- K30GO-D in Pleasant Valley, Colorado
- K30JB-D in Morgan, etc., Utah
- K30KK-D in Fountain Green, Utah
- K30LF-D in Duchesne, Utah
- K30LY-D in Manila, etc., Utah
- K30ON-D in Capitol Reef National Park, Utah
- K30OO-D in Caineville, Utah
- K30OQ-D in Fremont, Utah
- K30OT-D in Tropic/Cannonville, Utah
- K30OU-D in Cody, etc., Wyoming
- K30QA-D in Coeur d'Alene, Idaho
- K31CI-D in Montpelier, Idaho
- K31DR-D in Caballo, New Mexico
- K31FZ-D in Haxtun, Colorado
- K31JB-D in Hanna, etc., Utah
- K31JF-D in Boulder, Utah
- K31JL-D in Vernal, etc., Utah
- K31JN-D in Scofield, Utah
- K31JX-D in Rockville, Utah
- K31KS-D in Lechee, etc., Arizona
- K31MC-D in Spring Glen, etc., Utah
- K31NB-D in Santa Fe, New Mexico
- K31NP-D in Rural Garfield County, Utah
- K31NZ-D in Eagle Nest, New Mexico
- K31OD-D in Henefer, etc., Utah
- K31OJ-D in Delta, etc., Utah
- K31OK-D in Beaver, etc., Utah
- K32AB-D in Yuma, Colorado
- K32AG-D in Parowan/Enoch, etc., Utah
- K32CJ-D in Ely, Nevada
- K32LY-D in La Grande, Oregon
- K32LZ-D in Alton, Utah
- K32NK-D in Lincoln City, etc., Oregon
- K32OA-D in Coolin, Idaho
- K33DS-D in Freedom-Etna, Wyoming
- K33ER-D in Verdi/Mogul, Nevada
- K33JG-D in Peoa/Oakley, Utah
- K34DI-D in Pendleton, Oregon
- K34KO-D in Tulia, Texas
- K34KP-D in Clear Creek, Utah
- K34LE-D in Shurz, Nevada
- K34OI-D in Logan, Utah
- K34PJ-D in Tillamook, Oregon
- K34PL-D in Livingston, etc., Montana
- K34PT-D in Julesburg, Colorado
- K34PU-D in Crested Butte, Colorado
- K35CV-D in Shoshoni, Wyoming
- K35EM-D in Quitaque, Texas
- K35EW-D in Heber/Midway, Utah
- K35GA-D in La Grande, Oregon
- K35IC-D in Bonners Ferry, Idaho
- K35LD-D in Prineville, Oregon
- K35LJ-D in Crested Butte, Colorado
- K35NB-D in Polson, Montana
- K35NJ-D in Antimony, Utah
- K35NN-D in Randolph & Woodruff, Utah
- K35PL-D in Roundup, Montana
- K36HA-D in Elko, Nevada
- K36IB-D in Midland, etc., Oregon
- K36IC-D in Golconda, etc., Nevada
- K36IF-D in Orangeville, Utah
- K36IR-D in Garrison, etc., Utah
- K36KI-D in Fillmore, etc., Utah
- K36PC-D in Emery, Utah
- K36PD-D in Green River, Utah
- K36PF-D in Ferron, Utah
- K36PH-D in Methow, Washington
- K36PJ-D in Howard, Montana
- K36PO-D in Winnemucca, Nevada
- KACV-TV in Amarillo, Texas
- KASA-TV in Santa Fe, New Mexico
- KATN in Fairbanks, Alaska
- KATU in Portland, Oregon
- KBOI-TV in Boise, Idaho
- KCBS-TV in Los Angeles, California
- KCWQ-LD in Palm Springs, California
- KCWX in Fredericksburg, Texas
- KDKA-TV in Pittsburgh, Pennsylvania
- KDTN in Denton, Texas
- KETS in Little Rock, Arkansas
- KGAN in Cedar Rapids, Iowa
- KGFE in Grand Forks, North Dakota
- KHON-TV in Honolulu, Hawaii
- KJRH-TV in Tulsa, Oklahoma
- KMID in Midland, Texas
- KMYU in St. George, Utah
- KNAZ-TV in Flagstaff, Arizona
- KNCD-LD in Nacogdoches, Texas
- KNOP-TV in North Platte, Nebraska
- KOTI in Klamath Falls, Oregon
- KPRC-TV in Houston, Texas
- KQTV in St. Joseph, Missouri
- KREM in Spokane, Washington
- KSNC in Great Bend, Kansas
- KTCA-TV in St. Paul, Minnesota
- KTCI-TV in St. Paul, Minnesota
- KTUU-TV in Anchorage, Alaska
- KTVI in St. Louis, Missouri
- KTVN in Reno, Nevada
- KTVQ in Billings, Montana
- KTVU in Oakland, California
- KTWO-TV in Casper, Wyoming
- KUNW-CD in Yakima, Washington
- KUSD-TV in Vermillion, South Dakota
- KUTV in Salt Lake City, Utah
- KWGN-TV in Denver, Colorado
- KXMA-TV in Dickinson, North Dakota
- KXZQ-LD in Durango, Colorado
- W09AT-D in Fajardo, Puerto Rico
- W28EH-D in Adjuntas, Puerto Rico
- W28EQ-D in Utuado, Puerto Rico
- WBAY-TV in Green Bay, Wisconsin
- WBBM-TV in Chicago, Illinois
- WBRZ-TV in Baton Rouge, Louisiana
- WCBD-TV in Charleston, South Carolina
- WCBS-TV in New York, New York
- WDIQ in Dozier, Alabama
- WDPN-TV in Wilmington, Delaware
- WDTN in Dayton, Ohio
- WESH in Daytona Beach, Florida
- WETP-TV in Sneedville, Tennessee
- WFMY-TV in Greensboro, North Carolina
- WGBH-TV in Boston, Massachusetts
- WGCI-LD in Skowhegan, Maine
- WGRZ in Buffalo, New York
- WHNH-CD in Manchester, etc., Vermont
- WJBK in Detroit, Michigan
- WKAQ-TV in San Juan, Puerto Rico
- WKRN-TV in Nashville, Tennessee
- WKTV in Utica, New York
- WLBZ in Bangor, Maine
- WLMO-LD in Fort Wayne, Indiana
- WMAB-TV in Mississippi State, Mississippi
- WMAR-TV in Baltimore, Maryland
- WMBP-LD in Mobile, Alabama
- WPBT in Miami, Florida
- WSB-TV in Atlanta, Georgia
- WTWO in Terre Haute, Indiana
- WUND-TV in Edenton, North Carolina
- WUVF-LD in Naples, Florida

The following stations, which are no longer licensed, formerly operated on virtual channel 2:

- K02KZ-D in Kobuk, Alaska
- K04DS-D in Kenai River, Alaska
- K05ET-D in Likely, California
- K08BG-D in Troy, Montana
- K10KB-D in Austin, Nevada
- K21LV-D in Perryton, Texas
- K23EC-D in Canadian, Texas
- K30IV-D in Wallowa, Oregon
- K35DK-D in Granite Falls, Minnesota
- K36KL-D in Gruver, Texas
- K40JV-D in Stateline, etc., California
- K44AK-D in Memphis, Texas
- K44HA-D in Preston, Idaho
- K44LL-D in Austin, Nevada
- K45KT-D in Sargents, Colorado
- K47BP-D in Follett, Texas
- K47GM-D in New Mobeetie, Texas
- KITM-LD in Lahaina, Hawaii
