= KACV-TV =

Television station in Amarillo, Texas

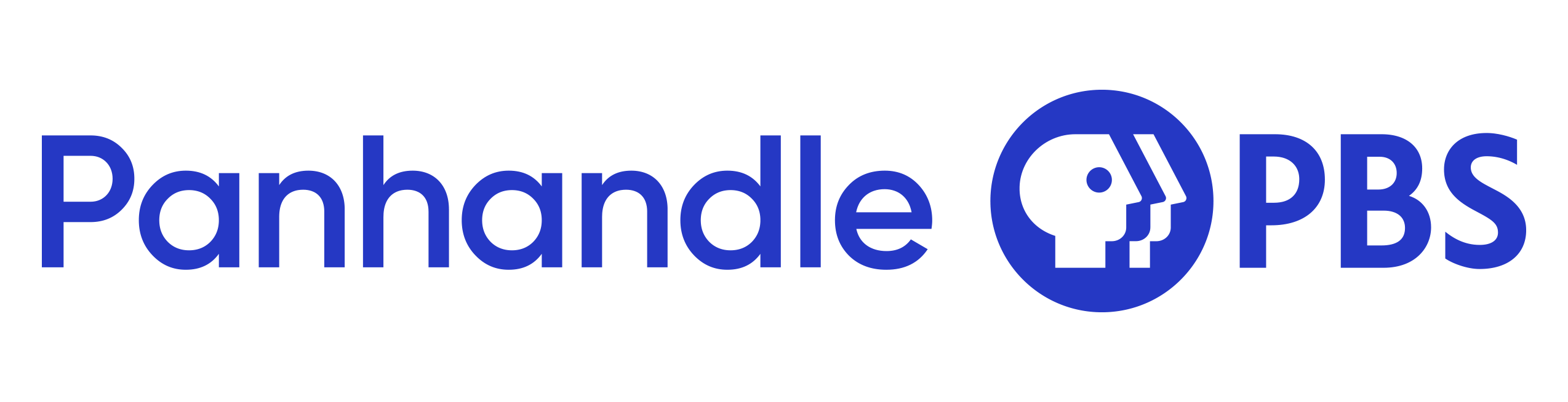
- Amarillo, Texas; United States
- Channels: Digital: 9 (VHF); Virtual: 2
- Branding: Panhandle PBS

Programming
- Affiliations: 2.1: PBS; 2.2: PBS Kids; 2.3: Create

Ownership
- Owner: Amarillo College; (Amarillo Junior College District)
- Sister stations: Radio: KACV-FM

History
- First air date: August 29, 1988
- Former channel numbers: Analog: 2 (VHF, 1988–2009); Digital: 8 (VHF, 2002–2009)
- Call sign meaning: Amarillo College Voice

Technical information
- Licensing authority: FCC
- Facility ID: 1236
- ERP: 30 kW
- HAAT: 398 m (1,306 ft)
- Transmitter coordinates: 35°22′29.7″N 101°52′57.3″W
- Translator(s): see § Translators

Links
- Public license information: Public file; LMS
- Website: www.panhandlepbs.org

KACV-TV (channel 2), branded Panhandle PBS, is a PBS member television station in Amarillo, Texas, United States. It is owned by Amarillo College alongside student-operated radio station KACV-FM (89.9). The two outlets share studios at the Gilvin Broadcast Center on Amarillo College's Washington Street campus (near the intersection of Southwest 24th Avenue and South Jackson Streets); KACV-TV's transmitter is located west of US 87–287 in unincorporated Potter County.

== History ==
Previous KACV-TV logo, used from 1999 to 2008.

In 1955, the Amarillo Junior College District began producing televised instructional programs for carriage on local commercial television stations in the area to be viewed in school by local college and secondary school students. At its peak, the district was leasing airtime to broadcast 40 hours of instructional programming Monday through Friday each week. The college established its own academic department for radio and television production in 1971, and eventually broadcast Amarillo Badgers college basketball games and other local programs. In 1982, Amarillo College eventually launched a local educational access cable channel on channel 2 on most Amarillo-area cable systems.

After National Educational Television (NET) had many of its functions superseded and assumed by the Public Broadcasting Service (PBS) in 1970, PBS had maintained an arrangement to distribute its programming to the Texas Panhandle – which was one of the few areas of the state (and the United States, as a whole) that did not have a PBS member station of its own – on a per-program basis via the Amarillo market's commercial stations, NBC affiliate KAMR-TV (channel 4), ABC affiliate KVII-TV (channel 7) or CBS affiliate KFDA-TV (channel 10). (Among them, the popular children's program Sesame Street, which was carried locally via KVII-TV).

Viewers in the Texas Panhandle watched PBS programming via cable television via either KTXT (now KTTZ-TV) in Lubbock (in the southern Panhandle) or via a translator of KRMA-TV in Denver. PBS programming was also available over the air via KWET in Cheyenne, Oklahoma (a transmitter of the Oklahoma Educational Television Authority [OETA], which reaches the eastern portion of the Amarillo market), or via KENW out of Portales, New Mexico.

The VHF channel 2 allocation in Amarillo was contested between two groups that competed for the Federal Communications Commission (FCC)'s approval of a construction permit to build and license to operate a new television station. Amarillo Junior College District filed the initial application on December 19, 1984. The district underwent an FCC licensure tug-of-war with Family Media, Inc., another group seeking to operate a non-commercial station on channel 2. The FCC granted the Amarillo Junior College District a construction permit and license in 1986. The following year (1987), Amarillo College received a $1 million grant from the United States Department of Commerce to purchase broadcast equipment; the college concurrently raised about $550,000 in funds from the public and local private contributions, enabling the expansion of its studio facilities.

The station first signed on the air on August 29, 1988. It was the first public television station in the Texas Panhandle, making Amarillo one of the last major media markets in Texas to get its own PBS station. Despite the station's presence, cable providers in portions of the Panhandle continue to carry PBS programming via the OETA—which, in addition to its Cheyenne transmitter, also maintains three translators across the state line in the Oklahoma Panhandle—instead of KACV in some areas of the eastern Texas Panhandle.

On September 3, 2013, in commemoration of the station's 25th anniversary of broadcasting, KACV changed its branding to "Panhandle PBS" (removing references to its over-the-air virtual channel).

== Programming ==
As a PBS member station, much of KACV-TV's programming consists of educational, children's and entertainment programming distributed by PBS to its member stations as well as content from American Public Television and various other distributors. The station's programming schedule also consists of cultural and educational programs, documentaries and general interest programming. While there is some cross-promotion between KACV-TV and KACV-FM, the two properties conduct fundraising campaigns independent of one another. The station has also produced some local programming including artZONE, and the documentaries A Conversation with Ken Burns and Braggin' Rights: The Coors Cowboy Club Ranch Rodeo.

KACV's weekday lineup is mostly filled by children's programs from PBS and American Public Television (such as Arthur, Curious George, Wild Kratts, Odd Squad and Sesame Street) from 5:30 a.m. to 5:30 p.m. Programs provided by PBS are primarily shown on most nights in prime time except for Saturdays, which instead features a mix of music, documentary and British drama content from American Public Television. Weekends feature additional children's programming in the morning (from 5 to 8:30 a.m. on Saturdays and from 5 a.m. to noon on Sundays), with the remainder of the schedule outside of prime time consisting of travel, cooking and how-to series on Saturdays, and art instruction, British sitcoms, encores of PBS prime time shows and some local programs.

From the station's sign-on until January 2009, the station's broadcast transmitter was typically turned off during the overnight hours (generally from noon to 5 a.m.). In order to fill time until the station resumed broadcasts each morning, from 1995 to 2008, Amarillo-area cable providers carried the PBS Satellite Service over KACV's assigned channel slots during the designated sign-off-to-sign-on period. (Until the station adopted such a schedule in January 2009, KACV was one of the few remaining broadcast television outlets in the United States that had not converted to a 24-hour-a-day schedule.) Beforehand, many other cable providers around the Amarillo market carried other lower-priority cable networks that limited headend frequency space precluded from assigning them to a separate full-time channel over KACV's channel slots as filler during overnight/early morning time periods during the broadcast signal's off-air period.

== Technical information ==
=== Subchannels ===
The station's signal is multiplexed:

Subchannels of KACV-TV
Channel	Res.	Short name	Programming
2.1	1080i	KACV-HD	PBS
2.2	480i	KACVSD1	PBS Kids
2.3	480i	KACVSD2	Create

=== Analog-to-digital conversion ===
KACV began transmitting a digital television signal on VHF channel 8 in 2002. The station shut down its analog signal, over VHF channel 2, on February 17, 2009, the original target date on which full-power television stations in the United States were to transition from analog to digital broadcasts under federal mandate (which Congress later pushed back to June 12, 2009, by resolution three weeks before all full-power stations were scheduled to transition). The station's digital signal remained on its pre-transition VHF channel 8, using virtual channel 2.

=== Translators ===
In addition to maintaining cable carriage within this area, KACV-TV covers a large portion of the Texas Panhandle through a network of UHF translators that distribute its programming beyond the 67.6-mile-wide (108.8 km) range corridor of its broadcast signal.

- Childress: K21IR-D
- Clarendon: K17DS-D
- Perryton: K36MA-D
- Quitaque: K35EM-D
- Tulia: K34KO-D

== See also ==
- Channel 9 digital TV stations in the United States
- Channel 2 virtual TV stations in the United States
