= Channel 2 low-power TV stations in the United States =

The following low-power television stations broadcast on digital or analog channel 2 in the United States:

- K02AO-D in Eureka, Montana
- K02EE-D in Weaverville, California
- K02EG-D in Ursine, Nevada
- K02IK-D in Gateview, Colorado
- K02JG-D in Prospect, Oregon
- K02JJ-D in Williams, Oregon
- K02JO-D in Caliente, Nevada
- K02KN-D in Kanarraville, etc., Utah
- K02LH-D in Clarks Fork, Wyoming
- K02LJ-D in Nondalton, Alaska
- K02NV-D in Sargents, Colorado
- K02OD-D in Shelter Cove, California
- K02OG-D in Dolores, Colorado
- K02OS-D in Weber Canyon, Colorado
- K02OU-D in Ismay Canyon, Colorado
- K02QI-D in Hesperus, Colorado
- K02QP-D in Chowchilla, California
- K02QW-D in Reno, Nevada
- K02RA-D in Beaumont, Texas
- K02RI-D in Cedar City Canyon, Utah
- K02RJ-D in Kalispell & Lakeside, Montana
- K02RL-D in Indio, California
- K15JZ-D in Applegate Valley, Oregon
- K18LJ-D in Dunsmuir, etc., California
- KBFY-LD in Fortuna, Arizona
- KBRO-LD in Lyons, Colorado, an ATSC 3.0 station
- KCPM-LP in Fargo, North Dakota
- KFTY-LD in Middletown, California
- KHIZ-LD in Los Angeles, California
- KLNK-LD in Groveton, Texas
- KQRO-LD in Morgan Hill, California
- KSFW-LD in Dallas, Texas
- KTNR-LD in Laredo, Texas
- W02CS-D in Ponce, Puerto Rico
- W02CT-D in Arecibo, Puerto Rico
- W02CY-D in New York, New York
- WASA-LD in Port Jervis, New York, uses WKOB-LD's spectrum, to move to channel 13
- WHNH-CD in Manchester, etc., Vermont
- WKWT-LD in Key West, Florida
- WLMO-LD in Fort Wayne, Indiana
- WRIW-CD in Providence, Rhode Island, uses WSBE-TV's full-power spectrum
- WUVM-LD in Atlanta, Georgia

The following low-power stations, which are no longer licensed, formerly broadcast on analog or digital channel 2:

- K02AW in Virgin, Utah
- K02BU in Green River, Utah
- K02EQ in Paris, Texas
- K02ET in Vallecito, Colorado
- K02FA in Antimony, Utah
- K02FF in Lakehead, California
- K02FQ in Escalante, Utah
- K02FT in Gold Hill, Oregon
- K02FZ in Winthrop, Washington
- K02GE in La Barge, Wyoming
- K02GL in Dorena, etc., Oregon
- K02HH in Parker, Arizona
- K02HO in Unalaska, etc., Alaska
- K02HY in Ridgecrest, etc., California
- K02IB in Homer, etc., Alaska
- K02ID in Yakutat, Alaska
- K02IQ in Squaw Valley, etc., Oregon
- K02JE in McGrath, Alaska
- K02JH in Salida, etc., Colorado
- K02JI in Angoon, Alaska
- K02JU in Selawik, Alaska
- K02JX in Bridgeport, etc., California
- K02KB in Allakaket, Alaska
- K02KK in Cantwell, Alaska
- K02KS in Ryndon, etc., Nevada
- K02KX in Chevak, Alaska
- K02KZ-D in Kobuk, Alaska
- K02LA in Red Devil, Alaska
- K02LW in Gustavus, Alaska
- K02ME in Womens Bay, Alaska
- K02MN in Levelock, Alaska
- K02NU in Cedar City, etc., Utah
- K02OI in Montezuma Creek-Aneth, Utah
- K02OK in Beowawe, etc., Nevada
- K02OP in Collbran, Colorado
- K02OT in East Price, Utah
- K02PJ in La Grande, Oregon
- K02PU in Bluff & area, Utah
- K02QB in Alexandria, Louisiana
- K02QM-D in Lemon, etc., Alaska
- K02RM-D in Wendover, Nevada
- KCWQ-LP in Palm Springs, California
- KFAK-LD in Boise, Idaho
- KITM-LD in Lahaina, Hawaii
- KYAN-LD in Los Angeles, California
- W02AU-D in St. Francis, Maine
- W02CF in Minocqua, Wisconsin
- WESL-LP in Jamestown, Kentucky
- WUVF-LP in Naples, Florida
