= Channel 2 virtual TV stations in Canada =

The following television stations operate on virtual channel 2 in Canada:

- CBFT-DT in Montreal, Quebec
- CBUT-DT in Vancouver, British Columbia
- CFAP-DT in Quebec City, Quebec
- CFGC-DT-2 in North Bay, Ontario
- CHBC-DT in Kelowna, British Columbia
- CICT-DT in Calgary, Alberta
- CJBR-DT in Rimouski, Quebec
- CKAL-DT-1 in Lethbridge, Alberta
- CKCK-DT in Regina, Saskatchewan
- CKCW-DT in Moncton, New Brunswick
- CKPR-DT in Thunder Bay, Ontario
- CKRT-DT-1 in Baie-Saint-Paul, Quebec
- CKRT-DT-2 in Dégelis, Quebec
- CKSA-DT in Lloydminster, Alberta/Saskatchewan
