= Tonfön =

Tongan telecommunications company

- Type: Private
- Industry: Communications services
- Founded: 2002
- Headquarters: Nukuʻalofa, Tonga,
- Products: ISP, phone cards, Tonfön Television

Tonfön was a Tongan telecommunications company, founded in 2002 by its chairman, Crown Prince Tupoutoʻa (later King George Tupou V). It operates as a division of the Shoreline Group of Companies. The umlaut on the second 'o' is not pronounced, but is purely for effect.

Tonfön is one of Tonga's two major telecommunications providers (the other being TCC), offering phone, internet and television services.

The company relies on profit from the sale of phone cards, SIM cards, mobile, home phone & internet access packages, and the sale of TV set-top boxes enabling subscriber access to seven 24-hour pay-TV channels on Tonfön Television.

On 16 November 2006, the Shoreline/Tonfön offices located in the Nukuʻalofa suburb of Mailetaha were trashed and burned to the ground by rioting pro-democracy protesters. Six people, presumed to be rioters, died in the blaze. On 28 November 2007, it was announced that the Digicel Group was going to acquire Tonfön, as part of its rollout in the Pacific region. On 8 May 2008, the Tonfön branding had phased out.
