= Television Tonga 2 =

Tongan television channel

- Country: Tonga

Ownership
- Owner: Government of Tonga (privately operated by Tonga Broadcasting Commission)
- Sister channels: Television Tonga

History
- Founded: 4 July 2008; 17 years ago
- Launched: 4 July 2008; 17 years ago

Television Tonga 2 is a Tongan television channel operated by the Tonga Broadcasting Commission. It was launched on 4 July 2008. Until 2016, when the analog service switched off, it broadcast on the VHF band.

The channel's programmes include sports, films, "other foreign programmes" and a six-hour programme from China Central Television.

== See also ==
- Television Tonga
- Tonga Broadcasting Commission
