= ZDF 2 =

Defunct German television channel

- Country: West Germany
- Broadcast area: West Germany
- Headquarters: Mainz, Germany

Programming
- Language: German

History
- Launched: 1 January 1984
- Closed: 30 November 1984 (334 days)
- Replaced by: 3sat

Links
- Website: www.zdf.de

ZDF 2 was the name of a TV channel operated by the ZDF, which was broadcast from 1 January 1984 to 30 November 1984 within the framework of a cable pilot project (Kabelpilotprojekt). The station broadcast parts of the ZDF main program time-delayed under the motto Zeitalternatives Fernsehen, partly also broadcast from the same day before the broadcast in the regular ZDF program. In addition, broadcasts of the First Private Television Company (Erste Private Fernsehgesellschaft/EPF), a subsidiary of the regional newspaper Die Rheinpfalz and German newspaper publishers, were broadcast on the channel. In this context, EPF offered broadcasts with informative, regional, popular and entertaining content.

The channel was distributed at the cable pilot project (Kabelpilotprojekt) in Ludwigshafen am Rhein on channel 13 as of January 1, 1984 and in the cable network of Munich from April 1984.

ZDF 2 stopped its broadcasting service already 11 months after the start in favor of the broadcaster 3sat, which was co-organized by ZDF, ORF and SRG and can be described as the successor channel of ZDF 2. It broadcast documentaries.
