= Highland Park Independent School District (Potter County, Texas) =

School district in Amarillo, Texas

Coordinates: 35.365°N 101.682°W

Location
- 15300 Amarillo Blvd. East; Amarillo, TX 79108 ESC Region 16 USA

District information
- Type: Public
- Motto: Expect Exemplary
- Grades: Pre-K through 12
- Established: 1979
- Superintendent: Jimmy Hannon
- Schools: 3
- NCES District ID: 4835560

Students and staff
- Students: 826
- Teachers: 65
- Student–teacher ratio: 12.74
- Athletic conference: UIL Class AA
- Colors: green and gold

Other information
- Mascot: Hornet
- Website: Highland Park ISD

Highland Park Independent School District is a public school district based in Amarillo, Texas (USA). It has 3 schools, Highland Park Elementary School, Highland Park Middle School, and Highland Park High school. All of these are located on the same campus. As a whole, the district serves 826 students.

The district covers all of eastern Potter County, including those portions of Amarillo generally east of Whitaker Road (this includes all of the land surrounding Rick Husband Amarillo International Airport and the east campus of Amarillo College including a former military housing community called Highland Park Village from which the district got its name). The district operated as a K-9 school for several years, but did not become an independent district until 1979 and did not expand to K-12 until the 1985-1986 school year.

In 2009, the school district was rated "recognized" by the Texas Education Agency.
