= TVK2 =

Cambodian television channel

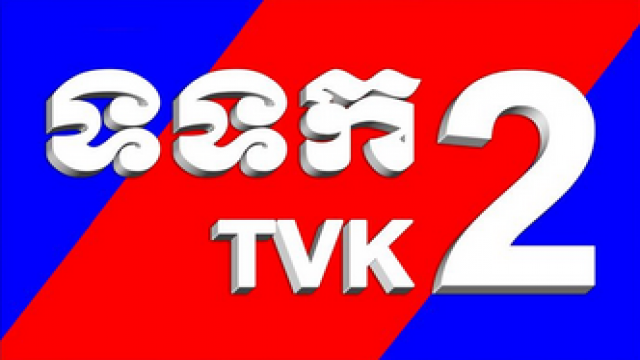
- Country: Cambodia
- Broadcast area: Nationwide and bordering areas near Laos, Vietnam and Thailand

Programming
- Picture format: HDTV (16:9 aspect ratio)

Ownership
- Sister channels: TVK

History
- Launched: 20 April 2020; 6 years ago

Links
- Website: www.tvk.gov.kh

TVK2 is a Cambodian television channel owned by National Television of Cambodia. The channel started broadcasting on 20 April 2020, during the pandemic, and is an educational service.

== History ==
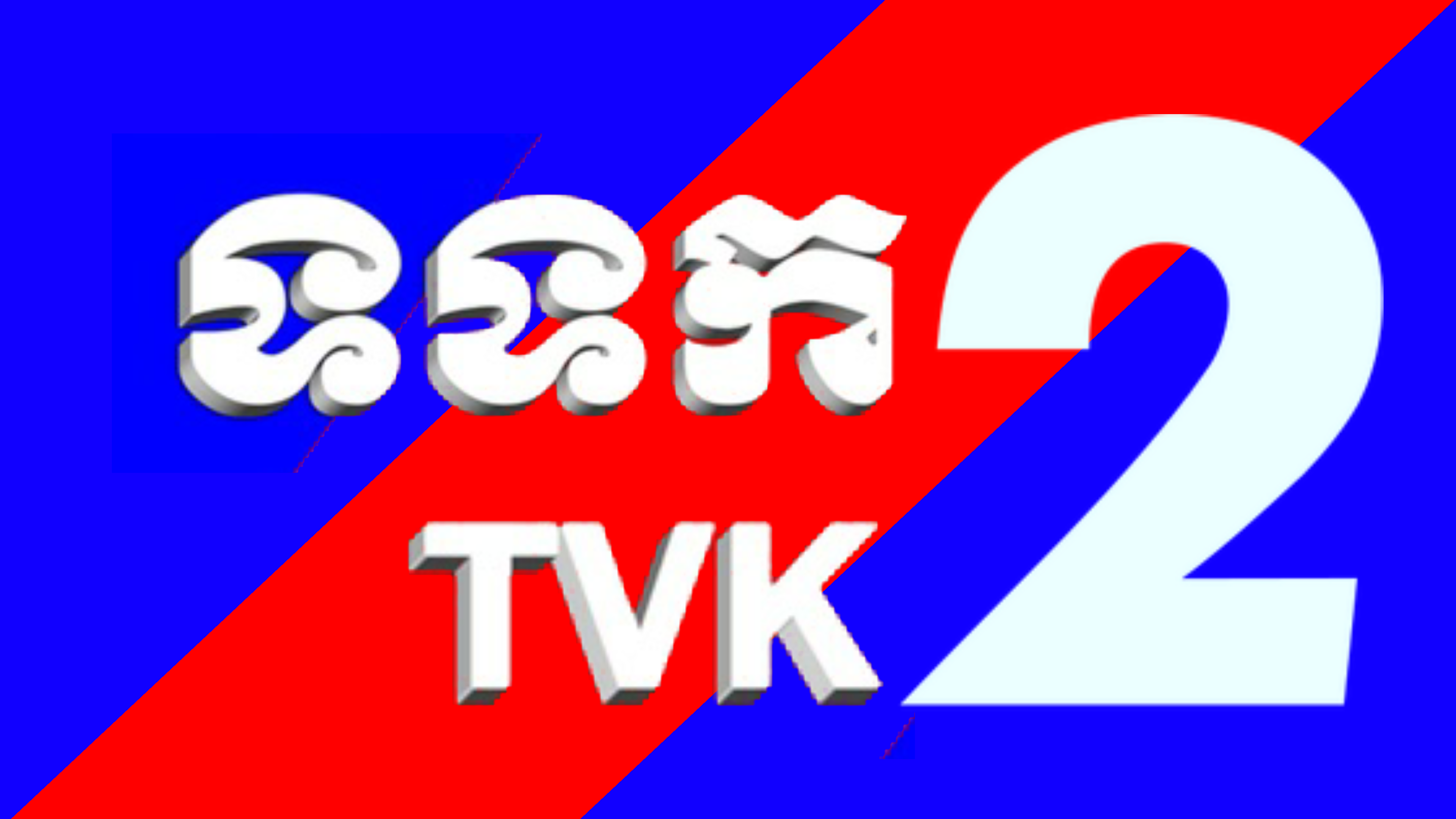
Logo since 2020

TVK2 started its trial broadcast on 20 April 2020, during a time where the pandemic caused schools to close. The channel was set up as a collaboration between the Ministry of Education and the Ministry of Education, Youth and Sport, and targeted audiences from kindergarten to 12th grade. The channel launched on digital satellite channel 22, cable television companies and the official TVK2 app. In the trial phase, the channel only broadcast videos produced by the MoEYS, and would launch new videos with higher production techniques in a second phase. After the pandemic's end, it was expected that TVK2 would restrict its service for 11th and 12th grade students, in order to prepare them for national high school exams.

By June, the channel started carrying Tey Tey Nitean, a joint production between the MoEYS and the Cambodian committee of UNICEF.

In 2023, the channel carried that year's SEA Games, alongside TVK, Bayon TV and BTV News (Bayon TV News), the local rights holders.
