= Channel 2 TV stations in Canada =

The following television stations broadcast on digital or analog channel 2 in Canada:

- CHBX-TV in Sault Ste. Marie, Ontario
- CKPG-TV in Prince George, British Columbia
- CKPR-DT in Thunder Bay, Ontario
- CHBC-DT in Kelowna, British Columbia

== Defunct ==
- CFCN-TV-16 in Oyen, Alberta
- CFJC-TV-19 in Pritchard, British Columbia
- CFRN-TV-5 in Lac La Biche, Alberta
- CIII-TV-2 in Bancroft, Ontario
- CJCH-TV-5 in Sheet Harbour, Nova Scotia
- CKBQ-TV in Melfort, Saskatchewan
- CKND-TV-2 in Minnedosa, Manitoba
- CKSA-DT in Lloydminster, Alberta/Saskatchewan
