= Tonfön Television =

Tongan pay TV provider

Tonfön Television is a Tongan pay TV service commencing in 2002, offering seven 24-hour channels of movies, news, sport and entertainment. Among the channels available are ABC Asia Pacific, BBC World, Fox News, in addition to four locally programmed channels, which include a sports channel, a family channel, a documentary/current affairs channel, and a movie channel.

Since November 2005, Tonfön TV has found itself facing stiff competition from a rival pay TV company, Sky Pacific, which offers more channels and a wider variety of programming to Tongan viewers. Tonfön announced that it would launch a seventh channel, a relay of Fox News, as its third relayed channel. In 2006, its subscribers were deprived of some 2006 Federated Shield matches due to negotiation issues with rights holder IMG Media. With the acquisition of Tonfön by Digicel, the service was replaced by Digicel's.
