= VAP-TV18 =

Defunct Tongan television channel

VAP-TV18, also known as Vision of Pilolevu, was a Tongan television channel owned by Siaosi Polutele Guttenbeil. The channel started terrestrial broadcasts in August 1983 in Nukuʻalofa being the first such television station in the country. Polutele had a three-hour-a-day - but not daily - schedule in what was considered to be a "do-it-yourself" format. Polutele had 20 years of experience in the field of television, working at television stations in New Zealand and as a TV repairman in the United States. The programming was entirely local: sports, news and current affairs. The television signal used by VAP-TV18 would reach a maximum of 100 television sets, aiming to cover the entirety of the island of Tongatapu. Startup costs for operation were estimated to be worth $10,000, with no charge to viewers, with the signal being entirely free-to-air. The station was supported by advertising, something a future competitor, ASTL-TV3, refused to carry until 1991.

By September 1984, both stations were operating on a verbal agreement issued by the government to carry out their services as a subscription, which was locally known as a "club membership". In early 1987, VAP-TV18 folded as the station had been broadcasting on an irregular basis for a few months by that point. With the closure of the service, Polutele reverted to his former business of repairing equipment.
