= Teledos (Peruvian TV channel) =

- Type: Free-to-air
- Country: Peru
- Broadcast area: Lima
- Headquarters: Lima

Ownership
- Owner: Movierecord; Metromedia

History
- Founded: 1957
- Launched: 27 May 1962; 64 years ago
- Closed: 1974; 52 years ago
- Former names: Victoria Televisión (1962-1964)

Availability

Terrestrial
- Analog VHF: Channel 2 (Lima, listings may vary)

Teledos was a Peruvian television station based in Lima, originally known as Victoria Televisión. The station was confiscated during Juan Velasco Alvarado's dictatorship and shut down in 1974; the license was later auctioned off in 1981, becoming Compañía Latinoamericana de Radiodifusión, doing business as Frecuencia 2, now Latina.

== History ==
In 1957, Eduardo Cavero, owner of a network of radio stations in Lima, receives the bid for VHF channel 2. The television station was named Victoria Televisión, after Radio Victoria, its main radio outlet. On May 27, 1962, Victoria Televisión starts broadcasting with emphasis on national and international music shows. One of its early successes was Show de Shows, presented by Luis Ángel Pinasco.

However, the station faced steep competition from channels 4 (América Televisión, owned by Nicanor González) and 5 (Panamericana Televisión, owned by Genaro Delgado Parker and Goar Mestre). In 1964, the station was sold to Movierecord and Metromedia, changing the corporate name to Tele 2 S.A.; it also fired its old staff in the process and suspended its operations in September 1964 to prepare for its relaunch under the new name. Since, legally, no foreigner could own a television license, Movierecord entrusted Peruvian national Manuel Belaúnde Guinassi as its representative. With its new transmitter atop La Milla (the previous transmitter was located at San Cristóbal), broadcasts resumed in December of that year; under its new manager Juan Ureta Mille, the station announced that it would increase its live output. In 1966, Movierecord inserted the station as part of its Olavisión (Organización Latinoamericana de Televisión, SA) project; the channel's logo was based on that of Movierecord, but with a 2 in the center. By then, knowing the failure of its existing format, it adopted a new programming line: the station aired movies in the afternoon and repeated them in the evening. In 1967, the station aired from 12pm to around midnight. In 1969, it aired The Three Stooges paired with La Tremenda Corte, as well as Mi querido marido and Simplicia la Secretaria, forming a daily slot of comedies (in rotation) at 8:30pm; the main movie of the night aired at 10pm after the news.

Before its closure, the state took over its operations; its license was expired in March 1972. In the second half of 1974, during the military dictatorship, Tele 2 ceased operations. Its final director, liutenant Luís Cabrejo, announced that its equipment would be auctioned off; Canal 7 subsequently became its beneficiary.

The license was recovered in the early 1980s by Baruch Ivcher (of Procacao) and relaunched the frequency as Frecuencia 2 in 1983, now known (since 2014) as Latina.
