= Train Valley 2 =

- Developer: Flazm
- Publisher: Flazm
- Producer: Alexey Davydov
- Designer: Anton Antsiferov
- Programmer: Sergey Dvoynikov
- Artist: Timofey Shargorodskiy
- Composer: Alexander Ahura
- Platforms: Windows; Linux; macOS
- Release: 13 April 2019
- Genres: Puzzle; strategy; train simulator
- Mode: Single-player

Screenshot from a level

Train Valley 2 is a puzzle-strategy train simulator video game developed by Flazm as a sequel to Train Valley. It was released in early access on 29 March 2018, and fully released on 13 April 2019.

== Gameplay ==
Cities demand various goods, such as cattle, furniture, iron ore, or steel plates. Each level is complete once all city demands are delivered to their respective stations, who also supply workers to operate industries. Unlike the original Train Valley, where the player just has to deliver a set number of trains, the player has to manage production chains (for instance: furniture requires glass and boards, which in turn requires sand and logs). In addition to raw materials, nearly every industry requires workers to operate, and some of them also require electricity, which in turn requires a connected, operating power plant. Also unlike the first game, passengers and destinations aren't randomized. Instead the player delivers workers and materials to the various industries using the locomotives available to him in the level. As goods are delivered, the player gains income that can be used to lay more track, upgrade his locomotives to go faster and carry larger loads, and buy more of them to operate more trains simultaneously.

Each level contains five objectives which create a five-star rating for the level. Two of the objectives are for accomplishing different tasks (such as "do not destroy tracks") while the other three tasks are time challenges (such as "complete the level in under 10 minutes"). Each objective gives the level one star. The early access version of Train Valley 2 contained 20 levels, and the full-release game contains 50 levels.

Train Valley 2 features a completely different art style from the original – Train Valley features a realistic style while Train Valley 2 has a low poly, simplistic art style.

== Development ==
The prequel to Train Valley 2, Train Valley, entered Steam Early Access on May 9, 2015, and was fully released on September 16, 2015.

On 23 December 2016, Flazm announced that Train Valley 2 was in development. The game was fully released on 13 April 2019.

== Reception ==
The game has been described as "a beautifully executed hybrid of puzzle game and tycoon sim that charms and challenges in equal measure." The graphics have been described as "aesthetically pleasing", with an "endearing sense of childish innocence", and has been compared to Poly Bridge. The terrain "can be difficult to interpret" but the maps are "still interesting and varied", with the game overall being a "little gem that will keep you entertained for hours." The way tracks are laid down in the game has been criticized, with them being described as "unnecessarily fiddly" with "a bit of trial and error involved in working out where you can actually build, especially when it comes to slopes."

The game won the DevGAMM Moscow 2018 conference's Grand Prize.
