= KACV-FM =

Radio station at Amarillo College in Amarillo, Texas

Amarillo, Texas; United States
- Frequency: 89.9 MHz
- Branding: FM90

Programming
- Format: College radio

Ownership
- Owner: Amarillo College; (Amarillo Junior College District)
- Sister stations: KACV-TV

History
- First air date: 1976
- Call sign meaning: Amarillo College Voice

Technical information
- Facility ID: 1234
- Class: C
- ERP: 100,000 watts
- HAAT: 352 meters (1,155 ft)
- Transmitter coordinates: 35°20′33″N 101°49′21″W

Links
- Webcast: Listen Live
- Website: kacvfm.org

KACV-FM (89.9 MHz, "FM90") is a college radio station in Amarillo, Texas, United States. The station is owned and operated by the city's community college, Amarillo College along with its television partner, PBS station KACV-TV (channel 2). Both KACV-FM-TV operate studios at Gilvin Broadcast Center on Amarillo College's Washington Street campus, while KACV-FM's transmitter is located north of Amarillo in unincorporated Potter County.

Founded in 1976, the station is a typical, unaffiliated campus radio station, featuring alternative rock music during the week. Beginning in 1987, the station carried the syndicated program Dr. Demento. Under a special contract, KACV was the only station allowed to air the program after Dr. Demento canceled his terrestrial broadcast in 2010 and moved exclusively to the Internet. KACV carried the Internet version of the show until early 2011.

== See also ==
- KACV-TV
- List of college radio stations in the United States
