= Channel 2 digital TV stations in the United States =

The following television stations broadcast on digital channel 2 in the United States:

Call Sign	Virtual Channel Number	City	State	Notes
K02AO-D	9	Eureka	Montana	Rebroadcasts KCFW-TV
K02EE-D	9	Weaverville	California	Rebroadcasts KIXE-TV
K02EG-D	3	Ursine	Nevada	Rebroadcasts KSNV
K02IK-D	9	Gateview	Colorado	
K02JG-D	8	Prospect	Oregon	Rebroadcasts KSYS
K02JJ-D	8	Williams	Oregon	Rebroadcasts KSYS
K02JO-D	5	Caliente	Nevada	Rebroadcasts KVVU-TV
K02KN-D	2	Kanarraville, etc.	Utah	Rebroadcasts KUTV
K02LH-D	4	Clarks Fork	Wyoming	Rebroadcasts KCWC-DT
K02LJ-D	2	Nondalton	Alaska	Rebroadcasts K03GL-D
K02NV-D	7	Sargents	Colorado	Rebroadcasts K25PT-D
K02OD-D	3	Shelter Cove	California	Rebroadcasts KIEM-TV
K02OG-D	17	Dolores	Colorado	Rebroadcasts K17JJ-D
K02OS-D	2	Weber Canyon	Colorado	
K02OU-D	17	Ismay Canyon	Colorado	Rebroadcasts K17JJ-D
K02QI-D	20	Hesperus	Colorado	Rebroadcasts KRMU
K02QP-D	45	Chowchilla	California	Rebroadcasts KQSL
K02QW-D	13	Reno	Nevada	
K02RA-D	2	Beaumont	Texas	
K02RI-D	16	Cedar City Canyon	Utah	Rebroadcasts KUPX-TV
K02RJ-D	28	Kalispell & Lakeside	Montana	Rebroadcasts KAYU-TV
K02RL-D	20	Indio	California	
KBFY-LD	41	Fortuna	Arizona	
KBRO-LD	34	Lyons	Colorado	ATSC 3.0 station
KFTY-LD	45	Middletown	California	Rebroadcasts KKPM-CD
KHIZ-LD	39	Los Angeles	California	
KHME	23	Rapid City	South Dakota	
KHSV	21	Las Vegas	Nevada	
KLNK-LD	48	Groveton	Texas	
KNOP-TV	2	North Platte	Nebraska	
KQRO-LD	45	Morgan Hill	California	Rebroadcasts KKPM-CD
KREX-TV	5	Grand Junction	Colorado	
KSFW-LD	43	Dallas	Texas	
KTNR-LD	29	Laredo	Texas	
W02CS-D	28	Ponce	Puerto Rico	
W02CT-D	28	Arecibo	Puerto Rico	
W02CU-D	28	Mayagüez	Puerto Rico	
W02CY-D	24	New York	New York	
WDPN-TV	2	Wilmington	Delaware	
WGGS-TV	16	Greenville	South Carolina	
WHDF	15	Florence	Alabama	
WHNH-CD	2	Manchester, etc.	Vermont	
WKWT-LD	42	Key West	Florida	
WLBZ	2	Bangor	Maine	
WLMO-LD	2	Fort Wayne	Indiana	
WRIW-CD	51	Providence	Rhode Island	Uses WSBE-TV's spectrum
WSBE-TV	36	Providence	Rhode Island	
WUVM-LD	4	Atlanta	Georgia	
WVIR-TV	29	Charlottesville	Virginia	

The following television stations, which are no longer licensed, formerly broadcast on digital channel 2 in the United States:

Call Sign	Virtual Channel Number	City	State	Notes
K02KZ-D	2	Kobuk	Alaska	
K02LY-D	2	Gunnison	Colorado	
K02QM-D	3	Lemon, etc.	Alaska	Rebroadcast KTOO-TV
K02RG-D		Gateway	Colorado	
K02RM-D	34	Wendover	Nevada	
KFAK-LD	10	Boise	Idaho	
KITM-LD	2	Lahaina	Hawaii	
KYAN-LD	43	Los Angeles	California	
KZED-LD		Kurtistown	Hawaii	
W02AT-D		Burnsville	North Carolina	Rebroadcast WSPA-TV
W02AU-D	8	St. Francis	Maine	Rebroadcast WAGM-TV
