= Medientage München =

The Medientage München (Munich Media Days) are held annually in Munich as a congress of the communications industry. An exhibition is organized and occurs at the same time. Every year in October, media entrepreneurs, media makers, and media politicians meet for three days. In 2015 more than 6,200 participants attended the congress, exhibition and events around the Medientage München.

The Medientage München 2015 took place from 21 to 23 October, at the International Congress Center (ICM) of Messe München with the support from the Bavarian State and the Bavarian Regulatory Authority for Commercial Broadcasting (Bayerische Landeszentrale für neue Medien – BLM).

== History ==
Medientage München were founded in 1987 by Wolf-Dieter Ring and Edmund Stoiber (both members of the State Chancellery at the time), on behalf of the Bavarian government. The event is intended to bring private radio and television broadcasters, newspaper and magazine publishers, together with public broadcasters in joint discussions. The discussion topics range from current media policies relating to advertising, to marketing and program quality issues in regard to the protection of minors. The Medientage München GmbH is the organizer of the congress since 1999. Managing directors are Reiner Müller, Johannes Kors and Christopher Tusch. The GmbH is a wholly owned subsidiary of the Bavarian Regulatory Authority for Commercial Broadcasting (BLM).

== Congress ==
The Medientage München are considered one of the most important events of the German media industry. The speakers are from the television, radio, print and mobile, and digital business industries, along with advertisers, media politicians and filmmakers. To kick-off the Medientage München, the Minister-President of Bavaria opens the event with the Mediengipfel (Media Summit).

== Media exhibition ==
At the exhibition, which is held at the same time, presentations from companies, institutions, and initiatives from media and communication industries can be found. On the grounds of the MedienCampus Bayern, media training centers, journalism schools and employers in the media industry present themselves. Young professionals can find out about education and training for the media industry.

== Other events ==
Alongside the event is the “Nacht der Medien” ("Night of the media").

In addition to the central meeting point of the Medientage München, the Medientage München GmbH organizes further events to assist the communication industry – including the Audiovisual Media Days (AVMD): A congress for motion pictures media, marketing and corporate communication, that is held annually in Munich. Where some 400 representatives of the motion picture industry meet to report on trends surrounding online video, smart and web TV.

Additionally are the Munich Gaming and the Medientage Special (Media Days Special).

== Literature ==
Wolfram Winter (editor): Die Medientage München im Wandel der Zeit und ihre Zukunftsperspektiven. Medien: Forschung und Wissenschaft volume 30, 2012, ISBN 978-3-643-11516-4
