= Oceania Broadcasting Network =

Free-to-air television network in Tonga

- Country: Tonga

Ownership
- Owner: Christopher Racine

History
- Founded: September 29, 1991; 34 years ago
- Launched: September 29, 1991; 34 years ago
- Founder: King Taufa'ahau Tupou IV

Oceania Broadcasting Network (also known as OBN, or by its call letters A3M-TV 7) began operating in 1991 by Hawaiian fundamentalist Christians. Historically, it was known for its excess of religious and news programming. With the closure of ASTL-TV3 in 1996, it became the country's only television station until the opening of Television Tonga in 2000.

During the 1990s, OBN was presided by Christopher J. Racine, who in 1995 was involved in obtaining an FM license for American Samoa.

== Opening ==
OBN was officially opened by King Taufa'ahau Tupou IV on September 29, 1991. It was the second TV station broadcasting in NTSC to operate in the Kingdom, initially running in direct competition against rival Tongan TV channel ASTL-TV3, before the latter ceased operations in 1993.

== Building ==
The building station was licensed to was supposedly leased by a unit of the Church of Jesus Christ of Latter-day Saints. After their property lease was cut short by the King, the Mormons were forced to relocate to Liahona. The building was then leased to a Chinese entrepreneur, who set up the Tong-Hua Chinese Restaurant. Tong-Hua inhabited the building for almost ten years, until they were also forced to relocate when the king granted a lifetime lease to TV 7. The original TV tower was attached to the part of the building where the spire once stood.

== Christian influence ==
OBN started primarily as a Christian station, but later, at the king's request, expanded its programming to include other genres, such as news, sport and general entertainment.

As of 1993, the channel broadcast three hours in the morning and four-and-a-half hours in the evening. Per a UNESCO survey held at the time, station manager Ray Wick said that an estimated 70% of the schedule was made up of religious content, with a short-term plan to reduce said proportion to 60%. The excess of religious programming on OBN led to massive viewer preference over ASTL-TV3.

Christian programming broadcast on a regular basis included:

- Billy Graham Ministries
- Hillsong Television
- In Touch
- 700 Club International

The Christian output was relayed from the American Trinity Broadcasting Network.

== Additional channels ==
In 1998, OBN expanded its operations with the upgrade of its studio facilities, the installation of two giant satellite dishes and a new tower, the tallest in Tonga. Three additional free-to-air channels were also opened to the viewing public, Channel 8 (a PAL version of Channel 7), Channel 9 (broadcasting CNN, and later BBC World & Fox News in NTSC), and Channel 10 (a PAL version of Channel 9). This is when the company started emphasising the OBN moniker, as opposed to TV 7. However, the station is perhaps still best known (and more popularly referred to) among viewers as TV 7. In 2000, OBN ceased to operate Channel 9, after the Tongan government revoked OBN's license for that frequency. The government then allocated Channel 9 for its own television station, TV Tonga. OBN later dropped Channel 10, broadcasting on Channels 7(NTSC) & 8(PAL) only.

By 2011, its 60-meter tower became dormant, implying the channel was now off air.

== Influence in Tongan politics ==
While originally distancing itself from Tongan politics, OBN seemed to change its stance when it went commercial. The first such case dates back to February 2003, after OBN aired a debate on the ban of the Taimi 'o Tonga newspaper. After that, the Taimi moved to Auckland. At 6pm on December 22, 2004, a power cut knocked OBN off air, which Sangster Saulaia thought to be a sabotage operation against the channel. With the pro-government TV Tonga's outright refusal to air any program supporting the Human Rights and Democracy Movement during the 2005 civil servants' strike, OBN became an outlet for the voice of the strikers allowing a moral balanced and open freedom of speech unlike the government controlled station. On July 27, 2005, its power supply was deliberately cut off again, leading to concern over the possible bulldozing of its facilities. Silenced by government in 2006 in an attempt to control the media in Tonga, the station is due to commence programming again in March, 2009.

== Other controversies ==
An edition of Check it Out! in October 1999 conflicted the constitution.

== Local programs produced at OBN ==
- Check it Out! with Kilisitina Vaea
- Good Morning Tonga
- OBN Tonga News
- Pole 'o e Kuonga
- Stars on Sunday
- Tala 'o Tonga
