= Tonga Broadcasting Commission =

State broadcaster in Tonga

Coordinates: 21°8′24.25″S 175°11′32.66″W

Tonga Broadcasting Commission Komisoni Fakamafolalea Tonga

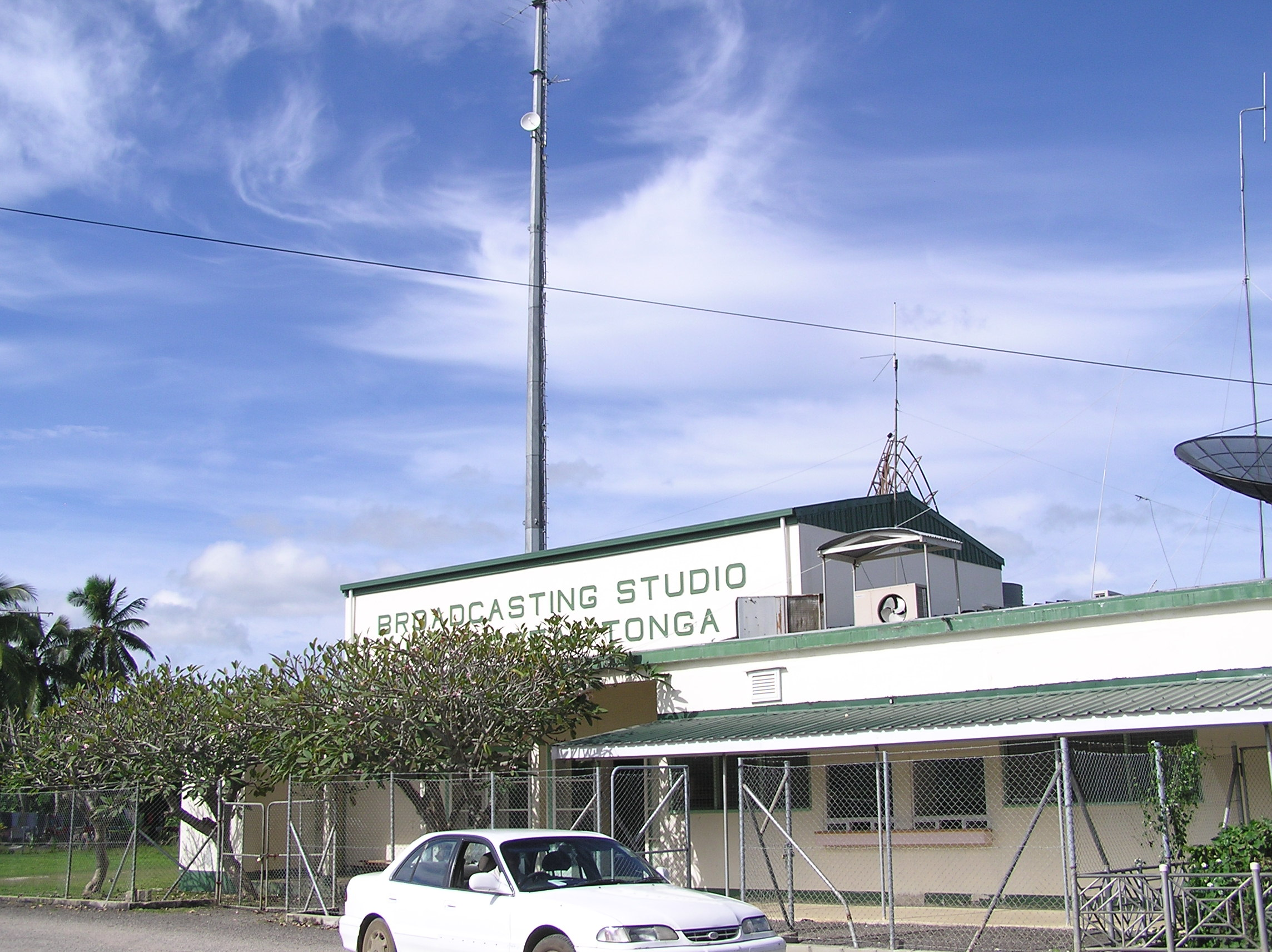
- TBC studios & tower at Fasi-moe-afi, Tonga
- Type: Public broadcasting
- Branding: TBC
- Country: Tonga
- Availability: Nationwide
- Founded: 1961; 65 years ago
- TV stations: Television Tonga and Television Tonga 2
- Radio stations: Radio Tonga
- Headquarters: Nukuʻalofa, Tonga
- Broadcast area: Tonga
- Owner: Government of Tonga
- Key people: Feleti Sevele (Chairman, Board of Directors) ʻElenoa ʻAmanaki (General Manager)
- Launch date: 1961
- Official website: tbc.to

Tonga Broadcasting Commission (TBC; Tongan: Komisoni Fakamafolalea Tonga) is the first and largest broadcasting station in Tonga, solely owned by the government of Tonga. It operates two free-to-air TV channels (Television Tonga and Television Tonga 2), one AM commercial radio station (Radio Tonga), one FM commercial radio station (Kool 90FM), and a 24-hour Radio Australia relay station (FM103). TBC relies on profits from its TV & radio advertising sales, and from its retail radio shop outlet located in Vavaʻu. Its retail radio shop in Nukuʻalofa's Central Business District was among the numerous businesses destroyed in the riots of 16 November 2006.
