= Television Tonga =

Tongan television channel

- Country: Tonga

Ownership
- Owner: Government of Tonga (privately operated by Tonga Broadcasting Commission)
- Sister channels: Television Tonga 2

History
- Founded: 4 July 2000; 26 years ago
- Launched: 4 July 2000; 26 years ago
- Founder: Tāufaʻāhau Tupou IV

Television Tonga is a Tongan television channel operated by the Tonga Broadcasting Commission. It was founded on 4 July 2000 by King Taufa'ahau Tupou IV.

The TV Tonga studios and broadcast facilities are located in Fasi-moe-afi, near the Tongan capital Nukuʻalofa. They currently broadcast across Tongatapu, 'Eua and other closely surrounding islands, such as Pangaimotu and 'Atata.

TV Tonga produces a weeknightly national TV news program from Monday to Friday in two versions, English and Tongan; and a week-in-review program on Saturday. They also cover local sports and events of national interest.

TV Tonga maintains a website, with an online news service. It launched alongside the channel.

== History ==
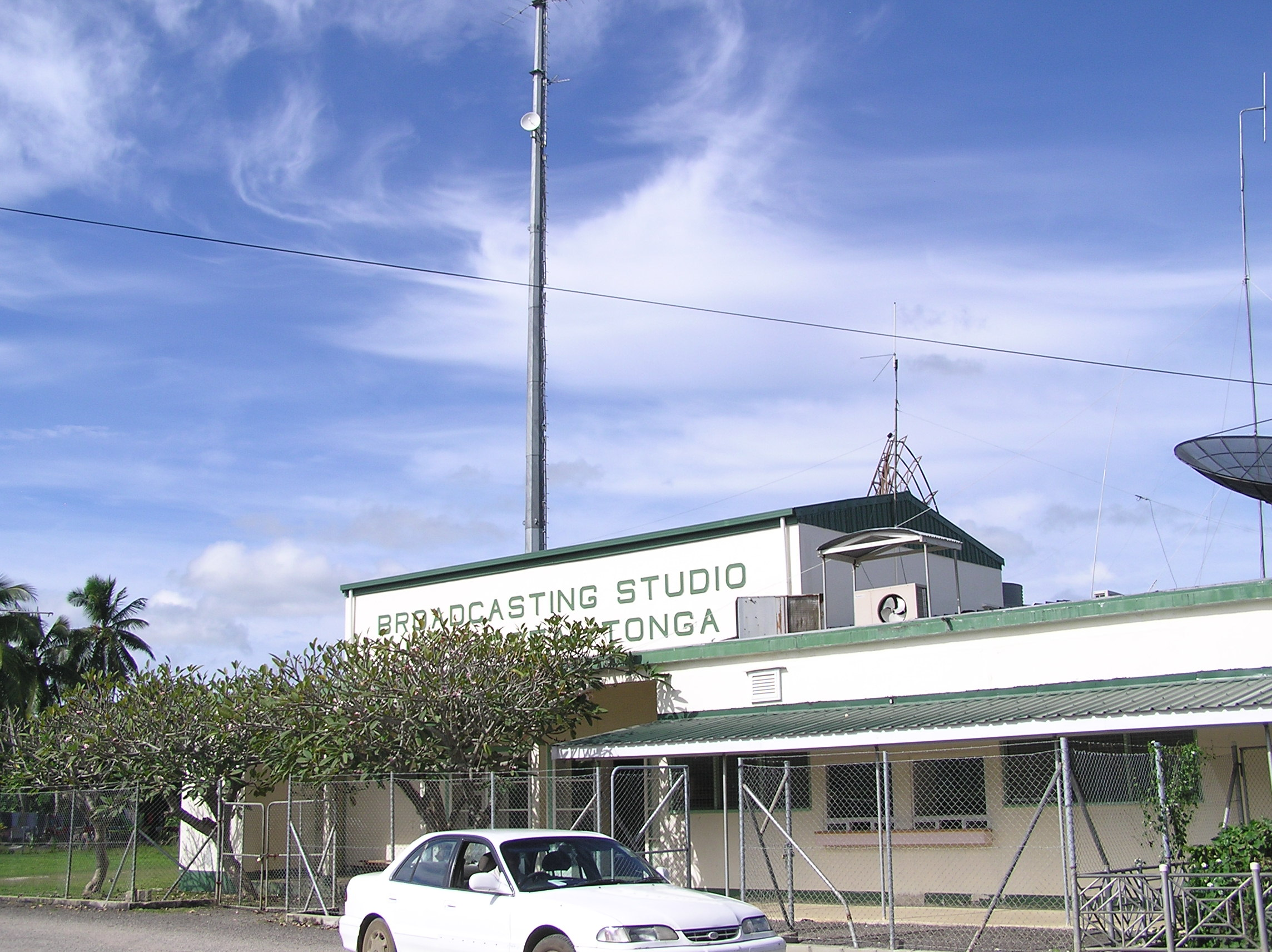
TV Tonga/TBC studios & tower at Fasi-moe-afi, Tonga.

The station was built in 1999 by RFO Polynésie, which held a two-week training session in August accompanied by journalists from RFO's Pacific branches in New Caledonia, Wallis and Futuna and French Polynesia.

While TV Tonga is working in affiliation with overseas broadcasters and becoming more of a relaying station, in 2008 it launched a second channel, Television Tonga 2, for its domestic service. General Manager 'Elenoa 'Amanaki has stated that the second English program channel would leave the original channel, formerly broadcasting 60% in English, 40% in Tongan, for Tongan language programs only.

There was a special service in Vavaʻu, which as of 2011 received files from Tongatapu via an undersea cable.
