= Television in Austria =

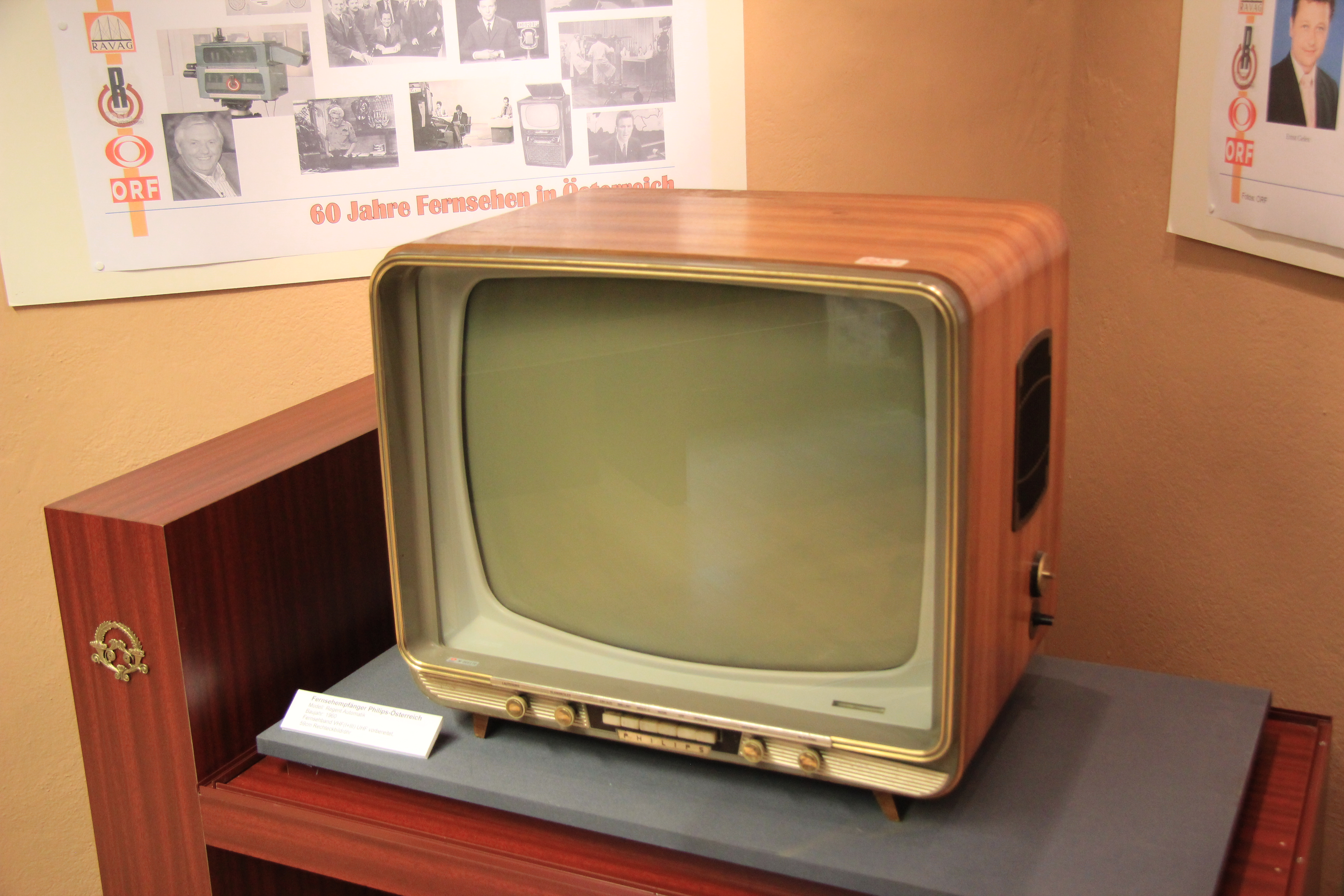
Regent Automatic (Philips Austria; Heimatmuseum, Austria)

Television in Austria was introduced in 1955. The country uses DVB-T for broadcasting. Analog television was completely shut down on 7 June 2011. Austrian television was monopolised by public broadcasting television stations until 2000. The first private television station in Austria was Tele Uno which was broadcasting from the tripoint between Italy, Austria and Yugoslavia from the Italian side, however the first regular private television station was ATV.

== List of channels ==
=== Public ===
- ORF 1 (also in HD)
- ORF 2 (also in HD)
- ORF 2 Europe
- ORF III
- ORF Sport +
- 3sat - public channel in association with ORF, ARD, ZDF and SRF

=== Commercial ===
- ATV
- ATV II (DE)
- Puls 4
- Puls 24 (DE)
- Servus TV
- OE24.TV
- Geo Television (DE)
- Kanal Telemedial
- Melodie Express (DE)
- Sky Krimi
- Canal+ Action (DE)

=== Non-Commercial ===
- Okto (DE)
- FS1
- dorf (DE)

=== Austrian versions of German TV Channels ===
- ProSieben Austria
- Sat.1 Österreich
- kabel eins Austria
- MTV Austria (only local advertisement-break aways)
- Nickelodeon Austria
- RTL Zwei Austria (only local advertisement-break aways)
- RTL Austria (only local advertisement-break aways)
- Comedy Central Austria (only local advertisement-break aways)
- VOX Austria (only local advertisement-break aways)
- n-tv Österreich (only local advertisement-break aways)
- RTLup Österreich (only local advertisement-break aways)
- sixx Austria (only local advertisement-break aways)
- Nitro Österreich (only local advertisement-break aways)
- Sat.1 Gold Österreich (only local advertisement-break aways)
- Sky Österreich (DE) (only local advertisement-break aways)

=== Local ===
- LT1 (DE) (Linz)
- Innsat.TV (DE) (Upper Austria)
- P3tv (DE) (St. Pölten)
- Austria24 TV (DE) (regional - Perg)
- LinzLand TV (DE) (Linz-Land)
- M4 Mostviertelfernsehen (DE) (Amstetten)
- Mühlviertel TV (DE) (regional - Freistadt)
- RTS Regionalfernsehen Salzburg (DE) (Salzburg)
- RTV Regionalfernsehen OÖ (DE) (Garsten)
- Schau TV (DE) (Vienna, Burgenland, & Lower Austria; eventually Centrope)
- Tirol TV (DE) (Innsbruck, Tyrol)
- W24 (DE) (Vienna)
- WT1 (DE) (regional - Wels)
- RE eins (DE) (Reutte District)
- Kanal3 (DE) (West Styria - West, West & Graz, Mur-Mürztal regional, & Mur-Mürztal regional cable)

=== Pay TV ===
- Sky Austria
- HD Plus Austria
- UPC Austria
- A1 TV

== Most-viewed channels ==
The channels with the largest viewing share in 2024 are:

Position	Channel	Group	Share of total viewing (%)
1	ORF 2	ORF	20.9
2	ORF 1	ORF	10.1
3	ServusTV	Red Bull Media House	5.3
4	ZDF	ZDF	4.6
5	RTL	RTL Group	3.5
6	Vox	RTL Group	3.4
7	Das Erste	ARD	3.2
8	ATV	ProSiebenSat.1 Media	2.5
8	Puls 4	ProSiebenSat.1 Media	2.5
9	Sat.1	ProSiebenSat.1 Media	2.2

== See also ==
- List of German-language television channels

== Bibliography ==
- Bibliography Television in Austria (Site "Histoire de la télévision"
