= Eurovision Young Musicians 2010 =

International youth classical music contest

Dates and venues
- Semi-final 1: 8 May 2010
- Semi-final 2: 9 May 2010; ORF Funkhaus Wien Vienna, Austria
- Final: 14 May 2010; Rathausplatz Vienna, Austria

Organisation
- Organiser: European Broadcasting Union (EBU)
- Executive supervisor: Tal Barnea

Production
- Host broadcaster: Österreichischer Rundfunk (ORF)
- Director: Heidelinde Haschek
- Musical director: Cornelius Meister
- Presenter: Christoph Wagner-Trenkwitz

Participants
- Number of entries: 15
- Number of finalists: 7
- Debuting countries: Belarus
- Returning countries: Czech Republic
- Non-returning countries: Finland; Serbia; Ukraine
- Participation map: Finalist countries Countries eliminated in the semi-final Countries that participated in the past but not in 2010

Vote
- Voting system: Each juror awarded a mark from 1–10 to each performer
- Winning musician: Slovenia; Eva Nina Kozmus

Eurovision Young Musicians 2010 was the 15th edition of Eurovision Young Musicians. It consisted of two semi-finals on 8 and 9 May, held at ORF Funkhaus Wien, and a final on 14 May 2010, held at the Rathausplatz in Vienna, Austria, and presented by Christoph Wagner-Trenkwitz. It was organised by the European Broadcasting Union (EBU) and host broadcaster Österreichischer Rundfunk (ORF). The Vienna Symphony Orchestra conducted by Cornelius Meister accompanied all competing performers. This was the third time that the competition was held on an open-air stage and was the beginning of the annual Vienna Festival. ORF had previously hosted the contest in Austria in 1990, 1998, 2006 and 2008.

Musicians representing fifteen countries took part in the competition, with seven of them participating in the televised final. Belarus made their début while Czech Republic returned. Three countries decided not to participate, they were Finland, Serbia and Ukraine.

The winner was flutist Eva Nina Kozmus representing Slovenia, with violinist Guro Kleven Hagen representing Norway placing second, and pianist Daniil Trifonov representing Russia placing third. Kozmus is the first flute player to win the competition.

== Location ==
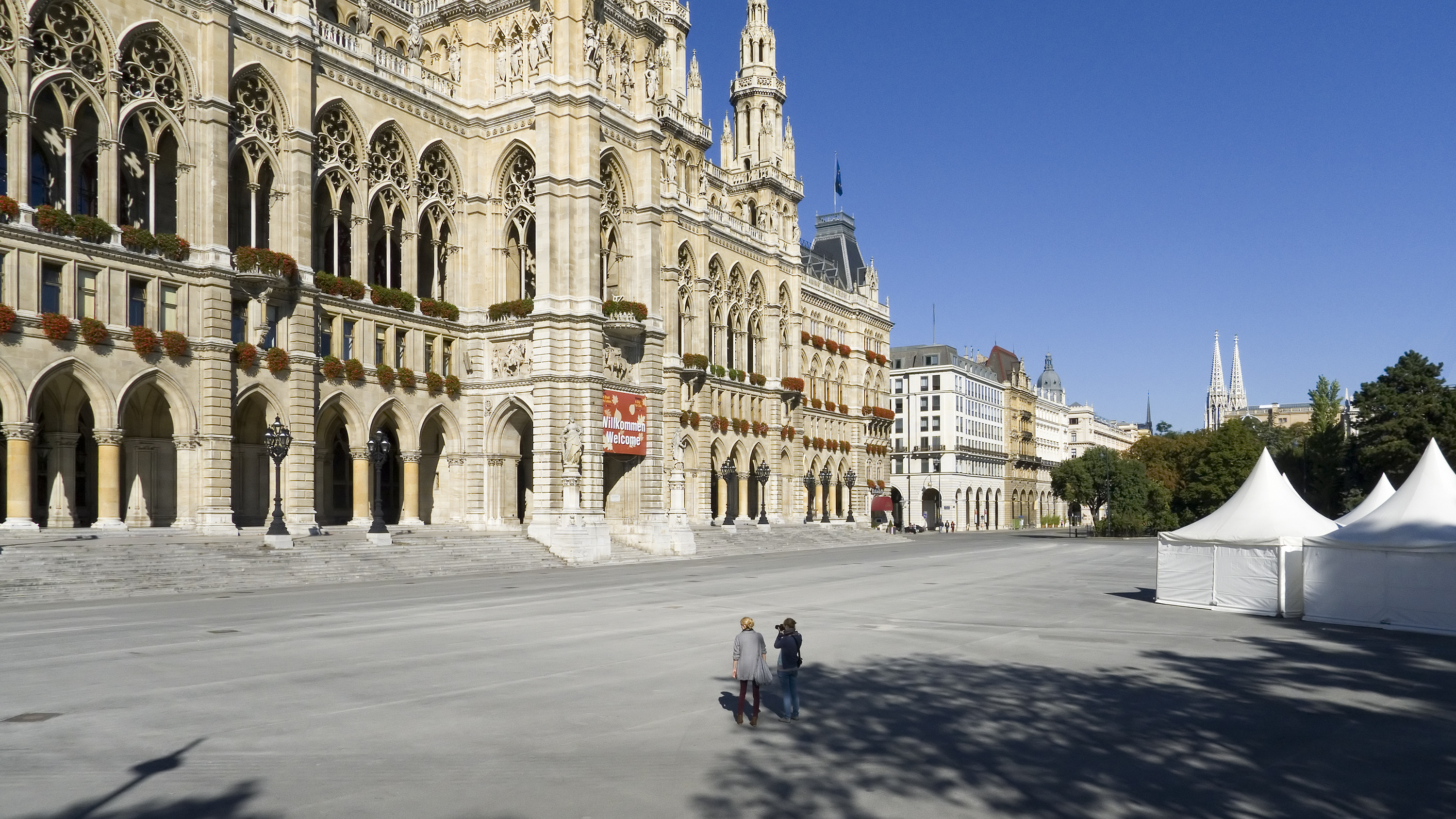
Rathausplatz, Vienna was the host location of the Eurovision Young Musicians 2010 final.

Rathausplatz, a square outside the Wiener Rathaus city hall of Vienna, was the host location for the 2010 edition of the Eurovision Young Musicians final. The ORF Funkhaus Wien studios in Vienna, Austria, hosted the semi-final round.

== Format ==
Christoph Wagner-Trenkwitz was the host of the 2010 contest. The winner was awarded a master-class scholarship and the top three performers were awarded cash prizes, together with a custom-made trophy. As in 2008, television viewers in the host country were able to vote for their favourite performer via SMS.

== Participants and results ==
=== Semi-final ===
Broadcasters from fifteen countries took part in the semi-final round of the 2010 contest, of which seven qualified to the televised grand final. The following participants failed to qualify.

Country	Broadcaster	Performer	Instrument
Austria	ORF	Marie-Christine Klettner	Violin
Cyprus	CyBC	Lambis Pavlou	Piano
Czech Republic	ČT	Lukáš Dittrich	Clarinet
Greece	ERT	Konstantinos Destounis	Piano
Netherlands	NPS	Dana Zemtsov	Viola
Romania	TVR	Stefan Cazacu	Cello
Sweden	SVT	Mattias Hanskov Palm	Double bass
United Kingdom	BBC	Peter Moore	Trombone

=== Final ===
Awards were given to the top three participants. The table below highlights these using gold, silver, and bronze. The placing results of the remaining participants is unknown and never made public by the European Broadcasting Union.

R/O	Country	Broadcaster	Performer	Instrument	Piece	Composer	Result
1	Croatia	HRT	Filip Merčep	Percussions	Marimba Concerto, 2nd mov.	Emmanuel Séjourné	
2	Norway	NRK	Guro Kleven Hagen	Violin	Violin Concerto in D-Major, 3rd mov.	Peter Tchaikovsky	2
3	Poland	TVP	Bartosz Głowacki	Accordion	Accordion Concerto "Classico"	Mikolaj Majkusiak	
4	Germany	WDR	Hayrapet Arakelyan	Saxophone	Fantaisie Brilliante	Francois Borne	
5	Belarus	BTRC	Ivan Karizna	Cello	Cello Concerto in C Major, 3rd mov.	Joseph Haydn	
6	Slovenia	RTVSLO	Eva Nina Kozmus	Flute	Flute Concerto, 3rd mov. Allegro scherzando	Jacques Ibert	1
7	Russia	RTR	Daniil Trifonov	Piano	Grande Polonaise Brillante	Frédéric Chopin	3

== Jury ==
The jury members consisted of the following:

=== Semi-final ===
- Austria – Werner Hink
- Austria – Ranko Markovic
- Austria – Aleksandar Markovic
- Norway – Ingela Øien
- Turkey – Hüseyin Sermet

=== Final ===
- Hungary – Peter Eötvös (head)
- Austria – Werner Hink
- Brazil – Cristina Ortiz
- United Kingdom – Ben Pateman
- Russia – Alexei Ogrintchouk

== Broadcasting ==
The competition was transmitted live over the Eurovision Network, for both TV viewers and radio listeners, by eleven out of the twenty participating broadcasters. Armenia, Belgium, Denmark, Estonia and Iceland all broadcast the contest in addition to the competing countries. Known details on the broadcasts in each country, including the specific broadcasting stations and commentators are shown in the tables below.

Broadcasters in participating countries
Country	Broadcaster(s)	Channel(s)	Commentator(s)	Ref(s)
Austria	ORF (live)	ORF 2		
Belarus	BTRC (live)			
Croatia	HRT (live)			
Cyprus	CyBC (live)			
Czech Republic	ČT (live)			
Germany	ARD (WDR)	WDR Fernsehen (Note: Delayed broadcast on 23 May at 11:10)		
Germany	3sat (live)			
Greece	ERT (live)			
Netherlands	NPS			
Norway	NRK (live)	NRK2		
Poland	TVP (live)	TVP Kultura		
Romania	TVR (live)	TVR Cultural		
Russia	RTR (live)			
Slovenia	RTVSLO			
Sweden	SVT	SVT2 (Note: Delayed broadcast on 29 May at 20:00)		
United Kingdom	BBC	BBC Four (Note: Delayed broadcast, in a shortened format, on 21 May at 19:30)	Clemency Burton-Hill	

Broadcasters in non-participating countries
Country	Broadcaster	Channel(s)	Commentator(s)	Ref(s)
Armenia	ARMTV (live)			
Belgium	RTBF	La Deux (Note: The contest was featured in an edition of Le meilleur du classique (The Best of Classical Music) broadcast on 2 June at 22:50)		
Denmark	DR			
Estonia	ERR			
Iceland	RÚV			

== See also ==
- Eurovision Song Contest 2010
- Junior Eurovision Song Contest 2010
