= ORF 2 Europe =

- Country: Europe

Programming
- Picture format: Resolution: 720p (HDTV); Aspect Ratio: 16:9

Ownership
- Owner: ORF
- Sister channels: ORF 1 ORF 2 ORF III; ORF Sport +

History
- Launched: July 5, 2004; 21 years ago

Links
- Website: tv.orf.at/program/orf2

ORF 2 Europe is a free-to-air version of the Austrian TV channel ORF 2. The service differs from the Austrian version in that some programs (mainly Sports and foreign films, as well as all programs between approx. Midnight and 6am CET) are replaced with page 100 of ORF 2 Teletext and the sound of Ö1, ORF's main radio service. It has been broadcast across Europe since July 2004.

== History ==
ORF 2 Europe was announced with an "ORF 2 free 2 air" campaign in June 2004, eyeing a 5 July 2004 launch date. The channel was available free-to-air from 4pm to 12:30am. During the rest of the day, the signal was encrypted due to legal reasons.
