= ORF regional studios =

Branch offices of ORF

The ORF regional studios are branch offices from ORF in each state of Austria. Since 1975 there is also a regional office in and since 2021 a broadcasting TV studio in Bolzano for the German-speaking population of South Tyrol, Italy.

== Regional studios ==
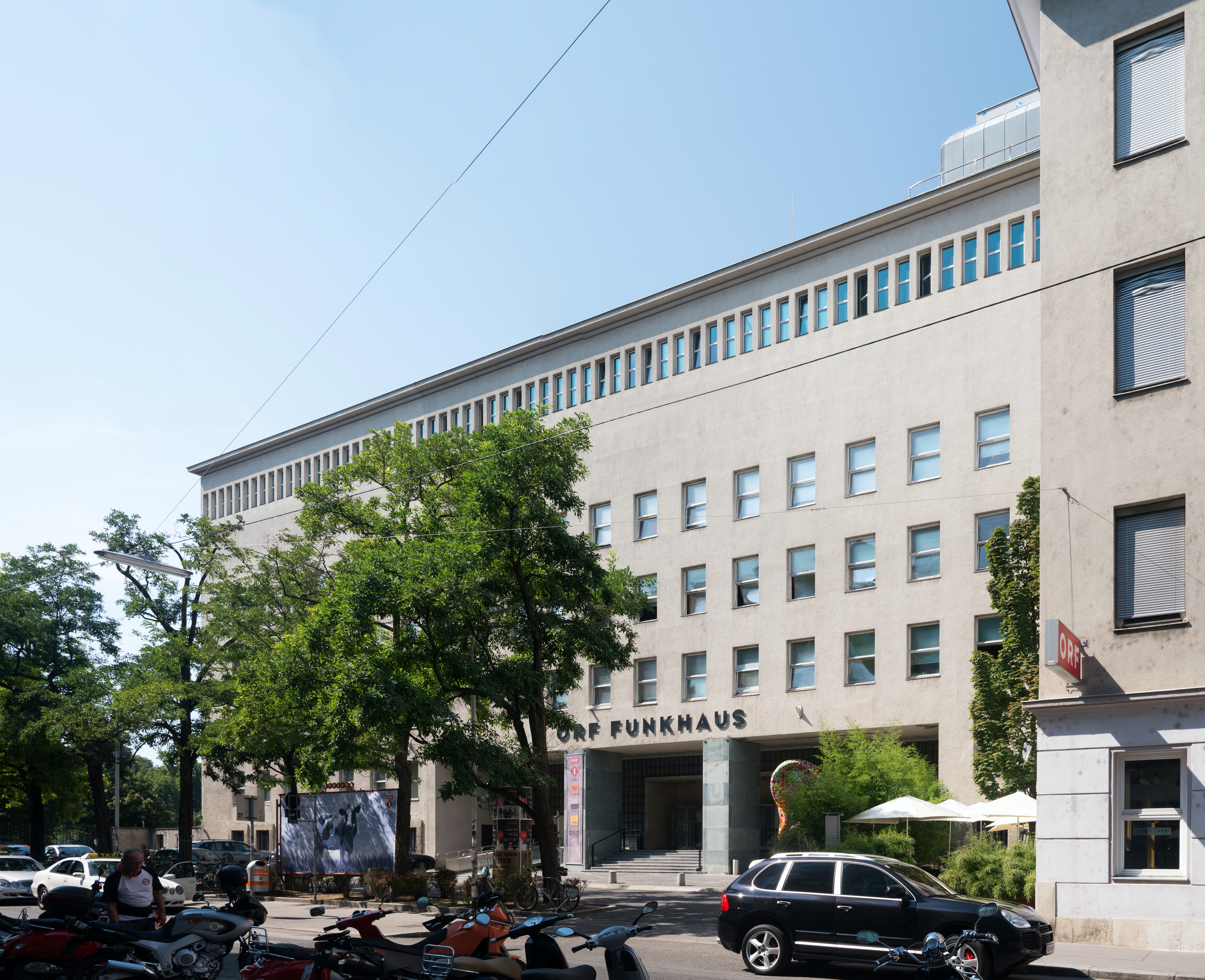
Funkhaus Wien at Argentinierstraße in Vienna (2015)

The regional studios produce their own state radio, broadcast in the whole state. These regional radios are in the Ö2 group. The regional studio in Carinthia also produces the ORF Radio Dva. For television, each regional studio produces its own news with weather for the state, which are broadcast in their state simultaneously on the TV channel ORF2.

Every Sunday at 6:30pm, one regional studio gets chosen to produces an edition of Österreich Bild, which shows the highlights of their state to the rest of Austria. Similar topics are also covered in the show Erlebnis Österreich, Saturdays at 5:05pm, where the regional studios contribute with articles and interviews. Each regional studio has its own web portal on the internet, providing recent news for their state.

The regional studios also play a part in the national news and shows. For the nationwide news show Zeit im Bild, articles get sent directly to the ORF Center in Vienna, ready to be broadcast. For some shows like Thema or Der Report, the moderator from Vienna travels to the different places in Austria, and the regional studio of the state involved only provides a camera team or equipment.

The headquarters of each regional office is always in the capital of the state, except in Vorarlberg, where the headquarters are in Dornbirn, the largest city of Vorarlberg. Even though the ORF Center is located in Vienna, Vienna also has its own independent studio, which is located in the Funkhaus Wien. Every regional office has a regional director, and all regional studios and offices were built by the same architect, Gustav Peichl, so all buildings look similar.

Logos of the ORF regional studios (2015)

ORF Burgenland

ORF Kärnten

ORF Niederösterreich

ORF Oberösterreich

ORF Salzburg

ORF Steiermark

ORF Tirol

ORF Vorarlberg

ORF Wien

=== Burgenland (B) ===
The regional studio for Burgenland is located on the Buchgraben 51 in Eisenstadt. The regional director is Karlheinz Papst.

=== Carinthia (K) ===
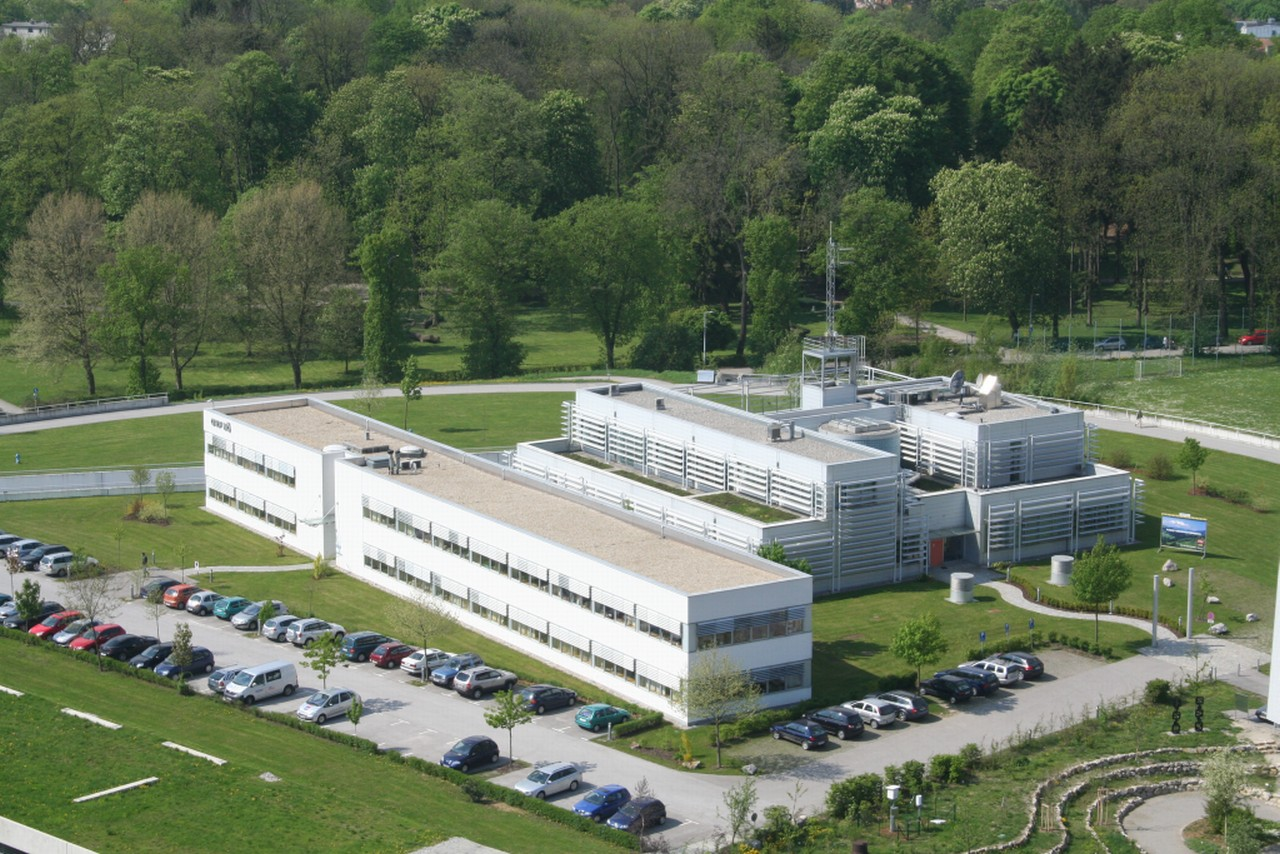
Regional studio in Lower Austria

The regional studio for Carinthia is located on the Sponheimer Straße in Klagenfurt. The regional director is Karin Bernhard.

=== Lower Austria (NÖ) ===
The regional studio for Lower Austria is located on the Radioplatz 1 in St. Pölten. The regional director is Norbert Gollinger.

=== Upper Austria (OÖ) ===
The regional studio for Upper Austria is located on the Europaplatz 3 in Linz. The regional director is Kurt Rammerstorfer.

=== Salzburg (S) ===
The regional studio for Upper Austria is located on the Nonntaler Hauptstrasse 49d in Salzburg. The regional director is Roland Brunhofer.

=== Styria (St) ===
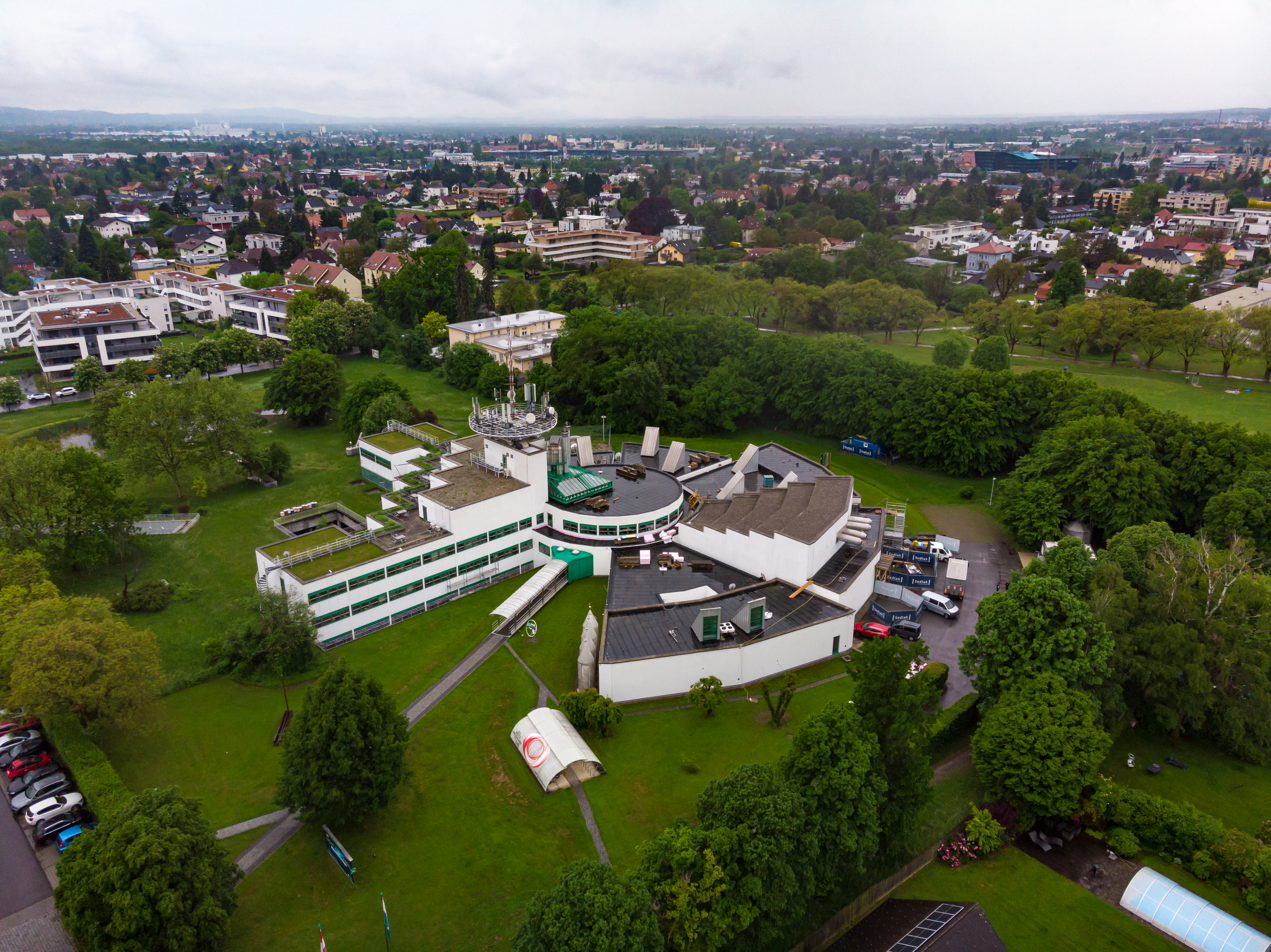
Regional studio in Styria (2019)

The regional studio for Styria is located on the Marburgerstrasse 20 in Graz. The regional director is Gerhard Draxler.

During 1978 and 1981 the new regional studio for Styria was built by the architect Architekt Peichl.

Externally, it resembles the other regional studios in Austria. Just the interiors were designed with the latest state-of-the-art technology. The official opening took place on 12. September 1981.

The old studio, the Ferry-Palace in the Zusertalgasse, was sold to the Handelskammer.

In the regional studio for Styria, the daily news show Steiermark heute gets produced. It also produces articles for the shows Erlebnis Österreich and Österreichbild, Klingendes Österreich as well as theAlpen-Donau-Adria-Magazin. The studio also delivers information to the ORF Center in Vienna for the Zeit im Bild, Willkommen Österreich and various sporting events.

The regional studio Styria also houses the Radio Steiermark and the editorial office for the web portal steiermark.orf.at. This web portal offers an internet stream of Radio Steiermark and the news Steiermark heute and Zeit im Bild. These are available up to 3 weeks after the initial broadcast.

The "Audience studio", which is suitable for public television and radio productions, also acts as a venue of congress, and so makes the regional studio to an open house. The "Funkhausgalarie" offers various art exhibitions in regular intervals. The ORF Steiermark also hosts readings and concerts.

=== Tyrol (T) ===
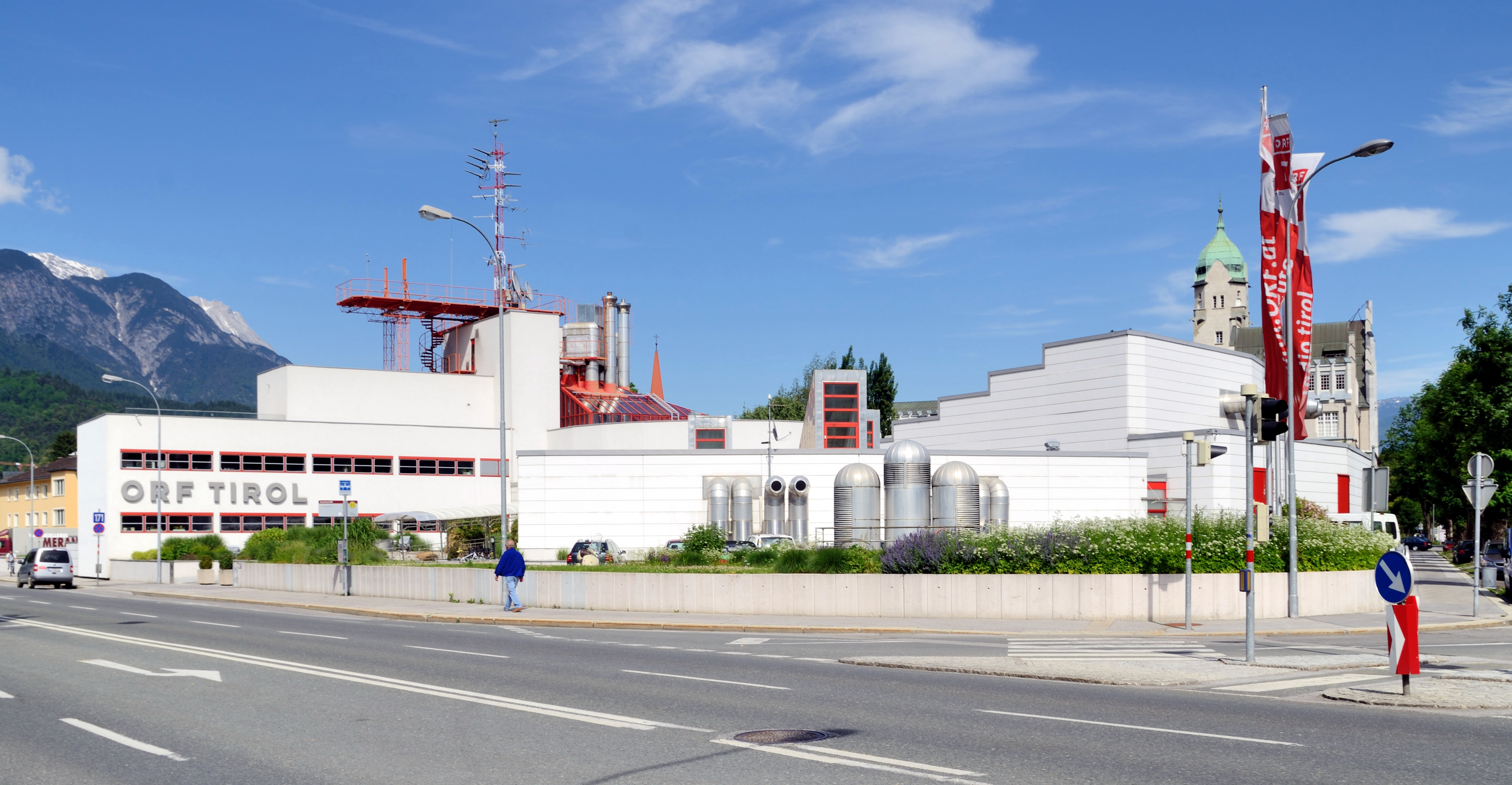
Regional studio in Tyrol (2012)

The regional studio for Tyrol is located on the Rennweg 14 in Innsbruck. The regional director is Helmut Krieghofer.

The broadcasting studio and office in Bolzano is located on the Werner-von-Siemens-Straße 19 in Bolzano, sharing the same building with the RAS headquarters. This is the only headquarters outside Austria.

The ORF Tirol produces the television news Tirol Heute daily and Südtirol Heute on weekdays. Since 2021, the former is broadcast from Innsbruck and the latter from Bolzano. Until March, 2021, the reports for Südtirol Heute were produced in the ORF office in Bolzano and the news was broadcast through Innsbruck. The regional studio in Tyrol also broadcasts the live folk music show Mei liabste Weis with Franz Posch, which gets broadcasts three times a year from different venues in Austria.

Kulturhaus Tirol

The regional office in Tyrol also operates the "Kulturhaus", in which art and cultural exhibitions are shown regularly. In this building, famous and un-known artists have a platform to present their work.

=== Vorarlberg (V) ===
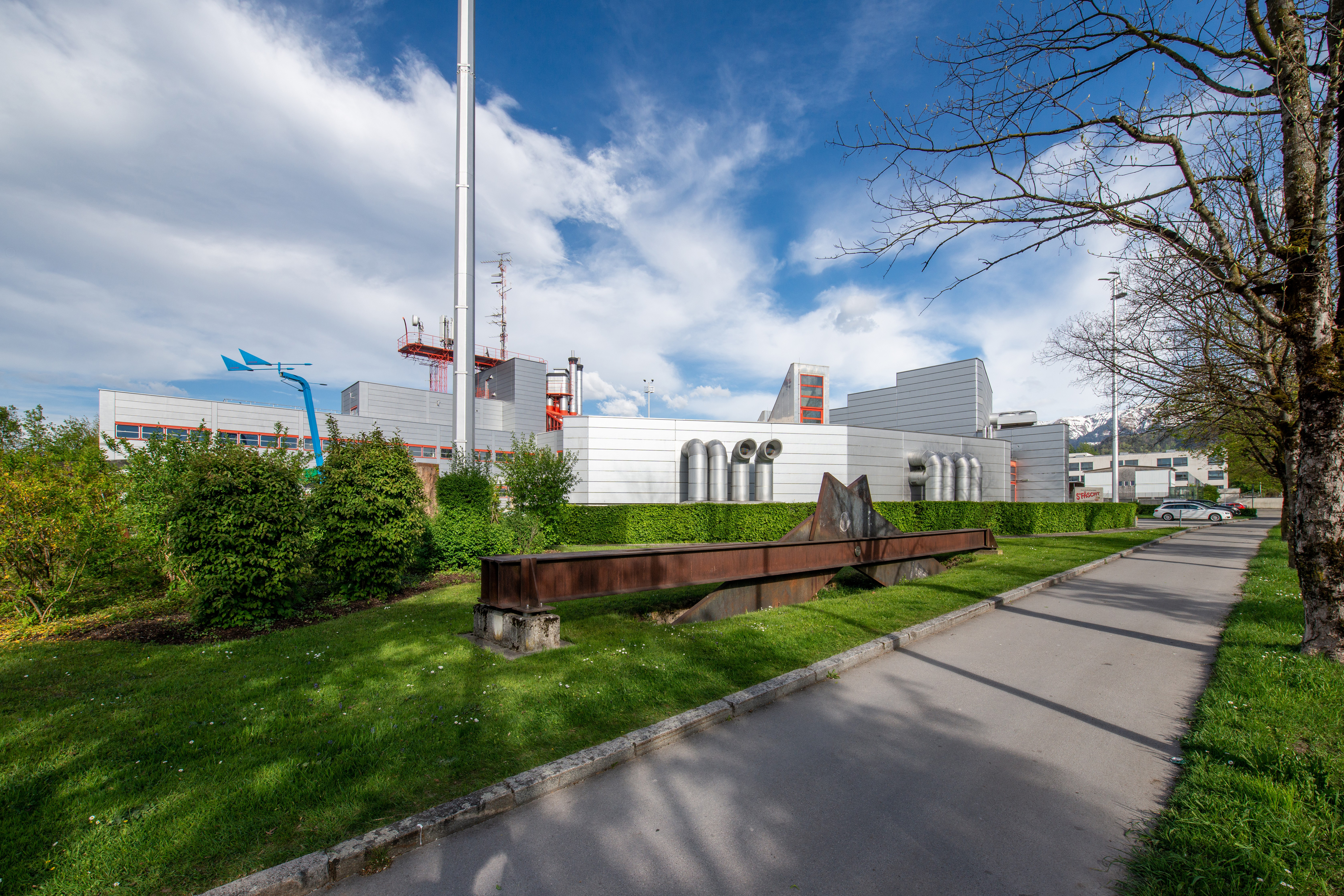
Regional studio in Vorarlberg

The regional studio for Vorarlberg is located on the Rundfunkplatz 1 in Dornbirn. The regional director is Markus Klement.

Moderators which used to work at ORF Vorarlberg are: Elmar Oberhauser, Roman Rafreider, Hanno Settele, Lisbeth Bischoff and Peter Moosmann. These moderators now work in nationwide ORF TV channels or are foreign correspondents.

=== Vienna (W) ===
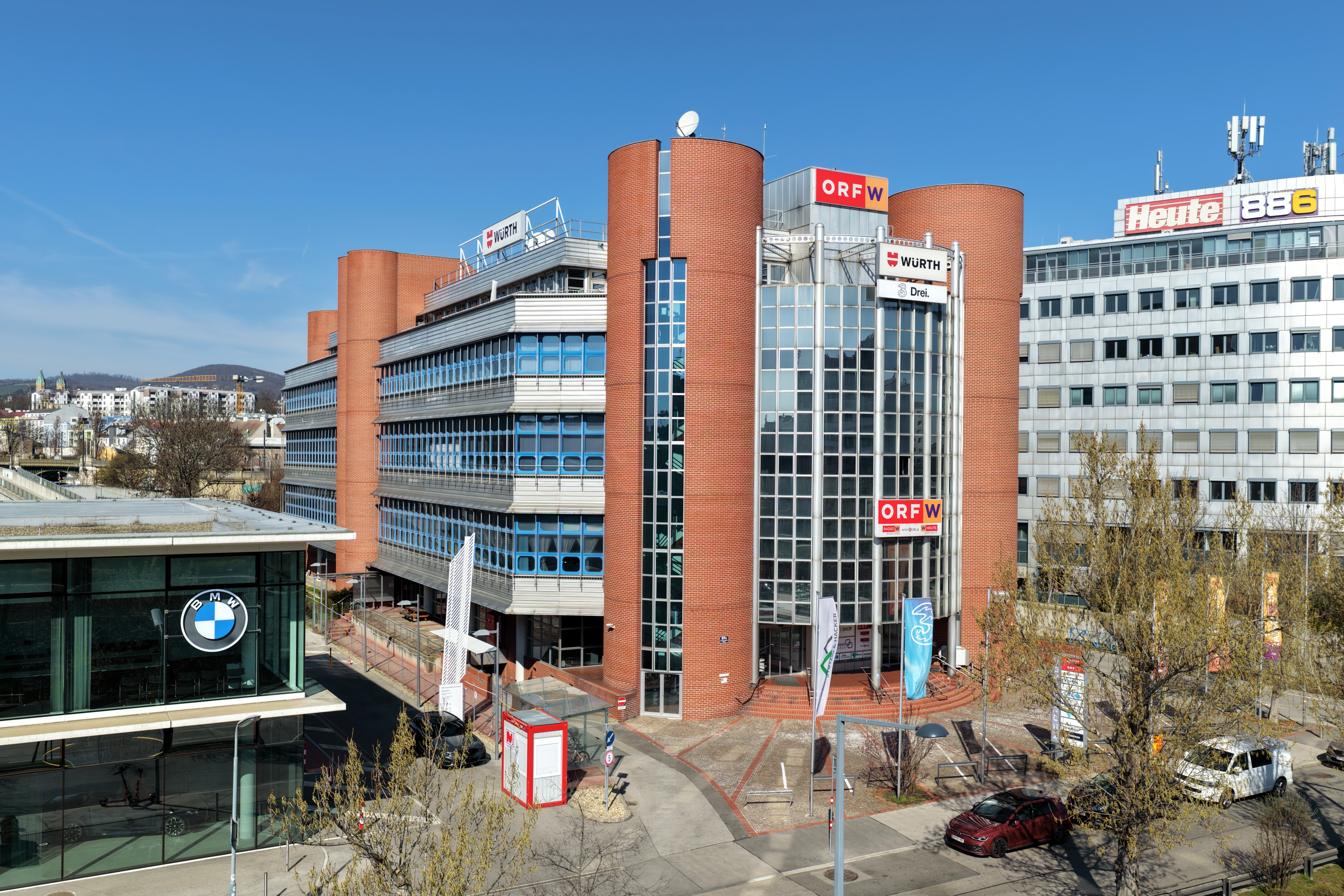
ORF regional studio in Vienna

The regional studio for Vienna was located on the Argentinierstaße 30a in Vienna. The regional director is Edgar Weinzettl.

== See also ==
- Ö2
