= ATV (Austria) =

Television station in Austria

- Country: Austria
- Broadcast area: National

Ownership
- Owner: Tele München Gruppe (1997-2017); ProSiebenSat.1 Media (2017-present)
- Sister channels: ATV2; Puls 4 Puls 24; Sat.1 Österreich; ProSieben Austria kabel eins Austria sixx Austria; Sat.1 Gold Österreich; ProSieben Maxx Austria kabel eins Doku Austria

History
- Launched: 1997 (as Wien 1); 17 January 2000 (as ATV, national pay-TV launch); 1 June 2003 (national terrestrial TV launch); 15 July 2013 (HD channel)
- Closed: 31 December 2023 (SD Channel)
- Former names: Wien 1 (W1; 1997–2000); ATVplus (2003–2006)

Links
- Website: www.atv.at

Availability

Terrestrial
- Austria: available free-to-air on digital terrestrial television

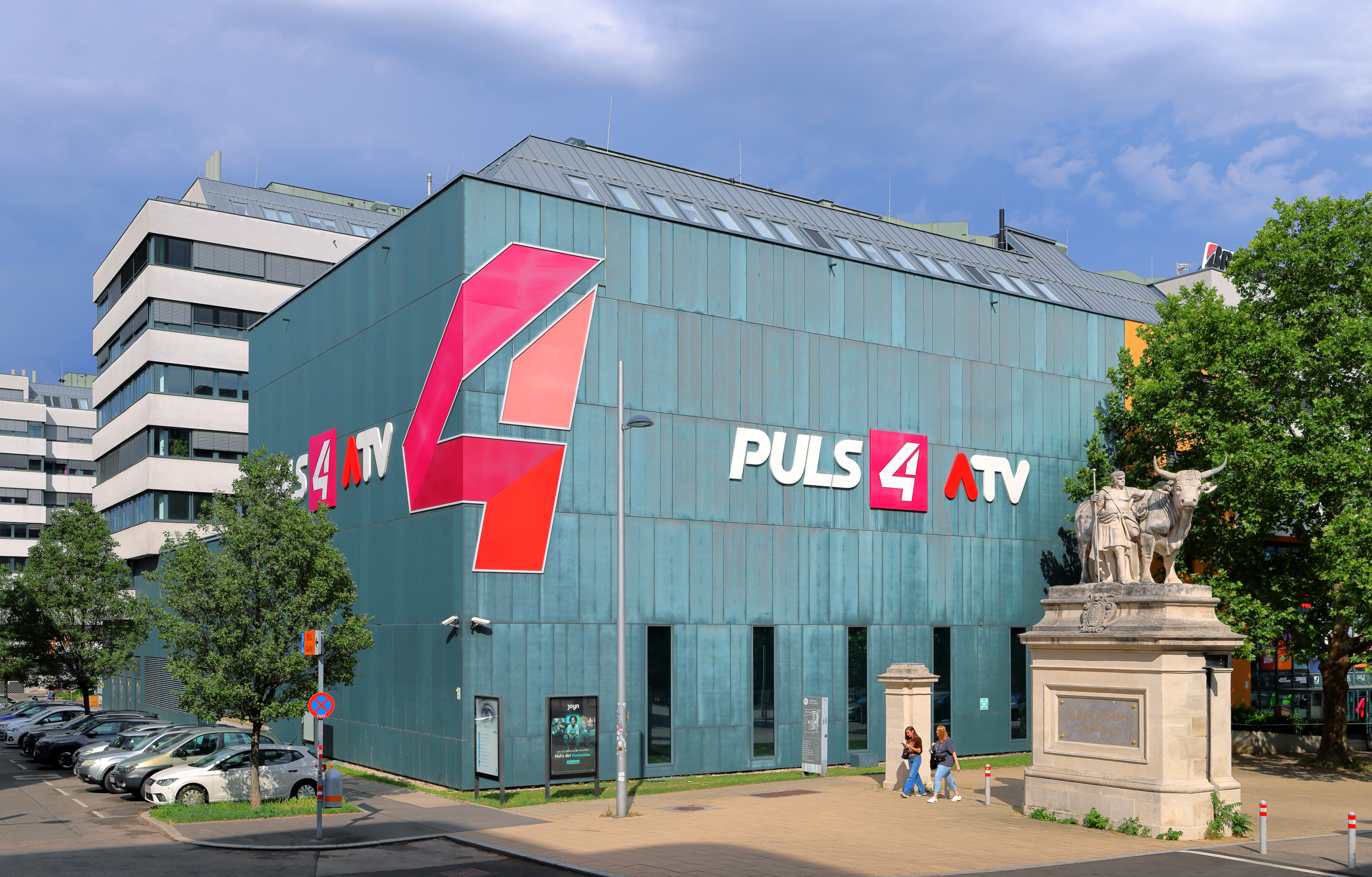
ATV's headquarters in Vienna

ATV is the largest commercial television station in Austria, and was the first commercial station to be aired via transmitters after a long time when commercial broadcasts in Austria were only possible via satellite or cable and the national public broadcaster ORF held a monopoly of using the airwaves.

According to the current broadcasting legislation in Austria, ATV has to be transmitted nationwide alongside the two public channels ORF1 and ORF2 via digital terrestrial television and satellite as well as all cable companies in Austria have to provide at least these three channels to their subscribers. Satellite broadcasts are encrypted as are the ORF channels but it is possible to watch ATV by using the decoding cards issued by ORF. These cards can be obtained only by people living in Austria and paying the television license fees.

Another important Austrian commercial television stations available on digital terrestrial television, satellite and cable is Puls 4, although these have to arrange their broadcasting independently since they are not covered by the aforementioned Austrian television legislation regulating the two ORF channels and ATV.

== History ==
From 1997 till 2000 the station was called W1 (Wien 1, named after the capital city Vienna) which initially provided only regional broadcasting via the cable network in Vienna. Starting 17 January 2000, the channel adopted nationwide programming and entered all the other cable networks in Austria and was renamed ATV.

With ATV being a cable channel, there were no clear policies to establish a private terrestrial channel. There were only two channels broadcasting free-to-air, ORF 1 and ORF 2. It wasn't until 1 August 2001 when the Private Television Law was passed. Such a situation led to some policymakers at the time by saying that Austria was "probably the last country in the civilized world" to introduce private television, as ATV was only receivable on cable networks in Vienna, Linz and Salzburg. Journalists and media businessmen even came up with nicknames ("Medien-Albanien" and "Medien-Kasachstan" comparing the situation to lesser-developed countries such as Albania and Kazakhstan, in the sense that those countries had limited freedoms, but had private television before Austria did). ATV was one of the three bids for the national network, two other contenders were Canada's CHUM (owner of CityTV) and Italy's Stream TV.

On 1 June 2003, the channel started nationwide broadcasts using analogue terrestrial transmitters, and on digital satellite on 18 September. The digital television transition started in Austria in 2006 and since then, ATV has been available on digital terrestrial television. In the 2003-2006 period, the channel was called ATVplus.

The analogue channels used by ATV were already allocated in 1972 when the introduction of a third nationwide TV-channel (either by ORF or by a commercial company) was discussed in Austria. These discussions actually lasted from the 1970s until 2003.

On December 1, 2011, a second channel called ATV2 (styled as ATV II) was launched. This channel is available throughout Austria via cable and satellite whereas terrestrial broadcasts are limited to selected regions. ATV2 focuses on movies, culture, news and other additional programming previously not covered by ATV.

Two years after ATV2 was launched, ATV HD launched on July 15, 2013, ATV HD programs on HD television.

At the end of August 2016, ATV CEO Herbert Kloiber announced to sell ATV. He described ATV as his biggest mistake. He had made a loss with the channel in double-digit millions. The German ProSiebenSat.1 Group was already early on the scene as a serious buyer, including the Austrian broadcaster Puls 4. On February 6, 2017, the takeover by ProSiebenSat.1 was finally concluded by contract. This must now be approved by the Federal Competition Authority. Approval is considered probable if certain conditions are met - one of which is the editorial independence of ATV. Critics see in the takeover a further concentration on the already weakly segmented Austrian television market. Thus, the advertising market is already dominated by the ProSiebenSat.1 group.

The sale was executed on March 9, 2017 at the price of 25 million euros. The conditions were the maintenance of Austrian-related news and other Austrian formats such as Bauer sucht Frau, Pfusch am Bau etc. The conclusion of the takeover was announced on April 6, 2017.

The new owner also wants to continue ATV2. A new concept was developed by the end of 2017 and moved to Marx Media Quarter at that time. At the beginning of 2018 a soft re-launch of the channel took place; from 2 May of that year, ATV was in charge of all of PSS1's Austrian channels.

== Logos ==
1997-2000	2000-2003	2003-2006	2006–present	2013–present (HD channel)

== Programming ==
=== Own production ===
About 40% of ATV's programming are in-house productions, whereas the other 60% consist of acquired shows, movies and serials.

Name	Description
ATV Aktuell	Newscast
ATV Wetter	Weather
Hi Society	magazine about celebrities
Bauer sucht Frau	Farmer wants a wife
Die Lugners	magazine dedicated to the life of Richard Lugner a famous owner of an Austrian building-company, living a celebrity lifestyle
Österreich isst besser!	television show about healthy nutrition, hosted by Sasha Walleczek
Sing and Win!	guessing of song lyrics, conducted by Rainhard Fendrich
ATV Die Reportage	report program
Dokupedia	documentary show

=== Imported ===
- 2 Broke Girls (2013-2016)
- 24 (2006-2008)
- 7th Heaven (Eine himmlische Familie) (2007-2014)
- According to Jim (Immer wieder Jim - Jim hat immer Recht!) (2011-2014)
- Alias (Alias - Die Agentin) (2006-2008)
- Almost Human (2015-2017)
- Andromeda (2004-2007)
- Anger Management (2013-2017)
- The Bold and the Beautiful (Reich und Schön) (2007)
- Bones (Bones - Die Knochenjägerin) (2008-2016)
- Californication (2011)
- Castle
- The Closer (2011-2016)
- Criminal Minds (2006–present)
- Dexter (2011-2012)
- Dharma & Greg (2006-2007)
- Everybody Loves Raymond (Alle lieben Raymond) (2006-2007)
- The Flash
- Fringe (Fringe - Grenzfälle des FBI) (2018–present)
- Gotham
- Grey's Anatomy (2012-2015)
- Home Improvement (Hör mal, wer da hämmert!) (2006-2011, 2014-2017)
- Judging Amy (Für alle Fälle Amy) (2006-2007, 2009-2011)
- The King of Queens (King of Queens) (2006-2017)
- Leverage (2010-2016)
- Lie to Me (2010-2015)
- Lucifer
- Married... with Children (Eine schrecklich nette Familie) (2013-2016)
- Monk
- The Nanny (Die Nanny) (2006-2012)
- NCIS
- Nip/Tuck (Nip/Tuck - Schönheit hat ihren Preis) (2006-2011)
- Rizzoli & Isles (2012–present)
- Smallville
- Two and a Half Men (2011-2017)
- Veronica Mars (2006-2009)
