= Richard Grasl =

Austrian journalist and media manager

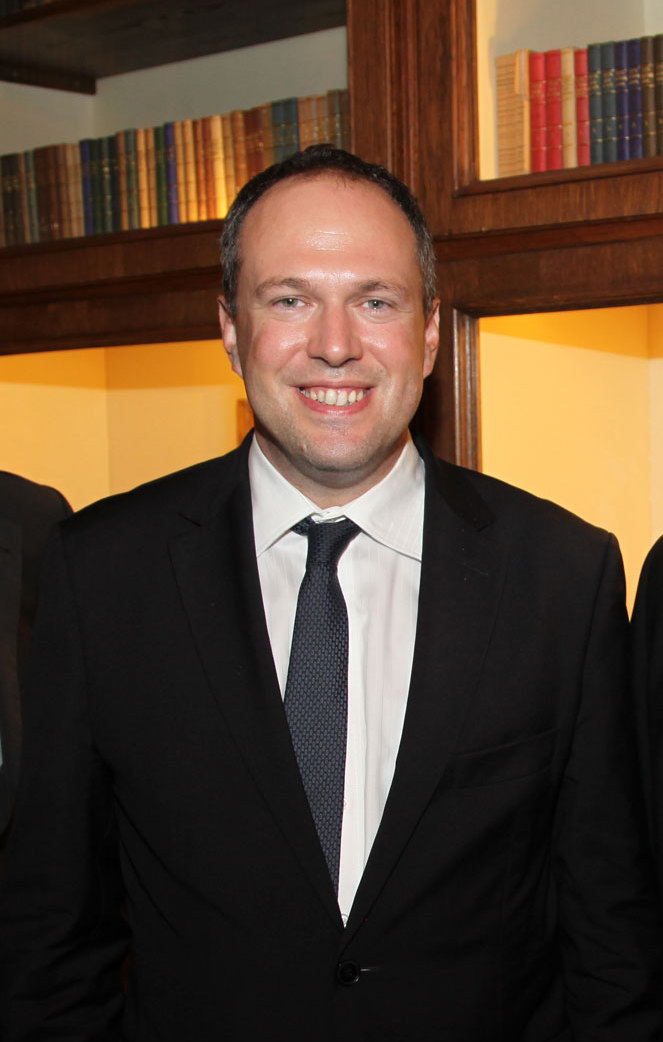
Grasl in 2010

Richard Grasl (born January 21, 1973, in Sankt Pölten) is an Austrian journalist and media manager. Among other things, he was Editor-in-Chief of the Austrian Broadcasting Corporation ORF Studios Lower Austria (2002–2009) and commercial director of the Austrian Broadcasting Corporation (2009–2016). He has been a member of the Kurier Editor-in-Chief since November 2018 and deputy Editor-in-Chief since January 2021.

== Biography ==
Grasl grew up in Krems an der Donau, where his parents ran an inn, and studied economics in Vienna. At the same time he worked as an editor and later as a television presenter at ORF Lower Austria. In 2001, he switched to the editorial office of Zeit im Bild 3, later also to Zeit im Bild 2. From 2002 he was Editor-in-Chief of ORF Lower Austria and responsible for all news programs of the state studio.

Richard Grasl, who is considered to be close to the ÖVP, became commercial director of the ORF from mid-December 2009. When he was elected, he received 33 out of 35 votes with 2 abstentions, with representatives of all parties voting for Grasl. Christiane Teschl succeeded him as Editor-in-Chief of ORF Lower Austria.

On June 23, 2016, Grasl announced that he wanted to run against the incumbent Alexander Wrabetz in the election of the ORF Director General scheduled for August 9, 2016, by the ORF Foundation Council. He received 15 out of 35 votes from the members of the board of trustees.

At the end of October 2016 he left ORF. Andreas Nadler succeeded him as commercial director on January 1, 2017. Grasl then worked as a freelancer and took on, among other things, strategic advice to Mediaprint in the areas of TV and moving images. Richard Grasl has been a member of the Kurier editor-in-chief since November 2018 and is responsible for managing the digital editorial team.

On May 31, 2017, he was elected to the supervisory board of Flughafen Wien AG as a representative of the state of Lower Austria.

On January 1, 2021, he was appointed Deputy Editor-in-Chief of Kurier. As of January 1, 2023, he is to replace Thomas Kralinger as managing director of the news magazine profil.

== Private life ==
Grasl is married and has two children from this marriage.

In 2017, he was involved in a boating accident on Lake Wörthersee and subsequently convicted of criminal charges when the builder Manfred Schroll died.
