= Guro Kleven Hagen =

Norwegian violinist raised in Fagernes (born 1994)

- Born: 11 May 1994 (age 31); Oslo, Norway
- Occupation: Musician
- Instruments: Violin

Guro Kleven Hagen (born 11 May 1994) is a Norwegian violinist raised in Fagernes. She is the first concertmaster at the Norwegian National Opera and Ballet orchestra as of January 2018.

== Biography ==
In 2012 Kleven Hagen attended studies with Professor Antje Weithaas at the Hochschule für Musik "Hanns Eisler" in Berlin following many years of studies at Barratt Due Institute of Music.

In 2010 Kleven Hagen won the title Virtuoso performing Tchaikovsky's Violin Concerto, and was the winner of "Den norske solistpris" and became the Norwegian participant in Eurovision Young Musicians 2010 where she came second. That same year she became the first Norwegian finalist in the Menuhin Competition where she was awarded the EMCY prize. In 2011 she debuted with Oslo Philharmonic, and has been a soloist in Germany, Russia, Austria, Denmark, Sweden, Poland, Israel, and Norway.

Kleven Hagen performs on a violin made by C. Bergonzi (Cremona, Italy) made about 1735–40, also known as Kreisler-Bergonzi on loan from Dextra Musica.

== Honors ==
- 2010: Winner of Virtuoso
- 2010: Awarded Den norske solistpris
- 2010: No 2 in Eurovision Young Musicians
- 2010: Finalist in the Menuhin competition, as well as winner off the EMCY prize
- 2011: Awarded Karoline Prize
- 2013: Awarded Statoil's talent scholarship in classical music
- 2014: Awarded Arve Tellefsen's Musician Prize
- 2017: Nominated for the 2017 Spellemannprisen in the category classical music for Fait pleurer les songes together with Marianna Shirinyan
