= Marianna Shirinyan =

Marianna Shirinyan Մարիաննա Շիրինյան
- Born: 25 September 1978 (age 48); Yerevan, Armenia
- Genre: Classical
- Occupation: Pianist
- Instrument: Piano
- Years active: 1994–present
- Website: marianna-shirinyan.com

Marianna Shirinyan (Մարիաննա Շիրինյան; born 25 September 1978) is an Armenian-Danish musician and prizewinner of various musical contests. Shirinyan is also a Steinway Artist.

== Biography ==
Marianna Shirinyan was born in Yerevan, Armenia on 25 September 1978. Shirinyan has appeared as a soloist and chamber musician on several performances. She is a frequent guest at a string of international festivals, among them the Schleswig-Holstein Music Festival, the Schwetzinger Festspiele, MDR Summer Music Festival, Festspillene in Bergen, as well as Stavanger, Risør, Oxford International Chamber Music Festivals a.o. Simultaneously she has had several solo appearances with such leading orchestras as the Danish National Symphony Orchestra, Oslo, Helsinki and Copenhagen Philharmonic Orchestras, Tapiola Sinfonietta, Göteborg and Norrköping Symphony Orchestras in Sweden as well as Odense, Århus and South Jutland Symphony Orchestras in Denmark. During the season 2013-14 Marianna was Artist in residence at the Odense Symphony Orchestra.

Outside Scandinavia, she has performed with the Bavarian Radio Symphony Orchestra, the Potsdamer Kammerakademie, the Deutsche Radio Philharmonie Saarbrücken Kaiserslautern, the Munich Symphony Orchestra, Würzburg Philharmonic, Munich and Hamburg Chamber Orchestras the Armenian Philharmonic Orchestra, I Pomeriggi Musicali di Milano, Wuhan Philharmonic under the baton of such conductors as Hans Graf, Lawrence Foster, Zoltan Kocsis, Antonello Manacorda, Jun Märkl, Daniel Raiskin, Lan Shui, Marc Soustrot, Thomas Søndergård, Krysztof Urbanski and Joshua Weilerstein.

== Performances ==
Shirinyan has also performed in several cities of Denmark, Finland, Netherlands, Germany, Italy, Armenia, Russia and other places. Specifically outside Scandinavia, she has performed with the Bavarian Radio Symphony Orchestra, the Potsdamer Kammerakademie, the Deutsche Radio Philharmonie Saarbrücken Kaiserslautern, the Munich Symphony Orchestra, Würzburg Philharmonic, Hof Symphony Orchestra, Munich Chamber Orchestra, the Armenian Philharmonic Orchestra, and I Pomeriggi Musicali di Milano. In addition, she has worked with known conductors such as Zoltán Kocsis, Simon Gaudenz, Antonello Manacorda, Thomas Søndergård, Krysztof Urbanski, and Joshua Weilerstein.

In February 2013, Shirinyan made her Rachmaninov performance with the Danish Radio Symphony Orchestra.

=== Teaching career ===
In the period between 1998 and 2006, she held a part-time position as a teacher/coach of piano accompaniment at the Musikhochschule Lübeck in Germany, she entered the position with tender age of 19. Between 1999 and 2003 Marianna returned regularly to the Orchestra Academy of the Schleswig Holstein Music festival as a coach for piano/chamber music. In addition from 2003 to 2011 she has been a regular member of the Esbjerg Ensemble in Denmark. Marianna has been teaching at the chamber music summer academy of the competition 'Jugend Musiziert' in Schloss Weikersheim, Germany as a youngest ever docent of the academy.

Since 2015 Marianna is professor at the Norwegian Academy of Music in Oslo.

=== Repertoire ===
Solo Performances

J.S. Bach

- Preludium and Fuga in C sharp Major BWV 848
- Preludium and Fuga in c sharp minor BWV 849
- Preludium and Fuga in e flat minor BWV 853
- Preludium and Fuga in C Major BWV 870
- Partita in B flat major BWV 825
- Partita in c - minor BWV 826
- English Suite No. 2 in a minor, BWV 807
- Italian Concerto in F Major, BWV 971

L.v. Beethoven

- Piano Sonata No. 7 in D Major, Op. 10 No. 3
- Piano Sonata No. 17 in d - minor Op. 31 No. 2 "Sturm Sonata"
- Piano Sonata No. 30 in E major, Op. 109
- Piano Sonata No. 31 in A flat major, Op. 110
- Piano Sonata No. 32 in C minor, Op. 111
- Piano Sonata No. 21 in C major, Op. 53, "Waldstein"

A. Berg Piano Sonata, Op. 1

F. Schubert

- Piano Sonata No. 19 in C minor, D. 958
- Piano Sonata No. 20 in A major, D. 959
- 4 Impromptus, Op. 90, D. 899

R. Schumann

- Abegg Variations Op. 100
- Kreisleriana, Op. 16
- Symphonische Etüden Op. 13
- Kinderszenen, Op. 15
- Arabeske in C major, Op. 18

J. Brahms

- Two Rhapsodies Op. 79
- 6 Piano Pieces, Op. 118
- Piano Pieces, Op. 119

F. Chopin

- Piano Sonata No. 3 in B minor, Op. 58
- Scherzo No. 1 in B minor, Op. 20
- Ballade No. 2 in F major, Op. 38
- Scherzo No. 3 in C sharp minor, Op. 39
- Ballade No. 3 in A flat major, Op. 47
- Ballade No. 4 in F minor, Op. 52
- Barcarolle in F Sharp Major, Op. 60
- Berceuse in D flat major, Op. 57
- Polonaise No. 7 in A flat major, Op. 61, "Polonaise-fantasie"
- Impromptu No. 4 in C sharp minor, Op. 66, "Fantaisie-impromptu"

F. Liszt

- Rhapsodie espagnole, S254/R90
- Dante Sonata, S 161

F. Mendelssohn Variations Serieuses, Op.54

M. Ravel

- Gaspard de la nuit
- Sonatine
- Valses nobles et sentimentales

C. Debussy

- Images (Book 1)
- Estampes
- Preludes

S. Rachmaninov

- Variations on a Theme by Corelli, Op. 42

C. Franck Prelude, Choral et Fugue

S. Prokofiev

- Piano Sonata No. 2 in D minor, Op. 14
- Piano Sonata No. 3 in A minor, Op. 28
- Piano Sonata No. 4 in C minor, Op. 29
- Piano Sonata No. 7 in B flat major, Op. 83

A. Schönberg

- 3 Klavierstucke, Op. 11
- Klavierstucke, Op. 33a/b

D. Shostakovich 24 Preludes Op. 34

Concertos with orchestra

W.A. Mozart

- Piano Concerto No. 12 in A - Major KV 414
- Piano Concerto No. 20 in D minor, KV. 466
- Piano Concerto No. 21 in C Major, KV. 467 "Elvira Madigan"
- Piano Concerto No. 23 in A major, KV. 488

L.v. Beethoven

- Piano Concerto No. 3 in C minor, Op. 37
- Piano Concerto No. 4 in G major, Op. 58

F. Chopin

- Piano Concerto No. 1 in E minor, Op. 11
- Piano Concerto No. 2 in F minor, Op. 21

J. Brahms
Piano Concerto No. 1 in D minor, Op. 15
R. Schumann
Piano Concerto in A minor, Op. 54
E. Grieg
Piano Concerto in A minor, Op. 16
S. Prokofiev
Piano Concerto No. 3 in C major, Op. 26
S. Rachmaninov
Piano Concerto no. 2 in C-minor, op. 18
Rhapsody on a Theme of Paganini, Op. 43

== Achievements ==
The following is the list of Shirinyan's accomplishments:

- During her early years, she placed 1st in the Youth Chamber Music Competition in Paderborn, Germany (Junge Ensembles Musizieren) in 1994. She was also a prizewinner in the International Competition for Young Pianists in Ettlingen, Germany, Gaillard, France, and twice in Spain - Maria Canals and C.I.P.C.E.
- In 2001, Marianna Shirinyan received the prize in both the Schleswig-Holstein Musik Festival and the Possehl Music Award in Lübeck.
- In 2002, she won 1st Prize in the International Lion's Competition. Soon after, she had received more accomplishments.
- She had won 1st place once again while playing together with Finnish violinist Laura Vikman in the Premio Vittorio Gui chamber music competition in Florence, Italy in 2004.
- She received five awards in the ARD International Music Competition held in Munich, namely the Second Prize, the Audience Prize, the Special Prize of Münchner Kammerorchester, the Brüder-Busch Prize, and the Prize of Symphonieorchester des Bayerischen Rundfunks.
- In 2009, The Association of Danish Music Critics awarded Shirinyan their Annual Prize.
- In 2010, she received the Danish Radio's P2 Artist Prize for her contributions to the musical and artistic life in Denmark.
- During 2014 Marianna Shirinyan was jury member at two significant International Piano competitions, the ARD Music Competition in Munich and the Edvard Grieg International piano competition in Bergen/Norway.
- In 2016 she returned to the Grieg competition as a jury member.
- During the years 2016/17 Marianna was Artistic director of the Fejø Chamber music festival.
- In 2018 Marianna Shirinyan took over the artistic direction of the Oremandsgaard Kammermusikfest in Denmark.
- Since 1 August 2024 she is Piano Professor at the Royal Danish Academy of Music.

== Discography ==
Shirinyan's discography includes Il Viaggio (Solo Musica), Beethoven/ Kuhlau piano concertos with Copenhagen Phil (Orchid Classics), Mozart Piano Concertos Nos. 12 & 23 with Odense Symphony Orchestra (Bridge), Chopin chamber music with Andreas Brantelid, cello, and Vilde Frang, violin (EMI), Niels W. Gade: Piano Works (DaCapo), and Fait Pleurer Les Sanges with Guro Kleven Hagen, violin (Simax).
