= List of German-language television channels =

The List of German-language television channels includes the following channels:

== Italy ==
South Tyrol

- Rai Südtirol
- Südtirol Digital Fernsehen
- Südtirol Heute

== Other countries ==
Country	Name	Owner	Notes
(Switzerland)	BASEL	the BASEL corporation	television\news channel
(Austria) (Germany) (Switzerland)	3sat	ORF, ARD, ZDF, SF	public channel association
(France) (Germany)	Arte	ARTE France & ARTE Deutschland	Franco-German coproduction
(Belgium)	BRF TV	Belgischer Rundfunk	local channel for the German-speaking minority in East Belgium
(Germany)	DW-TV	Federal Republic of Germany	
(Germany)	ProSiebenSat.1 Welt	ProSiebenSat.1 Media	in the U.S. and Canada, programming from the German television channels ProSieben, Sat.1, Kabel 1 and N24
(Germany)	RTL International	RTL Group	External broadcasting service of RTL Television (2016-2017)
(United States)	Dolphin TV		German Television Channel based in Florida (discontinued in May 2007)
(United States)	German Kino Plus	FennFamLLC	features German films and series, on Dish Network
(United States)	Germany Music TV		American version of the German Music Television channel for North & South America

== Programmes in other countries ==
Country	Name	Channel	Notes
(Poland)	"Schlesien Journal" ("Silesia Journal")	TVP Katowice, TVP Opole, TVS Silesia	News programme for the German minority in Silesia
(Slovakia)	"Das Deutsche Magazin" ("The German magazine")	Dvojka	Programme for the German minority in Slovakia
(Hungary)	"Unser Bildschirm" ("Our screen")	M1	Cultural programme for the German minority in Hungary
(Romania)	"Magazin în limba germană" ("Magazine in German language")	TVR1, TVR International	Programme for the German minority in Romania
(Monaco) (France) (Italy)	"Top Themen" ("Top topics")	Monaco Info	Programme in German for Monaco, South of France and the Italian Riviera
(Namibia)	"News in German"	NBC	Programme for the German community in Namibia
(Australia)	"German News"	SBS One, SBS Two	News programme in German produced by DW TV
(Canada)	AHORN TV	Omni Television	German Television Program on OMNI TV broadcast weekly programming all episodes also available online after 1st airing on OMNI TV www.ahorntv.com
(United States)	"Pennsylvania German"	Berks Community Television	Programme for the Pennsylvania Dutch community in Pennsylvania

== See also ==
- Lists of television channels
- Television in the German Democratic Republic
