= Cathrine Zaborowski =

Norwegian footballer (born 1971)

Personal information
- Full name: Cathrine Elisabeth Zaborowski-Melbye
- Birth name: Cathrine Elisabeth Zaborowski
- Date of birth: 3 August 1971 (age 55)

International career
Years	Team	Apps	(Gls)
1988–1994	Norway	68	(7)
Medal record
Representing Norway
Women's football
World Cup
Silver medal – second place	China 1991	Team

Cathrine Elisabeth Zaborowski-Melbye (née Zaborowski; born 3 August 1971) is a former Norwegian football player who played for the Norway national team.

She played on the Norwegian team that won silver medals at the 1991 FIFA World Cup in China.

She won the Karoline Prize in 1989, being the second winner of the prize after Karoline Krüger in 1988.

== Career ==
She played most of her career for Asker. She played 68 international matches for Norway and scored 7 goals. With Asker, she won the National Championship in 1990 and 1991 and became series champion with the club in 1988, 1989, 1991, and 1992. She became unofficial world champion in 1988. She became European Champion in 1993, and was also in two European Championship finals in 1989 and 1991. She was a World Cup finalist in 1991, where Norway was defeated 2-1 by the USA.

== Personal life ==
She married television presenter Sarah Natasha Melbye.
