= Karoline Prize =

Norwegian award

The Karoline Prize is a Norwegian prize awarded annually to students in upper secondary school who combine good school results with top achievements in sports, art, and culture. The prize was originally created by Wang Handelsskole og Gymnas, and was set at NOK 15,000. As of 2020, the prize is NOK 20,000 and is awarded by Wang sports school. The prize was first awarded in 1988 to Karoline Krüger, and has since been named the Karoline Prize.

== Award winners ==
The prize is awarded annually.

- 1988 Karoline Krüger
- 1989 Cathrine Zaborowski
- 1990 Annbjørg Lien and Elise Båtnes
- 1991 Siw Vestengen
- 1992 Monica Røtvold
- 1993 Martinus Grov
- 1994 Cecilie Leganger
- 1995 Jan Werner Danielsen
- 1996 Jannicke Abrahamsen
- 1997 Stefan Kofod Hansen
- 1998 Marie Theisen
- 1999 Lene Marlin and John Carew
- 2000 Jon Lech Johansen
- 2001 Lisa Mari Kvalvik
- 2002 Christine Guldbrandsen
- 2003 Catherine Chen
- 2004 David Pedersen
- 2005 Wanlapa Konkai
- 2007 Helene Olafsen and Sara Chen
- 2008 Katharina Stiberg
- 2009 Marie Haagenrud
- 2010 Isabelle Sandstedt Pedersen
- 2011 Guro Kleven Hagen and Sverre Lunde Pedersen
- 2012 Johannes Thingnes Bø
- 2013 Eivind Holtsmark Ringstad
- 2014 Henrik Christiansen
- 2015 Martin Ødegaard and Nora Foss al-Jabri
- 2016 Grace Bullen
- 2017 Jakob Ingebrigtsen
- 2018 Vegard Dragsund Nilsen
- 2019 Birk Ruud
- 2020 Helene Marie Fossesholm
