= Südtirol Heute =

ST heute logo

Südtirol Heute (German for South Tyrol Today) is a television programme of the Austrian ORF, which is broadcast in Austria and relayed by the Rundfunk Anstalt Südtirol (RAS) in South Tyrol, Italy. The programme covers news from all three parts of the Tyrol, namely North Tyrol, East Tyrol and South Tyrol.

Südtirol Heute is broadcast every work day on ORF 2 Tirol at 18:30 CET, and, since 2007, by the RAS on ORF 1 at 19:30 CET. The television show is produced by the ORF Studio in Bolzano, Italy (until March, 2021 by the ORF-Landesstudio-Tirol in Innsbruck, Austria) and moderated by Sigrid Silgoner and others.

== See also ==
- ORF regional studios
