= TW1 (Austria) =

Defunct Austrian television channel

- Country: Austria

Programming
- Picture format: 576i (SDTV)

Ownership
- Owner: ORF

History
- Launched: December 1997; 28 years ago
- Closed: October 26, 2011; 14 years ago
- Replaced by: ORF III

TW1 (Tourismus und Wetter 1 (Tourism and Weather 1)) was an Austrian digital television channel, broadcasting programmes about news, culture, leisure, travel and weather. It was owned by the Austrian national broadcaster, Österreichischer Rundfunk (ORF). TW1 was replaced by the ORF III on 26 October 2011.

== Programming ==
TW1 broadcast a variety of programmes, which usually followed current events not just in Austria but also the rest of continental Europe. These included interviews with politicians and debate shows, live weather information, which was provided through web cams located all over Austria, travel shows, up to date travel information also via web cams (ASFINAG) and shows of cultural interest.

== History ==
TW1 On-Screen-Design 2008

TW1 was launched in 1997 on the Astra satellite at 19.2° east on the unencrypted ORF Digital package, and on cable networks in German-speaking countries. Initially, the channel was also available for some time on terrestrial analogue television in Salzburg on the Gaisberg Transmitter, and some times, it was simulcasted by ORF 2.

Since October 2005, TW1 was 100% owned by ORF.

In May 2000, ORF started a regular sports programme on TW1. Both live broadcasts as well as magazine programmes were broadcast several times a week on TW1. With the launch of ORF Sport Plus in May 2006, most sports programmes were moved to the new channel, and were now no longer being broadcast on TW1.
