= Zeit im Bild =

Austrian news broadcast

- Logo since 2015
- Directed by: Matthias Schrom (editor-in-chief)
- Country of origin: Austria
- Original language: German

Production
- Production locations: Vienna, Austria

Original release
- Network: ORF
- Release: December 5, 1955

Zeit im Bild (ZiB; translated in English as A Time in the Picture) is the name for the television news broadcasts of ORF, running since December 1955.

== History ==
The first Zeit im Bild was broadcast on December 5, 1955; two editions were broadcast that day, at 5pm and 7:30pm. The format of the bulletins was based on those at the time of the BBC, in which an in-vision presenter read out the day's news. The title Zeit im Bild (roughly, The Time in the Picture) was thought up by the TV journalist and later ORF Director General Teddy Podgorski.

From February 3, 1975, the news broadcast on ORF's first TV channel (FS 1) was renamed to Zeit im Bild 1 at 7.30 pm and was supplemented by Zeit im Bild 2 on the second channel (FS 2). The two bulletins had different start times and different lengths, depending on which programmes were aired directly before said newscasts. ZiB 1 was designed from the outset as a "news show". News was mixed with entertainment, not all elements of the reporting had to be included, and instead of many brief reports, a longer and more detailed background reporting was sought. There was an overview of the news, and the "theme of the day" was then reported in more detail. ZIB 2 was presented by journalists, rather than announcers, who took a more 'hands-on' role in the newscast. Blue screen technology was also introduced in the studio.

From October 22, 1979, the Zeit im Bild 1 was broadcast on both ORF channels, a practice which would remain in place until 2007. ZiB 2 was now broadcast under the broadcasting title Zehn vor zehn (Ten to Ten), running from 9:50pm to 10:20pm. In addition to the latest news, more explanatory and informative background reports were offered. Compared to the ZiB 1, there was more room for filmed reports, live interviews in the studio and outside broadcasts. There was greater use of the teleprompter among presenters, as opposed to them reading from a script.

In 1984 a new newsroom was set up, where all of the editorial staff and other journalists were based, in order to allow more effective internal communication. In line with other broadcasters, bulletins were now presented only by journalists, as opposed to announcers. From March 26, 1984, Zehn vor zehn was renamed back to Zeit im Bild 2, and its airtime brought forward to 9:15pm; the newscast was shortened to twenty minutes, in order to accommodate the newly created Kulturjournal (Cultural report). A new focus of ZiB 2 became to report news that was not mentioned in the main Zeit im Bild. On September 28, 1987, the start time of ZiB 2 was changed to 10:00pm, where it remains as of 2017. In 1990 a new concept for Zeit im Bild 2 was originated: it was decided that the programme should be a mix of news, background information and lighter elements, with live reports being especially important.

On January 1, 1991, ZiB 1 and ZiB 2 were renamed to Zeit im Bild, Ausgabe 19:30 (The Times in Pictures, 7:30pm Edition) and Zeit im Bild, Ausgabe 22:00 (The Times in Pictures, 10:00pm edition), in order to show that both broadcasts were of an equal importance. From 1997 to 2007, a third ZiB newscast, entitled ZiB 3, was shown daily at midnight on ORF 2; this was aimed at a younger audience.

During the terror attacks of September 11, 2001, Zeit im Bild broadcast 43 hours of uninterrupted reporting about the attack and its aftermath. On May 2, 2002, a new newsroom was put into operation, allowing journalists to file reports around the clock more easily and quickly.

Zeit im Bild's logo from 2002 to 2015

Since July 5, 2004, ZiB bulletins have been available to watch throughout Europe via Astra satellite on ORF 2 Europe. Certain broadcasts, such as the morning bulletins and ZiB 2 at 10:00pm, are also shown on 3sat.

=== Structure until April 2007 ===
- Zeit im Bild 1 was broadcast at 7:30pm on ORF 1 and ORF 2 simultaneously, and was the most-watched newscast in Austria. It reported on the latest news from Austria and abroad, along with cultural reports.
- ZiB 2 is broadcast on weekdays at 10:00pm on ORF 2: it is a more in-depth newscast than ZiB 1, and features many in-depth reports and interviews. At weekends a late edition of ZiB was broadcast instead of ZiB 2.
- ZiB 3 was shown at midnight, also on ORF 2: its style was intended to be similar to that of newscasts from the private German broadcasters.
- Short 'ZiB' bulletins are broadcast at 9am, 1pm and 5pm on ORF 2.
- Short bulletins under the name Newsflash were broadcast on ORF 1 during weekday afternoons and evenings.
- Special editions, known as ZiB Spezial, were broadcast during major news events.

=== 2007 restructure onwards ===
In April 2007, a major overhaul of ORF's television news operation took place. The most important change, which took place after discussions in the editorial office, was ending the practice of the 7:30pm Zeit im Bild being broadcast on both ORF channels. Since then, it has been broadcast only on ORF 2, which resulted in a loss of market share in the evening. Other changes were:

- Newsflash on ORF 1 was renamed to ZiB Flash and was extended to weekends.
- A new bulletin, entitled ZiB 20 was introduced on ORF 1 daily at 8pm; giving a summary of the most important events in about seven minutes. This was designed to compete with the successful bulletins offered by ProSieben Austria, which attracted a largely young audience.
- ZiB 24, a newscast airing at midnight, was also introduced on ORF 1, serving as a replacement for ZiB 3.

=== 2019/20 restructures ===
- On April 8, 2019, a new studio was put into operation for the ZiB broadcasts in ORF1. At the same time, a new 6–8 minutes long newscast ZiB 18:00 was introduced at 6:00pm in a similar style to the ZiB 20, replacing the previous edition of ZiB Flash aired at roughly the same time, depending on the programmes surrounding it. The ZiB 24 was taken off the programme and replaced with a shorter newscast ZiB Nacht airing for 6–8 minutes roughly around 10:30pm.
- Upon the spread of Coronavirus in March 2020 and the measures imposed by the Austrian government to reduce infections, the ORF has extended the length of the ZiB1 to 35 minutes and started broadcasting it on both channels ORF2 and ORF1, replacing the ZiB 20 on ORF1. After some weeks, the broadcast was shortened to 25min, but the simultaneous broadcast on both channels and the omission of the ZiB 20 were kept in place.
- For the period between the closure of schools during the COVID-19 pandemic and the start of the summer holidays, ORF1 aired a new broadcast ZiB ZACK aimed at school children. It aired 3 times on weekday mornings between 9:00am and 12:00pm and lasted for 3 minutes each. The ORF had not produced news programmes for children anymore since the station reform in 2007.

== Current presenters ==
=== ZIB 9:00 & ZIB 13:00 ===
- Rebekka Salzer
- Stefan Lenglinger
- Rosa Lyon
- Simone Stribl
- Peter Teubenbacher
- Katja Winkler
- Alexandra Maritza Wachter

=== ZIB 17:00 & ZIB 1 ===
- Nadja Bernhard
- Tobias Pötzelsberger
- Tarek Leitner
- Susanne Höggerl

=== ZIB 2 ===
- Armin Wolf
- Margit Laufer
- Martin Thür
