= Tele Uno =

Defunct Austrian television station

Tele Uno was an Austrian private television station, which operated from the tripoint between Austria, Italy and Yugoslavia (now Slovenia) from 1985 to 1989. Programming was regional, with strong emphasis on Carinthia, and also included certain programming in Italian.

== History ==
ORF held a long-standing monopoly on Austrian television for decades, which was formally broken only in the early 2000s. Tele Uno circumvented Austrian regulations by broadcasting from a transmitter at Monte Forno in the Karawanks, on the Italian side of the border. Most of the coverage area was on the Austrian side and included films, some of which had their Austrian hights held by the station. Its editor-in-chief was Walter Perkounig. The station broadcast on VHF channel 3. Tele Uno was sustained by a company that provided commercial advertising for private radio and television stations in Austria.

On 10 August 1988, it was reported that Tele Uno's coverage area increased to cover all of Tyrol, Austria's westernmost state. The station planned to irradiate a test card in the coming days in Innsbruck. Tele Uno ended up bankrupt in 1989 at the cost of half a billion schillings (€40 million in 2003), but briefly resumed test services on UHF channel 61 before shutting down completely.

== Programming ==
Tele Uno began with an amateur local schedule, which included a local news service (ORF only started Kärnten Heute in 1988), which initially covered minor events. Over time, it improved its quality thanks to Italian support.
