= ORF Sport + =

Austrian sports channel

- Logo used since 2024
- Country: Austria
- Broadcast area: Austria and South Tyrol, reaching bordering regions via overspill of their terrestrial networks

Programming
- Picture format: 576i (16:9 SDTV); 720p (16:9 HDTV)

Ownership
- Owner: ORF
- Sister channels: ORF 1 ORF 2 ORF III

History
- Launched: 1 May 2006; 20 years ago
- Former names: ORF Sport Plus (2006–2011)

Links
- Website: tv.orf.at/orfsportplus

Availability

Terrestrial
- DVB-T (South Tyrol, Italy): LCN 91 (Rundfunk Anstalt Südtirol MUX UHF 42, free-to-air)
- DVB-T2 (Austria): Channel 11 (DVB-T2 MUX B, simpliTV free); Channel 36 (DVB-T2 MUX B, simpliTV more)

Streaming media
- ORF ON: Watch live(Austria only)

ORF Sport + is an Austrian sports channel owned by the public service broadcaster, ORF. The channel is available via satellite Astra 1KR, on 19.2°E, cable and DVB-T, in Austria and parts of Europe.

== History ==
Before the launch of ORF Sport Plus on 1 May 2006, TW1 provided sports programming since May 2000 up until the launch of ORF Sport Plus.

On 22 October 2007, ORF Sport Plus was made available to DVB-T, only in the state capitals of Austria. Since that date, TW1 was available only on cable and satellite.

On July 15, 2009, ORF Information Director Elmar Oberhauser announced that the channel would be discontinued in 2010 for cost reasons. However, the ORF law secured the program and it is to be expanded.

On October 26, 2011, ORF SPORT + was expanded into a 24-hour special interest channel. The channel took over the antenna frequency previously shared with Hitradio Ö3 TV and received new satellite and cable slots.

A high definition (HD) version of the channel was announced for October 24, 2014.

== Programming ==
ORF Sport + shows a variety of fringe sport programming including; Formula E, American football, ice hockey, football, hockey, badminton, tennis, table tennis, volleyball, team handball, swimming, and the National Golf Championships.

== Logos ==
1 May 2006 – 26 October 2011

26 October 2011 – 16 June 2024

25 October 2014 – 16 June 2024

16 June 2024 – present
