= ORF III =

- Logo used since 2011
- Country: Austria
- Broadcast area: Austria and South Tyrol, reaching bordering regions via overspill of their terrestrial networks

Programming
- Picture format: 576i (16:9 SDTV); 720p (16:9 HDTV)

Ownership
- Owner: ORF
- Sister channels: ORF 1 ORF 2 ORF Sport +

History
- Launched: 26 October 2011; 15 years ago
- Replaced: TW1

Links
- Website: tv.orf.at/orf3

Availability

Terrestrial
- DVB-T (South Tyrol, Italy): LCN 90 (Rundfunk Anstalt Südtirol MUX UHF 21, free-to-air)
- DVB-T2 (Austria): Channel 8 (DVB-T2 MUX B, simpliTV free); Channel 19 (DVB-T2 MUX B, simpliTV more)

Streaming media
- ORF ON: Watch live(Limited programming outside Austria)

ORF III (ORF drei, Österreichischer Rundfunk 3), sometimes called ORF 3 is an Austrian television channel owned by the Austrian national broadcaster, Österreichischer Rundfunk (ORF). The channel launched on 26 October 2011 at 14:00 CEST, and replaced TW1.

ORF III took over the frequencies on satellite and cable from TW1, which specialised in tourism and weather. ORF III also launched on digital terrestrial television in Austria, and since 2017 is available in encrypted form on the Austrian DVB-T2 platform simpliTV. Limited programming from ORF III is available to view via Internet streaming, while podcasts from ORF III are available online. ORF Sport +, the station that shared the frequency with TW1, moved to a new 24-hour slot.

== Logos ==
HD logo
