= Rundfunk Anstalt Südtirol =

Public broadcasting company of South Tyrol

Rundfunkanstalt Südtirol
- Type: Television and radio network
- Country: Italy
- Availability: South Tyrol
- Headquarters: Bolzano
- Owner: Government of South Tyrol
- Key people: Peter Silbernagel (president); Georg Plattner (director)
- Launch date: 5 January 1975
- Official website: https://www.ras.bz.it/en/

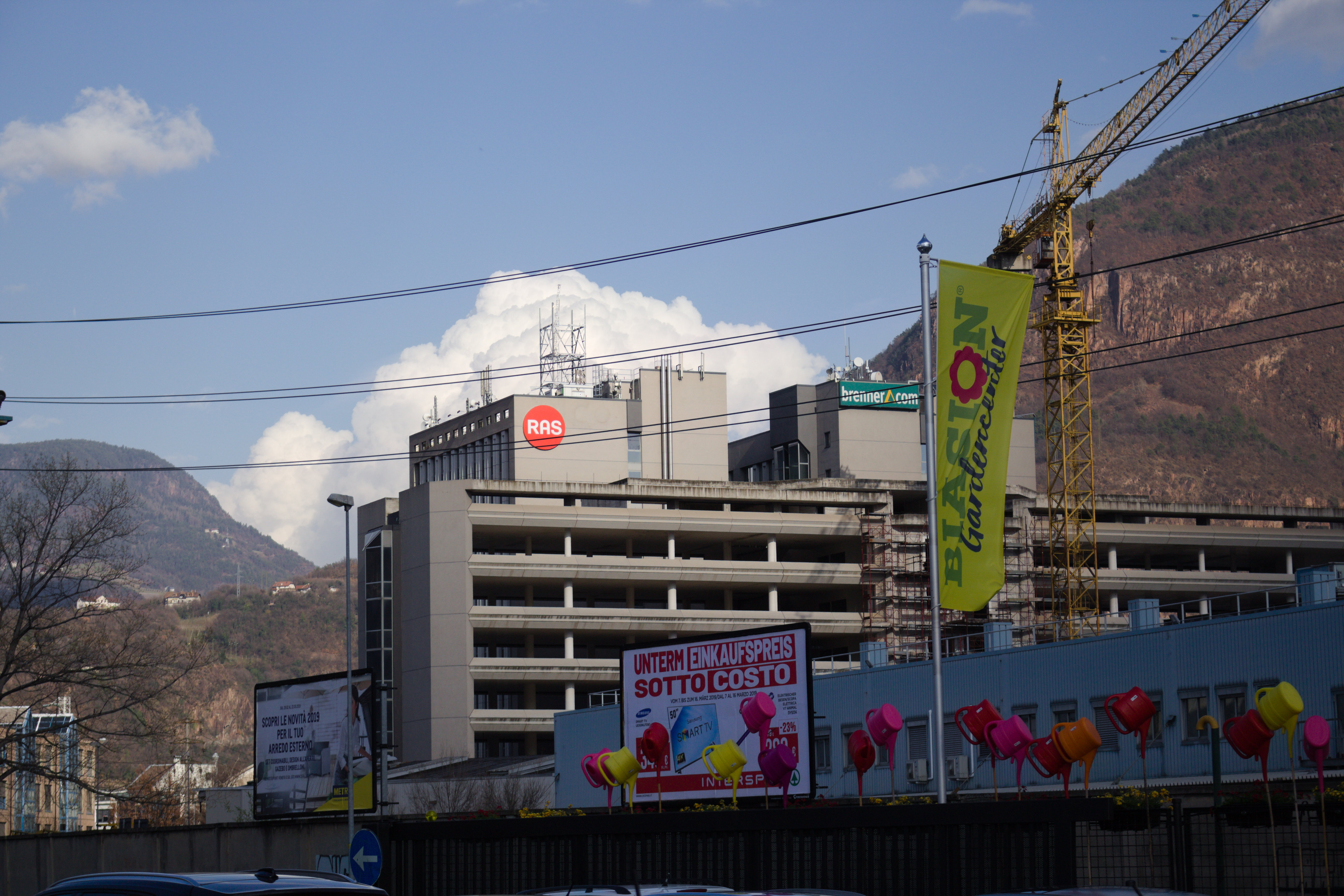
Headquarters in Bolzano

The Rundfunkanstalt Südtirol (Italian: Radiotelevisione Azienda Speciale, Ladin: Radiotelevijion- Azienda per Südtirol) is a public broadcasting service, completely funded by grants of the provincial government, for the majority German-speaking province of South Tyrol, Italy whose purpose is to relay programmes from the public broadcasters of Austria, Germany, German and Romansh Switzerland. The agency has its headquarters in the province's capital city Bolzano. RAS is not related to the regional trilingual programme of RAI, the Italian public broadcaster.

== History ==
When television broadcasts began in South Tyrol in 1957, the German-speaking population of South Tyrol asked for the reception of German-language television stations from abroad but it wasn't possible because RAI has the monopoly to have radio and television stations. In 1966 the Italian Government in Rome created the German-speaking broadcast of RAI from Bolzano called Rai Südtirol (back then Rai Sender Bozen) but the German-speaking population just wanted to have the possibility to watch the television station from Austria and perceived the offer from Rome suspiciously. The German-speaking broadcast of the government-owned RAI was seen as a way to control the process of autonomy in the province. After the Second Statute of Autonomy came into force in 1972, the provincial government for South Tyrol promised to create an agency whose purpose was to relay programmes from Austria and other German-speaking countries. The autonomous statute says that: The Province shall have the power to issue laws on local artistic, cultural and educational events and activities, and also through the media of radio and television, but without the power to set up radio and television stations. The RAS was founded as an organisation on 5 January 1975 and nowadays owns all transmitter towers in South Tyrol and has worked for the digitisation of its broadcasting system. RAS cooperates with the local civil protection corps to give information to the people of South Tyrol in case of emergency.

== Organization ==
RAS is a public company which is formed by a board elected for 2/3 by the Government of the Autonomous Province of South Tyrol. According to the agency the RAS employs 26 workers. While the Italian public broadcaster RAI is funded by licence fees and advertising, RAS is completely funded by provincial funds. All the public broadcasters give the possibility to RAS to relay their programmes without any cost (provincial citizens don't have to pay extra license fees). South Tyrol is actually the only province in Italy to have two public broadcasting services operating - the provincial German-language broadcast from RAI and the 6 RAS TV channels. The general director is Georg Plattner.

== Programmes ==
=== Television ===
RAS relays television stations from the public broadcasters of Austria, Germany and Switzerland in digital terrestrial television using DVB-T. Analogue television was used between 1974 until the completion of the digitization process. Until the completion of the digitization process, the digital-only channels cannot be seen in either analog or vice versa. The network has completed its digitization process which started in 2007 and completed in November 2009. In some areas the terrestrial reception of some channels is not possible. The on-screen-design of RAS is a small writing down on the right of the screen.

Television channels carried by RAS:

Since 1975: ORF 1, ZDF
Since 1988: Das Erste, SF 1 (now SRF 1), ORF 2
Since 2005: SF 2 (now SRF zwei)
Since 2009: BR Fernsehen, KiKA, ZDFneo
Since 2010: 3sat, ARTE, RSI La 1, ZDF HD, ORF 1 HD, ORF 2 HD.
Since 2012: ORF III
Since 2021: ORF Sport +

=== Radio ===
RAS relays radio stations also from the public broadcasters of Austria, Germany and Switzerland in FM and DAB+.

Radio stations carried by RAS:

Since 1976: Ö2 Radio Tirol, Hitradio Ö3
Since 1980: Ö1
Since 1989: Radio RTR
Since 1997: Bayern 3, BR-Klassik, BR24, Rai Radio 1, Rai Radio 2, Rai Radio 3, Rai Ladinia, Rai Südtirol
Since 2003: Bayern 1
Since 2004: Bayern 2, FM4, Radio Swiss Jazz
Since 2008: Deutschlandfunk Kultur
Since 2013: Radio Swiss Classic, Radio Swiss Pop, RSI Rete Due
Since 2015: BR Heimat
Since 2017: Deutschlandfunk Nova
Since 2019: Die Sendung mit der Maus

The first five radio stations are available on FM, while all stations are additionally also available on DAB+.
