= ORF 2 =

- Logo used since 2012
- Country: Austria
- Broadcast area: Austria and South Tyrol, reaching bordering regions via overspill of their terrestrial networks
- Headquarters: Vienna

Programming
- Language: German
- Picture format: 576i (SDTV); 720p (HDTV)

Ownership
- Owner: ORF
- Sister channels: ORF 1; ORF III; ORF Sport +

History
- Launched: 11 September 1961; 65 years ago
- Former names: Versuchsprogramm (1961–1967); FS 2 (1967–1992)

Links
- Website: tv.orf.at/program/orf2

Availability

Terrestrial
- DVB-T (Austria): Channel 2 (DVB-T MUX A, free-to-air)
- DVB-T (South Tyrol, Italy): LCN 89 (Rundfunk Anstalt Südtirol MUX UHF 21, free-to-air)
- DVB-T2 (Austria): Channel 2 (DVB-T2 MUX D, simpliTV)

Streaming media
- ORF On: Watch live (Limited programming outside Austria)

ORF 2 (ORF zwei, Österreichischer Rundfunk 2) is an Austrian public television channel owned by ORF. It was launched on 11 September 1961 as a technical test programme. Today it is one of the four public TV channels in Austria.

ORF 2 is available via DVB-T in Germany near the Austrian border and in parts of Munich. It is funded by a mixture of advertising breaks and a television licence fee; as such, unlike its German equivalents (which are generally available free-to-air), ORF 2 and its sister stations are encrypted over satellite.

== History ==
ORF 2 began broadcasting three days a week as a "Technical Test Program" (Technisches Versuchsprogramm) on UHF frequencies on 11 September 1961. In 1967, the Versuchsprogramm was renamed as FS 2 (Fernsehprogramm 2; 'Television programme 2'), and its broadcasting days were increased to five days a week, which remained the case until 1 September 1970 when it began broadcasting daily. On 2 May 1988, regional news programmes known as Bundesland heute (The States Today) were introduced for each Austrian state. On 26 October 1992, FS 2 was renamed as ORF 2.

On 9 January 2012, a complete design change took place, similar to that of ORF eins a year prior. In line with the clear design of ORF eins, a vertical navigation bar was introduced as a central on-air element to join programme credits, idents, promotions and commercial breaks. The red and white design is designed to underline the strong Austrian identity of the station.

== Programming ==
In contrast to ORF 1, which focuses on TV series, movies and sports, ORF 2 broadcasts more Austrian-oriented and cultural programs. The most important news broadcast Zeit im Bild is broadcast several times a day, with the flagship bulletin being broadcast at 7:30pm each night. Bundesland heute (news for the federal states) is broadcast directly before this at 7:00pm; nine regional window programs are broadcast – one for each state. In the broadcasting area of Tyrol and in South Tyrol, which is part of Italy, Südtirol heute is broadcast from Monday to Friday at 6:30 pm, which is produced by the ORF studio in Bolzano (until March, 2021 by the ORF Landesstudio Tirol in Innsbruck).

=== Entertainment ===
- Eurovision Choir (2017)
- Eurovision Young Musicians

=== Information ===
- Zeit im Bild

=== Series ===
- Gomorrah (Gomorrha – Die Serie) (2015–2016)
- Murder, She Wrote
- Outlander
- Prime Suspect (Heißer Verdacht) (2009, 2011)
- Seinfeld
- Tatort (2006–present)

== Reception ==
All nine regional feeds of ORF 2 can be received via satellite: these are all encrypted and can only be watched by viewers who have an ORF viewing card, which is available to anyone who pays the ORF licence fee. An international version of ORF 2, known as ORF 2 Europe, has been broadcast unencrypted over satellite in Europe since July 2004; certain programmes for which ORF does not have the rights to broadcast outside Austria are replaced with a video feed of ORF 2's teletext service, accompanied by the audio of Ö1. Many of ORF 2's programmes, such as some Zeit im Bild bulletins, are also broadcast or repeated on 3sat.

Since October 2006, ORF 2 has been broadcast terrestrially via DVB-T in Austria. Via multiplex A, the regional feed of the viewer's own state can be received, as well as that of a neighboring federal state.

== Branding ==
The "ORF eye"

Historical text logo, used from the 1960s to the early 2000s

From 1968 until 1992, ORF 2 prominently featured the red "ORF eye" logo in its television idents alongside several stylised number "2" logos. In 1992, the first version of the "yellow cube" ORF 2 logo was introduced, designed by Neville Brody. In 2000, ORF 2's logo was updated into a spinning, cube with the number 2 inside, seen moving to the centre and shortly after, back. As the sequence happens, it is often accompanied by a futuristic, background with lots of orange lighting over a black background, the ORF Eye is also visible under the light. This particular logo has been nicknamed "Würfel", German for "Cube". In 2005, there was another update to ORF's on-screen design: to avoid the logo being burnt in to plasma screens, it was changed from red-yellow to red-white.

In 2010, it was announced that ORF 2 would be rebranded as "ORF zwei" in 2011, but it's unused.

=== Logos ===
Logo from 1968 to 1975

Logo from 1975 to 1979

Logo from 1979 to 26 October 1992

Logo from 27 October 1992 to 4 October 2000

Logo from 5 October 2000 to 16 August 2005

Logo from 17 August 2005 to 9 January 2012

ORF 2 HD logo from 5 December 2009 to 9 January 2012

Logo of project "ORF zwei" in January 2011

Logo since 9 January 2012

ORF 2 HD logo since 9 January 2012
