= ORF 1 =

- Logo used since 2019
- Country: Austria
- Broadcast area: Austria and South Tyrol, reaching bordering regions via overspill of their terrestrial networks
- Headquarters: Vienna

Programming
- Language: German
- Picture format: 576i (SDTV); 720p (HDTV)

Ownership
- Owner: ORF
- Sister channels: ORF 2; ORF III; ORF Sport +

History
- Launched: 1 August 1955; 71 years ago
- Former names: ORF Fernsehen (1955–1967); FS 1 (1967–1992); ORF eins (2011–2019)

Links
- Website: tv.orf.at/program/orf1

Availability

Terrestrial
- DVB-T (Austria): Channel 1 (DVB-T MUX A, free-to-air)
- DVB-T (South Tyrol, Italy): LCN 88 (Rundfunk Anstalt Südtirol MUX UHF 21, free-to-air)
- DVB-T2 (Austria): Channel 1 (DVB-T2 MUX D, simpliTV)

Streaming media
- ORF ON: Watch live (Limited programming outside Austria)

ORF 1 (ORF eins, Österreichischer Rundfunk 1) is an Austrian public television channel owned by ORF. It was the first television channel in Austria, started in 1955, with regular programming started in 1957 when it now operated six days a week, then began broadcasting every day in 1961.

ORF 1 is one of four public TV channels in Austria. It is funded by a mixture of advertising revenue and television licence fees: as such, unlike the German TV stations (which are generally available free-to-air), ORF 1 and its sister channels are encrypted over satellite.

== Programming ==
ORF 1 mainly shows films, TV series and sporting events; this is in contrast to ORF 2, which focuses more on news, documentaries and cultural programming. As the target audience of ORF 1 is younger than that of ORF 2, ORF's children's output, okidoki, is broadcast on ORF 1 every morning. Popular sporting events, such as skiing, Formula One and association football are also usually shown on ORF 1. ORF has exclusive rights to many sports; for example, it held the exclusive rights to Formula One until 2020. Currently the race weekends are split equally between the channel and Servus TV. In addition to the regular commentary, some sporting events, as well as some dramas, carry special commentary tracks for the visually impaired, via the MPEG-4 (formerly Zweikanalton) system.

Until 9 April 2007, ORF's flagship news programme Zeit im Bild (The Times in Pictures) was broadcast at 7:30pm on both ORF 1 and ORF 2; as part of a major programme overhaul, this was replaced on ORF 1 with the soap opera Mitten im 8en. Due to poor ratings, the soap was short-lived and was replaced on 2 July 2007 by Malcolm in the Middle. To fill the void left by removing Zeit im Bild from ORF 1, two new news programmes entitled ZiB 20 and ZiB 24 were introduced; as their names suggest, they are broadcast at 8pm (20:00) and midnight (24:00) every night. In addition, short bulletins known as ZiB Flash are shown several times throughout the day.

Feature films form a key part of the primetime output on ORF 1, and are shown several nights a week: many movie premieres are shown at the same time as on German broadcasters, but without the commercial interruptions that are commonplace on private German channels. Certain films and series are broadcast with both the German dub and the original (usually English) soundtrack via Zweikanalton (Two-channel sound).

ORF 1 also broadcast free-to-air the Disney+ edit of Taylor Swift: The Eras Tour on 10 August 2024 at 9:45pm CEST, due to the cancellation of the Austrian leg of Taylor Swift's The Eras Tour's after the revelation of a terrorist plot.

Since its launch ORF 1 have aired reruns of various classic shows such as Maya the Bee.

== High definition broadcast ==
On 28 January 2008, ORF started its high-definition services. The first broadcast was a ski race called The Nightrace in Schladming. A special HDTV event, introducing HD technology, was scheduled in all regional ORF stations right after. The technological partner for HD productions is Telekom Austria. Test operations began on 1 May 2008: ten days later, these were made available to any households with an ORF card showing a trailer. Those who could receive ORF 1 HD would see a trailer which showed excerpts from sports footage, films and documentaries.

ORF 1 HD officially launched on 2 June 2008, five days before the start of 2008 UEFA European Football Championship.

=== Reception ===
ORF 1 HD is broadcast on Astra 19.2° east on 10,832 GHz horizontal (SR 22000, FEC 5/6). The channel is also available through Cable and IPTV.

=== Programming ===
Initially, the vast majority of programmes were upscaled, save for some sporting events, movie premieres and American television series. However, this has gradually increased; more and more of ORF's productions have been in HD, and many older copies of movies and TV series were re-sourced and replaced with HD scans; for example, older episodes of The Simpsons have been remastered in HD and, as of 2017, are broadcast in this format on ORF 1.

== Parental guidance ==
ORF abridges some movies due to child-protection rules, but less often than German stations. ORF identifies its programs with initials: X (not suited for children; parental guidance advised), O (adults only), or with no initial. The sign K+ (recommended for children) is shown only on teletext.

== Branding ==
The "ORF eye"

Historical text logo, used from the 1960s to the early 2000s

From 1968 until 1992, ORF 1 prominently featured the red "ORF eye" logo in its television idents alongside several stylised number "1" logos. In 1992, the first version of the "green cube" ORF 1 logo was introduced, designed by Neville Brody. In 2000, ORF 1's logo was updated into a moving, soft-edged, gelatinous cube with the number 1 inside. This particular logo has been nicknamed "Jelli." In 2005, there was another update to ORF's on-screen design: to avoid the logo being burnt in to plasma screens, it was changed from green to grey all-over.

In 2010, it was announced that ORF 1 would be rebranded as "ORF eins" from 8 January 2011.

On 26 April 2019, ORF eins was renamed back to ORF 1 with a brand new logo and on-screen design by design agency Bleed.

=== Logos ===
Logo from 27 October 1992 – 4 October 2000

Logo from 5 October 2000 – 17 August 2005

Logo from 17 August 2005 – 8 January 2011

ORF 1 HD logo from 2 June 2008 – 8 January 2011

Logo from 8 January 2011 – 26 April 2019

ORF eins HD logo from 8 January 2011 – 26 April 2019

Logo since 26 April 2019

ORF 1 HD logo since 26 April 2019
